= Amarillo Thunderheads =

Logo	Cap insignia

Information
- League: American Association (2011–2015) (South Division)
- Location: Amarillo, Texas
- Ballpark: Potter County Memorial Stadium
- Founded: 2010
- Folded: 2015
- League championships: 0
- Division championships: 0
- Former name: Amarillo Sox (2011–2014)
- Former league: Central Baseball League
- Colors: Navy, red, white, gold
- Ownership: Southern Independent Baseball
- General manager: Stephanie Tucker
- Manager: Bobby Brown
- Website: www.amarillosox.com

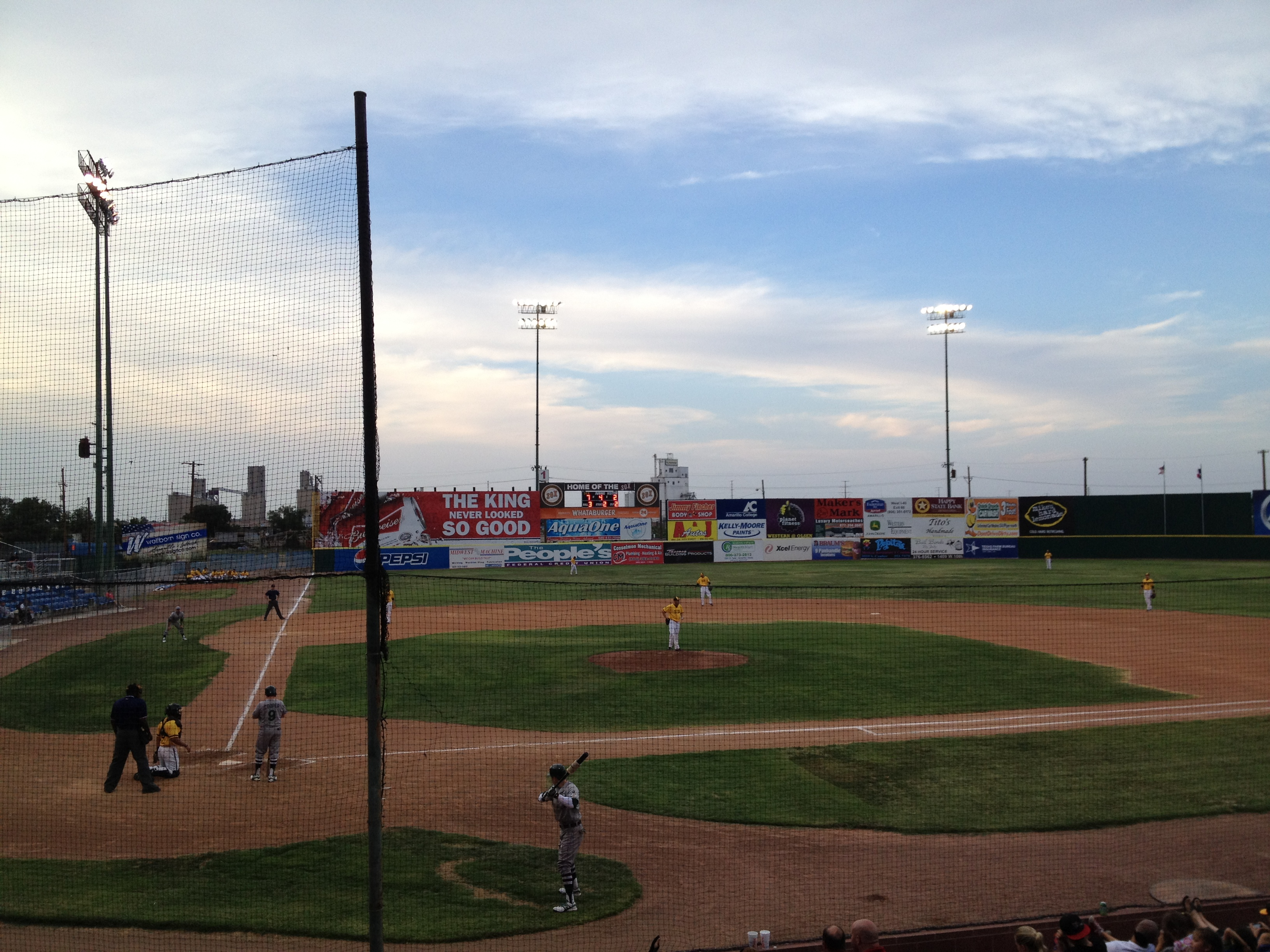
Amarillo National Bank Sox Stadium

The Amarillo Thunderheads, formerly known as the Amarillo Sox, were a professional minor league baseball team based in Amarillo, Texas. They were members of the American Association of Independent Professional Baseball, an independent baseball league unaffiliated with Major League Baseball, and played their home games at Potter County Memorial Stadium.

The team relocated to Amarillo in 2011. They were previously known as the Pensacola Pelicans, based in Pensacola, Florida. On December 2, 2014, they changed their name to the Amarillo Thunderheads. Following the 2015 season, the team was merged into the Texas AirHogs.

== History ==
In 2010, businessman Quint Studer sold his American Association franchise, the Pensacola Pelicans, to the Amarillo group as part of a series of purchases aimed at bringing an affiliated Double-A team to Pensacola.

The franchise secured a lease to Amarillo National Bank Stadium, replacing the Amarillo Dillas of United League Baseball, who were evicted after missing payments on their lease.

Former Amarillo Gold Sox and San Diego Padres pitcher Mark Lee was General Manager from 2006 to 2014. Stephanie Tucker, co-owner and General Manager of the Amarillo Venom, was named Executive Vice President/General Manager of the Sox following Lee's departure.

The franchise was originally going to be named the Amarillo Gold Sox after the longtime minor league team from the later 1930s through 1982. However, a trademark issue with the collegiate woodbat team the Marysville Gold Sox in California has forced the team to back away from using the name. Lee thus opted to name the team simply the Amarillo Sox, and revealed the team's name and logo at a January 5, 2011 press conference. Additionally, Lee named former California Angels player John Harris field manager.

After the 2014 season, the Sox were renamed the Amarillo Thunderheads.

On November 19, 2015, American Association commissioner Miles Wolff announced that there would no longer be interleague play between the AA and the Can-Am League (for which he is also commissioner) and that for the 2016 season the Thunderheads and the Grand Prairie AirHogs would operate as a joint team with 25 games in Amarillo and 25 games in Grand Prairie to make a 12 team league. Following the season the team announced that they would not be returning to Amarillo, and would play all games in Grand Prairie for 2017.

== Season-by-season record ==
Season	W - L Record	Winning Percentage	Finish	Playoffs
2011	44-56	.440	4th in South Division	Did not qualify for playoffs
2012	46-54	.460	4th in South Division	Did not qualify for playoffs
2013	52-48	.520	3rd in South Division	Did not qualify for playoffs
2014	37-62	.374	4th in South Division	Did not qualify for playoffs
2015	45-55	.450	4th in South Division	Did not qualify for playoffs

== See also ==
- Amarillo Gold Sox
- Amarillo Dillas
