= Pelican Park =

Pelican Park can refer to:

- Jim Spooner Field, Pensacola, Florida
- Pelican Park, a recreational park in St. Tammany Parish, Louisiana
- Pelican Park, former stadium of the New Orleans Pelicans baseball team in the early 20th century
- Pelican Park, a rugby ground in Wellington, South Africa
