= Potter County Memorial Stadium =

Baseball stadium in Amarillo, Texas, US

- Dilla Villa
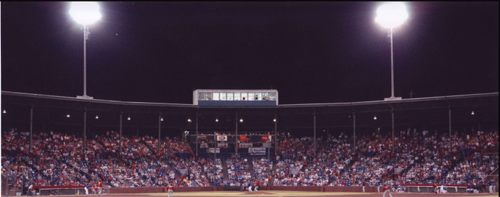
- Interactive map of Potter County Memorial Stadium
- Location: 3300 E. 3rd Street; Amarillo, Texas 79104
- Coordinates: 35.206334°N 101.799649°W
- Owner: Potter County
- Operator: Southern Independent Baseball
- Capacity: 8,500 (2008)
- Surface: Grass
- Field size: Left Field: 355 ft Deep Left-Center: 365 ft Center Field: 429 ft Deep Right-Center: 365 ft Right Field: 355 ft

Construction
- Groundbreaking: September 28, 1948
- Opened: May 12, 1949
- Renovated: October 11, 2005
- Demolished: 2023
- Cost: $250,000

Tenants
- West Texas A&M Buffaloes (NCAA D-II); Amarillo Gold Sox (TL) (1959–1982); Amarillo Dillas (TLL/CBL/ULB) (1994–2004, 2006–2010); Amarillo Sox/Thunderheads (AA) (2011–2015); Texas AirHogs (AA) (2016)

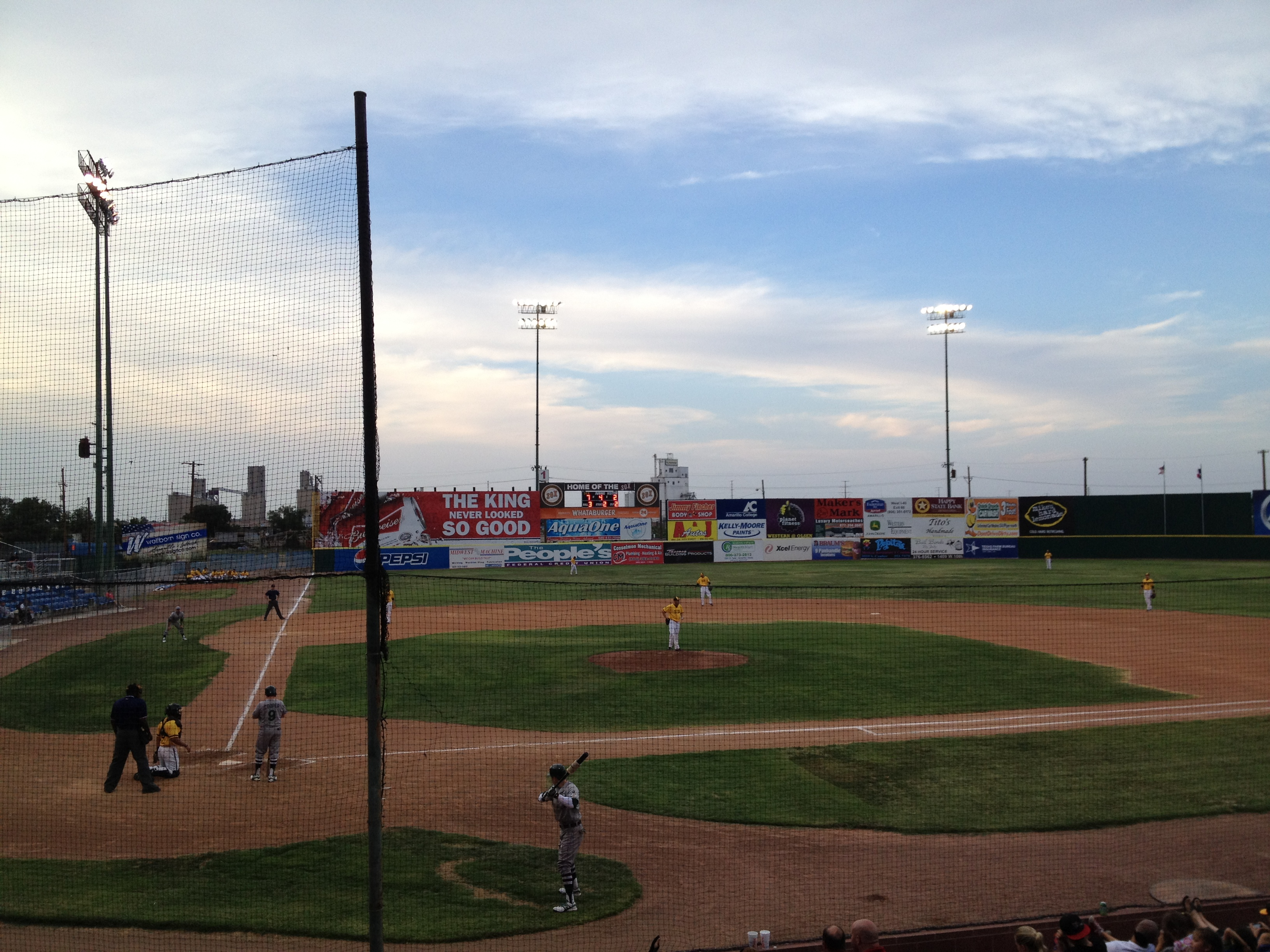
The infield and the outfield

Potter County Memorial Stadium was a baseball-only stadium in Amarillo, Texas. It was most recently home to the Texas AirHogs, a professional baseball team and member of the American Association, and the West Texas A&M Buffaloes baseball team, which is a member of the Division II Lone Star Conference. It was home to the Amarillo Dillas of United League Baseball until 2010. It broke ground in 1948, and opened in 1949. It is nicknamed Dilla Villa, dating back prior to Amarillo National Bank's purchase of naming rights when the Dillas made their first appearance in Amarillo in 1994.

Following the 2016 season it was announced the AirHogs would not be returning to Amarillo citing "deplorable" field conditions.

== Pre-Dilla era ==
The Potter County Memorial Stadium was home to several minor league baseball clubs before hosting the modern Amarillo Dillas squad. In PCMS's first season to host baseball, the Amarillo Gold Sox were in business. The Gold Sox would spend 1959–1965 and 1976–1982 hosting AA professional baseball in the Texas League. The Gold Sox had also played in Class A and B leagues in 1955–1958.

== Stadium features ==
There are several features of the Amarillo National Bank Dilla Villa that are architecturally unique. The stadium however is one of the few classic stadiums left from the older baseball era and unfortunately is dealing with its share of difficulties.

=== Seating ===
The Amarillo National Dilla Villa seats 8,500 people, with three levels of seating. It features 17 field level box seat sections. Situated just above the box seats, are the club level seats. These seats range from sections A to M, and house the better majority of the stadiums seats. The stadium features two general admission bleacher sections on the first and third base sides. Directly behind home plate in the upper level are 4 levels of luxury boxes used for groups and parties. On either side of the home plate luxury boxes are sections of the blue fold down seats, the only covered seats that are fold down. Aside from the main grandstand, metal bleachers and box seats sit further down the third base line, and a party deck further down the first base line.

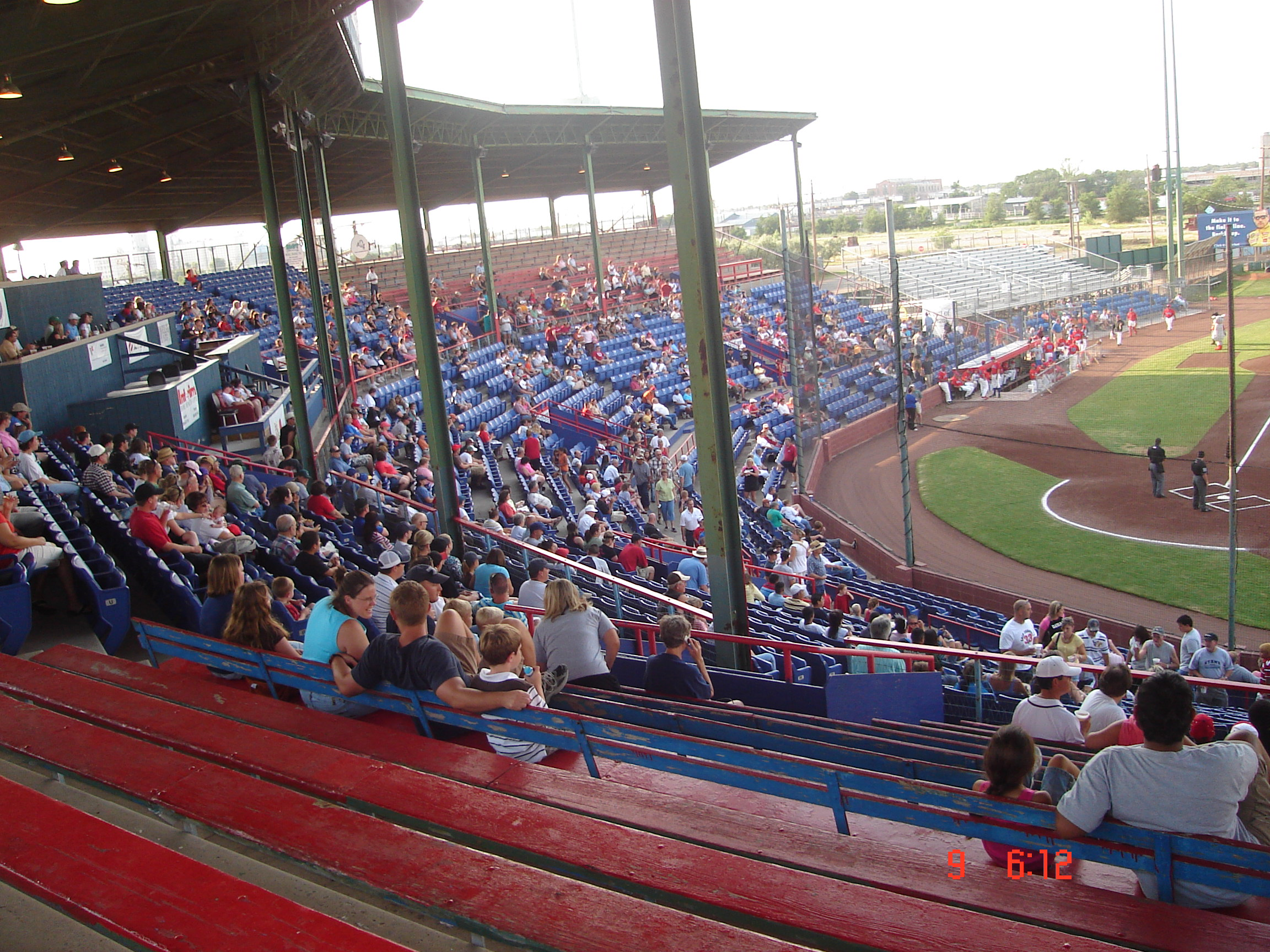
Dilla Villa against Edinburg in 2007

=== Concourse ===
The Dilla Villa houses one of the few non-major league stadiums in the country to have an upper and lower level concourse. The lower level concourse is the major one, leading to the main grandstand. It also houses 5 concession stands, 2 bars, and a souvenir shop. The upper level concourse is only accessible from the upper level, or from two staircases at the front of the ballpark. The concourse houses a beer stand, a concession stand, and the stadiums' bathrooms. No smoking is allowed in the ballpark, but there is a designated section behind the metal bleachers along the third base line.

=== Problems ===
The Potter County Memorial Stadium underwent a major renovation in the winter of 2005, replacing many of the badly needed renovations. The Central League's Dillas left behind many problems that the United League's Dillas successfully tackled.

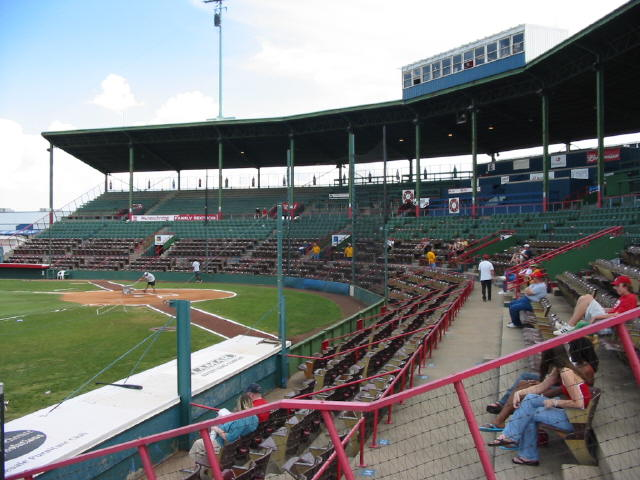
Before the renovations in 2006

Numerous seats in the stands were broken, cracked, or were stolen. Bleachers in the upper section had been separated and the paint was chipped. The grass was in poor shape, and the field itself was in bad shape. The backstop behind home plate was wooden, and was also rotting, and there were also numerous holes in the nets. Despite easily redoing these problems for the United League team, problems have begun to plague the Dillas.

==== Scoreboard ====
The Dillas were left with a barely active, older electronic scoreboard, which was in use back in the early 1990s. They made do with the scoreboard until the 2007 season, in which they bought a smaller, standard scoreboard just displaying score, inning, and strike-ball-out counts. Before the 2008 season began, a circuit board was stolen out of the scoreboard, which made it inoperable. The manufacturer would not sell the Dillas a new one because the scoreboard had never been paid for. Nonpayment of the scoreboard was due to the bankruptcy of the ULB's President Bradley Wendt.

==== Electricity ====
Several problems have existed with the field lighting fixtures and the concourse lighting at the Dilla Villa. Problems became apparent after a game between the Dillas and the Coyotes was cancelled after hurricane-like weather blew in. That night, two of the transformers powering the Dilla Villa exploded. Afterwards, three subsequent games were cancelled due to light failures at the stadium.

== New stadium ==
Rumors of a new ballpark being built along the Interstate 27 and Hollywood Road parts of Amarillo have been spurred by the serious advancement in the revitalization of downtown Amarillo, Texas. Several case studies were conducted on whether or not a new ballpark would be feasible in downtown Amarillo. The study revealed that a multipurpose event venue such as a ballpark would be a feasible investment. Some rendering of a possible downtown set-up have shown a ballpark just south of the Amarillo Civic Center at 8th Avenue and Buchanan St. A ballpark, along with many other projects, have become serious discussion and construction could take place as soon as 2016.

== Questionable future ==
In May 2015, a non-binding referendum was voted on for funding a new baseball stadium, with a margin of 52-48% voting "yes".After the Airhogs departure in 2016, Amarillo was left without a professional baseball team. However, on June 21, 2017, Elsinore Sports Group announced that the San Antonio Missions would be moving to Amarillo as the Colorado Springs Sky Sox were moving to San Antonio, with an understanding that a new stadium would be built. Shortly after the announcement, San Jacinto, a local private school signed a five-year lease to play at the stadium. In February 2018, the new stadium broke ground in downtown Amarillo on the property formerly occupied by Coca-Cola. On May 30, 2018, it was announced that the franchise would be named the Amarillo Sod Poodles. In January 2019, it was announced that the Sod Poodles would begin play at Hodgetown on April 8, 2019 against the Midland RockHounds. As of March 2019, no future plans have been made regarding Potter County Memorial Stadium beyond 2022.

In March 2023 Potter County and Tri-State fair officials that Potter County Memorial Stadium would be demolished by September 2023 just in time for the tri state fair to begin.

Events and tenants
Preceded by Edinburg Stadium	Host of the ULB All-Star Game; Potter County Memorial Stadium; 2007	Succeeded by Foster Field
