= Amarillo Gold Sox =

- 1939; (1939–1942; 1946–1963; 1965–1974; 1976–1982); Amarillo, Texas

Minor league affiliations
- Previous classes: Double-A (1959–1963; 1965–1974; 1976–1982); Class A (1956–1958); Class B (1955); Class C (1946–1954); Class D (1939–1942)
- League: Texas League (1959–1963; 1965–1974; 1976–1982)
- Previous leagues: Western League (1956–1958); West Texas–New Mexico League (1939–1942; 1946–1955)

Major league affiliations
- Previous teams: San Diego Padres (1976–1982); San Francisco Giants (1968–1974); Houston Astros (1965–1967); Chicago Cubs (1963); New York Yankees (1960–1962); Baltimore Orioles (1959); Boston Braves (1947)

Minor league titles
- League titles: 1948, 1952, 1961, 1976
- Division titles: 1969, 1971, 1976
- Second-half titles: 1980, 1981

Team data
- Previous names: Amarillo Gold Sox; Sonics (1965–1967); Giants (1968–1974)
- Previous parks: Potter County Memorial Stadium (1959–1963; 1965–1974; 1976–1982)

The Amarillo Gold Sox was the name of an American minor league baseball franchise that represented the city of Amarillo, Texas, in the Class D West Texas–New Mexico League, the Class A Western League and the Double-A Texas League at various times between 1939 and 1982.

== Team history ==
Amarillo's first minor league club, the Gassers, appeared in 1923. While the minor leagues weathered the economic troubles of the Great Depression, Amarillo was frequently unrepresented in professional baseball.

But in 1939, Amarillo joined the WT-NM League as the Gold Sox when the loop expanded from six to eight clubs. The Gold Sox played in the league until the circuit suspended operations due to World War II on July 5, 1942. In 1946, the postwar West Texas–New Mexico League was reborn as a Class C league and the Gold Sox returned to the field. In 1948, led by skipper Buck "Leaky" Fausett, the team won its first league playoff title. (It would win the playoffs again in 1952.)

In 1953, Alvin Lakind played for the team and batted .300; his grandson Jared Lakind went on to play minor league baseball 60 years later. In 1955, Amarillo won the regular-season pennant and led the WT-NML in attendance, but it was a Pyrrhic victory, as the league folded for good at the close of the season. The Gold Sox, however, remained alive by moving up to the Western League as an unaffiliated club. It enjoyed success on the field, winning the 1956 regular-season title, and at the gate, leading the league in attendance in its final season, 1958.

In 1959, the Texas League admitted Amarillo as a farm system affiliate of the Baltimore Orioles. From 1960–1962, the Gold Sox were the Double-A farm club of the New York Yankees, winning the 1961 regular-season title. In 1963, the Chicago Cubs were the Gold Sox' parent team. But the Gold Sox disappeared from the baseball map when the 1964 Texas League contracted, and when Amarillo returned to the TL in 1965, it was known as the Sonics from 1965–1967 and the Giants from 1968–1974. In 1975, the franchise moved to Lafayette, Louisiana, te become the Lafayette Drillers and Amarillo was again left out of the Texas League.

But after only one season without professional baseball, in 1976, the Amarillo Gold Sox returned to the circuit, as the San Diego Padres moved their Double-A farm club from Alexandria, Louisiana. In their first season back in the Texas League under their old nickname, the Gold Sox won the West Division title and playoff championship, but a series of last-place teams and only one other division title followed through 1982. The Gold Sox moved to Beaumont, Texas prior to the 1983 season and became the Beaumont Golden Gators. In 1981 the Gold Sox roster included future major leaguers Tony Gwynn, Mark Thurmond, Andy Hawkins and Dave Dravecky.

In 2009, an Amarillo age-7-and-under select baseball team affiliated with the YMCA paid homage to the former team by continuing the Gold Sox name. The team has stayed together for several seasons and is now a 12u USSSA team.

== Name trademark controversy ==
On December 3, 2010, it was announced that an expansion team in the American Association would begin playing at the Potter County Memorial Stadium in Spring 2011, replacing the Amarillo Dillas of United League Baseball who were evicted from the stadium for financial issues. Former player Mark Lee was named the team's new general manager. The team was to have been named the Gold Sox.

However, on December 8, 2010, it was reported that the Amarillo team will not legally be able to use the Gold Sox name as the collegiate woodbat Marysville Gold Sox in California had trademarked the name in February 2002.

On December 10, 2010, the editorial page of the Amarillo newspaper of record, the Amarillo Globe-News, said, "It would be in the Amarillo team's best interest to look for another name".

== See also ==
- Amarillo Sox
