= Pensacola streetcar strike of 1908 =

Pensacola streetcar strike
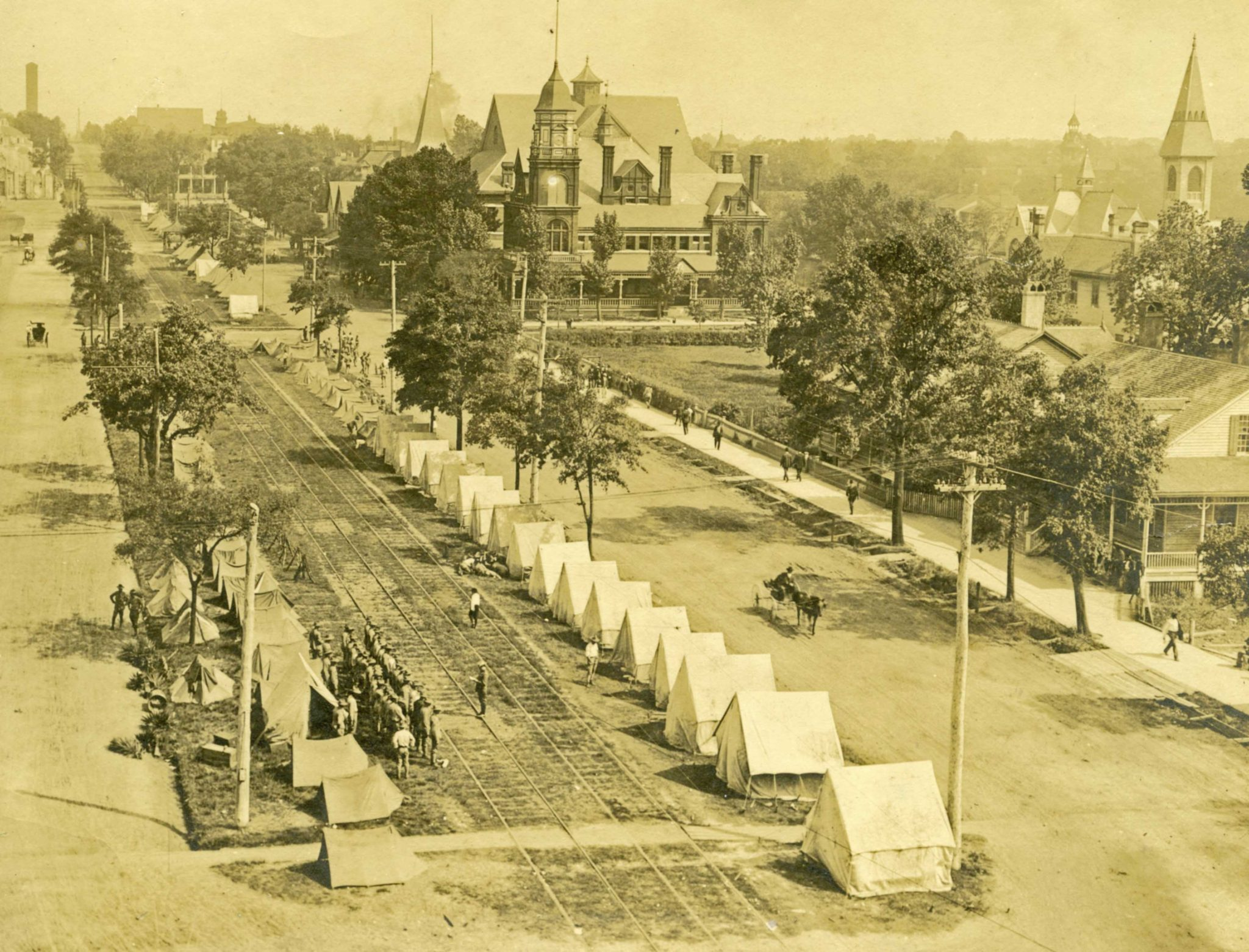
- More than 500 State troops descended upon Pensacola to enforce Martial Law during the strike.
- Date: April 5 – May 13, 1908
- Location: Pensacola, Florida
- Methods: Striking

Parties
Streetcar workers	Pensacola Electric Co. Florida National Guard

Casualties
- Death: 1

A strike of streetcar operators took place in Pensacola, Florida from April 5 to May 13, 1908. It was staged by employees of the Pensacola Electric Company over a company rule requiring workers whom the company had suspended for whatever reason to report to the company's car barn thrice daily for a roll call. During the 39-day strike, open violence erupted in Pensacola's streets, resulting in at least one death, after which martial law was declared and the state militia was sent to provide security to the company strikebreakers.

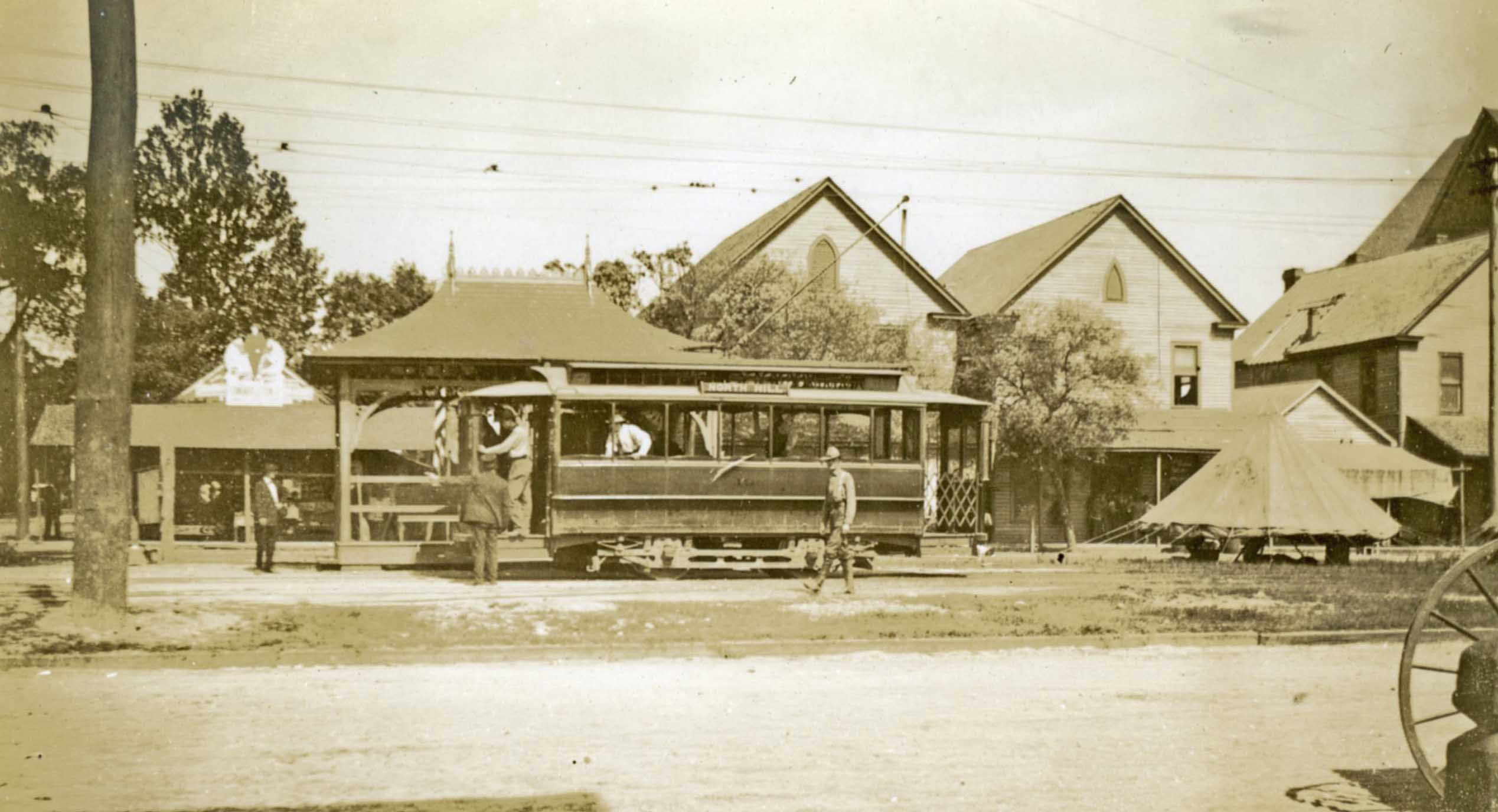
Streetcar travels past State militia encampments in the Palafox Street median.

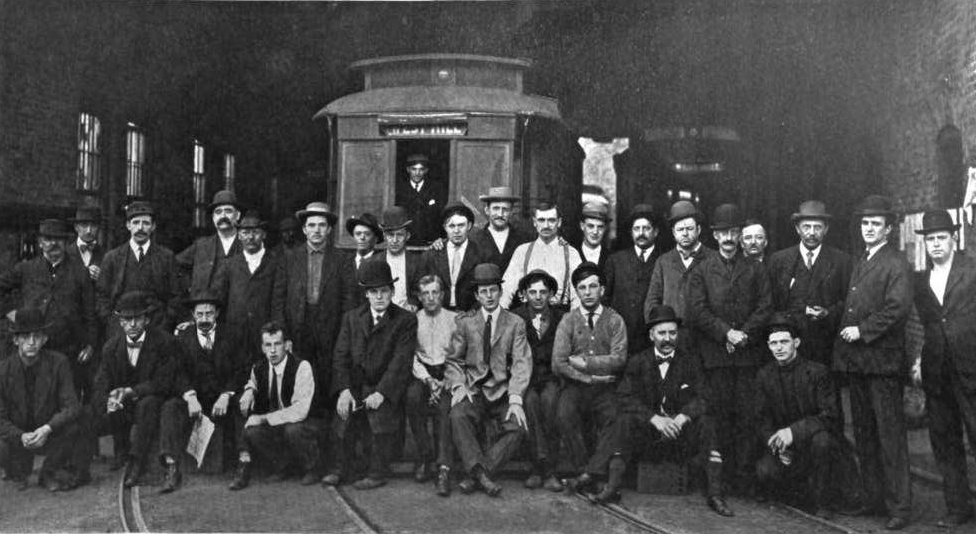
Strikebreakers pose at the Pensacola Electric Company's streetcar barn.
