= John Harris (first baseman) =

American baseball player (born 1954)

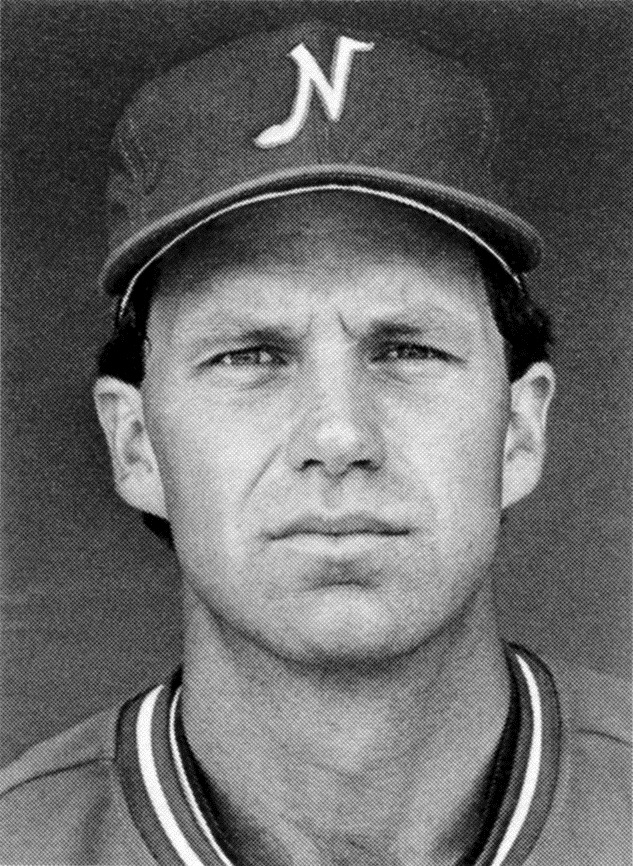
- Harris with the Nashville Sounds in 1985
- First baseman / Outfielder
- Born: September 13, 1954 (age 70); Portland, Oregon
- Batted: Left Threw: Left

MLB debut
- September 26, 1979, for the California Angels

Last MLB appearance
- October 3, 1981, for the California Angels

MLB statistics
- Batting average: .258
- Home runs: 5
- Runs batted in: 16
- Stats at Baseball Reference

Teams
- California Angels (1979–1981)

John Thomas Harris (born September 13, 1954) is an American former professional baseball player. He played in Major League Baseball (MLB) for the California Angels. He was formerly the manager for the Southern Maryland Blue Crabs of the Atlantic League of Professional Baseball.

Harris was born in Portland, Oregon. He attended Lubbock Christian University. He was chosen in the 29th round of the 1976 Major League Baseball draft. He played in the major leagues from 1979 until October 1981 — all with the California Angels.

He was the hitting coach of the Sioux Falls Canaries of the American Association in 2009 and alternated between the Shreveport-Bossier Captains in the American Association and the Amarillo Dillas of the United League in 2010 as the hitting coach.

In 2011, Harris was hired as the field manager of the Amarillo Sox of the American Association.
