= Pensacola, Florida =

- City
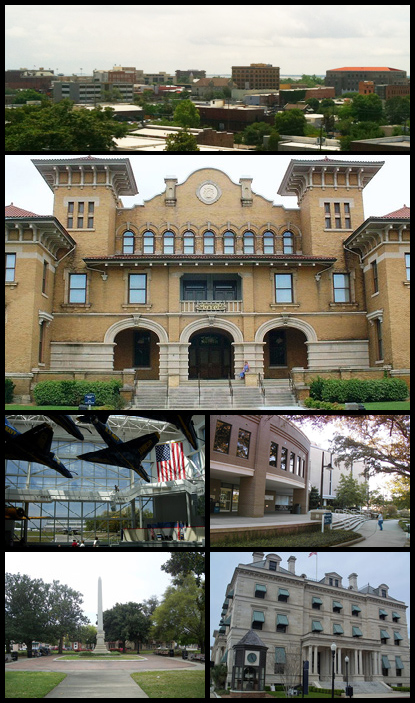
- Clockwise from top: Pensacola skyline, Pensacola Museum of History, University of West Florida Library, Escambia County Courthouse, William Dudley Chipley Obelisk, National Naval Aviation Museum

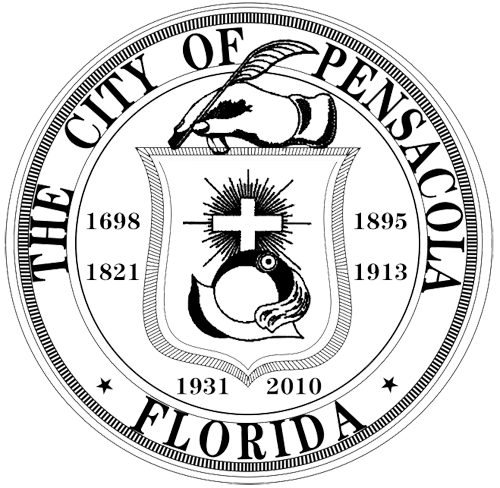
- Seal Logo
- Nicknames: "The Upside of Florida", "The City of Five Flags", "Festival City of the South", and "Cradle of Naval Aviation"
- Motto(s): "Florida's First & Future", "Where Florida Begins"
- Interactive map of Pensacola, Florida
- Location within Florida Location within the United States
- Coordinates: 30°24′26.6″N 87°13′07.1″W
- Country: United States of America
- State: Florida
- County: Escambia
- First settled: August 15, 1559
- Resettled: November 1698
- Incorporated: 1822
- Founder: Don Tristan de Luna

Government
  - Type: Mayor–Council
  - Mayor: D. C. Reeves (R)
  - President: Jared Moore • Vice President Allison Patton
  - Councilmembers: District 1: Jennifer Brahier; District 2: Charles Bare; District 3: Casey Jones; District 4: Jared Moore; District 5: Teniadé Broughton; District 6: Allison Patton; District 7: Delarian Wiggins
  - City Administrator: Capt. Tim Kinsella, Jr., USN (Ret)
  - City Clerk: Ericka Burnett

Area
  - City: 41.127 sq mi (106.518 km^{2})
  - Land: 22.773 sq mi (58.982 km^{2})
  - Water: 18.353 sq mi (47.535 km^{2}) 44.62%
  - Urban: 269.49 sq mi (697.98 km^{2})
  - Metro: 1,669.51 sq mi (4,324.00 km^{2})
- Elevation: 33 ft (10 m)

Population (2020)
  - City: 54,319
  - Estimate (2023): 53,724
  - Rank: US: 749th FL: 58th
  - Density: 2,360/sq mi (911/km^{2})
  - Urban: 390,172 (US: 108th)
  - Urban density: 1,486/sq mi (573.8/km^{2})
  - Metro: 530,090 (US: 107th)
  - Metro density: 317.5/sq mi (122.59/km^{2})
- Demonym: Pensacolian
- Time zone: UTC−6 (Central (CST))
  - Summer (DST): UTC−5 (CDT)
- ZIP Codes: 32501–32509, 32511–32514, 32516, 32520–32524, 32526, 32534, 32559, 32591
- Area codes: 850 and 448
- FIPS code: 12-55925
- GNIS feature ID: 2404503
- Website: cityofpensacola.com

Pensacola (Note: (/ˌpɛnsəˈkoʊlə/ PEN-sə-KOH-lə)) is a city in the Florida Panhandle. It is the county seat and only city in Escambia County. It is the principal city of the Pensacola Metropolitan Area, which had 509,905 residents in the 2020 census. The incorporated city’s population was 54,312 at the 2020 census.

Pensacola was first settled by the Spanish Empire in 1559, preceding the establishment of St. Augustine by six years, but was abandoned due to a significant hurricane and not resettled until 1698. Pensacola is a seaport on Pensacola Bay, which is protected by the barrier island of Santa Rosa and connects to the Gulf of Mexico. A large United States Naval Air Station, the first and continuously largest in the United States, is located in Pensacola. It is the base of the Blue Angels flight-demonstration team and the National Naval Aviation Museum. The University of West Florida is situated north of the city center, as well as Pensacola Christian College, and Pensacola State College.

The area was originally inhabited by Muskogean-speaking peoples. The Pensacola people lived there at the time of European contact, and Creek people frequently visited and traded from present-day southern Alabama and Mississippi and southeast Louisiana. Spanish explorer Tristán de Luna founded a short-lived settlement in 1559. In 1698, the Spanish established a presidio in the area, from which the modern city gradually developed. The area changed hands several times, as European powers competed in North America. During Florida's British rule (1763–1781), dilapidated Spanish-built fortifications were repaired and strengthened.

It was nicknamed "the City of Five Flags", due to the five governments that have ruled it during its history: the flags of Spain (Castile), France, Great Britain, the United States of America, and the Confederate States of America. Other nicknames include "World's Whitest Beaches" (due to the white sand of Florida panhandle beaches), "Cradle of Naval Aviation", "Western Gate to the Sunshine State", "America's First Settlement", "Emerald Coast", and "P-Cola". Its latest nickname is "The Upside of Florida."

== History ==
Historical affiliations

Spanish Empire 1559–1719, 1722–1763 and 1781–1821
French Empire 1719–1722
British Empire 1763–1781
United States 1821–1861 and 1862 to present
Confederate States of America 1861–1862

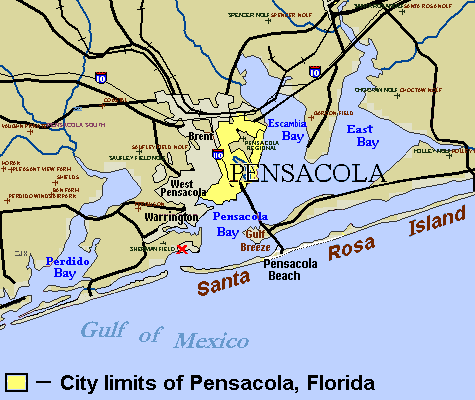
Pensacola: Site of 1698 settlement near Fort Barrancas is marked "X" (above left end of Santa Rosa Island).

=== Before European contact ===
The original inhabitants of the Pensacola Bay area were Native American peoples. At the time of European contact, a Muskogean-speaking tribe known to the Spanish as the Pensacola, lived in the region. This name was not recorded until 1677, but the tribe appears to be the source of the name "Pensacola" for the bay and thence the city. Creek people, also Muskogean-speaking, came regularly from present-day southern Alabama to trade, so the peoples were part of a broader regional and even continental network of relations.

The best-known Pensacola culture site in terms of archeology is the large Bottle Creek site, located 59 miles (95 km) west of Pensacola north of Mobile, Alabama. This site has at least 18 large earthwork mounds, five of which are arranged around a central plaza. Its main occupation was from 1250 to 1550 CE. It was a ceremonial center for the Pensacola people and a gateway to their society. This site would have had easy access by a dugout canoe, the main mode of transportation used by the Pensacola.

=== Spanish ===
The area's written recorded history begins in the 16th century, with documentation by Spanish explorers, who were the first Europeans to reach the area. The expeditions of Pánfilo de Narváez in 1528 and Hernando de Soto in 1539 both visited Pensacola Bay, the latter of which documented the name "Bay of Ochuse".

In the Age of Sail, Pensacola was the busiest port on the Gulf Coast, having the deepest harbor.

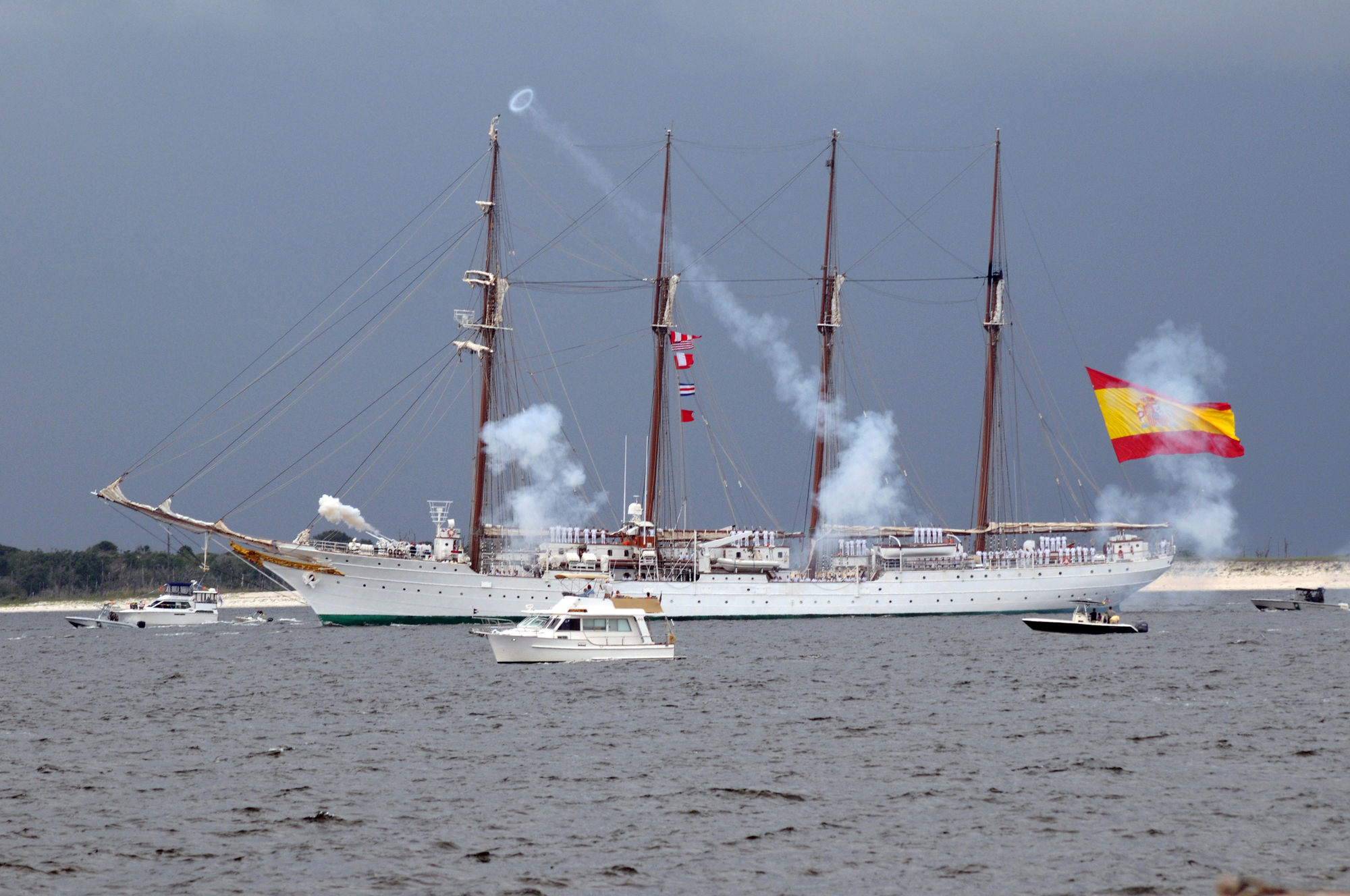
The Spanish Navy training ship Juan Sebastian de Elcano fires a 21-gun salute in honor of Pensacola's 450th anniversary in 2009.

On August 15, 1559, Tristán de Luna y Arellano landed with some 1,500 people on 11 ships from Veracruz, Mexico. The expedition was to establish an outpost, ultimately called Santa María de Ochuse by Luna, as a base for Spanish efforts to colonize Santa Elena (present-day Parris Island, South Carolina), but the colony was decimated by a hurricane on September 19, 1559, which killed an unknown number of sailors and colonists, sank six ships, grounded a seventh, and ruined supplies.

The survivors struggled to survive, most moving inland to the region of modern central Alabama for several months in 1560 before returning to the coast, but in 1561 the effort was abandoned. Some of the survivors eventually sailed to Santa Elena, but another storm struck there. Survivors made their way to Cuba and finally returned to Pensacola, where the remaining 50 at Pensacola were taken back to Veracruz. The viceroy's advisors thus concluded the region too dangerous to settle, ignoring it for centuries.

In the late 17th century, the French began exploring the lower Mississippi River, with the intention of colonizing the region as part of New France. Fearful that Spanish territory would be threatened, the Spanish founded a new settlement in western Florida. In 1698, they established a fortified town near what is now Fort Barrancas, laying the foundation for permanent European-dominated settlement of the modern city of Pensacola. The Spanish built three presidios in Pensacola:

- Presidio Santa Maria de Galve (1698–1719): The presidio included fort San Carlos de Austria (east of present-day Fort Barrancas) and a village with church.
- Presidio Isla de Santa Rosa (1722–1752): This next presidio was on western Santa Rosa Island near the site of present-day Fort Pickens, but hurricanes battered the island in 1741 and 1752. The garrison was moved to the mainland.
- Presidio San Miguel de Panzacola (1754–1763): The final presidio was built about 5 miles (8 km) east of the first presidio; the present-day historic district of downtown Pensacola, named from "Panzacola", developed around the fort.

During the early years of settlement, a triracial creole society developed. As a fortified trading post, the Spanish had mostly men stationed here. Some married or had unions with Pensacola, Creek, or African women, both slave and free, and their descendants created a mixed-race population of mestizos and mulattos. The Spanish encouraged fugitive slaves from the Southern Colonies to come to Florida as a refuge, promising freedom in exchange for conversion to Catholicism. Most went to the area around St. Augustine, but escaped slaves also reached Pensacola.

=== British ===
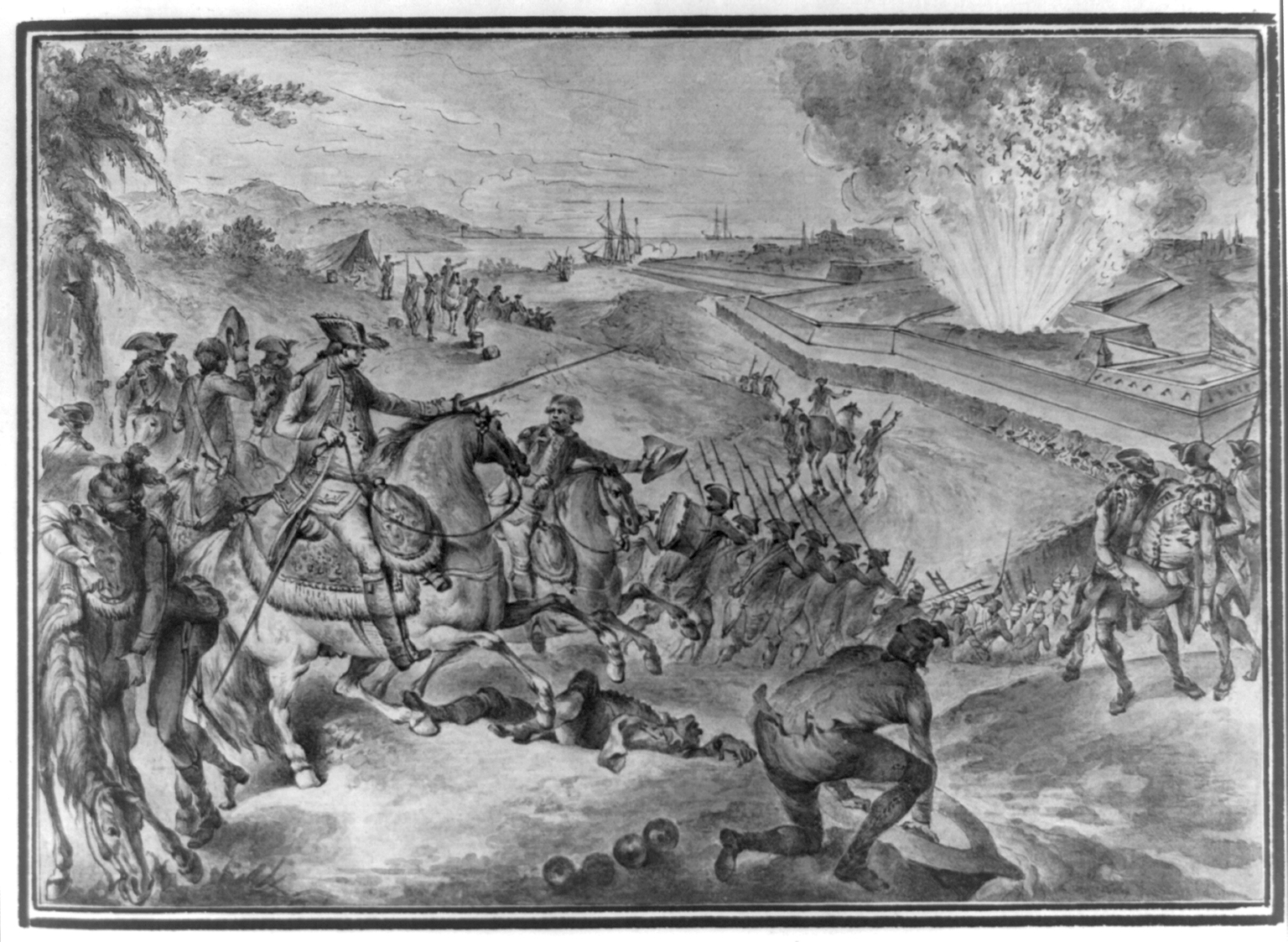
Engraving (1783) depicting the Siege of Pensacola

After years of settlement there, the Spanish ceded Florida to the British in 1763 as a result of an exchange following British victory over both France and Spain in the French and Indian War (the North American theater of the Seven Years' War), and French cession of its territories in North America. Nearly all the Spanish population evacuated the city and traveled by ship to Veracruz, Mexico, and Cuba. The British designated Pensacola as the capital of their new colony of West Florida. From 1763, the British strengthened defenses around the mainland area of fort San Carlos de Barrancas, building the Royal Navy Redoubt. George Johnstone was appointed as the first British governor, and in 1764, a colonial assembly was established. The structure of the colony was modeled after the existing British colonies in America, as opposed to French Canada, which was based on a different structure. West Florida was invited to send delegates to the First Continental Congress, which was convened to present colonial grievances against the British Parliament to George III, but along with several other colonies, including East Florida, they declined the invitation. Once the American War of Independence had broken out, the colonists remained overwhelmingly loyal to the Crown. In 1778, the Willing Expedition proceeded with a small force down the Mississippi, ransacking estates and plantations, until they were eventually defeated by a local militia. In the wake of this, the area received a small number of British reinforcements.

British military resources were limited and Pensacola ranked fairly low on their list of priorities. So, only small token number of British military forces were ever sent to defend Pensacola. This was in contrast to colonies such as South Carolina, where large numbers of British soldiers were sent. After Spain joined the American Revolution in 1779 on the side of the rebels, Spanish forces captured the city in the 1781 Siege of Pensacola, gaining control of West Florida. After the war, the British officially ceded both West Florida and East Florida to Spain as part of the postwar peace settlement.

In 1785, many Creek from southern Alabama and Georgia came to trade, and Pensacola developed as a major trade center. It was a garrison town, predominantly males in the military or trade. Americans made raids into the area, and settlers pressured the federal government to gain control of this territory.

=== United States ===
In the final stages of the War of 1812, American troops launched an offensive on Pensacola against the Spanish and British garrisons protecting the city, which surrendered after two days of fighting. Pensacola was conquered again by the US in 1818. In 1819, Spain and the United States negotiated the Adams–Onís Treaty, by which Spain recognized the American control over Florida in exchange of the American recognition of Spanish control over Texas. A Spanish census of 1820 indicated 181 households in the town, with a third being of mixed blood. The people were predominantly French and Spanish Creole. Indians in the area were noted through records, travelers' accounts, and paintings of the era, including some by George Washington Sully and George Catlin. Creek women were also recorded in marriages to Spanish men, in court records or deeds.

In 1821, with Andrew Jackson as provisional governor, Pensacola became part of the United States. The city was officially incorporated as a municipality in 1822. The Creek continued to interact with European Americans and African Americans, but the dominant Whites increasingly imposed their binary racial classifications: white and black ("colored", within which were included free people of color, including Indians). However, American Indians and mestizos were identified separately in court and Catholic church records, and as Indians in censuses up until 1840, attesting to their presence in the society. After that, the Creek were not separately identified as Indian, but the people did not disappear. Even after removal of many Seminole to Indian Territory, Indians, often of mixed race, but culturally identifying as Muskogean, lived throughout Florida.

St. Michael's Cemetery was established in the 18th century at a location in a south-central part of the city, which developed as the downtown area. Initially owned by the Church of St. Michael, it is now owned and managed by St. Michael's Cemetery Foundation of Pensacola, Inc. Preliminary studies indicate that it has over 3,200 marked burials, as well as a large number unmarked.

Tensions between the White community and Indians tended to increase during the removal era. In addition, an increasing proportion of Anglo Americans, who constituted the majority of Whites by 1840, led to a hardening of racial discrimination in the area. Disapproval arose of White men living with women of color, which had previously been accepted. In 1853, the legislature passed a bill prohibiting Indians from living in the state, and provided for capture and removal to Indian Territory.

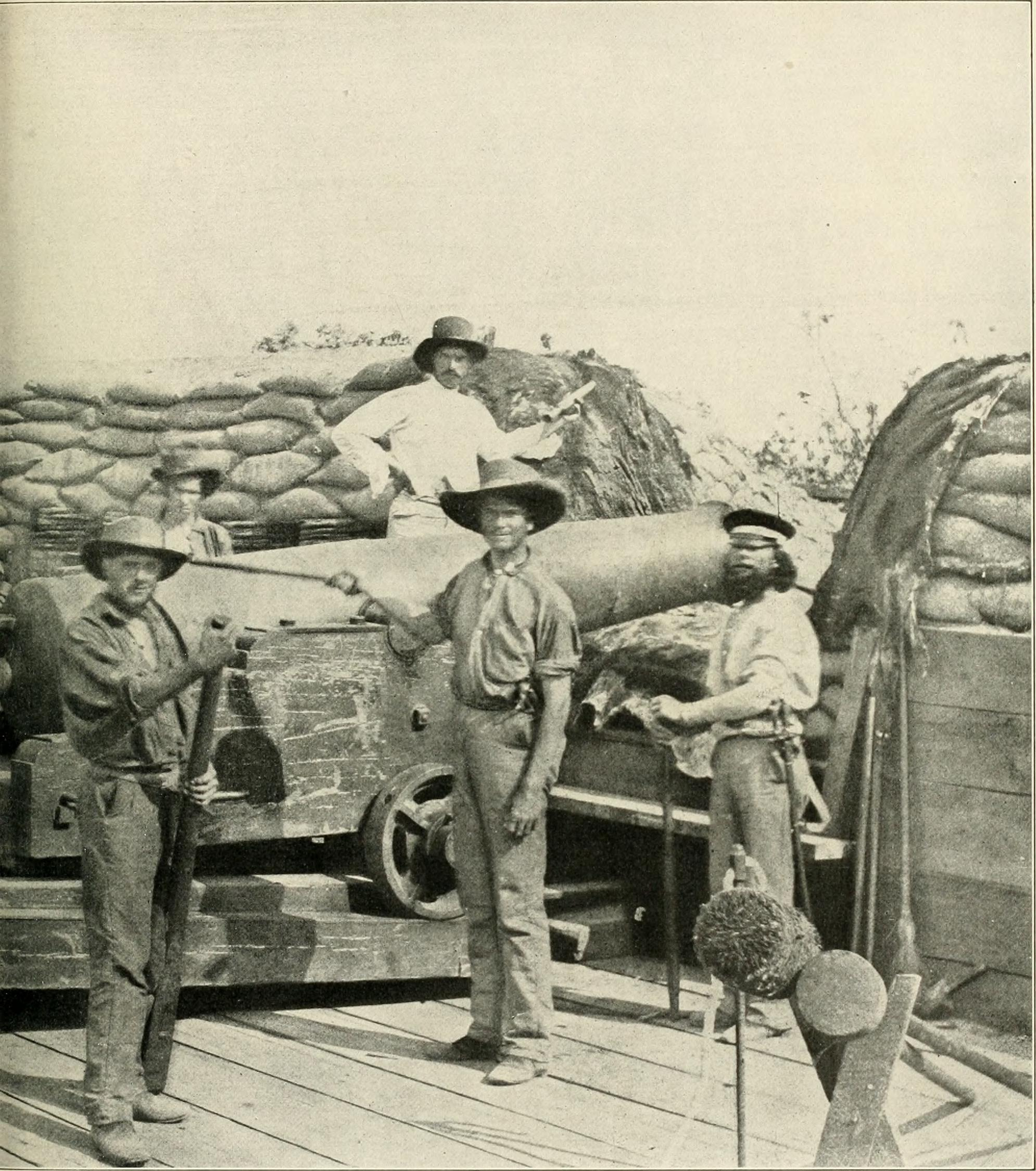
Confederate battery north of Fort McRee at Pensacola, Florida

While the bill excluded mixed-race Indians and those already living in White communities, they went "underground" to escape persecution. No Indians were listed in late 19th- and early 20th-century censuses for Escambia County. People of Indian descent were forced into the White or Black communities by appearance, and officially, in terms of records, "disappeared". This pattern was repeated in many Southern settlements. Children of White fathers and Indian mothers were not designated as Indian in the late 19th century, whereas children of Blacks or Mulattos were classified within the Black community, related to laws during the slavery years.

Pensacola experienced the Civil War when in 1861, Confederate forces lost the nearby Battle of Santa Rosa Island and federal forces of the United States subsequently failed to win the Battle of Pensacola. After the fall of New Orleans in 1862, the Confederacy abandoned the city and it was occupied by the North. In June 1861, the Pensacola Guards were mustered in as a company in the 1st Florida Infantry Regiment.

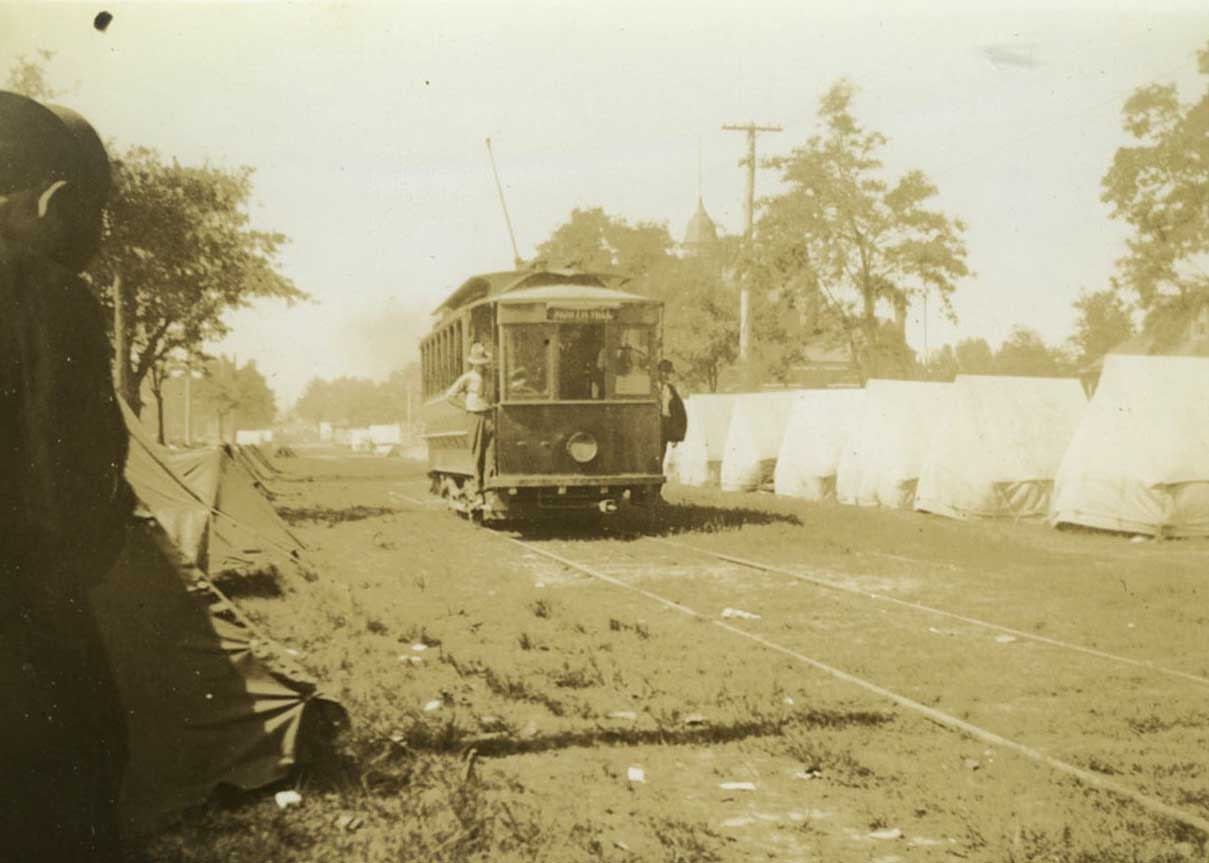
A North Hill line streetcar travels south down Palafox Street past State militia encampments.

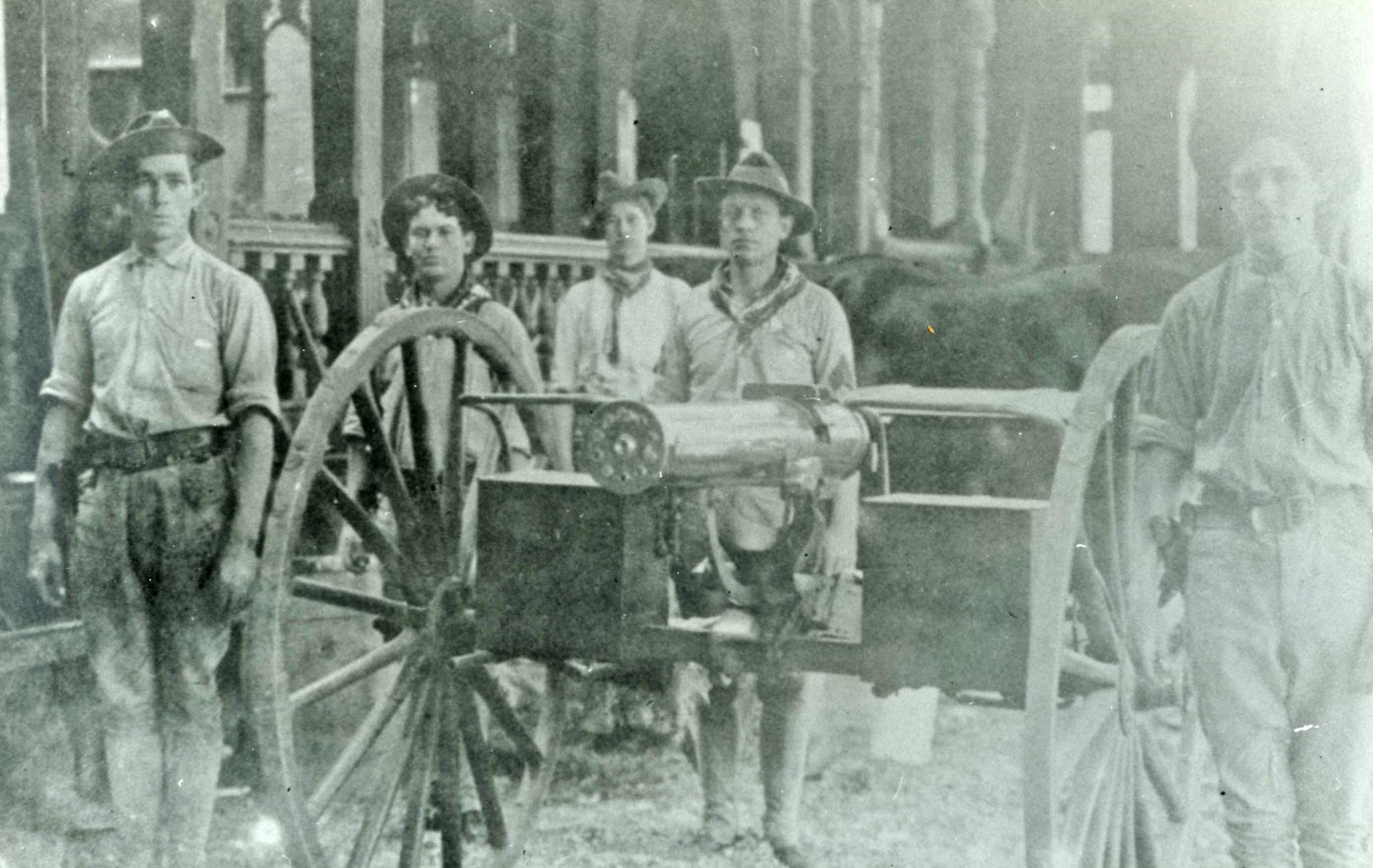
State militiamen posing in front of a Gatling gun brought in when martial law was declared

Pensacola streetcar strike of 1908

In 1907–1908, 116 Creeks in Pensacola applied for the Eastern Cherokee enrollment, thinking that all Indians were eligible to enroll. Based on Alabama census records, most of these individuals have been found to be descendants of Creeks who had migrated to the Pensacola area from southern Alabama after Indian removal of the 1830s.

In 1908, a citywide streetcar strike occurred in the city, which led to state militia being stationed in the city and martial law being declared.

== Geography ==
Pensacola is located on the north side of Pensacola Bay. It is 59 miles (95 km) east of Mobile, Alabama, and 196 miles (315 km) west of Tallahassee, the capital of Florida. Although the incorporated city limits of Pensacola are relatively small, numerous census-designated places (CDPs) are located immediately outside of the incorporated city limits that are widely considered to be Pensacola. Due to their proximity to the city limits, their mailing addresses are listed as Pensacola, with a lack of independent government services apart from Pensacola and Escambia County. While residents of these CDPs have rejected incorporation into Pensacola in previous referendums, they largely identify as residents of Pensacola. Examples of these CDPs include Goulding, Ferry Pass, Ensley, Bellview, Myrtle Grove, Warrington, Brent, and West Pensacola.

According to the United States Census Bureau, the city has a total area of 41.127 square miles (106.52 km^{2}), of which 22.773 square miles (58.98 km^{2}) is land and 18.354 square miles (47.54 km^{2}), or 44.62%, is water.

The land is sloped up northward from Pensacola Bay, with most of the city at an elevation above that at which a potential hurricane storm surge could affect.

=== Climate ===
Weather statistics since the late 20th century have been recorded at the airport. The city has seen single-digit temperatures (below 10 °F; −12 °C) on three occasions: 5 °F (−15 °C) on January 21, 1985; 7 °F (−14 °C) on February 13, 1899; and 8 °F (−13 °C) on January 11, 1982. According to the Köppen climate classification system, Pensacola has a humid subtropical climate (Köppen: Cfa), with short, mild winters and hot, humid summers. Typical summer conditions have highs in the lower 90s °F (32–34 °C) and lows in the mid-70s °F (23–24 °C). Afternoon or evening thunderstorms are common during the summer months. Due partly to the coastal location, temperatures above 100 °F (38 °C) are relatively rare and last occurred in June 2011, when two of the first four days of the month recorded highs reaching the century mark. The highest temperature ever recorded in the city was 106 °F (41 °C) on July 14, 1980.

In the 1991–2020 climate normals, the daily average temperature in January is 53.2 °F (11.8 °C). Freezing temperatures occur an average of 11 days per winter, with the average first and last dates for a freeze being December 12 and February 14, giving Pensacola an average growing season of 301 days. However, the relatively recent winter season of 2018-19 did not record a freeze, the median first and last freeze dates are earlier and later than the averages of December 12 and February 14, and the median number of freezes per season is 11 or fewer. The mean coldest temperature reached in a given winter season is about 24 °F (−4.4 °C), although the median is slightly higher, at no colder than 25 °F (−3.9 °C) most years, placing Pensacola in USDA zone 9b. Temperatures below 20 °F (−6.7 °C) are very rare and last occurred on January 8, 2015, when a low of 19 °F (−7.2 °C) was seen. The lowest temperature ever recorded in the city was 5 °F (−15 °C) on January 21, 1985.

Snow is rare in Pensacola, but does occasionally fall. The most recent snowfall event occurred on January 21, 2025, which produced record-breaking accumulations of up to 9.4 inches (24 cm) within the city limits and near-blizzard conditions. The snow event previous to it occurred on December 9, 2017. The city receives 68.31 inches (1,740 mm) of precipitation per year, with a slightly more rainy season in the summer. The rainiest month is July, with 7.89 inches (200 mm), with May being the driest month at 3.90 inches (99 mm). In June 2012 over one foot (300 mm) of rain fell on Pensacola and adjacent areas, leading to widespread flooding. On April 29, 2014, Pensacola was drenched by at least 20 inches of rain within a 24-hour period, causing the worst flooding in 30 years.

The city suffered a major blow on February 23, 2016, when a large EF3 wedge tornado hit the northwest part of Pensacola, causing major damage and several injuries.

Climate data for Pensacola, Florida (Pensacola Int'l), 1991–2020 normals, extremes 1879–present
| Month | Jan | Feb | Mar | Apr | May | Jun | Jul | Aug | Sep | Oct | Nov | Dec | Year |
|---|---|---|---|---|---|---|---|---|---|---|---|---|---|
| Record high °F (°C) | 81 (27) | 84 (29) | 90 (32) | 96 (36) | 102 (39) | 102 (39) | 106 (41) | 105 (41) | 102 (39) | 97 (36) | 89 (32) | 81 (27) | 106 (41) |
| Mean maximum °F (°C) | 74.9 (23.8) | 77.4 (25.2) | 82.5 (28.1) | 85.2 (29.6) | 92.6 (33.7) | 95.7 (35.4) | 97.0 (36.1) | 96.2 (35.7) | 94.8 (34.9) | 88.9 (31.6) | 82.3 (27.9) | 77.6 (25.3) | 98.4 (36.9) |
| Mean daily maximum °F (°C) | 62.7 (17.1) | 66.4 (19.1) | 72.0 (22.2) | 77.6 (25.3) | 85.1 (29.5) | 90.0 (32.2) | 91.6 (33.1) | 91.0 (32.8) | 88.5 (31.4) | 81.1 (27.3) | 71.8 (22.1) | 65.1 (18.4) | 78.6 (25.9) |
| Daily mean °F (°C) | 53.2 (11.8) | 56.8 (13.8) | 62.3 (16.8) | 68.3 (20.2) | 76.0 (24.4) | 81.7 (27.6) | 83.5 (28.6) | 83.0 (28.3) | 80.0 (26.7) | 71.3 (21.8) | 61.4 (16.3) | 55.5 (13.1) | 69.4 (20.8) |
| Mean daily minimum °F (°C) | 43.7 (6.5) | 47.2 (8.4) | 52.7 (11.5) | 59.0 (15.0) | 66.9 (19.4) | 73.5 (23.1) | 75.3 (24.1) | 75.0 (23.9) | 71.5 (21.9) | 61.6 (16.4) | 51.0 (10.6) | 45.9 (7.7) | 60.3 (15.7) |
| Mean minimum °F (°C) | 25.7 (−3.5) | 30.2 (−1.0) | 35.1 (1.7) | 44.0 (6.7) | 54.1 (12.3) | 66.7 (19.3) | 70.4 (21.3) | 69.2 (20.7) | 60.3 (15.7) | 44.6 (7.0) | 34.1 (1.2) | 30.5 (−0.8) | 24.1 (−4.4) |
| Record low °F (°C) | 5 (−15) | 7 (−14) | 22 (−6) | 33 (1) | 44 (7) | 55 (13) | 61 (16) | 60 (16) | 43 (6) | 32 (0) | 22 (−6) | 11 (−12) | 5 (−15) |
| Average precipitation inches (mm) | 5.03 (128) | 4.77 (121) | 5.25 (133) | 5.52 (140) | 3.90 (99) | 7.32 (186) | 7.89 (200) | 7.50 (191) | 6.61 (168) | 4.70 (119) | 4.42 (112) | 5.40 (137) | 68.31 (1,735) |
| Average precipitation days (≥ 0.01 in) | 9.6 | 8.6 | 8.1 | 7.1 | 7.6 | 12.0 | 15.3 | 14.7 | 9.3 | 6.4 | 7.1 | 9.5 | 115.3 |
Source: NOAA

=== Hurricanes ===
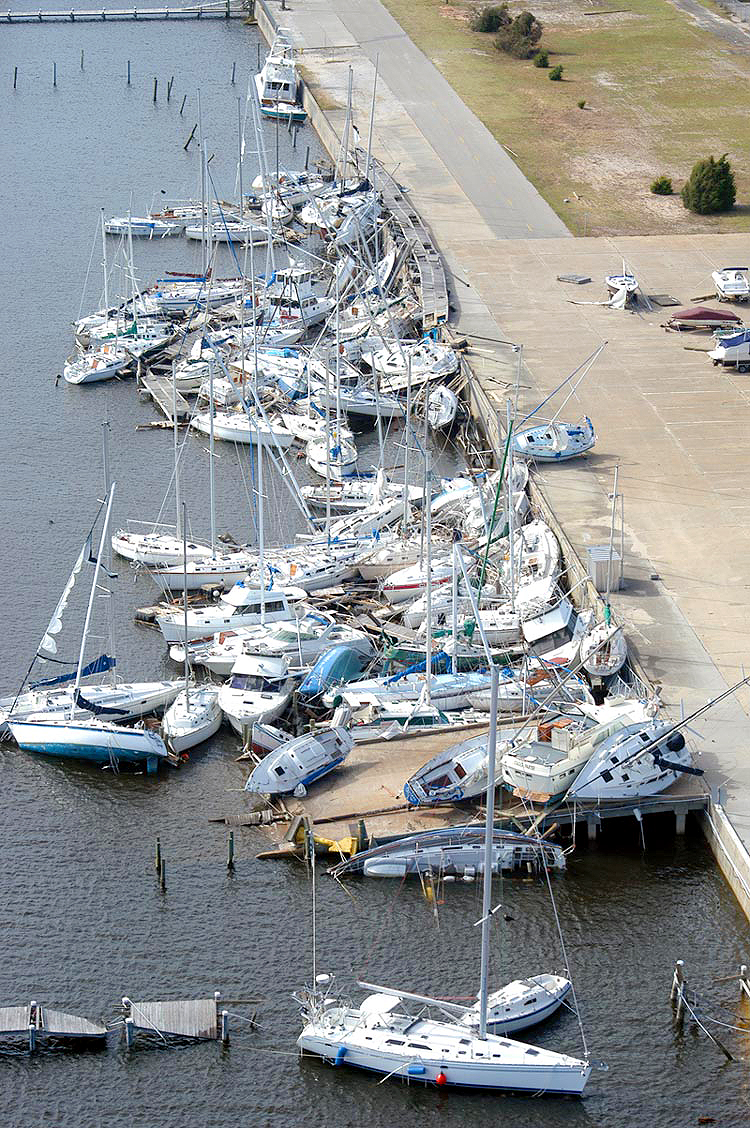
Damage from Hurricane Ivan at bayou near Naval Air Station, 2004

Pensacola's location on the Florida Panhandle makes it vulnerable to hurricanes. Hurricanes which have made landfall at or near Pensacola since the late 20th century include Eloise (1975), Frederic (1979), Juan (1985), Erin (1995), Opal (1995), Georges (1998), Ivan (2004), Dennis (2005), Sally (2020), and Isaias (2026). In July 2005, Hurricane Dennis made landfall just east of the city, sparing it the damage received from Ivan the year before. However, hurricane and near-hurricane-force winds were recorded in downtown, causing moderate damage.

Pensacola received only a glancing blow from Hurricane Katrina in 2005, resulting in light to moderate damage reported in the area. The aftermath of the extensive damage from Katrina was a dramatic reduction in tourism coming from Louisiana, Mississippi, and Alabama.

==== Hurricane Ivan ====
On September 16, 2004, Pensacola and several surrounding areas were devastated by Hurricane Ivan. Pensacola was on the eastern side of the eyewall, which sent a large storm surge into Escambia Bay; this destroyed most of the I-10 Escambia Bay Bridge. The storm knocked 58 spans off the eastbound and westbound bridges and misaligned another 66 spans, forcing the bridge to close to traffic in both directions. The surge also destroyed the fishing bridge that spanned Pensacola Bay alongside the Phillip Beale Memorial Bridge, locally known as the Three Mile Bridge.

Over $6 billion in damage occurred in the metro area and more than 10,000 homes were destroyed, with another 27,000 heavily damaged. 105,000 households in Northwest Florida were impacted in some way by the storm, and 4,300 businesses in the area permanently closed as a result of Hurricane Ivan. NASA created a comparison image to illustrate the massive damage. This widespread destruction of property caused a temporary lack of affordable housing in the Pensacola real estate market, and Hurricane Dennis and Hurricane Katrina contributed to a general scarcity of construction labor and resources along the Gulf Coast.

==== Hurricane Sally ====
In September 2020, Pensacola suffered heavy damage from Hurricane Sally. Damages in Escambia County were estimated by local officials at $29 million. Downtown Pensacola was flooded.

== Demographics ==
Historical population
| Census | Pop. | Note | %± |
|---|---|---|---|
| 1850 | 2,164 | | — |
| 1860 | 2,876 | | 32.9% |
| 1870 | 3,347 | | 16.4% |
| 1880 | 6,845 | | 104.5% |
| 1890 | 11,750 | | 71.7% |
| 1900 | 17,747 | | 51.0% |
| 1910 | 22,982 | | 29.5% |
| 1920 | 31,035 | | 35.0% |
| 1930 | 31,579 | | 1.8% |
| 1940 | 37,449 | | 18.6% |
| 1950 | 43,479 | | 16.1% |
| 1960 | 56,752 | | 30.5% |
| 1970 | 59,507 | | 4.9% |
| 1980 | 57,619 | | −3.2% |
| 1990 | 58,165 | | 0.9% |
| 2000 | 56,255 | | −3.3% |
| 2010 | 51,923 | | −7.7% |
| 2020 | 54,312 | | 4.6% |
| 2023 (est.) | 53,724 | ▼ | −1.1% |
U.S. Decennial Census; 2020 Census

As of the 2023 American Community Survey, there are 24,979 estimated households in Pensacola with an average of 2.14 persons per household. The city has a median household income of $72,699. Approximately 12.4% of the city's population lives at or below the poverty line. Pensacola has an estimated 61.6% employment rate, with 42.7% of the population holding a bachelor's degree or higher and 92.7% holding a high school diploma.

The top five reported ancestries (people were allowed to report up to two ancestries, thus the figures will generally add to more than 100%) were English (93.7%), Spanish (2.3%), Indo-European (1.9%), Asian and Pacific Islander (1.8%), and Other (0.3%).

=== Racial and ethnic composition ===
Pensacola, Florida – racial and ethnic composition Note: the US Census treats Hispanic/Latino as an ethnic category. This table excludes Latinos from the racial categories and assigns them to a separate category. Hispanics/Latinos may be of any race.
| Race / ethnicity (NH = non-Hispanic) | Pop. 2000 | Pop. 2010 | Pop. 2020 | % 2000 | % 2010 | % 2020 |
|---|---|---|---|---|---|---|
| White alone (NH) | 35,824 | 33,383 | 35,105 | 63.68% | 64.29% | 64.64% |
| Black or African American alone (NH) | 17,086 | 14,420 | 12,054 | 30.37% | 27.77% | 22.19% |
| Native American or Alaska Native alone (NH) | 282 | 269 | 194 | 0.50% | 0.52% | 0.36% |
| Asian alone (NH) | 991 | 1,024 | 1,290 | 1.76% | 1.97% | 2.38% |
| Native Hawaiian or Pacific Islander alone (NH) | 31 | 62 | 43 | 0.06% | 0.12% | 0.08% |
| Other race alone (NH) | 79 | 58 | 269 | 0.14% | 0.11% | 0.50% |
| Mixed race or multiracial (NH) | 795 | 996 | 2,519 | 1.41% | 1.92% | 4.64% |
| Hispanic or Latino (any race) | 1,167 | 1,711 | 2,838 | 2.07% | 3.30% | 5.23% |
| Total | 56,255 | 51,923 | 54,312 | 100.00% | 100.00% | 100.00% |

=== 2020 census ===
As of the 2020 census, Pensacola had a population of 54,312. The median age was 43.6 years. 17.9% of residents were under the age of 18 and 22.6% of residents were 65 years of age or older. For every 100 females there were 89.2 males, and for every 100 females age 18 and over there were 87.6 males age 18 and over.

There were 24,748 households and 13,470 families in Pensacola; 21.4% had children under the age of 18 living in them. Of all households, 35.9% were married-couple households, 21.2% were households with a male householder and no spouse or partner present, and 36.3% were households with a female householder and no spouse or partner present. About 37.4% of all households were made up of individuals and 15.8% had someone living alone who was 65 years of age or older.

There were 27,892 housing units, of which 11.3% were vacant. The homeowner vacancy rate was 2.4% and the rental vacancy rate was 11.6%.

100.0% of residents lived in urban areas, while 0.0% lived in rural areas.

Racial composition as of the 2020 census
| Race | Number | Percent |
|---|---|---|
| White | 35,935 | 66.2% |
| Black or African American | 12,169 | 22.4% |
| American Indian and Alaska Native | 233 | 0.4% |
| Asian | 1,343 | 2.5% |
| Native Hawaiian and Other Pacific Islander | 49 | 0.1% |
| Some other race | 756 | 1.4% |
| Two or more races | 3,827 | 7.0% |

=== 2010 census ===
As of the 2010 census, there were 51,923 people, 23,592 households and families residing in the city. The population density was 2,303.5 inhabitants per square mile (889.4/km^{2}). There were 26,848 housing units at an average density of 1,191.1 per square mile (459.9/km^{2}). The racial makeup of the city was 66.34% White, 27.98% African American, 0.56% Native American, 2.00% Asian, 0.12% Pacific Islander, 0.70% from some other races and 2.30% from two or more races. Hispanic or Latino people of any race were 3.30% of the population.

=== 2000 census ===
As of the 2000 census, there are 56,255 people, 24,524 households, and 14,665 families residing in the city. The population density was 2,478.7 inhabitants per square mile (957.0/km^{2}). There are 26,995 housing units at an average density of 1,189.4 per square mile (459.2/km^{2}). The racial makeup of the city was 64.91% White, 30.58% African American, 0.52% Native American, 1.77% Asian, 0.06% Pacific Islander, 0.54% from some other races and 1.61% from two or more races. Hispanic or Latino people of any race were 2.07% of the population.

There were 24,524 households out of which 24.6% have children under the age of 18 living with them, 39.7% are married couples living together, 16.7% have a female householder with no husband present, and 40.2% are non-families. 32.9% of all households are made up of individuals and 11.7% have someone living alone who is 65 years of age or older. The average household size is 2.27 and the average family size is 2.92.

In the city the age distribution was 22.9% under the age of 18, 8.9% from 18 to 24, 26.9% from 25 to 44, 24.0% from 45 to 64, and 17.2% who were 65 years of age or older. The median age was 39 years. For every 100 females there were 88.5 males. For every 100 females age 18 and over, there were 84.7 males.

The median income for a household in the city was $34,779, and the median income for a family was $42,868. Males had a median income of $32,258 versus $23,582 for females. The per capita income for the city was $21,438. 16.1% of the population and 12.7% of families were below the poverty line. Out of the total people living in poverty, 26.2% were under the age of 18 and 9.2% were 65 or older.

=== 19th century ===
==== 1860 census ====
Pensacola was Florida's largest city in 1860, with a population of 2,876.

==== 1850 census ====
After Florida joined the Union in 1845, Pensacola first appeared in the 1850 United States census, with a total population of 2,164.

==== Territorial censuses ====
After Florida became an American territory in 1821, The 1830 United States census showed 3,386 persons living in Escambia County, which increased by 18 percent to 3,993 in the 1840 census.

== Economy ==
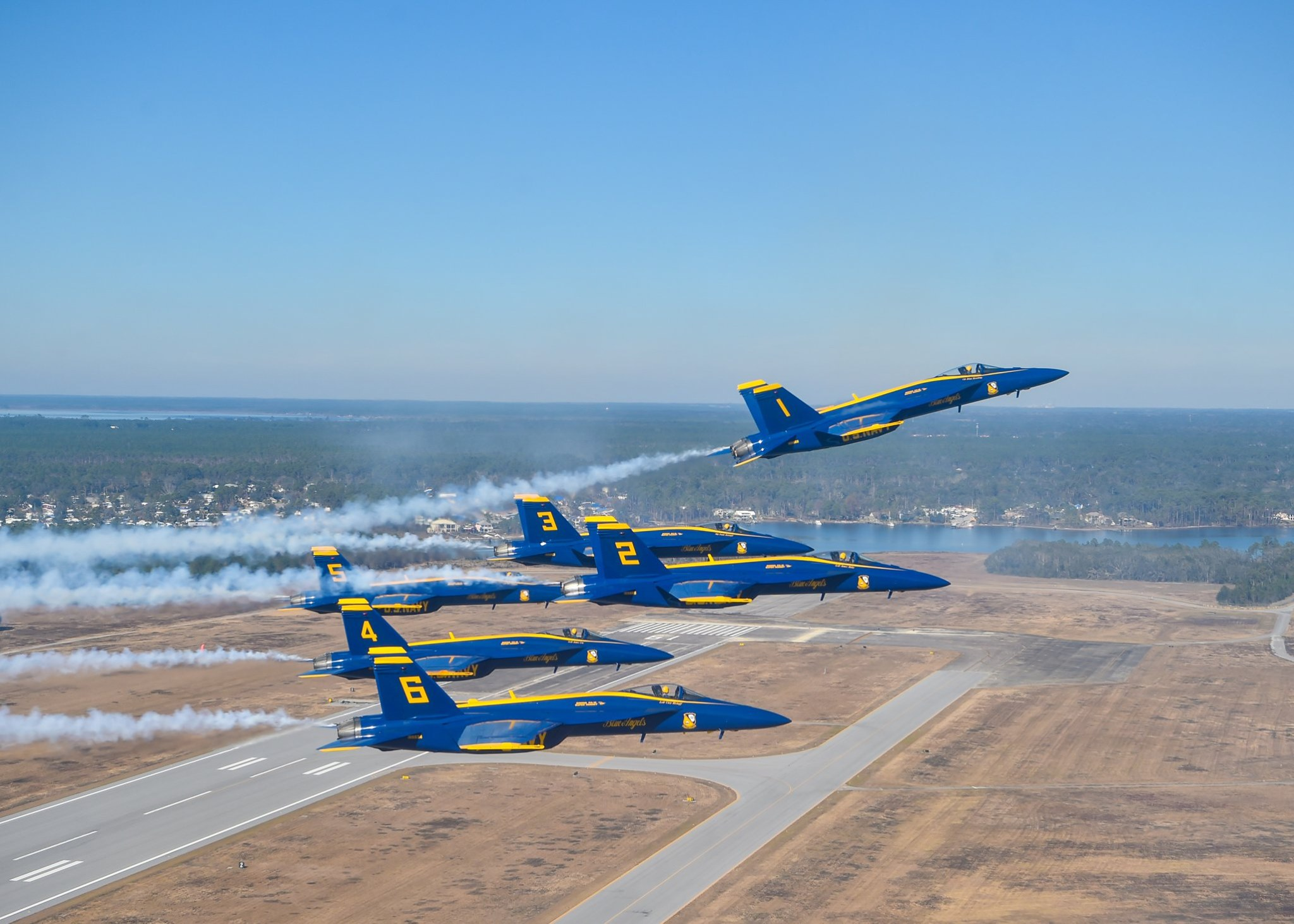
Blue Angels over Naval Air Station Pensacola

=== Military ===
The city has been referred to as "the Cradle of Naval Aviation". Naval Air Station Pensacola (NASP) was the first naval air station commissioned by the U.S. Navy in 1914. Tens of thousands naval aviators have received their training there, including John H. Glenn, USMC, who became the first American to orbit the Earth in 1962, and Neil Armstrong, who became the first man to set foot on the Moon in 1969. The Navy's Flight Demonstration Squadron, the Blue Angels, is stationed there.

The National Museum of Naval Aviation is located on NASP and is free to the public. The museum cares for and exhibits hundreds of vintage naval-aviation aircraft and preserves the history of naval aviation through displays, symposiums, IMAX movies, and tours.

Information Warfare Training Command Corry Station serves as an annex for the main base and the Center for Information Warfare Training Command. CWO3 Gary R. Schuetz Memorial Health Clinic is at Corry Station, Naval Hospital Pensacola, as is the main Navy Exchange and Defense Commissary Agency commissary complex for both Corry Station and NAS Pensacola. The Army National Guard B Troop 1-153 Cavalry, Bravo Company 146th Expeditionary Signal Battalion, is stationed in Pensacola.

NASP hosted the commissioning ceremony of the United States Navy's newest amphibious transport dock, the USS Richard M. McCool Jr. (LPD 29) on September 7, 2024. The ceremony featured Shana McCool, the granddaughter of Richard M. McCool Jr.; Shana served as the ship's sponsor. Notable attendees included the Secretary of the Navy and the Chief of Naval Operations. LPD 29 is the 13th ship of the San Antonio-class to be commissioned in the United States Navy and is the first vessel to be the namesake of Richard M. McCool Jr.

=== Tourism ===
Pensacola is home to a number of annual festivals, events, historic tours, and landmarks. The Pensacola Seafood Festival and the Pensacola Crawfish Festival have been held for nearly 30 years in the city's historic downtown. The Great Gulfcoast Arts Festival is held annually in November in Seville Square, and often draws more than 200 regional and international artists. The Children's Art Festival, also held in Seville Square, displays art by local schoolchildren. Pensacon is a comic convention held each February, with nearly 25,000 attendees from around the world. The Pensacola Interstate Fair is held each fall.

Scuba diving and deep-sea fishing are a large part of Pensacola's tourism industry. The USS Oriskany was purposefully sunk in 2004 to create an artificial reef off the shores of Pensacola.

Several walking tours of restored 18th-century-era neighborhoods are in Pensacola.

Pensacola is the site of the Vietnam Veterans' Wall South. The city has a number of historical military installations from the Civil War, including Fort Barrancas. Fort Pickens served as a temporary prison for Geronimo. Other military landmarks there include the National Naval Aviation Museum and Pensacola Lighthouse at NAsP.

The city's convention and visitors' bureau, Visit Pensacola, is overseen by the Greater Pensacola Chamber.

The city receives more than 2.5 million visitors annually, with a steady growth each year.

=== Top employers ===
| Rank | Employer | Employees |
|---|---|---|
| 1 | Navy Federal Credit Union | 7,723 |
| 2 | Baptist Health Care | 6,633 |
| 3 | Sacred Heart Health Systems | 4,820 |
| 4 | Florida Power And Light | 1,774 |
| 5 | West Florida Healthcare | 1,200 |
| 6 | Ascend Performance Materials | 888 |
| 7 | Alorica (fka West Corporation) | 800 |
| 8 | Innisfree Hotels | 750 |
| 9 | Santa Rosa Medical Center | 521 |
| 10 | Medical Center Clinic | 500 |

== Arts and culture ==
=== The arts and theatre ===
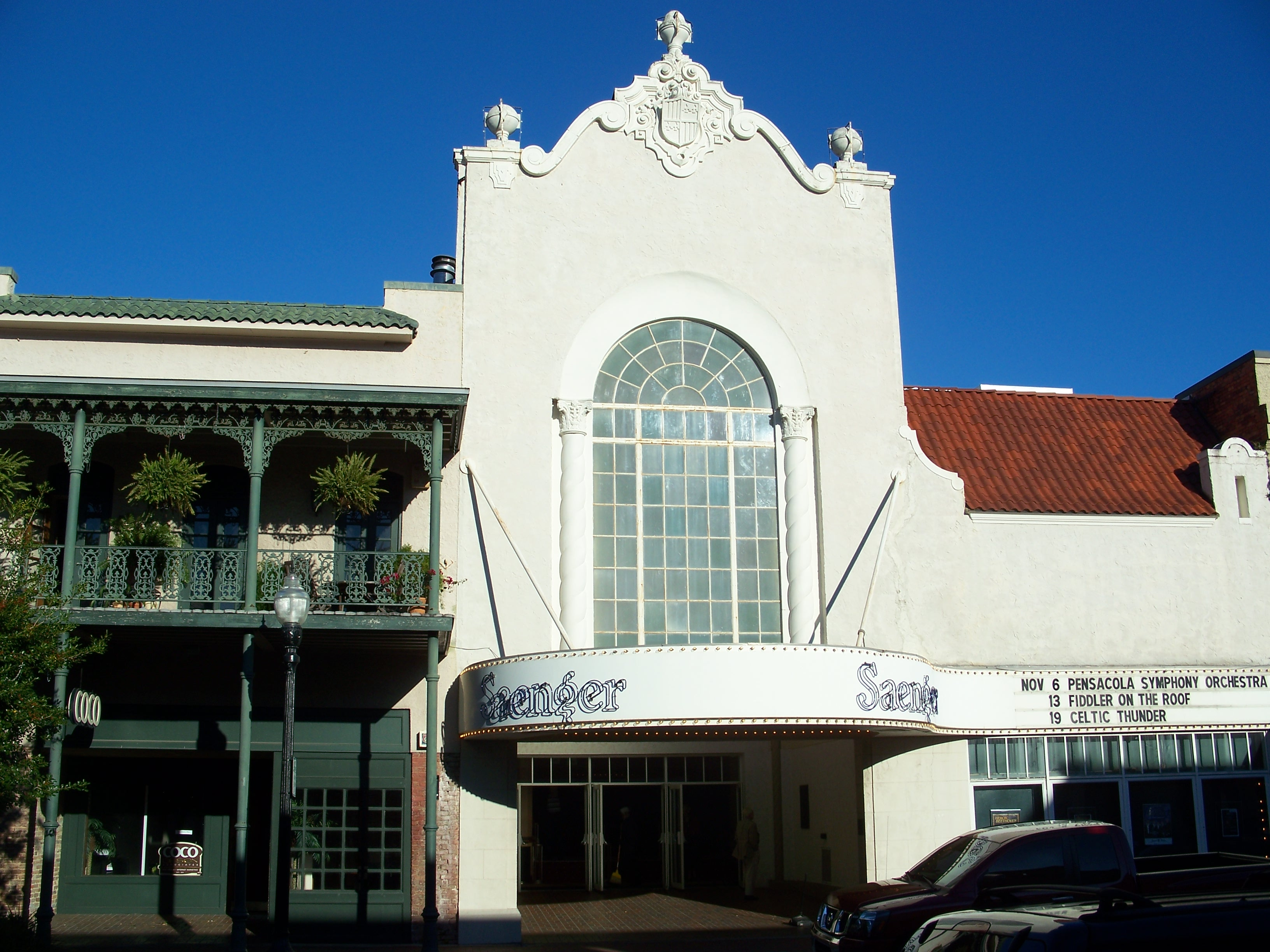
Saenger Theater in Downtown Pensacola

There are a number of performance venues in the Pensacola area, including the Pensacola Bay Center (formerly the Pensacola Civic Center), often used for big-ticket events, and the Saenger Theater, used for performances and mid-level events. Other theatres used for live performances, plays, and musicals include the Pensacola Little Theatre, Pensacola State College, University of West Florida, Vinyl Music Hall, and Loblolly Theatre. Pensacola is also home to the Pensacola Opera, Pensacola Children's Chorus, Pensacola Symphony Orchestra, Pensacola Civic Band, Pensacola Bay Concert Band, and the Choral Society of Pensacola, as well as Ballet Pensacola, as well as the Palafox Place entertainment district.

=== Architecture ===
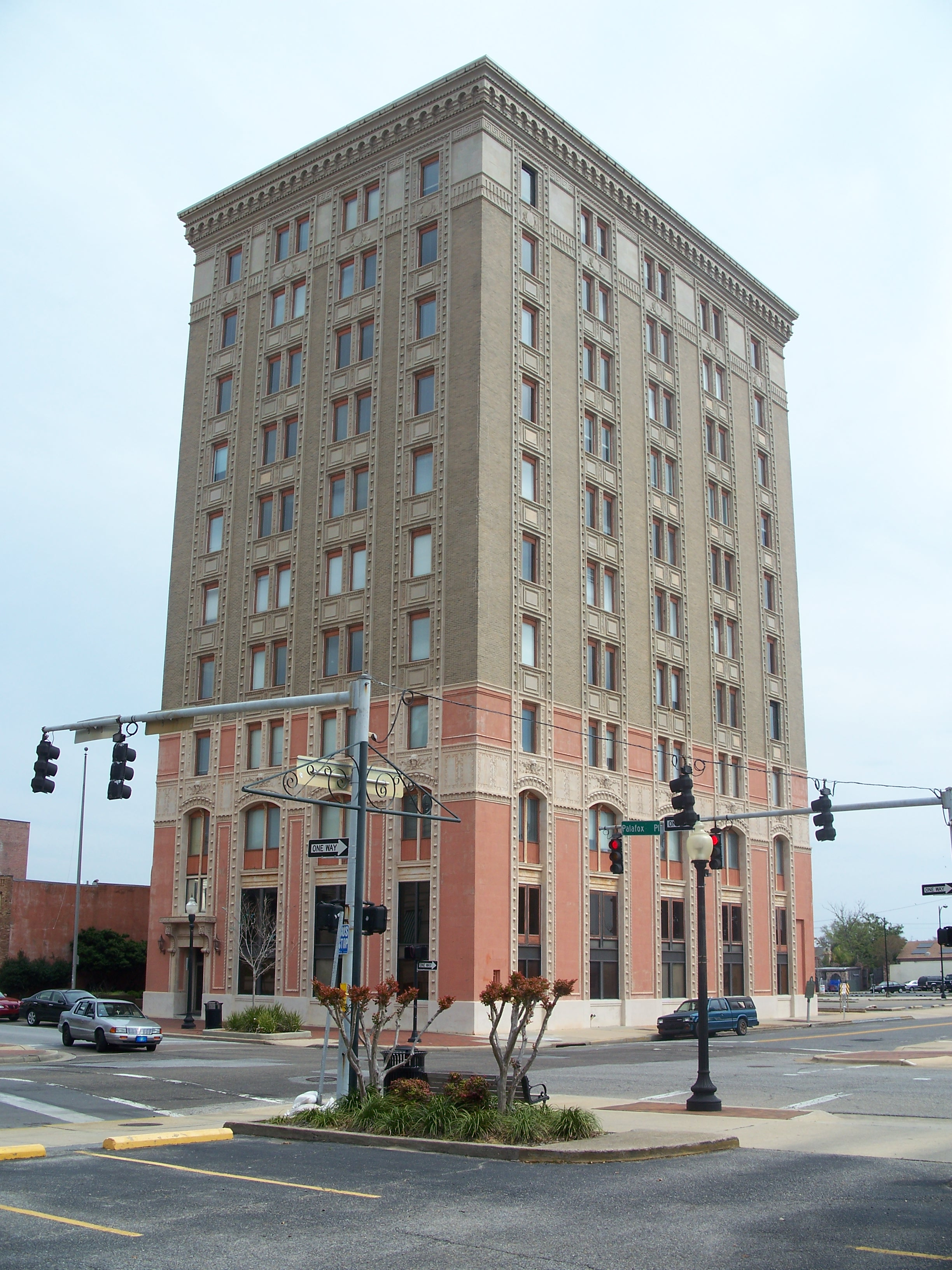
Seville Tower in Pensacola

Pensacola does not have a high rise presence, but has several medium-rise buildings. The tallest is the 15-floor Crowne Plaza Grand Hotel, at 146 feet (45 m). Other tall buildings include the Scenic Apartments (98 feet; 30 m), SunTrust Tower (96 feet; 29 m), Seville Tower (88 feet; 27 m), and the AT&T Building (76 feet; 23 m).

Historic buildings in Pensacola include the First National Bank Building.

=== Museums ===
- Historic Pensacola's Museum of Commerce
- Museum of Industry
- National Naval Aviation Museum
- Pensacola MESS Hall
- Pensacola Museum of Art

=== Pelican Drop ===
The Pelican Drop was a New Year's Eve celebration that took place each year in downtown Pensacola. At the ceremony, an aluminum pelican, the city's mascot, was dropped instead of the typical New Year's ball. The event included live music and fireworks. From 2008 to 2018, The Pelican Drop was a significant attraction in the area, drawing in crowds of up to 50,000 local residents and visitors, making it one of the largest events of its kind in the Central Time Zone. In 2014, the event was named as one of the top-20 events in the Southeast by the Southeast Tourism Society.

==== History ====
The First Pelican Drop New Year's Celebration took place in 2008. The Pensacola News Journal released an article stating that the Pensacola Community Redevelopment Agency was planning a new kind of New Year's Eve celebration, to be held at the Plaza Ferdinand VII and broadcast live on WEAR-TV; beginning with the 2017 celebration, events were carried in simulcast on WEAR's website. Almost 45,000 people showed up for the event, including residents of Mobile, Alabama (which hosts its own competing drop, a Moon Pie), Milton, Florida, Navarre, Florida, and Destin, Florida.

In December 2019, organizers announced that the Pelican Drop had been canceled due to financial issues and the burden the event had caused on local police and public services. A smaller fireworks display, which does not require the same amount of traffic disruption, would be held, instead.

The pelican was made and designed by Emmett Andrews LLC. Made of polished aluminum and decorated with over 2,000 lights, the bird had a 17-foot (5.2 m) wingspan and is 12 feet (3.7 m) high.

== Sports ==
Notable sports teams in Pensacola include:

| Team | Sport | League | Venue |
| Pensacola Ice Flyers | Ice hockey | SPHL | Pensacola Bay Center |
| Gulf Coast Riptide | American football | Women's Spring Football League | Escambia High School |
| Pensacola Blue Wahoos | Baseball | Southern League (AA) | Pensacola Bayfront Stadium |
| Pensacola Christian Eagles | Basketball, Soccer, Volleyball | NCCAA Division II South Region | Arlin R. Horton Sports Center (basketball/volleyball); Eagle Field (soccer) |
| Pensacola FC | Soccer | Gulf Coast Premier League | Ashton Brosnaham Stadium |
| West Florida Argonauts | Baseball, Basketball, XC, American Football, Golf, Soccer, Softball, Swimming, Tennis, Volleyball | NCAA Division I United Athletic Conference | Jim Spooner Field (baseball); Pen Air Field (football); UWF Field House (basketball/volleyball); UWF Soccer Complex (soccer); UWF Softball Complex (softball) |
| West Florida Roller Derby | Flat Track Roller Derby | Women's Flat Track Derby Association | Weber's Skate World |

Previously, the Pensacola Pelicans was an independent league baseball team that played at Jim Spooner Field from 2002 to 2010.

The city hosted professional golf tournaments such as the Pensacola Open (PGA Tour, 1958–1988), the Pensacola Ladies Invitational (LPGA Tour, 1965–1968) and Pensacola Classic (Nike Tour, 1990–1995).

America's Cup team American Magic call Pensacola their home port until the 2024 America's Cup commences.

The Five Flags Speedway is a half-mile paved racetrack that opened in 1953. It hosts the Snowball Derby stock car race every December since 1968. It has also hosted rounds of the NASCAR Grand National (now NASCAR Cup Series), Superstar Racing Experience, NASCAR Southeast Series, ARCA Racing Series, ARCA Menards Series East, ASA National Tour, CARS Pro Cup Series and Southern Super Series.

== Parks and recreation ==
- Gulf Islands National Seashore
- Big Lagoon State Park - approximately 10 miles (16 km) southwest of Pensacola on Gulf Beach Highway
- Perdido Key State Park - located on a barrier island 15 miles (24 km) southwest of Pensacola, off S.R. 292
- Tarkiln Bayou Preserve State Park - 10 miles (16 km) southwest of Pensacola,
- Pensacola Bayfront Stadium - a multi-use park in Pensacola
- Plaza Ferdinand VII
- Bayview Park
- Miraflores Park

== Government ==
Council Members
| District | Council member |
| 1 | Jennifer Brahier |
| 2 | Charles Bare |
| 3 | Casey Jones |
| 4 | Jared Moore |
| 5 | Teniade Broughton |
| 6 | Allison Patton |
| 7 | Delarian Wiggins |

Pensacola utilizes a strong mayor-council form of government, which was adopted in 2011 after citizens voted in 2009 to approve a new city charter. An elected mayor serves as the chief executive of the city government, while a seven-member city council serves as the city's governing body. A council president is selected by the council from its members, along with a vice president.

City voters approved a charter amendment on June 11, 2013, which eliminated the then-nine member council's two at-large seats; one seat was phased out in November 2014, and the other expired in November 2016. Two additional charter amendments were approved on November 4, 2014, which made the position of mayor subject to recall and provided the city council with the authority to hire staff. The current city hall was opened in 1986.

=== Politics ===
After the Civil War, Pensacola, like the rest of the South, was controlled by Republicans during the Reconstruction era (1865-1877). The Republican government had numerous African American politicians, including several county commissioners, city aldermen, constables, state representatives, and even one African American mayor—Salvador Pons. However, with the 1884 election of native Pensacolian and former Confederate general Edward Perry, a dramatic shift occurred. Perry, a Democrat who actually lost the Escambia County vote during the statewide election, acted to dissolve the Republican city government of Pensacola and in 1885 replaced this government with hand-picked successors, including railroad magnate William D. Chipley. The only African American to remain in city government was George Washington Witherspoon, a pastor with the African Methodist Episcopal Church who was previously a Republican and switched parties to the Democrats. Following Governor Perry's dissolution of the Republican government, the city remained Democratic for more than a century after the Civil War with no African Americans serving in an elected capacity for nearly a century.

Presidential election results in Pensacola
| Year | Democratic | Republican | Others |
|---|---|---|---|
| 2024 | 50.2% 16,515 | 48.0% 15,798 | 1.7% 575 |
| 2020 | 51.5% 18,181 | 46.4% 16,356 | 2.1% 751 |
| 2016 | 46.7% 15,183 | 47.3% 15,386 | 6.1% 1,974 |

This changed in 1994, when Republican attorney Joe Scarborough defeated Vince Whibbs Jr., the son of popular former Democratic mayor Vince Whibbs, in a landslide to represent Florida's 1st congressional district, which is based in Pensacola. Republicans also swept all of the area's seats in the state legislature, the majority of which were held by Democrats. Since then, Republicans have dominated every level of government, although municipal elections are officially nonpartisan.

=== Regional representatives ===
Pensacola is represented in the United States House of Representatives by Jimmy Patronis (R), who won the seat in a special election following the resignation of Matt Gaetz (R) in November 2024. It is represented in the state senate by Doug Broxson (R) and in the state house by District 2 representative Alex Andrade (R).

== Education ==
The main campus of Pensacola State College is in Pensacola. The University of West Florida (UWF) operates a campus in downtown Pensacola. Its main campus, located north of the city, has the largest library in the region, the John C. Pace Library. UWF is the largest post-secondary institution in the area. Brent lane is home to the college grounds of Pensacola Christian College, a 149-acre campus.

Public primary and secondary schools in Pensacola are administered by the Escambia County School District. The district operates two high schools (Booker T. Washington and Pensacola) within Pensacola. District-run high schools near the city include Escambia, J. M. Tate, and Pine Forest. Other public schools in the city include A.K. Suter Elementary, Cordova Park Elementary, J.H. Workman Middle, N.B. Cook Elementary, O.J. Semmes Elementary, and Scenic Heights Elementary. The district also operates one magnet high school (West Florida High School of Advanced Technology) near the city.

Several private schools operate within or near the city: East Hill Academy, East Hill Christian School, Episcopal Day School of Christ Church, Pensacola Catholic High School, Pensacola Christian Academy, Sacred Heart Cathedral School, Saint John the Evangelist Catholic School, Saint Paul Catholic School, Little Flower Catholic School, and Seville Bayside Montessori. The campus of Pensacola Christian College is near the city.

== Media ==
The largest daily newspaper in the area is the Pensacola News Journal, with offices on Romana Street in downtown; the News Journal is owned by the Gannett Company. There is an alternative weekly newspaper, Inweekly.

Pensacola is home to WEAR-TV, which is a dual affiliate of ABC and NBC for Pensacola, Navarre, Fort Walton Beach, and Mobile, Alabama, and WSRE-TV, an educational independent station, which is operated by Pensacola State College. Other television stations in the market include WALA-TV, the Fox affiliate; WKRG, the CBS affiliate; WPMI, a Roar affiliate; and PBS member station WEIQ, which are all located in Mobile. Cable service in the city is provided by Cox Communications and AT&T U-Verse. WUWF is the area's NPR member station and is based at the University of West Florida. WPCS (FM) is broadcast from the Pensacola Christian College campus, where the nationwide Rejoice Radio Network maintains its studio.

Pensacola Magazine, the city's monthly glossy magazine, and Northwest Florida's Business Climate, the only business magazine devoted to the region, are published locally. The News Journal also publishes Home & Garden Weekly magazine as well as the monthly Bella, devoted to women.

== Infrastructure ==
=== Transportation ===
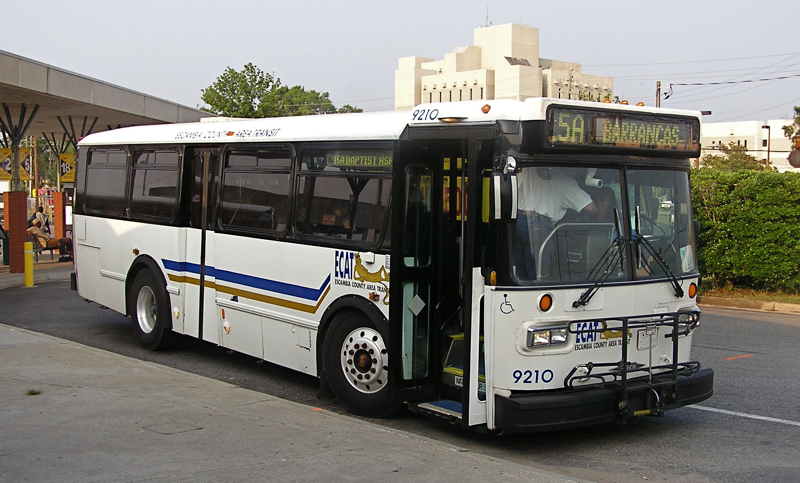
ECAT bus, June 2006

==== Aviation ====
Major air traffic in the Pensacola and greater northwest Florida area is handled by Pensacola International Airport. Pensacola International is the largest airport in Northwest Florida by passenger count and is the second busiest in all of North Florida, just behind Jacksonville. As of August 2023, airlines serving Pensacola International Airport are American Airlines, Delta Air Lines, Frontier Airlines, Southwest Airlines, Contour Airlines, and United Airlines.

==== Railroads ====
Pensacola was first connected by rail with Montgomery, Alabama, via the Alabama and Florida Railroad, completed in 1861 just before the start of the Civil War. During the war, most of the rails between Pensacola and the Alabama state line were removed to construct other railroad lines urgently needed elsewhere in the Confederacy. The line to Pensacola was not rebuilt until 1868, and was acquired by the Louisville and Nashville Railroad in 1880. In 1882, the Pensacola and Atlantic Railroad was completed from Pensacola to Chattahoochee, Florida, linking Pensacola with the rest of the state. This line was also acquired by the L&N.

By 1928, a number of short lines built northward from Pensacola to Kimbrough, Alabama, were acquired by the Frisco Railroad, giving it access to the port of Pensacola. Some thirty years later, retired Frisco steam engine 1355 was donated to the city and stands in the median of Garden Street, near the site of the now-demolished Frisco passenger station.

Frisco passenger service to Pensacola ended in 1955, and L&N passenger service, including the streamlined Gulf Wind, ended in 1971 with the advent of Amtrak. However, from early 1993 through August 2005 Pensacola was served by the tri-weekly Amtrak Sunset Limited, but service east of New Orleans to Jacksonville and Orlando was suspended due to damage to the rail line of CSX during Hurricane Katrina in 2005.

In the 21st century, freight service to and from Pensacola is provided by L&N successor CSX as well as Frisco successor Alabama and Gulf Coast Railway, a short line. On June 1, 2019, the newly formed Florida Gulf & Atlantic Railroad, a Class III railroad headquartered in Tallahassee, acquired the CSX main line from Pensacola to Baldwin, Florida, near Jacksonville, becoming the Panhandle's only east–west freight hauler. A news report on the new railroad in mid-2019 noted that Amtrak inicated that the Panhandle had a "near-zero chance" of seeing passenger service restored. Pensacola and Tallahassee are the two largest metropolitan areas in Florida without any passenger rail service.

==== Major highways ====
- I-10
- I-110
- US 29
- US 90 & US 90 Alternate
- US 98 & US 98 Business
- State Road 289 9th Avenue
- State Road 291 Davis Highway
- State Road 292 Pace Boulevard
- State Road 295 New Warrington Road, Farfield Drive
- State Road 296 Michigan Avenue, Beverly Parkway, Brent Lane, Bayou Boulevard, Perry Street
- State Road 742 Creighton Road, Burgess Road
- State Road 750 Airport Boulevard

==== Mass transit ====
The local bus service is the Escambia County Area Transit. ECAT operates fixed route bus service and paratransit service. The ECAT system currently provides fixed-route bus service, as well as the seasonal Pensacola Beach trolley and University of West Florida on-campus trolley. There is a website and an app for bus times called moovit. The app can be downloaded from this site, which also shows the service area and lists the routes.

Pensacola also has a ferry service owned by the National Park Service. It has stops in Downtown Pensacola, Pensacola Beach and Fort Pickens.

==== Intercity bus ====
The city is served by Greyhound Bus and Greyhound Lines.

=== Hospitals ===
Hospitals in Pensacola include Ascension Sacred Heart Hospital, Baptist Hospital, Encompass Health Rehabilitation Hospital, HCA Florida West Hospital, and Select Specialty Hospital.

== Bands from Pensacola ==
- Finite Automata, an industrial band
- This Bike is a Pipe Bomb, a folk-punk band
- Twothirtyeight, indie rock band
- Body Head Bangerz, hip hop group
- McAlyster, country music group

== Sister cities ==
Pensacola's sister cities are:

- Chimbote, Peru
- Escazú, Costa Rica
- Gero, Japan
- Isla Mujeres, Mexico
- Horlivka, Ukraine
- Miraflores, Peru
- Kaohsiung, Taiwan
- Macharaviaya, Spain

== See also ==
- Blue Angels
- Brownsville Revival
- Escambia Bay Bridge
- Escambia High School riots
- Gulf Breeze, Florida
- Marion C. Bascom
- Murders of Byrd and Melanie Billings (July 9, 2009)
- Navarre, Florida
- USS Pensacola, 4 ships
