= Pensacola Pelicans =

- Logo

Information
- League: American Association (2006–10) (South Division)
- Location: Pensacola, Florida
- Ballpark: Jim Spooner Field at Pelican Park
- Founded: 2002
- Folded: 2011
- League championships: 1 (2002)
- Former name: Pensacola Pelicans (2002–10)
- Former leagues: Southeastern League (2002–03); Central Baseball League (2004–05)
- Former ballparks: PJC Park (2002); Pelican Park (2003–08)
- Colors: Teal, navy, yellow, white
- Ownership: Quint & Rishy Studer
- General manager: Talmadge "T" Nunnari
- Media: Pensacola NewsJournal
- Website: www.pensacolapelicans.com

The Pensacola Pelicans were a minor league baseball team based in Pensacola, Florida. In various incarnations, they played in three different independent baseball leagues (leagues unaffiliated with Major League Baseball) from 2002 to 2010. They played their games at Pelican Park.

The initial incarnation of the Pelicans began play in 2002 as charter members of the new, independent Southeastern League. The league folded after the 2003 season, and team owner Quint Studer purchased a franchise in the Central Baseball League, moving the Pelicans to the new organization. When the CBL folded in 2004 the Pelicans joined the new American Association of Independent Professional Baseball. They won the Southeastern League championship in 2002.

In 2010 Studer sold his American Association franchise to a group in Amarillo, Texas as part of a move to bring Class Double-A affiliated baseball to Pensacola. The franchise became the Amarillo Sox for the 2011 season; the new team, the Pensacola Blue Wahoos, began play in 2012.

== History ==
=== Independent leagues ===
The Pensacola Pelicans were incorporated in 2002, when the Southeastern League decided to place a team in the Pensacola area. Midway through the 2002 season, Quint Studer and his wife Rishy Studer bought the team from the league and were approved under Commissioner James Gamble. The 2002 season was a very successful one for the Pelicans; they had the league's best record and won the championship in an extra-innings victory against the Montgomery Wings. The 2003 season was also successful, with the Pelicans once again claiming the league's best record but losing to the Baton Rouge Riverbats in the championship series.

Before the 2004 season, the affiliated Orlando Rays of the Southern League moved to Montgomery, Alabama, the location of a key Southeastern League franchise. Unable to compete with an affiliated baseball club in one of its cities, the Southeastern League folded, and the Pelicans were left without a league in which to play.

In order to join the Central Baseball League for the 2004 season, Pelicans owner Studer purchased the rights to the Springfield Ozark Mountain Ducks franchise, and the Pelicans took that team's spot in the league. Former major league standout Bernie Carbo was the team's manager and former major leaguer Pedro Borbon aided him as pitching coach.

The CBL folded in 2005 and the Pelicans joined the American Association of Independent Professional Baseball after the 2005 season, and named Kash Beauchamp as manager. After leading the Pelicans to a 39–57 season, Beauchamp was released from his managerial duties. The Pelicans were led by Mac Seibert in 2007 and 2008, finishing 39–56 in '07 and 43–53 in '08. Seibert left after his second year to work in the New York Mets organization. The Pelicans won the South Division in 2009, making the championship round before losing to the Lincoln Saltdogs in 5 games.

=== Southern League ===
In 2010 Studer orchestrated a complicated series of purchases and moves to bring affiliated Class Double-A baseball to Pensacola. First, he sold his American Association franchise to a group in Amarillo, Texas, where they became the Amarillo Sox, now known as the Amarillo Thunderheads. Then, he purchased the Carolina Mudcats, a Southern League team from Zebulon, North Carolina. To settle the deal, however, he had to facilitate the move of the Kinston Indians to Zebulon, where they took up the Mudcats name. Additionally, as Pensacola is within the franchise territory of the Mobile BayBears, he had to compensate that team. The arrangements cost Studer a total of $2 million.

It was initially reported that Studer's team would take up the Pelicans name, but it was later announced a new name would be chosen by fan contest. Per said contest, the team was named the Pensacola Blue Wahoos; they began play in the Southern League in 2012.
