= First National Bank Building (Pensacola, Florida) =

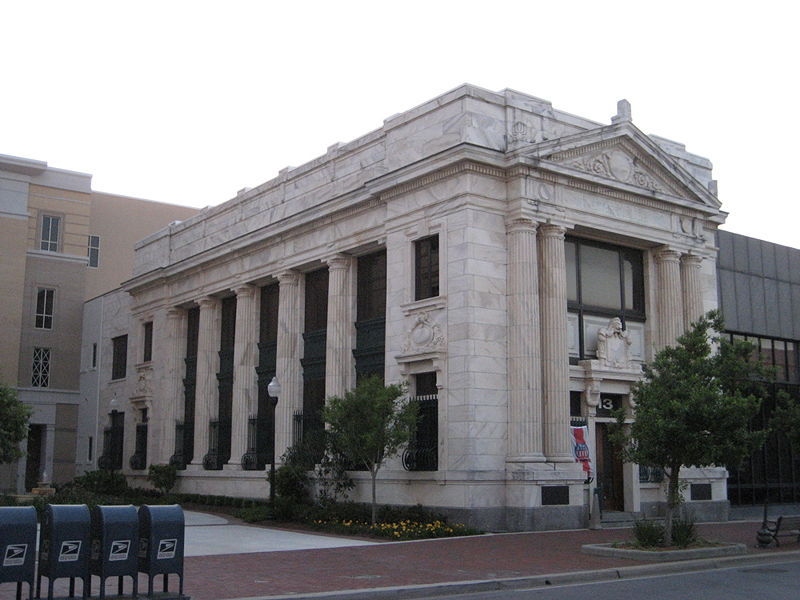
- First National Bank Building
- Interactive map of the First National Bank Building area

General information
- Architectural style: Classical Revival
- Location: 213 S. Palafox St., Pensacola, Florida, United States
- Coordinates: 30.40983°N 87.21489°W
- Construction started: 1906
- Completed: 1908
- Cost: $
- Client: First National Bank

Technical details
- Structural system: foundation: polished Maine granite; structure: white Georgia marble
- Size: 2 stories

Design and construction
- Architects: Mowbray and Uffinger, New York
- Engineer: Builder: Charlie Hunter

The First National Bank Building, also known as the Citizens and Peoples National Bank Building, is an historic two-story Classical Revival style building located at 213 South Palafox Street in Pensacola, Escambia County, Florida. Built in 1906-1908 by Charlie Hunter, it was designed by the New York architectural firm Mowbray and Uffinger. In 1989, the building was listed in A Guide to Florida's Historic Architecture, published by the University of Florida Press.

In 1993 Barnett Bank acquired Citizens and Peoples National Bank and the building. Today the building is part of the Escambia County Government Center and is owned by Escambia County, which has renamed it the Matt Langley Bell III Building in memory of Matt Langley Bell III, longtime Escambia County Tax Collector who died in office on October 15, 2008. Today the Tax Collector's main office is in the building.

== History ==
=== F. C. Brent's tenure ===
In 1892, Francis Celestino Brent purchased a controlling interest of the Sullivans' bank and merged it with his own bank, keeping the First National Bank name. As the bank's operations and assets grew, Brent planned a nine-story office tower that would house both the bank and other businesses. However, with the construction of the Brent and Blount Buildings after the Halloween Night Fire of 1905, the need for office space was greatly reduced and the tower plans were scrapped. At this time, due to the demands of his other interests, Brent retired as president of the bank, passing control to his longtime officer, William H. Knowles.

=== Failure ===
On February 1, 1914, the Liverpool-based firm Crow, Rudolf & Company, which managed much of Pensacola's timber exports and in which the First National Bank had invested nearly a half million dollars, announced it could not meet its debts. Soon thereafter a federal receiver named R. W. Goodhart was sent to audit the bank. Despite having more than $400,000 on-site in its vault, the First National Bank was ordered to close.

=== Other history ===
The First National Bank Building In 1906, Knowles arranged the construction of another building on South Palafox Street. The First National Bank Building, built in neo-Grecian style with rows of Ionic white marble columns, was completed on May 23, 1908. Knowles sold his interest in 1909, and William K. Hyer Jr. became president. Control changed hands again two years later, with Brent and Knowles coming out of retirement to become president and vice-president, respectively. A report released on December 1, 1912, stated the bank's earnings since its establishment in 1880 at $1,114,671.

== See also ==
Palafox Place
