= Palafox Place =

Palafox Place
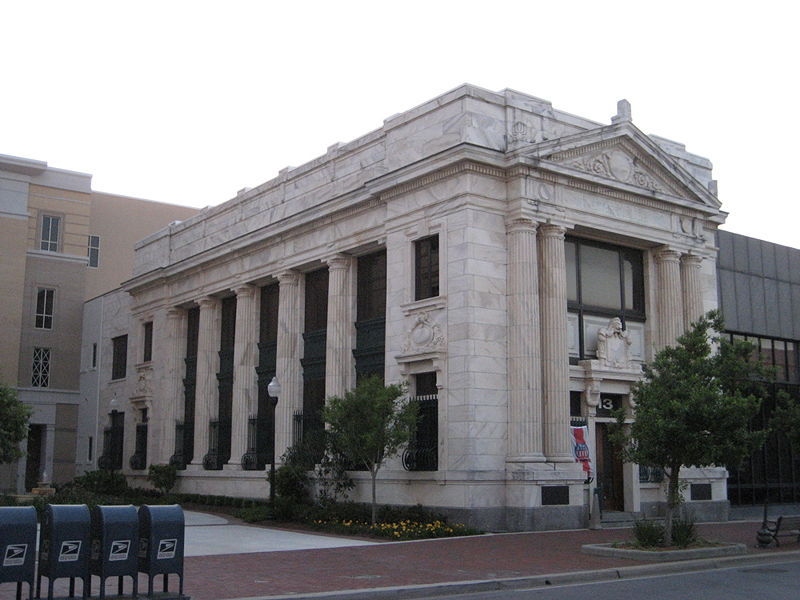
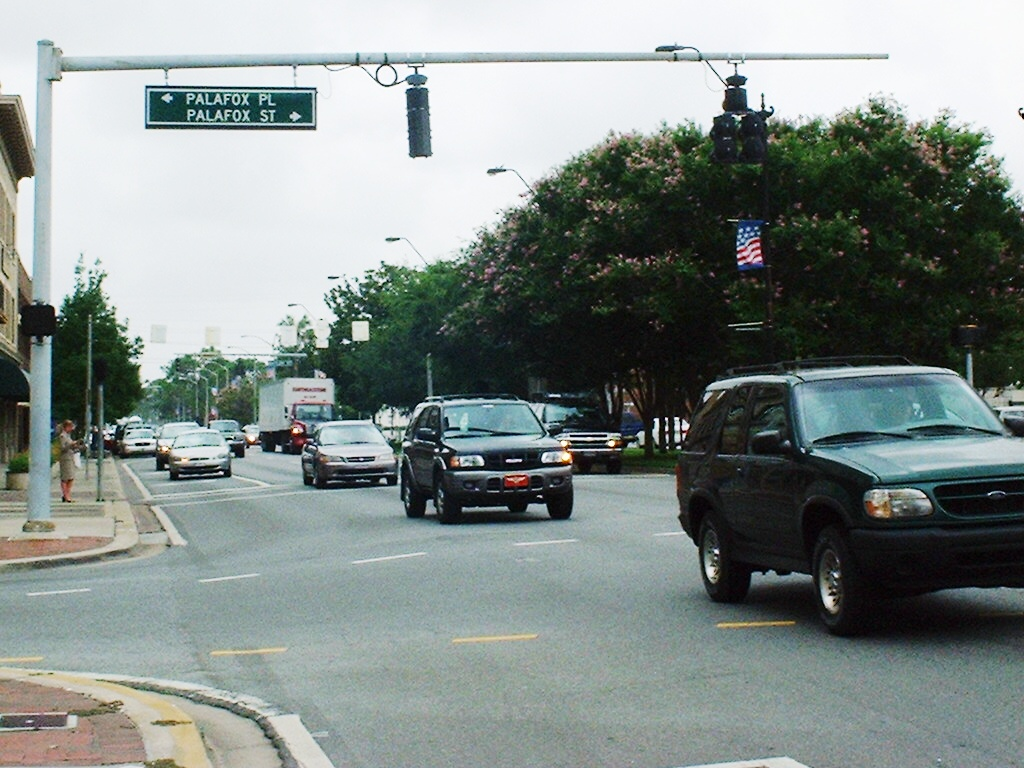

Palafox Place is a major commercial area in downtown Pensacola, Florida, United States. It comprises three blocks of South Palafox Street, south of Garden Street and north of Government Street, which was formerly the main downtown shopping district.

Palafox Place has been labeled an "entertainment district" due to the location of venues such as the Saenger Theater. Various dining places are also found there, contributing to Palafox Place's popularity as a historic center for leisure and tourist activities.

== History ==
=== 1700s ===
During British rule of the colony of West Florida (1763-1783), what is now Palafox was called Gorge Street, after a British engineer, Allies Stanforn, surveyed the city. After the re-capturing of Florida by the Spanish Empire in 1783, the street was renamed Calle de Palafox or Palafox Street. It stretched from the gardens today known as Garden Street to the waterfront where Main Street runs today. Palafox was a center of commercial activity.

=== 1800s ===
Before and after the Civil War (1861-1865), Pensacola's deepwater harbor was a port of domestic and foreign shipping for the Gulf Coast, and Palafox Street was the commercial hub for much of the Florida Panhandle. Exports included yellow pine lumber, naval stores, and fish from nearby waters, including the famous red snapper. From 1880 onward, the Louisville and Nashville Railroad, and from 1928, the Frisco Railroad, carried passengers, mail, express, and freight between Pensacola's busy docks at the foot of Palafox Street and all other points in the United States.

=== 1900s ===
By the turn of the 20th century, Palafox Street was lined with department stores, restaurants, offices and the city's first street lights. Most banks, insurance companies, and professionals such as attorneys, had offices on or near Palafox Street, in proximity to city and county offices as well as city, county, state, and federal courthouses located nearby. Office buildings, banks, hotels, restaurants, cafes, churches, grocery stores, and movie theaters, along with numerous small businesses, lined Palafox and adjacent streets from the 1920s to the 1960s, when it was the center of community and commercial life. Major national retailers located on South Palafox Street included Sears, Roebuck, J. C. Penney, Woolworth's, and a Walgreens drug store, among others.

In the mid-1950s, Town and Country Plaza, the first large, modern, open-air shopping center, was built several miles north of downtown. Thereafter, an increasing number of suburban shopping centers, and in the 1970s enclosed shopping malls, with acres of free, convenient parking, drew more and more shoppers and businesses away from the downtown area with its parking meters and traffic congestion.

=== 2000s ===
Palafox Place, a marketing term devised around the turn of the 21st century, houses restaurants, clubs, entertainment, marketing firms and more.

== New Year's Eve ==
The Pensacola Pelican Drop is the New Year's Eve Celebration that takes place in Palafox Place. The first dropping of the pelican happened December 31, 2008 as announced in the Pensacola News Journal. The Celebration is held with the dropping of a 12 foot tall, 2 1/2 ton aluminum Pelican wrapped with 2,000 lights. In 2010 the third edition was reported to be the biggest New Year's Eve Celebration in the Central Time Zone and the 2011 again grew.

== Notable landmarks ==
- Saenger Theater
- Plaza Ferdinand VII
- Plaza De Luna
- First National Bank Building
- Escambia County Election Office
- Treasury Department
- Seville Tower
- Artel Gallery
- Escambia County Property Appraiser
- Escambia County Attorney
- Art Praha European Art Gallery

== See also ==
Pensacola
Palafox
