= Mark Lee (right-handed pitcher) =

American baseball player (born 1953)

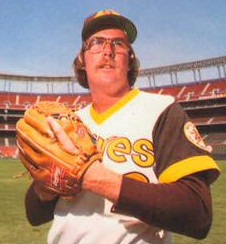
- Lee in 1978
- Pitcher
- Born: June 14, 1953 (age 73); Inglewood, California, U.S.
- Batted: Right Threw: Right

MLB debut
- April 23, 1978, for the San Diego Padres

Last MLB appearance
- October 4, 1981, for the Pittsburgh Pirates

MLB statistics
- Win–loss record: 7–8
- Earned run average: 3.64
- Strikeouts: 63
- Stats at Baseball Reference

Teams
- San Diego Padres (1978–1979); Pittsburgh Pirates (1980–1981)

Mark Linden Lee (born June 14, 1953) is an American former Major League Baseball pitcher. Lee pitched in all or part of four seasons from 1978 until 1981, the first two for the San Diego Padres and the last two for the Pittsburgh Pirates.

Lee was pitching in Triple-A for the Pirates in 1982 when he was designated for assignment. After getting two outs in the ninth inning of a game, the second on a strikeout, Lee walked off the field while removing his jersey. He then announced he planned to quit baseball; Lee said he wanted to strike out the last batter he ever faced.

He was general manager of the Amarillo Dillas and subsequently the Amarillo Sox of the American Association of Independent Professional Baseball from 2006 to 2014.

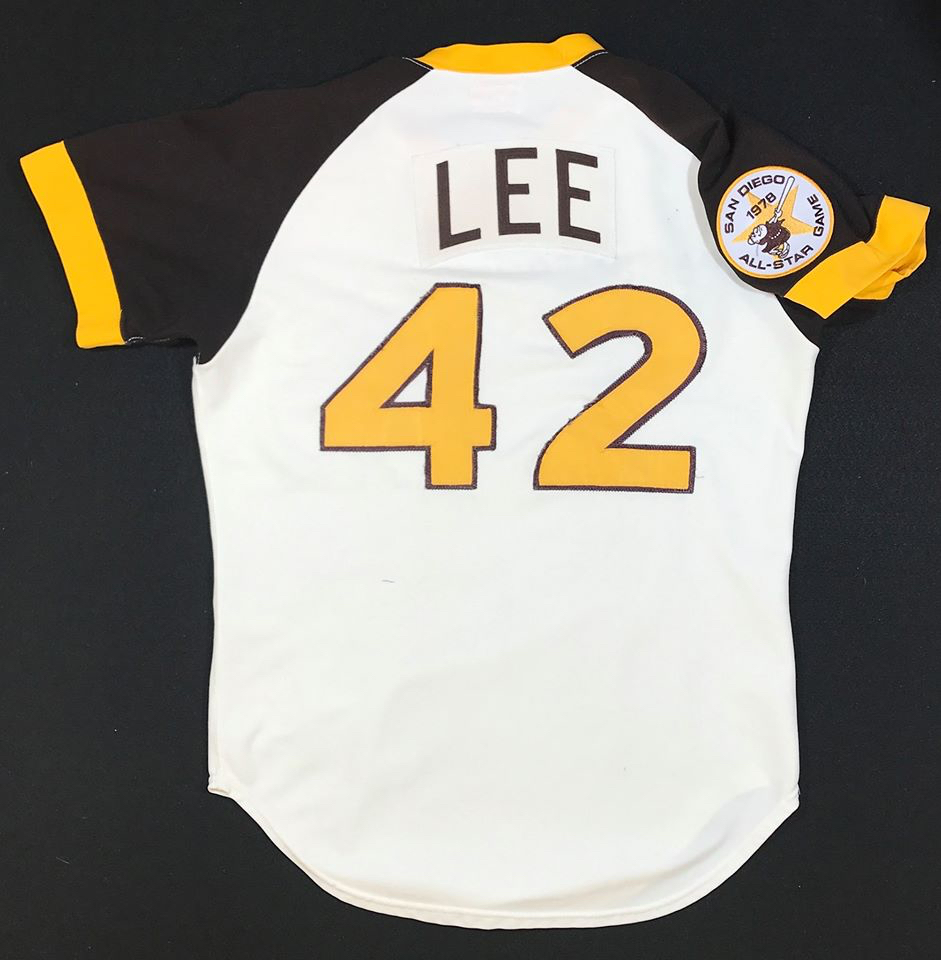
1978 San Diego Padres #42 Mark Lee Game Worn Home Jersey

== Sources ==
- Career statistics from MLB · Baseball Reference · Baseball Reference (Minors) · Retrosheet · Baseball Almanac, or Retrosheet
