= Texas AirHogs =

Independent professional baseball team based in Grand Prairie, Texas

- 2007–2020; Grand Prairie, Texas
Team logo
Cap insignia

Minor league affiliations
- Class: Independent (2007–2020)
- League: American Association (2007–2020)

Minor league titles
- League titles (1): 2011
- Division titles (3): 2008; 2011; 2013

Team data
- Name: Grand Prairie AirHogs (2007–2015); Texas AirHogs (2016–2020)
- Colors: Black, crimson red, silver, white
- Ballpark: AirHogs Stadium (2007–2020)
- Owner/ Operator: Neltex Sports (Donnie Nelson)

The Texas AirHogs were a professional baseball team based in Grand Prairie, Texas from 2008 to 2020. The AirHogs were members of the American Association of Independent Professional Baseball, which is not affiliated with Major League Baseball. Beginning in the 2008 season as the Grand Prairie AirHogs, the team played their home games at AirHogs Stadium. The team folded after the 2020 season.

The team's name was taken from a slang term used by American military pilots and referred to the city's aviation industry (Lockheed Martin Missiles and Fire Control is headquartered in Grand Prairie, and Vought Corporation once had a major plant in Dallas adjacent to Grand Prairie before the company was sold and the plant closed).

For the 2016 season, the AirHogs merged with the Amarillo Thunderheads, taking their name and splitting games between both home ballparks; from 2017 to 2020, the team was based solely in Grand Prairie.

== History ==
=== 2008 season ===
The AirHogs were managed in their inaugural season by former major leaguer Pete Incaviglia. The team played their first game on May 8 against the St. Paul Saints, losing the contest 10–3. Their first home game was a 4–2 loss to the Wichita Wingnuts on May 16. On July 25, Scot Drucker's contract was purchased by the Detroit Tigers. He was the first ever Grand Prairie player to be signed by Major League Baseball organization. On July 28, starting pitcher Kieran Mattison's contract was purchased by the Los Angeles Dodgers. He was sent to the Dodgers Double-A team, the Jacksonville Suns in the Southern League.

=== 2009 All-Star Game ===
The AirHogs played host to the 2009 American Association All-Star Game at their home field, the Ballpark in Grand Prairie, on July 21, 2009.

=== 2011 season ===
The AirHogs won their first American Association championship by winning a decisive game five in the championship series.

=== 2015–2016 ===
On November 19, 2015, American Association commissioner Miles Wolff announced that there would no longer be interleague play between the American Association and the Can-Am League (for which he was also commissioner) and that for the 2016 season the Amarillo Thunderheads and the AirHogs would operate as a joint team with 25 games in Amarillo and 25 games in Grand Prairie to make a 12-team league. On November 27, 2015 James Frisbie was named the team's manager. Following the season the team announced that they would not be returning to Amarillo and would play all games in Grand Prairie for 2017.

=== 2018–2020 ===
On May 18, 2018, the American Association announced that AirHogs have developed a partnership with the Chinese Baseball Association (CBA) and Shougang Sports for the 2018 to 2020 seasons. Thirty members of the Chinese National Baseball Team (known as the Beijing Shougang Eagles) would train at AirHogs Stadium and rotate as players on the Texas AirHogs roster. New manager John McLaren served as the manager of the China national baseball team.

Tyler Matzek pitched for the team in 2018.

On June 12, 2020, it was announced that the AirHogs were one of six teams that would not be participating in the 2020 American Association season due to the COVID-19 pandemic.

On October 23, 2020, the AirHogs terminated their membership in the American Association of Independent Professional Baseball.

== Season-by-season records ==
Season	Record	Win %	Finish	Playoffs
2008	56–40	.622	2nd	Lost in Finals to Sioux Falls Canaries
2009	48–48	.500	T–3rd	Did not qualify
2010	43–52	.453	3rd	Did not qualify
2011	64–36	.640	1st	Won Championship Series over St. Paul Saints
2012	53–47	.640	2nd	Did not qualify
2013	54–46	.540	1st	Lost 1st Round to Wichita Wingnuts
2014	40–60	.400	3rd	Did not qualify
2015	29–71	.290	5th	Did not qualify
2016	34–65	.343	4th	Did not qualify
2017	43–57	.430	3rd	Did not qualify
2018	25–75	.250	5th	Did not qualify
2019	28–71	.283	6th	Did not qualify
2020	Season cancelled due to the COVID-19 pandemic			
