= Jim Spooner Field =

Stadium in Pensacola, Florida

- UWF Baseball Complex
- Interactive map of Jim Spooner Field
- Location: 11000 University Parkway; Pensacola, Florida 32514
- Coordinates: 30.541375°N 87.207112°W
- Owner: University of West Florida
- Capacity: over 3,000 (including lawn seating)
- Surface: Bermuda Grass
- Field size: Left Field - 320 ft Left-Center - 370 ft Center Field - 390 ft Right-Center - 370 ft Right Field - 320 ft

Construction
- Groundbreaking: 1980
- Opened: 1981

Tenants
- West Florida Argonauts (NCAA) (1981–present); Pensacola Pelicans (SEL/CBL/AA) (2002–2010)

Jim Spooner Field is a stadium that is located in Pensacola, Florida, United States. It is primarily used for baseball, is the home field for the University of West Florida baseball team and was home to the Pensacola Pelicans. It opened in 1981, with a seating capacity of about 1,000 people. Over the years, that capacity has more than tripled.

In May 2003, the stadium underwent a massive renovation. The president of the Pelicans, Rishy Studer, and her husband, Quint, contributed $500,000 to improve the stadium to meet minor league standards. The renovations included adding a lawn seating area that could accommodate up to 500 people, a series of premium seating sections, a public address system, a new backstop, and accommodations for the disabled. On August 22, 2008, the Pelicans organization named it after Jim Spooner, a longtime UWF coach. The first game at Jim Spooner Field at Pelican Park was played that night.

== See also ==
- List of NCAA Division I baseball venues
