= USS Pensacola =

There have been four United States Navy ships named USS Pensacola:

- The first USS Pensacola (1859) was a steamer launched in 1859 and was decommissioned in 1911.
- The second USS Pensacola (AK-7) was a German steamer seized when the United States entered World War I and used as a transport.
- The third USS Pensacola (CA-24) was a cruiser launched in 1926 that served until the end of World War II.
- The fourth USS Pensacola (LSD-38) was a landing ship launched in 1971 and decommissioned in 1999.
