= 2013 World Baseball Classic – Qualifier 1 =

Qualifier 1 of the Qualifying Round of the 2013 World Baseball Classic was held at Roger Dean Stadium, Jupiter, Florida, United States from September 19 to 23, 2012.

Qualifier 1 was a modified double-elimination tournament. The winners for the first games matched up in the second game, while the losers faced each other in an elimination game. The winner of the elimination game then played the loser of the non-elimination game in another elimination game. The remaining two teams then played each other to determine the winner of the Qualifier 1.

Team Israel, under the Classic's rules, was entitled to have non-Israeli citizens of Jewish heritage play for the team. The players who qualified to play on the Israeli team included major leaguers catcher Ryan Lavarnway, first baseman Ike Davis, second basemen Ian Kinsler and Josh Satin, third basemen Kevin Youkilis and Danny Valencia, outfielders Ryan Braun (whose father is Israeli), Sam Fuld, Ryan Kalish, and Gabe Kapler, and pitchers Jason Marquis, Scott Feldman, Craig Breslow, and John Grabow, as well as what were then recent major leaguers catcher Brad Ausmus and pitcher Scott Schoeneweis. Kinsler said:

"Wow, I would be happy to play for Team Israel.... The truth is that if a proposal comes from Team USA to play for them, I will have a very difficult decision to make. Yuk [Kevin Youkilis], Braun [Ryan Braun], and I could make a fantastic team. I am sure that I'll talk it over with Yuk – we always laugh about things like this."

Outfielder Shawn Green, who retired in 2007, was also eligible inasmuch as he is Jewish, and said in early June 2011 that assuming it works out, it "would be an honor" and he "would love to" play for Israel in the Classic.

Because they were held in September, however, with the Major League Baseball season still in progress, Qualifiers 1 and 2 could not feature major league players such as the above ones who qualified to play for Team Israel. Kevin Youkilis announced that he would play for the team if they made it past the qualifying round.

The highest-level players involved in Qualifiers 1 and 2 were minor-league prospects ranked among the top 20 in their respective organizations. Team Israel, managed by former major league All Star Brad Ausmus and coached by former major leaguer Gabe Kapler, included minor league pitchers Eric Berger (1–0) and Brett Lorin, first baseman Nate Freiman (.417; 4 HR in 12 AB), second baseman Josh Satin (.273), shortstops Jake Lemmerman and Ben Orloff, and outfielders Adam Greenberg, Ben Guez, Joc Pederson (.308), and Robbie Widlansky. Also, retired major leaguer Shawn Green played for Israel (.333).

In Qualifier 1, Israel and Spain both won easily in the first round. Israel then beat Spain in the winner's bracket. Spain then eliminated South Africa to earn a rematch with Israel. Spain won the winner-take-all final game, 9–7 in 10 innings, to advance to the main tournament.

== Bracket ==
Preliminaries
–	Israel	7
–	South Africa	3
–	France	0
–	Spain	8
Lower round 1
L1	South Africa	5
L2	France	2

Semifinals
W1	Israel	4
W2	Spain	2
Lower final
W4	South Africa	3
L3	Spain	13

Qualifier
W3	Israel	7
W5	Spain	9

== Results ==
- All times are Eastern Daylight Time (UTC−04:00).

=== Israel 7, South Africa 3 ===
September 19 19:00 at Roger Dean Stadium
Team	1	2	3	4	5	6	7	8	9	R	H	E
Israel	1	0	0	0	0	0	1	3	2	7	10	1
South Africa	0	0	0	0	0	0	0	0	3	3	3	2
WP: Eric Berger (1–0) LP: Dylan Unsworth (0–1); Home runs: ISR: Nate Freiman 2 (2); RSA: None; Attendance: 1,581 (23.0%); Umpires: HP − Chris Segal, 1B − Sean Barber, 2B − Trevor Grieve, 3B − Jens Waider; Boxscore

=== Spain 8, France 0 ===
September 20 19:00 at Roger Dean Stadium
Team	1	2	3	4	5	6	7	8	9	R	H	E
France	0	0	0	0	0	0	0	0	0	0	5	2
Spain	2	3	2	0	0	0	0	1	X	8	16	0
WP: Nick Schumacher (1–0) LP: Patrice Briones (0–1); Home runs: FRA: None; ESP: Bárbaro Cañizares (1); Attendance: 975 (14.2%); Umpires: HP − Quinn Wolcott, 1B − Jairo Mendoza, 2B − Sean Barber, 3B − Trevor Grieve; Boxscore

=== Israel 4, Spain 2 ===
September 21 13:00 at Roger Dean Stadium
Team	1	2	3	4	5	6	7	8	9	R	H	E
Israel	0	0	0	0	0	2	0	2	0	4	7	1
Spain	0	0	0	0	0	1	0	0	1	2	8	2
WP: Justin Schumer (1–0) LP: Richard Salazar (0–1) Sv: Josh Zeid (1); Home runs: ISR: Nate Freiman 2 (4); ESP: None; Attendance: 814 (11.8%); Umpires: HP − Sean Barber, 1B − Chris Segal, 2B − Jens Waider, 3B − Jairo Mendoza; Boxscore

=== South Africa 5, France 2 ===
September 21 19:00 at Roger Dean Stadium
Team	1	2	3	4	5	6	7	8	9	10	11	R	H	E
South Africa	0	0	0	0	2	0	0	0	0	0	3	5	5	1
France	2	0	0	0	0	0	0	0	0	0	0	2	11	2
WP: Dylan De Meyer (1–0) LP: Pierrick Le Mestre (0–1); Attendance: 922 (13.4%); Umpires: HP − Trevor Grieve, 1B − Jairo Mendoza, 2B − Quinn Wolcott, 3B − Chris Segal; Notes: Suspended due to rain after 9 innings and completed on September 22. Boxscore

=== Spain 13, South Africa 3 ===
September 22 19:00 at Roger Dean Stadium
Team	1	2	3	4	5	6	7	8	9	R	H	E
Spain	0	4	4	1	0	0	0	1	3	13	14	2
South Africa	0	0	0	1	0	2	0	0	0	3	2	5
WP: Ricardo Hernández (1–0) LP: Kieran Lovegrove (0–1); Attendance: 1,183 (17.2%); Umpires: HP − Quinn Wolcott, 1B − Sean Barber, 2B − Jairo Mendoza, 3B − Jens Waider; Boxscore

=== Spain 9, Israel 7 ===
September 23 17:00 at Roger Dean Stadium
Team	1	2	3	4	5	6	7	8	9	10	R	H	E
Spain	0	0	1	3	1	0	1	1	0	2	9	15	0
Israel	2	0	1	3	0	0	0	1	0	0	7	7	0
WP: Iván Granados (1–0) LP: Josh Zeid (0–1); Attendance: 4,463 (65.0%); Umpires: HP − Chris Segal, 1B − Trevor Grieve, 2B − Jens Waider, 3B − Quinn Wolcott; Boxscore
