= Dustin Delucchi =

Italian baseball player

- Outfielder
- Born: 23 December 1977 (age 48); San Francisco, California, U.S.
- Bats: Left Throws: Left

Dustin Joseph Delucchi (born 23 December 1977) is an American former professional baseball player who has played for Major League Baseball organizations Seattle Mariners, San Diego Padres, and for the Italy national baseball team.

== Early life ==
Dustin Joseph Delucchi was born on December 23, 1977, in San Francisco, California. Delucchi attended Junípero Serra High School in San Mateo, California, where he excelled in football, basketball, and baseball. He also played football and baseball alongside Tom Brady. He graduated in 1996 and was inducted into the school's Athletics Hall of Fame in 2012.

== College career ==
After high school, he first played college baseball at Arizona State from 1997 until 1999. In 1997, he played collegiate summer baseball with the Brewster Whitecaps of the Cape Cod Baseball League. Delucchi was on the team which was a runner-up in the 1998 NCAA Division I baseball tournament. He then played college baseball for the University of San Francisco where he set a school record in 2000 with 22 doubles.

== Professional career ==
=== Minor leagues ===
He was undrafted out of college and began his professional career with three seasons in independent baseball, playing for the Evansville Otters, Dubois County Dragons, Winnipeg Goldeyes and Lincoln Saltdogs. In September 2002, the Saltdogs sold his contract to the Seattle Mariners.

Delucchi played in the Pacific Coast League in Triple-A with the Tacoma Rainiers before being released by the Mariners in May 2005. Delucchi caught on with the San Diego Padres later that year and played the remainder of the season in their farm system.

Delucchi played for the Italian team at the 2006 World Baseball Classic. He started in all three of the team's games against Australia, the Dominican Republic and Venezuela.

He began the 2006 season with the Sioux Falls Canaries of the independent American Association. In July of that season, the Canaries resold his contract to the San Diego Padres. He played the remainder of that season in the Padres system. It would be his last season of professional baseball.
