= Brian Armstrong (American football) =

American football coach (born 1973)

Current position
- Title: Run game coordinator/Offensive line coach
- Team: Nevada
- Conference: Mountain West

Biographical details
- Born: September 24, 1973 (age 53)

Playing career
- 1992–1995: Western Montana
- Position: Offensive lineman

Coaching career (HC unless noted)
- 1996–1997: Western Montana (OL)
- 1998: Morgan High School (OC)
- 1999–2000: Broadwater High School (OC)
- 2001: Lake Gibson High School (OC)
- 2002: Lake Gibson High School
- 2003–2004: Utah State (GA)
- 2005–2006: Kathleen High School
- 2007–2008: Rocky Mountain (OC/OL)
- 2009–2015: Rocky Mountain
- 2016: Montana State (OL)
- 2017–2018: Montana State (OC)
- 2018: Montana State (TE)
- 2018–2022: Montana State (RGC)
- 2019–2022: Montana State (OL)
- 2023: Fresno State (OL)
- 2024–present: Nevada (OL/RGC)

Head coaching record
- Overall: 37–41 (college)
- Tournaments: 0–1 (NAIA playoffs)

Accomplishments and honors

Awards
- 2× Frontier Conference Coach of the Year (2010, 2013); 2× First-team All-Frontier (1994, 1995)

Brian Armstrong (born September 24, 1973) is an American college football coach who is the run game coordinator and offensive line coach for the Nevada Wolf Pack. He was the head coach at Rocky Mountain College from 2009 to 2015.

== Early life ==
Armstrong was born on September 24, 1973. He is a native of East Helena, Montana. He attended Helena High School and graduated in 1992.

Armstrong was a letterman in football and wrestling for the Western Montana Bulldogs from 1992 to 1995. He earned first-team All-Frontier Conference honors in 1994 and 1995. Armstrong also garnered NAIA honorable mention All-American recognition as a senior offensive lineman in 1995. He graduated with a Bachelor of Science degree in elementary education in 1998. He was inducted into the school's athletics hall of fame in 2018.

== Coaching career ==
Armstrong began his coaching career as the offensive line coach at his alma mater, Western Montana, from 1996 to 1997.

He was then the offensive coordinator at Morgan High School in Utah in 1998, at Broadwater High School in Montana from 1999 to 2000, and at Lake Gibson High School in Florida in 2001. He was promoted to Lake Gibson's head coach in 2002 and had an 11–3 record that year.

Armstrong was an offensive graduate assistant for the Utah State Aggies of Utah State University from 2003 to 2004. He was the head coach at Kathleen High School in Florida from 2005 to 2006, accumulating a record of 21–6.

Armstrong was then the offensive coordinator/offensive line coach for the Rocky Mountain Battlin' Bears of Rocky Mountain College from 2007 to 2008. He became the interim head coach in July 2009 after David Reeves left for an assistant coaching job at Northern Arizona. Armstrong's interim designation was removed on November 17, 2009. He continued to serve as head coach through the 2015 season. He was named the Frontier Conference Coach of the Year in both 2010 and 2013.

In 2016, Armstrong resigned from Rocky Mountain to join the Montana State Bobcats of Montana State University as an assistant coach. He was offensive line coach in 2016 and from 2019 to 2022, offensive coordinator from 2017 to 2018, tight ends coach in 2018, and run game coordinator from 2018 to 2022. He was demoted from offensive coordinator midway through the 2018 season and replaced by Matt Miller.

Armstrong was the offensive line coach for the Fresno State Bulldogs of California State University, Fresno in 2023. In 2024, he joined the Nevada Wolf Pack of the University of Nevada, Reno as the offensive line coach and run game coordinator.

== Head coaching record ==
=== College ===
Year	Team	Overall	Conference	Standing	Bowl/playoffs	NAIA^{#}
Rocky Mountain Battlin' Bears (Frontier Conference) (2009–2015)
2009	Rocky Mountain	2–9	1–9	T–5th		
2010	Rocky Mountain	6–5	6–4	2nd		
2011	Rocky Mountain	5–6	4–6	4th		
2012	Rocky Mountain	6–5	5–5	4th		
2013	Rocky Mountain	8–4	7–3	T–2nd	L NAIA First Round	11
2014	Rocky Mountain	5–6	4–6	5th		
2015	Rocky Mountain	5–6	4–6	T–4th		
Rocky Mountain:		37–41	31–39			
Total:		37–41				
^{#}Rankings from final NAIA Coaches' Poll.
