= Brian Armstrong =

Brian Armstrong may refer to:

- Brian Armstrong, ring name used by Brian Girard James (born 1969), American professional wrestler better known by another ring name, Road Dogg
- Brian Armstrong (footballer), New Zealand international football (soccer) player
- Brian Armstrong (businessman), (born 1983), founder and CEO of Coinbase
- Brian Armstrong (American football), American college football coach
