= David Reeves =

David Reeves may refer to:

- Davy DMX (born 1960), American hip hop musician
- David Wallis Reeves (1838–1900), American composer
- David Reeves (composer) (born 1943), Australian composer and organist
- David Reeves (American football), American college football coach
- David Reeves, president and CEO of Sony Computer Entertainment, 2005–2009
- Dave Reeves (born 1967), English former footballer
- David Leroy Reeves (1872–1949), American football player and coach
