= Salomón Manríquez =

Venezuelan baseball player

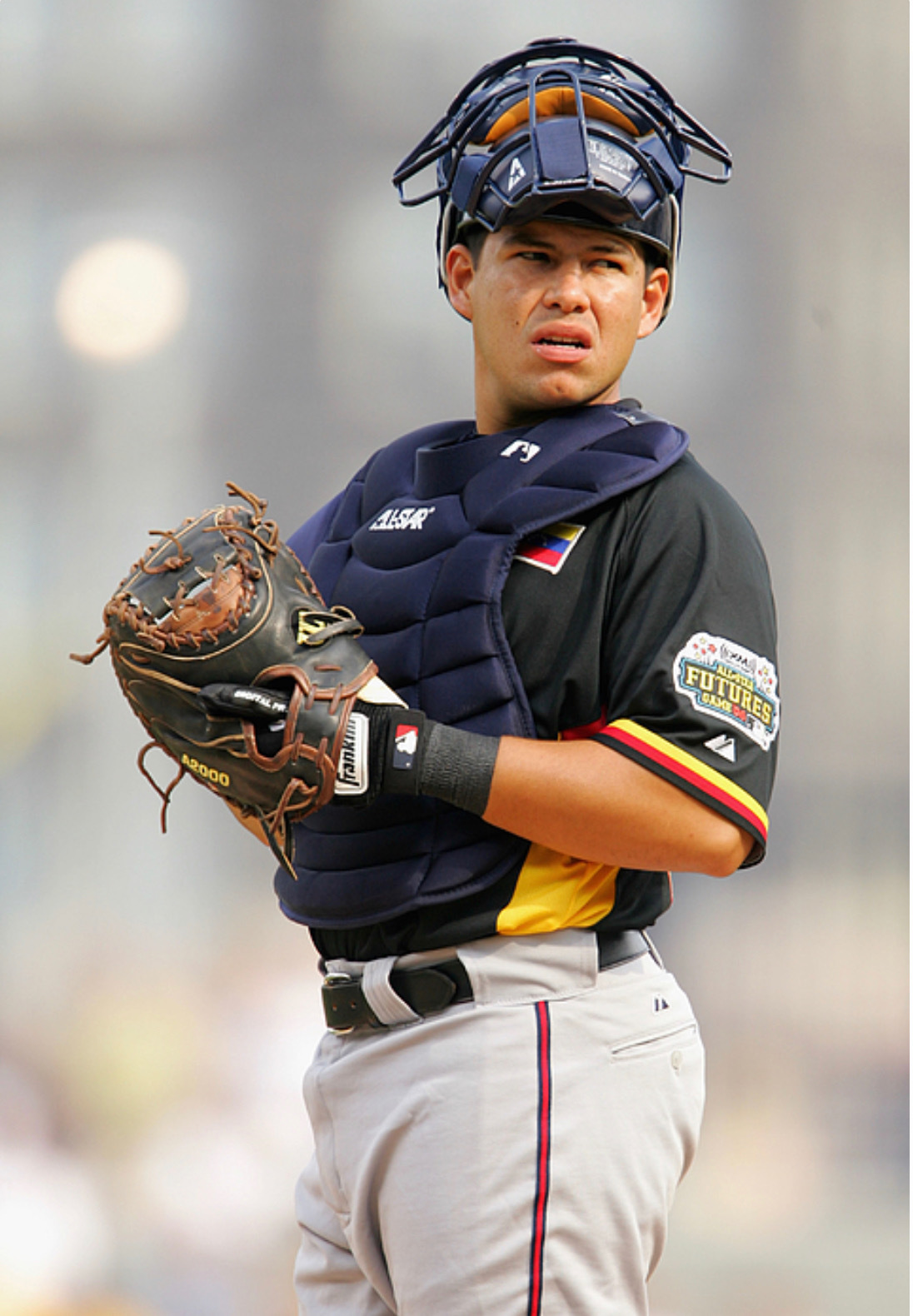
- Manriquez in 2006
- Coach
- Born: September 15, 1982 (age 43); Valencia, Venezuela
- Bats: Right Throws: Right
- Stats at Baseball Reference

Salomón Eduardo Manríquez Rojas (born September 15, 1982) is a Venezuelan former professional baseball player and current professional baseball coach in the Texas Rangers organization. He played for the Expos, Nationals, Rangers, Mets, and Dodgers.

== Playing career ==
He was originally signed as an undrafted free agent by the Montreal Expos in 1999 and played in the Expos/Nationals farm system through 2006, with his highest level being a couple of stints with the AA Harrisburg Senators in 2004 and 2006. He then played for the Frisco RoughRiders in the Texas Rangers system in 2007 and the Binghamton Mets in the New York Mets system in 2008.

Unable to land with an affiliated team in 2009 he joined the Newark Bears of the Atlantic League of Professional Baseball, where he hit .311 and was named an Atlantic League All-Star. He began 2010 back in the Atlantic League, first with the Lancaster Barnstormers and then the York Revolution before returning to the Mets system to play for Binghamton. In 2011, he was promoted to the AAA Buffalo Bisons.

Manríquez was back in the independent leagues in 2012, playing for four teams: York in the Atlantic League, the Wichita Wingnuts and Lincoln Saltdogs in the American Association of Independent Professional Baseball and the Diablos Rojos del Mexico in the Mexican League.

He played for the Spain national baseball team in the 2013 World Baseball Classic. In 2013, he retired from baseball as a member of the Camden Riversharks.

== Coaching career ==
Manriquez retired after the 2013 season and joined the Texas Rangers organization as a coach in 2014. In 2014 he was a coach for the Spokane Indians, and in 2015-2018 he was a coach for the AZL Rangers. In 2019, he returned to Spokane as the hitting coach.

== Personal life ==
Manríquez grew up outside Valencia, Venezuela where his parents operated a business. He has a younger brother and sister. In elementary school, he met his wife, Lori, who he would marry in 2002.

After retiring as a player, Manríquez befriended a U.S. Army recruiter while their sons were on the same swimming team. In 2020, at the age of 37, Manríquez enlisted in the U.S. Army with a military occupation specialty of 15U Helicopter Repairer.
