= Andy Pages =

Cuban baseball player (born 2000)

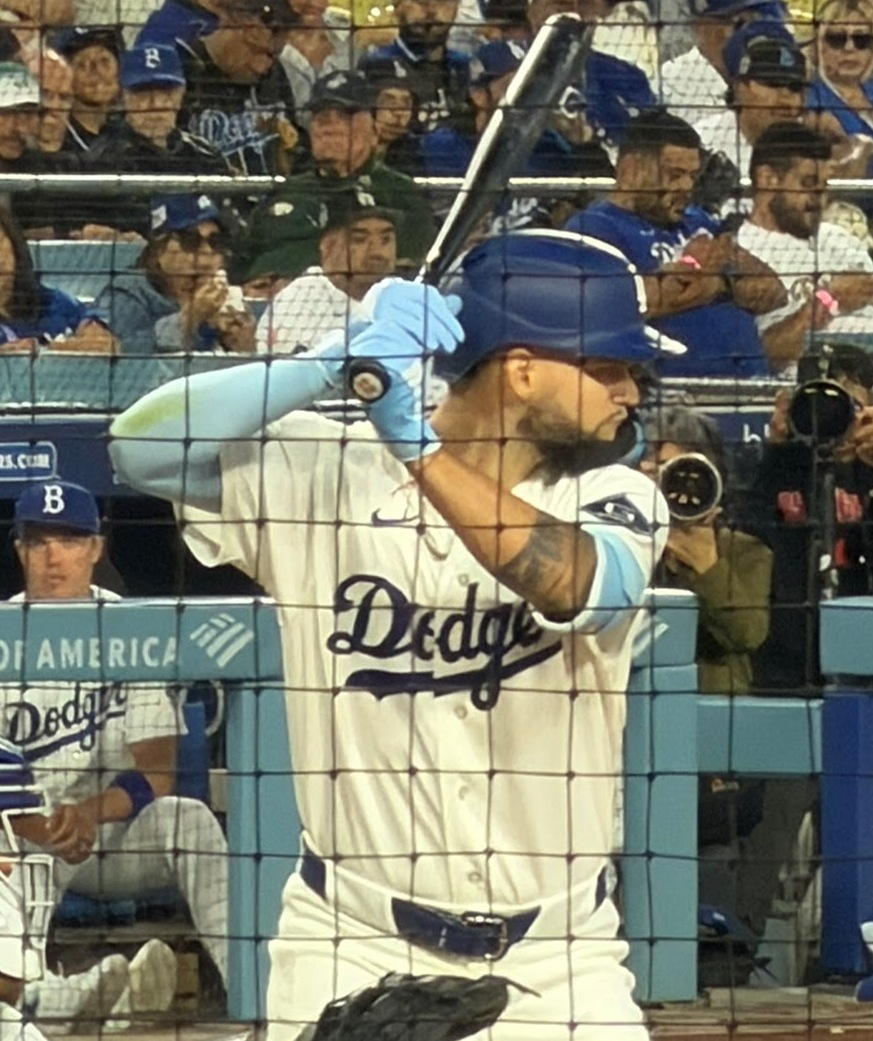
- Pages batting at Dodger Stadium on April 15, 2026

Los Angeles Dodgers – No. 44
- Outfielder
- Born: December 8, 2000 (age 25); Mantua, Cuba
- Bats: Right Throws: Right

MLB debut
- April 16, 2024, for the Los Angeles Dodgers

MLB statistics (through 2026 season)
- Batting average: .266
- Home runs: 63
- Runs batted in: 217
- Stats at Baseball Reference

Teams
- Los Angeles Dodgers (2024–present)

Career highlights and awards
- All-Star (2026); 2× World Series champion (2024, 2025)

Andy Pages (/ˈpɑːhɛs/ PAH-hess) (born December 8, 2000), is a Cuban professional baseball outfielder for the Los Angeles Dodgers of Major League Baseball (MLB). He made his MLB debut in 2024. Pages was named to his first All-Star game in 2026.

== Early life ==
Pages was born in Mantua, Pinar del Río, Cuba, to Juana Maria and Liban Pages. He has a younger sister, Elaine. Pages played sports from a young age, and though he enjoyed basketball, soccer, and volleyball, he showed a particular interest and aptitude for baseball. His father, a carpenter who primarily fixed boats, carved his first bats from wood scraps.

== Career ==
=== Early years in Cuba ===
By 2015, Pages was a rising star among Cuba's young players, hitting .364/.484/.581 with 25 walks and just three strikeouts in 161 plate appearances in the 15-and-under league. At 16, he arranged to be spirited off the island (alongside Jairo Pomares), traveling through Guyana, Curaçao, and Haiti, before crossing into the Dominican Republic, in hopes of getting signed by a Major League Baseball (MLB) team. Eight months later, in March 2018, the Los Angeles Dodgers signed Pages.

=== Los Angeles Dodgers ===
==== 2018–2024: Minor leagues ====
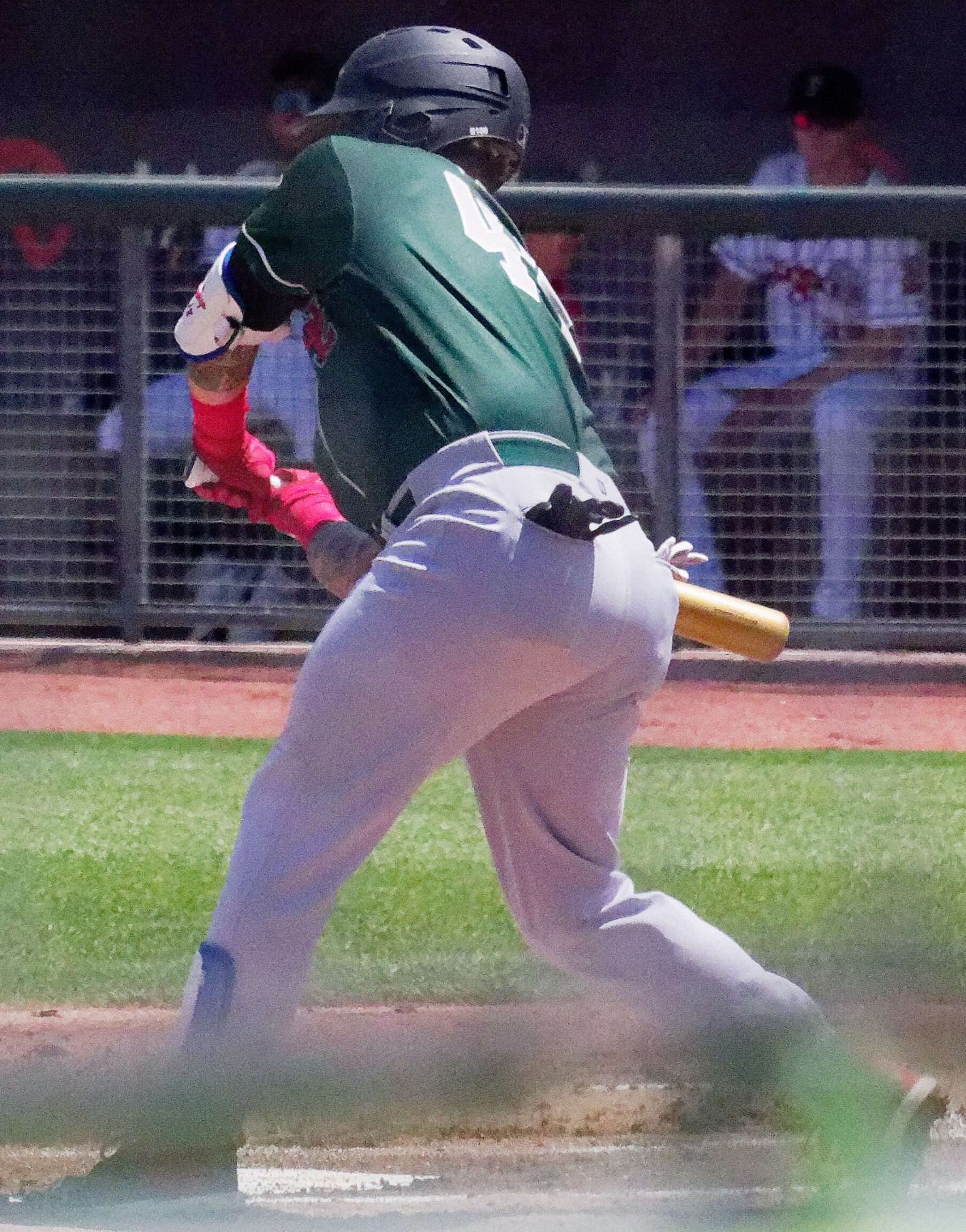
Pages with the Great Lakes Loons

Pages signed with the Los Angeles Dodgers for $300,000 in 2018. He appeared in 10 games for the Arizona League Dodgers and 42 for the Dominican Summer League Dodgers that year, hitting .229. The following season, with the rookie level Ogden Raptors, he led the league in extra-base hits with 43 and ranked second in homers (19), RBI (55), total bases (153) and slugging (.651) as an 18-year-old. He did not play a minor league game in 2020 since the season was cancelled due to the COVID-19 pandemic. He was assigned to the Great Lakes Loons for 2021. He played in 120 games for the Loons, hitting .265 with 31 home runs and 88 RBI. He was selected as a post-season High-A Central All-Star, and he was also named Most Valuable Player and Top MLB Prospect of the league. In 2022, he played for the Tulsa Drillers of the Double-A Texas League, hitting .236 with 26 home runs and 80 RBI.

On November 15, 2022, the Dodgers team added Pages to their 40-man roster to protect him from the Rule 5 draft. Pages returned to Tulsa to begin the 2023 season where he hit .284 in 33 games. He was promoted to the Triple-A Oklahoma City Dodgers on May 16. Pages appeared in only one game in Triple-A, striking out twice in three at-bats before tearing the labrum in his shoulder and missing the rest of the season.

==== 2024: Call-up to the major leagues ====
After spring training, Pages returned to Oklahoma City to begin the 2024 season and was promoted to the major leagues for the first time on April 16. He started in center field that day against the Washington Nationals and singled in his first MLB at-bat off Patrick Corbin. Pages hit his first major league home run off Grant Hartwig of the New York Mets on April 21. On May 3, he had four hits, including his first MLB walk-off RBI in a game against the Atlanta Braves. In 116 games, Pages batted .248 with 13 home runs and 46 RBI. He was hitless in two at-bats in the 2024 NLDS.

In Game 5 of the 2024 National League Championship Series, Pages hit two home runs, becoming the first Dodgers rookie to homer twice in a single playoff game. He had a total of four hits in 17 at-bats in the series. He was on the active roster for the 2024 World Series but did not appear in the series, in which the Dodgers won in five games.

==== 2025 season ====
On April 28, 2025, Pages was named the National League Player of the Week, co-winning with Eugenio Suárez for the 5th week of the season after going 13-for-20 (.650) and slugging 1.250 with four home runs and six RBI in that period, including three doubles and a home run in a three-game home series against the Pittsburgh Pirates. On June 17, Pages hit his first career multi-home run regular season game against the San Diego Padres as he went 4-for-4 with two home runs and three RBIs in an 8–6 victory. Pages finished the season batting .272/.313/.461 with 27 home runs and 86 runs batted in.

Pages struggled offensively in the postseason. He was hitless in nine at-bats in the Wild Card Series and had only one hit in 15 at-bats in the 2025 NLDS. He did drive in the series-clinching run in the 11th inning of Game 4, hitting a weak grounder to the mound against the Philadelphia Phillies that was misplayed by relief pitcher Orion Kerkering and scored pinch-runner Hyeseong Kim. In the 2025 NLCS, he had two hits (including a double) in 11 at-bats.

Pages would remain on the starting lineup for the 2025 World Series against the Toronto Blue Jays but continue to struggle offensively, again recording just one hit in 15 at-bats through the first four games, before being replaced in the starting lineup before Game 5. In the bottom of the ninth inning of Game 7, with the score tied and the bases loaded, Pages replaced Tommy Edman in center field then made a game-saving catch on a long fly ball to extend the game. The Dodgers would go on to win for a second consecutive World Series championship.

==== 2026 Season ====
Pages showed continued improvement and offensive production to start the 2026 season. On April 6, following the first complete week of the season, Pages was named the National League Player of the Week for the second time in his career after five consecutive multi-hit games while slashing .583/.615/.917 with 14 hits, two home runs, and seven RBI. A month later, on May 6, he hit a career-high three home runs against the Houston Astros. Pages was named an All-Star on the 4th of July, after leading MLB in defensive assists (10), defensive WAR (1.8), and hitting .269 with 16 home runs and 62 RBI in the first 88 games.

On August 21, Pages left a game after being hit by a pitch, from Pittsburgh Pirates pitcher Bubba Chandler, which fractured his hand. With five weeks left in the season, he was placed on the injured list. After a month away, he was activated for the final six games of the season. He ended the season slashing .274/.343/.468, hit 23 home runs and led the team with 85 RBI. His season Wins Above Replacement (WAR) of 6.0 more than doubled his career WAR.

In the National League Division Series against the Braves, Pages went 2-for-11, with one walk, in the first three games, continuing his postseason struggles from 2025. However, in the fourth game, with two outs and the bases loaded, he hit a 2-run single to put the Dodgers ahead. The hit broke a Dodgers hitless streak of 0-for-14 with Runners in Scoring Position (RISP) and they proceeded to beat the Braves 4-1 and advance to the National League Championship Series.

== Personal life ==
Pages is married to Alondra Pages. Due to the political situation between the U.S. and Cuba that prevented most travel between the countries, Pages did not see his family in person for seven years after he defected, when he visited them during the winter before his call-up in 2024. Pages has become especially close with teammate Teoscar Hernández, who has a history of mentoring players far from home, such as former Toronto Blue Jays teammate Vladimir Guerrero Jr.
