= Richard Salazar =

- Pitcher
- Born: October 6, 1981 (age 44); Caracas, Venezuela
- Bats: Left Throws: Left
- Stats at Baseball Reference

Richard Jesus (da Silva) Salazar (born September 6, 1981) is a Venezuelan former professional baseball pitcher who is currently a coach in the Minnesota Twins minor league system.

He was drafted by the Baltimore Orioles in the 13th round of the 2001 MLB draft out of Miami-Dade College. He played in the Orioles farm system through 2007, reaching AAA with the Norfolk Tides. In 2005, he was suspended 15 games for violating baseball's minor league steroid policy.

Upon his release by the Orioles organization, he began playing independent league baseball in the American Association of Independent Professional Baseball with the Wichita Wingnuts (2008-2009), Shreveport-Bossier Captains (2009-2011) and the Sioux City Explorers (2011-2012). He also played with the Rockland Boulders of the Can-Am League.

He was on the roster for the Spain national baseball team in the 2013 World Baseball Classic.

In 2026, he was named as the pitching coach for the Fort Myers Mighty Mussels the Single-A affiliate of the Minnesota Twins.
