= Adarius Taylor =

American football player (born 1990)

No. 57, 53
- Position: Linebacker

Personal information
- Born: September 21, 1990 (age 36); Bartow, Florida, U.S.
- Listed height: 6 ft 0 in (1.83 m)
- Listed weight: 230 lb (104 kg)

Career information
- High school: Lake Gibson (Lakeland, Florida)
- College: Florida Atlantic
- NFL draft: 2014: undrafted

Career history
- Carolina Panthers (2014–2015); Tampa Bay Buccaneers (2015–2018); Cleveland Browns (2019); Carolina Panthers (2020); Calgary Stampeders (2023)

Career NFL statistics
- Total tackles: 125
- Sacks: 2
- Forced fumbles: 3
- Fumble recoveries: 1
- Interceptions: 1
- Defensive touchdowns: 1
- Stats at Pro Football Reference
- Stats at CFL.ca

Adarius Taylor (born Adarius Glanton; September 21, 1990) is an American former professional football player who was a linebacker in the National Football League (NFL) for the Carolina Panthers, Tampa Bay Buccaneers, and Cleveland Browns. He played college football at Eastern Arizona College and Florida Atlantic University. He also played for the Calgary Stampeders of the Canadian Football League (CFL).

== Early life ==
Taylor participated in football, track and basketball at Lake Gibson High School in Lakeland, Florida.

== College career ==
Taylor first enrolled at Iowa Western Community College before transferring to Eastern Arizona College, where he played college football for the Eastern Arizona College Gila Monsters. He was named first-team All-Conference and All-Region as a sophomore, recording 85 tackles, 5.5 sacks, and two forced fumbles. He later transferred to play for the Florida Atlantic Owls from 2012 to 2013.

== Professional career ==
Pre-draft measurables
Height	Weight	Arm length	Hand span	40-yard dash	10-yard split	20-yard split	20-yard shuttle	Three-cone drill	Vertical jump	Broad jump	Bench press
5 ft 11 1/2 in (1.82 m)	233 lb (106 kg)	30 3/4 in (0.78 m)	8 1/8 in (0.21 m)	4.59 s	1.68 s	2.65 s	4.50 s	7.09 s	33 in (0.84 m)	9 ft 9 in (2.97 m)	32 reps
All values from Florida Atlantic's Pro Day

=== Carolina Panthers (first stint) ===
==== 2014 ====
On May 10, 2014, the Carolina Panthers signed Taylor to a three-year, $1.53 million contract that includes a signing bonus of $16,000. Throughout training camp, Taylor competed for a roster spot against Anthony Morales, Jason Williams, and Denicos Allen. On August 30, 2014, Taylor was waived as part of the Panthers' final roster cuts, but was signed to the team's practice squad on September 1, 2014.

On October 19, 2014, Taylor made his professional regular season debut as the Panthers' lost 38–17 at the Green Bay Packers. On December 21, 2014, Taylor earned his first career start in place of A. J. Klein who sustained an ankle injury the previous week. Taylor finished the Panthers' 17–13 win against the Cleveland Browns with a season-high six combined tackles. In Week 17, Taylor recorded five combined tackles and forced the first fumble of his career during a 34–3 win at the Atlanta Falcons. He finished his rookie season in 2014 with 12 combined tackles (eight solo) in ten games and two starts.

==== 2015 ====
Taylor entered training camp as a backup linebacker and competed for a roster spot against A.J. Klein. On September 5, 2015, the Carolina Panthers released Taylor as part of their final roster cuts and signed him to their practice squad the next day.

=== Tampa Bay Buccaneers ===
==== 2015 ====
On November 30, 2015, the Tampa Bay Buccaneers signed Taylor off the Panthers' practice squad. Head coach Lovie Smith named Taylor the third middle linebacker on the depth chart, behind Kwon Alexander and Bruce Carter. Taylor appeared in five games, primarily on special teams, and did not record a statistic during the 2015 NFL season.

==== 2016 ====
On January 6, 2016, the Tampa Bay Buccaneers announced their decision to fire head coach Lovie Smith after they finished with a 9–7 record and did not qualify for the playoffs in 2015. On January 15, 2016, the Tampa Bay Buccaneers officially promoted offensive coordinator Dirk Koetter to head coach. During training camp in 2016, Taylor competed for a roster spot as a backup middle linebacker against Luke Rhodes. On November 3, 2016, Taylor collected a season-high six solo tackles during the Buccaneers' 43–28 loss against the Atlanta Falcons in Week 9. On January 1, 2017, against the Carolina Panthers, long snapper Andrew DePaola suffered a torn ACL late in the third quarter. Taylor then served as the long snapper for a successful extra point late in the fourth quarter to help the Buccaneers win by a score of 17–16. He finished the 2016 NFL season with 13 combined tackles (11 solo) in 16 games and zero starts.

==== 2017 ====
On February 28, 2017, the Tampa Bay Buccaneers assigned a one-year, $690,000 tender to Taylor as a restricted free agent. On April 18, 2017, Taylor signed his one-year, $690,000 restricted free agent tender to remain with the Tampa Bay Buccaneers. Throughout training camp, Taylor competed against Devante Bond, Kendell Beckwith, and Cameron Lynch to be the starting strongside linebacker after it was left vacant by the departure of Daryl Smith. Head coach Dirk Koetter named Taylor the backup middle linebacker, behind Kwon Alexander, to begin the regular season in 2017.

In Week 3, Taylor collected a season-high eight combined tackles during a 34–17 loss at the Minnesota Vikings. On October 5, 2017, Taylor recorded seven combined tackles, forced a fumble, and made his first career sack during a 19–14 loss against the New England Patriots in Week 5. Taylor sacked Patriots' quarterback Tom Brady for a six-yard loss in the third quarter and forced a fumble by Brady that was recovered by teammate Will Clarke. On December 18, 2017, Taylor started in place of Lavonte David who was inactive due to a hamstring injury and made four combined tackles before being carted off the field during the third quarter of the Buccaneers' 24–21 loss against the Atlanta Falcons in Week 15. Taylor sustained a broken tibia and fibula after colliding with teammate Robert Ayers as both attempted to sack Falcons' quarterback Matt Ryan. On December 20, 2017, the Tampa Bay Buccaneers officially placed Taylor on injured reserve. Taylor finished the 2017 NFL season with 31 combined tackles (22 solo), one pass deflection, and one sack in 14 games and four starts.

==== 2018 ====
During training camp, Taylor competed against Devante Bond to be the starting strongside linebacker. The role was left vacant after Kendell Beckwith sustained a broken ankle during a car accident. Head coach Dirk Koetter named Taylor the strongside linebacker to begin the regular season, alongside Lavonte David and middle linebacker Kwon Alexander. In Week 9, he collected a season-high nine combined tackles (four solo) during a 42–28 loss at the Carolina Panthers.

=== Cleveland Browns ===
On March 14, 2019, Taylor signed a two-year contract with the Cleveland Browns.

Taylor was released by the Browns on February 17, 2020.

=== Carolina Panthers (second stint) ===
On July 27, 2020, Taylor was signed by the Panthers. He played in nine games before being placed on injured reserve on November 11. Taylor was activated off of injured reserve on December 12.

=== Calgary Stampeders ===
On September 26, 2023, Taylor was signed to the practice roster of the Calgary Stampeders. He was later promoted to the active roster and dressed in three games for the Stampeders during the season, recording five tackles on defense, three tackles on special teams, and two forced fumbles. Taylor was released by the Stampeders on November 16.

== Personal life ==
Taylor had his last name changed to honor his father Basil George Taylor who died when Taylor was 16 years old. Before he changed his last name, it was Glanton, which is his mother's last name. Taylor's father was born in St. Catherine, Jamaica and immigrated to the US in 1979.

In May 2025, Taylor was arrested and charged with negligent child abuse and solicitation of prostitution.
