= Sioux Falls Canaries =

Minor-league professional baseball team in Sioux Falls, South Dakota

Logo
Cap insignia

Information
- League: American Association of Professional Baseball (2006–present) (West Division)
- Location: Sioux Falls, South Dakota
- Ballpark: Sioux Falls Stadium
- Founded: 1993
- Nickname: The Birds
- League championships: 1: 2008
- Former name: Sioux Falls Canaries (1993–2010, 2013–present); Sioux Falls Fighting Pheasants (2010–2012)
- Former league: Northern League (1993–2005)
- Colors: Blue, navy, canary yellow, white
- Retired numbers: 7 (Beau Torbert); 14 (Trevor Lawhorn); 25 (Ben Moore); 28 (Pat Mahomes)
- Ownership: True North Sports LLC
- President: Brian Jamros
- General manager: Duell Higbe
- Manager: Mike Meyer
- Media: KWSN 1230 AM; Sioux Falls Argus Leader
- Website: sfcanaries.com

The Sioux Falls Canaries are a professional baseball team based in Sioux Falls, South Dakota, United States. The Canaries are members of the North Division of the American Association of Professional Baseball, an official Partner League of Major League Baseball. Since the 1993 season, the Canaries have played their home games at Sioux Falls Stadium, commonly known as The Birdcage. From 2010 to 2012, the team was called the Sioux Falls Fighting Pheasants.

== History ==
=== Early Sioux Falls teams ===
Professional baseball in Sioux Falls dates back at least to 1902, when the original Canaries joined the Iowa–South Dakota League. That team and its league lasted just two seasons. Another team, known variously as the Soos as well as the Canaries, was a member of the Dakota League from 1920 to 1923, then moved to the short-lived Tri-State League in 1924.

The longest-lived Canaries prior to the current team were founded in 1933 as part of the Nebraska State League. They joined the Western League in 1939, then joined the original Northern League when the Western League folded after the 1941 season. The Canaries played in the Northern League in 1942 and again from 1946 to 1953. The Sioux Falls Packers played in the collegiate summer Basin League from 1964 to 1965. Baseball Hall of Fame inductee Don Sutton played for the Sioux Falls Packers in 1964.

The city was without a Northern League franchise until 1966. Then, the Sioux Falls Packers began play and spent six seasons in the circuit until the league ceased operations following the 1971 campaign.

=== Current team ===
A handful of independent baseball pioneers revived the Northern League in 1993. Sioux Falls competed in a six-team league, joining the St. Paul Saints, Rochester Aces, Thunder Bay Whiskey Jacks, Sioux City Explorers, and Duluth–Superior Dukes.

On the field, the Canaries enjoyed great success in 1994 and 1996. Former major leaguer Pedro Guerrero batted .329 with eight home runs and 47 RBIs for the 1994 Canaries, as the team posted a 47–33 record. Sioux Falls was narrowly beat out by Sioux City in the first half of the season while the "Birds" finished four games out of first in the second half. Chris Powell batted a league-best .357, while Jamie Ybarra paced all league hurlers with 10 wins and 109 strikeouts.

In 1996, the Canaries overcame a 20–22 first half to the season and posted a 24–18 mark over the second half of the campaign. Even then, the team finished three games back of the Fargo-Moorhead RedHawks.

New ownership took over the club in 1998, with a new logo being put into use shortly thereafter.

The Canaries posted a 55–35 record in 2001 and gained the team's first playoff berth since the league re-emerged in 1993. On July 11, 2001, the Canaries won the first-half title in the South Division on the final day of the half. Sioux Falls won 21–7 win over Duluth-Superior in the game that secured its first pennant and its first playoff appearance.

Team owners and city officials hosted a ceremonial groundbreaking in November 1999, kicking off a US$5.6 million renovation to Sioux Falls Stadium. The new Birdcage drew national attention on June 2, 2001, as USA Today writer Mel Antonen wrote a feature story on the retrofit. The project drew praise for the integration of an existing facility with more modern elements. Sioux Falls Stadium now features nine luxury suites, a 3,000-square-foot (280 m^{2}) home clubhouse, a group barbecue area, and a video wall/scoreboard that features live and recorded video clips as well as animated pieces.

On September 29, 2005, the Canaries left the Northern League, along with the Lincoln Saltdogs, the Sioux City Explorers and the St. Paul Saints to form the American Association for the 2006 season.

Sioux Falls struggled early on in the new league, with the 2008 season serving as a notable exception. They posted their best regular-season record ever at 60–36, and won the first-half North Division championship with a 31–17 mark. In the 2008 playoffs, the Canaries swept rival Sioux City in three games, then took the best-of-five series against Grand Prairie for the American Association championship 3-1, earning the clinching win on a walk-off single in the bottom of the 12th inning of Game 4.

On March 25, 2013, Sioux Falls Sports LLC, the ownership group of the Sioux Falls Pheasants and Sioux Falls Stampede, announced they had changed the name of the franchise from the Sioux Falls Fighting Pheasants back to the original name, "Sioux Falls Canaries." The club unveiled the team logos for the Canaries, designed by Fresh Produce of Sioux Falls.

On March 12, 2021, Brian Slipka, small business leader, and Anthony Albanese (Twan), co-founder of Duke Cannon Supply Co., purchased the Canaries through True North Sports LLC.

On May 6, 2021, Sioux Falls Canaries owners Brian Slipka and Anthony Albanese launched the Canaries Community Fund, an initiative of the True North Family Foundation, to support charitable organizations and causes in South Dakota.

The Canaries Community Fund focuses on the True North Family Foundation’s three pillars — education, community engagement, and character-building among youth.

The Canaries award scholarships to children to cover participation fees in extracurriculars, provide baseball tickets to youth, families, and charitable organizations, and are active in the Sioux Falls community.

== Roster ==
Sioux Falls Canaries roster
Active roster	Coaching staff
Pitchers: 22 Tanner Brown; 24 Dylan Chalmers; 32 Jose Cruz; 9 Ty Culbreth; 23 Matthew Dunaway; 34 Charlie Hasty; 13 Christian Johnson; 6 Neil Lang; 17 Seth Miller; 27 Brady Stover; 8 Zach Veen; 10 Ryan Zimmerman; Catchers: 35 Shamoy Christopher ‡; 29 Scott Combs; 12 Spencer Sarringar; Infielders: 5 Trevor Achenbach; 3 Jordan Barth; 2 Ernny Ordoñez; 36 Josh Rehwaldt; 21 Liam Spence; Outfielders: 16 Hunter Clanin; 20 Mike Hart; 11 Jabari Henry; 15 Drew Mount; 1 Wyatt Ulrich; -- Aaron Whitefield ‡	Manager: 38 Mike Meyer; Coaches: Ryan Christopher (clubhouse manager); 9 Ty Culbreth (pitching); Megan Feerick (trainer); Disabled list; ‡ Inactive list; § Suspended list; Roster updated August 9, 2024 Transactions

== Notable alumni ==
- Carl Nichols (1993–1994)
- Pedro Guerrero (1993–1994) 5x MLB All-Star
- John Mitchell (1993)
- Steve Bishop (1994)
- Ken Grundt (1994)
- Benny Castillo (1995–1998)
- Paul Carey (1996)
- Steve Hosey (1996)
- Chris Pollard (1996)
- Eric Yelding (1996)
- Gerald Young (1997)
- Lee Guetterman (1997)
- Steve Howe (1997) MLB All-Star
- Terry Pearson (1997, 2000)
- Brian Traxler (1997, 2000)
- Kim Batiste (1998)
- Harry Berrios (1998)
- Bernardo Brito (1998)
- Juan Nieves (1998)
- Chuck Smith (1998)
- Ron Jones (1999)
- Dennis Moeller (1999)
- Jason Pearson (1999)
- Mike Busch (2000–2001)
- George Sherrill (2001)
- Tagg Bozied (2001)
- Matt Duff (2001)
- Trey Beamon (2002)
- Desi Wilson (2003)
- Keith Mitchell (2003)
- Will Pennyfeather (2003)
- Ron Wright (2004)
- Les Norman (2005)
- Edgard Clemente (2005–2006)
- Tony Cogan (2005–2006)
- Chad Hermansen (2006)
- Dustin Delucchi (2006)
- Scott Lydy (2007)
- Orlando Miller (2007)
- Pat Mahomes (2007–2009)
- Reggie Taylor (2009)
- Eddy Rodríguez (2010)
- Reggie Abercrombie (2010–2013)
- John Brebbia (2014)
- Chris Duffy (2014)
- Brandon Jones (2014)
- Jason Repko (2015)
- Ángel Chávez (2015)
- Ozney Guillén (2016)
- Misael Siverio (2016)
- José Ortega (2016–2017)
- David Popkins (2017)
- Jake Esch (2018)
- Kyle Schepel (2018)
- Jordan Smith (2018)
- Mitch Glasser (2018–2019, 2021)
- Taylor Hill (2019)
- Adrián Nieto (2019)
- Tyler Herron (2019–2020)
- Clint Coulter (2019-2021)
- Ryan Brett (2020)
- Madison Younginer (2020)
- Tyler Danish (2020)
- Tanner Anderson (2020)
- D. J. Sharabi (2020–2021, 2023)
- Caleb Frare (2021)
- Charlie Valerio (2021)
- Dean Deetz (2022)
- Ryan Miller (2022)
- Osvaldo Martínez (2022–2023)
- Akeem Bostick (2023)
- Darnell Sweeney (2023)
- Aaron Whitefield (2023–2024)
- Liam Spence (2024)

=== Retired numbers ===
Player	Number	Position(s)	Date retired
Beau Torbert	7	OF: 2008–2009 (SFC); OF: 2010 (SFP)	July 8, 2013
Trevor Lawhorn	14	IF: 2007 (SFC); IF: 2009 (SFC); IF: 2010–2012 (SFP)	July 31, 2020
Ben Moore	25	P: 2008–2009 (SFC); P: 2010–2011 (SFP); P: 2013–2014 (SFC); Coach: 2017–2019 (SFC)	July 14, 2018
Pat Mahomes	28	P: 2007–2009 (SFC)	June 28, 2019
