= Jason Watkins (American football) =

American football player (born 1985)

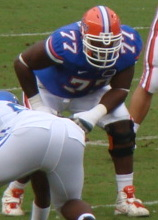
- Watkins (77) with the Florida Gators in 2008

No. 79
- Position: Offensive tackle

Personal information
- Born: July 10, 1985 (age 41); New Orleans, Louisiana, U.S.
- Listed height: 6 ft 6 in (1.98 m)
- Listed weight: 325 lb (147 kg)

Career information
- High school: Lake Gibson (Lakeland, Florida)
- College: Florida
- NFL draft: 2009: undrafted

Career history
- Houston Texans (2009)*; New York Sentinels (2009); Buffalo Bills (2009–2011)*
- * Offseason or practice squad member only

Awards and highlights
- BCS national champion (2007, 2009)
- Stats at Pro Football Reference

Jason Watkins (born July 10, 1985) is an American former professional football player who was an offensive tackle in the National Football League (NFL) and United Football League (UFL). He was signed by the Houston Texans as an undrafted free agent in 2009. He played college football at Florida.

Watkins was also a member of the New York Sentinels and Buffalo Bills.

== Early life ==
Watkins was born in New Orleans, Louisiana. He attended Lake Gibson High School in Lakeland, Florida as a junior and senior, playing football only two years and earning Class 4A all-state, all-county and all-conference first-team accolades as a senior. He participated in the 2003 Cali-Florida Bowl.

== College career ==
Watkins received an athletic scholarship to attend the University of Florida in Gainesville, Florida, where he played for coach Urban Meyer's Florida Gators football team from 2005 to 2008. Watkins helped the Gators win two National Championships (2006 and 2008) as member of the offensive line that paved the way for Heisman Trophy-winning quarterback Tim Tebow.

In his senior season, Watkins was named honorable mention All-Southeastern Conference by the Associated Press, as he produced 78 knockdowns to go with 12 touchdown-resulting blocks. He graded 81.71% and was part of a front wall that gave up just 16 sacks. The Gators went on to capture the national title behind an offense that averaged 445.07 yards and 43.64 points per game

== Professional career ==
Pre-draft measurables
Height	Weight	40-yard dash	20-yard shuttle	Three-cone drill	Vertical jump	Broad jump
6 ft 6 in (1.98 m)	318 lb (144 kg)	5.49 s	5.03 s	7.89 s	24 1/2 in (0.62 m)	7 ft 6 in (2.29 m)
All values from NFL Combine.

=== Houston Texans ===
Watkins was signed on April 28, 2009 by the Houston Texans after going undrafted in the 2009 NFL draft. He was waived on September 5.

=== New York Sentinels ===
Watkins played for the New York Sentinels of the United Football League in 2009.

=== Buffalo Bills ===
After playing in the UFL, Watkins was signed to the Buffalo Bills' practice squad on November 24. After his contract expired following the season, he was re-signed to a future contract on January 5, 2010.
