= Liam Spence =

Australian baseball player (born 1998)

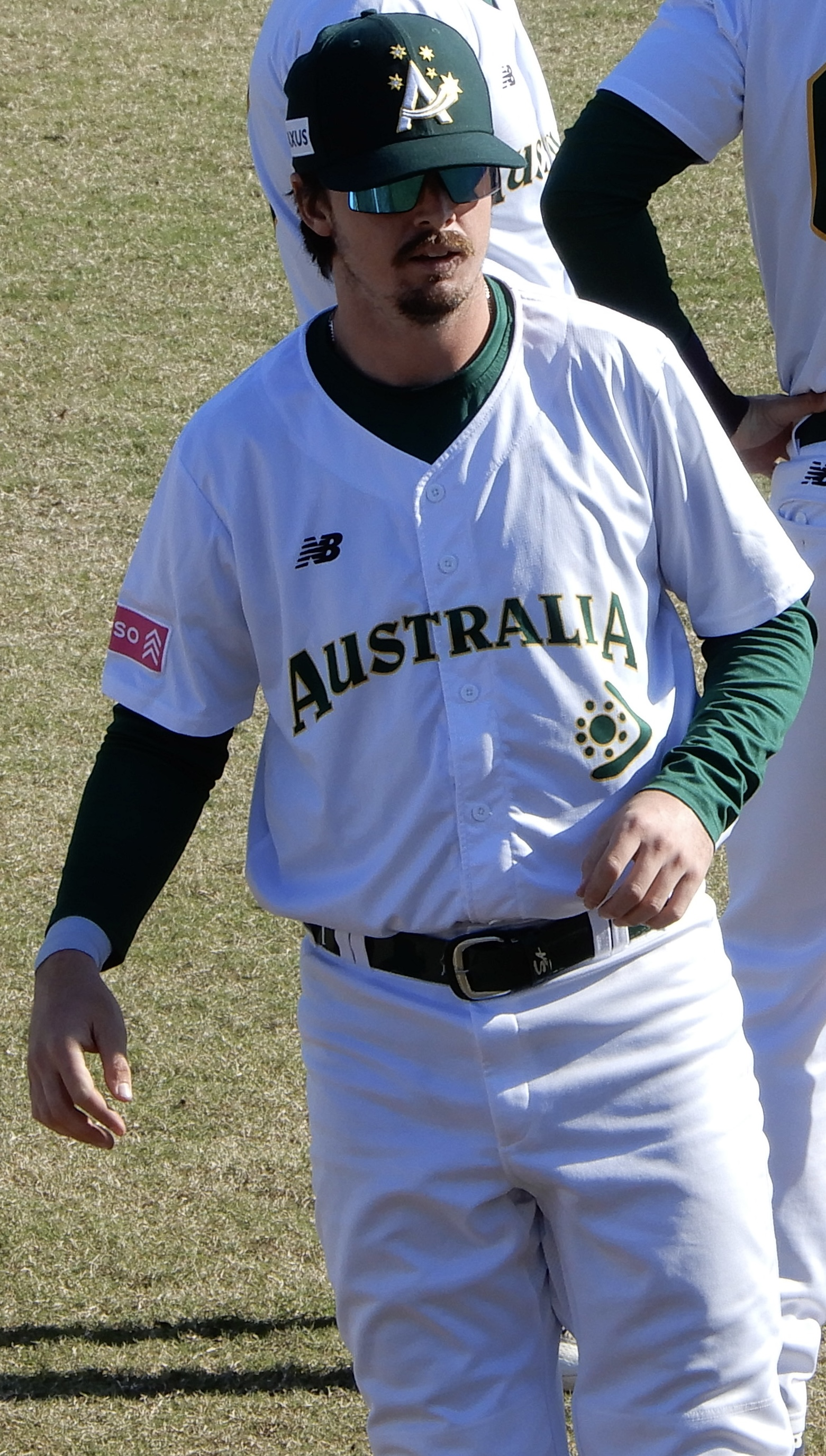
- Spence with the Team Australia in 2024

Firefighters – No. 15
- Infielder
- Born: 9 April 1998 (age 28); Geelong, Victoria, Australia
- Bats: Right Throws: Right

Liam John Spence (born 9 April 1998) is an Australian professional baseball infielder for the Firefighters in the Banana Ball Championship League. Spence is a member of the Australia national baseball team in the 2023 World Baseball Classic.

== Career ==
Spence graduated from St. Joseph's College in Geelong, Victoria. He then attended Central Arizona College, where he played college baseball for two years, before he transferred to the University of Tennessee to play for the Tennessee Volunteers. In 2021, he was a finalist for the Brooks Wallace Award.

=== Chicago Cubs ===
The Chicago Cubs drafted Spence in the fifth round, with the 154th overall selection, of the 2021 Major League Baseball draft. He spent his first professional season with the rookie–level Arizona Complex League Cubs, High–A South Bend Cubs, and Triple–A Iowa Cubs. In 20 total games, he combined for a .175/.243/.175 batting line with six RBI and one stolen base.

Spence split the 2022 campaign between the ACL Cubs and Single–A Myrtle Beach Pelicans. In 62 combined contests, he batted .192/.318/.305 with four home runs and 29 RBI. Spence returned to High–A South Bend in 2023, playing in 36 games and hitting .214/.346/.303 with one home run, 10 RBI, and two stolen bases.

On 29 March 2024, Spence was released by the Cubs organization.

=== Sioux Falls Canaries ===
On 2 May 2024, Spence signed with the Sioux Falls Canaries of the American Association of Professional Baseball. In 79 appearances for Sioux Falls, he batted .239/.365/.337 with five home runs, 34 RBI, and nine stolen bases.

=== Firefighters ===
In 2025 Spence signed to play with The Firefighters in the Banana Ball exhibition baseball league. His signature trick plays have included kicking the ball instead of throwing it.

== Personal life ==
Liam's two older brothers, Josh and Nic, played baseball for Central Arizona. Josh also played for the San Diego Padres of Major League Baseball.
