= Misael Siverio =

Cuban baseball player (born 1989)

- Pitcher
- Born: June 12, 1989 (age 37); Villa Clara, Cuba
- Bats: Left Throws: Left
- Stats at Baseball Reference

Misael Siverio (born June 12, 1989) is a Cuban former professional baseball pitcher.

== Professional career ==
Siverio played for Villa Clara in the Cuban National Series from 2007 to 2012. He defected from the Cuban national baseball team in 2013 when the team visited the United States to play in an exhibition against American college baseball players in Des Moines, Iowa. In response, Víctor Mesa, the manager of the Cuban team, said that Siverio was "not that great of a pitcher" who was with the team "because he's a left-hand thrower." On May 22, 2014, it was announced that Siverio would throw in front of MLB scouts in Tijuana, Mexico on June 10.

=== Seattle Mariners ===
Siverio signed a minor league contract with the Seattle Mariners organization on November 17, 2014. He pitched for the Jackson Generals of the Double–A Southern League in 2015, recording a 5-12 record and 4.35 ERA with 110 strikeouts in 26 appearances. On April 1, 2016, Siverio was released by the Mariners organization.

=== Sioux Falls Canaries ===
On April 29, 2016, Siverio signed with the Sioux Falls Canaries of the American Association of Independent Professional Baseball. He pitched in 10 games for the club, registering a 3-6 record and 6.28 ERA in 57 1/3 innings pitched.

=== Tigres de Quintana Roo ===
On May 31, 2017, Siverio signed with the Tigres de Quintana Roo of the Mexican League. In 12 games for the Tigres, Siverio pitched to a 4-5 record and 4.69 ERA in 63 1/3 innings of work.

=== West Virginia Power ===
On May 12, 2021, Siverio signed with the West Virginia Power of the Atlantic League of Professional Baseball. Siverio struggled to an 0-3 record and 10.59 ERA in 4 appearances for the Power before being released on June 22.

=== Milwaukee Milkmen ===
On June 25, 2021, Siverio signed with the Milwaukee Milkmen of the American Association of Professional Baseball.

=== Southern Maryland Blue Crabs ===
On August 13, 2021, Siverio was traded to the Southern Maryland Blue Crabs of the Atlantic League of Professional Baseball in exchange for a player to be named later. Siverio recorded a 6.30 ERA in 9 appearances for the Blue Crabs before he was released on September 28.
