= Kyle Schepel =

American professional baseball pitcher (born 1990)

- Pitcher
- Born: August 7, 1990 (age 35); Grand Rapids, Michigan
- Bats: Left Throws: Right

Kyle James Schepel (born August 7, 1990) is an American former professional baseball pitcher.

== Amateur career ==
Schepel was born in Grand Rapids, Michigan. He attended Grand Rapids Christian High School and then Grand Valley State University. During his freshman campaign at GVSU, he went 5–1 with a 2.15 ERA in 11 games. In his sophomore year, he was 6–2 with a 5.81 ERA in 15 games. In his junior season, he was 11–0 with a 2.57 ERA in 14 starts. In his senior season, he was 9–4 with a 2.75 ERA in 14 starts, striking out 94 batters in 78.2 innings. He went 31–7 overall and won the Great Lakes Intercollegiate Conference 'Pitcher of the Year Award' in 2011. He is also the university's career leader in victories, games started, strikeouts and innings pitched. He was a pre-season All-American in 2012.

== Professional career ==
=== Rockford RiverHawks ===
Schepel began his professional career in 2012 in the independent leagues, going 4–7 with a 3.68 ERA for the Rockford RiverHawks of the Frontier League.

=== Arizona Diamondbacks ===
On September 23, 2012, the Arizona Diamondbacks signed Schepel to a minor league contract. He was used as both a starting pitcher and relief pitcher during his two seasons in the Diamondbacks chain. He was 7–8 with a 5.40 ERA in 31 games for the Low–A Hillsboro Hops, Single–A South Bend Silver Hawks and High–A Visalia Rawhide in 2013. On April 23, he threw a seven-inning no-hitter against the Lansing Lugnuts for his first professional win and on August 31, he tossed a nine-inning no-hitter against the Boise Hawks. He had also flirted with a no-hitter in 2012. He was 4–4 with a 3.84 ERA in 52 relief appearances for the Silver Hawks and Rawhide in 2014. On March 30, 2015, Schepel was released by the Diamondbacks organization.

=== Seattle Mariners ===
Shortly after his Arizona release, Schepel signed on with the independent Frontier Greys. After a handful of games there, he signed a minor league contract with the Seattle Mariners on June 3. He pitched for the Single–A Clinton LumberKings, High–A Bakersfield Blaze and Triple–A Tacoma Rainiers that year. He was 1–3 with a 2.93 ERA in 29 games that year. In 2016, he completed his best season to date, tallying a 4–3 record with a 2.09 ERA in 43 appearances, with 75 strikeouts and a .164 batting average against in 43 total appearances between Bakersfield and the Double-A Jackson Generals. On November 7, 2016, Schepel elected free agency.

=== Washington Nationals ===
On December 9, 2016, Schepel signed a minor league contract with the Washington Nationals. He spent the 2017 season with the High–A Potomac Nationals and Double–A Harrisburg Senators. In 34 total appearances between the two affiliates, Schepel posted a 3.76 ERA with 65 strikeouts across 55.0 innings of work. He elected free agency following the season on November 7, 2017.

=== Sioux Falls Canaries ===
On February 28, 2018, Schepel signed with the Sioux Falls Canaries of the American Association of Professional Baseball. In 50 relief outings for the Canaries, he recorded a 3.28 ERA with 75 strikeouts and 14 saves in 57 2/3 innings of work. Schepel became a free agent following the season.
