= Dean Green (baseball) =

American baseball player

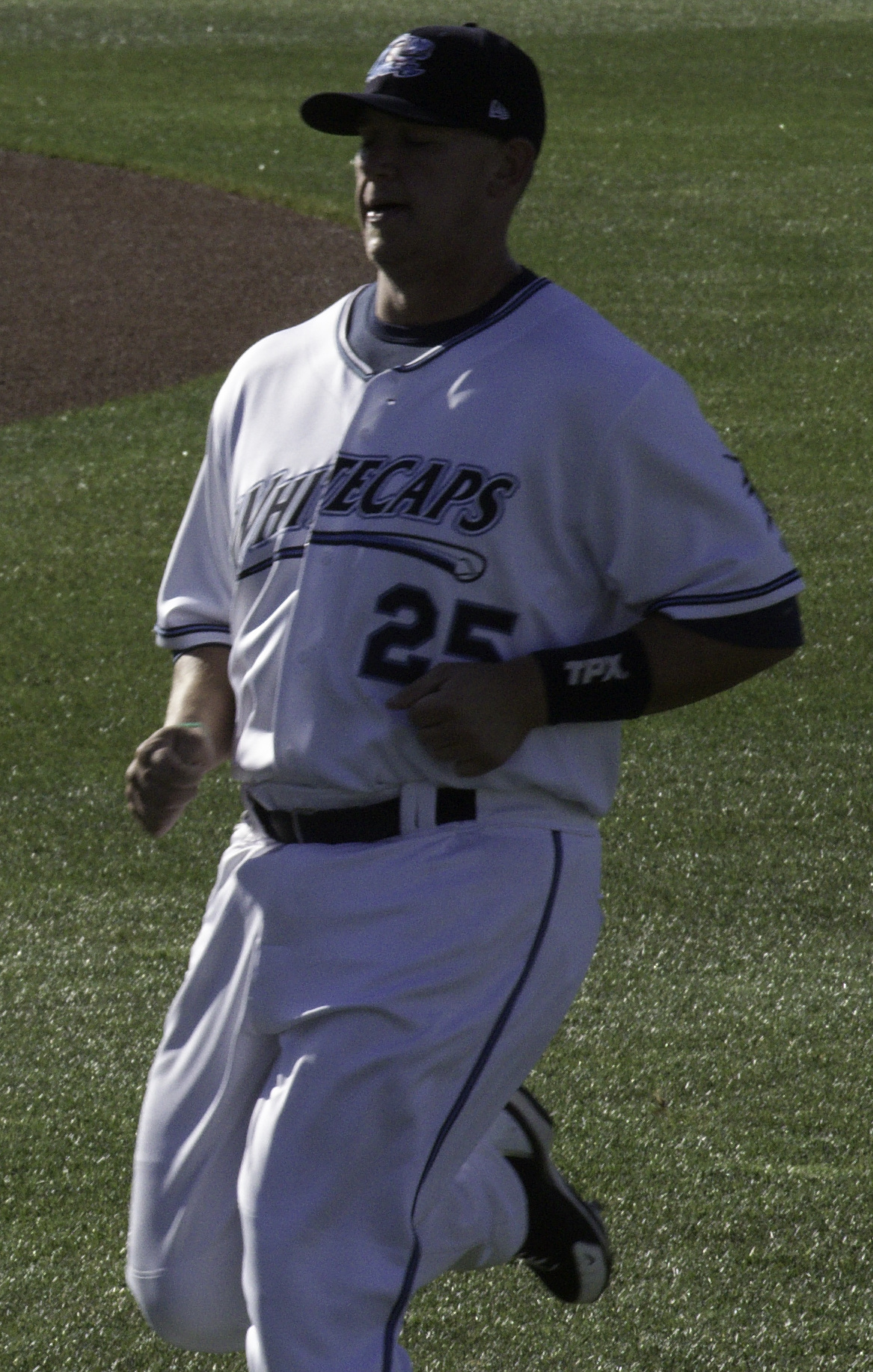
- Green with the West Michigan Whitecaps in 2012
- First baseman
- Born: June 30, 1989 (age 37); Tulsa, Oklahoma, U.S.
- Batted: Left Threw: Right

NPB debut
- June 4, 2017, for the Tokyo Yakult Swallows

Last NPB appearance
- July 9, 2017, for the Tokyo Yakult Swallows

NPB statistics
- Batting average: .194
- Home runs: 2
- Runs batted in: 8
- Hits: 14
- Stats at Baseball Reference

Teams
- Tokyo Yakult Swallows (2017)

Rodger Dean Green (born June 30, 1989) is an American former professional baseball first baseman. He played for the Tokyo Yakult Swallows of Nippon Professional Baseball's Central League in 2017.

== Career ==
=== Amateur career ===
Green attended Berryhill High School in Tulsa, Oklahoma. Green enrolled at Oklahoma State University–Stillwater and began his college baseball career for the Oklahoma State Cowboys. He transferred to Barry University in 2010, finishing his college baseball career with the Barry Buccaneers of NCAA Division II.

=== Professional career ===
The Detroit Tigers selected Green in the 11th round of the 2011 Major League Baseball draft. He played for the Erie SeaWolves of the Class AA Eastern League in 2014. Beginning the 2015 season with Erie, Green was named an All-Star and was promoted to the Toledo Mud Hens of the Class AAA International League. He began the 2016 season with Erie, receiving another midseason promotion to Toledo.

After the 2016 season, the Tigers sold Green's contract to the Tokyo Yakult Swallows of Nippon Professional Baseball's Central League. He played in 25 games for Yakult's main team and 59 games for the farm team, batting .194 with two home runs and eight RBIs for the farm team and .301 with 14 home runs and 45 RBIs for Yakult.

On February 6, 2018, Green signed with the New Jersey Jackals of the Can-Am League. On July 29, 2018, his contract was purchased by the Toros de Tijuana of the Mexican League. After only 8 recorded at bats, he was released on August 6, 2018. On August 16, 2018, Green signed with the Sioux City Explorers of the American Association. He was released on June 24, 2019. On July 2, 2019, Green signed with the Southern Maryland Blue Crabs of the Atlantic League of Professional Baseball. On March 5, 2020, he re-signed with the team for the 2020 season.

== Coaching career ==
During the offseason following the 2020 season, Green joined the coaching staff at Rogers State University.

== Personal life ==
Green has three sons born in 2018, 2021 and 2021. He is currently engaged to be married in the fall of 2025.
