= Lincoln Saltdogs =

Professional baseball team based in Lincoln, Nebraska

Logo
Cap insignia

Information
- League: American Association of Professional Baseball (2006–present) (West Division)
- Location: Lincoln, Nebraska
- Ballpark: Haymarket Park (2001-present)
- Founded: 2001
- League championships: 1: 2009
- Division championships: 2006 (both halves), 2007 (1st half), 2009 (second half), 2014, 2017
- Former league: Northern League (2001–2005)
- Colors: Navy, red, Vegas gold, white
- Mascot: Homer the Haymarket Hound
- Ownership: Lincoln Pro Baseball, Inc. (NEBCO)
- General manager: Shane Tritz
- Manager: James Frisbie
- Media: Lincoln Journal Star; KFOR (1240 AM)
- Website: saltdogs.com

The Lincoln Saltdogs are an independent professional baseball team based in Lincoln, Nebraska, in the United States. The Saltdogs are members of the American Association of Professional Baseball, an official Partner League of Major League Baseball. Since the 2001 season, the Saltdogs have played their home games at Haymarket Park, which they share with the Nebraska Cornhuskers.

== History ==
=== Origins ===
In 1993, Lincoln mayor Mike Johanns proposed a $2.24 million renovation of Sherman Field, located at 225 South Street, in conjunction with the submission of an application to the Northern League for an expansion team. However, projections for keno revenues intended to fund the stadium fell short and city councilman Curt Donaldson changed his vote in what had previously been a four-to-three decision in favor, eliminating the use of taxpayer funds as a possible means to make up the difference and effectively ending the project.

In mid-1999, year-long negotiations between Lincoln mayors Coleen Seng and Don Wesely, University of Nebraska–Lincoln chancellor James Moeser, and local businessman Jim Abel, chair and CEO of NEBCO, Inc., a firm with interests in the manufacture and distribution of construction materials, were finalized and announced to the public. The group arranged joint funding from the city of Lincoln, the University of Nebraska system, and NEBCO to construct a joint off-campus baseball-softball complex, encompassing replacements for the Cornhusker baseball team's aging Buck Beltzer Stadium and the Cornhusker softball team's NU Softball Complex. It was intended that the baseball stadium would also host a professional team. Lincoln's second proposal for a Northern League team received preliminary approval from the league's other team owners at a meeting on August 2, 1999, in Fargo, North Dakota, and final approval on October 8 at another meeting held in Schaumburg, Illinois. Ownership of the franchise, operating as Lincoln Pro Baseball, a subsidiary of NEBCO, was granted to Abel.

After an online six-month name-the-team contest that featured more than 1,000 entries, Abel narrowed the list down to five ("Locos," "Saltdogs," "Ringnecks," "Prairie Fire," and "Larks"). On August 30, 2000, Abel announced that the team would be called the "Saltdogs," referencing the fact that the team's new stadium would be located between Salt Creek and Interstate 180, to the west of the University of Nebraska–Lincoln's main campus. Although the name initially received mixed reviews from fans, Nebraska baseball coach Dave Van Horn was pleased. The team's costumed mascot, "Homer the Haymarket Hound," an anthropomorphic tan dog, was revealed in the second inning of the team's first home game on June 2, 2001.

The Northern League's Madison Black Wolf chose to cease operations after the 2000 season because of a history of poor attendance that caused the team to lose money in each of its five seasons and a failed relocation proposal to the Madison suburb of Fitchburg; the rights to the contracts of seven former Black Wolf players were acquired by the Saltdogs.

=== Northern League ===
==== Kash Beauchamp, Les Lancaster, and Tim Johnson (2001–08) ====
The Saltdogs were members of the Northern League from 2001 to 2005, compiling a regular-season record of 249–214 (.538) and a 7–10 playoff record.

Kash Beauchamp was the first manager in Saltdogs history, and the team won its first home game, defeating the Sioux City Explorers 7-6 before a crowd of 6,827 at Haymarket Park on June 2, 2001. On June 23, Saltdogs pitcher Clay Eason threw a complete game shutout of the Duluth-Superior Dukes in front of 7,979 fans; this attendance record would stand until 2023. Beauchamp's tenure would last only 42 games into the season before he was suspended by the team after being arrested on suspicion of domestic violence, later resigning. Pitcher Les Lancaster became interim manager, serving as a player-manager for the first ten days of his tenure before moving exclusively to the bench.

After the 2002 season, the Saltdogs decided to part ways with Lancaster because of a clash in managerial philosophies, hiring former Toronto Blue Jays manager Tim Johnson as his replacement. Lancaster guided Lincoln to a regular-season record of 86–53 (.619) and a postseason record of 6–7 in his two seasons. After the 2005 season, the Saltdogs, along with the St. Paul Saints, Sioux City Explorers, and Sioux Falls Canaries, left the Northern League to form the American Association.

=== American Association ===
The Saltdogs made the playoffs in each of their first two years in the American Association. In both 2006 and 2007, they finished with the league's best overall regular-season record, winning both the first-half and second-half North Division titles in 2006, and the first-half North Division title in 2007. Their 14-game winning streak in 2007 remains the longest in team history. The Saltdogs had the best overall record (272–204) of any team in the first five years of the American Association. After a frustrating 50-45 finish in 2008, Johnson stepped down as manager at the end of the season. In his six seasons with the Saltdogs, Johnson compiled a 314–252 (.555) regular-season record and a 2–9 postseason record.

==== Marty Scott, Chris Miyake (2009–12) ====
In November 2008, the team announced the hiring of Marty Scott as manager. Scott had won two Northern League titles with the St. Paul Saints in 1995 and 1996, and had managed the Triple-A New Orleans Zephyrs in 2008. The Saltdogs claimed their first American Association championship in 2009. Their overall regular-season record was 49–47, but they went 27–21 in the second half of the season to claim the second-half North Division title, advancing to the championship by defeating the first-half North Division champion Wichita Wingnuts in the division series, three games to two. The Saltdogs won the league title over the South Division champion Pensacola Pelicans three games to two, with game five decided by a 2–1 score at Pelican Park in Pensacola. Lincoln celebrated its 10th anniversary in 2010, and the team secured its fourth berth in the playoffs in the last five seasons. The Saltdogs finished with a 51–45 overall record, the seventh time in ten seasons Lincoln had reached 50 wins, and the ninth time in ten seasons with an above .500 finish. Although the Saltdogs did not win a division title, their overall record allowed them to qualify for the postseason via a wild card berth. Lincoln has earned four wild-card playoff berths in its history, with the first three (2001, 2002, and 2005) coming during the team's Northern League days. Following the 2011 season, Scott left the Saltdogs to become vice president of player development for the MLB's Miami Marlins. Over two seasons, Scott guided Lincoln to a 100–92 (.521) regular-season record, a 6–7 postseason record, and one league championship. Hitting coach Chris Miyake was promoted to manager for the 2012 season, but his contract was not renewed after a 41-59 finish.

==== Ken Oberkfell, Bobby Brown, and James Frisbie (2013–20) ====
In 2013, Ken Oberkfell became the manager of the Saltdogs. He resigned for family reasons after the 2015 season, and was replaced by hitting coach Bobby Brown. Oberkfell's three teams finished with a combined record of 137-163 (.456), with a 3-4 playoff record, reaching the league championship in 2014 where they were swept by the Wichita Wingnuts, three games to none. Bobby Brown led the Saltdogs to a 201-196 (.506) record in his four seasons, with one playoff appearance (a 3-1 series loss to the Winnipeg Goldeyes in 2014). The Saltdogs parted ways with Brown after a 40-59 finish in 2019. In November 2019, the Saltdogs hired James Frisbie as the team's eighth manager. Frisbie had accumulated five years of managerial experience in the defunct Central and South Coast Leagues, the Frontier League, and the American Association. However, Frisbie would not end up managing a game for the Saltdogs; because of the COVID-19 pandemic, the American Association played a condensed 2020 season with six teams, with Lincoln one of the teams that was placed on hiatus, and Frisbie was hired by the MLB's Detroit Tigers in March 2021 as a specialist batting coach.

==== Brett Jodie (2021–2025) ====
Brett Jodie was hired as the club's ninth manager in April 2021, and the Saltdogs celebrated their twentieth season. Jodie had spent thirteen seasons with the Somerset Patriots of the independent Atlantic League. The Patriots made the playoffs in six of his seven seasons as manager, and won the 2015 league championship. The Saltdogs returned to the diamond for 2021, and in late May, the Lincoln-Lancaster County Health Department lifted its 75 percent capacity restriction on Haymarket Park and stopped mandatory wear of face masks. However, attendance was down noticeably during the 2021 season when compared to previous years. In 2022, the Saltdogs qualified for the playoffs, but lost to the Kansas City Monarchs in the quarterfinals, two games to none. On June 30, 2023, the Saltdogs set a new single-game attendance record of 8,298 as they defeated the Sioux City Explorers 6-1, the first time that more than 8,000 fans attended a Saltdogs game at Haymarket Park. On July 18, 2025, the Saltdogs again set a new single-game attendance record, as 8,325 fans saw them defeat the Winnipeg Goldeyes 6-5 in eleven innings. On December 15, 2025, Jodie announced he would be stepping down as the Saltdogs' manager in order to be closer to his native South Carolina, as well as his wife and two daughters. In five seasons with the Saltdogs, Jodie compiled a regular-season record of 230-270 (.460) and had one playoff appearance, in 2022. On December 19, he was hired as the manager of the Southern Maryland Blue Crabs of the Atlantic League.

==== James Frisbie (second stint) ====
On January 9, 2026, the Saltdogs announced the rehiring of James Frisbie as manager. In addition to his previous independent league coaching experience, Frisbie spent 2021 and 2022 with the Detroit Tigers and 2023 through 2025 with the Washington Nationals as a utility coach and batting practice pitcher.

== Roster ==
Lincoln Saltdogs roster
Active roster	Coaching staff
Pitchers: 19 Harold Cortijo; 14 Graham Edwards; 20 Haden Erbe; 3 Jeferson Figueroa; 39 Gabriel Jaramillo; 8 Trey Jones; 1 Greg Loukinen; 25 Zac McCleve; 6 Foster Pace; 23 Ryan Rembisz; 26 David Shaw; 32 Tyler Stasiowski; 24 Chandler Woolridge; Catchers: 13 Ryan Grabosch; 10 Mason Minzey; 16 Jacob Morrow; Infielders: 41 Cary Arbolida; 27 Cael Chatham; 11 Jack Dragum; 9 Edwin Garcia ‡; 7 Calyn Halvorson; 17 Paul Myro; 4 Nick Shumpert; Outfielders: 2 Connor Bagnieski; 44 Tanner O’Tremba; 5 Cam Phelts; 15 Jairo Pomares	Manager: 26 James Frisbie; Coaches: 18 Mason Ross (pitching); 40 Kash Beauchamp (hitting); -- Matt Honerman (trainer); -- Ty Boardman (clubhouse manager); Disabled list; ‡ Inactive list; § Suspended list; Roster updated May 28, 2026 Transactions

== Notable alumni ==
- Kash Beauchamp (2001)
- Les Lancaster (2001)
- Kevin Mitchell (2001)
- Clayton Andrews (2003)
- Bubba Carpenter (2003)
- Mike Figga (2003)
- Francisco Matos (2003)
- Kevin Roberson (2003)
- Peter Rasmusen (2003)
- Pete Rose Jr. (2004)
- Rodney Myers (2005)
- Luis Lopez (2006)
- Chris Jakubauskas (2007)
- Dan Reichert (2007)
- Dusty Bergman (2008)
- Félix José (2008)
- Kit Pellow (2008)
- Jose Rodriguez (2008)
- Carlos Guevara (2009)
- Chris Britton (2010)
- Ángel Castro (2010)
- Blake Gailen (2011)
- Alex Maestri (2011)
- Tim Adleman (2012)
- D'Angelo Jiménez (2012)
- Salomón Manríquez (2012)
- A. J. Miller (2012)
- Mike Burns (2013)
- Joe Bisenius (2013–2014)
- Evan Reed (2016)
- Casey Crosby (2017)
- Lo Kuo-hua (2016)
- Tommy Mendonca (2017)
- Dashenko Ricardo (2017–2018)
- Tyler Herron (2018)
- Dan Johnson (2018)
- Joey Wagman (2018)
- Shairon Martis (2015–2019)
- Randolph Oduber (2017–2019)
- Vicente Campos (2019)
- José Ortega (2019)
- Nick Tepesch (2019)
- Curt Smith (2011, 2013, 2015–2019, 2021)
- Johnny Barbato (2021)
- David Vidal (2021)
- Brandon Cunniff (2022)
- Buddy Baumann (2022)
- Jason Rogers (2022–2023)
- David Holmberg (2023)
- Ian Oxnevad (2024–present)

== Season-by-season records ==
=== Northern League ===
Lincoln Saltdogs (2001–2005)
Season	Manager(s)	Regular season W–L	Win %	Division finish	Playoffs
2001	Kash Beauchamp, Les Lancaster	52–38	.578	3rd, Central	Won in semifinals vs. Sioux Falls Canaries 3–1; Lost league championship to Winnipeg Goldeyes 3–1
2002	Les Lancaster	55–36	.604	2nd, Central	Lost in semifinals to Winnipeg Goldeyes 3–2
2003	Tim Johnson	41–49	.456	3rd, West	Did not qualify
2004	Tim Johnson	49–47	.510	3rd, South	Did not qualify
2005	Tim Johnson	52–44	.542	1st, Central	Lost in semifinals to Fargo-Moorhead RedHawks 3–1
Totals (NL)		249–214	.538		7–10

=== American Association ===
Lincoln Saltdogs (2006–2025)
Season	Manager	Regular season W–L	Win %	Division finish	Playoffs
2006	Tim Johnson	65–31	.677	1st, North	Lost in semifinals to St. Paul Saints 3–1
2007	Tim Johnson	57–36	.613	1st, North	Lost in semifinals to St. Paul Saints 3–0
2008	Tim Johnson	50–45	.526	3rd, North	Did not qualify
2009	Marty Scott	49–47	.510	2nd, North	Won in semifinals vs. Wichita Wingnuts 3–2; Won league championship vs. Pensacola Pelicans 3–2
2010	Marty Scott	51–45	.440	2nd, North	Lost in semifinals to Sioux Falls Canaries 3–0
2011	Marty Scott	51–48	.515	3rd, Central	Did not qualify
2012	Chris Miyake	41–59	.410	5th, Central	Did not qualify
2013	Ken Oberkfell	49–51	.490	3rd, Central	Did not qualify
2014	Ken Oberkfell	54–46	.540	1st, Central	Won in semifinals vs. Winnipeg Goldeyes 3–1; Lost league championship to Wichita Wingnuts 3–0
2015	Ken Oberkfell	34–66	.340	4th, Central	Did not qualify
2016	Bobby Brown	52–48	.520	3rd, Central	Did not qualify
2017	Bobby Brown	58–41	.586	1st, Central	Lost in semifinals to Winnipeg Goldeyes 3–1
2018	Bobby Brown	51–48	.515	4th, South	Did not qualify
2019	Bobby Brown	40–59	.404	4th, South	Did not qualify
2020	Season cancelled due to COVID-19 pandemic				
2021	Brett Jodie	53–47	.530	4th, South	Did not qualify
2022	Brett Jodie	49-51	.490	4th, West	Lost in quarterfinals to Kansas City Monarchs 2-0
2023	Brett Jodie	48-52	.480	5th, West	Did not qualify
2024	Brett Jodie	38-62	.380	6th, West	Did not qualify
2025	Brett Jodie	42-58	.420	5th, West	Did not qualify
2026	James Frisbie	44-56	.440	6th, West	Did not qualify
Totals (AA)		976–996	.495		11–22

== Average attendance ==
Lincoln Saltdogs average attendance (2001–2026)
Season	Home dates	Total attendance	Average per game	Change from previous year
2001	45	240,022	5,334	
2002	51	247,471	4,852	-482
2003	44	214,839	4,883	+31
2004	47	204,354	4,348	-535
2005	48	207,744	4,328	-20
2006	47	190,873	4,061	-267
2007	48	193,040	4,022	-39
2008	46	182,852	3,975	-47
2009	47	172,445	3,669	-306
2010	48	163,676	3,400	-269
2011	48	157,647	3,284	-116
2012	48	158,258	3,297	+13
2013	49	177,982	3,632	+335
2014	47	166,503	3,543	-89
2015	50	171,605	3,432	-111
2016	47	169,750	3,612	+180
2017	51	172,712	3,387	-225
2018	48	160,124	3,336	-51
2019	49	168,394	3,437	+101
2021	54	149,204	2,763	-674
2022	47	144,494	3,074	+311
2023	49	151,265	3,087	+13
2024	48	162,132	3,378	+291
2025	48	155,837	3,247	-131
2026	48	141,810	2,954	-293
