= Kamine Stadium =

College baseball stadium in Pennsylvania, U.S.

Hilton Rahn '51 Field at Kamine Stadium
- Kamine Stadium
- Interactive map of Hilton Rahn '51 Field at Kamine Stadium
- Location: 3412 Sullivan Trail; Metzgar Fields Athletic Complex; Forks Township, Pennsylvania, 18042 U.S.
- Coordinates: 40.7373°N 75.2384°W
- Capacity: 500
- Surface: Natural Grass
- Field size: Left: 332 ft (101 m); Center: 403 ft (123 m); Right: 335 ft (102 m)

Construction
- Groundbreaking: 1968
- Opened: 1970
- Renovated: 2007
- Expanded: 2003

Tenant
- Lafayette Leopards baseball

Website
- Lafayette Baseball

Hilton Rahn '51 Field at Kamine Stadium is a college baseball stadium in the Metzgar Fields Athletic Complex in Forks Township, Pennsylvania. It hosts the Lafayette Leopards of the Patriot League.

The stadium is completely composed of natural grass with a dirt infield and dirt base paths. A 15-foot crushed rock warning track is in front of an eight-foot high outfield fence.

== Renovations ==
Kamine Stadium has undergone two renovations since the turn of the century to better suit the Lafayette baseball program.

=== 2003 Renovation ===
The baseball field was transformed from a simple baseball diamond to a baseball stadium. 500 permanent chairback seats were installed along with a press box to meet the needs for television, radio, newspaper, and public address announcers. Both the home and away dugouts were expanded by 20 feet.

=== 2007 Renovation ===
The 2007 renovation was centered on the playing surface. An irrigation system was added, new sod and infield dirt was installed, and the pitcher's mound and home plate areas were rebuilt.

== See also ==
- List of NCAA Division I baseball venues
