= Ian Oxnevad =

American baseball player (born 1996)

- Pitcher
- Born: October 3, 1996 (age 30); Shoreline, Washington, U.S.
- Bats: Right Throws: Left
- Stats at Baseball Reference

Ian Eric Oxnevad (born October 3, 1996) is an American former professional baseball pitcher.

== Amateur career ==
Oxnevad attended Shorewood High School in Shoreline, Washington. As a senior in 2015, he boasted an 11–0 record with a 0.53 ERA, giving up just six runs all season, helping lead Shorewood to the 3A state championship. Following the season, he was named The Herald's baseball player of the year. He committed to play college baseball at Oregon State University. After his senior season, he was selected by the St. Louis Cardinals in the eighth round of the 2015 Major League Baseball draft and signed for $500,000, forgoing his commitment to Oregon State.

== Professional career ==
=== St. Louis Cardinals ===
Oxnevad made his professional debut with the Rookie-level Gulf Coast League Cardinals, pitching to a 1–1 record with a 2.42 ERA in eight games (seven starts). Oxnevad spent 2016 with the Johnson City Cardinals of the rookie-level Appalachian League, going 5–3 with a 3.38 ERA in 12 starts, and 2017 with the Peoria Chiefs of the Single–A Midwest League, compiling a 3–10 record with a 4.09 ERA in 24 games (23 starts). In 2018, he pitched for the Palm Beach Cardinals of the High–A Florida State League where he was 7–6 with a 4.79 ERA in 22 games (18 starts). He missed all of 2019 after undergoing surgery on his elbow.

Oxnevad did not play in a game in 2020 due to the cancellation of the minor league season because of the COVID-19 pandemic. He missed all of the 2021 season due to injury. He elected free agency after the year on November 7, 2021.

=== Boise Hawks ===
On July 20, 2023, Oxnevad signed with the Boise Hawks of the Pioneer League. In 7 games (6 starts), he struggled to a 7.50 ERA with 22 strikeouts across 30 innings of work. On October 3, Oxnevad cleared waivers and became a free agent.

=== Lincoln Saltdogs ===
On June 20, 2024, Oxnevad signed with the Lincoln Saltdogs of the American Association of Professional Baseball.
