= Jordan Smith (outfielder) =

- Outfielder
- Born: July 5, 1990 (age 36); Willmar, Minnesota
- Bats: Left Throws: Right
- Stats at Baseball Reference

Teams
- Cleveland Indians (2011–2017, 2019)

Jordan Ray Smith (born July 5, 1990) is an American former professional baseball outfielder who played in the minor leagues for the Cleveland Indians.

== Career ==
Smith was born in Willmar, Minnesota and attended Willmar High School and St. Cloud State University. In 2011, he played collegiate summer baseball with the Yarmouth–Dennis Red Sox of the Cape Cod Baseball League, and was selected by the Cleveland Indians in the 9th round of the 2011 Major League Baseball draft.

=== Cleveland Indians ===
Smith began his professional career with a .300 batting average and .403 on-base percentage his first professional season and followed that with a .316 batting average in 2012. He also played for Toros del Este in the Dominican Professional Baseball League In 2013, he stole 18 bases and in 2014, he was selected to play in the Arizona Fall League with the Peoria Javelinas. Smith was a New York-Penn League Mid-Season All-Star in 2011 and a MiLB.com Organization All-Star in 2012 and 2013.

He stole 18 bases in 2015 and 17 bases in 2016. He reached Triple A for the first time in 2016. Going into that year, he was ranked one of the Indians' top prospects. In 2017, Smith played in 97 games split between the Double–A Akron RubberDucks and Triple–A Columbus Clippers, batting a cumulative .212/.278/.280 with 3 home runs and 24 RBI. He elected free agency following the season on November 6, 2017.

=== St. Paul Saints ===
On February 26, 2018, Smith signed with the St. Paul Saints of the American Association of Professional Baseball. He was waived on June 5.

=== Sioux Falls Canaries ===
On June 5, 2018, Smith was claimed off waivers by the Sioux Falls Canaries.

=== Cleveland Indians (second stint) ===
On January 18, 2019, Smith's contract was sold to the Cleveland Indians organization. However, he did not appear in a game for the organization and elected free agency following the season on November 4.

== Post-playing career ==
In December 2021, Smith returned to St. Cloud State University, graduating with a Bachelor of Elective Studies degree.

=== Cleveland Guardians ===
Smith has coached in the Cleveland Guardians minor league system. He was the bench coach of the Lake County Captains for the 2019 and 2021 baseball seasons. In 2022, he was the manager for the Arizona Complex League Guardians. He managed the Lynchburg Hillcats in 2023, 2024 and led the team to a championship in 2025.

=== Minnesota Twins ===
In 2026, Smith was named as manager for the Fort Myers Mighty Mussels the Single-A affiliate of the Minnesota Twins.
