= Josh Spence =

Australian baseball player (born 1988)

- Pitcher
- Born: 22 January 1988 (age 37); Geelong, Victoria, Australia
- Batted: Left Threw: Left

MLB debut
- 24 June, 2011, for the San Diego Padres

Last MLB appearance
- 11 May, 2012, for the San Diego Padres

MLB statistics
- Win–loss record: 0–3
- Earned run average: 3.15
- Strikeouts: 41
- Stats at Baseball Reference

Teams
- San Diego Padres (2011–2012)

Joshua Patrick William Spence (born 22 January 1988) is an Australian former professional baseball pitcher. He pitched in Major League Baseball (MLB) for the San Diego Padres.

== Playing career ==
Spence enrolled at Central Arizona College, and played for their baseball team in 2007 and 2008. He was selected in 25th round of the 2008 draft by the Arizona Diamondbacks but did not sign. He transferred to Arizona State University to play for the Sun Devils for the 2009 season going 10–1 with a 2.37 ERA, where he joined Mike Leake and Seth Blair in the Sun Devils' starting rotation. He was selected in the 3rd round of the 2009 draft by the Los Angeles Angels of Anaheim, but did not sign. He sat out the 2010 ASU season with an undetermined injury. After the 2010 season, he played collegiate summer baseball with the Cotuit Kettleers of the Cape Cod Baseball League.

=== San Diego Padres ===
Spence was drafted by the San Diego Padres in the ninth round, with the 274th overall selection, of the 2010 Major League Baseball draft, and signed with them for a $100,000 bonus.

He was called up by San Diego on 21 June 2011, after they designated Luis Durango for assignment to make room for him on the 40-man roster. Spence made his debut on 25 June in the top of the ninth inning against the Atlanta Braves; he faced three All-Stars in Jason Heyward, Chipper Jones, and Brian McCann, setting them down in order. Spence became the 29th Australian to reach the Majors and first pitcher since Rich Thompson debuted for the Angels in 2007.

Spence made 11 appearances for San Diego in 2012, recording a 4.35 ERA with 10 strikeouts across 10 1/3 innings pitched. On November 2, 2012, Spence was designated for assignment by the Padres.

=== New York Yankees ===
The New York Yankees claimed Spence off waivers on 6 November 2012. He was designated for assignment by the Yankees on 14 December, following the signing of Kevin Youkilis. Spence cleared waivers and was sent outright to the Triple-A Scranton/Wilkes-Barre Yankees on 18 December. In 33 appearances for Scranton in 2013, he compiled a 3.98 ERA with 41 strikeouts over 43 innings of work. Spence was released by the Yankees organization on 3 August 2013.

=== Miami Marlins ===
On 29 December 2013, Spence signed a minor league contract with the Miami Marlins. On 1 April 2014, he was assigned to Triple-A New Orleans Zephyrs, for whom he posted a 3.97 ERA with 12 strikeouts across 11 appearances out of the bullpen. Spence was released by the Marlins organization on 20 May.

=== Amarillo Sox ===
Spence signed with the Amarillo Sox of the American Association of Independent Professional Baseball following his release. In 3 starts for the Sox, he struggled to an 18.69 ERA with 3 strikeouts across 4 1/3 innings pitched.

=== Windy City ThunderBolts ===
Spence finished the 2014 season with the Windy City ThunderBolts of the Frontier League. In 14 starts for the team, he registered a 1-10 record and 5.23 ERA with 58 strikeouts across 75 2/3 innings pitched.

== Coaching career ==
=== San Diego Padres ===
In 2023, Spence was hired as the pitching coach for the San Diego Padres short season affiliate

=== Milwaukee Brewers ===
In 2024, Spence was hired as the pitching coach for the Wisconsin Timber Rattlers, the High-A affiliate of the Milwaukee Brewers. On 5 February 2025, Spence was announced as the pitching coach for Milwaukee's Double-A affiliate, the Biloxi Shuckers.

== Pitching style ==
Spence is a finesse pitcher, relying on pitch location and movement rather than overpowering speed. His two main pitches are a sinker averaging about 84 mph and a slider averaging 78. He also has a changeup at 76-77 mph that he uses often against right-handed hitters.

== Personal life ==
Spence's brother, Liam, played college baseball at Tennessee and was selected by the Chicago Cubs in the fifth round of the 2021 Major League Baseball draft. Their middle brother, Nic, played baseball at Cincinnati.
