= Lafayette Leopards baseball =

- 2026 Lafayette Leopards baseball team
- Founded: 1865; 161 years ago
- University: Lafayette College
- Head coach: A. J. Miller (4th season)
- Conference: Patriot
- Location: Easton, Pennsylvania
- Home stadium: Hilton Rahn '51 Field at Kamine Stadium (capacity: 500)
- Nickname: Leopards
- Colors: Maroon and white

College World Series appearances
- 1953, 1954, 1958, 1965

NCAA tournament appearances
- 1948, 1953, 1954, 1955, 1957, 1958, 1965, 1966, 1990, 2007

Conference tournament champions
- 2007

Conference regular season champions
- 1990 (ECC), 2007

The Lafayette Leopards baseball team represents Lafayette College in NCAA Division I college baseball. The team participates in the Patriot League. They are currently coached by Allen J. Miller. They play home games in Hilton Rahn '51 Field at Kamine Stadium. The Leopards have advanced to the College World Series four times. Lafayette has also qualified for the NCAA tournament ten times, but only twice since 1966.

== Facilities ==
Kamine Stadium is the home of Lafayette baseball. The stadium was renovated in 2003, establishing permanent seating and a permanent press box. It is a natural grass field with an official capacity of 500.

== History ==
Baseball is the oldest sport at the college, with a club team competing on a College Hill since March 1860. The team's first official game was a 44–11 win on November 8, 1865, against amateurs from Easton. The first recorded intercollegiate match was a 45–45 tie in a baseball game against Lehigh in October 1869, and its first win against Lehigh 31–24 shortly thereafter.

Aside from its traditional Ivy League and local rivals, Lafayette developed a rivalry with North Carolina and South Carolina in the late 19th and early 20th century. Games were played on March Field, and were later played at Fisher Stadium. Once the Metzgar Athletic Complex was built in the late 1960s, the team moved its field to what is now known as Kamine Stadium.

Lafayette has made four appearances in the College World Series in the 1950s and 1960s, the final round of the NCAA Division I Baseball Championship. Coached by former major leaguer Charlie Gelbert, the Leopards made it the semi-finals in 1953 before bowing to the University of Texas, finishing third; in 2016, the 1953 team was inducted into the athletic Hall of Fame. Lafayette eliminated Stanford and Boston College, with their only losses coming against Texas. Lafayette did not win a game in its other trips in 1954, 1958, and 1965.

Lafayette won the East Coast Conference in 1990 and Patriot League title 2007 to earn a trip to the NCAA Regionals.

Notable former Lafayette baseball players include Major League Baseball (MLB) manager Joe Maddon and MLB All-Star David Bednar.

== Tournament appearances ==
- 1948: Lafayette made its first NCAA tournament appearance, going 2–2 in the Eastern Playoff played in Winston-Salem, North Carolina. The Leopards defeated Illinois 9–6 but lost to Yale 11–2 to drop to the loser's bracket. Lafayette beat North Carolina 5–2 to advance to the final, but fell one run and one win short of the College World Series with a 4–3 loss to Yale.
- 1953: After a 17–4–3 regular season, Lafayette was one of the eight selected teams to participate in the 1953 College World Series. The Leopards finished 3–2 in the tournament, a third-place finish for the best in school history. Lafayette opened up play with a 6–2 defeat of Colorado State before being sent to the loser's bracket with a 7–2 loss to Texas. Lafayette advanced to the semi-finals with a 4–3 win over Stanford. The Leopards eliminated Boston College with a 2–1 victory before being eliminated by eventual runner-up, Texas.
- 1954: Lafayette went 2–0 in the four-team District 2 regional, defeating Villanova 4–3 and St. John's (NY) 9–0 to advance to the College World Series. The Leopards were eliminated immediately with two close losses, 5–3 to Missouri and 4–2 to Oklahoma A&M.
- 1955: Lafayette was eliminated with a 5–0 loss to Ithaca in the District 2 Regional in Allentown, Pennsylvania.
- 1957: Lafayette was eliminated with an 8–3 loss to St. John's in the District 2 Regional in Brooklyn, New York.
- 1958: Lafayette went 2–0 in the four-team District 2 regional, defeating Penn State 9–1 and NYU 5–1 to advance to the College World Series. The Leopards were eliminated after two straight losses, losing to Colorado State 10–5 and Western Michigan 4–3.
- 1965: The Leopards recorded a pair of one-run victories in the District 2 regional in Princeton, New Jersey to advance to the College World Series. Lafayette defeated Pittsburgh 4–3 and Princeton 5–4. At the CWS, the Leopards once again exited with two opening losses, one to eventual national champion Arizona State 14–1, and another to Connecticut 6–4.
- 1966: Lafayette returned to the District 2 regional in Princeton, New Jersey where they played four games, finishing 2–2. The Leopards beat Colgate 15–0, lost to St. John's 2–0, eliminated Rutgers with a 4–3 win, and were eliminated by St. John's with an 8–3 defeat.
- 1990: Lafayette was the No. 6 seed in the South II Regional in Starkville, Mississippi where they paired up with No. 1 regional seed Florida State and lost 7–2. The Leopards were eliminated by the regional's No. 5 seed, BYU, losing 13–3.
- 2007: The Leopards were the No. 4 seed in the Charlottesville Regional. Lafayette paired up with No. 1-seeded Virginia where they lost 5–1. They were eliminated by the regional's No. 2 seed, Rutgers, after an 11–10 loss. No. 3-seeded Oregon State was the other team in the Charlottesville Regional, who went on to win the 2007 National Championship.

== Major Leaguers ==
The Leopards have sent 14 players to the Major Leagues. 16 Lafayette players have been drafted in the Major League Baseball draft.

Player	Years at Lafayette	Years in MLB	Position	Clubs
George Barclay	1896–98	1902–05	OF	St. Louis Cardinals, Boston Beaneaters
David Bednar	2014–16	2019–current	P	San Diego Padres, Pittsburgh Pirates, New York Yankees
Charlie Berry	1922–25	1925–38	C	Philadelphia Athletics, Boston Red Sox, Chicago White Sox
Jake Bloss	2020–22	2024	P	Houston Astros
Ben Demott	1908–10	1910–11	P, OF	Cleveland Naps
Mike Gazella	1920–23	1923–28	IF	New York Yankees
Frank Grube	1924–30	1931–41	C	Chicago White Sox, St. Louis Browns
Ty Helfrich	1910–15	1915	2B	Brooklyn Tip-Tops
Les Hennessy	1912–13	1913	2B	Detroit Tigers
Frank Hiller	1939–42	1946–53	P	New York Yankees, Chicago Cubs, Cincinnati Reds, New York Giants
Lep Long	1907–11	1911	P	Philadelphia Athletics
Jeff Mutis	1986–88	1991–94	P	Cleveland Indians, Florida Marlins
Fritz Scheeren	1913–14	1914–15	OF	Pittsburgh Pirates
Dick Wright	1909–15	1915	C	Brooklyn Tip-Tops

=== Other Notables ===
- Joe Maddon played catcher and outfielder and played four years of Minor League Baseball in the California Angels organization. Maddon has been coaching and managing in professional baseball since 1981 and in the major leagues since 1996.
- The Class Clown of Lafayette College is currently on the Lafayette baseball team, playing for Allen J. Miller.

== See also ==
- List of NCAA Division I baseball programs
