= Laredo Lemurs =

Former professional baseball team based in Texas

Logo
Cap insignia

Information
- League: American Association (2012–2016) (South Division)
- Location: Laredo, Texas
- Ballpark: Uni-Trade Stadium
- Founded: 2011
- Folded: 2017
- League championships: 2015
- Colors: Black, gold, silver, white
- Ownership: Arianna Torres
- Manager: Pete Incaviglia
- Website: www.laredolemurs.com

The Laredo Lemurs were a professional baseball team based in Laredo, Texas, that played in the independent American Association from 2012 to 2016. The team played their home games at the Uni-Trade Stadium in Laredo, replacing the Laredo Broncos of United League Baseball. The team withdrew from the league prior to the start of the 2017 season.

== History ==
Until the 2012 season, the team was located in Shreveport, Louisiana, and was known as the Shreveport-Bossier Captains. In late 2011, the franchise announced its move to Laredo, and the team was renamed. Media coverage suggested that the move was motivated by a deteriorating ballpark and the "inability of the local market to support professional baseball."

In September 2013, the Lemurs' Tano Tijerina, a former minor-league pitcher in the Milwaukee Brewers' system, and the incoming County Judge for Webb County, was the starting pitcher in the inaugural "Family Chevrolet Sister Cities Baseball Classic" at Uni-Trade Stadium.

On May 3, 2017, the Lemurs announced that they would be withdrawing from the American Association and would not operate a team in 2017.

The franchise did not return in any capacity and was subsequently replaced in 2018 by the bi-national Tecolotes de los Dos Laredos of the Mexican League.

== Season-by-season record ==
Laredo Lemurs
Season	Record	Win %	Finish	Playoffs
2012	54–46	.540	1st in South Division	Lost first round to Wichita Wingnuts 0–3
2013	52–47	.525	2nd in South Division	Did not qualify for playoffs
2014	58–42	.580	2nd in South Division	Lost to Wichita Wingnuts 1–3
2015	57–43	.570	2nd in South Division	League Champions, 3–1
2016	57–42	.576	2nd in South Division	Did not qualify for playoffs
Totals	278–220	.553		4–7

== Playoffs ==
- 2012 season: Lost to Wichita 3–0 in semifinals.
- 2013 season: Lost to Wichita 3–1 in semifinals.
- 2015 season: Defeated Wichita 3–2 in semifinals; defeated Sioux City 3–1 to win championship.
