= Jairo Pomares =

Cuban baseball player (born 2000)

Lincoln Saltdogs – No. 15
- Outfielder
- Born: August 4, 2000 (age 25); Sancti Spíritus, Cuba
- Bats: Left Throws: Right

Jairo Jeffry Pomares (born August 4, 2000) is a Cuban professional baseball outfielder for the Lincoln Saltdogs of the American Association of Professional Baseball.

== Early life ==
Pomares grew up in Trinidad, Sancti Spíritus, Cuba, to Yaremis and Jordani Pomares. He has a younger brother, Dairon.

In 2016, Pomares was a student at the sports institute EIDE Lino Salabarría Pupo when he decided to leave Cuba with Andy Pages, who had arranged to be spirited off the island, traveling through Guyana, Curaçao, and Haiti, before crossing into the Dominican Republic, in hopes of getting signed by Major League Baseball (MLB). A year later, his parents left their hotel jobs in Cuba and, with his brother, made their own risky journey to join Pages in the Dominican Republic.

== Career ==
=== San Francisco Giants ===
On July 2, 2018, Pomares signed with the San Francisco Giants as an international free agent for $975,500.

Pomares made his professional debut in 2019 with the Rookie-level Arizona League Giants and was promoted to the Salem-Keizer Volcanoes of the Low-A Northwest League during the season. Over 51 games between both affiliates, Pomares slashed .324/.362/.465 with three home runs and 37 RBI in 213 at-bats, playing primarily in right field. He did not play in a game in 2020 due to the cancellation of the minor league season because of the COVID-19 pandemic.

Pomares missed the first six weeks of the 2021 season while recovering from back surgery, but eventually began play with the San Jose Giants of the Low-A West in June, playing primarily in right field. His .694 slugging percentage led the Low-A West. He was promoted to the Eugene Emeralds of the High-A West in August, playing in left field. Over 77 games with the two affiliates, Pomares compiled a slash line of .334/.378/.629 with 20 home runs, 59 RBI, and 27 doubles across 302 at-bats.

Pomares returned to Eugene for the 2022 season, ultimately playing in 95 games and hitting .254/.330/.438 with 14 home runs and 59 RBI, while playing primarily left field. Playing for the rookie-level Arizona Complex League Giants, he was 8-for-15, with three doubles and three home runs. Pomares missed almost the entire 2023 season due to injury, making nine rehab appearances for the ACL Giants.

Pomares made 82 appearances for the Double-A Richmond Flying Squirrels during the 2024 season, batting .238/.280/.434 with 12 home runs, 47 RBI, and nine stolen bases. He returned to Richmond in 2025, hitting .209/.268/.352 with nine home runs, 34 RBI, and nine stolen bases over 76 games. Pomares was released by the Giants organization on July 14, 2025.

=== Lincoln Saltdogs ===
On March 19, 2026, Pomares signed with the Lincoln Saltdogs of the American Association of Professional Baseball.
