= Ángel Chávez =

Panamanian baseball player (born 1981)

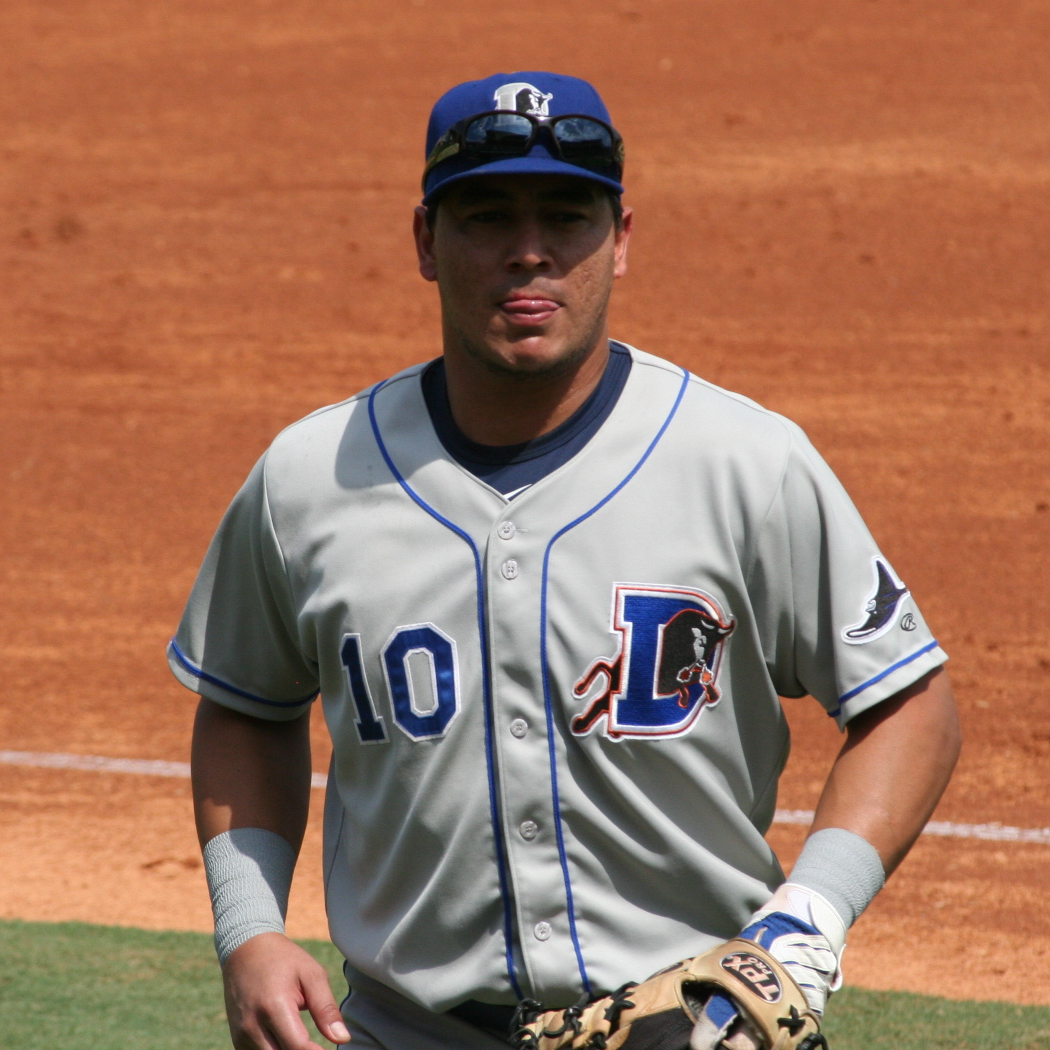
- Chávez with the Durham Bulls in 2010
- Infielder
- Born: July 22, 1981 (age 45); David, Chiriquí, Panama
- Batted: Right Threw: Right

MLB debut
- August 30, 2005, for the San Francisco Giants

Last MLB appearance
- October 5, 2005, for the San Francisco Giants

MLB statistics
- Batting average: .263
- Home runs: 0
- Runs batted in: 1
- Stats at Baseball Reference

Teams
- San Francisco Giants (2005)

Ángel Aristedes Chávez (born July 22, 1981) is a Panamanian professional baseball infielder. He made his Major League Baseball debut as an infielder with a late-season call up in 2005 for the San Francisco Giants. He has compiled a .269 career average with 74 home runs, 478 RBI and 98 stolen bases (in 137 attempts), in 936 minor league contests. He originally signed with the San Francisco Giants as a non-drafted free agent on October 30, 1998. He was born in David, Chiriquí, Panama.

== Career ==
=== San Francisco Giants ===
Chávez enjoyed a year at the minor league level in 2005, before having his contract purchased by the Giants on August 30. He made a big league debut that night versus the Colorado Rockies, starting at shortstop for ailing Omar Vizquel. He played in 10 games (4 starts - 3 at shortstop, 1 at second base) with the Giants, going 5-for-19 (.263) with a double. Despite missing the final 2 weeks of the minor league season, he ranked 5th among all Giants farmhands with a career-high 83 RBI in a combined 119 games. He batted .282 with 19 doubles, 4 tries and a career-high 16 home runs.

=== New York Yankees ===
Chávez was invited to spring training by the New York Yankees on January 12, 2007, but did not make the team and was not called up to the majors during the season. Chávez played 114 games for the Yankees Triple-A team, the Scranton/Wilkes-Barre Yankees, batting .291 and driving in 66 runs.

=== Los Angeles Dodgers ===
On December 12, 2007, Chávez signed a minor league contract with an invitation to spring training with the Los Angeles Dodgers. On March 31, 2008, his contract was purchased by the Dodgers. He began the season on the Dodgers opening day roster, but did not play in a game with them before he was designated for assignment. Chávez cleared waivers and was assigned to play for the Dodgers Triple-A team, the Las Vegas 51s. He became a free agent at the end of the season.

=== Boston Red Sox ===
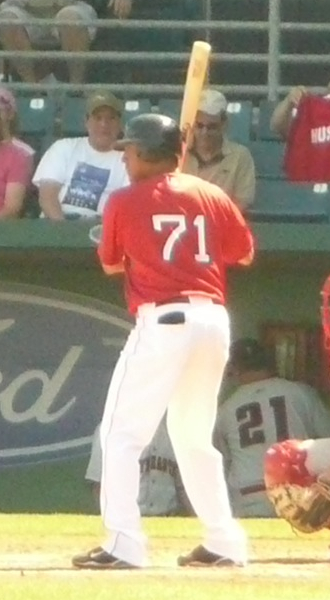
Chávez as a non-roster invitee of the Boston Red Sox in 2009 spring training

In January 2009, Chávez signed a minor league contract with the Boston Red Sox.

=== Tampa Bay Rays ===
In February 2010, Chávez signed a minor league contract with the Tampa Bay Rays.

=== Bridgeport Bluefish ===
In April 2011, Chávez signed an independent league contract with the Bridgeport Bluefish.

=== Bocas Del Toro ===
In February 2012, Chávez signed with Panama semi-professional league team Bocas and the team went on to win the National Championship.

=== Vaqueros Laguna ===
In May 2012, after finishing in Panama, Chávez signed a contract with the Vaqueros in Torreón, Mexico.

=== Chiriquí ===
In 2013, Chávez played for his native province of Chiriquí in the Panama semi-professional league, winning the National Championship for a second straight year.

=== Sioux Falls Canaries ===
Chávez signed with the Sioux Falls Canaries of the American Association of Independent Professional Baseball and played for them during the 2015 season.
