= David Vidal (baseball) =

Puerto Rican baseball player (born 1989)

- Third baseman
- Born: October 23, 1989 (age 36); San Juan, Puerto Rico
- Bats: Right Throws: Right
- Stats at Baseball Reference

David Javier Vidal (born October 23, 1989) is a Puerto Rican former professional baseball third baseman. He was chosen in the 8th round of the 2010 Major League Baseball draft, 247th overall by the Cincinnati Reds.

== Career ==
=== Cincinnati Reds ===
Vidal was selected in the 8th round of the 2010 Major League Baseball draft, 247th overall by the Cincinnati Reds. He was assigned to the Billings Mustangs to begin his professional career. He split his first professional season between Billings, the rookie ball AZL Reds, and the Single-A Dayton Dragons, accumulating a .267/.338/.460 batting line between the three clubs. In 2011, Vidal spent the season in Dayton, batting .280/.350/.498 with 20 home runs and 85 RBI in 127 games. He split the 2012 season between the High-A Bakersfield Blaze and the Double-A Pensacola Blue Wahoos, slashing .243/.311/.428 in 132 games between the two teams. He split the next season between Pensacola and Bakersfield as well, batting a cumulative .218/.291/.305 in 106 games. He was assigned to Bakersfield for the 2014 season, but hit .260 with 4 home runs before he was released on August 6, 2014.

=== Somerset Patriots ===
Vidal spent the 2015 season with the Somerset Patriots of the Atlantic League of Professional Baseball. In 2015, Vidal batted .259/.328/.395 in 124 games for the club. He re-signed with Somerset in 2016 and batted .320/.413/.633 with 26 home runs and 62 RBI. He became a free agent following the 2016 season.

=== Miami Marlins ===
On October 27, 2016, Vidal signed a minor league contract with the Miami Marlins. Vidal played for the Jacksonville Suns, New Orleans Baby Cakes, and Jacksonville Jumbo Shrimp in the minor leagues for the Marlins before he was released by the organization on September 11, 2017.

=== Somerset Patriots (second stint) ===
On September 11, 2017, the same day as his release from the Marlins, Vidal signed with the Somerset Patriots of the Atlantic League of Professional Baseball. He appeared in 5 games for the team before the end of the season and elected free agency after the year.

=== Diablos Rojos del México ===
On January 25, 2018, Vidal signed with the Diablos Rojos del México of the Mexican Baseball League. Vidal played the 2018 and 2019 seasons for the Diablos. Vidal did not play in a game in 2020 due to the cancellation of the Mexican League season because of the COVID-19 pandemic. On March 19, 2021, Vidal was released by the Diablos.

=== Lincoln Saltdogs ===
On May 3, 2021, Vidal signed with the Lincoln Saltdogs of the American Association of Professional Baseball. In 99 games, Vidal batted .282 with 15 home runs and 49 RBI. He was released by the team following the season on November 11.

== International career ==
In February 2017, he was named MVP of the Caribbean Series when he helped Puerto Rico's team, the Criollos de Caguas, win their 4th title.
