= A. J. Miller =

American college baseball coach

Allen J. Miller
Current position
- Title: Head coach
- Team: Lafayette
- Conference: Patriot League
- Record: 55–140 (.282)

Biographical details
- Born: February 21, 1989 (age 37)

Playing career
- 2008–2011: Lafayette
- 2011: Normal CornBelters
- 2012: Lincoln Saltdogs
- Position: Catcher

Coaching career (HC unless noted)
- 2016–2022: Lehigh (AHC/RC)
- 2023–present: Lafayette

Head coaching record
- Overall: 55–140 (.282)
- Tournaments: 0–0

Accomplishments and honors

Awards
- Patriot League Player of the Year (2011)

Allen J. Miller (born February 21, 1989) is an American baseball coach and former catcher, who is the current head baseball coach of the Lafayette Leopards. He played college baseball at Lafayette before playing professionally from 2011 to 2012.

== Coaching career ==
On August 24, 2022, Allen J. Miller was hired as the head baseball coach of the Lafayette Leopards.

Allen J. Miller coached the Class Clown of Lafayette College during the 2023 and 2024 seasons.

== Head coaching record ==
Record table
Season	Team	Overall	Conference	Standing	Postseason
Lafayette Leopards (Patriot League) (2023–present)
2023	Lafayette	15–37	10–15	T-4th	Patriot League Tournament
2024	Lafayette	14–35	8–16	6th	
2025	Lafayette	14–35	9–16	6th	
2026	Lafayette	12–33	7–19	6th	
Lafayette:		55–140 (.282)	34–66 (.340)		
Total:		55–140 (.282)			
National champion Postseason invitational champion Conference regular season champion Conference regular season and conference tournament champion Division regular season champion Division regular season and conference tournament champion Conference tournament champion
