= Kieran Lovegrove =

South African-American baseball player (born 1994)

- Pitcher
- Born: July 28, 1994 (age 32); Johannesburg, South Africa
- Bats: Right Throws: Right
- Stats at Baseball Reference

Kieran Lovegrove (born 28 July 1994) is a South African former professional baseball pitcher. He is known for advocating for better working and living conditions for minor league players as well as for being one of the first openly bisexual professional baseball players.

== Early life ==
Lovegrove was born in Johannesburg, South Africa, on July 28, 1994. His family moved to Southern California when he was 5 years old. He attended Los Angeles Dodgers games as a child.

He was a right-handed pitcher for the Mission Viejo High School team. In 2012, he ended the season with a 2.35 ERA and an 8-4 record, with his team winning the Sea View League title.

== Professional career ==
=== Cleveland Indians ===
Lovegrove was drafted by the Cleveland Indians in the third round (110th overall) of the 2012 Major League Baseball draft. He made his professional debut with the rookie–level Arizona League Indians, recording a 6.00 ERA across eight appearances. Lovegrove returned to the AZL Indians in 2013, accumulating a 1–7 record and 5.25 ERA with 51 strikeouts across 13 appearances (including 12 starts).

Lovegrove spent the 2014 season with the Low–A Mahoning Valley Scrappers, recording a 3.90 ERA with 14 strikeouts over eight starts; he made 14 starts for the Scrappers in 2015, compiling a 1–8 record and 6.08 ERA with 37 strikeouts across 60 2/3 innings pitched. Lovegrove made 39 appearances out of the bullpen in 2016 for the Single–A Lake County Captains, logging a 4–3 record and 4.25 ERA with 44 strikeouts and six saves. He spent the 2017 season with the High–A Lynchburg Hillcats, posting a 4–3 record and 5.01 ERA with 51 strikeouts in 50 1/3 innings pitched across 38 games (including two starts).

In 2018, Lovegrove represented the World Team during the All Star Futures Game. He made 41 relief outings split between High–A Lynchburg, the Double–A Akron RubberDucks, and Triple–A Columbus Clippers, accumulating a 4–0 record and 2.73 ERA with 66 strikeouts and three saves across 59 1/3 innings pitched. Lovegrove elected free agency following the season on November 2, 2018.

=== San Francisco Giants ===
On January 24, 2019, Lovegrove signed a minor league contract with the San Francisco Giants. He made 15 appearances for the Double–A Richmond Flying Squirrels, compiling a 2–2 record and 8.69 ERA with 18 strikeouts and one save across 19 2/3 innings pitched. Lovegrove was released by the Giants organization on June 12.

=== Baltimore Orioles ===
On June 20, 2019, Lovegrove signed a minor league contract with the Baltimore Orioles. He made five starts for the High–A Frederick Keys, but struggled to an 0–2 record and 9.95 ERA with nine strikeouts across 6 1/3 innings pitched. Lovegrove elected free agency following the season on November 4.

=== Los Angeles Dodgers ===
On February 25, 2020, Lovegrove signed a minor league contract with the Los Angeles Dodgers. He did not play in a game in 2020 due to the cancellation of the minor league season because of the COVID-19 pandemic. Lovegrove was released by the Dodgers organization on July 1.

=== Los Angeles Angels ===
On March 12, 2021, Lovegrove signed a minor league contract with the Los Angeles Angels. He made 25 appearances for the Double–A Rocket City Trash Pandas, registering a 2–1 record and 7.20 ERA with 49 strikeouts over 40 innings of work. Lovegrove elected free agency following the season on November 7.

Lovegrove retired from professional baseball following the 2021 season.

== Advocacy for Minor League Baseball players ==
In July 2021, while in the Los Angeles Angels' Minor League Baseball system, Lovegrove spoke to ESPN about the living conditions for Minor League Baseball players. Lovegrove's publicity of this caused players to begin conversations about how to change their living conditions. Lovegrove met personally with Angels leadership to share more details and offer recommendations. At the end of that season, as Lovegrove decided to retire from professional baseball, he reached out again to ESPN to share more of his story.

Lovegrove joined the Advocates for Minor Leaguers, a nonprofit advocacy group focused on collective action and organizing among Minor League Baseball players, funded by the Major League Baseball Players Association and the Ford Foundation. This advocacy led to players being given free housing. In 2022, Major League Baseball voluntarily recognized the MLBPA as the union for minor league players as well.

== Bisexuality ==
Lovegrove came out publicly as bisexual in an article published by ESPN in September 2021. He had not told teammates until 2019. At the time, he was the second Major League Baseball-affiliated active player to openly identify as LGBTQ, following David Denson. Lovegrove indicated most teammates were open to hearing about his sexuality.
