= Sioux City Explorers =

Minor-league baseball team in Sioux City, Iowa

Logo
Cap insignia

Information
- League: American Association of Professional Baseball (2006–present) (West Division)
- Location: Sioux City, Iowa
- Ballpark: Lewis and Clark Park
- Founded: 1993
- Nickname: The X's
- Division championships: 5
- Former league: Northern League (1993–2005)
- Former ballpark: none
- Colors: Black, red, Vegas gold, white
- Retired numbers: 42
- Ownership: John Roost
- General manager: Tom Backemeyer
- Manager: Steve Montgomery
- Media: Sioux City Journal; KSCJ
- Website: xsbaseball.com

The Sioux City Explorers are a professional baseball team based in Sioux City, Iowa, in the United States. The Explorers are inaugural members of the American Association of Professional Baseball, an official Partner League of Major League Baseball. Since their inception in 1993, the Explorers have played their home games at Lewis and Clark Park.

The Explorers, frequently called the X's, have played in the American Association since 2006. Previously, they were members of the Northern League.

== Season-by-season records ==
Sioux City Explorers (2010–2025)
| Season | W–L | Win % | Finish | Playoffs |
|---|---|---|---|---|
| 2010 | 49–47 | .510 | 4th, North Division | Did not qualify |
| 2011 | 51–49 | .510 | 3rd, Central Division | Did not qualify |
| 2012 | 45–55 | .450 | 4th, Central Division | Did not qualify |
| 2013 | 38–62 | .380 | 5th, Central Division | Did not qualify |
| 2014 | 47–53 | .470 | 4th, Central Division | Did not qualify |
| 2015 | 75–25 | .750 | 1st, Central Division | Defeated St. Paul, 3–1 in first round, lost Championship vs. Laredo 3–1 |
| 2016 | 54–46 | .540 | 1st, Central Division | Lost first round 3–1 vs. Wichita. |
| 2017 | 46–54 | .460 | 4th, Central Division | Did not qualify |
| 2018 | 71–29 | .710 | 1st, South Division | Lost in first round to Kansas City T-Bones 3–2 |
| 2019 | 57–43 | .570 | 2nd, South Division | Defeated Kansas City 3–1 in semifinals; lost to St. Paul 3–0 in championship |
| 2020 | Season cancelled due to COVID-19 pandemic | | | |
| 2021 | 53–46 | .535 | 3rd, South Division | Defeated Cleburne in Wild Card game; lost to Kansas City 3-0 in Division Series |
| 2022 | 49–51 | .490 | 5th, West Division | Did not qualify |
| 2023 | 52–48 | .520 | 2nd, West Division | Defeated Fargo-Moorhead 2-0 in First Round; lost to Kansas City 2-1 in Division Finals |
| 2024 | 48–52 | .485 | 4th, West Division | Lost to Fargo-Moorhead 2-1 in First Round |
| 2025 | 64–36 | .640 | 1st, West Division | Lost to Sioux Falls 2-1 in First Round |
| Totals | 799–696 | .534 | — | — |

== Playoffs ==
- 1994 season: Lost to Winnipeg 3–1 in championship
- 1999 season: Lost to Winnipeg 3–0 in semifinals
- 2002 season: Defeated Joliet 3–2 in quarterfinals; lost to Winnipeg 3–1 in semifinals
- 2008 season: Lost to Sioux Falls 3–0 in semifinals
- 2015 season: Defeated St. Paul 3–1 in semifinals; lost to Laredo 3–1 in championship
- 2016 season: Lost to Wichita 3–1 in semifinals
- 2018 season: Lost to Kansas City 3–2 in semifinals
- 2019 season: Defeated Kansas City 3–1 in semifinals; lost to St. Paul 3–0 in championship
- 2021 season: Defeated Cleburne in Wildcard game; lost to Kansas City 3–0 in Division Series
- 2023 season: Defeated Fargo-Moorhead 2–0 in first round; lost to Kansas City 2–1 in Division Finals
- 2024 season: Lost to Fargo-Moorhead 2–1 in first round
- 2025 season: Lost to Sioux Falls 2–1 in First Round

== Roster ==
Sioux City Explorers Roster
| Active Roster | Coaching Staff |
|---|---|
| Pitchers: 28 Zach Willeman; 10 Brandon Brosher; 15 Austin Drury; 36 Nate Gercken; 4 Jeremy Goins ‡; 21 Jaren Jackson; 30 Kyle Marman; 11 Braunny Munoz; 12 Joey Murray; 35 Brendan O'Donnell; 50 J. D. Scholten; 23 John Sheaks; 16 Jared Wetherbee; Catchers: 24 Wilfredo Gimenez ‡; 25 Jake Green; 99 Ryan January ‡; 33 Jake Ortega; Infielders: 9 Cameron Cannon; 17 Daniel Lingua; 7 Ozzie Martínez; 24 John Nogowski; 76 Preston Palmeiro ‡; 44 Daniel Perez; 6 Nick Shumpert; Outfielders: 3 Justin Connell; 18 D'Shawn Knowles; 8 Daniel Montano; 5 Scott Ota; 2 Zac Vooletich | Manager: 55 Steve Montgomery; Coaches: Bruce Fischbach (trainer); -- Josh Hinz (hitting); 40 Bobby Post (pitching); Disabled list; ‡ Inactive list; >§ Suspended list; Roster updated August 10, 2024 Transactions |

== Notable alumni ==
- Ty Griffin (1993)
- Joe Kraemer (1993-1994)
- Oil Can Boyd (1994-1995)
- Carl Nichols (1995)
- Mark Merchant (1995)
- Gerald Young (1995-1996)
- Dana Williams (1996)
- Julius Matos (1997)
- Danny Perez (1997)
- Mike Porzio (1997)
- Matt Turner (1997)
- Michael Marchesano (1999–2000)
- Nate Bland (2000)
- Mike Busby (2000)
- Nate Field (2000)
- Brent Bowers (2001)
- Jeff Juden (2001)
- John LeRoy (2001)
- Cris Colón (2002)
- Trey Beamon (2003)
- Mike Figga (2003)
- José Malavé (2003)
- John Cotton (2003)
- Desi Wilson (2003-2004)
- J. D. Scholten (2003–2004, 2006–2007, 2024–present)
- Allan Simpson (2007)
- Charlton Jimerson (2008)
- Walter Young (2008-2009)
- Steve Andrade (2009)
- Jacob Cruz (2010)
- T. J. Bohn (2010-2011)
- Emiliano Fruto (2011)
- Nick Schumacher (2011–2012)
- Richard Salazar (2011–2012)
- John Holdzkom (2013)
- Cody Satterwhite (2013)
- Alex Burnett (2014)
- Jesse English (2014)
- Brock Kjeldgaard (2014-2015)
- Rene Tosoni (2014-2015)
- Ryan Court (2015)
- John Ely (2015)
- David Herndon (2015)
- Jeff Marquez (2015)
- Tommy Mendonca (2014-2016)
- Derrick Robinson (2016)
- Tayler Scott (2016)
- Connor Overton (2016)
- Cody Forsythe (2016-2017)
- Tony Campana (2017)
- John Nogowski (2017, 2023–2024)
- Bubby Rossman (2017)
- Josh Vitters (2017)
- Alex White (2017)
- Luis Durango (2018)
- Parker Markel (2018)
- Patrick Schuster (2018)
- Dean Green (2018-2019)
- Anthony Bender (2019)
- Jason Garcia (2019)
- Jeremy Hazelbaker (2019)
- Taylor Jordan (2019)
- Spencer Jones (2021)
- Nick Franklin (2021–2022)
- Blaine Hardy (2022)
- Nivaldo Rodríguez (2022)
- Eury Pérez (2023)
- Luís Madero (2023)
- Nick Shumpert (2024–2025)
- Santiago Florez (2024)
- Joey Murray (2024)
- Ozzie Martínez (2024)
