= Lake Gibson High School =

Location
- 7007 N. Socrum Loop Road; Lakeland, Florida 33809; United States; 28°8′0″N 81°57′15″W

Information
- Established: 1979
- Principal: Elizabeth DeShazor
- Staff: 88.00 (FTE)
- Enrollment: 2,039 (2023-2024)
- Student to teacher ratio: 23.17
- Colors: Garnet and Gold
- Mascot: Brave
- Website: LGHS Homepage

Lake Gibson High School is located in Lakeland, Florida, and was established in 1979.

== Athletics ==
Lake Gibson offers a wide variety of sports for boys and girls including: Baseball, boys and girls basketball, boys and girls cross country, weightlifting, competitive cheer, football, boys and girls golf, boys and girls soccer, boys and girls swimming, softball, boys and girls track, boys and girls tennis, wrestling, girls volleyball, boys lacrosse and girls lacrosse

== Facts ==
- Garnet and gold are the LGHS school colors.
- The LGHS mascot is a Native American (Brave).
- Fight song is the same as the Florida State University Garnet and Gold March.

== Notable alumni ==
- Sean Barber, Major League Baseball (MLB) umpire
- Lance Davis, Former MLB player (Cincinnati Reds)
- Adarius Glanton, NFL player
- Matt Grothe, played quarterback for the University of South Florida and is a 2005 Alumnus
- JD Harmeyer, media producer for The Howard Stern Show
- Bilal Powell, football running back. ( New York Jets )
- Chris Waters, Former MLB player (Baltimore Orioles)
- Keydrick Vincent, NFL player, Baltimore Ravens
- Jason Watkins, graduated class of 2004 and played for the University of Florida
- Donald Parham, football tight end. (Los Angeles Chargers)
- Tyrice Knight, NFL linebacker for the Seattle Seahawks
