= Nick Schumacher =

Spanish baseball player (born 1985)

- Pitcher
- Born: Nicholas Schumacher; 24 July 1985 (age 41); Wayne, Nebraska, U.S.
- Bats: Right Throws: Right
- Stats at Baseball Reference

Nicholas Schumacher (born 24 July 1985) is an American former professional baseball player who played as a pitcher. Born in the United States, he represented Spain internationally.

He was drafted by the San Diego Padres in the 28th round of the 2008 MLB draft out of Wayne State College, where he earned All-American honors in 2008 and was selected as NSIC Pitcher of the Year. He pitched in the Padres system through 2010. His last season there he pitched in 40 games with the Fort Wayne TinCaps and 23 games with the Lake Elsinore Storm and had a combined record of 4–7 with a 5.13 ERA.

After his release from the Padres, Schumacher contacted a former teammate who was playing with the Sioux City Explorers of the American Association of Independent Professional Baseball who convinced the Manager to give him a shot. For the 2011 season, he pitched 148.2 innings for the Explorers, a single season record, finishing second in the AA in strikeouts (123) and third in ERA (3.03). At the end of the season he also played in a few games for the York Revolution in the Atlantic League of Professional Baseball. He returned to Sioux City for 2012 but had a weaker season with a 5–8 record and 5.57 ERA.

Schumacher has signed with York for 2013.

== International career ==
Born in the United States, Schumacher is of Spanish descent through his parents. He played for the Spain national baseball team in the 2013 World Baseball Classic.
