= Sean Barber =

American baseball umpire (born 1985)

MLB – No. 29
- Umpire
- Born: May 22, 1985 (age 40); Lakeland, Florida, U.S.

MLB debut
- March 30, 2014

Crew information
- Umpiring crew: E
- Crew members: #92 James Hoye (crew chief); #17 D. J. Reyburn; #84 John Libka; #29 Sean Barber

Career highlights and awards
- Special assignments: 2013 World Baseball Classic qualification; Wild Card Series (2023); MLB Little League Classic (2019, 2021, 2023)

Sean Michael Barber (born May 22, 1985) is an American professional baseball umpire in Major League Baseball (MLB). He began working in MLB as a call-up umpire in 2014 and was hired as a full-time umpire before the 2022 season.

== Career ==
Barber graduated from Lake Gibson High School in Lakeland, Florida, in 2004. He began working as an umpire at the age of 15 in Little League Baseball in North Lakeland and also called high school baseball games.

Barber enrolled at Hillsborough Community College. While he was working at a pet store, Barber was bitten by an eel through the bone of his right hand near his thumb, requiring him to get 27 stitches three weeks before the start of his sophomore year. Unable to write, Barber turned his attention to umpiring, and enrolled at the Harry Wendelstedt Umpire School. He graduated from the school in the top 25 of his class. Barber attended an umpiring camp hosted by Major League Baseball (MLB), and was hired as an umpire in Minor League Baseball in 2006, making his professional baseball debut in the Appalachian League. He umpired in the 2012 Arizona Fall League (AFL) Rising Stars Game and the 2013 World Baseball Classic qualification. He returned to umpire in the AFL in 2013 and one of his calls was the first to be tested for expanded instant replay.

Barber became a call-up umpire for MLB in 2014. After he umpired in 690 MLB games through the 2021 season, MLB hired Barber as a full-time umpire before the 2022 season.

== Personal life ==
Barber's father, Glenn Chancey, has worked as an umpire and umpiring instructor in the North Lakeland Little League since 1991.
