= Wichita Wingnuts =

Baseball team in Wichita, Kansas, United States

- 2008–2018; Wichita, Kansas
Team logo
Cap insignia

Minor league affiliations
- Class: Independent (2008–2018)
- League: American Association (2008–2018)

Minor league titles
- League titles (1): 2014
- Division titles (8): 2009; 2011; 2012; 2013; 2014; 2015; 2016; 2017

Team data
- Colors: Red, black, white, dark gray, medium gray, light gray, off-white
- Ballpark: Lawrence–Dumont Stadium (2008–2018)
- Owner/ Operator: Wichita Pro Sports
- General manager: Brian Turner
- Manager: Brent Clevlen
- Media: Wichita Eagle
- Website: www.wichitawingnuts.com

The Wichita Wingnuts were an independent baseball team based in Wichita, Kansas, in the United States. The Wingnuts were members of the South Division of the American Association of Professional Baseball.

An expansion franchise in the 2008 season, the Wingnuts played their home games at Lawrence–Dumont Stadium through the end of the 2018 season. The Wingnuts replaced the Wichita Wranglers, the former Double-A affiliate of the Kansas City Royals. The first Wichita Wingnuts manager was Kash Beauchamp, who gained notoriety for his tirade during a game on July 9. Beauchamp's contract was not renewed at the end of the 2008 season. Kevin Hooper replaced Beauchamp as the manager for the 2009 season. The Wingnuts finished the first half of 2008 in second place, but a slide in the second half left them with an overall record of 45–50 in their inaugural season. In 2016, Hooper left to coach as an infield coordinator in the San Diego Padres farm system. Pete Rose Jr. took over as manager following Hooper's departure.

In 2009, the Wingnuts won the North Division title for the first half of the season, and in 2010 hosted the American Association All-Star Game at Lawrence-Dumont Stadium. The Wingnuts were named the 2010 American Association Organization of the Year. In 2012, the Wingnuts completed of 3-game sweep of the Laredo Lemurs to advance to the American Association Championship Series against the Winnipeg Goldeyes. In 2013, they defeated the Grand Prairie AirHogs, but lost to the Gary SouthShore RailCats in the American Association Championship Series. In 2014, they defeated the Laredo Lemurs in 4 games, and swept the Lincoln Saltdogs in the final to win their first American Association Championship.

In September 2018, the city of Wichita paid $2.2 million to the Wingnuts to break their lease at Lawrence–Dumont Stadium, with plans to demolish it and build a larger ballpark on the site to host an affiliated Minor League Baseball team. Wichita Mayor Jeff Longwell later announced that a new $81 million stadium would be built to host the Triple-A New Orleans Baby Cakes, who agreed to relocate to Wichita starting in 2020. Following the cancellation of the 2020 season due to the COVID-19 pandemic and the 2021 reorganization of Minor League Baseball, the team began play as the Wichita Wind Surge, Double-A affiliate of the Minnesota Twins, in 2021.

== Season-by-season record ==
| Season | W–L | Percentage | Finish | Playoffs |
|---|---|---|---|---|
| 2008 | 45–50 | .474 | 4th, North Division | None |
| 2009 | 58–38 | .604 | 1st, North Division | Lost Semifinals 3-2 vs. Lincoln |
| 2010 | 50–46 | .521 | 3rd, North Division | None |
| 2011 | 55–45 | .550 | 1st, Central Division | Lost Semifinals 3-1 vs. Grand Prairie |
| 2012 | 59–41 | .590 | 1st, Central Division | Lost Semifinals 3-0 vs. Laredo |
| 2013 | 68–32 | .680 | 1st, Central Division | Won Semifinals 3-0 vs. Grand Prairie; Lost Finals 3-1 vs. Gary SouthShore |
| 2014 | 73–27 | .730 | 1st, South Division | Won Semifinals 3-1 vs. Laredo; Won Finals 3-0 vs. Lincoln |
| 2015 | 59–41 | .590 | 1st, South Division | Lost Semifinals 3-2 vs. Laredo |
| 2016 | 61–39 | .580 | 1st, South Division | Won Semifinals 3-2 vs. St. Paul; Lost Finals 3-2 vs. Winnipeg |
| 2017 | 61–38 | .616 | 1st, South Division | Won Semifinals 3-0 vs. Gary; Lost Finals 3-2 vs. Winnipeg |
| 2018 | 61–39 | .610 | 3rd, South Division | None |
| Totals | 650–436 | .599 | | 8 Playoff Appearances, 1 Championship |

== Playoffs ==
- 2009 season: Lost to Lincoln 3–2 in semifinals.
- 2011 season: Lost to Grand Prairie 3–1 in semifinals.
- 2012 season: Defeated Laredo 3–0 in semifinals; lost to Winnipeg 3–0 in championship.
- 2013 season: Defeated Grand Prairie 3–0 in semifinals; lost to Gary SouthShore 3–1 in championship.
- 2014 season: Defeated Laredo 3–1 in semifinals; defeated Lincoln 3–0 to win championship.
- 2015 season: Lost to Laredo 3–2 in semifinals.
- 2016 season: Defeated Sioux City 3–1 in semifinals; lost to Winnipeg 3–2 in championship.
- 2017 season: Defeated Gary SouthShore 3–0 in semifinals; lost to Winnipeg 3–2 in championship.
