= David Reeves (American football) =

American football coach

Biographical details
- Born: 1965 or 1966

Playing career
- 1984–1987: Montana
- Position: Strong safety

Coaching career (HC unless noted)
- 1989–1990: Montana (GA)
- 1991–1999: Montana (LB)
- 2000–2003: Utah State (AHC/LB)
- 2004–2008: Rocky Mountain
- 2009–2015: Northern Arizona (STC/SAF)

Head coaching record
- Overall: 12–43

Accomplishments and honors

Awards
- NCAA Division I-AA national champion (1995)

David Reeves (born 1965 or 1966) is an American former college football coach. He was the head coach at Rocky Mountain College from 2004 to 2008.

== Early life ==
Reeves was a four-year letterman for the Montana Grizzlies of the University of Montana from 1984 to 1987, and also a two-year starter at strong safety. He was named the team's most inspirational player his senior year in 1987. He graduated with a Bachelor of Arts degree in history in 1991.

== Coaching career ==
Reeves began his college career as a graduate assistant at his alma mater, Montana, from 1989 to 1990. He was then the team's linebackers coach from 1991 to 1999. The 1995 Grizzlies were NCAA Division I-AA national champions.

Reeves served as the assistant head coach and linebackers coach for the Utah State Aggies of Utah State University from 2000 to 2003.

On December 9, 2003, it was announced that Reeves had resigned from Utah State to become the head coach for the Rocky Mountain Battlin' Bears of Rocky Mountain College. He signed a four-year contract with Rocky Mountain. He also signed one-year extensions after both the 2007 and 2008 seasons. Reeves served as head coach from 2004 to 2008, accumulating an overall record of 12–43.

In late July 2009, Reeves resigned from Rocky Mountain to join the Northern Arizona Lumberjacks of Northern Arizona University. He served as special teams coordinator and safeties coach from 2009 to 2015.

== Head coaching record ==
=== College ===
Year	Team	Overall	Conference	Standing	Bowl/playoffs
Rocky Mountain Battlin' Bears (Frontier Conference) (2004–2008)
2004	Rocky Mountain	1–10	1–7	T–4th	
2005	Rocky Mountain	1–10	1–7	5th	
2006	Rocky Mountain	2–9	1–9	T–5th	
2007	Rocky Mountain	4–7	3–7	5th	
2008	Rocky Mountain	4–7	3–7	5th	
Rocky Mountain:		12–43	9–37		
Total:		12–43			
