= National Register of Historic Places listings in Wright County, Missouri =

Location of Wright County in Missouri

This is a list of the National Register of Historic Places listings in Wright County, Missouri.

This is intended to be a complete list of the properties and districts on the National Register of Historic Places in Wright County, Missouri, United States. Latitude and longitude coordinates are provided for many National Register properties and districts; these locations may be seen together in a map.

There are 5 properties and districts listed on the National Register in the county, including 1 National Historic Landmark.

This National Park Service list is complete through NPS recent listings posted March 14, 2025.

== Current listings ==
	Name on the Register	Image	Date listed	Location	City or town	Description
1	Administration Building, Missouri State Fruit Experiment Station	Administration Building, Missouri State Fruit Experiment Station	January 12, 1979 (#79001398)	North of Mountain Grove off U.S. Route 60; 37°09′11″N 92°15′45″W	Mountain Grove	
2	Kelton House		October 2, 1983 (#86002803)	Route 38 and Church St. 37°16′09″N 92°30′46″W	Hartville	
3	Mountain Grove Bandstand		January 19, 1989 (#88003218)	Main and 2nd Sts. 37°07′46″N 92°15′44″W	Mountain Grove	
4	Mountain Grove City Hall		February 28, 2012 (#12000050)	301 E. 1st St. 37°07′45″N 92°15′41″W	Mountain Grove	
5	Laura Ingalls Wilder House	Laura Ingalls Wilder House	May 19, 1970 (#70000353)	1 mile (1.6 km) east of Mansfield on U.S. Route 60 Business; 37°05′58″N 92°33′22″W	Mansfield	Also known as Rocky Ridge Farm; home of Little House on the Prairie series author Laura Ingalls Wilder from 1896 until her death in 1957

== See also ==
- List of National Historic Landmarks in Missouri
- National Register of Historic Places listings in Missouri
