= Henry H. Hohenschild =

American architect

- Born: June 2, 1862; St. Louis, Missouri
- Died: February 3, 1928 (aged 65); St. Louis, Missouri
- Occupation: Architect
- Projects: State Mental Institution in Farmington

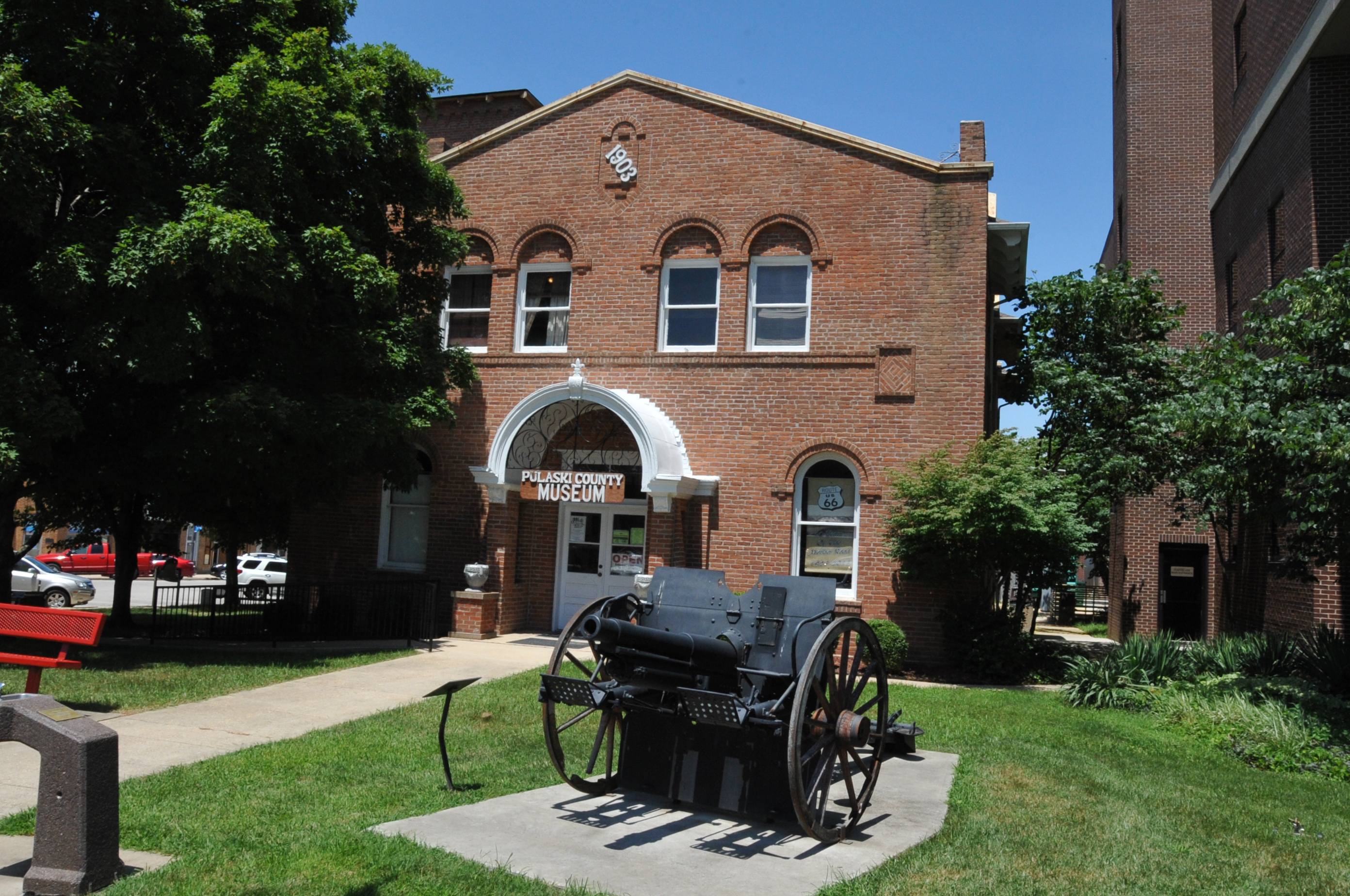
Pulaski County Courthouse, Waynesville, Missouri, 1903

Henry H. Hohenschild (June 2, 1862 – February 3, 1928), also known as H.H. Hohenschild, was an architect based in Rolla, Missouri, USA. He was born in St. Louis, and educated in the city's public schools. Hohenschild moved to Rolla in 1881, where he established an architectural practice designing public and residential buildings. He was elected to the Missouri Senate in 1896. In 1899 was appointed State Architect by Governor Lon V. Stephens which involved the architect in designing several state buildings including some at the state penitentiary. In addition to 10 county courthouses, he designed several buildings for the School of Mines (now the Missouri University of Science and Technology), the State Mental Institution in Farmington (1901), the Tuberculosis Sanitarium in Mount Vernon, Missouri (1905), and the temporary state capitol building in Jefferson City in 1912. He died on February 3, 1928, in St. Louis from a heart condition.

== Selected works ==
- 1900: Administration Building, Missouri State Fruit Experiment Station, N of Mountain Grove off MO 60 Mountain Grove, Missouri, listed on the National Register of Historic Places in 1979.
- 1903: North Ward School, 201 W. Locust St., Bolivar, Missouri, listed on the National Register of Historic Places in 2011.
- 1903: Pulaski County Courthouse, Courthouse Sq. Waynesville, Missouri, listed on the National Register of Historic Places in 1983.
- 1904: Ralph E. Burley House, 389 S. Adams Ave. Lebanon, Missouri, listed on the National Register of Historic Places in 1994.
- 1908: Washington County Courthouse, 102 N. Missouri St., Potosi, Missouri, listed on the National Register of Historic Places in 2011.
- 1912: Scott County Courthouse, 131 S. Winchester St. Benton, Missouri, listed on the National Register of Historic Places in 1983.
- 1913: Christian County Courthouse in the Ozark Courthouse Square Historic District, Portions of 2nd. Ave., Church, Elm, and 2nd Sts. on the Courthouse Square Ozark, Missouri, listed on the National Register of Historic Places in 1979.
