= Ohio Valley Redcoats =

- 1993–2005

Minor league affiliations
- Class: Independent (1993–2005)
- League: Frontier League (1993–2005)

Minor league titles
- Division titles: 1993; 1994; 2001; 2002

Team data
- Name: Ohio Valley Redcoats (2005); Springfield-Ozark Ducks (2004); Kenosha Mammoths (2003); Dubois County Dragons (1999-2002); Ohio Valley Redcoats (1993-1998)
- Colors: Red, royal blue, white
- Ballpark: Price Cutter Park (2004); Simmons Field (2003); League Stadium (1999-2002); Bennett Stump Field (1993-1998)

The Ohio Valley Redcoats were a professional baseball team in the independent Frontier League.

== Team history ==
Originally located in Parkersburg, West Virginia, the Ohio Valley Redcoats franchise was an original member of the Frontier League. The team played its first six seasons in Parkersburg (1993–1998), making the league playoffs in its first two seasons. After finishing last in three consecutive seasons (1996–1998), the team moved to Dubois County, Indiana.

From 1999 to 2002, the team was known as the Dubois County Dragons, playing in Huntingburg, Indiana. They made the playoffs in 2001 and 2002, winning their division both seasons.

In 2003, the team moved to Kenosha, Wisconsin as the Kenosha Mammoths. Their one season in Kenosha was a moderate success, seeing the team finish third in their division. However, sub-par attendance forced the team to move again prior to the 2004 season.

2004 saw the team move to Ozark, Missouri and become the Springfield-Ozark Ducks. Their lone season in Price Cutter Park proved to be a success on the field as they finished with a winning record, albeit fourth in their division. However, success didn't translate off the field as minimal attendance forced the franchise to move yet again.

2005 brought the team back to its roots as they were renamed the Ohio Valley Redcoats. Low in funding and without a home ballpark, the Redcoats were forced to play the majority of their schedule on the road. The few home games they did have were split between Lorain, Ohio, Marietta, Ohio, and Lafayette, Indiana. The team played respectably on the field however, finishing only three games under .500, fifth in their division.

Because they had no city or ballpark to play in, the Redcoats were forced to suspend operations before the start of the 2006 season.

== Seasons ==
As Ohio Valley

1993: 29-32 1st Place Eastern Division:

Lost Frontier League Championship 2-0 to Zanesville

1994: 50-17 1st Place Northern Division:

Lost Northern Division Playoff 2-0 to Erie

1995: 36-34 5th Place (No Divisions in 1995)

1996: 31-43 4th Place Eastern Division

1997: 21-59 4th Place Eastern Division

1998: 26-52 4th Place Eastern Division

As Dubois County

1999: 42-42 2nd Place Western Division

2000: 35-47 5th Place Western Division

2001: 48-36 1st Place Western Division:

Lost 1st Round Playoff 2-1 to Richmond

2002: 52-32 1st Place Western Division:

Lost 1st Round Playoff 2-1 to Richmond

As Kenosha

2003: 47-42 3rd Place Western Division

As Springfield-Ozark

2004: 52-44 3rd Place Western Division

As Ohio Valley (2)

2005: 46-49 5th Place Eastern Division
