= Springfield-Ozark Mountain Ducks =

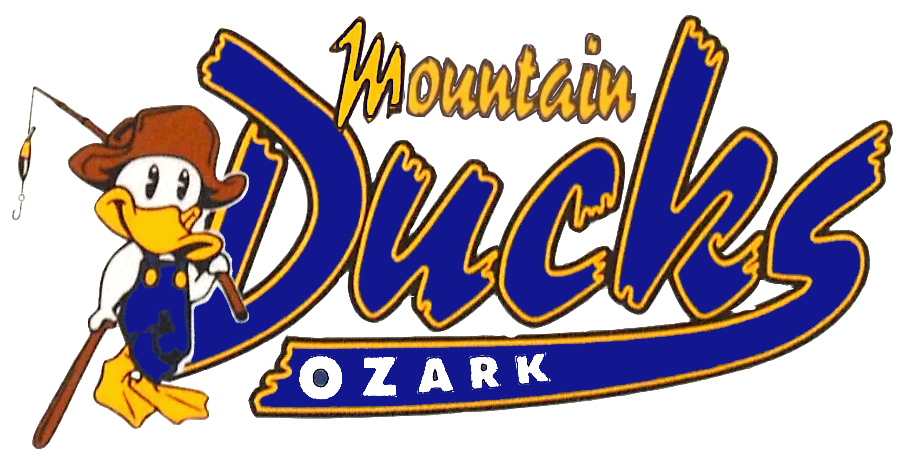
Logo
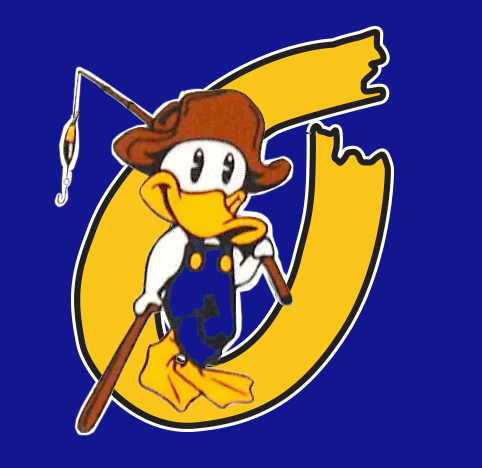
Cap insignia

Information
- Location: Ozark, Missouri
- Ballpark: Price Cutter Park
- Founded: 1998
- Disbanded: 2004
- League championships: None
- Division championships: None
- Former name: Ozark Mountain Ducks (1999-2000); Springfield-Ozark Ducks (2004)
- Former leagues: Texas–Louisiana League (1999–2001); Central Baseball League (2001-03); Frontier League (2004)
- Colors: Royal blue, yellow, white, black, brown
- Ownership: Horn Chen ($3 million purchase)

The Springfield-Ozark Mountain Ducks was an unaffiliated minor league team that previously played in Ozark, Missouri, a suburb of Springfield. The team was a member of the Texas-Louisiana League, later named the Central Baseball League from 1999 to 2003. The team played in Price Cutter Park, now known as Ozark Mountain Sports Complex.

== History ==
In April 1998, Texas-Louisiana League president and co-founder Byron Pierce announced that the league would put a new team in Ozark pending financing for a new ballpark. In August the funding was secured. Construction on the stadium started in late fall and took four months to complete.

The peculiar team name and mascot was picked from a name-the-team contest in 1998. The winning entry—by Craig Cremer of Ozark—was picked out of 65,000 submissions. Cremer says the kid-friendly name was derived from a combination of the Ozark Mountains and the Ride the Ducks boat ride in Branson

The Mountain Ducks played their inaugural game on May 27, 1999 on the road, a 7-4 loss to the Amarillo Dillas. Their first home game came two weeks later on June 10 in front of 4,764 people, a 5-2 loss, also against Amarillo.

Success on the field was hard to come by for the team. The Mountain Ducks only made the postseason one time during its tenure, a first round exit in 2000.

Two players with Major League experience played for Springfield-Ozark: Outfielder Mel Hall (2002) played 13 seasons, mostly with the Cleveland Indians and New York Yankees and Pitcher Mike Smith (1999-2001). Smith played in 15 games over two seasons with the Baltimore Orioles.

The team joined the Frontier League in 2004. The Mountain Ducks rights to the club's spot in the CBL were sold in 2004 to the Pensacola Pelicans of the discontinued Southeastern League.

The Ducks only played one season in the Frontier League. Its time in Ozark ended for good after hotel magnate John Q. Hammons purchased the rights to the El Paso Diablos in the Texas League (AA), moved them to nearby downtown Springfield and renamed them the Cardinals. The franchise moved east to Ohio/Indiana and were renamed the Ohio Valley Redcoats.

== Team Record ==
The Mountain Ducks had a combined record of 261-312 over six seasons.

Season	Wins	Losses	Finish	Manager	Playoffs
1999	32	50	5th	Barry Jones	Missed playoffs
2000	59	53	4th	Barry Jones	Lost First Round; Amarillo 1–2
2001	33	58	6th	Barry Jones	Missed playoffs
2002	45	51	6th (3rd, East)	Phil Wilson	Missed playoffs
2003	40	56	8th (4th, East)	Phil Wilson	Missed playoffs
2004	52	44	6th (4th, West)	Greg Tagert	Missed playoffs

== All-Stars ==
1999: Brent Bubela, C; Sergio Cairo, OF; Mike Smith, P
2000: Mike Smith, P; Jim Wollscheid, P
2001: Andre Johnson, OF; Mike Smith, P
2002: None
2003: None
2004: None
