= Ozark Courthouse Square Historic District =

Ozark Courthouse Square Historic District may refer to:

- Ozark Courthouse Square Historic District (Ozark, Arkansas), listed on the NRHP in Franklin County, Arkansas
- Ozark Courthouse Square Historic District (Ozark, Missouri), listed on the NRHP in Missouri
