= Bolivar Public Library =

- U.S. National Register of Historic Places
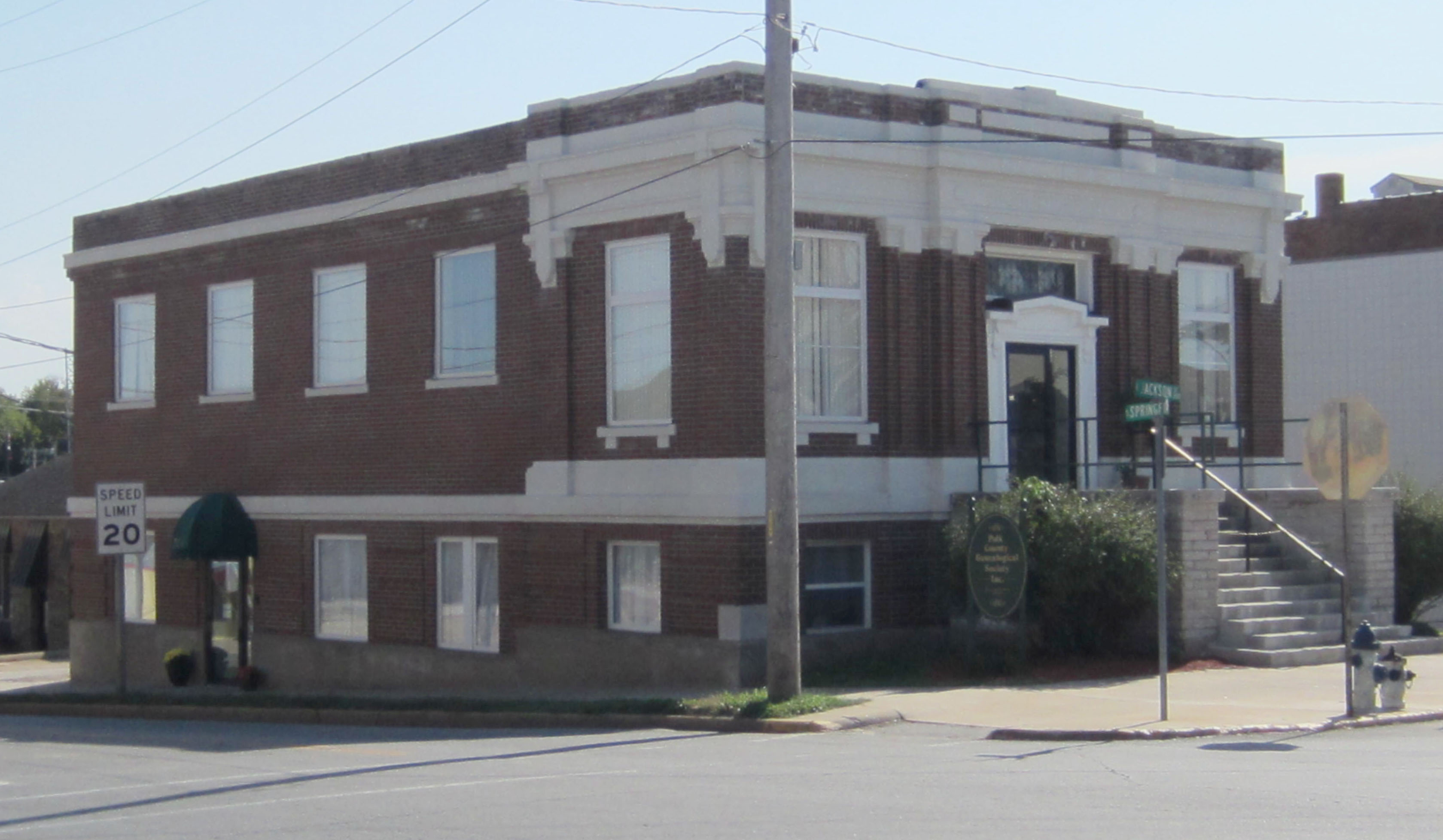
- Bolivar Public Library, October 2012

- Location within Missouri Location within the United States
- Location: 120 E. Jackson St., Bolivar, Missouri
- Coordinates: 37°36′48″N 93°24′37″W
- Area: less than one acre
- Built: 1915
- Architect: Heckenlively, J.J.
- Architectural style: Carnegie Classical
- NRHP reference No.: 03000652
- Added to NRHP: July 17, 2003

Bolivar Public Library, also known as the Carnegie Library of Bolivar and Polk County Genealogical Society Library, is a historic Carnegie library located at Bolivar, Polk County, Missouri. It was built in 1915, and is a 1 1/2- to two-story, rectangular, brick building with Classical Revival style design elements. It has a flat roof and three bay front facade with an elaborate center entranceway and large side window bays. It features intact terra cotta and tooled limestone ornamentation. It was funded by an $8,000 Carnegie grant from the Carnegie Foundation. The property was listed on the National Register of Historic Places in 2003.

The building no longer contains a public library. Since 2001, it has housed the offices of the Polk County Genealogical Society. The Polk County Library now operates the Bolivar Main Branch library at 1690 W. Broadway in Bolivar.
