= Horn Chen =

American businessman (1932–2015)

- Born: July 22, 1932
- Died: December 7, 2015 (aged 83); Bannockburn, Illinois, U.S.
- Occupation: Businessman
- Known for: Founder of the CHL

Horn Chen (July 22, 1932 – December 7, 2015) was an American businessman. He was the founder of the Central Hockey League, which began to play in 1992. Chen was also a minority owner of the Columbus Blue Jackets in the National Hockey League.

Chen has also been the owner of the Ottawa Rough Riders as well as several minor league teams in a variety of sports, including ice hockey, baseball and football. He died in 2015 at the age of 83 in Bannockburn, Illinois, where he lived.

== Sports teams owned by Horn Chen ==
=== Ice hockey ===
- Columbus Chill (ECHL)
- Indianapolis Ice (IHL)
- Mississippi RiverKings (CHL)
- Oklahoma City Blazers (CHL)
- Topeka Tarantulas (CHL)
- Wichita Thunder (CHL)

=== Football ===
- Memphis Xplorers (AF2)
- Oklahoma City Yard Dawgz (AFL)
- Ottawa Rough Riders (CFL)

=== Baseball ===
- Coastal Bend Aviators (CBL)
- Springfield-Ozark Mountain Ducks (CBL)

=== Basketball ===
- Fargo-Moorhead Fever (CBA)
