= Columbus Chill =

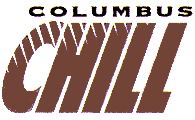
- City: Columbus, Ohio
- League: ECHL
- Founded: 1991
- Home arena: Ohio Expo Center Coliseum
- Colors: Black, white

Franchise history
- 1991–1999: Columbus Chill
- 2001–present: Reading Royals

Championships
- Division titles: 1996–97, 1998–99
- Kelly Cups: None

The Columbus Chill were a professional ice hockey team that played in the East Coast Hockey League from October 1991 through the 1998–99 season. They played at the Ohio Expo Center Coliseum in Columbus, Ohio. The Chill left Columbus in 1999 and relocated to Reading, Pennsylvania, with the impending arrival of the Columbus Blue Jackets in the National Hockey League. The Columbus Chill are now known as the Reading Royals.

== History ==
=== The Chill ===
The Columbus Chill started as an expansion team in the East Coast Hockey League (now ECHL) in 1991. The Chill followed a previous minor league hockey franchise in the International Hockey League (IHL) that had transferred ownership twice and operated under three different names in Ohio's capital city: the Columbus Checkers (1966–70), Columbus Golden Seals (1971–73), and Columbus Owls (1973–77).

Chicago businessman and sports entrepreneur Horn Chen, purchased the rights to an expansion franchise in the early 1991, with the intent of placing it in Cleveland. However, new team president and general manager David Paitson convinced him that Columbus was the right market. Paitson hired former National Hockey League player Terry Ruskowski as head coach. The team started with the goal of introducing new audiences to the sport of ice hockey and building a strong fan base. The Chill quickly built an impressive and loyal fan following and garnered the attention of the media in the United States and Canada. The team's aggressive marketing campaign received unprecedented coverage for a minor-league hockey team through The Wall Street Journal (which described the Chill as "hockey for the hip"), Sports Illustrated, The Hockey News and ABC World News Sunday. Columbus Monthly said, "Going to a Chill game is like walking into the world's largest dorm party," and named it the city's "Best Sporting Event" in 1992 and 1993. The American Marketing Association would recognize the Chill as "best marketing project" in 1994 and the Canadian Broadcasting Company proclaimed- "(the) Chill is the most successful minor league franchise in history."

Although initially not successful on the ice, the Chill was a huge marketing success through their outlandish promotions. Beginning in January 1992, the Chill sold out 83 straight games - more than tripling the previous minor league hockey mark. It was a standard that would last for nearly a decade. The Chill would sell out more than 80 percent of their games during their eight-year history in the 5,600-seat Ohio State Fairgrounds Expo Coliseum, which opened in 1918 and was the oldest building to house a professional team.

While the Chill regularly filled the building, it would take Ruskowski three seasons to reach the playoffs, doing so in 1994. The Chill would go on to win division championships in 1997 and 1999 and make the playoffs five of eight seasons. All four Chill coaches (Ruskowski, Moe Mantha Jr., Brian McCutcheon and Don Granato) would advance through the ranks with two (McCutcheon, Buffalo Sabres and Granato, St. Louis Blues) becoming NHL assistant coaches. McCutcheon would be named the 1997 ECHL Coach of the Year. Paitson was named 1997 ECHL Executive of the Year.

A near disastrous scheduling snafu by Fairgrounds officials in late 1992 that, unbeknownst to the Chill, would have eliminated many of the home games in the second half of the season nearly cost the city its franchise. The problem was quickly resolved after enormous public pressure.

The united show of force helped trigger formation of a downtown arena study and talk of NHL expansion. The Chill was deeply involved in the process from the onset with Paitson appointed as the sole hockey/sports representative to the 10-person Sports Facilities Work Group that included members from the city, chamber of commerce, county and convention authority. The Chill actively promoted the city's efforts to build a downtown arena and in 1994 publicly committed to be the major tenant. In June 1996, Paitson was part of a delegation that went to New York to inform National Hockey League commissioner Gary Bettman that Columbus was interested in an NHL franchise. In February 1997, the Franklin County Commissioners approved putting a 0.5 percent, three-year sales tax on the May ballot to help finance the construction of a $277 million complex that included a 21,000-seat arena and a 30,000-seat soccer stadium for the Columbus Crew of Major League Soccer. Issue One was defeated at the ballot on May 6, 1997, just days before the NHL was to announce its decision on expansion. Three days later, the NHL granted Columbus and other expansion city hopefuls more time to resolve their arena problems.

On June 2, 1997, the arena portion of the project was rescued as Nationwide Realty, Inc. announced it would build the arena privately. John H. McConnell, founder of Worthington Industries, stepped forward to become the principal owner of the NHL expansion franchise, later to be named the Columbus Blue Jackets. The NHL board of governors on June 25, 1997, approved Columbus, Atlanta, Minneapolis-St. Paul, and Nashville as expansion cities.

With the impending arrival of the Blue Jackets' first game in October 2000, the 1998–99 ECHL season would be the Chill's final one as the team was voluntarily suspended. As part of an agreement with McConnell, Chen would receive a small ownership stake in the Blue Jackets.

=== Suspension and relocation ===
After the 1998–99 season, the Chill suspended operations for both the 1999–2000 and the 2000–01 ECHL seasons after the arrival of the Columbus Blue Jackets. The Columbus Chill were sold and relocated to Reading, Pennsylvania, during their two-year inactive status to become the Reading Royals for the 2001–02 ECHL season.

== Highlights ==
- 1991 – Chicago businessman Horn Chen purchases an expansion franchise.
- 1992 – Chill begins minor league hockey record 83 game sellout streak (191 sellouts in franchise history); set ECHL regular-season (1991–92) records at the time for highest goals against average (5.33, 341 goals in 64 games, still 5th in ECHL history), most power-play goals against (111, 2nd in ECHL history), most penalty minutes (2,751, 4th in ECHL history), and highest penalty minutes per-game average (43.0, 2,751 minutes in 64 games, 3rd in ECHL history); named "Best Sporting Event in Columbus" by Columbus Monthly; named as the "Best New Addition to Columbus" and for the "Athlete you'd most want to drink a beer with" - Columbus Alive; Inspires a board game - "A Night at the Chill," created by team's first season ticket holder Steve Miller.
- 1993 – "Marketing Project-of-the-Year for Creativity and Impact" - Central Ohio, Chapter, American Marketing Association; Named "Best Sporting Event in Columbus" and "Best Promotion" by Columbus Monthly.
- 1994 – Team makes playoffs for first time; Ruskowski becomes the first ECHL coach to get hired as a head coach at the next level (IHL's Houston Aeros). Moe Mantha Jr. replaces Ruskowski as head coach.
- 1996 – Mantha becomes head coach of the Baltimore Bandits (later Cincinnati Mighty Ducks) of the American Hockey League. Brian McCutcheon replaces Mantha as head coach.
- 1997 – First place in North Division and third overall in ECHL (1996–97), record for most 20-or-more goal scorers in one season (9 in 70 games played: Dave Hymovitz, 39; Derek Gauthier, 33; Joe Coombs, 28; Derek Wood, 27; Keith Morris, 26; Derek Clancey, 26; Lorne Toews, 25; Matt Oates, 22; Mark Turner, 20). Brian McCutcheon named East Coast Hockey League's Coach of the Year. David Paitson awarded ECHL Executive of the Year. 1997 - McCutcheon becomes head coach of the AHL's Rochester Americans. Don Granato replaces McCutcheon as head coach.
- 1999 – First place in Northwest Division, second in Northern Conference, seventh overall in ECHL (1998–99). "Last Call" on April 4 draws 191st and final sellout. All-Time Chill Team named: Goaltender - Jeff Salajko; Defensemen - Lance Brady and Barry Dreger; Forwards - Derek Clancey, Jason "Smurf" Christie and Rob Schriner; Enforcer - Phil Crowe.

== Chill alumni and the National Hockey League ==
Five former Chill players were eventually promoted to the NHL.

- Blair Atcheynum had the longest tenure in the NHL of any of the former Chill alumni. A former Hartford Whalers' third round draft pick (52nd overall in 1989), Atychenum had a brief four game stint with the Ottawa Senators during the 1992-93 NHL season where he split time between Ottawa and New Haven. Atcheynum was assigned to the Chill for the 1993–94 season and scored 27 points in only sixteen games. He would return to the NHL with the St. Louis Blues during the 1997–98 season, where he scored a career-high 11 goals and 26 points. Atychenum would also have stops in Nashville and Chicago during his NHL career. In 196 career NHL games, Atychenum had 27 goals and 33 goals during the regular season. He scored an additional goal and three assists in 23 career playoff games.
- Phil Crowe joined the Chill during their inaugural 1991 season. He later joined the Los Angeles Kings during their 1993–94 season and also played for the Philadelphia Flyers (1995–96), Ottawa Senators (1996–99), and Nashville Predators (1999–2000). Crowe played 94 games in the NHL, scoring five goals and four assists.
- Sasha Lakovic started his professional career with the Chill in 1992. He joined the Calgary Flames during the 1996–97 season. He played 19 games with the Flames during his NHL rookie season and played an additional 18 games with the New Jersey Devils between 1997 and 1999.
- Eric Manlow played thirty-six games for the Chill during the 1996–97 season. He played his first NHL game with the Boston Bruins during the 2000–01 season and played a total of 37 NHL games from 2001 until 2004.
- Pete Vandermeer played fifty games for the Chill between 1996 and 1998. He was recalled to the then-Phoenix Coyotes on February 8, 2008, and received a second recall on April 4. Vandermeer played two career games in the NHL.

In addition, three former NHL players spent portions of their career with the Chill.

- Cam Brown was an undrafted forwarded who was briefly recalled by the Vancouver Canucks during the 1990-91 NHL season. He played one game for the Canucks and fought former Blackhawks' enforcer Mike Peluso. Brown would spend parts of two seasons with the Chill from 1991 to 1993, scoring 48 points in 46 games. Brown would go on to have a lengthy ECHL career, playing 789 regular season games in the ECHL from 1996 to 2006. Brown's 789 career ECHL games is the 4th most in ECHL history and his 2425 career PIM was an ECHL record from 2003 until it was broken by then-Jacksonville Icemen forward Garet Hunt in 2018. Brown would later be inducted into the ECHL Hall of Fame in 2010.
- Trent Kaese is a former Buffalo Sabres 8th round draft pick (161st overall, 1985) who played one game with the Sabres during the 1988-89 NHL season. He would have stops in Winston-Salem (ECHL), Phoenix (IHL), and Peterborough (BHL) before joining the Chill during the 1991–92 season. Kaese scored 28 goals and 50 points in only 28 games in his lone season with the Chill. After the completion of the season, Kaese returned to Britain to resume his BHL career for several more seasons before retiring in 1995.
- André Racicot is a goaltender who spent five seasons with the Montreal Canadiens' (1989–1994) and was the backup goalie for the Stanley Cup-winning 1993 team. Racicot was released by the Canadiens after the 1993–94 season and began a journeyman's career across the minor leagues shortly after. Racicot only played one game with the Chill during the 1995-96 ECHL season, stopping 37 out of 39 shots.

== Success and community impact ==
The Chill would send five players to the NHL and promote others to the American Hockey League and International Hockey League. Numerous Chill front office employees advanced their careers to NHL, NFL, NBA, MLB, NCAA, NASCAR, Indy Racing League, etc., including several front office employees of the Blue Jackets.

In addition to the Chill being the catalyst for the NHL coming to Columbus, the franchise provided much-needed services to the skating community. The Chill has the distinction of becoming the first minor league team to build, own, and operate its own facility (Chiller Dublin, 1993) and opened their second dual ice rink (Chiller Easton, 1997). They joined the Mighty Ducks of Anaheim as one of only two franchises at any level to own and operate two facilities.

Considered to be among the finest ice rink facilities in the United States, the Chillers provided the platform for an explosion of hockey from learn-to-skate classes to adult leagues: Nine high-school hockey programs and youth hockey participation grew from 150 to over 1,300 kids during the 1990s while the Chill was in existence. The Columbus Chill Youth Hockey Association (CCHYA)continues to thrive.

A partnership formed in 1997 between the Chill and Blue Jackets had resulted in the Chillers and the NHL club owning and managing eight sheets of ice in Central Ohio - Chiller North was added in 2003 and the Chiller Ice Works in 2005 - as well as serving as an integral marketing extension of the Blue Jackets' brand.

== Season-by-season record ==
Note: GP = Games played, W = Wins, L = Losses, T = Ties, OTL = Overtime losses, Pts = Points, GF = Goals for, GA = Goals against, PIM = Penalties in minutes
Records as per HockeyDB:

Regular Season											Playoffs				
Season	GP	W	L	OTL	SOL	Pts	GF	GA	PIM	Standing	Year	1st round	2nd round	3rd round	Riley/Kelly Cup
1991–92	64	25	30	6	3	59	298	341	2751	7th in West	1992	Did not qualify			
1992–93	64	30	30	1	3	64	257	256	2081	7th in West	1993	Did not qualify			
1993–94	68	41	20	1	6	89	344	285	1790	2nd in North	1994	W, 2–1 JHN	L, 0–3, TOL	—	—
1994–95	68	31	32	5	0	67	282	315	1589	4th in North	1995	L, 0–3 RMD	—	—	—
1995–96	70	37	28	0	5	79	285	268	2013	4th in North	1996	L, 0–3 WHL	—	—	—
1996–97	70	44	21	0	5	93	303	257	1893	1st in North	1994	W, 3–2 TOL	L, 0–3, PEO	—	—
1997–98	70	33	30	0	7	73	221	220	2173	5th in Northwest	1998	Did not qualify			
1998–99	70	39	24	0	7	85	257	242	1614	1st in Northwest	1999	L, 1–3 CHS	—	—	—

== Head coaches ==
- Terry Ruskowski (1991–94)
- Moe Mantha, Jr. (1994–96)
- Brian McCutcheon (1996–97)
- Don Granato (1997–99)

== General managers ==
- David Paitson (1991–98)
- Don Granato (1998–99)

== Players ==
=== Team Record Holders ===
- Beau Bilek - Games Played (266)
- Keith Morris - Goals (104)
- Derek Clancey - Assists (218), points (313)
- Barry Dreger - PIM (663)

=== Captains ===
- Jason Smart - Captained first Chill playoff team in 1994
- Lance Brady - Captain 1994–1995

=== ECHL Record Holders ===
- Trent Kaese *NHL - 3rd most consecutive three-or-more goal games (1992 vs. Toledo, Dayton and Knoxville)
- Matt Oates - tied for most power-play goals in a game (4 goals in 1996 at Erie)
- Jeff Salajko - tied for most saves by a goaltender, period (30 in 1997 vs. Roanoke)

=== NHL Alumni ===
- Blair Atcheynum
- Cam Brown
- Phil Crowe
- Trent Kaese
- Sasha Lakovic
- Eric Manlow
- André Racicot
- Pete Vandermeer

=== Other notable players ===
- Jason "The Smurf" Christie - former Chill forward who coached 19 seasons in the ECHL before joining the Buffalo Sabres as an assistant coach in 2021.
- Rob Schriner
- Barry Dreger
- Rob Sangster
- Corey Bricknell

== See also ==
- List of ECHL seasons
