= Paul McDonald Robinett =

U.S. Army general (1893–1975)

- Brig. Gen. Paul M. Robinett, Commander of Combat Command B, 1st Armored Division, on reconnaissance, Maknassy valley
- Education: Mountain Grove High School; BS 1917, University of Missouri, Columbia, Mo. in Agriculture; graduate fellowship 1917, Iowa State University, Ames, Iowa; attended 1925, French cavalry school, Saumur
- Height: 5 ft 4 in (1.63 m)
- Political party: Republican
- Military career
- Born: December 19, 1893; Mountain Grove, Missouri, US
- Died: February 5, 1975 (aged 81)
- Burial place: Hillcrest Cemetery, Mountain Grove
- Branch: Cavalry of the United States of America
- Service years: 1917–1946
- Rank: Brigadier General
- Nickname: Robbie
- Commands: 13th Armored Regiment (1942–1943); Task Force Green; Combat Command B, 1st Armored Division (Jan 1943 – May 1943); U.S. Army Armor School (1944–1945)
- Conflicts: Oran, Nov 1942 – Operation Torch; Tunisian Campaign
- Awards: U.S.: Distinguished Service Medal; Legion of Merit; Purple Heart; French: Legion of Honor; Croix de Guerre, 2 palms; Brazilian: Order of Military Merit Commander; Tunisian: Grand Cordon; Order of Nichan-Iftikhan; Guggenheim fellow, 1956
- Other work: 1948–1957 Chief, Special Studies Section, Office of the Chief of Military History; author

Paul McDonald Robinett (1893–1975) was a cavalry and armor officer (Brigadier General) of the U.S. Army. He spent much of his career as a staff officer, and commanded an armored regiment and combined arms combat command in combat during the Tunisian campaign of World War II.

== Biography ==
Robinett hailed from Missouri's Ozark foothills, scion of Ozark pioneers. After high school, he worked a summer in the Kansas harvest fields before enrolling in the University of Missouri, where he completed his B.S. (1917) in Agriculture. Since the U.S. had entered World War I, he tried to enlist but was rejected as underweight. After beginning a graduate fellowship at Iowa State, he again tried to enlist, unsuccessfully.

But he was accepted for officer training, subsequently commissioned a 2nd lieutenant in the 1st Cavalry. During World War I, First Cavalry served along the border with Mexico; during this time, he was promoted to first lieutenant. He was graduated from the Cavalry School Troop Commander's course at Fort Riley, Kansas in 1922, and taught Machine Gunnery and animal transportation there 1922–1923. He was a special student at the University of Paris in 1925, attended the French cavalry school at Saumur, and observed French maneuvers near Strasbourg. He was General Malin Craig's aide-de-camp 1927–1932, serving in the Panama Canal Zone and San Francisco. Captain Paul McD. Robinett, Cavalry, completed the United States Army Command and General Staff College's two-year course and graduated June 15, 1934. He attended the U.S. Army War College. He served in the War Department's General Staff 1937–1941. He was Assistant Chief of Staff for intelligence under both Lesley J. McNair (from June 26, 1941) and George C. Marshall. President F. D. Roosevelt nominated him for promotion to colonel on November 20, 1942.

His personal credo was: "Always do whatever you can to keep your superior from making a mistake." He was a crack shot with a pistol and expert rider. Only one soldier of the 3rd Infantry ever collected on his offer of a dollar to any soldier who could out shoot him. He was an accomplished horseman, a member of the U.S. Army equestrian team, and competed in the 1924 Summer Olympics in Paris.

During the Tunisian campaign of World War II he commanded the 13th Armored Regiment, "Task Force Green," and 1st Armored Division's Combat Command B. After the American defeat at the battle of Kasserine Pass, his CCB and 1st Infantry Division repulsed a German advance west on Highway 13 toward Tebessa.

General Robinett and CCB were to lead 1st Armored Division's assault from Mateur toward Bizerte at first light on Thursday morning, May 6, 1943. The day before, as Robinett was returning to CCB, the confidence of the new division commander General Harmon in Robinett diminished so much he determined to relieve him. Harmon raced after Robinett to relieve him. He caught up just after a German artillery shell had shredded Robinett's left leg. General Robinett's war was over; he had already ceded command to Colonel Clarence C. Benson.

He commanded the Armored School at Fort Knox, Kentucky until he retired at the end of the war.

The 1940 census listed him as a resident of the Kennedy-Warren Apartment Building in Washington, D.C. and later the Army Navy Club, Washington, D.C. In 1941, then Lt Col Robinett was an honorary pallbearer at the funeral of General Craig's wife.

Brigadier General Robinett was a Missouri delegate at the 1948 Republican National Convention, and served on the resolution committee's foreign affairs subcommittee.

After the Korean War, BGen Robinett complained that American military succumbed to a "natural tendency" to develop quickly capabilities to counter an enemy, rather than those to defeat and destroy him. U.S. defense developed equipment and tactics weighted too much on defensive implements. In particular, the tanks were to be used chiefly to support infantry and an insufficient number of armored divisions – more mobile and more offensive. He recalled the blitzkrieg of World War II and the North Korea's tank invasion of the South.

== Decorations ==

1st Row	Army Distinguished Service Medal		Legion of Merit		Purple Heart
2nd Row	Army Commendation Medal	American Defense Service Medal	European-African-Middle Eastern Campaign Medal	World War II Victory Medal	
3rd Row	Knight of the Legion of Honor (France)	French Croix de guerre 1939–1945 with two palms	Commander of the Order of Military Merit (Brazil)	Grand Cordon of the Order of Glory (French Tunisia)	

== Dates of rank ==
Insignia	Rank	Component	Date
	Second lieutenant	Officers' Reserve Corps	November 27, 1917 (temporary)
	First lieutenant	Regular Army	August 31, 1918 (accepted September 19, temporary); July 1, 1920 (accepted September 16, permanent)
	Captain	Regular Army	December 2, 1929
	Major	Regular Army	October 1, 1938
	Lieutenant colonel	Regular Army	February 4, 1941
	Colonel	Army of the United States	February 1, 1942
	Brigadier general	Army of the United States	November 20, 1942
	Brigadier general	Regular Army, Retired	August 31, 1946

== Publications ==
- Robinett, Paul M., Paul M. Robinett papers, 1915–1972 (bulk 1943–1957), LCCN mm75038018 3,000 items. – 10 containers. – 4 linear
- Robinett, Paul M. (n.d.), The Axis Offensive in Central Tunisia, Feb. 1943, Library of Congress
- Robinett, Paul M. (n.d.), Among the First, Lexington, Virginia: George C. Marshall Foundation
- Robinett, Paul M. (1950). Preparation for leadership in America; extracted from the writings of Cicero, Chesterfield, Franklin, Washington, Emerson, Lincoln, Schofield, and the Honor code of the United States Military Academy. Washington, D.C. LCCN 50035715.
- Luther Harris Evans, Paul McDonald Robinett Willard Webb (April 21, 1950). Library of Congress intermission broadcasts [sound recording]. Program of Applied Studies. LCCN 2003642814. 1 sound disc : analog, 33 1/3 rpm; 16 in. (preservation master)
- Robinett, Brigadier General Paul M. (March–April 1953). "Ground Force Mobility" (PDF). Armor: 6–11.
- Robinett, Paul M. (1954). The exploitation of history by the United States Army. Washington?: United States Department of the Army. Office of Military History. LCCN 55061243.
- Robinett, Paul McD., chief, Special Studies Division. The study and writing of American military history, a guide. United States Department of the Army. Office of Military History. LCCN 54060137. OCLC 7879449.
- Robinett, Paul M. (1958). Armor command; the personal story of a commander of the 13th Armored Regiment, of the CCB, 1st Armored Division, and of the Armored School during World War II. Washington, D.C. LCCN 59031974.
- Robinett, Paul M., ed. (1956). American Military History from 1607 to 1953. Office of the Chief of Military History, U.S. Department of the Army.
- Robinett, Paul M., Paul M. Robinett papers, 1915–1972 (bulk 1943–1957), LCCN mm75038018 3,000 items. – 10 containers. – 4 linear feet.
- Robinett, Paul M. (1965). Education in Mountain Grove, Missouri, 1835–1913. LCCN 75327255.

== Bibliography ==
- Murphy, Brian John (April 2006). "Facing the Fox". America in WWII magazine.
- Semmens, Colonel E. Paul. "Chapter 4 – The Battle of Kasserine Pass: Four Days to Victory". The Hammer of Hell; The Coming of Age of Antiaircraft Artillery in WW II. (Reprinted from the ADA Magazine)
- Whiting, Charles (2003). Disaster at Kasserine : Ike and the 1st (US) Army in North Africa, 1943. Barnsley, S. Yorkshire: L. Cooper. pp. 164–165, 170, 184. ISBN 0850529824. LCCN 2004396777. OCLC 51779796.
