= Scott County Courthouse (Missouri) =

Historical location in Benton, Missouri

- U.S. National Register of Historic Places
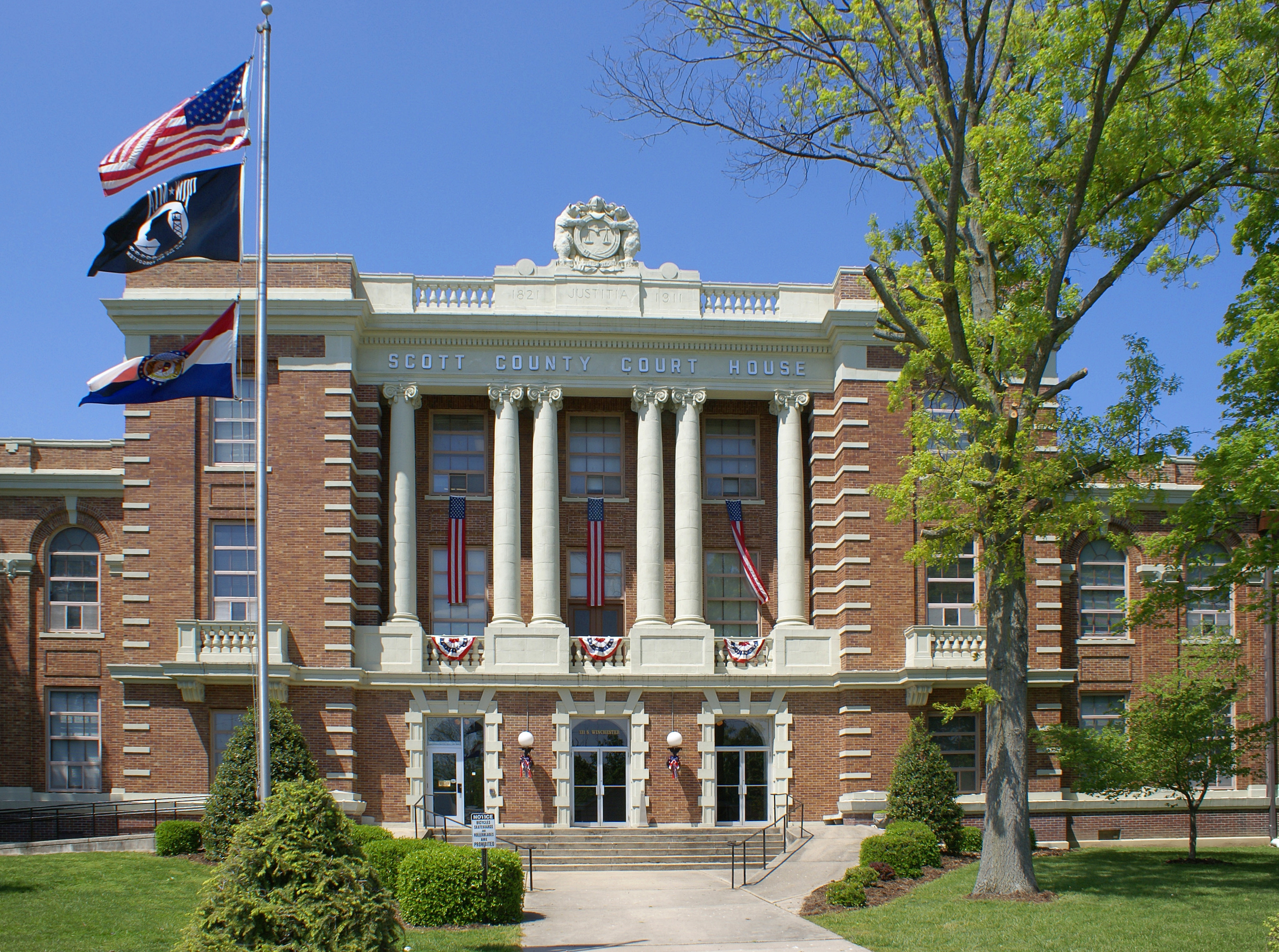

- Location within Missouri Location within the United States
- Location: 131 S. Winchester St., Benton, Missouri
- Coordinates: 37°5′48″N 89°33′50″W
- Area: 1.1 acres (0.45 ha)
- Built: 1912
- Built by: McCarthy, J.W.
- Architect: Hohenschild, H.H.
- Architectural style: Beaux Arts
- NRHP reference No.: 03001505
- Added to NRHP: January 28, 2004

Scott County Courthouse is a historic courthouse located at Benton, Scott County, Missouri. It was designed by architect Henry H. Hohenschild and built in 1912. It is a reinforced concrete Beaux Arts style building sheathed in brick. It has a "T"-plan consisting of a three-story, five-bay, central block with two-story wings. Three bays of the central block are recessed behind colossal Ionic order columns that support a dentiled entablature. It features terra cotta and cast stone ornamentation.

It was added to the National Register of Historic Places in 2004.
