= Phil Crowe (ice hockey) =

- Born: April 14, 1970 (age 55) Nanton, Alberta, Canada
- Height: 6 ft 2 in (188 cm)
- Weight: 220 lb (100 kg; 15 st 10 lb)
- Position: Right Wing
- Shot: Right
- Played for: Los Angeles Kings; Philadelphia Flyers; Ottawa Senators; Nashville Predators
- NHL draft: Undrafted
- Playing career: 1991–2004

Philip Ross Crowe (born April 14, 1970) is a Canadian former professional ice hockey winger who played in the National Hockey League for the Los Angeles Kings, Philadelphia Flyers, Ottawa Senators, and the Nashville Predators between 1994 and 2000.

== Playing career ==
Hailing from Red Deer, Alberta, Crowe played for the Olds Grizzlys of the Alberta Junior Hockey League. Undrafted, he signed as a free agent in 1993 with the Los Angeles Kings. He later played 16 games with the Philadelphia Flyers during the 1995-96 season before spending parts of three seasons with the Ottawa Senators. Crowe was claimed from Ottawa by the new Atlanta franchise in the 1999 NHL Expansion Draft on June 25, 1999, though he would never play with the team. Atlanta traded Crowe to Nashville for future considerations a day later.

Known primarily as an enforcer, Crowe played in 94 games during his NHL career and recorded four goals and five assists for nine points, while collecting 173 penalty minutes.

== Personal life ==
Since retiring from professional hockey, Crowe resides in Windsor, Colorado. He now plays in a hockey league in Northern Colorado. Crowe is the co-owner of an oil and gas directional drilling company, Total Directional based out of Windsor. He served as an assistant coach in two seasons with the Colorado Eagles.

== Career statistics ==
=== Regular season and playoffs ===
			Regular season					Playoffs
Season	Team	League	GP	G	A	Pts	PIM	GP	G	A	Pts	PIM
1988–89	Red Deer Rustlers	AJHL	41	6	4	10	142	—	—	—	—	—
1989–90	Olds Grizzlys	AJHL	47	8	21	29	248	—	—	—	—	—
1990–91	Olds Grizzlies	AJHL	50	16	24	40	290	—	—	—	—	—
1991–92	Adirondack Red Wings	AHL	6	1	0	1	29	—	—	—	—	—
1991–92	Columbus Chill	ECHL	32	4	7	11	145	—	—	—	—	—
1991–92	Toledo Storm	ECHL	2	0	0	0	0	5	0	0	0	58
1992–93	Phoenix Roadrunners	IHL	53	3	3	6	190	—	—	—	—	—
1993–94	Los Angeles Kings	NHL	31	0	2	2	77	—	—	—	—	—
1993–94	Fort Wayne Komets	IHL	5	0	1	1	26	—	—	—	—	—
1993–94	Phoenix Roadrunners	IHL	2	0	0	0	0	—	—	—	—	—
1994–95	Hershey Bears	AHL	46	11	6	17	132	6	0	1	1	19
1995–96	Philadelphia Flyers	NHL	16	1	1	2	28	—	—	—	—	—
1995–96	Hershey Bears	AHL	39	6	8	14	105	5	1	2	3	19
1996–97	Ottawa Senators	NHL	26	0	1	1	30	3	0	0	0	16
1996–97	Detroit Vipers	IHL	41	7	7	14	83	—	—	—	—	—
1997–98	Ottawa Senators	NHL	9	3	0	3	24	—	—	—	—	—
1997–98	Detroit Vipers	IHL	55	6	13	19	160	20	5	2	7	48
1998–99	Ottawa Senators	NHL	8	0	1	1	4	—	—	—	—	—
1998–99	Cincinnati Cyclones	IHL	39	2	6	8	62	—	—	—	—	—
1998–99	Detroit Vipers	IHL	2	0	0	0	9	—	—	—	—	—
1998–99	Las Vegas Thunder	IHL	14	1	3	4	18	—	—	—	—	—
1999–00	Nashville Predators	NHL	4	0	0	0	10	—	—	—	—	—
1999–00	Milwaukee Admirals	IHL	20	3	1	4	31	—	—	—	—	—
2000–01	Detroit Vipers	IHL	4	0	1	1	0	—	—	—	—	—
2001–02	Ayr Scottish Eagles	BISL	20	1	1	2	71	7	2	0	2	33
2003–04	Colorado Eagles	CHL	54	9	8	17	112	4	0	0	0	2
IHL totals			235	22	35	57	579	20	5	2	7	48
NHL totals			94	4	5	9	173	3	0	0	0	16
