= Pulaski County Courthouse (Missouri) =

- U.S. National Register of Historic Places
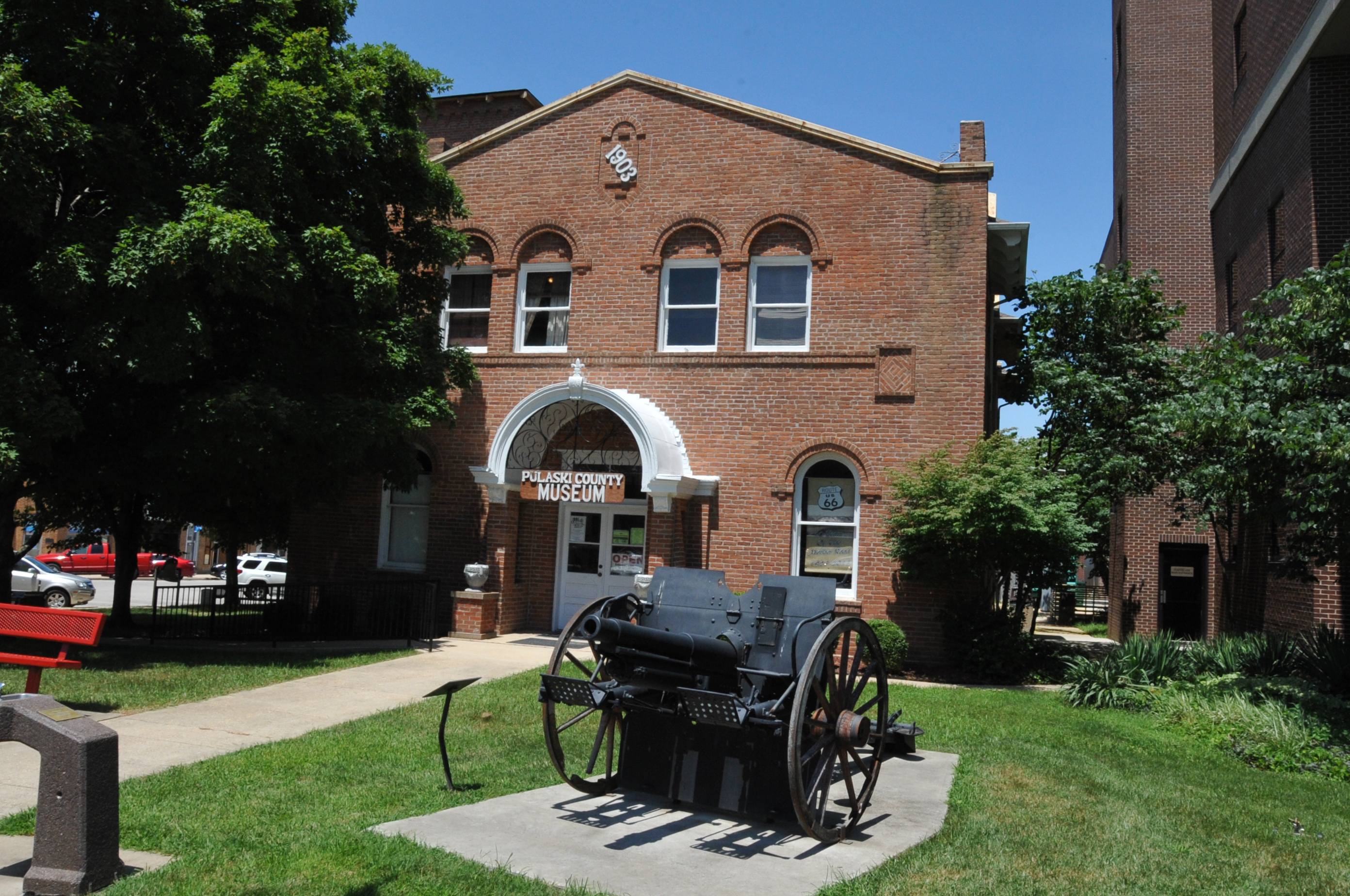
- Pulaski County Courthouse, January 2009

- Location within Missouri Location within the United States
- Interactive map showing the location for Pulaski County Courthouse
- Location: Courthouse Sq., Waynesville, Missouri
- Coordinates: 37°49′45″N 92°12′4″W
- Area: 0.2 acres (0.081 ha)
- Built: 1903
- Architect: Hohenschild, H.H.
- Architectural style: Romanesque
- NRHP reference No.: 79001391
- Added to NRHP: July 17, 1979

Pulaski County Courthouse is a historic courthouse located at Waynesville, Pulaski County, Missouri. It was designed by architect Henry H. Hohenschild and built in 1903. It is a two-story, Romanesque Revival style, red brick building on a limestone foundation. It has Italianate style detailing including rounded arched openings.

It was listed on the National Register of Historic Places in 1979.
