= North Ward School (Bolivar, Missouri) =

- U.S. National Register of Historic Places
- North Ward School in 2026

- Location within Missouri Location within the United States
- Location: 201 W. Locust St. Bolivar, Missouri
- Coordinates: 37°36′57″N 93°24′49″W
- Area: less than one acre
- Built: 1903
- Architects: Hohenschild, Henry H.
- Architectural style: Late 19th and Early 20th Century Revivals
- NRHP reference No.: 11000442
- Added to NRHP: July 14, 2011

North Ward School, also known as the Bolivar High School and Polk County North Ward Museum, is a historic school building located at Bolivar, Polk County, Missouri. It was designed by architect Henry H. Hohenschild and built in 1903. It was listed on the National Register of Historic Places in 2011.

== Background ==
It is a two-story, T-shaped, brick building with a central, four-story entrance tower flanked by slightly projecting classroom wings. It sits on a limestone block foundation and has a hipped roof. Furthermore, it features round arched and segmental arched windows. The building houses a local history museum.
