= First National Bank (Bolivar, Missouri) =

- U.S. National Register of Historic Places
- First National Bank building in 2026

- Location within Missouri Location within the United States
- Location: 103 E. Broadway, Bolivar, Missouri
- Coordinates: 37°36′51″N 93°24′42″W
- Area: less than one acre
- Built: 1907
- Architects: Wilder and Wight, Kansas City, MO
- Architectural style: Classical Revival
- NRHP reference No.: 13000839
- Added to NRHP: October 16, 2013

First National Bank, also known as the Adams & Mosier Real Estate Company, is a historic bank building located at Bolivar in Polk County, Missouri USA. It was built in 1907 and is a two-story, Classical Revival style buff brick building. It has a flat roof and a limestone foundation. It features Classical pilasters and a terra cotta cornice.

It was listed on the National Register of Historic Places in 2013.
