= Bolivar Municipal Airport =

Bolivar Municipal Airport Gene Engledow Field
- IATA: none; ICAO: none; FAA LID: M17

Summary
- Airport type: Public
- Owner: City of Bolivar
- Operator: S.O.A.R. (Service Oriented Aviation Readiness)
- Serves: Bolivar, Missouri
- Elevation AMSL: 1,092 ft (333 m)
- Coordinates: 37°35′46″N 093°20′52″W

Maps
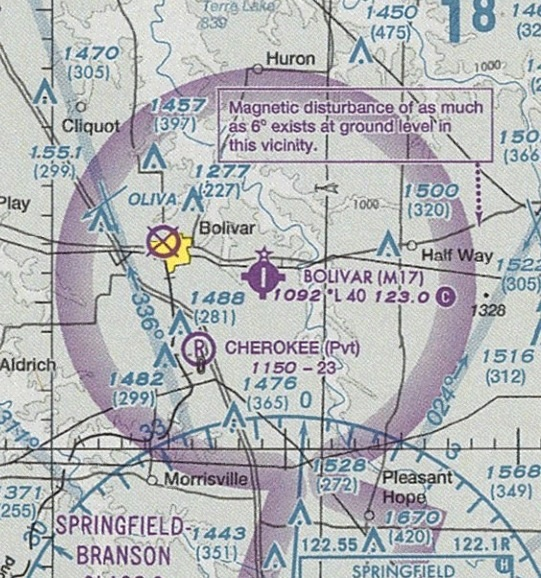

- Location within Missouri

Runways
Direction	Length		Surface
Direction	ft	m	Surface
18/36	4,000	1,219	Asphalt

Statistics (2008)
- Aircraft operations: 18,701
- Based aircraft: 61
- Source: Federal Aviation Administration

Bolivar Municipal Airport (FAA LID: M17) is a city-owned public-use airport located four nautical miles (4.6 mi; 7.4 km) east of the central business district of Bolivar, a city in Polk County, Missouri, United States. It is included in the FAA's National Plan of Integrated Airport Systems for 2011–2015, which categorized it as a general aviation facility.

== History ==
By proclamation of the mayor of the city of Bolivar, the field was renamed "Bolivar Municipal Airport, Gene Engledow Field" on October 12, 2013. The renaming was to honor Gene Engledow, a local 100-year-old master pilot. Engledow has been licensed by the FAA for 77 years as of 2013.

== Facilities and aircraft ==
Bolivar Municipal Airport covers an area of 183 acres (74 ha) at an elevation of 1,092 feet (333 m) above mean sea level. It has one runway designated 18/36 with an asphalt surface measuring 4,000 by 75 feet (1,219 by 23 m).

For the 12-month period ending May 30, 2011, the airport had 18,701 aircraft operations, an average of 51 per day: 96% general aviation, 2% air taxi, 2% military. As of October 17, 2013, there were 51 aircraft based at this airport: 45 single-engine (88%), two multi-engine (4%), three jet (6%), and one helicopter (2%).

On October 10, 2011, S.O.A.R. (Service Oriented Aviation Readiness) began service as the FBO.

== Accidents & incidents ==
- On October 7, 2018, an Airdrome Sopwith Camel had a runway excursion while attempting a go-around at the Bolivar Municipal Airport.

== See also ==
- List of airports in Missouri
