= Eric Manlow =

Canadian ice hockey player

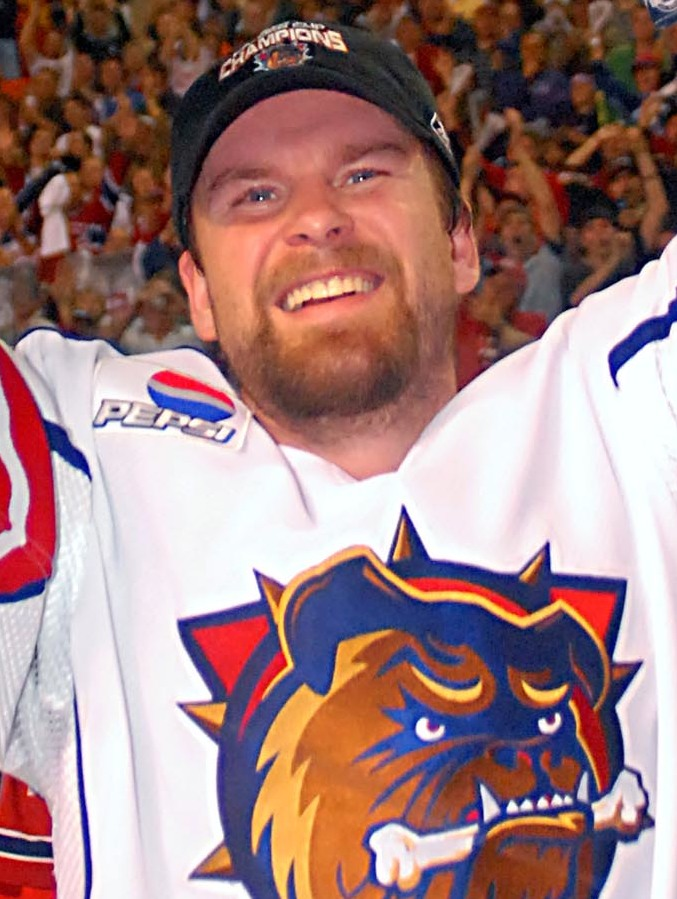
- Born: April 7, 1975 (age 49); Belleville, Ontario, Canada
- Height: 6 ft 0 in (183 cm)
- Weight: 214 lb (97 kg; 15 st 4 lb)
- Position: Centre
- Shot: Left
- Played for: Boston Bruins; New York Islanders
- NHL draft: 50th overall, 1993; Chicago Blackhawks
- Playing career: 1995–2008

Eric James Manlow (born April 7, 1975) is a Canadian former professional ice hockey player who played 37 games in the National Hockey League (NHL) with the Boston Bruins and New York Islanders.

== Playing career ==
Manlow grew up in Stirling, Ontario in his early years and played several seasons for the Stirling Blues "CC" of the OMHA's Eastern Ontario League. When he elevated to Bantam hockey, Manlow played AAA for the Peterborough Minor Petes before being drafted by the Kitchener Rangers in the 3rd round (38th overall) of the 1991 OHL Priority Selection.

He was a member of the 1994-95 OHL Champion Detroit Jr. Red Wings and participated in the 1995 Memorial Cup Finals.

Manlow played four years in the OHL with both Kitchener and the Detroit Junior Red Wings. He was a 2nd round draft pick (50th overall) by the Chicago Blackhawks in the 1993 NHL Entry Draft. He played for a number of minor-league teams—the Indianapolis Ice and the Long Beach Ice Dogs of the IHL, the Columbus Chill and the Florida Everblades of the ECHL, the Baltimore Bandits and the Providence Bruins of the AHL—before making his NHL debut with Boston. He bounced between the NHL and the AHL for the next 4 seasons, playing for the Bridgeport Sound Tigers and Grand Rapids Griffins in addition to New York, before spending 4 seasons in the AHL with Grand Rapids and the Hamilton Bulldogs, with whom he won the Calder Cup in 2007.

Manlow is now a constable for the Niagara Region police and lives in Niagara Falls, Ontario.

== Career statistics ==
			Regular season					Playoffs
Season	Team	League	GP	G	A	Pts	PIM	GP	G	A	Pts	PIM
1990–91	Peterborough Legionnaires	OMHA	59	67	51	118	90	—	—	—	—	—
1991–92	Kitchener Rangers	OHL	59	12	20	32	17	14	2	5	7	10
1992–93	Kitchener Rangers	OHL	53	26	21	47	31	4	0	1	1	2
1993–94	Kitchener Rangers	OHL	49	28	32	60	25	3	0	1	1	4
1994–95	Kitchener Rangers	OHL	44	25	29	54	26	—	—	—	—	—
1994–95	Detroit Junior Red Wings	OHL	16	4	16	20	11	21	11	10	21	18
1995–96	Indianapolis Ice	IHL	75	6	11	17	32	4	0	1	1	4
1996–97	Columbus Chill	ECHL	32	18	18	36	20	—	—	—	—	—
1996–97	Baltimore Bandits	AHL	36	6	6	12	13	3	0	0	0	0
1997–98	Indianapolis Ice	IHL	60	8	11	19	25	3	1	0	1	0
1998–99	Long Beach Ice Dogs	IHL	51	9	19	28	30	8	0	0	0	8
1998–99	Florida Everblades	ECHL	18	8	15	23	11	—	—	—	—	—
1999–00	Florida Everblades	ECHL	26	14	24	38	24	—	—	—	—	—
1999–00	Providence Bruins	AHL	46	17	16	33	14	14	6	8	14	8
2000–01	Providence Bruins	AHL	60	16	51	67	18	17	6	7	13	6
2000–01	Boston Bruins	NHL	8	0	1	1	2	—	—	—	—	—
2001–02	Providence Bruins	AHL	70	13	35	48	30	2	0	0	0	2
2001–02	Boston Bruins	NHL	3	0	0	0	0	—	—	—	—	—
2002–03	Bridgeport Sound Tigers	AHL	62	19	40	59	58	9	0	6	6	2
2002–03	New York Islanders	NHL	8	2	1	3	4	—	—	—	—	—
2003–04	Bridgeport Sound Tigers	AHL	40	8	27	35	16	1	0	0	0	2
2003–04	New York Islanders	NHL	18	0	2	2	2	—	—	—	—	—
2004–05	Grand Rapids Griffins	AHL	61	21	20	41	24	—	—	—	—	—
2005–06	Grand Rapids Griffins	AHL	80	25	48	73	44	16	3	3	6	12
2006–07	Hamilton Bulldogs	AHL	60	5	13	18	28	22	6	5	11	10
2007–08	Hamilton Bulldogs	AHL	76	12	18	30	30	—	—	—	—	—
NHL totals			37	2	4	6	8	—	—	—	—	—

== Awards and honours ==
Award	Year
AHL
All-Star Game	2001
Calder Cup (Hamilton Bulldogs)	2007
J. Ross Robertson Cup (Detroit Jr. Red Wings)	1995
