= Cam Brown (ice hockey) =

Canadian ice hockey player (1969–2025)

- Born: May 15, 1969 Saskatoon, Saskatchewan, Canada
- Died: October 25, 2025 (aged 56) Blue Ridge, Georgia, U.S.
- Height: 6 ft 1 in (185 cm)
- Weight: 185 lb (84 kg; 13 st 3 lb)
- Position: Left wing
- Shot: Left
- Played for: Vancouver Canucks
- NHL draft: Undrafted
- Playing career: 1990–2005

Richard Cameron Brown (May 15, 1969 – October 25, 2025) was a Canadian professional ice hockey left winger who played one game for the Vancouver Canucks of the National Hockey League (NHL) during the 1990–91 season.

== Early life ==
Brown was born in Saskatoon, Saskatchewan, on May 15, 1969. He played junior hockey with the Weyburn Red Wings and the Brandon Wheat Kings.

== Career ==
In 2009, Brown was named to the ECHL Hall of Fame Class of 2010 and was inducted into the ECHL Hall of Fame during the 2010 ECHL All-Star Game in Ontario, California. He was the ECHL's all-time leader in penalty minutes until surpassed by Garet Hunt in the 2018–19 ECHL season.

== Death ==
Brown died in a motorcycle collision in Blue Ridge, Georgia, on October 25, 2025, at the age of 56.

== Career statistics ==
			Regular season					Playoffs
Season	Team	League	GP	G	A	Pts	PIM	GP	G	A	Pts	PIM
1987–88	Brandon Wheat Kings	WHL	69	2	13	15	185	4	1	1	2	15
1988–89	Brandon Wheat Kings	WHL	72	17	42	59	225	—	—	—	—	—
1989–90	Brandon Wheat Kings	WHL	68	34	41	75	182	—	—	—	—	—
1990–91	Milwaukee Admirals	IHL	74	11	13	24	218	3	0	0	0	0
1990–91	Vancouver Canucks	NHL	1	0	0	0	7	—	—	—	—	—
1991–92	Columbus Chill	ECHL	10	11	6	17	64	—	—	—	—	—
1991–92	Milwaukee Admirals	IHL	51	6	8	14	179	1	0	0	0	0
1992–93	Columbus Chill	ECHL	36	13	18	31	218	—	—	—	—	—
1992–93	Erie Panthers	ECHL	15	4	3	7	50	5	0	1	1	62
1992–93	Hamilton Canucks	AHL	1	0	0	0	2	—	—	—	—	—
1992–93	Rochester Americans	AHL	4	0	0	0	26	—	—	—	—	—
1993–94	Olomouc HC	CZE	42	1	0	1	0	—	—	—	—	—
1994–95	Erie Panthers	ECHL	60	14	28	42	341	—	—	—	—	—
1994–95	Adirondack Red Wings	AHL	10	0	1	1	30	4	0	0	0	24
1995–96	Erie Panthers	ECHL	64	18	26	44	307	—	—	—	—	—
1996–97	Baton Rouge Kingfish	ECHL	57	10	13	23	220	—	—	—	—	—
1997–98	Baton Rouge Kingfish	ECHL	62	18	19	37	205	—	—	—	—	—
1998–99	Baton Rouge Kingfish	ECHL	68	17	23	40	213	6	6	1	7	42
1999–00	Baton Rouge Kingfish	ECHL	70	23	38	61	194	2	2	0	2	9
2000–01	Baton Rouge Kingfish	ECHL	71	18	28	46	131	2	0	0	0	2
2001–02	Baton Rouge Kingfish	ECHL	65	17	37	54	141	—	—	—	—	—
2003–04	Gwinnett Gladiators	ECHL	72	20	21	41	152	13	2	5	7	12
2004–05	Gwinnett Gladiators	ECHL	68	14	19	33	88	8	1	2	3	12
2005–06	Gwinnett Gladiators	ECHL	71	9	14	23	101	17	2	8	10	30
ECHL totals			789	206	293	499	2425	53	13	17	30	169
NHL totals			1	0	0	0	7	—	—	—	—	—

== See also ==
- List of players who played only one game in the NHL
