= Ozark Courthouse Square Historic District (Ozark, Missouri) =

Historic district in Missouri, United States

- U.S. National Register of Historic Places
- U.S. Historic district
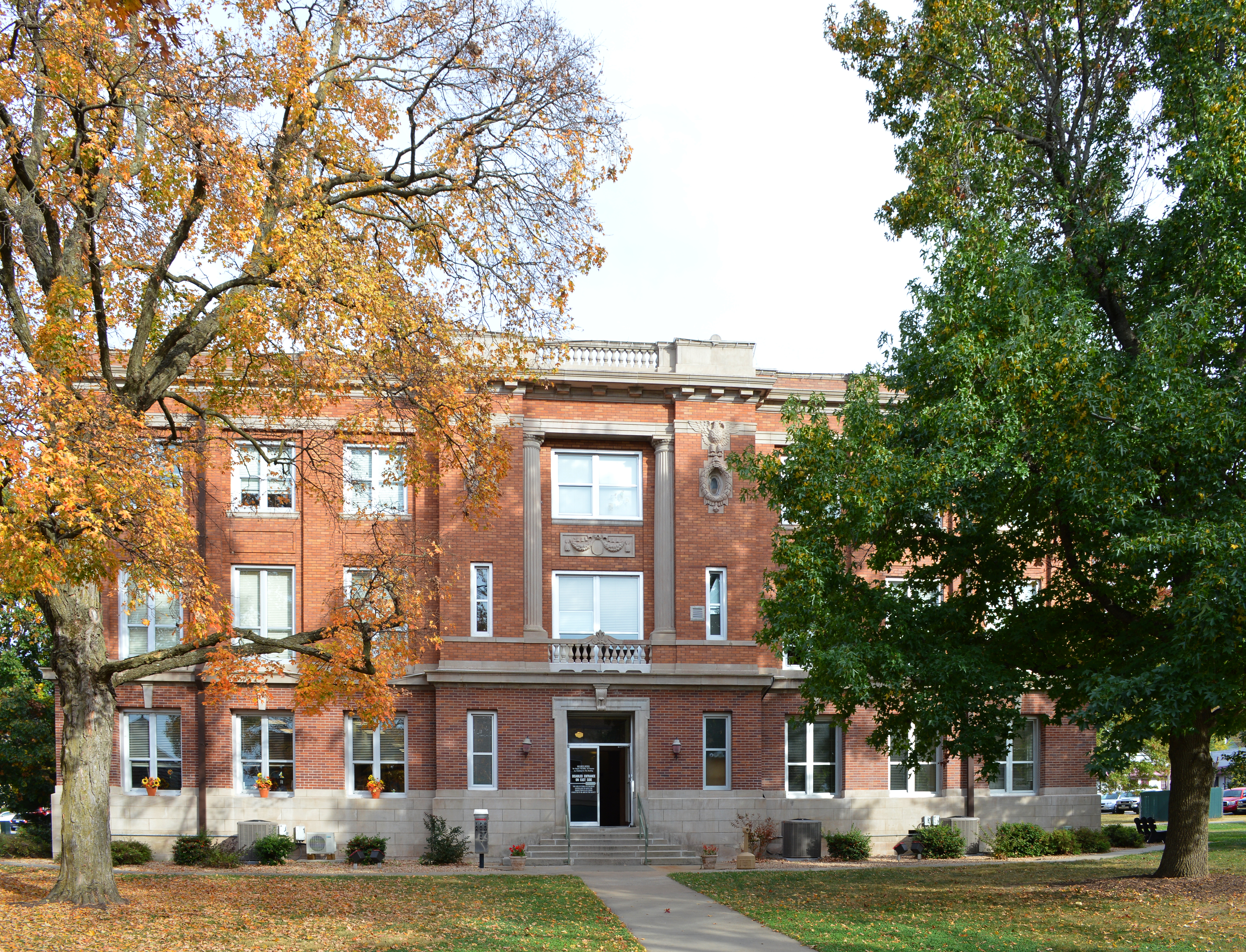
- Christian County Courthouse, October 2015

- Location within Missouri Location within the United States
- Location: Portions of 2nd. Ave., Church, Elm, and 2nd Sts. on the Courthouse Square, Ozark, Missouri
- Coordinates: 37°01′11″N 93°12′29″W
- Area: 5.3 acres (2.1 ha)
- Architect: Hohenschild, Henry H.; Russell, Don
- Architectural style: Late 19th and Early 20th Century American Movements, Commercial block
- NRHP reference No.: 08001409
- Added to NRHP: February 5, 2009

The Ozark Courthouse Square Historic District is a national historic district located at Ozark, Christian County, Missouri. It encompasses 19 contributing buildings in a 5.3-acre (2.1 ha) area in the central business district of Ozark. The central feature of the district, the Christian County Courthouse, is a three-story, Classical Revival style brick building designed by architect Henry H. Hohenschild. Other notable buildings include the Bank of Ozark/Masonic Lodge (1897), First Baptist Church (1919), Methodist Episcopal Church (1914), Robertson Brothers’ Store (1882), Ozark Drug (1905), Works Progress Administration Community Building (1934), Hospital (c. 1945), and Christian County Bank (c. 1886, 1910 façade).

It was listed on the National Register of Historic Places in 2009.
