= Mountain Grove City Hall =

- U.S. National Register of Historic Places
- Location within Missouri Location within the United States
- Location: 301 E. 1st Street, Mountain Grove, Missouri, U.S.
- Coordinates: 37°07′45″N 92°15′41″W
- Area: less than one acre
- Built: 1937-1938
- Built by: Sullivan, James Rufus
- Architect: Biddle, Cecil Wesley
- Architectural style: WPA Modern
- NRHP reference No.: 12000050
- Added to NRHP: February 28, 2012

Mountain Grove City Hall, also known as Mountain Grove City Hall and Jail, is a historic city hall located at Mountain Grove, Missouri, United States. It was built in 1937–1938, and is a two-story, flat-roofed building in the Works Progress Administration (WPA)'s version of Modern style, WPA Moderne. The building is clad in unfinished native field stone with beaded mortar joints, a technique commonly referred to as "Ozark rock" or "giraffe rock" construction. It was funded by the WPA and constructed with local labor.

It was listed on the National Register of Historic Places in 2012.
