= Bolivar, Missouri =

City in Missouri, U.S.

- City
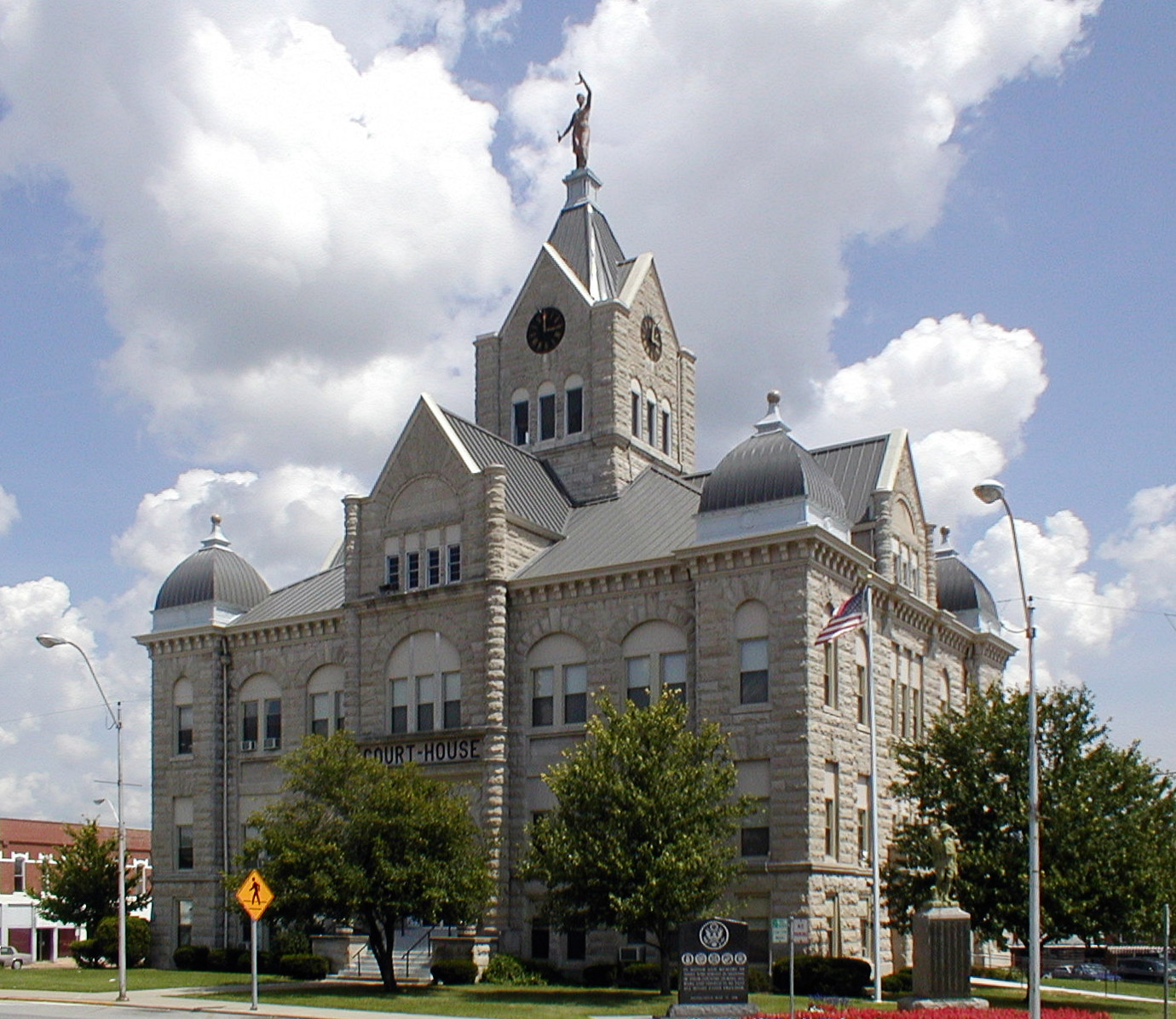
- Polk County Courthouse, 2004

- Location of Bolivar, Missouri
- Coordinates: 37°36′22″N 93°25′05″W
- Country: United States
- State: Missouri
- County: Polk

Area
  - Total: 8.24 sq mi (21.34 km^{2})
  - Land: 8.22 sq mi (21.29 km^{2})
  - Water: 0.019 sq mi (0.05 km^{2})
- Elevation: 1,070 ft (330 m)

Population (United States census)
  - Total: 11,994
  - Density: 1,299.1/sq mi (501.57/km^{2})
- Time zone: UTC-6 (Central (CST))
  - Summer (DST): UTC-5 (CDT)
- ZIP codes: 65613, 65727
- Area code: 417
- FIPS code: 29-06976
- GNIS feature ID: 2394216
- Website: Bolivar, Missouri

Bolivar (/ˈbɒlɪvər/ BOL-iv-ər) is a city in and the county seat of Polk County, Missouri, United States. The city derives its name in-part from the South American revolutionary Simón Bolívar. according to the U.S. Census Bureau, Bolivar had a population of 11,994.

== History ==
Bolivar began as a settlement around Keeling Spring, with the majority of settlers being from Hardeman County, Tennessee. The settlement became part of Greene County, Missouri when that county was organized in 1833. After the northern part of Greene County was ceded to form Polk County, Missouri, the Polk County Court proclaimed the settlement as a city, named it Bolivar, and designated it as the county seat on 10 November 1835. Bolivar was re-organized as a fourth-class city on 15 February 1881. Bolivar was a full Stop on the Butterfield Overland Mail Period 1858–1861 at the old Franklin Hotel and Relay Station. The town layout was along the Boonville road that was the main road through the area during that time.

Bolivar experienced growth in 1884 when the St. Louis–San Francisco Railway was extended to that point.

The name "Bolivar" was proposed by John Polk Campbell and his brothers William St. Clair and Ezekiel Madison. It is named after Bolivar, Tennessee, where their grandfather and Continental Army Colonel Ezekiel Polk had lived. In the 1830s, Polk and Bolivar names were locally associated with liberation. As such, Bolivar, Missouri is an indirect namesake of Simón Bolívar.

The Bolivar Public Library, First National Bank, and North Ward School are listed on the National Register of Historic Places.

== Demographics ==
Historical population
Census	Pop.	Note	%±
1860	409		—
1870	635		55.3%
1880	516		−18.7%
1890	1,485		187.8%
1900	1,869		25.9%
1910	1,975		5.7%
1920	1,980		0.3%
1930	2,256		13.9%
1940	2,636		16.8%
1950	3,482		32.1%
1960	3,512		0.9%
1970	4,769		35.8%
1980	5,919		24.1%
1990	6,845		15.6%
2000	9,143		33.6%
2010	10,325		12.9%
2020	10,679		3.4%
U.S. Decennial Census

Bolivar is part of the Springfield, Missouri Metropolitan Area.

=== 2020 census ===
As of the 2020 census, Bolivar had a population of 10,679. The population density was 1,299.1 per square mile (501.6/km^{2}).

95.8% of residents lived in urban areas, while 4.2% lived in rural areas.

There were 4,134 households in Bolivar, including 2,439 families, of which 30.1% had children under the age of 18 living in them. Of all households, 40.7% were married-couple households, 17.4% were households with a male householder and no spouse or partner present, and 35.2% were households with a female householder and no spouse or partner present. About 35.0% of all households were made up of individuals and 16.1% had someone living alone who was 65 years of age or older. The average household size was 2.4 and the average family size was 3.0.

There were 4,602 housing units, of which 10.2% were vacant. The homeowner vacancy rate was 3.5% and the rental vacancy rate was 7.0%.

The median age was 33.1 years. 23.4% of residents were under the age of 18 and 18.6% of residents were 65 years of age or older; 21.7% were from 18 to 24, 23.3% were from 25 to 44, and 16.0% were from 45 to 64. For every 100 females there were 87.5 males, and for every 100 females age 18 and over there were 82.4 males age 18 and over.

Racial composition as of the 2020 census
Race	Number	Percent
White	9,609	90.0%
Black or African American	190	1.8%
American Indian and Alaska Native	76	0.7%
Asian	80	0.7%
Native Hawaiian and Other Pacific Islander	4	0.0%
Some other race	94	0.9%
Two or more races	626	5.9%
Hispanic or Latino (of any race)	374	3.5%

=== Income and poverty ===
The 2016–2020 5-year American Community Survey estimates show that the median household income was $37,500 (with a margin of error of +/- $4,108) and the median family income was $44,432 (+/- $6,211). Males had a median income of $23,923 (+/- $5,890) versus $13,886 (+/- $1,286) for females. The median income for those above 16 years old was $17,151 (+/- $2,224). Approximately, 12.1% of families and 19.1% of the population were below the poverty line, including 15.2% of those under the age of 18 and 9.6% of those ages 65 or over.

=== 2010 census ===
As of the census of 2010, there were 10,325 people, 3,970 households, and 2,342 families living in the city. The population density was 1,247.0 inhabitants per square mile (481.5/km^{2}). There were 4,432 housing units at an average density of 535.3 units per square mile (206.7 units/km^{2}). The racial makeup of the city was 94.8% White, 1.5% African American, 0.5% Native American, 0.6% Asian, 0.7% from other races, and 1.8% from two or more races. Hispanic or Latino people of any race were 2.5% of the population.

There were 3,970 households, of which 29.2% had children under the age of 18 living with them, 43.3% were married couples living together, 11.6% had a female householder with no husband present, 4.0% had a male householder with no wife present, and 41.0% were non-families. 33.7% of all households were made up of individuals, and 16.2% had someone living alone who was 65 years of age or older. The average household size was 2.29 and the average family size was 2.92.

The median age in the city was 30.3 years. 21.7% of residents were under the age of 18; 20.8% were between the ages of 18 and 24; 22.1% were from 25 to 44; 17.6% were from 45 to 64; and 17.7% were 65 years of age or older. The gender makeup of the city was 46.5% male and 53.5% female.

=== 2000 census ===
As of the census of 2000, there were 9,143 people, 3,318 households, and 2,067 families living in the city. The population density was 1,458.8 inhabitants per square mile (563.2/km^{2}). There were 3,636 housing units at an average density of 580.1 units per square mile (224.0 units/km^{2}). The racial makeup of the city was 96.50% White, 0.86% African American, 0.60% Native American, 0.38% Asian, 0.04% Pacific Islander, 0.42% from other races, and 1.19% from two or more races. Hispanic or Latino people of any race were 1.40% of the population.

There were 3,318 households, out of which 29.0% had children under the age of 18 living with them, 48.8% were married couples living together, 10.8% had a female householder with no husband present, and 37.7% were non-families. 30.2% of all households were made up of individuals, and 15.0% had someone living alone who was 65 years of age or older. The average household size was 2.34 and the average family size was 2.89.

In the city, the population was spread out, with 20.8% under the age of 18, 23.9% from 18 to 24, 22.1% from 25 to 44, 14.7% from 45 to 64, and 18.6% who were 65 years of age or older. The median age was 29 years. For every 100 females, there were 83.6 males. For every 100 females age 18 and over, there were 78.7 males.

The median income for a household in the city was $24,609, and the median income for a family was $35,716. Males had a median income of $25,731 versus $18,618 for females. The per capita income for the city was $13,654. About 11.0% of families and 19.8% of the population were below the poverty line, including 22.5% of those under age 18 and 11.7% of those age 65 or over.

== Geography ==
Bolivar is located in Marion Township. According to the United States Census Bureau, the city has a total area of 8.30 square miles (21.50 km^{2}), of which 8.28 square miles (21.45 km^{2}) is land and 0.02 square miles (0.05 km^{2}) is water.

=== Climate ===
Climate data for Bolivar, Missouri (1991–2020 normals, extremes 1900–present)
Month	Jan	Feb	Mar	Apr	May	Jun	Jul	Aug	Sep	Oct	Nov	Dec	Year
Record high °F (°C)	77 (25)	86 (30)	90 (32)	93 (34)	100 (38)	104 (40)	115 (46)	108 (42)	108 (42)	98 (37)	87 (31)	77 (25)	115 (46)
Mean daily maximum °F (°C)	42.8 (6.0)	47.9 (8.8)	57.5 (14.2)	67.6 (19.8)	75.9 (24.4)	84.3 (29.1)	89.1 (31.7)	88.4 (31.3)	81.0 (27.2)	69.8 (21.0)	57.1 (13.9)	46.4 (8.0)	67.3 (19.6)
Daily mean °F (°C)	32.2 (0.1)	36.6 (2.6)	45.8 (7.7)	55.5 (13.1)	65.1 (18.4)	73.7 (23.2)	78.0 (25.6)	76.8 (24.9)	68.8 (20.4)	57.1 (13.9)	45.7 (7.6)	36.1 (2.3)	56.0 (13.3)
Mean daily minimum °F (°C)	21.7 (−5.7)	25.4 (−3.7)	34.0 (1.1)	43.5 (6.4)	54.2 (12.3)	63.0 (17.2)	67.0 (19.4)	65.2 (18.4)	56.6 (13.7)	44.5 (6.9)	34.3 (1.3)	25.7 (−3.5)	44.6 (7.0)
Record low °F (°C)	−25 (−32)	−19 (−28)	−7 (−22)	16 (−9)	21 (−6)	39 (4)	44 (7)	36 (2)	19 (−7)	17 (−8)	−1 (−18)	−19 (−28)	−25 (−32)
Average precipitation inches (mm)	2.31 (59)	2.25 (57)	3.59 (91)	4.96 (126)	5.90 (150)	4.88 (124)	4.62 (117)	3.71 (94)	4.25 (108)	3.79 (96)	3.42 (87)	2.70 (69)	46.38 (1,178)
Average precipitation days (≥ 0.01 in)	7.7	7.7	10.5	11.0	12.7	10.7	8.5	7.6	7.8	9.3	8.8	7.4	109.7
Source: NOAA

== Education ==
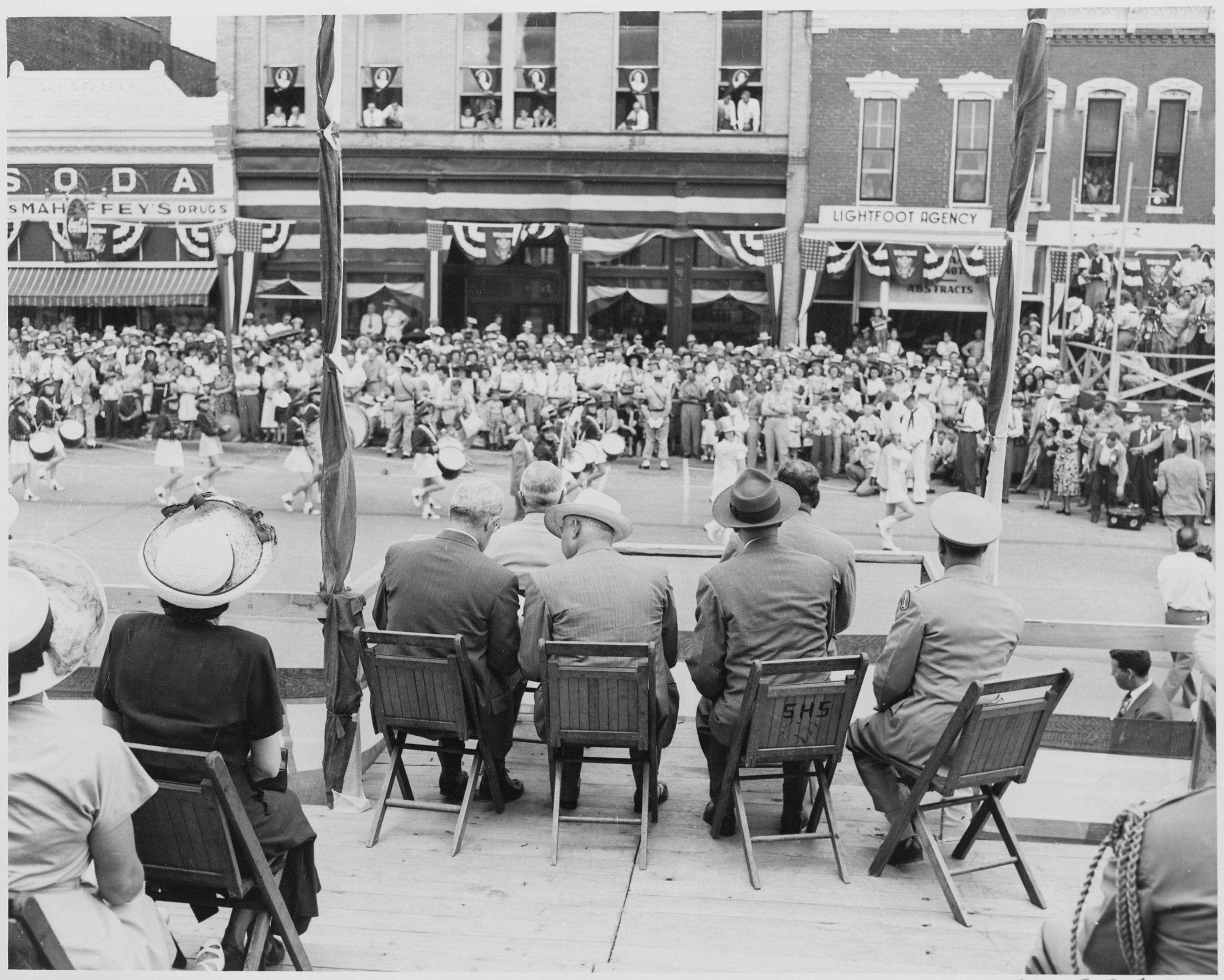
Harry S. Truman in Bolivar, 1948

Bolivar R-I School District operates one primary school, one intermediate school, one middle school, and Bolivar High School.

Southwest Baptist University, a private institution, has been in operation at Bolivar since 1879.

Bolivar has a public library, a branch of the Polk County Library.

== Media ==
- Bolivar Herald-Free Press

== Infrastructure ==
The Bolivar Municipal Airport is located four nautical miles (4.6 mi; 7.4 km) east of Bolivar's central business district.

Intercity bus service to the city is provided by Jefferson Lines.

== Notable people ==
- John Blake, Irish-American soldier, freedom fighter, and lecturer
- Mike Parson, Governor of Missouri (2018–2025)
- Benjamin "Coach" Wade, a contestant on four seasons of the TV show Survivor

== See also ==
- List of cities in Missouri
