= Ozark Mountain Sports Complex =

Baseball stadium in the U.S. state of Missouri

- Location within Missouri
- Former names: U.S. Baseball Park/Price Cutter Park (before 2016)
- Address: 4400 N 19th St, Ozark, Missouri 65721
- Location: Christian County, Missouri
- Coordinates: 37.06042°N 93.22601°W
- Owner: SWMO Baseball Properties
- Capacity: 4,000
- Executive suites: 2
- Surface: Artificial turf (since 2016)
- Scoreboard: Yes (Jumbotron)

Construction
- Built: 1999
- Opened: July 10, 1999
- Renovated: 2016

Ozark Mountain Sports Complex (formerly known as U.S. Baseball Park and Price Cutter Park) is a baseball park in Christian County, Missouri. It is located off U.S. Route 65 in Ozark, Missouri, just south of Missouri's third-largest city, Springfield.

== History ==
The facility was built in four months in early 1999 and was originally named after a local supermarket company. It opened on July 10, 1999, hosting a game of the Texas–Louisiana League, an independent baseball league.

The playing surface was rededicated as John Pittman Field in 2009, named for a primary designer of the ballpark. In 2024 the stadium was renamed Ozark Mountain Sports Complex.

=== Professional Baseball ===
The ballpark was home to the Springfield/Ozark Mountain Ducks team that was part of several independent leagues (the Texas–Louisiana League, Central Baseball League, and in their final year, the Frontier League when they were known as the Springfield/Ozark Ducks). The Ducks discontinued playing in 2004 after the El Paso Diablos of the Double-A Texas League within Minor League Baseball relocated to become the Springfield Cardinals, playing their home games at Route 66 Stadium (formerly Hammons Field) in downtown Springfield.

=== College Baseball ===
The Southwest Missouri State Bears baseball team played select games at the facility starting in April 2000. Ryan Howard was one of the Bears who played at the ballpark. In 2003, the Bears moved from Price Cutter Park to the new Hammons Field in downtown Springfield.

In June 2006, organized baseball returned briefly to the stadium with the Ozark Generals of the M.I.N.K. Collegiate Baseball League.

For many years the Drury University Panthers Baseball Team used the stadium as their home field until 2024.

Starting in 2022 the stadium became the home of the Mission University Patriots Baseball Team.

In 2024 the stadium became the home of the Mission University Patriots Softball Team.

=== High School Baseball ===
The stadium hosts various high school baseball games throughout the fall and spring baseball seasons.

The stadium is the host of the MSHSAA State Baseball tournament for the years 2020-2025.

=== Youth Baseball ===
In 2009, the Springfield Metro Baseball League moved into the stadium and began play. The open registration league operated in the park with 19 & under, 15 & under, and 12 & under divisions through 2014. Players registered starting each January and new teams are drafted each year in April. The summer season ran from mid-May through the end of July. A fall league also operated on weekends in September and October. The league's annual ceremonies in May had been host to a number of former Major League Baseball (MLB) players including Jack Clark, Willie Wilson, and others. Every third year (2011, 2014) the league ran a unique "retro" season with all the teams outfitted as MLB teams of the past including teams like the St. Louis Browns, Kansas City Athletics, and Washington Senators. The 2014 season was the first where the league operated entirely with wooden bats only. Just prior to the beginning of the 2015 season, the league was informed that the ballpark ownership and the city of Ozark were negotiating with fledgling semi-pro baseball leagues, and Springfield Metro Baseball relocated to ballparks on the near west side of Springfield (Barnhouse & Optimist Fields). No baseball ended up taking place at Price Cutter Park in 2015.

=== Revival ===
In 2016, the facility was purchased by U.S. Baseball, who became the owner and operator. They invested $2 million to renovate the ballpark, including a new artificial surface, a new scoreboard, and upgraded concessions and press box.

Renamed as U.S. Baseball Park, the facility again began hosting some college baseball games, starting with a contest between Drury University and William Jewell College in April. U.S. Baseball also used the ballpark to host the Show Me League, a four-team collegiate wooden-bat summer league. The facility also hosts Missouri high school state tournaments, and is used by the Queen City Crush, a team in the Fellowship of Christian Athletes baseball league.

As of 2022, the ballpark serves as the home field of the Drury Panthers baseball team.
