= Mountain Grove Bandstand =

- U.S. National Register of Historic Places
- Location within Missouri Location within the United States
- Location: Main and Second Streets, Mountain Grove, Missouri, U.S.
- Coordinates: 37°7′46″N 92°15′44″W
- Area: less than one acre
- Built: 1915
- Built by: Reed, George F.; Kirkpatrick Brothers
- Architectural style: Bungalow/craftsman
- NRHP reference No.: 88003218
- Added to NRHP: January 19, 1989

Mountain Grove Bandstand is a historic bandstand located in the town square in Mountain Grove, Missouri, United States. It was built in 1915, and is a stucco covered American Craftsman style open bandstand. It is a small square structure measuring 14 feet, 3 inches, on a side. It was dedicated by Vice President Thomas R. Marshall.

It was listed on the National Register of Historic Places in 1989.
