= Administration Building, Missouri State Fruit Experiment Station =

- U.S. National Register of Historic Places
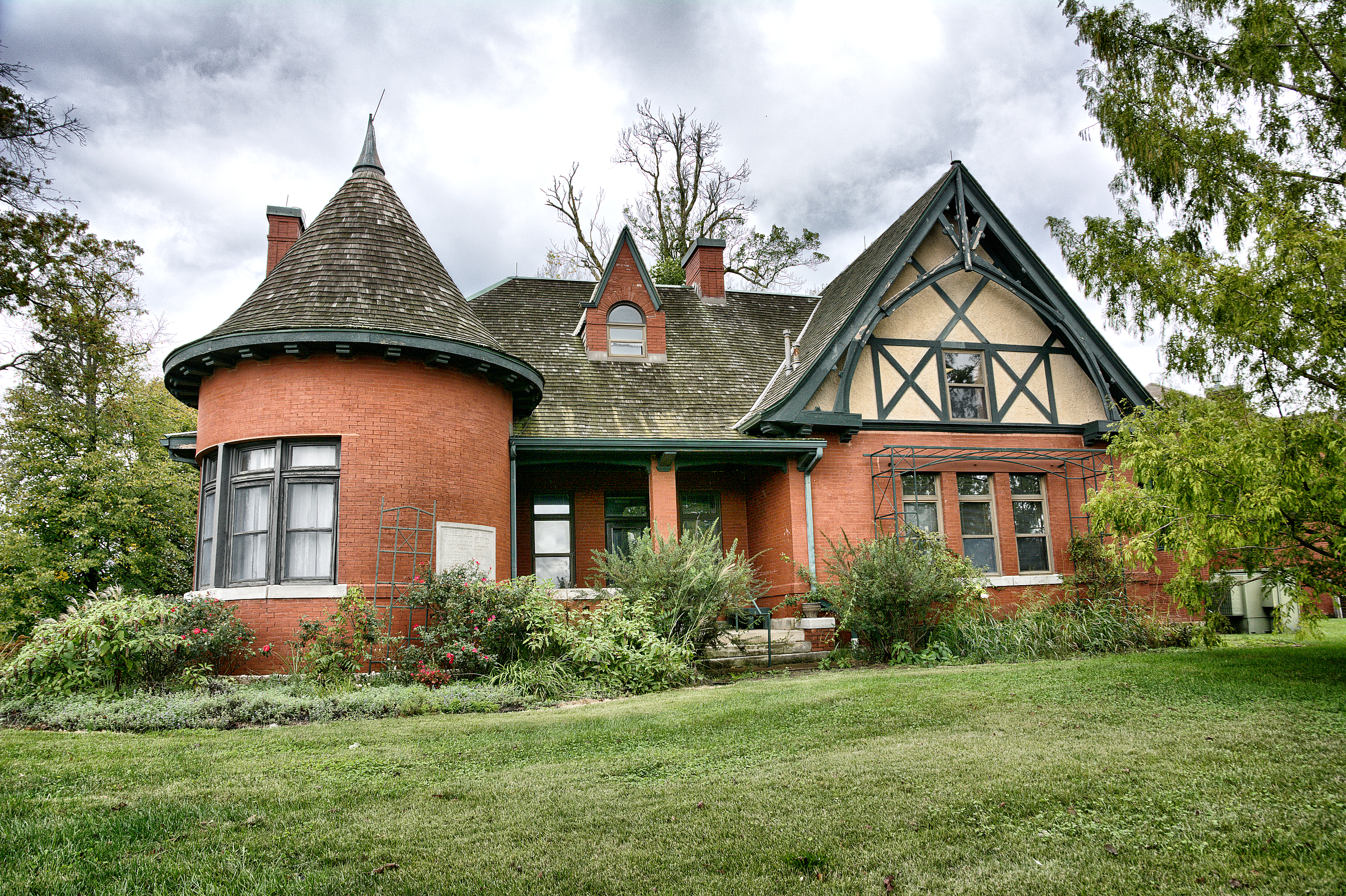

- Location within Missouri Location within the United States
- Nearest city: North of Mountain Grove off U.S. Route 60, near Mountain Grove, Missouri
- Coordinates: 37°9′11″N 92°15′45″W
- Area: 1.3 acres (0.53 ha)
- Built: 1900
- Architect: Henry H. Hohenschild
- Architectural style: Tudor Revival
- NRHP reference No.: 79001398
- Added to NRHP: January 12, 1979

Administration Building, Missouri State Fruit Experiment Station, also known as the Old Administration Building, is a historic experiment station building located near Mountain Grove, Wright County, Missouri. It was designed by architect Henry H. Hohenschild and built in 1900. It is a 1 1/2-story, Tudor Revival style red brick building on a limestone block foundation. It measures 42 feet 5 inches (12.93 m) by 59 feet 10 inches (18.24 m). The building features a bellcast roof with pedimented gables, large scrolled brackets, and a squat round corner tower with a conical roof.

It was listed on the National Register of Historic Places in 1979.
