= Mountain Grove, Missouri =

City in Wright and Texas counties in Missouri, United States

- City
- City of Mountain Grove
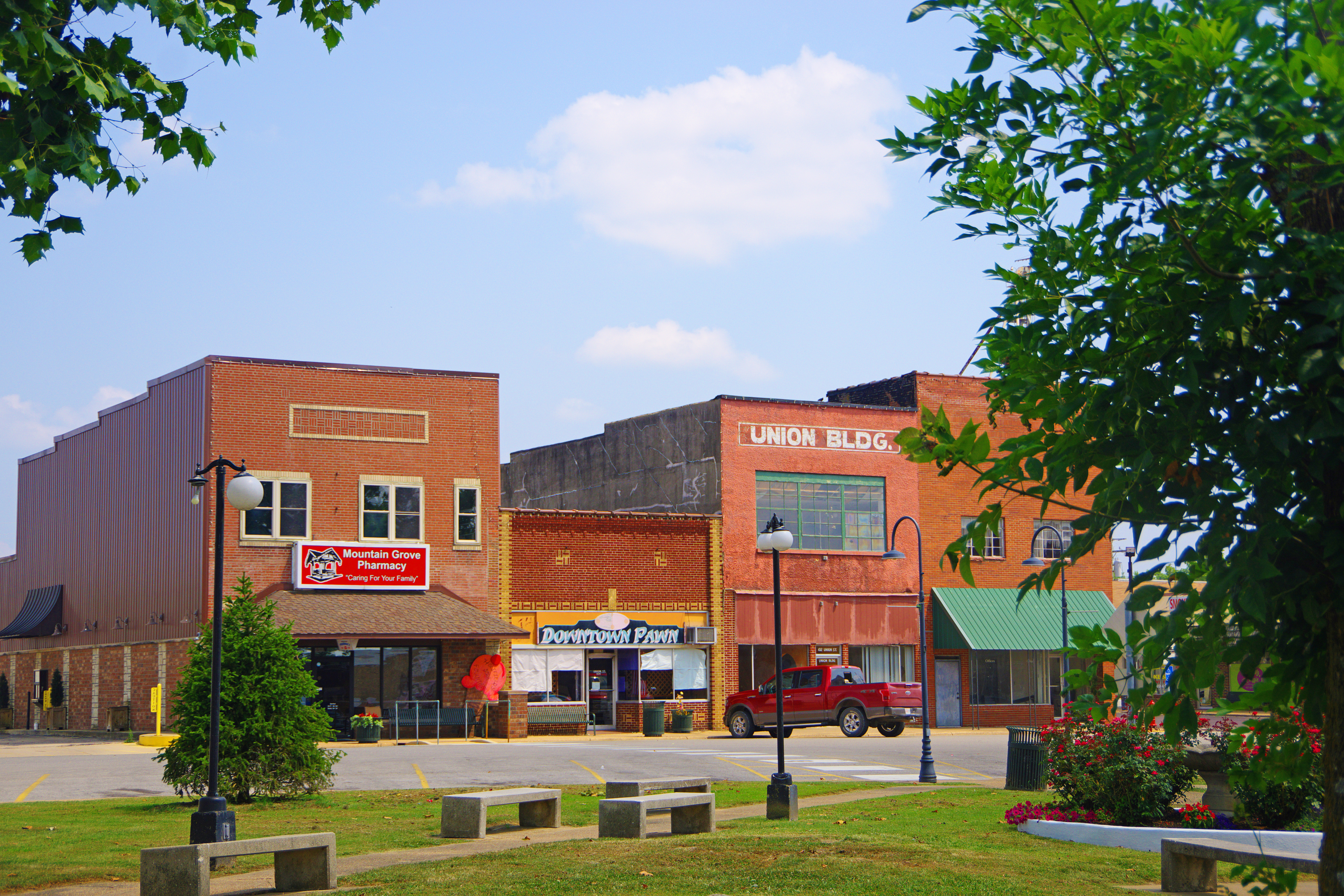
- Union Street

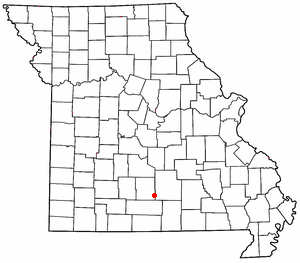
- Location of Mountain Grove, Missouri
- Coordinates: 37°07′50″N 92°15′49″W
- Country: United States
- State: Missouri
- Counties: Wright, Texas

Area
  - Total: 4.05 sq mi (10.48 km^{2})
  - Land: 4.02 sq mi (10.40 km^{2})
  - Water: 0.031 sq mi (0.08 km^{2})
- Elevation: 1,483 ft (452 m)

Population (2020)
  - Total: 4,313
  - Density: 1,074.3/sq mi (414.78/km^{2})
- Time zone: UTC-6 (Central (CST))
  - Summer (DST): UTC-5 (CDT)
- ZIP code: 65711
- Area code: 417
- FIPS code: 29-50402
- GNIS feature ID: 2395132
- Website: mountaingrovemo.gov

Mountain Grove is a city in Wright County and Texas County in Missouri, United States. It lies within the Ozarks in the south-central part of the state. The population was 4,313 at the 2020 census.

== History ==
A post office called Mountain Grove has been in operation since 1875. The community owes its present name to a stand of trees near the original elevated town site.

In 1841 a settlement was built on land east of Mountain Grove near a spring in a grove of hickory timber. A post office was established in Hickory Spring, the original name of Mountain Grove, in 1851, but was removed in 1861.

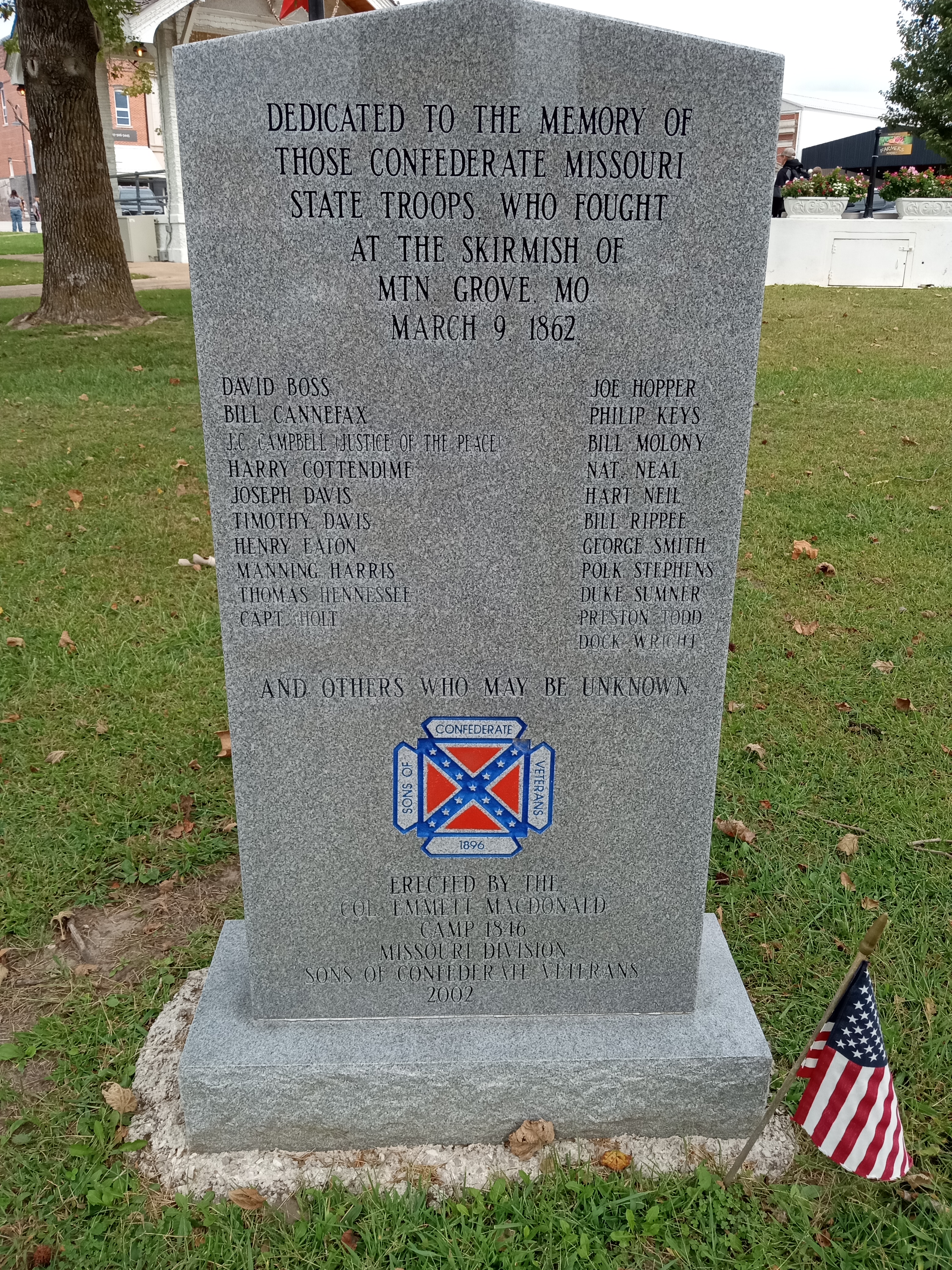
Front

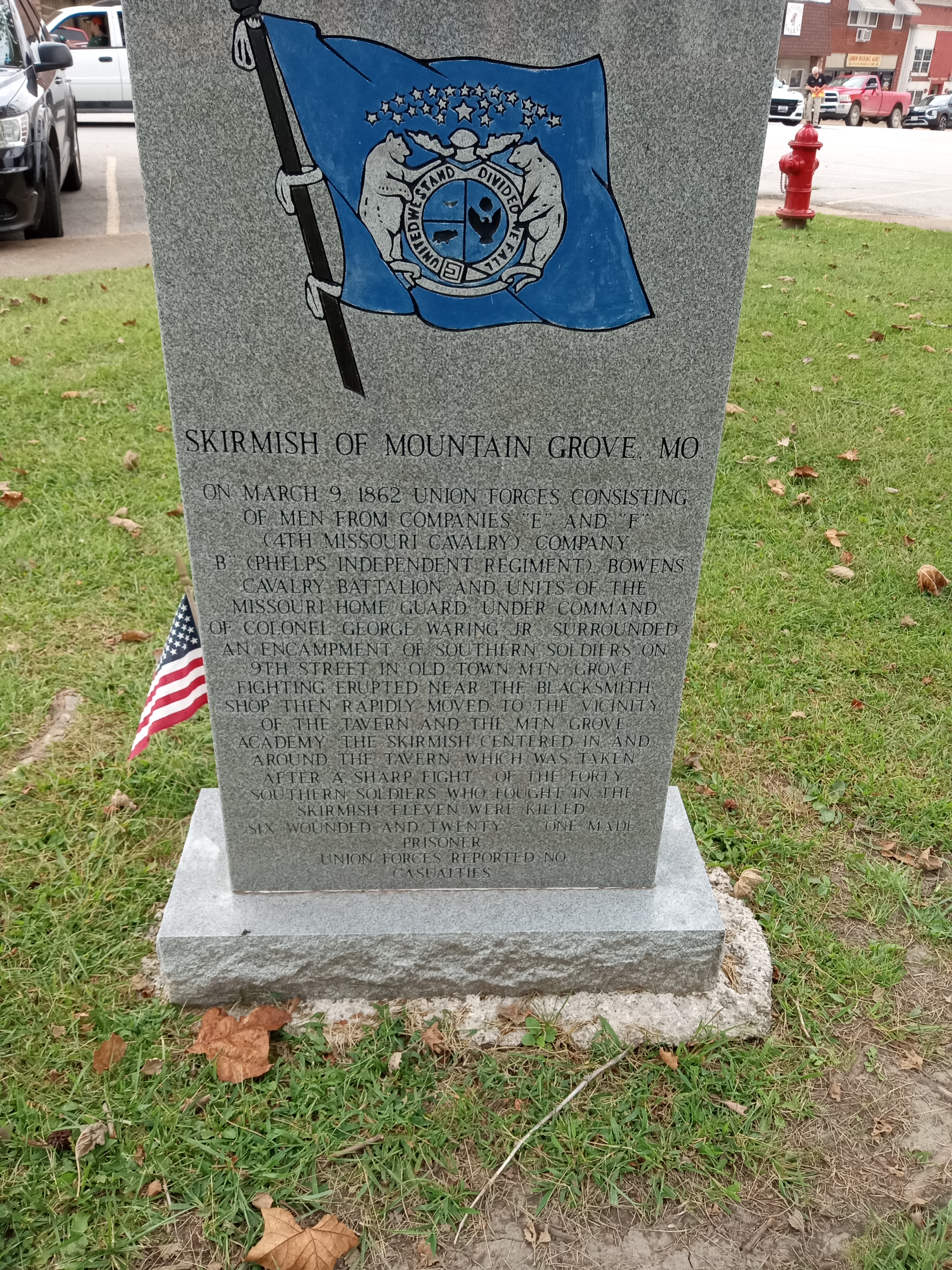
Back

The front and back of the Mountain Grove Skirmish memorial

On March 9, 1862, there was a skirmish in the town during the American Civil War. Company "B" of Phelps' Regiment of the Missouri Volunteers under command of Captain Josephus G. Rich was notified via a scout of a Confederate party located at Fox Creek "some 10 or 15 miles from the Mountain Store." Rich, one Lieutenant Flint, and 30 federal troops marched from Marshfield. The company was reinforced with around 30 troops from the Missouri Home Guard at "Lick Skillet". Later on, the company "Formed a junction on the head of Clark's Creek, at Todd's...", being bolstered by around 50 cavalry men of the 4th Regiment from Lebanon. On Sunday, March 9th, they would march from Todd's to the Mountain Grove Seminary, and encounter a Confederate force amounting somewhere between 35 and 40. In a later report from Rich to Colonel Phelps, he stated that the Confederate force suffered 13 killed, 7 wounded, and the rest taken prisoner, excluding two who may have fled. Among the prisoners were Colonel Campbell and Captain Holt, the latter of which was described in Rich's report as "badly wounded." Rich reported that the Union forces suffered no casualties, though it is likely that Rich's forces suffered 10 killed, and 2 wounded. Captain Rich would later, on March 12th, draft a report to Colonel John S. Phelps of the events mentioned.

A new post office was named for Judge Robert W. Fyan, a prominent figure in early county history. In 1859, a general store was built at the crossroads about one mile west of Hickory Spring. The Fyan post office's name was changed to Mountain Grove, with reference to its location on a ridge in a grove of trees, in 1878.

This became known as the "mountain store, mountain grove or the mountain" due to its elevation of 1,525 feet (465 m). One of the most famous incidents in Mountain Grove occurred in the middle of May 1883, when what was called a "nipping frost" caused every tree, sapling and shrub in the community of Fyan and the Fyan depot to be cut clean as from an axe. Thus, the joining of Mountain Grove and adjoining Fyan occurred. In June, the name of the depot was changed to Mountain Grove. The town reapplied for a charter in 1886, changed its boundaries and held its first election.

Buildings within or near the city listed on the National Register of Historic Places include the Administration Building, Missouri State Fruit Experiment Station, Mountain Grove Bandstand, and Mountain Grove City Hall.

== Demographics ==
Historical population
Census	Pop.	Note	%±
1880	92		—
1890	830		802.2%
1900	1,004		21.0%
1910	1,722		71.5%
1920	2,212		28.5%
1930	2,229		0.8%
1940	2,431		9.1%
1950	3,106		27.8%
1960	3,176		2.3%
1970	3,377		6.3%
1980	3,974		17.7%
1990	4,182		5.2%
2000	4,574		9.4%
2010	4,789		4.7%
2020	4,313		−9.9%
U.S. Decennial Census

Today, Mountain Grove is the most populated city in Wright County, Missouri.

=== 2020 census ===
As of the 2020 census, Mountain Grove had a population of 4,313. The median age was 41.7 years. 23.8% of residents were under the age of 18 and 22.5% of residents were 65 years of age or older. For every 100 females there were 89.4 males, and for every 100 females age 18 and over there were 85.7 males age 18 and over.

97.1% of residents lived in urban areas, while 2.9% lived in rural areas.

There were 1,905 households in Mountain Grove, of which 28.0% had children under the age of 18 living in them. Of all households, 37.3% were married-couple households, 19.7% were households with a male householder and no spouse or partner present, and 36.1% were households with a female householder and no spouse or partner present. About 37.5% of all households were made up of individuals and 20.8% had someone living alone who was 65 years of age or older.

There were 2,241 housing units, of which 15.0% were vacant. The homeowner vacancy rate was 3.5% and the rental vacancy rate was 13.2%.

Racial composition as of the 2020 census
Race	Number	Percent
White	3,939	91.3%
Black or African American	17	0.4%
American Indian and Alaska Native	32	0.7%
Asian	10	0.2%
Native Hawaiian and Other Pacific Islander	4	0.1%
Some other race	40	0.9%
Two or more races	271	6.3%
Hispanic or Latino (of any race)	118	2.7%

=== 2010 census ===
As of the census of 2010, there were 4,789 people, 2,008 households, and 1,217 families living in the city. The population density was 1,194.3 inhabitants per square mile (461.1/km^{2}). There were 2,290 housing units at an average density of 571.1 per square mile (220.5/km^{2}). The racial makeup of the city was 96.4% White, 0.3% African American, 1.0% Native American, 0.4% Asian, 0.3% from other races, and 1.6% from two or more races. Hispanic or Latino of any race were 2.2% of the population.

There were 2,008 households, of which 32.3% had children under the age of 18 living with them, 40.8% were married couples living together, 14.5% had a female householder with no husband present, 5.3% had a male householder with no wife present, and 39.4% were non-families. 34.4% of all households were made up of individuals, and 16.2% had someone living alone who was 65 years of age or older. The average household size was 2.34 and the average family size was 3.02.

The median age in the city was 37.7 years. 26.7% of residents were under the age of 18; 9.3% were between the ages of 18 and 24; 22% were from 25 to 44; 22.9% were from 45 to 64; and 19.1% were 65 years of age or older. The gender makeup of the city was 46.3% male and 53.7% female.

=== 2000 census ===
As of the census of 2000, there were 4,574 people, 1,976 households, and 1,235 families living in the city. The population density was 1,091.6 inhabitants per square mile (421.5/km^{2}). There were 2,244 housing units at an average density of 535.5 per square mile (206.8/km^{2}). The racial makeup of the city was 97.44% White, 0.17% African American, 0.61% Native American, 0.09% Asian, 0.48% from other races, and 1.20% from two or more races. Hispanic or Latino of any race were 1.09% of the population.

There were 1,976 households, out of which 29.4% had children under the age of 18 living with them, 46.4% were married couples living together, 12.4% had a female householder with no husband present, and 37.5% were non-families. 34.5% of all households were made up of individuals, and 17.9% had someone living alone who was 65 years of age or older. The average household size was 2.26 and the average family size was 2.88.

In the city the population was spread out, with 25.7% under the age of 18, 9.1% from 18 to 24, 24.1% from 25 to 44, 20.8% from 45 to 64, and 20.3% who were 65 years of age or older. The median age was 38 years. For every 100 females there were 80.4 males. For every 100 females age 18 and over, there were 76.1 males.

The median income for a household in the city was $21,131, and the median income for a family was $25,927. Males had a median income of $24,913 versus $17,003 for females. The per capita income for the city was $13,508. About 22.9% of families and 28.2% of the population were below the poverty line, including 38.1% of those under age 18 and 18.0% of those age 65 or over.

== Geography ==
Mountain Grove is located in the Ozarks, along the south edge of the Salem Plateau. The community is served by US Route 60 and Missouri Route 95. The community is mostly within Wright County, Missouri, with the eastern portion extending into Texas County, Missouri. The town sits on the drainage divide between the White River tributaries to the south and the Missouri River tributaries to the north.

According to the United States Census Bureau, the city has a total area of 4.04 square miles (10.46 km^{2}), of which 4.01 square miles (10.39 km^{2}) is land and 0.03 square miles (0.08 km^{2}) is water. The city of Mountain Grove is also directly on the border with neighboring Texas County.

=== Climate ===
Climate data for Mountain Grove, Missouri (1991–2020 normals, extremes 1901–present)
Month	Jan	Feb	Mar	Apr	May	Jun	Jul	Aug	Sep	Oct	Nov	Dec	Year
Record high °F (°C)	78 (26)	84 (29)	89 (32)	91 (33)	97 (36)	105 (41)	109 (43)	110 (43)	104 (40)	95 (35)	90 (32)	77 (25)	110 (43)
Mean maximum °F (°C)	65.0 (18.3)	69.9 (21.1)	76.9 (24.9)	81.9 (27.7)	85.8 (29.9)	90.5 (32.5)	94.9 (34.9)	95.7 (35.4)	90.9 (32.7)	82.9 (28.3)	73.1 (22.8)	65.1 (18.4)	97.0 (36.1)
Mean daily maximum °F (°C)	41.4 (5.2)	46.6 (8.1)	55.8 (13.2)	66.2 (19.0)	74.3 (23.5)	82.4 (28.0)	87.1 (30.6)	86.5 (30.3)	79.3 (26.3)	68.0 (20.0)	55.0 (12.8)	44.6 (7.0)	65.6 (18.7)
Daily mean °F (°C)	31.9 (−0.1)	36.2 (2.3)	45.0 (7.2)	55.1 (12.8)	63.8 (17.7)	72.4 (22.4)	76.8 (24.9)	75.8 (24.3)	68.2 (20.1)	57.0 (13.9)	45.2 (7.3)	35.5 (1.9)	55.2 (12.9)
Mean daily minimum °F (°C)	22.4 (−5.3)	25.9 (−3.4)	34.2 (1.2)	44.0 (6.7)	53.4 (11.9)	62.4 (16.9)	66.5 (19.2)	65.1 (18.4)	57.1 (13.9)	46.0 (7.8)	35.3 (1.8)	26.5 (−3.1)	44.9 (7.2)
Mean minimum °F (°C)	3.4 (−15.9)	8.0 (−13.3)	16.3 (−8.7)	28.4 (−2.0)	37.8 (3.2)	50.5 (10.3)	56.5 (13.6)	54.2 (12.3)	42.6 (5.9)	29.9 (−1.2)	19.1 (−7.2)	9.2 (−12.7)	−0.3 (−17.9)
Record low °F (°C)	−20 (−29)	−21 (−29)	−7 (−22)	15 (−9)	28 (−2)	40 (4)	45 (7)	39 (4)	27 (−3)	18 (−8)	2 (−17)	−19 (−28)	−21 (−29)
Average precipitation inches (mm)	2.82 (72)	2.67 (68)	4.13 (105)	5.05 (128)	5.41 (137)	3.93 (100)	4.51 (115)	3.42 (87)	4.02 (102)	3.33 (85)	3.91 (99)	2.73 (69)	45.93 (1,167)
Average snowfall inches (cm)	3.7 (9.4)	2.3 (5.8)	1.8 (4.6)	0.0 (0.0)	0.0 (0.0)	0.0 (0.0)	0.0 (0.0)	0.0 (0.0)	0.0 (0.0)	0.0 (0.0)	0.2 (0.51)	2.4 (6.1)	10.4 (26)
Average precipitation days (≥ 0.01 in)	7.0	7.1	9.2	9.4	10.5	8.4	8.1	7.0	6.3	7.1	7.5	6.6	94.2
Average snowy days (≥ 0.1 in)	2.2	1.6	0.6	0.0	0.0	0.0	0.0	0.0	0.0	0.0	0.3	1.0	5.7
Source: NOAA

== Government ==
The City of Mountain Grove is a 4th-class city and operates with a Mayor/Board of Aldermen form of Government. The City Administrator is the chief administrative officer of the city and oversees all operations. All department supervisors report directly to them. The Mayor/Board of Aldermen set policies and pass ordinances.

The current mayor of the city is Mark Bushong.

List of Alderman as of 10/20/2026
Webb Friend	Alderman, Ward 1
Dean Curtis	Alderman, Ward 1
Jamie Davis	Alderman, Ward 2
Jon Dewitt	Alderman, Ward 2
Brenda Clark	Alderman, Ward 3
Zachary Hurtt	Alderman, Ward 3
Carmen Mcarty	Alderman, Ward 4
Dale Atchison	Alderman, Ward 4

As of August 2020: each Alderman is elected for a 2-year term.

== Education ==
It is in the Mountain Grove R-III School District.

Mountain Grove public schools are a class 3A school in Missouri, including one elementary grades Pre-K through 4th, one middle school grades 5th–8th, and one high school grades 9th–12th. Mountain Grove High School also houses Ozark Mountain Technical Center, which allows students to gain technology skills necessary for vocational career paths.

Mountain Grove Christian Academy has approximately 68 students, grade Pre-K through 12th.

Missouri State University operates the 190-acre (0.77 km^{2}) Missouri State Fruit Experiment Station in Mountain Grove. The station includes the Center for Grapevine Biotechnology and the Mountain Grove Cellars. It is associated primarily with the university's Plant Science master's degree Program.

Mountain Grove has a public library, a branch of the Wright County Library.

== Notable people ==
- Russ Dugger (born 1975), stock car racing driver
- Don Faurot (1902–1995), head coach for the University of Missouri football team, as well as longtime athletic director, was born there.
- Hooks Iott (1919-1980), Major League Baseball player for the St. Louis Browns and New York Giants during the 1940s.
- Paul McDonald Robinett (1893–1975), Brigadier General, U.S. Army, was born in Mountain Grove and is buried there.

== See also ==
- List of cities in Missouri
