= Ozark, Missouri =

City in Missouri, U.S.

- City
- City of Ozark
- Location of Ozark in Christian County, Missouri.

- Location within Missouri Location within the Contiguous U.S.
- Coordinates: 37°1′38″N 93°12′34″W
- Country: United States
- State: Missouri
- County: Christian
- Incorporated: 1890
- Named after: Ozark Mountains

Government
  - Mayor: Don Currence
  - City Clerk: Chandra Hodges
  - City Administrator: Stephen Childers

Area
  - Total: 12.22 sq mi (31.64 km^{2})
  - Land: 12.15 sq mi (31.46 km^{2})
  - Water: 0.069 sq mi (0.18 km^{2})
- Elevation: 1,168 ft (356 m)

Population (2020)
  - Total: 21,284
  - Density: 1,752/sq mi (676.5/km^{2})
- Time zone: UTC-6 (Central (CST))
  - Summer (DST): UTC-5 (CDT)
- ZIP code: 65721
- Area code: 417
- FIPS code: 29-55766
- GNIS feature ID: 0723933
- Website: Official website

Ozark is a city in and the county seat of Christian County, Missouri, United States, that is on Finley Creek. Its population was 21,284 as of the 2020 census. Ozark is also the third largest city in the Springfield, Missouri Metropolitan Area, and is centered along a business loop of US 65, where it intersects with MO 14.

== History ==
Ozark was named after the Ozark Mountains, in which it is situated. The Ozark Courthouse Square Historic District was listed on the National Register of Historic Places in 2009.

The name Ozarks is believed to have begun sometime in the late 1700s or early 1800s from those living in the Arkansas area who were heading north and said they were going to the Ozarks.

The first settler to visit the area is believed to be Henry Schoolcraft, who arrived in 1818. During that time he extensively studied the geological makeup of the area and noted the high concentration of lead and zinc. Notably, in the Elk Valley area. Schoolcraft noted on the abundance of elk, bear and other wildlife in the area. This later became the area's hunting grounds, until the elk were hunted to extinction in the 1880s.

Most of the lead and zinc mines functioned until the early 1900s. The majority of the mining done in Ozark, Missouri was done in the Elk Valley area.

In the early 1920s, Howard Garrison built the Riverside Inn, a fried chicken restaurant which became very popular. It was a historical part of the community until its demolition in 2009 due to flood damages.

== Demographics ==
Historical population
Census	Pop.	Note	%±
1880	235		—
1890	490		108.5%
1900	830		69.4%
1910	813		−2.0%
1920	798		−1.8%
1930	885		10.9%
1940	961		8.6%
1950	1,087		13.1%
1960	1,536		41.3%
1970	2,384		55.2%
1980	2,980		25.0%
1990	4,243		42.4%
2000	9,665		127.8%
2010	17,820		84.4%
2020	21,284		19.4%
U.S. Decennial Census

In 2012, press reports described Ozark as the fastest-growing city in Missouri.

=== 2020 census ===
As of the 2020 census, Ozark had a population of 21,284 with 7,885 households and 5,238 families. The population density was 1,751.8 per square mile (676.5/km^{2}).

99.8% of residents lived in urban areas, while 0.2% lived in rural areas.

Of the 7,885 households, 40.1% had children under the age of 18 living in them. Of all households, 51.6% were married-couple households, 14.5% were households with a male householder and no spouse or partner present, and 26.5% were households with a female householder and no spouse or partner present. About 23.8% of all households were made up of individuals and 8.8% had someone living alone who was 65 years of age or older. The average household size was 2.6 and the average family size was 3.1.

The median age was 33.7 years; 28.2% of residents were under the age of 18, 7.8% were from 18 to 24, 26.0% were from 25 to 44, 21.9% were from 45 to 64, and 13.1% were 65 years of age or older. For every 100 females there were 92.2 males, and for every 100 females age 18 and over there were 88.0 males age 18 and over.

There were 8,267 housing units, of which 4.6% were vacant. The homeowner vacancy rate was 0.9% and the rental vacancy rate was 5.0%.

Racial composition as of the 2020 census
Race	Number	Percent
White	18,913	88.9%
Black or African American	196	0.9%
American Indian and Alaska Native	123	0.6%
Asian	124	0.6%
Native Hawaiian and Other Pacific Islander	19	0.1%
Some other race	276	1.3%
Two or more races	1,633	7.7%
Hispanic or Latino (of any race)	932	4.4%

=== 2010 census ===
At the 2010 census there were 17,820 people, 6,603 households, and 4,689 families living in the city. The population density was 1,605.4 inhabitants per square mile (619.8/km^{2}). There were 7,311 housing units at an average density of 658.6 per square mile (254.3/km^{2}). The racial makeup of the city was 95.2% White, 0.8% African American, 0.5% Native American, 0.5% Asian, 0.1% Pacific Islander, 0.8% from other races, and 2.0% from two or more races. Hispanic or Latino of any race were 3.2%.

Of the 6,603 households 43.4% had children under the age of 18 living with them, 52.6% were married couples living together, 14.0% had a female householder with no husband present, 4.4% had a male householder with no wife present, and 29.0% were non-families. 23.1% of households were one person and 7.8% were one person aged 65 or older. The average household size was 2.65 and the average family size was 3.14.

The median age was 30.9 years. 30.2% of residents were under the age of 18; 9.1% were between the ages of 18 and 24; 31.6% were from 25 to 44; 19.1% were from 45 to 64; and 10.1% were 65 or older. The gender makeup of the city was 47.3% male and 52.7% female.

=== 2000 census ===
At the 2000 census there were 9,665 people, 3,635 households, and 2,599 families living in the city. The population density was 1,280.8 inhabitants per square mile (494.5/km^{2}). There were 3,853 housing units at an average density of 510.6 per square mile (197.1/km^{2}). The racial makeup of the city was 96.36% White, 0.71% Native American, 0.33% African American, 0.30% Asian, 0.07% Pacific Islander, 0.59% from other races, and 1.63% from two or more races. Hispanic or Latino of any race were 1.70%.

Of the 3,635 households 40.9% had children under the age of 18 living with them, 55.2% were married couples living together, 12.9% had a female householder with no husband present, and 28.5% were non-families. 23.2% of households were one person and 7.7% were one person aged 65 or older. The average household size was 2.57 and the average family size was 3.04.

The age distribution was 28.9% under the age of 18, 10.7% from 18 to 24, 34.5% from 25 to 44, 16.1% from 45 to 64, and 9.8% 65 or older. The median age was 30 years. For every 100 females, there were 88.5 males. For every 100 females age 18 and over, there were 83.9 males.

The median household income was $34,210 and the median family income was $40,069. Males had a median income of $30,599 versus $21,794 for females. The per capita income for the city was $15,912. About 10.4% of families and 11.7% of the population were below the poverty line, including 17.3% of those under age 18 and 9.9% of those age 65 or over.

=== Income ===
The 2016–2020 5-year American Community Survey estimates show that the median household income was $58,995 (with a margin of error of +/- $4,275) and the median family income was $67,842 (+/- $9,725). Males had a median income of $39,931 (+/- $2,397) versus $27,374 (+/- $4,454) for females. The median income for those above 16 years old was $33,969 (+/- $3,180). Approximately, 10.4% of families and 13.8% of the population were below the poverty line, including 24.3% of those under the age of 18 and 18.3% of those ages 65 or over.

== Geography ==
Ozark is located at 37°1′38″N 93°12′34″W (37.027111, −93.209572). According to the United States Census Bureau, the city has a total area of 11.15 square miles (28.88 km^{2}), of which 11.10 square miles (28.75 km^{2}) is land and 0.05 square miles (0.13 km^{2}) is water.

=== Climate ===
Climate data for Ozark, Missouri, 1991–2020 normals, extremes 2001–present
Month	Jan	Feb	Mar	Apr	May	Jun	Jul	Aug	Sep	Oct	Nov	Dec	Year
Record high °F (°C)	73 (23)	81 (27)	85 (29)	93 (34)	94 (34)	105 (41)	106 (41)	109 (43)	102 (39)	90 (32)	82 (28)	75 (24)	109 (43)
Mean maximum °F (°C)	63.7 (17.6)	67.6 (19.8)	78.3 (25.7)	84.0 (28.9)	87.9 (31.1)	93.5 (34.2)	96.7 (35.9)	97.7 (36.5)	92.1 (33.4)	85.0 (29.4)	73.9 (23.3)	65.7 (18.7)	100.1 (37.8)
Mean daily maximum °F (°C)	44.3 (6.8)	48.7 (9.3)	58.2 (14.6)	68.2 (20.1)	76.1 (24.5)	84.3 (29.1)	89.1 (31.7)	88.9 (31.6)	82.1 (27.8)	70.1 (21.2)	57.4 (14.1)	46.9 (8.3)	67.9 (19.9)
Daily mean °F (°C)	32.8 (0.4)	36.9 (2.7)	46.1 (7.8)	55.8 (13.2)	64.9 (18.3)	73.5 (23.1)	78.0 (25.6)	76.9 (24.9)	69.6 (20.9)	57.6 (14.2)	45.1 (7.3)	36.4 (2.4)	56.1 (13.4)
Mean daily minimum °F (°C)	21.2 (−6.0)	25.1 (−3.8)	33.9 (1.1)	43.3 (6.3)	53.7 (12.1)	62.7 (17.1)	66.8 (19.3)	64.8 (18.2)	57.1 (13.9)	45.0 (7.2)	32.8 (0.4)	25.8 (−3.4)	44.4 (6.9)
Mean minimum °F (°C)	6.1 (−14.4)	11.5 (−11.4)	18.1 (−7.7)	27.8 (−2.3)	39.5 (4.2)	51.4 (10.8)	59.0 (15.0)	55.3 (12.9)	45.1 (7.3)	31.0 (−0.6)	20.1 (−6.6)	12.4 (−10.9)	2.3 (−16.5)
Record low °F (°C)	−11 (−24)	−16 (−27)	3 (−16)	17 (−8)	30 (−1)	39 (4)	51 (11)	46 (8)	35 (2)	19 (−7)	10 (−12)	−8 (−22)	−16 (−27)
Average precipitation inches (mm)	2.44 (62)	2.41 (61)	4.24 (108)	4.70 (119)	5.34 (136)	4.68 (119)	4.06 (103)	3.16 (80)	4.20 (107)	3.58 (91)	3.71 (94)	2.75 (70)	45.27 (1,150)
Average snowfall inches (cm)	2.8 (7.1)	3.2 (8.1)	0.4 (1.0)	0.0 (0.0)	0.0 (0.0)	0.0 (0.0)	0.0 (0.0)	0.0 (0.0)	0.0 (0.0)	0.0 (0.0)	0.0 (0.0)	0.4 (1.0)	6.8 (17.2)
Average precipitation days (≥ 0.01 in)	4.5	5.2	7.5	7.7	8.5	7.3	6.1	5.1	5.5	6.0	6.0	4.7	74.1
Average snowy days (≥ 0.1 in)	1.0	0.9	0.1	0.0	0.0	0.0	0.0	0.0	0.0	0.1	0.0	0.3	2.4
Source 1: NOAA
Source 2: National Weather Service (mean maxima/minima 2006–2020)

== Economy ==
Ozark was home to Simclar Interconnect Technologies, a 100,000-square-foot (9,300 m^{2}) Simclar Group factory, providing backplane fabrication for telecommunications and data communications customers. In 2007, Simclar moved 115 jobs to Ozark from Springfield, lured by a "tax incentive under which the company donated $1 million to a local not-for-profit corporation, which in turn will buy buildings, machinery and equipment and lease them back to Simclar." In 2012, Los Angeles-based private equity firm Balmoral Funds LLC acquired the Ozark plant as part of an agreement that included plants in Hialeah, Florida and Matamoros, Mexico. The company was renamed Concurrent Manufacturing Solutions LLC.

The Springfield/Ozark Mountain Ducks were an independent baseball team playing in the Central Baseball League from 1998 to 2003; Price Cutter Park, which was built in early 1999, was their home field.

In 2011, B&B Theatres built a cinema between Ozark and Nixa along Route 14. The Belltower Chapel, originally the Ozark Christian Church, was built in 1912 and is located off of the Historic Courthouse Square in Ozark; since its 21st-century renovation it serves as a venue for weddings and other events.

== Education ==
Public education in Ozark is administered by the Ozark R-VI School District. This includes, Ozark High School, Ozark Junior High School, Ozark Middle School, 4 elementary schools, and a preschool. The school's mascot is Ozzie the tiger. The Ozark Tigers have a notorious rivalry with the neighboring town's Nixa Eagles.

Ozark has a public library, the Christian County Library.

== Parks and Recreation ==
Ozark has three parks, including the Finley River Park, Garrison Springs Community Forest, and Neal Grubaugh Park. Finley River Park is the largest of the parks, within it is five baseball fields, the Ozark Boosters Club Arena, playgrounds, and a soccer field. It takes its name after the Finley River, which it is situated by. There are a variety of trails running through Ozark, one of them being the Chadwick Flyer trail, which follows the route of the historic train.

Other facilities dedicated to recreation include the Ozark Community Center, also known as The OC. The OC hosts an indoor pool, gym and training facilities, as well as a daycare program. Grubaugh Municipal Pool is located next to Neal Grubaugh Park.

== Notable people ==
- Eric Burlison, U.S. representative, former state senator and state representative
- Lucas Harrell, MLB player for the Toronto Blue Jays
- Jake Wesley Rogers, pop singer-songwriter

== See also ==
- List of cities in Missouri
