= National Club Baseball Association =

Governing body of collegiate baseball in the United States

- Abbreviation: NCBA
- Headquarters: Pittsburgh, Pennsylvania, U.S.
- Coordinates: 40.450206°N 80.015699°W
- Chief Executive Officer, President: Sandy Sanderson
- Chief Financial Officer, Treasurer: Sandy Sanderson Sr.
- Website: www.clubbaseball.org

The National Club Baseball Association (NCBA) is the national body that governs club baseball at colleges and universities in the United States. Club teams are different from varsity teams in that the school doesn't completely sponsor the teams' expenses and the teams are not eligible to play in the NCAA's College World Series.

The NCBA was founded in 2000 to provide a national structure for the existing club teams. It structures the conferences, runs the NCBA College World Series (its national championship series), gathers playing statistics, assists teams in fundraising, and arranges for discounts on baseball clothing and equipment.

The NCBA is a division of CollClubSports which operates as a for-profit LLC with a sole proprietorship in the name of Greg "Sandy" Sanderson as president. Many club-sport governing bodies operate as non-profit groups in order to return the most benefit to member teams. League dues for the NCBA are $1,700 per season per team.

The two types of institutions that field club teams are schools that can't sponsor NCAA varsity baseball (often due to Title IX restrictions) and schools that do have a varsity team, but also have enough demand to field a second team.

== Teams ==
=== Division I ===
==== Great Lakes Region ====
===== North Conference =====
School	Nickname	Location
Adrian	Bulldogs	Adrian, MI
Central Michigan	Chippewas	Mount Pleasant, MI
Notre Dame	Irish	Notre Dame, IN
Michigan	Wolverines	Ann Arbor, MI
Michigan State	Spartans	East Lansing, MI
Western Michigan	Broncos	Kalamazoo, MI

===== South Conference =====
School	Nickname	Location
Cincinnati	Bearcats	Cincinnati, OH
Dayton	Flyers	Dayton, OH
Indiana	Hoosiers	Bloomington, IN
Miami (OH)	RedHawks	Oxford, OH
Ohio	Bobcats	Athens, OH
Ohio State	Buckeyes	Columbus, OH

===== West Conference =====
School	Nickname	Location
Illinois	Fighting Illini	Champaign, IL
Illinois State	Redbirds	Normal, IL
Marquette	Golden Eagles	Milwaukee, WI
Northwestern	Wildcats	Evanston, IL
Purdue	Boilermakers	West Lafayette, IN
UW–Whitewater	Warhawks	Whitewater, WI
Wisconsin	Badgers	Madison, WI

==== Gulf Coast Region ====
===== South Conference =====
School	Nickname	Location
Baylor	Bears	Waco, TX
Texas	Longhorns	Austin, TX
Texas A&M	Aggies	College Station, TX
Texas State	Bobcats	San Marcos, TX
Texas Tech	Red Raiders	Lubbock, TX

===== North Conference =====
School	Nickname	Location
Arlington Baptist	Patriots	Arlington, TX
North Texas	Mean Green	Denton, TX
Parker	Patriots	Dallas, TX
Oklahoma	Sooners	Norman, OK
SMU	Mustangs	University Park, TX

===== East Conference =====
School	Nickname	Location
Alabama	Crimson Tide	Tuscaloosa, AL
Auburn	Tigers	Auburn, AL
LSU	Tigers	Baton Rouge, LA
Mississippi State	Bulldogs	Starkville, MS
Ole Miss	Rebels	Oxford, MS
Tulane	Green Wave	New Orleans, LA

==== Mid-America Region ====
===== North Conference =====
School	Nickname	Location
Iowa	Hawkeyes	Iowa City, IA
Iowa State	Cyclones	Ames, IA
Minnesota State	Mavericks	Mankato, MN
Northern Iowa	Panthers	Cedar Falls, IA
South Dakota	Coyotes	Vermillion, SD
South Dakota State	Jackrabbits	Brookings, SD

===== South Conference =====
School	Nickname	Location
Creighton	Bluejays	Omaha, NE
Kansas	Jayhawks	Lawrence, KS
Missouri	Tigers	Columbia, MO
Missouri S&T	Miners	Rolla, MO
Nebraska	Cornhuskers	Lincoln, NE
Saint Louis	Billikens	St. Louis, MO

===== West Conference =====
School	Mascot	Location
Air Force	Falcons	Colorado Springs, CO
Colorado	Buffaloes	Boulder, CO
Colorado Mines	Orediggers	Golden, CO
Colorado State	Rams	Fort Collins, CO
Metro State	Roadrunners	Denver, CO
Northern Colorado	Bears	Greeley, CO
Wyoming	Cowboys	Laramie, WY

==== Mid-Atlantic Region ====
===== North Conference =====
School	Nickname	Location
James Madison	Dukes	Harrisonburg, VA
Loyola Maryland	Greyhounds	Baltimore, MD
Maryland	Terrapins	College Park, MD
Towson	Tigers	Towson, MD
Virginia	Cavaliers	Charlottesville, VA
Virginia Tech	Hokies	Blacksburg, VA
William & Mary	Tribe	Williamsburg, VA

===== South Conference =====
School	Nickname	Location
Appalachian State	Mountaineers	Boone, NC
Charlotte	49ers	Charlotte, NC
East Carolina	Pirates	Greenville, NC
Elon	Phoenix	Elon, NC
High Point	Panthers	High Point, NC
NC State	Wolfpack	Raleigh, NC
North Carolina	Tar Heels	Chapel Hill, NC

==== North Atlantic Region ====
===== East Conference =====
School	Nickname	Location
Delaware	Blue Hens	Newark, DE
Drexel	Dragons	Philadelphia, PA
Penn State	Nittany Lions	State College, PA
Pittsburgh	Panthers	Pittsburgh, PA
Saint Joseph's	Hawks	Philadelphia, PA
Slippery Rock	The Rock	Slippery Rock, PA
Temple	Owls	Philadelphia, PA

===== North Conference =====
School	Nickname	Location
Binghamton	Bearcats	Binghamton, NY
Boston College	Eagles	Chestnut Hill, MA
New Hampshire	Wildcats	Durham, NH
Northeastern	Huskies	Boston, MA
UConn	Huskies	Storrs, CT
UMass	Minutemen	Amherst, MA

==== Northern Pacific Region ====
===== East Conference =====
School	Nickname	Location
Boise State	Broncos	Boise, ID
Idaho State	Bengals	Pocatello, ID
Montana State	Bobcats	Bozeman, MT
Utah	Utes	Salt Lake City, UT
Utah State	Aggies	Logan, UT
Weber State	Wildcats	Ogden, UT

===== West Conference =====
School	Nickname	Location
Gonzaga	Bulldogs	Spokane, WA
Oregon	Ducks	Eugene, OR
Oregon State	Beavers	Corvallis, OR
Washington	Huskies	Seattle, WA
Western Washington	Vikings	Bellingham, WA

==== South Atlantic Region ====
===== East Conference =====
School	Nickname	Location
Clemson	Tigers	Clemson, SC
Coastal Carolina	Chanticleers	Conway, SC
Georgia	Bulldogs	Athens, GA
Georgia College	Bobcats	Milledgeville, GA
South Carolina	Gamecocks	Columbia, SC

===== South Conference =====
School	Nickname	Location
Florida	Gators	Gainesville, FL
Florida Gulf Coast	Eagles	Fort Myers, FL
Florida State	Seminoles	Tallahassee, FL
Miami (FL)	Hurricanes	Coral Gables, FL
South Florida	Bulls	Tampa, FL
UCF	Knights	Orlando, FL

===== West Conference =====
School	Nickname	Location
Chattanooga	Mocs	Chattanooga, TN
Georgia Tech	Yellow Jackets	Atlanta, GA
Kennesaw State	Owls	Kennesaw, GA
Tennessee	Volunteers	Knoxville, TN
Vanderbilt	Commodores	Nashville, TN

==== Southern Pacific Region ====
===== North Conference =====
School	Nickname	Location
California	Golden Bears	Berkeley, CA
Nevada	Wolf Pack	Reno, NV
Sacramento State	Hornets	Sacramento, CA
San Jose State	Spartans	San Jose, CA
Sonoma State	Seawolves	Rohnert Park, CA
UC Davis	Aggies	Davis, CA

===== South Conference =====
School	Nickname	Location
Arizona	Wildcats	Tucson, AZ
Arizona State	Sun Devils	Tempe, AZ
Grand Canyon	Antelopes	Phoenix, AZ
Northern Arizona	Lumberjacks	Flagstaff, AZ
San Diego State	Aztecs	San Diego, CA
UC San Diego	Tritons	La Jolla, CA

===== West Conference =====
School	Nickname	Location
Cal Poly	Mustangs	San Luis Obispo, CA
Cal State Fullerton	Titans	Fullerton, CA
Long Beach State	49ers	Long Beach, CA
UC Santa Barbara	Gauchos	Santa Barbara, CA
UCLA	Bruins	Los Angeles, CA
Southern Cal	Trojans	Los Angeles, CA

=== Division II ===
==== Chesapeake ====
===== Central =====
School	Nickname	Location
Adelphi	Panthers	Garden City, NY
Monmouth	Hawks	West Long Branch, NJ
Rider	Broncos	Lawrenceville, NJ
Rutgers	Scarlet Knights	Piscataway, NJ
Stevens Tech	Ducks	Hoboken, NJ
Stony Brook	Seawolves	Stony Brook, NY
TCNJ	Lions	Ewing, NJ

===== North Conference =====
School	Nickname	Location
Central Connecticut State	Blue Devils	New Britain, CT
Fairfield	Stags	Fairfield, CT
Fordham	Rams	Bronx, NY
Montclair State	Red Hawks	Montclair, NJ
Quinnipiac	Bobcats	Hamden, CT
Rhode Island	Rams	Kingston, RI
Sacred Heart	Pioneers	Fairfield, CT

===== South Conference =====
School	Nickname	Location
Georgetown	Hoyas	Washington, D.C.
Maryland (DII)	Terrapins	College Park, MD
Millersville	Marauders	Millersville, PA
Stevenson	Mustangs	Stevenson, MD
Villanova	Wildcats	Villanova, PA
West Chester	Golden Rams	West Chester, PA

==== Dixie ====
===== North Conference =====
School	Nickname	Location
Emory	Eagles	Atlanta, GA
Georgia Southern	Eagles	Statesboro, GA
North Georgia	Nighthawks	Dahlonega, GA
South Carolina (DII)	Gamecocks	Columbia, SC
UNC Wilmington	Seahawks	Wilmington, NC
Western Carolina	Catamounts	Cullowhee, NC

===== South Conference =====
School	Nickname	Location
Embry-Riddle	Eagles	Daytona Beach, Florida
Florida (DII)	Gators	Gainesville, FL
Florida A&M	Rattlers	Tallahassee FL
Florida Tech	Panthers	Melbourne, FL
Tampa	Spartans	Tampa, FL
UCF	Knights	Orlando, FL

==== Great American ====
===== North Conference =====
School	Nickname	Location
Arkansas	Razorbacks	Fayetteville, AR
Kansas State	Wildcats	Manhattan, KS
Pitt State	Gorillas	Pittsburg, KS
Wash U	Bears	St. Louis, MO

===== South Conference =====
School	Nickname	Location
Houston–Downtown	Gators	Houston, TX
Lone Star College–Kingwood	Coyotes	Kingwood, TX
Rice	Owls	Houston, TX
Stephen F. Austin	Lumberjacks	Nacogdoches, TX
Texas A&M Corps of Cadets	Aggies	College Station, TX
Texas A&M–Corpus Christi	Islanders	Corpus Christi, TX
TCU	Horned Frogs	Fort Worth, TX

==== New England Region ====
===== Central Conference =====
School	Nickname	Location
Albany	Great Danes	Albany, NY
Clarkson	Golden Knights	Potsdam, NY
Marist	Red Foxes	Poughkeepsie, NY
Oneonta	Red Dragons	Oneonta, NY
Siena	Saints	Loudonville, NY
Vermont	Catamounts	Burlington, VT

===== East Conference =====
School	Nickname	Location
Bentley	Falcons	Waltham, MA
Boston	Terriers	Boston, MA
Bryant	Bulldogs	Smithfield, RI
Holy Cross	Crusaders	Worcester, MA
Maine	Black Bears	Orono, ME
Merrimack	Warriors	North Andover, MA
UMass Lowell	River Hawks	Lowell, MA

===== West Conference =====
School	Nickname	Location
Bloomsburg	Huskies	Bloomsburg, PA
Brockport	Golden Eagles	Brockport, NY
Cortland	Red Dragons	Cortland, NY
Ithaca	Bombers	Ithaca, NY
Penn State (DII)	Nittany Lions	State College, PA
Syracuse	Orange	Syracuse, NY

==== New Penn Region ====
===== Central Conference =====
School	Nickname	Location
Akron	Zips	Akron, OH
California (PA)	Vulcans	California, PA
Kent State	Golden Flashes	Kent, OH
Kentucky	Wildcats	Lexington, KY
Ohio (DII)	Bobcats	Athens, OH
West Virginia	Mountaineers	Morgantown, WV

===== East Conference =====
School	Nickname	Location
Christopher Newport	Captains	Newport News, VA
James Madison (DII)	Dukes	Harrisonburg, VA
Longwood	Lancers	Farmville, VA
Old Dominion	Monarchs	Norfolk, VA
Salisbury	Sea Gulls	Salisbury, MD

===== West Conference =====
School	Nickname	Location
Ball State	Cardinals	Muncie, IN
Butler	Bulldogs	Indianapolis, IN
Eastern Kentucky	Colonels	Richmond, KY
Indiana (DII)	Hoosiers	Bloomington, IN
Ohio State (DII)	Buckeyes	Columbus, OH
Xavier	Musketeers	Cincinnati, OH

==== Northern Plains Region ====
===== Central Conference =====
School	Nickname	Location
Illinois (DII)	Fighting Illini	Champaign, IL
Milwaukee	Panthers	Milwaukee, WI
MSOE	Raiders	Milwaukee, WI
Wayne State	Warriors	Detroit, MI
Wisconsin (DII)	Badgers	Madison, WI
UW-La Crosse	Eagles	La Crosse, WI

===== East Conference =====
School	Nickname	Location
Bowling Green	Falcons	Bowling Green, OH
Eastern Michigan	Eagles	Ypsilanti, MI
Ferris State	Bulldogs	Big Rapids, MI
Grand Valley State	Lakers	Allendale, MI
Toledo	Rockets	Toledo, OH

===== West Conference =====
School	Nickname	Location
Minnesota	Golden Gophers	Minneapolis, MN
North Dakota	Fighting Hawks	Grand Forks, ND
North Dakota State	Bison	Fargo, ND
St. Thomas	Tommies	Saint Paul, MN
UW-River Falls	Falcons	River Falls, WI

==== Pacific Region ====
===== Central Conference =====
School	Nickname	Location
Cal State Northridge	Matadors	Northridge, CA
CSU Channel Islands	Dolphins	Camarillo, CA
CMU-LA	Fighting Falcons	Los Angeles, CA
Loyola Marymount	Lions	Los Angeles, CA
Southern Utah	Thunderbirds	Cedar City, UT
UC Riverside	Highlanders	Riverside, CA

===== North Conference =====
School	Nickname	Location
Cal Poly-Humboldt	Lumberjacks	Arcata, CA
Chico State	Wildcats	Chico, CA
Lincoln	Oaklanders	Oakland, CA
Saint Mary's	Gaels	Moraga, CA
San Francisco	Dons	San Francisco, CA
Santa Clara	Broncos	Santa Clara
Stanford	Cardinal	Stanford, CA

===== South Conference =====
School	Nickname	Location
Arizona State (DII)	Sun Devils	Tempe, AZ
Cal State San Marcos	Cougars	San Marcos, CA
Grand Canyon (DII)	Antelopes	Phoenix, AZ
San Diego	Toreros	San Diego, CA
University of California, Irvine	Anteaters	Irvine, CA

==== Rocky Mountain Region ====
===== North Conference =====
School	Nickname	Location
Central Washington	Wildcats	Ellensburg, WA
Eastern Washington	Eagles	Cheney, WA
Idaho	Vandals	Moscow, ID
Montana	Grizzlies	Missoula, MT
Utah State (DII)	Aggies	Logan, UT
Washington State	Cougars	Pullman, WA

===== South Conference =====
School	Nickname	Location
Colorado College	Tigers	Colorado Springs, CO
CSU–Pueblo	ThunderWolves	Pueblo, CO
Denver	Pioneers	Denver, CO
South Dakota Mines	Hardrockers	Rapid City, SD
Western Colorado	Mountaineers	Gunnison, CO

== Schools Joining the NCBA in 2014-15 ==
- All schools will be in Division II unless noted

School	Nickname	Location
Adelphi	Panthers	Garden City, NY
Augustana (IL)	Vikings	Rock Island, IL
Bradley	Braves	Peoria, IL
Clarkson	Golden Knights	Potsdam, NY
Florida (D-II)	Gators	Gainesville, FL
Ole Miss	Rebels	Oxford, MS
Hampden-Sydney	Tigers	Hampden Sydney, VA
IU Northwest	RedHawks	Gary, IN
IUP	Crimson Hawks	Indiana, PA
Johns Hopkins	Blue Jays	Baltimore, MD
Lamar	Cardinals	Beaumont, TX
Lewis	Flyers	Romeoville, IL
Presbyterian	Blue Hose	Clinton, SC
Stetson	Hatters	DeLand, FL
New Haven	Chargers	West Haven, CT
South Florida	Bulls	Tampa, FL
West Georgia	Wolves	Carrollton, GA
UW-Superior	Yellowjackets	Superior, WI
Villanova	Wildcats	Villanova, PA
York (PA)	Spartans	York, PA

== NCBA World Series Champions ==
=== Division I champions ===
Year	Location	Champion
2001	Syracuse, NY	Texas
2002	Pueblo, CO	Texas A&M
2003	Bradenton, FL	Weber State
2004	Bradenton, FL	Colorado State
2005	Bradenton, FL	Colorado State^{(2)}
2006	Niles, OH	Colorado State^{(3)}
2007	Fort Myers, FL	North Carolina
2008	Fort Myers, FL	Colorado State^{(4)}
2009	Fort Myers, FL	Colorado State^{(5)}
2010	Fort Myers, FL	Colorado State^{(6)}
2011	Columbus, GA	East Carolina
2012	Columbus, GA	Utah State
2013	Tampa, FL	Penn State
2014	Tampa, FL	Utah State^{(2)}
2015	Paducah, KY	Oregon
2016	Paducah, KY	Nevada
2017	Holly Springs, NC	East Carolina^{(2)}
2018	Holly Springs, NC	Penn State^{(2)}
2019	Holly Springs, NC	Illinois
2020	Cancelled	
2021	Pittsburg, KS	Virginia Tech
2022	Greenwood, SC	Florida State
2023	Alton, IL	Penn State^{(3)}
2024	Alton, IL	Penn State^{(4)}

=== Division I appearances ===
Team	Appearances
Penn State University	16
Colorado State University	13
University of Oregon	10
East Carolina University	9
Texas A&M University	9
Florida State University	8
University of Illinois	8
Utah State University	5
Virginia Tech	5
Weber State University	5
Central Michigan University	4
Iowa State University	4
North Carolina State University	4
University of Iowa	4
University of Maryland	4
University of Texas	4
Clemson University	3
Grand Canyon University	3
James Madison University	3
Ohio State University	3
Sam Houston State University	3
University of Arizona	3
University of Michigan	3
University of North Carolina	3
University of Wisconsin - Madison	3
Cal Poly	2
Louisiana State University	2
Texas Tech University	2
University of California - Berkeley	2
University of Florida	2
University of Georgia	2
University of Massachusetts	2
University of Nebraska	2
University of Nevada	2
University of Pittsburgh	2
University of Virginia	2
University of Wisconsin - Eau Claire	2
Western Washington University	2
Appalachian State University	1
Arizona State University	1
Baylor University	1
Boston College	1
Michigan State University	1
Oregon State University	1
Salisbury University	1
Texas State University	1
University of California - Davis	1
University of California - San Diego	1
University of California - Santa Barbara	1
University of Central Florida	1
University of Colorado	1
University of Dayton	1
University of Delaware	1
University of North Dakota	1
University of Wisconsin-Whitewater	1

Note: through the 2024 season.

=== Division II champions ===
Year	Location	Champion
2008	Huntingburg, IN	Kentucky
2009	Butler, PA	Kentucky
2010	Johnstown, PA	Northeastern
2011	Johnstown, PA	Penn State †
2012	Columbus, GA	Hofstra
2013	Paducah, KY	Kennesaw State
2014	Paducah, KY	Texas A&M Corps of Cadets
2015	Pittsburg, KS	Eastern Kentucky
2016	Pittsburg, KS	Chattanooga
2017	Pittsburg, KS	Slippery Rock
2018	Pittsburg, KS	San Diego State
2019	Pittsburg, KS	Pittsburg State
2020	Cancelled	
2021	Cancelled	
2022	Butler, PA	Grand Canyon
2023	Alton, IL	Ohio State
2024	Alton, IL	West Chester
2025	Alton, IL	University of Wisconsin–La Crosse

† denotes school also fielded an NCBA Division I team that season

=== Division III champions ===
Year	Location	Champion
2018	DuBois, PA	Adrian
2019	Johnstown, PA	Millersville
2020	Cancelled	
2021	Cancelled	
2022	Cancelled	
2023	Butler, PA	Milwaukee School of Engineering
2024	Butler, PA	Wisconsin–River Falls
2025	Butler, PA	Craven Community College

== See also ==
- Baseball awards § U.S. college baseball
