= Uhl =

UHL or Uhl may refer to:

== Health ==
- The Uhl anomaly, a rare disease of the heart
- Unilateral hearing loss
- University Hospital Lewisham, Lewisham, London, a hospital
- University Hospital Limerick, Ireland, a hospital

== Ice hockey ==
- The United Hockey League, a defunct league in North America
- The Ukrainian Hockey League

== People ==
- Uhl (surname), with a list of people of that name

== Places and geographical features ==
- The Uhl River in the Himalayas
- Uhl's Bay, Saskatchewan, Canada, a hamlet

== Other meanings ==
- Uhl Pottery, American manufacturer of pottery
- The Norwegian Young Conservatives (Unge Høyres Landsforbund)
- Upper Holloway railway station, London, England (station code: UHL)
