= 2014 World Series (disambiguation) =

2014 World Series is the 2014 championship series of Major League Baseball.

It may also refer to:

Baseball and softball

- 2014 College World Series
- 2014 Little League Softball World Series
- 2014 Little League World Series
- 2014 NCBA Division I World Series
- 2014 NCBA Division II World Series

Other

- 2013 Fast5 Netball World Series
- 2014 PSA World Series
- 2014 World Series of Poker
- 2014 World Series of Poker Asia Pacific
- 2014 World Series by Renault season
- 2014 WSA World Series
