= 2014 NCBA Division I World Series =

American collegiate baseball competition

The 2014 National Club Baseball Association (NCBA) Division I World Series was played at University of Tampa Baseball Stadium in Tampa, FL from May 23 to May 29. The fourteenth tournament's champion was Utah State University. This was Utah State's second title in the last three seasons.

== Format ==
The format is similar to the NCAA College World Series in that eight teams participate in two four-team double elimination brackets. There are a few differences between the NCAA and the NCBA format. One of which is that the losers of Games 1–4, 7 and 8 move to the other half of the bracket. Another difference is that the NCBA plays a winner take all for its national title game while the NCAA has a best-of-3 format to determine its national champion.

== Participants ==
Seeding	School	Conference	Record (Conference)
1	East Carolina	Mid-Atlantic South	30–5 (14–1)
2	Utah State	Northern Pacific South	22–8 (14–1)
3	Florida	South Atlantic South	20–6 (13–5)
4	Delaware	North Atlantic East	21–4 (10–2)
5	Texas	Gulf Coast South	21–9 (13–5)
6	California	Southern Pacific North	22–7 (14–4)
7	Colorado State	Mid-America West	22–16 (11–7)
8	Wisconsin	Great Lakes West	19–8 (11–4)

== Results ==
=== Bracket ===
First Round
1	East Carolina	8
8	Wisconsin	16
4	Delaware	11
5	Texas	2
7	Colorado State	7
3	Florida	8
2	Utah State	6
7	Colorado State	5
3	Florida	1
6	California	10
1	East Carolina	8
5	Texas	7

Second Round
8	Wisconsin	8*
4	Delaware	7*
3	Florida	9*
2	Utah State	10*
2	Utah State	13
6	California	14
1	East Carolina	5
4	Delaware	3

Semifinals
8	Wisconsin	5	4
2	Utah State	11	6
6	California	11	-
1	East Carolina	6	-

Championship
2	Utah State	6	-	-
6	California	3	-	-

* denotes game went to extra innings

=== Game results ===
Date	Game	Time	Winner	Score	Loser	Notes
May 23	Game 1	11:00 AM	California	10–1	Florida	
May 23	Game 2	3:15 PM	Utah State	6–5	Colorado State	
May 23	Game 3	7:30 PM	Wisconsin	16–8	East Carolina	
May 24	Game 4	11:00 AM	Delaware	11–2	Texas	
May 24	Game 5	3:15 PM	Florida	8–7	Colorado State	Colorado State eliminated
May 25	Game 6	11:00 AM	East Carolina	8–7	Texas	Texas eliminated
May 25	Game 7	5:15 PM	California	14–13	Utah State	†
May 25	Game 8	11:30 PM	Wisconsin	8–7 (13 innings)	Delaware	‡
May 26	Game 9	3:15 PM	Utah State	10–9 (13 innings)	Florida	Florida eliminated
May 26	Game 10	7:30 PM	East Carolina	5–3	Delaware	Delaware eliminated
May 27	Game 11	3:15 PM	Utah State	11–5	Wisconsin	
May 28	Game 12	11:00 AM	California	11–6	East Carolina	East Carolina eliminated #
May 28	Game 13	3:15 PM	Utah State	6–4	Wisconsin	Wisconsin eliminated
May 28	Game 14	7:30 PM	Game not needed			
May 29	Game 15	11:00 AM	Utah State	6–3	California	Utah State wins the NCBA Division I World Series

† – Game was originally scheduled for 3:15 PM, but was pushed back due to a rain delay in the previous game.
‡ – Game was originally scheduled for 7:30 PM, but was pushed back due to rain delays in the two earlier games.
# – Game was originally scheduled on May 27 at 7:30 PM, but was postponed to the next morning due to rain.

=== Championship game ===
Thursday, May 29 7:30 pm Tampa, FL
Team	1	2	3	4	5	6	7	8	9	R	H	E
Utah State	2	1	0	0	1	2	0	0	0	6	11	1
California	0	0	1	1	0	1	0	0	0	3	11	3
Starting pitchers: USU: Sixto Cabrera; CAL: Luke Blanchard; WP: Sixto Cabrera LP: Luke Blanchard Sv: Dustin Christensen; Home runs: USU: None; CAL: None; Attendance: N/A; Notes: Game moved up from 7:30 PM to 11:00 AM due to weather Boxscore

== Notes ==
- Utah State became only the second to win multiple NCBA Division I World Series joining Colorado State (2004–06, 2008–10). Utah State had previously won in 2012.

== See also ==
- 2014 NCBA Division I Tournament
- 2014 NCBA Division II World Series
- 2014 NCBA Division II Tournament
