= 2014 NCBA Division II World Series =

American collegiate baseball competition

The 2014 National Club Baseball Association (NCBA) Division II World Series was held at Brooks Stadium in Paducah, Kentucky, US from May 16 to May 20. The seventh tournament's champion was the Texas A&M Corps of Cadets.

== Format ==
The format is similar to the NCAA College World Series in that eight teams participate in two four-team double elimination brackets. There are a few differences between the NCAA and the NCBA format. One of which is that the losers of Games 1-4 move to the other half of the bracket. Another difference is that the NCBA plays a winner take all for its national title game while the NCAA has a best-of-3 format to determine its national champion. Another difference which is between NCBA Division I and II is that Division II games are 7 innings while Division I games are 9 innings.

== Participants ==
Seeding	School	Conference	Record (Conference)
1	William & Mary	District III North	20-3 (14–1)
2	Colorado Mines	District VIII North	17-2 (12–0)
3	Akron	District IV North	17-1 (14–0)
4	Texas A&M Corps of Cadets	District VII West	17-3 (14–1)
5	Penn State†	District II West	19-3 (13–1)
6	Minnesota State-Moorhead	District V West	18-6 (10–2)
7	Central Missouri	District VI South	18-5 (12–3)
8	SUNY-Brockport	District I West	16-3 (11–3)

† denotes school also fields an NCBA Division I team

== Results ==
=== Bracket ===
First Round
1	William & Mary	2
8	SUNY-Brockport	1
4	Texas A&M CofC	2
5	Penn State	3
7	Central Missouri	1
6	MSU-Moorhead	2
2	Colorado Mines	4
7	Central Missouri	2
3	Akron	5
6	MSU-Moorhead	3
8	SUNY-Brockport	7
4	Texas A&M CofC	12

2nd Round
1	William & Mary	5
5	Penn State	3
6	MSU-Moorhead	4
5	Penn State	9
2	Colorado Mines	1
3	Akron	2
4	Texas A&M CofC	8
2	Colorado Mines	0

Semifinals
1	William & Mary	9	-
5	Penn State	4	-
3	Akron	1	9*
4	Texas A&M CofC	7	10*

Finals
1	William & Mary	3	-	-
4	Texas A&M CofC	6	-	-

* denotes extra inning game

=== Game Results ===
Date	Game	Time (CST)	Winner	Score	Loser	Notes
May 16	Game 1	10:00 AM	Penn State	3-2	Texas A&M Corps of Cadets	
May 16	Game 2	1:10 PM	Akron	5-3	Minnesota State-Moorhead	
May 16	Game 3	4:20 PM	Colorado Mines	4-2	Central Missouri	
May 16	Game 4	7:30 PM	William & Mary	2-1	SUNY-Brockport	
May 17	Game 5	10:00 AM	Minnesota State-Moorhead	2-1	Central Missouri	Central Missouri eliminated
May 17	Game 6	1:10 PM	Texas A&M Corps of Cadets	12-7	SUNY-Brockport	SUNY-Brockport eliminated
May 17	Game 7	4:20 PM	Akron	2-1	Colorado Mines	
May 17	Game 8	7:30 PM	William & Mary	5-3	Penn State	
May 18	Game 9	4:20 PM	Texas A&M Corps of Cadets	8-0	Colorado Mines	Colorado Mines eliminated
May 18	Game 10	7:30 PM	Penn State	9-4	Minnesota State-Moorhead	Minnesota State-Moorhead eliminated
May 19	Game 11	10:00 AM	Texas A&M Corps of Cadets	7-1	Akron	
May 19	Game 12	1:10 PM	William & Mary	9-4	Penn State	Penn State eliminated
May 19	Game 13	4:20 PM	Texas A&M Corps of Cadets	10-9 (12 innings)	Akron	Akron eliminated
May 19	Game 14	7:30 PM	Game not needed			
May 20	Game 15	7:30 PM	Texas A&M Corps of Cadets	6-3	William & Mary	Texas A&M Corps of Cadets wins the NCBA Division II World Series

=== Championship Game ===
Tuesday, May 20 7:30 pm Paducah, KY
Team	1	2	3	4	5	6	7	R	H	E
Texas A&M CofC	1	1	1	0	1	0	2	6	9	2
William & Mary	1	0	2	0	0	0	0	3	4	1
Starting pitchers: TAMUCC: Will Pace; WM: John Bowman; WP: Will Pace LP: John Bowman Sv: None; Home runs: TAMUCC: None; WM: None; Attendance: N/A; Boxscore

== See also ==
- 2014 NCBA Division I Tournament
- 2014 NCBA Division I World Series
- 2014 NCBA Division II Tournament

== Notes ==
- The 12 inning game between Akron and the Texas A&M Corps of Cadets was the longest Division II World Series game in NCBA history in terms of innings played. This had shattered the previous mark of 9 innings, which was set on three occasions (2008 Kentucky/Wyoming, 2012 Kennesaw State/Maryland and 2012 Penn State/Wyoming).
- Texas A&M Corps of Cadets became the first team since Kentucky in 2009 to win the NCBA Division II World Series after losing their first game of the tournament.
