= Huntingburg Town Hall and Fire Engine House =

- U.S. National Register of Historic Places
- U.S. Historic district – Contributing property
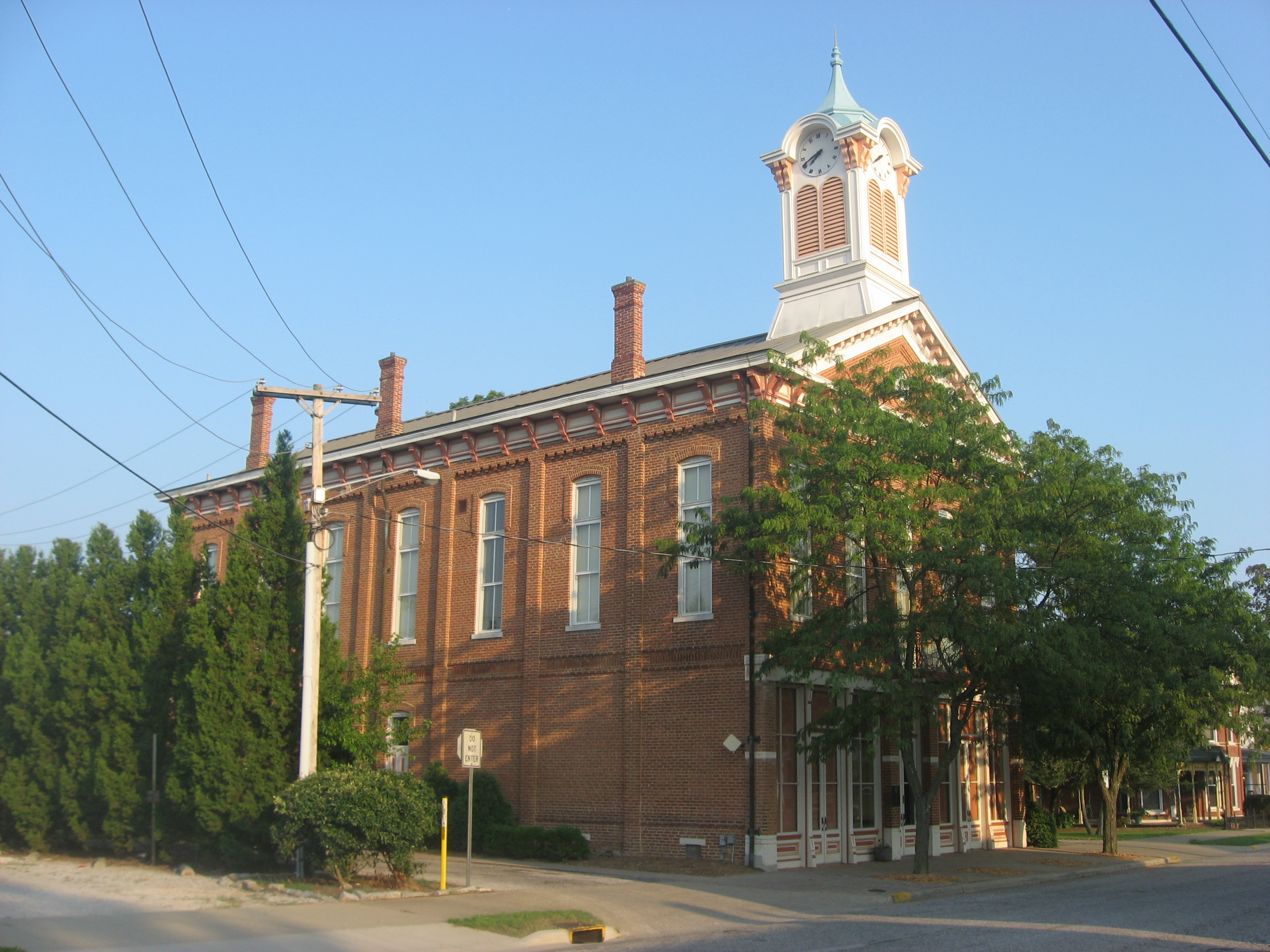
- Huntingburg Town Hall and Fire Engine House, July 2011

- Location within Indiana Location within the United States
- Location: 311 Geiger St., Huntingburg, Indiana
- Coordinates: 38°17′42″N 86°57′25″W
- Area: 0.3 acres (0.12 ha)
- Built: 1885-1886
- Built by: Dickenson, Herman
- Architect: Mursinna, Henry
- Architectural style: Victorian
- NRHP reference No.: 75000016
- Added to NRHP: May 12, 1975

Huntingburg Town Hall and Fire Engine House, also known as Old City Hall, is a historic town hall and fire station located at Huntingburg, Indiana. It was built in 1885–1886, and is a two-story, Victorian style brick building with a gable roof. It features a reconstructed cupola. It was built to serve multiple purposes and housed an opera house on the second floor. The building housed city offices until it was closed in 1971.

It was added to the National Register of Historic Places in 1975. It is located in the Huntingburg Commercial Historic District.
