= Huntingburg Commercial Historic District =

Historic district in Indiana, United States

- U.S. National Register of Historic Places
- U.S. Historic district
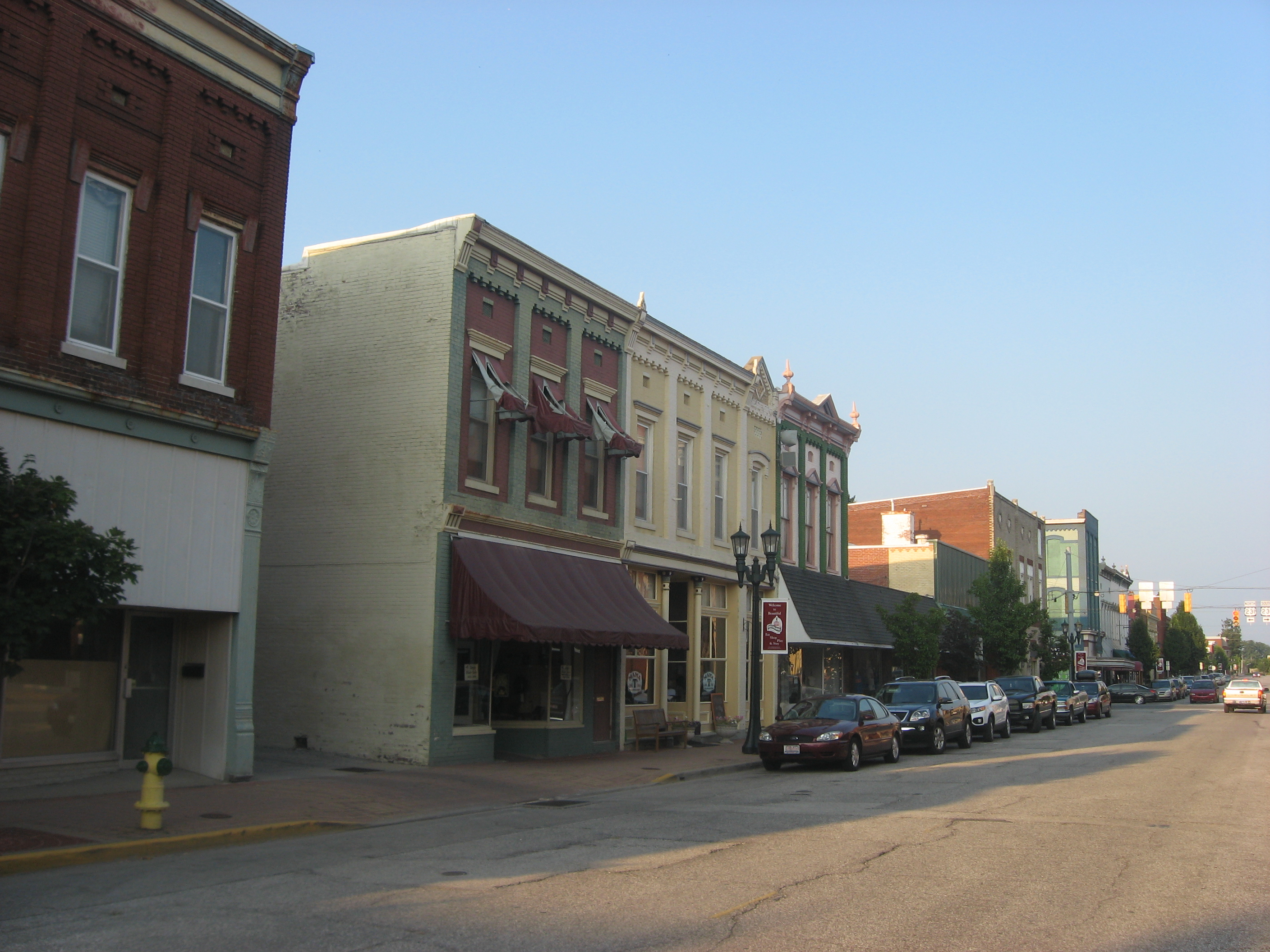
- Huntingburg Commercial Historic District, July 2011

- Location within Indiana Location within the United States
- Location: Roughly bounded by Geiger, 4th, Jackson and Market Sts., Huntingburg, Indiana
- Coordinates: 38°17′44″N 86°57′19″W
- Area: 5.5 acres (2.2 ha)
- Architect: Mursinna, Henry; Boyle, Harry
- Architectural style: Italianate, Romanesque, et al.
- NRHP reference No.: 06000517
- Added to NRHP: June 21, 2006

Huntingburg Commercial Historic District is a national historic district located at Huntingburg, Indiana. It encompasses 46 contributing buildings in the central business district of Huntingburg. They were built between about 1871 and 1956 and include notable examples of Italianate and Romanesque Revival style architecture and characterized by cast iron and stamped metal storefronts. Located in the district is the separately listed Huntingburg Town Hall and Fire Engine House. Other notable buildings include the Huntingburg Bank (1897), Huntingburg Post Office (1897), A.H. Miller Drug Store (1898), Bolte Building / First National Bank Building (c. 1919), Landgrebe-Kilian Building (1887), The Gem Theater (1920), The Huntingburg Bank (1926), and the American Legion (1950).

It was added to the National Register of Historic Places in 2006.
