= 2013 NCBA Division I World Series =

American collegiate baseball competition

The 2013 National Club Baseball Association (NCBA) Division I World Series was played at University of Tampa Baseball Stadium in Tampa, FL from May 24 to May 30. The thirteenth tournament's champion was Penn State University. The Most Valuable Player was Kyle Gilbert of Penn State University.

== Format ==
The format is similar to the NCAA College World Series in that eight teams participate in two four-team double elimination brackets with the exception of a one-game national championship rather than a best-of-3 format to determine the national champion like the NCAA. Beginning with the 2013 edition of the NCBA Division I World Series, the losers of Games 7 and 8 were sent to the other half of the bracket in addition to the losers of Games 1–4.

== Participants ==
- All records are pre-World Series games

Seeding	School	Conference	Record (Conference)
1	Texas A&M	Gulf Coast South	21-1 (11–1)
2	Illinois	Great Lakes South	18-3 (9–2)
3	Iowa	Mid-America North	19-4 (8–1)
4	Penn State	North Atlantic West	20-6 (10–4)
5	California	Southern Pacific North	18-9 (10–2)
6	James Madison	Mid-Atlantic North	17-4 (9–3)
7	Western Washington	Northern Pacific West	14-7 (10–1)
8	Florida	South Atlantic South	14-9 (8–4)

== Results ==
=== Bracket ===
First Round
1	Texas A&M	12
8	Florida	5
4	Penn State	10
5	California	0
2	Illinois	7
3	Iowa	9
2	Illinois	6
7	Western Washington	14
3	Iowa	10
6	James Madison	12
8	Florida	5
5	California	3

Second Round
1	Texas A&M	2
4	Penn State	4
3	Iowa	3
7	Western Washington	6
7	Western Washington	5
6	James Madison	6
8	Florida	11
1	Texas A&M	6

Semifinals
4	Penn State	5	-
7	Western Washington	4	-
6	James Madison	6	-
8	Florida	3	-

Championship Game
4	Penn State	12	-	-
6	James Madison	5	-	-

=== Game Results ===
Date	Game	Time	Winner	Score	Loser	Notes
May 24	Game 1	11:00 AM	James Madison	12-10 (10 innings)	Iowa	
May 24	Game 2	3:15 PM	Western Washington	14-6	Illinois	
May 24	Game 3	7:30 PM	Texas A&M	12-5	Florida	
May 25	Game 4	11:00 AM	Penn State	10-0	California	
May 25	Game 5	3:15 PM	Iowa	9-7	Illinois	Illinois eliminated
May 26	Game 6	11:00 AM	Florida	5-3	California	California eliminated
May 26	Game 7	3:15 PM	James Madison	6-5 (10 innings)	Western Washington	
May 26	Game 8	7:30 PM	Penn State	4-2	Texas A&M	
May 27	Game 9	3:15 PM	Western Washington	6-3	Iowa	Iowa eliminated
May 27	Game 10	7:30 PM	Florida	11-6	Texas A&M	Texas A&M eliminated
May 28	Game 11	3:15 PM	Penn State	5-4	Western Washington	Western Washington eliminated
May 28	Game 12	7:30 PM	James Madison	6-3	Florida	Florida eliminated
May 29	Game 13	3:15 PM or 7:30 PM	Game not needed			
May 29	Game 14	7:30 PM	Game not needed			
May 30	Game 15	7:30 PM	Penn State	12-5	James Madison	Penn State wins NCBA Division I World Series

=== Championship Game ===
Thursday, May 30 7:30 pm Tampa, FL
Team	1	2	3	4	5	6	7	8	9	R	H	E
James Madison	0	0	0	0	0	0	0	1	4	5	12	3
Penn State	0	0	4	0	4	2	2	0	X	12	16	2
Starting pitchers: JMU: Jonathan Bitto; PSU: Kyle Gilbert; WP: Kyle Gilbert LP: Jonathan Bitto Sv: None; Home runs: JMU: Tyler Caton; PSU: None; Attendance: N/A; Boxscore

== See also ==
- 2013 NCBA Division I Tournament
- 2013 NCBA Division II World Series
- 2013 NCBA Division II Tournament
