= 2008 NCBA Division I World Series =

American collegiate baseball competition

The 2008 National Club Baseball Association (NCBA) Division I World Series was played at City of Palms Park in Fort Myers, FL from May 23 to May 29. The eighth tournament's champion was Colorado State University. This was Colorado State's fourth title in the last five years. The Most Valuable Player was Brian Dilley of Colorado State University.

Colorado State became the first team in NCBA World Series history to lose their first game and win the World Series.

== Format ==
The format is similar to the NCAA College World Series in that eight teams participate in two four-team double elimination brackets with the only difference being that in the NCBA, there is only one game that decides the national championship rather than a best-of-3 like the NCAA.

== Participants ==
Seeding	School	Region
1	Penn State	North Atlantic
2	Oregon	Northern Pacific
3	Colorado State	Mid-America
4	Arizona	Southern Pacific
5	North Carolina State	South Atlantic
6	Central Michigan	Great Lakes
7	Baylor	Gulf Coast
8	Virginia Tech	Mid-Atlantic

== Results ==
=== Bracket ===
First Round
1	Penn State	5
8	Virginia Tech	4
4	Arizona	11
5	North Carolina State	14
8	Virginia Tech	21
4	Arizona	3
2	Oregon	18
7	Baylor	10
3	Colorado State	5
6	Central Michigan	6
7	Baylor	1
3	Colorado State	12

Second Round
1	Penn State	13
5	North Carolina State	6
8	Virginia Tech	11
5	North Carolina State	12
2	Oregon	9
6	Central Michigan	2
3	Colorado State	5
6	Central Michigan	3

Semifinals
1	Penn State	5	5
5	North Carolina State	7	2
2	Oregon	2	3
3	Colorado State	7	14

Championship Game
1	Penn State	1	-	-
3	Colorado State	5	-	-

=== Game Results ===
Date	Game	Time	Winner	Score	Loser	Notes
May 23	Game 1	11:00 AM	Central Michigan	6-5	Colorado State	
May 23	Game 2	3:00 PM	Oregon	18-10	Baylor	
May 23	Game 3	7:30 PM	Penn State	5-4	Virginia Tech	
May 24	Game 4	11:00 AM	North Carolina State	14-11	Arizona	
May 24	Game 5	3:00 PM	Colorado State	12-1	Baylor	Baylor eliminated
May 25	Game 6	11:00 AM	Virginia Tech	21-3	Arizona	Arizona eliminated
May 25	Game 7	3:00 PM	Oregon	9-2	Central Michigan	
May 25	Game 8	7:30 PM	Penn State	13-6	North Carolina State	
May 26	Game 9	3:00 PM	North Carolina State	12-11	Virginia Tech	Virginia Tech eliminated
May 26	Game 10	7:30 PM	Colorado State	5-3	Central Michigan	Central Michigan eliminated
May 27	Game 11	3:00 PM	North Carolina State	7-5	Penn State	
May 27	Game 12	7:30 PM	Colorado State	7-2	Oregon	
May 28	Game 13	3:00 PM	Penn State	5-2	North Carolina State	North Carolina State eliminated
May 28	Game 14	7:30 PM	Colorado State	14-3	Oregon	Oregon eliminated
May 29	Game 15	7:30 PM	Colorado State	5-1	Penn State	Colorado State wins NCBA World Series

== See also ==
- 2008 NCBA Division II World Series
