= 2008 NCBA Division II World Series =

American collegiate baseball competition

The 2008 National Club Baseball Association (NCBA) Division II World Series was played at League Stadium in Huntingburg, IN from May 16 to May 20. This was the first time that the NCBA had offered a Division II World Series for club baseball teams.

The University of Kentucky won the inaugural NCBA Division II World Series over the University of Illinois in walk-off fashion.

== Format ==
The format is similar to the NCAA College World Series in that eight teams participate in two four-team double elimination brackets with the only difference being that in the NCBA, there is only one game that decides the national championship rather than a best-of-3 like the NCAA. Another difference which is between NCBA Division I and II is that Division II games are 7 innings while Division I games are 9 innings.

== Participants ==
- LSC-Kingwood
- North Greenville
- Wyoming
- NYU
- Illinois†
- VCU
- Kentucky
- Southern Illinois

† - denotes team also fields an NCBA Division I team

== Results ==
=== Game Results ===
Date	Game	Time	Winner	Score	Loser	Notes
May 16	Game 1	11:30 AM	NYU	7-0	Illinois	NYU Pitcher Anthony Perez threw a No Hitter
May 16	Game 2	2:00 PM	Wyoming	5-3	VCU	
May 16	Game 3	4:30 PM	Kentucky	12-5	North Greenville	
May 16	Game 4	7:00 PM	LSC-Kingwood	15-2	Southern Illinois	
May 17	Game 5	10:00 AM	VCU	13-5	North Greenville	North Greenville eliminated
May 17	Game 6	1:00 PM	Illinois	7-0	Southern Illinois	Southern Illinois eliminated
May 17	Game 7	4:00 PM	Kentucky	7-5 (9 innings)	Wyoming	
May 17	Game 8	7:00 PM	LSC-Kingwood	11-7	NYU	
May 18	Game 9	4:00 PM	VCU	6-3	Wyoming	Wyoming eliminated
May 18	Game 10	7:00 PM	Illinois	14-11	NYU	NYU eliminated
May 19	Game 11	10:00 AM	Kentucky	6-5	VCU	VCU eliminated
May 19	Game 12	1:00 PM	Illinois	4-3 (8 innings)	LSC-Kingwood	
May 19	Game 13	4:00 PM	Game not needed			
May 19	Game 14	4:00 PM	Illinois	13-11	LSC-Kingwood	LSC-Kingwood eliminated
May 20	Game 15	7:00 PM	Kentucky	7-6	Illinois	Kentucky wins the NCBA Division II World Series

=== Championship Game ===
Tuesday, May 20 7:00 PM at Huntingburg, IN
Team	1	2	3	4	5	6	7	R	H	E
Illinois	0	0	0	3	2	1	0	6	11	3
Kentucky	0	0	2	1	1	2	1	7	7	1
Boxscore

== Notes ==
- Kentucky's victory over Illinois in the title game set two NCBA Division II World Series records which still stand. Most runs scored by one team in a non-extra inning title game (7, Kentucky) and most combined runs in a non-extra inning title game (13).

== See also ==
- 2008 NCBA Division I World Series
