= 2013 NCBA Division II World Series =

American collegiate baseball competition

The 2013 National Club Baseball Association (NCBA) Division II World Series was played at Brooks Stadium in Paducah, KY from May 17 to May 21. The sixth tournament's champion was Kennesaw State University. The Most Valuable Player was Aaron Moore of Kennesaw State University.

== Format ==
The format is similar to the NCAA College World Series in that eight teams participate in two four-team double elimination brackets. There are a few differences between the NCAA and the NCBA format. One of which is that the losers of Games 1–4 move to the other half of the bracket. Another difference is that the NCBA plays a winner take all for its national title game while the NCAA has a best-of-3 format to determine its national champion. Another difference which is between NCBA Division I and II is that Division II games are 7 innings while Division I games are 9 innings.

== Participants ==
‡ - denotes school also has a NCBA Division I team

Seeding	School	Conference	Record (Conference)
1	Kennesaw State	District IV West	20–2 (15–0)
2	Penn State‡	District I North	19–1 (14–1)
3	Northeastern	District II North	24–6 (11–1)
4	SIU Edwardsville	District VI North	16–3 (11–1)
5	Maryland‡	District III North	18–6 (10–2)
6	Stephen F. Austin	District VII West	17–7 (10–2)
7	Wisconsin‡	District V South	12–5 (7–1)
8	Wyoming	District VIII North	16–8 (9–3)

== Results ==
=== Bracket ===
First Round
1	Kennesaw State	7
8	Wyoming	3
4	SIU-Edwardsville	1
5	Maryland	2
7	Wisconsin	1
3	Northeastern	3
2	Penn State	2
7	Wisconsin	1
3	Northeastern	4
6	Stephen F. Austin	7
8	Wyoming	12
4	SIU-Edwardsville	4

Second Round
1	Kennesaw State	6
5	Maryland	3
3	Northeastern	1
5	Maryland	6
2	Penn State	2
6	Stephen F. Austin	3
8	Wyoming	1
2	Penn State	8

Semifinals
1	Kennesaw State	15	-
5	Maryland	9	-
6	Stephen F. Austin	13	-
2	Penn State	10	-

Championship Game
1	Kennesaw State	5
6	Stephen F. Austin	2

=== Game results ===
Date	Game	Time	Winner	Score	Loser	Notes
May 17	Game 1	10:00 AM	Maryland	2–1	SIU Edwardsville	
May 17	Game 2	1:10 PM	Stephen F. Austin	7–4	Northeastern	
May 17	Game 3	4:20 PM	Penn State	2–1	Wisconsin	
May 17	Game 4	7:30 PM	Kennesaw State	7–3	Wyoming	
May 18	Game 5	10:00 AM	Northeastern	3–1	Wisconsin	Wisconsin eliminated
May 18	Game 6	1:10 PM	Wyoming	12–4	SIU Edwardsville	SIU Edwardsville eliminated
May 18	Game 7	4:20 PM	Stephen F. Austin	3–2	Penn State	
May 18	Game 8	7:30 PM	Kennesaw State	6–3	Maryland	
May 19	Game 9	4:20 PM	Penn State	8–1	Wyoming	Wyoming eliminated
May 19	Game 10	7:30 PM	Maryland	6–1	Northeastern	Northeastern eliminated
May 20	Game 11	10:00 AM	Stephen F. Austin	13–10	Penn State	Penn State eliminated
May 20	Game 12	1:10 PM	Kennesaw State	15–9	Maryland	Maryland eliminated
May 20	Game 13	4:20 PM	Game not needed			
May 20	Game 14	4:20 PM or 7:30 PM	Game not needed			
May 21	Game 15	12:00 PM	Kennesaw State	5–2	Stephen F. Austin	Kennesaw State wins NCBA DII World Series

=== Championship game ===
Tuesday, May 21 12:00 pm Paducah, KY
Team	1	2	3	4	5	6	7	R	H	E
Stephen F. Austin	2	0	0	0	0	0	0	2	8	1
Kennesaw State	0	4	0	0	1	0	X	5	7	1
Starting pitchers: SFA: Michael Coronado; KSU: Danny Gillespie; WP: Danny Gillespie LP: Michael Coronado Sv: Jeremy Sanders; Home runs: SFA: Trent Loria, Steven Lopez; KSU: Caleb Moore; Attendance: N/A; Notes: Championship Game moved from 7:00 PM to Noon due to impending inclement weather. Boxscore

== See also ==
- 2013 NCBA Division II Tournament
- 2013 NCBA Division I World Series
- 2013 NCBA Division I Tournament

== Notes ==
- Kennesaw State, Northeastern, SIU Edwardsville and Wyoming all moved up to the NCBA Division I following the World Series for the 2013–14 season.
