= Huntingburg Airport =

Airport in Indiana, US

- IATA: HNB; ICAO: KHNB; FAA LID: HNB

Summary
- Airport type: Public
- Owner: Dubois County Airport Authority
- Serves: Huntingburg, Indiana
- Elevation AMSL: 529 ft (161 m)
- Coordinates: 38°14′56″N 086°57′13″W

Map
- Location of airport in Indiana HNB (the United States)

Runways
Direction	Length		Surface
Direction	ft	m	Surface
9/27	5,501	1,677	Asphalt

Statistics (2010)
- Aircraft operations: 11,170
- Based aircraft: 27
- Source: Federal Aviation Administration

Huntingburg Airport (IATA: HNB, ICAO: KHNB, FAA LID: HNB) is a public use airport located three nautical miles (6 km) south of the central business district of Huntingburg, a city in Dubois County, Indiana, United States. It is owned by the Dubois County Airport Authority. This airport is included in the National Plan of Integrated Airport Systems for 2011–2015, which categorized it as a general aviation facility.

== Facilities and aircraft ==
Huntingburg Airport covers an area of 480 acres (194 ha) at an elevation of 529 feet (161 m) above mean sea level. It has one runway designated 9/27 with an asphalt surface measuring 5,000 by 75 feet (1,524 x 23 m).

For the 12-month period ending December 31, 2010, the airport had 11,170 aircraft operations, an average of 30 per day: 95% general aviation, 4% air taxi, and 1% military. At that time there were 27 aircraft based at this airport: 48% single-engine, 30% multi-engine, and 22% jet.

== See also ==
- List of airports in Indiana
