= Uhl (surname) =

Uhl is a German surname. Notable people with the surname include:

== Arts and entertainment ==
- Alfred Uhl, Austrian composer
- Eléona Uhl, Swiss writer
- Frida Uhl, Austrian writer and translator
- Fritz Uhl, Austrian tenor
- Nadja Uhl, German actress

== Politics ==
- Eduard Uhl, mayor of Vienna
- Edwin F. Uhl, American lawyer and politician
- Hans-Peter Uhl (1944–2019), German CSU politician
- Markus Uhl (born 1979), German CDU politician
- Michael Uhl, American activist

== Sport ==
- Bill Uhl, American basketball player
- Billy Uhl, American motorcyclist
- Bob Uhl, American baseball player
- Lisa Uhl, American runner
- Miranda Uhl, American swimmer

== Other ==
- Bernd Uhl (1946-2023), German Roman Catholic prelate
- Edward Uhl, American soldier and inventor
- Natalie Whitford Uhl (1919-2017), American botanist
