= 2007 NCBA World Series =

American collegiate baseball competition

The 2007 National Club Baseball Association (NCBA) World Series was played at City of Palms Park in Fort Myers, FL from May 24 to May 30. The eighth tournament's champion was the University of North Carolina.

This was the last NCBA World Series in which there was only one division of competition. Beginning the next season, the NCBA split into Division I and Division II for their teams.

== Format ==
The format is similar to the NCAA College World Series in that eight teams participate in two four-team double elimination brackets with the only difference being that in the NCBA, there is only one game that decides the national championship rather than a best-of-3 like the NCAA.

== Participants ==
School	Region
Colorado State	Mid-America
Illinois	Great Lakes
Maryland	Mid-Atlantic
North Carolina	South Atlantic
Oregon	Northern Pacific
Penn State	North Atlantic
Sam Houston State	Gulf Coast
UC Davis	Southern Pacific

== Results ==
=== Game Results ===
Date	Game	Time	Winner	Score	Loser	Notes
May 24	Game 1	11:00 AM	North Carolina	10-6	UC Davis	
May 24	Game 2	3:00 PM	Maryland	9-2	Sam Houston State	
May 24	Game 3	7:30 PM	Oregon	5-2	Penn State	
May 25	Game 4	11:00 AM	Colorado State	8-0	Illinois	
May 25	Game 5	1:00 PM	Sam Houston State	9-5	UC Davis	UC Davis eliminated
May 26	Game 6	11:00 AM	Penn State	5-2	Illinois	Illinois eliminated
May 26	Game 7	3:00 PM	North Carolina	14-0	Maryland	
May 26	Game 8	7:30 PM	Oregon	4-0	Colorado State	
May 27	Game 9	3:00 PM	Penn State	2-1	Colorado State	Colorado State eliminated
May 27	Game 10	7:30 PM	Maryland	10-5	Sam Houston State	Sam Houston State eliminated
May 28	Game 11	3:00 PM	Penn State	6-0	Oregon	
May 28	Game 12	7:30 PM	Maryland	6-0	North Carolina	
May 29	Game 13	3:00 PM	Oregon	2-1	Penn State	Penn State eliminated
May 29	Game 14	7:30 PM	North Carolina	6-2	Maryland	Maryland eliminated
May 30	Game 15	7:30 PM	North Carolina	8-6	Oregon	North Carolina wins the NCBA World Series

=== Championship Game ===
Wednesday, May 30 7:30 pm Fort Myers, FL
Team	1	2	3	4	5	6	7	8	9	R	H	E
Oregon	0	0	0	0	0	3	3	0	0	6	11	4
North Carolina	0	0	2	0	4	0	1	1	X	8	11	3
Boxscore
