= Uhl Pottery =

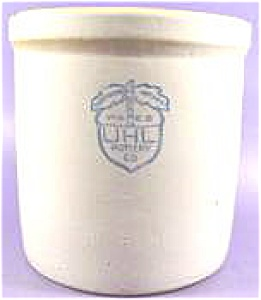
A sample 1 gallon crock made by Uhl Pottery Company.

Uhl Pottery refers to a collection of items produced by the Uhl Pottery Company. Originally based in Evansville, Indiana in the late 19th century, the company moved to Huntingburg, Indiana where it operated until closure in the 1940s. Items range from everyday household crocks, jugs, and vessels, to exotic collector miniatures

== History ==
The year was 1848 in Lissberg, Germany/ Hesse. Brothers August and Louis Uhl worked at their father's business, primarily making ceramic roofing tile. The two brothers, quite young, decided it best they seek out their fortunes in America. Elder brother August decided it best he scout out an area first, and so he set out. Initially, August landed in New York and set out for Pittsburgh. There, he set forth on the Ohio River on boat, looking for a prime area. Along the way, August took inventory of the clays of the areas passed, and decided Evansville to have the optimal plasticity for making pottery.

Louis eventually came over, and the two founded A. & L. Uhl in Evansville at Ninth and Sycamore streets. The two divided tasks, and the business prospered. Initial products included jars, vases, jugs, and stone pumps. After a period of time, it was decided the Evansville area clay was inferior to the superior quality the brothers expected. A good fire clay was located in Huntingburg, and after testing the brothers confirmed the quality. Soon, wagons of Huntingburg clay were sent to Rockport, then down the Ohio River to Evansville for storage.

Wares were made by hand, and the quality of the products grew the business. In 1879, Louis purchased August's interest in the company. Louis' son George joined his father as a partner in the new Louis Uhl & Son Company. George's brother Charles soon purchased his brother's interests, and the Uhl Pottery Company was formed. In 1908, Louis died and the company moved operations to Huntingburg for proximity to the clay deposits. It was on this site that the Uhl Pottery Company produced its famous "Acorn Wares" until the 1940s.

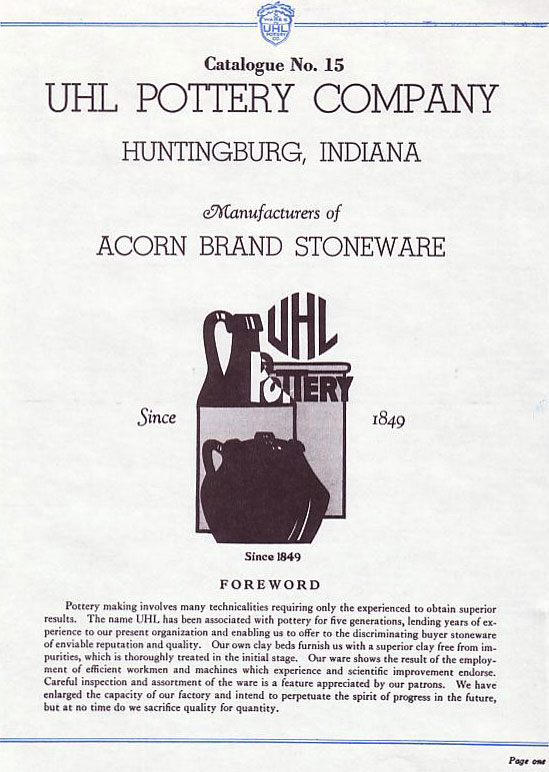
Cover of the 15th edition of the Uhl Pottery Company catalog.

Salesmen often carried sales catalogs on trips. From Indiana to as far away as Florida, Uhl Pottery found its way into the homes and businesses of America. The company persisted through World War I, the Great Depression, and the majority of World War II. In the end, a labor dispute ended the factory, with Louis Uhl making the difficult decision. The factory changed hands to Vogue Pottery, then Louisville Pottery, with neither organization surviving very long.

== Jane Uhl Pottery ==
In addition to the more traditional and utilitarian Uhl wares made in Huntingburg, a relatively unknown variant of Uhl Pottery was made by Jane Uhl. Sister of Louis C. Uhl, Jane Uhl spent her time learning the family craft at a young age in Southern Indiana. Inspired by the possibilities of the medium, Jane spent time in England with an artist crafting her own unique style to a future pottery line. Upon her return, Jane was commissioned in 1928 to fill two residences for Birmingham, Alabama businessman Theodore Swann.

What resulted was a pottery style that is perfect for the collecting community. Jane's understanding of pottery basics through the Uhl Pottery Company, combined with her trip to England, resulted in some of the most unusual and collectible pieces of antique pottery in America. The stock market crash of 1929 hit Mr. Swann very hard, and the family held onto the bulk of the commissioned pieces until an estate sale in 1986. Today, Jane Uhl pottery occupies a special place alongside the factory-turned pieces made in Southern Indiana.

== Uhl Collectors Society ==
The family retained the rights to the Uhl trademarks. In doing so, since 1985 the Uhl Collectors Society has existed to celebrate the history and quality of the Uhl Pottery Company. Today, there is an annual meeting of the not for profit society in Southern Indiana. This meeting often features items from members' personal collections, along with an annual commemorative, and an auction for rare and hard to find items. Uhl Collectors Society Website: Uhl Collectors Society

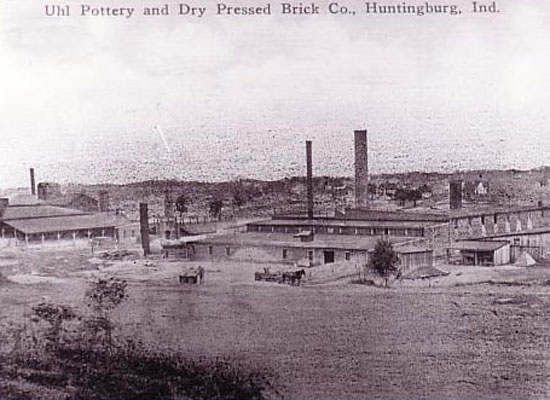
The former Uhl Pottery Company brickyard and factory in Huntingburg, seen here in the early 1900s.

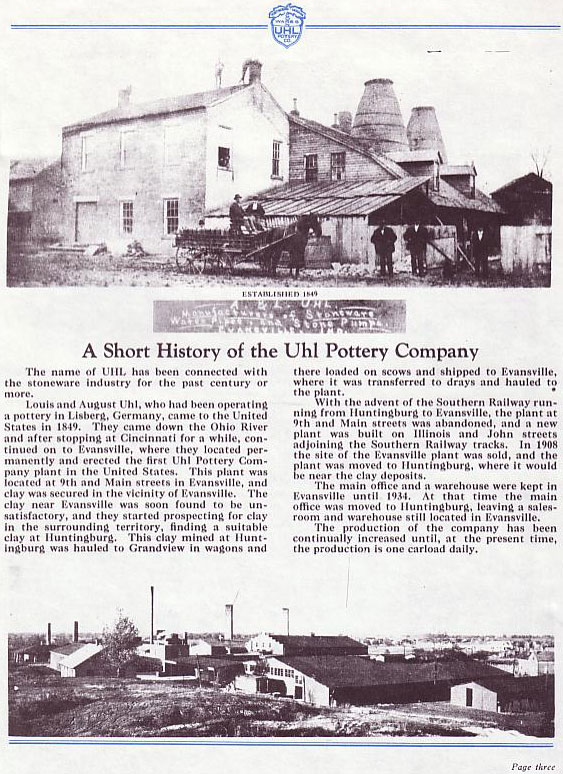
Page 3 of the Uhl Pottery Company catalog, with a short history of the company.
