= 2002 NCBA World Series =

American collegiate baseball competition

The 2002 National Club Baseball Association (NCBA) World Series was played at Hobbs Field in Pueblo, CO from May 23 to May 27. The second tournament's champion was Texas A&M University.

== Format ==
The format is similar to the NCAA College World Series in that eight teams participate in two four-team double elimination brackets with the only difference being that in the NCBA, there is only one game that decides the national championship rather than a best-of-3 like the NCAA. A major difference between the NCAA and NCBA World Series is that NCBA World Series games were only 7 innings (until 2006) while NCAA games are 9 innings.

== Participants ==
- Clemson
- Colorado State
- North Carolina
- Ohio State
- Penn State
- Texas A&M
- Virginia
- Weber State

== Results ==
=== Game Results ===
Date	Game	Winner	Score	Loser	Notes
May 23	Game 1	Texas A&M	15-5	North Carolina	
May 23	Game 2	Virginia	9-8	Colorado State	
May 23	Game 3	Penn State	11-10	Weber State	
May 23	Game 4	Ohio State	5-4	Clemson	
May 24	Game 5	Weber State	9-2	North Carolina	North Carolina eliminated
May 24	Game 6	Colorado State	4-1	Clemson	Clemson eliminated
May 24	Game 7	Texas A&M	7-3	Penn State	
May 25	Game 8	Ohio State	8-7	Virginia	
May 25	Game 9	Weber State	7-4	Penn State	Penn State eliminated
May 25	Game 10	Colorado State	19-4	Virginia	Virginia eliminated
May 26	Game 11	Texas A&M	11-6	Weber State	Weber State eliminated
May 26	Game 12	Colorado State	21-6	Ohio State	
May 26	Game 13	Game not needed			
May 26	Game 14	Colorado State	8-6	Ohio State	Ohio State eliminated
May 27	Game 15	Texas A&M	16-3	Colorado State	Texas A&M wins the NCBA World Series

=== Championship Game ===
Monday, May 27 at Pueblo, CO
Team	1	2	3	4	5	6	7	R	H	E
Colorado State	0	3	0	0	0	0	0	3	7	1
Texas A&M	4	2	5	0	5	0	X	16	19	3
Home runs: CSU: None; TAMU: Fuller; Boxscore
