= 2011 NCBA Division I World Series =

American collegiate baseball competition

The 2011 National Club Baseball Association (NCBA) Division I World Series was played at Golden Park in Columbus, GA from May 27 to June 2. The eleventh tournament's champion was East Carolina University. The Most Valuable Player of the tournament was Maurice Mackey of East Carolina University.

== Format ==
The format for the NCBA Division I World Series was modified in 2011. From 2001 to 2010, there were two separate four team double elimination brackets similar to the NCAA College World Series with the exception a one-game championship between the two bracket winners.

Starting in 2011, the losers of Games 1-4 were sent to the other half of the bracket. With this format, there could be a possibility of two teams meeting in the first round playing in the national championship game (this happened in this World Series as East Carolina and Florida State met in the first round and played each other in the title game).

== Participants ==
Seeding	School	Conference
1	UC Santa Barbara	Southern Pacific West
2	UMass	North Atlantic North
3	Texas Tech	Gulf Coast North
4	East Carolina	Mid-Atlantic South
5	Florida State	South Atlantic South
6	Iowa	Mid-America North
7	Western Washington	Northern Pacific West
8	Michigan	Great Lakes North

== Results ==
=== Bracket ===
First Round
1	UC Santa Barbara	5
8	Michigan	2
4	East Carolina	4
5	Florida State	2
2	UMass	5
6	Iowa	9
2	UMass	5
7	Western Washington	17
3	Texas Tech	4*
6	Iowa	3*
8	Michigan	2
5	Florida State	3

Second Round
1	UC Santa Barbara	2
4	East Carolina	14
6	Iowa	9
1	UC Santa Barbara	10
7	Western Washington	7
3	Texas Tech	8
5	Florida State	2
7	Western Washington	1

Semifinals
4	East Carolina	8	12
1	UC Santa Barbara	11	7
3	Texas Tech	5	1
5	Florida State	6	2

Championship Game
4	East Carolina	10	-	-
5	Florida State	3	-	-

* denotes game went to extra innings

=== Game Results ===
Date	Game	Time	Winner	Score	Loser	Notes
May 27	Game 1	11:00 AM	Texas Tech	4-3 (10 innings)	Iowa	
May 27	Game 2	3:00 PM	Western Washington	17-5	UMass	
May 27	Game 3	7:00 PM	UC Santa Barabara	5-2	Michigan	
May 28	Game 4	11:00 AM	East Carolina	4-2	Florida State	
May 28	Game 5	3:00 PM	Iowa	9-5	UMass	UMass eliminated
May 29	Game 6	11:00 AM	Florida State	3-2	Michigan	Michigan eliminated
May 29	Game 7	3:00 PM	Texas Tech	8-7	Western Washington	
May 29	Game 8	7:00 PM	East Carolina	14-2	UC Santa Barbara	
May 30	Game 9	3:00 PM	UC Santa Barabara	10-9	Iowa	Iowa eliminated
May 30	Game 10	7:00 PM	Florida State	2-1	Western Washington	Western Washington eliminated
May 31	Game 11	3:00 PM	UC Santa Barbara	11-8	East Carolina	
May 31	Game 12	7:00 PM	Florida State	6-5	Texas Tech	
June 1	Game 13	3:00 PM	East Carolina	12-7	UC Santa Barbara	UC Santa Barbara eliminated
June 1	Game 14	7:00 PM	Florida State	2-1	Texas Tech	Texas Tech eliminated
June 2	Game 15	7:00 PM	East Carolina	10-3	Florida State	East Carolina wins the NCBA Division I World Series

=== Championship Game ===
Thursday, June 2 7:00 pm Columbus, GA
Team	1	2	3	4	5	6	7	8	9	R	H	E
Florida State	2	0	0	0	1	0	0	0	0	3	4	3
East Carolina	1	0	0	0	8	0	1	0	X	10	10	0
Starting pitchers: FSU: Kevin McCourt; ECU: Zachary Woodley; WP: Zachary Woodley LP: Kevin McCourt Sv: None; Home runs: FSU: None; ECU: None; Attendance: N/A; Boxscore

== See also ==
- 2011 NCBA Division I Tournament
- 2011 NCBA Division II World Series
- 2011 NCBA Division II Tournament
