= 2013 NCBA Division II Tournament =

American collegiate baseball competition

The 2013 National Club Baseball Association (NCBA) Division II Tournament was a post-season tournament for the best teams in the NCBA during the 2013 season. 28 NCBA Division II college baseball teams met after playing their way through the regular season to play in the NCBA Tournament. The tournament culminated with eight teams competing for the 2013 NCBA Division II World Series at Brooks Stadium in Paducah, KY.

== Districts ==
The opening rounds of the tournament were played across eight pre-determined sites across the country, each consisting of a four-team field except for Districts VII and VIII, which consisted of a two-team best-of-three format. All other districts were double elimination. The winner of each district advanced to the NCBA Division II World Series.

=== District I ===
at Erie, PA

First Round
1	Penn State	9
3	SUNY-Buffalo	4
2	SUNY-Oneonta	8
4	West Virginia	11
Lower round 1
3	SUNY-Buffalo	6
2	SUNY-Oneonta	5

Semi-Finals
1	Penn State	19
4	West Virginia	2
Lower final
3	SUNY-Buffalo	0
4	West Virginia	8

Finals
1	Penn State
4	West Virginia

- Since Penn State and West Virginia were from the same conference therefore the two teams could not meet in the first round.

=== District II ===
at Warwick, RI

First Round
1	Hofstra	1
4	Sacred Heart	0
2	Northeastern	2
3	St. Joseph's (PA)	7
Lower round 1
4	Sacred Heart	5
2	Northeastern	6

Semi-Finals
1	Hofstra	12
3	St. Joseph's (PA)	2
Lower final
2	Northeastern	6
3	St. Joseph's (PA)	5

Finals
1	Hofstra
2	Northeastern

=== District III ===
at Martinsville, VA

First Round
1	Maryland	4
4	Longwood	3
2	William & Mary	8
3	Radford	9
Lower round 1
4	Longwood	4
2	William & Mary	3

Semi-Finals
1	Maryland	6
3	Radford	4
Lower final
4	Longwood	14
3	Radford	8

Finals
1	Maryland
4	Longwood

=== District IV ===
at Clemson, SC

First Round
1	Kennesaw State	13
3	Craven CC	3
2	USC-Union	6
4	Alabama	8
Lower round 1
3	Craven CC	7
2	USC-Union	12

Semi-Finals
1	Kennesaw State	8
4	Alabama	7
Lower final
2	USC-Union	6
4	Alabama	4

Finals
1	Kennesaw State
2	USC-Union

- Kennesaw State and Alabama were from the same conference and therefore could not play in the first round.

=== District V ===
at Sheboygan, WI

First Round
1	Grand Valley State	2
4	Lakehead	7
2	Wisconsin	6
3	MSU-Moorhead	2
Lower round 1
1	Grand Valley State	4
3	MSU-Moorhead	9

Semi-Finals
4	Lakehead	0
2	Wisconsin	2
Lower final
3	MSU-Moorhead	9
4	Lakehead	4

Finals
2	Wisconsin
3	MSU-Moorhead

=== District VI ===
at Huntingburg, IN

First Round
1	SE Missouri State	3
4	Eastern Kentucky	2
2	SIU-Edwardsville	2
3	Ohio State	1
Lower round 1
4	Eastern Kentucky	4
3	Ohio State	5

Semi-Finals
1	SE Missouri State	0
2	SIU-Edwardsville	3
Lower final
3	Ohio State	7
1	SE Missouri State	5

Finals
2	SIU-Edwardsville
3	Ohio State

=== District VII ===
at Houston, TX

Final (Best-of-3)
1	Rice	3	3	2
2	Stephen F. Austin	5	1	5

=== District VIII ===
at Fort Collins, CO

Final (Best-of-3)
1	Western State (CO)	1	0	-
2	Wyoming	2	4	-
