= 2005 NCBA World Series =

American collegiate baseball competition

The 2005 National Club Baseball Association (NCBA) World Series was played at McKechnie Field in Bradenton, Florida, from May 25 to May 30. The fifth tournament's champion was Colorado State University. This was Colorado State's second consecutive title as they became the first team in NCBA history to repeat as national champions. The Most Valuable Player was Brooks Purdy of Colorado State University.

== Format ==
The format is similar to the NCAA College World Series in that eight teams participate in two four-team double elimination brackets with the only difference being that in the NCBA, there is only one game that decides the national championship rather than a best-of-3 like the NCAA. This was the final season in which only 7 innings were played in NCBA World Series play. Starting in 2006, NCBA World Series games became 9 inning contests.

== Participants ==
Seeding	School	Region
1	Colorado State	Rocky Mountain
2	Maryland	Mid-Atlantic
3	Sam Houston State	Gulf Coast
4	North Carolina State	Southeast Atlantic
5	Oregon	Northern Pacific
6	Illinois	Great Lakes
7	UMass	Northeast Atlantic
8	Wisconsin-Eau Claire	Mid-America

== Results ==
=== Bracket ===
First Round
1	Colorado State	4
8	UW-Eau Claire	0
4	North Carolina State	1
5	Oregon	3
8	UW-Eau Claire	7
4	North Carolina State	4
2	Maryland	4
7	UMass	2
3	Sam Houston State	4
6	Illinois	6
7	UMass	5
3	Sam Houston State	7

Second Round
1	Colorado State	6
5	Oregon	1
8	UW-Eau Claire	8
5	Oregon	1
2	Maryland	2
6	Illinois	7
3	Sam Houston State	5
2	Maryland	6

Semifinals
1	Colorado State	3	10
8	UW-Eau Claire	6	2
6	Illinois	2	-
2	Maryland	1	-

Championship Game
1	Colorado State	9	-	-
6	Illinois	5	-	-

=== Game Results ===
Date	Game	Time	Winner	Score	Loser	Notes
May 25	Game 1	9:30 AM	Colorado State	4-0	UW-Eau Claire	
May 25	Game 2	12:30 PM	Maryland	4-2	UMass	
May 25	Game 3	3:30 PM	Illinois	6-4	Sam Houston State	
May 26	Game 4	12:30 PM	Oregon	3-1	North Carolina State	
May 26	Game 5	3:30 PM	Sam Houston State	7-5	UMass	UMass eliminated
May 27	Game 6	9:30 AM	UW-Eau Claire	7-4	North Carolina State	North Carolina State eliminated
May 27	Game 7	12:30 PM	Colorado State	6-1	Oregon	
May 27	Game 8	3:30 PM	Illinois	7-2	Maryland	
May 28	Game 9	12:30 PM	UW-Eau Claire	8-1	Oregon	Oregon eliminated
May 28	Game 10	3:30 PM	Maryland	6-5	Sam Houston State	Sam Houston State eliminated
May 29	Game 11	9:30 AM	UW-Eau Claire	6-3	Colorado State	
May 29	Game 12	12:30 PM	Illinois	2-1	Maryland	Maryland eliminated
May 29	Game 13	3:30 PM	Colorado State	10-2	UW-Eau Claire	UW-Eau Claire eliminated
May 29	Game 14	7:30 PM	Game not needed			
May 30	Game 15	3:30 PM	Colorado State	9-5	Illinois	Colorado State wins NCBA World Series
