= 2010 NCBA Division II World Series =

American collegiate baseball competition

The 2010 National Club Baseball Association (NCBA) Division II World Series was held at Point Stadium in Johnstown, PA from May 21 to May 25. The third tournament's champion was Northeastern University.

== Format ==
The format is similar to the NCAA College World Series in that eight teams participate in two four-team double elimination brackets with a couple differences. One being that in the NCBA, there is only one game that decides the national championship rather than a best-of-3 like the NCAA. Another difference which is between NCBA Division I and II is that Division II games are 7 innings while Division I games are 9 innings.

== Participants ==
- Macon State
- Northeastern
- Penn State†
- Pulaski Tech
- Rice
- Southern Illinois
- Western State (Colorado)
- William & Mary

†-denotes school also fields an NCBA Division I team

== Results ==
=== Game Results ===
Date	Game	Time	Winner	Score	Loser	Notes
May 21	Game 1	10:00 AM	Northeastern	10-2	Western State	
May 21	Game 2	1:00 PM	Southern Illinois	5-3	Macon State	
May 21	Game 3	4:00 PM	Penn State	10-3	Pulaski Tech	
May 21	Game 4	7:00 PM	William & Mary	8-2	Rice	
May 22	Game 5	10:00 AM	Macon State	12-0	Pulaski Tech	Pulaski Tech eliminated
May 22	Game 6	1:00 PM	Rice	5-2	Western State	Western State eliminated
May 23	Game 7	10:00 AM	Penn State	10-0	Southern Illinois	
May 23	Game 8	1:00 PM	Northeastern	10-5	William & Mary	
May 23	Game 9	4:00 PM	Southern Illinois	7-2	Macon State	Macon State eliminated
May 23	Game 10	7:00 PM	Rice	6-4	William & Mary	William & Mary eliminated
May 24	Game 11	10:00 AM	Southern Illinois	5-2	Penn State	
May 24	Game 12	1:00 PM	Northeastern	6-3	Rice	Rice eliminated
May 24	Game 13	4:00 PM	Penn State	12-1	Southern Illinois	Southern Illinois eliminated
May 24	Game 14	7:00 PM	Game not needed			
May 25	Game 15	7:00 PM	Northeastern	5-4 (8 innings)	Penn State	Northeastern wins the NCBA Division II World Series

=== Championship Game ===
Tuesday, May 25 7:00 pm Johnstown, PA
Team	1	2	3	4	5	6	7	8	R	H	E
Penn State	0	0	0	0	0	2	0	2	4	7	0
Northeastern	1	0	0	0	0	0	1	3	5	8	1
Starting pitchers: PSU: Carl Motts; NU: Matt Conroy; WP: Nick Young LP: Gerard Vath Sv: None; Home runs: PSU: None; NU: None; Attendance: N/A; Boxscore

== See also ==
- 2010 NCBA Division I World Series

== Notes ==
- Northeastern became the second and last school to win the NCBA Division II World Series in their first World Series appearance. The only other school to accomplish this feat was Kentucky when they won the inaugural event in 2008.
