= 2011 NCBA Division II World Series =

American collegiate baseball competition

The 2011 National Club Baseball Association (NCBA) Division II World Series was played at Point Stadium in Johnstown, PA from May 20 to May 24. The fourth tournament's champion was Penn State University.

== Format ==
The format for the NCBA Division II World Series was modified in 2011. From 2008 to 2010, there were two separate four team double elimination brackets similar to the NCAA College World Series with the exception a one-game championship between the two bracket winners. Another difference which is between NCBA Division I and II is that Division II games are 7 innings while Division I games are 9 innings.

Starting in 2011, the losers of Games 1-4 were sent to the other half of the bracket. With this format, there could be a possibility of two teams meeting in the first round playing in the national championship game.

== Participants ==
- Central Missouri
- Furman
- Hofstra
- Longwood
- Penn State†
- Texas State
- Wisconsin†
- Wyoming

† denotes school also fielded an NCBA Division I team that season

== Results ==
=== Game Results ===
Date	Game	Time (EST)	Winner	Score	Loser	Notes
May 20	Game 1	10:00 AM	Longwood	11-7	Hofstra	
May 20	Game 2	1:00 PM	Wisconsin	14-5	Furman	
May 20	Game 3	4:00 PM	Penn State	8-3	Texas State	
May 20	Game 4	7:00 PM	Wyoming	6-2	Central Missouri	
May 21	Game 5	10:00 AM	Texas State	8-3	Furman	Furman eliminated
May 21	Game 6	1:00 PM	Hofstra	10-4	Central Missouri	Central Missouri eliminated
May 21	Game 7	4:00 PM	Penn State	11-4	Wisconsin	
May 21	Game 8	7:00 PM	Wyoming	6-2	Longwood	
May 22	Game 9	4:00 PM	Wisconsin	7-5	Hofstra	Hofstra eliminated
May 22	Game 10	7:00 PM	Longwood	7-5	Texas State	Texas State eliminated
May 23	Game 11	9:00 AM	Penn State	6-3	Wisconsin	Wisconsin eliminated
May 23	Game 12	12:00 PM	Wyoming	6-1	Longwood	Longwood eliminated
May 23	Game 13	3:00 PM	Game not needed			
May 23	Game 14	6:00 PM	Game not needed			
May 24	Game 15	7:00 PM	Penn State	13-11 (8 innings)	Wyoming	Penn State wins the NCBA Division II World Series

=== Championship Game ===
Tuesday, May 24 7:00 pm Johnstown, PA
Team	1	2	3	4	5	6	7	8	R	H	E
Penn State	0	2	3	5	1	0	0	2	13	15	1
Wyoming	3	6	2	0	0	0	0	0	11	13	1
Starting pitchers: PSU: Peter Racioppo; WYO: Erik Hansen; WP: David Pyles LP: Dustin Stallings Sv: None; Home runs: PSU: Patrick Lucas; WYO: None; Attendance: N/A; Boxscore

== See also ==
- 2011 NCBA Division I World Series

== Notes ==
- Penn State's extra inning victory over Wyoming set two NCBA Division World Series championship game records. The first of which was the most combined runs scored by both teams in a title game (24) and most runs by a single team in a title game (13, Penn State).
