= 2009 NCBA Division II World Series =

American collegiate baseball competition

The 2009 National Club Baseball Association (NCBA) Division II World Series was played at Pullman Park in Butler, PA from May 15 to May 19. The second tournament's champion was the University of Kentucky, who won their second consecutive Division II title.

As of 2014, Kentucky is the only school to repeat as NCBA Division II National Champions. The only other school to repeat as NCBA World Series Champions in any division is Colorado State, who won three straight titles from 2004 to 2006 and again from 2008 to 2010 in Division I.

== Format ==
The format is similar to the NCAA College World Series in that eight teams participate in two four-team double elimination brackets with a couple of differences. One is that in the NCBA, there is only one game that decides the national championship rather than a best-of-3 like the NCAA. Another difference which is between NCBA Division I and II is that Division II games are 7 innings while Division I games are 9 innings.

== Participants ==
- Coastal Carolina
- Hofstra
- Kentucky
- LSC-Kingwood
- Penn State†
- Southern Illinois
- VCU
- Wyoming

†-denotes school also fields an NCBA Division I team

== Results ==
=== Game Results ===
Date	Game	Time	Winner	Score	Loser	Notes
May 15	Game 1	10:00 AM	Coastal Carolina	3-1	Penn State	
May 15	Game 2	1:00 PM	LSC-Kingwood	3-2 (8 innings)	Kentucky	
May 15	Game 3	4:00 PM	Wyoming	8-3	Southern Illinois	
May 15	Game 4	7:00 PM	VCU	20-2	Hofstra	
May 16	Game 5	10:00 AM	Kentucky	11-3	Southern Illinois	Southern Illinois eliminated
May 16	Game 6	1:00 PM	Hofstra	9-6	Penn State	Penn State eliminated
May 16	Game 7	4:00 PM	Wyoming	4-3	LSC-Kingwood	
May 17	Game 8	1:00 PM	Coastal Carolina	17-12	VCU	
May 17	Game 9	4:00 PM	Kentucky	9-8	LSC-Kingwood	LSC-Kingwood eliminated
May 17	Game 10	7:00 PM	VCU	6-5	Hofstra	Hofstra eliminated
May 18	Game 11	10:00 AM	Kentucky	8-1	Wyoming	
May 18	Game 12	1:00 PM	Coastal Carolina	8-5	VCU	VCU eliminated
May 18	Game 13	4:00 PM	Kentucky	12-6	Wyoming	Wyoming eliminated
May 18	Game 14	7:00 PM	Game not needed			
May 19	Game 15	7:00 PM	Kentucky	3-2	Coastal Carolina	Kentucky wins the NCBA Division II World Series

=== Championship Game ===
Tuesday, May 19 7:00 PM at Bulter, PA
Team	1	2	3	4	5	6	7	R	H	E
Kentucky	1	0	2	0	0	0	0	3	7	3
Coastal Carolina	0	0	0	2	0	0	0	2	4	2
Starting pitchers: UK: Mike Berry; CC: Jeff Richard; WP: Mike Berry LP: Jeff Richard Sv: None; Home runs: UK: None; CC: None; Attendance: N/A; Boxscore

== See also ==
- 2009 NCBA Division I World Series

== Notes ==
- VCU's victory of Hofstra in the first round set NCBA Division II World Series records for most runs scored by a single team in one game (20) and the largest margin of victory (18) in a NCBA Division II World Series game. Those records still stand as of 2014.
- Kentucky became the first and currently only school to repeat as NCBA Division II National Champions. Unless a team wins a title that fields both a Division I and II team, Kentucky will likely be the only repeat champion for quite a while because of new rules regarding automatic promotion to Division I for Division II teams that began on 7/1/13 which includes a team winning the NCBA Division II World Series.
