= Eléona Uhl =

Austrian-born Swiss writer (born 1961)

- Born: Eléona Milanizadeh; 15 September 1961 (age 64)

Eléona Uhl (born Eléona Milanizadeh; 15 September 1961) is an Austrian-born Swiss writer who writes primarily in French. In 1993, she was lauded by the Société des artistes et poètes de France for Sospiro. The following year, she won a short story prize for Page blanche. She has written three novels, the first, Schlott, was published in 2016 and the second, Sans Elle, in 2013. Her third novel, Le Chant de Mala, was published by Éditions de l'Hebe in 2020.

== Life ==
Uhl was born Eléona Milanizadeh on 15 September 1961 in Austria to an Austrian mother and Iranian father. The family moved to Switzerland when Eleona was three years old, at first living in the Swiss Jura and then in the canton of Vaud. Uhl now lives in Vevey. Uhl earned a Bachelor of Arts in 1980. Uhl has taught classical and contemporary dance, and also worked in hospitality. Uhl married young, and lived with her husband and daughter in Valais, where she worked in the family business. After separating from her husband, she moved back to Vaud, where she arranged meetings with artistic friends, and began writing, destroying her first manuscript.

In 1993, she was lauded by the Société des artistes et poètes de France for Sospiro. The following year, she won a short story prize for Page blanche. She has written three novels, Schlott (2016) and Sans Elle (2013). In 2020 Éditions de l'Hebe published her third novel, Le Chant de Mala, which is in the style of magical realism and explores themes of motherhood, love and diversity. Uhl was among the Swiss authors selected to be represented at the Frankfurt Book Fair in 1998.
