= 2012 NCBA Division I World Series =

American collegiate baseball competition

The 2012 National Club Baseball Association (NCBA) Division I World Series was played at Golden Park in Columbus, GA from May 25 to May 31. The twelfth tournament's champion was Utah State University.

== Format ==
The format is similar to the NCAA College World Series in that eight teams participate in two four-team double elimination brackets. There are a few differences between the NCAA and the NCBA format. One of which is that the losers of Games 1-4 move to the other half of the bracket. Another difference is that the NCBA plays a winner take all for its national title game while the NCAA has a best-of-3 format to determine its national champion.

== Participants ==
Seeding	School	Region
1	Georgia	South Atlantic
2	Texas Tech	Gulf Coast
3	Appalachian State	Mid-Atlantic
4	UC-San Diego	Southern Pacific
5	Utah State	Northern Pacific
6	Colorado State	Mid-America
7	Pittsburgh	North Atlantic
8	Illinois	Great Lakes

== Results ==
=== Bracket ===
First Round
1	Georgia	7
8	Illinois	4
4	UC-San Diego	3
5	Utah State	9
2	Texas Tech	6
3	Appalachian State	3
2	Texas State	7
7	Pittsburgh	10
3	Appalachian State	5
6	Colorado State	7
8	Illinois	8
4	UC-San Diego	5

Second Round
1	Georgia	0
5	Utah State	3
2	Texas Tech	9
1	Georgia	8
7	Pittsburgh	8*
6	Colorado State	6*
8	Illinois	6
6	Colorado State	7

Semifinals
5	Utah State	2*	-
2	Texas Tech	1*	-
7	Pittsburgh	3*	5
6	Colorado State	4*	6

Championship Game
5	Utah State	14	-	-
6	Colorado State	3	-	-

* denotes extra inning game

=== Game Results ===
Date	Game	Time	Winner	Score	Loser	Notes
May 25	Game 1	11:00 AM	Colorado State	7-5	Appalachian State	
May 25	Game 2	3:15 PM	Pittsburgh	10-7	Texas Tech	
May 25	Game 3	7:30 PM	Georgia	7-4	Illinois	
May 26	Game 4	11:00 AM	Utah State	9-3	UC-San Diego	
May 26	Game 5	3:15 PM	Texas Tech	6-3	Appalachian State	Appalachian State eliminated
May 27	Game 6	11:00 AM	Illinois	8-5	UC-San Diego	UC-San Diego eliminated
May 27	Game 7	3:15 PM	Pittsburgh	8-6 (11 innings)	Colorado State	
May 27	Game 8	7:30 PM	Utah State	3-0	Georgia	
May 28	Game 9	3:15 PM	Texas Tech	9-8	Georgia	Georgia eliminated
May 28	Game 10	7:30 PM	Colorado State	7-6	Illinois	Illinois eliminated
May 29	Game 11	3:15 PM	Utah State	2-1 (16 innings)	Texas Tech	Texas Tech eliminated
May 29	Game 12	7:30 PM	Colorado State	4-3 (10 innings)	Pittsburgh	
May 30	Game 13	3:15 PM	Game not needed			
May 30	Game 14	7:30 PM	Colorado State	6-5	Pittsburgh	Pittsburgh eliminated
May 31	Game 15	7:30 PM	Utah State	14-3	Colorado State	Utah State wins the NCBA Division I World Series

=== Championship Game ===
Thursday, May 31 7:30 PM at Columbus, GA
Team	1	2	3	4	5	6	7	8	9	R	H	E
Colorado State	0	0	0	0	0	0	1	0	2	3	9	5
Utah State	0	1	3	0	0	5	0	5	X	14	15	1
Starting pitchers: CSU: Travis Childs; USU: Kyle Durrant; WP: Kyle Durrant LP: Travis Childs Sv: None; Home runs: CSU: None; USU: Gavin Johnson; Attendance: N/A; Boxscore

== See also ==
- 2012 NCBA Division II World Series
