= 2010 NCBA Division I World Series =

American collegiate baseball competition

The 2010 National Club Baseball Association (NCBA) Division I World Series was played at City of Palms Park in Fort Myers, FL from May 28 to June 3. The tenth tournament's champion was Colorado State University. This was Colorado State's sixth title in the last seven years and third in a row. The Most Valuable Player was Tommy Johnson of Colorado State University.

== Format ==
The format is similar to the NCAA College World Series in that eight teams participate in two four-team double elimination brackets with the only difference being that in the NCBA, there is only one game that decides the national championship rather than a best-of-3 like the NCAA.

== Participants ==
Seeding	School	Region
1	Weber State	Northern Pacific
2	Colorado State	Mid-America
3	Arizona	Southern Pacific
4	Penn State	North Atlantic
5	Texas A&M	Gulf Coast
6	Virginia Tech	Mid-Atlantic
7	Georgia	South Atlantic
8	Central Michigan	Great Lakes

== Results ==
=== Bracket ===
First Round
1	Weber State	8
8	Central Michigan	2
4	Penn State	5
'5	Texas A&M	2
8	Central Michigan	15
5	Texas A&M	17
2	Colorado State	19
7	Georgia	2
3	Arizona	7
6	Virginia Tech	12
7	Georgia	2
3	Arizona	4

Second Round
1	Weber State	1
4	Penn State	12
5	Texas A&M	8
1	Weber State	3
2	Colorado State	16
6	Virginia Tech	3
3	Arizona	11
6	Virginia Tech	5

Semifinals
4	Penn State	10	-
5	Texas A&M	6	-
2	Colorado State	7	-
3	Arizona	2	-

Championship Game
4	Penn State	1	-	-
2	Colorado State	7	-	-

=== Game Results ===
Date	Game	Time	Winner	Score	Loser	Notes
May 28	Game 1	11:00 AM	Virginia Tech	12-7	Arizona	
May 28	Game 2	3:00 PM	Colorado State	19-2	Georgia	
May 28	Game 3	7:00 PM	Weber State	8-2	Central Michigan	
May 29	Game 4	11:00 AM	Penn State	5-2	Texas A&M	
May 29	Game 5	3:00 PM	Arizona	4-2	Georgia	Georgia eliminated
May 30	Game 6	11:00 AM	Texas A&M	17-15	Central Michigan	Central Michigan eliminated
May 30	Game 7	3:00 PM	Colorado State	16-3	Virginia Tech	
May 30	Game 8	7:00 PM	Penn State	12-1	Weber State	
May 31	Game 9	3:00 PM	Texas A&M	8-3	Weber State	Weber State eliminated
May 31	Game 10	7:00 PM	Arizona	11-5	Virginia Tech	Virginia Tech eliminated
June 1	Game 11	3:00 PM	Penn State	10-6	Texas A&M	Texas A&M eliminated
June 1	Game 12	7:00 PM	Colorado State	7-2	Arizona	Arizona eliminated
June 2	Game 13	3:00 PM	Game not needed			
June 2	Game 14	3:00 PM or 7:00 PM	Game not needed			
June 3	Game 15	7:00 PM	Colorado State	7-1	Penn State	Colorado State wins NCBA Division I World Series

=== Championship Game ===
Thursday, June 3 7:00 pm Fort Myers, Florida
Team	1	2	3	4	5	6	7	8	9	R	H	E
Penn State	0	0	0	0	0	0	0	1	0	1	8	2
Colorado State	0	0	0	1	0	0	4	2	X	7	10	1
Starting pitchers: PSU: Weston Hillegas; CSU: Bobby Moller; WP: Bobby Moller LP: Weston Hillegas Sv: None; Home runs: PSU: None; CSU: Thomas Johnson, Josh Ary; Attendance: N/A; Boxscore

== See also ==
- 2010 NCBA Division I Tournament
- 2010 NCBA Division II World Series
- 2010 NCBA Division II Tournament
