= 2012 NCBA Division II World Series =

American collegiate baseball competition

The 2012 National Club Baseball Association (NCBA) Division II World Series was played at Golden Park in Columbus, GA from May 18 to May 22. The fifth tournament's champion was Hofstra University.

== Format ==
The format is similar to the NCAA College World Series in that eight teams participate in two four-team double elimination brackets. There are a few differences between the NCAA and the NCBA format. One of which is that the losers of Games 1–4 move to the other half of the bracket. Another difference is that the NCBA plays a winner take all for its national title game while the NCAA has a best-of-3 format to determine its national champion. Another difference which is between NCBA Division I and II is that Division II games are 7 innings while Division I games are 9 innings.

== Participants ==
- Hofstra
- Illinois†
- Kennesaw State
- Maryland†
- Penn State†
- Texas A&M Corps of Cadets
- Wisconsin†
- Wyoming

† denotes school also fielded an NCBA Division I team that season

== Results ==
=== Game results ===
Date	Game	Time	Winner	Score	Loser	Notes
May 18	Game 1	10:00 AM	Illinois	2–0	Wyoming	
May 18	Game 2	1:00 PM	Kennesaw State	3–2 (9 innings)	Maryland	
May 18	Game 3	4:00 PM	Hofstra	9–5	Texas A&M Corps of Cadets	
May 18	Game 4	7:30 PM	Wisconsin	4–1	Penn State	
May 19	Game 5	10:00 AM	Texas A&M Corps of Cadets	5–1	Maryland	Maryland eliminated
May 19	Game 6	1:00 PM	Penn State	5–4 (9 innings)	Wyoming	Wyoming eliminated
May 19	Game 7	4:00 PM	Hofstra	12–8	Kennesaw State	
May 19	Game 8	7:00 PM	Illinois	4–2	Wisconsin	
May 20	Game 9	4:00 PM	Kennesaw State	5–3	Penn State	Penn State eliminated
May 20	Game 10	7:00 PM	Wisconsin	5–1	Texas A&M Corps of Cadets	Texas A&M Corps of Cadets eliminated
May 21	Game 11	10:00 AM	Kennesaw State	4–1	Hofstra	
May 21	Game 12	1:00 PM	Illinois	5–0	Wisconsin	Wisconsin eliminated
May 21	Game 13	4:00 PM	Hofstra	9–7	Kennesaw State	Kennesaw State eliminated
May 21	Game 14	7:00 PM	Game not needed			
May 22	Game 15	7:00 PM	Hofstra	5–1	Illinois	Hofstra wins the NCBA Division II World Series

=== Championship game ===
Tuesday, May 22 7:00 PM Columbus, GA
Team	1	2	3	4	5	6	7	R	H	E
Hofstra	4	0	1	0	0	0	0	5	7	1
Illinois	0	0	0	0	0	1	0	1	2	0
Starting pitchers: HOF: Brian Adler; ILL: Matt Wozniak; WP: Brian Adler LP: Matt Wozniak Sv: None; Home runs: HOF: Joe Elio; ILL: None; Attendance: N/A; Boxscore

== Notes ==
- Hofstra's 5–1 title game victory over Illinois set an NCBA Division II World Series record for largest margin of victory in a championship game. This record still holds through the 2013 season as this could be broken in the 2014 title game.

== See also ==
- 2012 NCBA Division I World Series
