= 2004 NCBA World Series =

American collegiate baseball competition

The 2004 National Club Baseball Association (NCBA) World Series was played at McKechnie Field in Bradenton, FL from May 26 to May 31. The fourth tournament's champion was Colorado State University. The co-MVP's were Andrew Abell and Thomas Ahrens, both of Colorado State University.

== Format ==
The format is similar to the NCAA College World Series in that eight teams participate in two four-team double elimination brackets with the only difference being that in the NCBA, there is only one game that decides the national championship rather than a best-of-3 like the NCAA. A major difference between the NCAA and NCBA World Series is that NCBA World Series games were only 7 innings (until 2006) while NCAA games are 9 innings.

== Participants ==
Seeding	School	Region
1	Colorado State	Rocky Mountain
2	Penn State	Northeast Atlantic
3	North Carolina State	Southeast Atlantic
4	Central Michigan	Great Lakes
5	Texas A&M	Gulf Coast
6	Wisconsin-Eau Claire	Mid-America
7	James Madison	Mid-Atlantic
8	Oregon	Northern Pacific

== Results ==
=== Bracket ===
First Round
1	Colorado State	10
8	Oregon	1
4	Central Michigan	2
5	Texas A&M	6
8	Oregon	6
4	Central Michigan	9
2	Penn State	8
7	James Madison	4
3	NC State	4
6	UW-Eau Claire	5
7	James Madison	2
3	NC State	3

Second Round
1	Colorado State	8
5	Texas A&M	0
4	Central Michigan	5
5	Texas A&M	9
2	Penn State	8
6	UW-Eau Claire	4
3	NC State	14
6	UW-Eau Claire	3

Semifinals
1	Colorado State	3	6
5	Texas A&M	4	0
2	Penn State	1	4
3	NC State	7	5

Championship Game
1	Colorado State	8	-	-
3	NC State	1	-	-

=== Game Results ===
Date	Game	Time	Winner	Score	Loser	Notes
May 26	Game 1	9:30 AM	Colorado State	10-1	Oregon	
May 26	Game 2	12:30 PM	Penn State	8-4	James Madison	
May 26	Game 3	3:30 PM	UW-Eau Claire	5-4	North Carolina State	
May 27	Game 4	10:00 AM	Texas A&M	6-2	Central Michigan	
May 27	Game 5	1:00 PM	North Carolina State	3-2	James Madison	James Madison eliminated
May 28	Game 6	9:30 AM	Central Michigan	9-6	Oregon	Oregon eliminated
May 28	Game 7	12:30 PM	Colorado State	8-0	Texas A&M	
May 28	Game 8	3:30 PM	Penn State	8-4	UW-Eau Claire	
May 29	Game 9	10:00 AM	Texas A&M	9-5	Central Michigan	Central Michigan eliminated
May 29	Game 10	1:00 PM	North Carolina State	14-3	UW-Eau Claire	UW-Eau Claire eliminated
May 30	Game 11	9:30 AM	Texas A&M	4-2	Colorado State	
May 30	Game 12	12:30 PM	North Carolina State	7-1	Penn State	
May 30	Game 13	3:30 PM	Colorado State	6-0	Texas A&M	Texas A&M eliminated
May 30	Game 14	7:30 PM	North Carolina State	5-4	Penn State	Penn State eliminated
May 31	Game 15	1:00 PM	Colorado State	8-1	North Carolina State	Colorado State wins NCBA World Series

== See also ==
- 2004 NCBA Regional Tournament
