= 2009 NCBA Division I World Series =

American collegiate baseball competition

The 2009 National Club Baseball Association (NCBA) Division I World Series was played at City of Palms Park in Fort Myers, FL from May 22 to May 28. The ninth tournament's champion was Colorado State University. This was Colorado State's fifth title in the last six years and second in a row. The Most Valuable Player was Bobby Moller of Colorado State University.

== Format ==
The format is similar to the NCAA College World Series in that eight teams participate in two four-team double elimination brackets with the only difference being that in the NCBA, there is only one game that decides the national championship rather than a best-of-3 like the NCAA.

== Participants ==
Seeding	School	Region
1	Colorado State	Mid-America
2	Arizona	Southern Pacific
3	Illinois	Great Lakes
4	Weber State	Northern Pacific
5	Clemson	South Atlantic
6	Penn State	North Atlantic
7	Sam Houston State	Gulf Coast
8	Maryland	Mid-Atlantic

== Results ==
=== Bracket ===
First Round
1	Colorado State	6
8	Maryland	10
4	Weber State	7
5	Clemson	8
1	Colorado State	2
4	Weber State	1
2	Arizona	5
7	Sam Houston State	7
3	Illinois	0
6	Penn State	7
2	Arizona	7
3	Illinois	3

Second Round
8	Maryland	11
5	Clemson	5
1	Colorado State	7
5	Clemson	3
7	Sam Houston State	5
6	Penn State	3
2	Arizona	10
6	Penn State	5

Semifinals
8	Maryland	7	3
1	Colorado State	25	4
7	Sam Houston State	0	4
2	Arizona	6	16

Championship Game
1	Colorado State	3	-	-
2	Arizona	1	-	-

=== Game Results ===
Date	Game	Time	Winner	Score	Loser	Notes
May 22	Game 1	11:00 AM	Penn State	7-0	Illinois	
May 22	Game 2	3:00 PM	Sam Houston State	7-5	Arizona	
May 22	Game 3	7:30 PM	Maryland	10-6	Colorado State	
May 23	Game 4	11:00 AM	Clemson	8-7	Weber State	
May 23	Game 5	3:00 PM	Arizona	7-3	Illinois	Illinois eliminated
May 24	Game 6	11:00 AM	Colorado State	2-1	Weber State	Weber State eliminated
May 24	Game 7	3:00 PM	Sam Houston State	5-3	Penn State	
May 24	Game 8	7:30 PM	Maryland	11-5	Clemson	
May 25	Game 9	3:00 PM	Colorado State	7-3	Clemson	Clemson eliminated
May 25	Game 10	7:30 PM	Arizona	10-5	Penn State	Penn State eliminated
May 26	Game 11	3:00 PM	Colorado State	25-7	Maryland	
May 26	Game 12	7:30 PM	Arizona	6-0	Sam Houston State	
May 27	Game 13	3:00 PM	Colorado State	4-3	Maryland	Maryland eliminated
May 27	Game 14	7:30 PM	Arizona	16-4	Sam Houston State	Sam Houston State eliminated
May 28	Game 15	7:30 PM	Colorado State	3-1	Arizona	Colorado State wins NCBA World Series

=== Championship Game ===
Thursday, May 28 7:30 pm Fort Myers, Florida
Team	1	2	3	4	5	6	7	8	9	R	H	E
Arizona	0	0	0	0	0	0	1	0	0	1	4	2
Colorado State	1	2	0	1	0	0	0	0	X	3	7	1
Starting pitchers: UA: Brandon Thielk; CSU: Bobby Moller; WP: Bobby Moller LP: Brandon Thielk Sv: Nicholas Jeanette; Home runs: UA: None; CSU: Hunter Haggerty; Attendance: N/A; Boxscore

== See also ==
- 2009 NCBA Division II World Series
