= 2014 NCBA Division I Tournament =

American collegiate baseball competition

The 2014 National Club Baseball Association (NCBA) Division I Tournament was a post-season tournament for the best teams in the NCBA during the 2014 season. 32 NCBA Division I college baseball teams met after playing their way through the regular season to play in the NCBA Tournament. The tournament will culminate with eight teams competing for the 2014 NCBA Division I World Series at University of Tampa Baseball Stadium in Tampa, FL.

== Regionals ==
The opening rounds of the tournament were played across eight pre-determined sites across the country, each consisting of a four-team field. Each regional is double elimination. The winner of each regional advances to the NCBA World Series.

Bold indicates winner. The #4 seed is the at-large team in each region.

=== South Atlantic Regional ===
at LaGrange, GA

First Round; May 2nd-3rd
**1**	**Central Florida**	**8**
3	Clemson	3
2	Alabama	1
**4**	**Florida**	**12**
Lower round 1
**3**	**Clemson**	**8**
2	Alabama	5

Second Round; May 3rd
1	Central Florida	4
**4**	**Florida**	**9**
Lower final
3	Clemson	2
**1**	**Central Florida**	**4**

Championship; May 4th
**4**	**Florida**
1	Central Florida

=== Southern Pacific Regional ===
at Riverside, CA

First Round; May 2nd-3rd
1	UCLA	3
**4**	**California**	**5**
2	UC Davis	5
**3**	**Long Beach State**	**6**
Lower round 1
1	UCLA	10
**2**	**UC Davis**	**11**

Second Round; May 3rd
**4**	**California**	**6**
3	Long Beach State	1
Lower final
2	UC Davis	1
**3**	**Long Beach State**	**8**

Championship; May 4th
**4**	**California**
3	Long Beach State

=== Gulf Coast Regional ===
at McKinney, TX

First Round; May 9th-10th
**1**	**Texas Tech**	**4**
4	Texas	3
**2**	**Texas A&M**	**12**
3	Texas State	2
Lower round 1
**4**	**Texas**	**6**
3	Texas State	4

Second Round; May 10th
1	Texas Tech	1
**2**	**Texas A&M**	**3**
Lower final
**4**	**Texas**	**13**
1	Texas Tech	4

Championship; May 11th
2	Texas A&M
**4**	**Texas**

=== Mid-Atlantic Regional ===
at Martinsville, VA

First Round; May 9th-10th
**1**	**East Carolina**	**10**
4	Maryland	3
**2**	**James Madison**	**11**
3	Ohio	8
Lower round 1
**4**	**Maryland**	**7**
3	Ohio	2

Second Round; May 10th
**1**	**East Carolina**	**12**
2	James Madison	2
Lower final
**4**	**Maryland**	**10**
2	James Madison	4

Championship; May 11th
**1**	**East Carolina**
4	Maryland

=== North Atlantic Regional ===
at Oneonta, NY

First Round; May 9th-10th
**1**	**Pittsburgh**	**12**
4	Drexel	2
**2**	**Delaware**	**7**
3	Massachusetts	6
Lower round 1
**4**	**Drexel**	**10**
3	Massachusetts	5

Second Round; May 10th
1	Pittsburgh	2
**2**	**Delaware**	**13**
Lower final
**4**	**Drexel**	**8**
1	Pittsburgh	6

Championship; May 11th
**2**	**Delaware**
4	Drexel

=== Great Lakes Regional ===
at Battle Creek, MI

First Round; May 9th-10th
1	Michigan	3
**4**	**Illinois**	**4**
**2**	**Illinois State**	**11**
3	Wisconsin	10
Lower round 1
1	Michigan	5
**3**	**Wisconsin**	**13**

Second Round; May 10th
4	Illinois	2
**2**	**Illinois State**	**6**
Lower final
**3**	**Wisconsin**	**4**
4	Illinois	2

Championship; May 11th
2	Illinois State
**3**	**Wisconsin**

=== Mid-America Regional ===
at Topeka, KS

First Round; May 9th-10th
1	Missouri	1
**4**	**Colorado State**	**12**
**2**	**Iowa**	**6**
3	Wyoming	2
Lower round 1
1	Missouri	11
**3**	**Wyoming**	**12**

Second Round; May 10th
**4**	**Colorado State**	**6**
2	Iowa	3
Lower final
3	Wyoming	2
**2**	**Iowa**	**7**

Championship; May 11th
**4**	**Colorado State**
2	Iowa

=== Northern Pacific Regional ===
at Missoula, MT

First Round; May 9th-10th
**1**	**Utah State**	**6**
4	Montana	3
2	Oregon	6
**3**	**Eastern Washington**	**19**
Lower round 1
4	Montana	4
**2**	**Oregon**	**7**

Second Round; May 10th
**1**	**Utah State**	**17**
3	Eastern Washington	7
Lower final
2	Oregon	4
**3**	**Eastern Washington**	**13**

Championship; May 11th
**1**	**Utah State**
3	Eastern Washington

- Montana's participation in the 2014 NCBA Division I Regional was vacated due to use of an ineligible player
