= 2014 NCBA Division II Tournament =

American collegiate baseball competition

The 2014 National Club Baseball Association (NCBA) Division II Tournament was a post-season tournament for the best teams in the NCBA during the 2014 season. 30 NCBA Division II college baseball teams met after playing their way through the regular season to play in the NCBA Tournament. The tournament culminated with eight teams competing for the 2014 NCBA Division II World Series at Brooks Stadium in Paducah, KY.

== Districts ==
The opening rounds of the tournament were played across eight pre-determined sites across the country, each consisting of a four-team field except for District VII, which consisted of a two-team best-of-three format. All other districts were double elimination. The winner of each district advances to the NCBA Division II World Series.

=== District I ===
at Rome, NY

First Round
1	Monmouth	3
4	SUNY-Buffalo	10
2	SUNY-Brockport	10
3	SUNY-Oneonta	0
Lower round 1
1	Monmouth	5
3	SUNY-Oneonta	0

Semi-Finals
4	SUNY-Buffalo	2
2	SUNY-Brockport	4
Lower final
1	Monmouth	14
4	SUNY-Buffalo	9

Finals
2	SUNY-Brockport
1	Monmouth

- Note: The district championship game between Monmouth and Brockport was moved to Endwell, NY due to weather.

=== District II ===
at State College, PA

First Round
1	Penn State	13
3	George Mason	2
2	St. Joseph's (PA)	15
4	Loyola (MD)	2
Lower round 1
3	George Mason	4
4	Loyola (MD)	6

Semi-Finals
1	Penn State	4
2	St. Joseph's (PA)	14
Lower final
4	Loyola (MD	1
1	Penn State	11

Finals
2	St. Joseph's (PA)
1	Penn State

=== District III ===
at Martinsville, VA

First Round
1	William & Mary	4
4	Old Dominion	3
2	USC-Union	11
3	UNC-Wilmington	1
Lower round 1
4	Old Dominion	3
3	UNC-Wilmington	9

Semi-Finals
1	William & Mary	7
2	USC-Union	6
Lower final
3	UNC-Wilmington	8
2	USC-Union	9

Finals
1	William & Mary
2	USC-Union

=== District IV ===
at Columbus, OH

First Round
1	Akron	4
4	Ohio State	0
2	California (PA)	2
3	Eastern Kentucky	4
Lower round 1
4	Ohio State	2
2	California (PA)	3

Semi-Finals
1	Akron	6
3	Eastern Kentucky	2
Lower final
2	California (PA)	11
3	Eastern Kentucky	4

Finals
1	Akron
2	California (PA)

=== District V ===
at Sheboygan, WI

First Round
1	Grand Valley State	3
4	Minnesota	4
2	MSU-Moorhead	7
3	Wisconsin	4
Lower round 1
1	Grand Valley State	10
3	Wisconsin	5

Semi-Finals
4	Minnesota	2
2	MSU-Moorhead	5
Lower final
1	Grand Valley State	11
4	Minnesota	2

Finals
2	MSU-Moorhead
1	Grand Valley State

=== District VI ===
at St. Louis, MO

First Round
1	Illinois	7
3	Arkansas	6
2	Central Missouri	6
4	Saint Louis	4
Lower round 1
3	Arkansas	2
4	Saint Louis	10

Semi-Finals
1	Illinois	3
2	Central Missouri	4
Lower final
4	Saint Louis	7
1	Illinois	2

Finals
2	Central Missouri
4	Saint Louis

=== District VII ===
at Houston, TX

Final (Best-of-3)
1	Texas A&M CofC	6	12	-
2	Tulane	4	0	-

=== District VIII ===
at Cedar City, UT

First Round
1	Colorado Mines	9
3	San Diego	5
2	UC-Colorado Springs	12
4	Colorado Mesa	16
Lower round 1
3	San Diego	8
2	UC-Colorado Springs	10

Semi-Finals
1	Colorado Mines	0
4	Colorado Mesa	2
Lower final
2	UC-Colorado Springs	4
1	Colorado Mines	6

Finals
4	Colorado Mesa
1	Colorado Mines
