= Huntingburg, Indiana =

- City
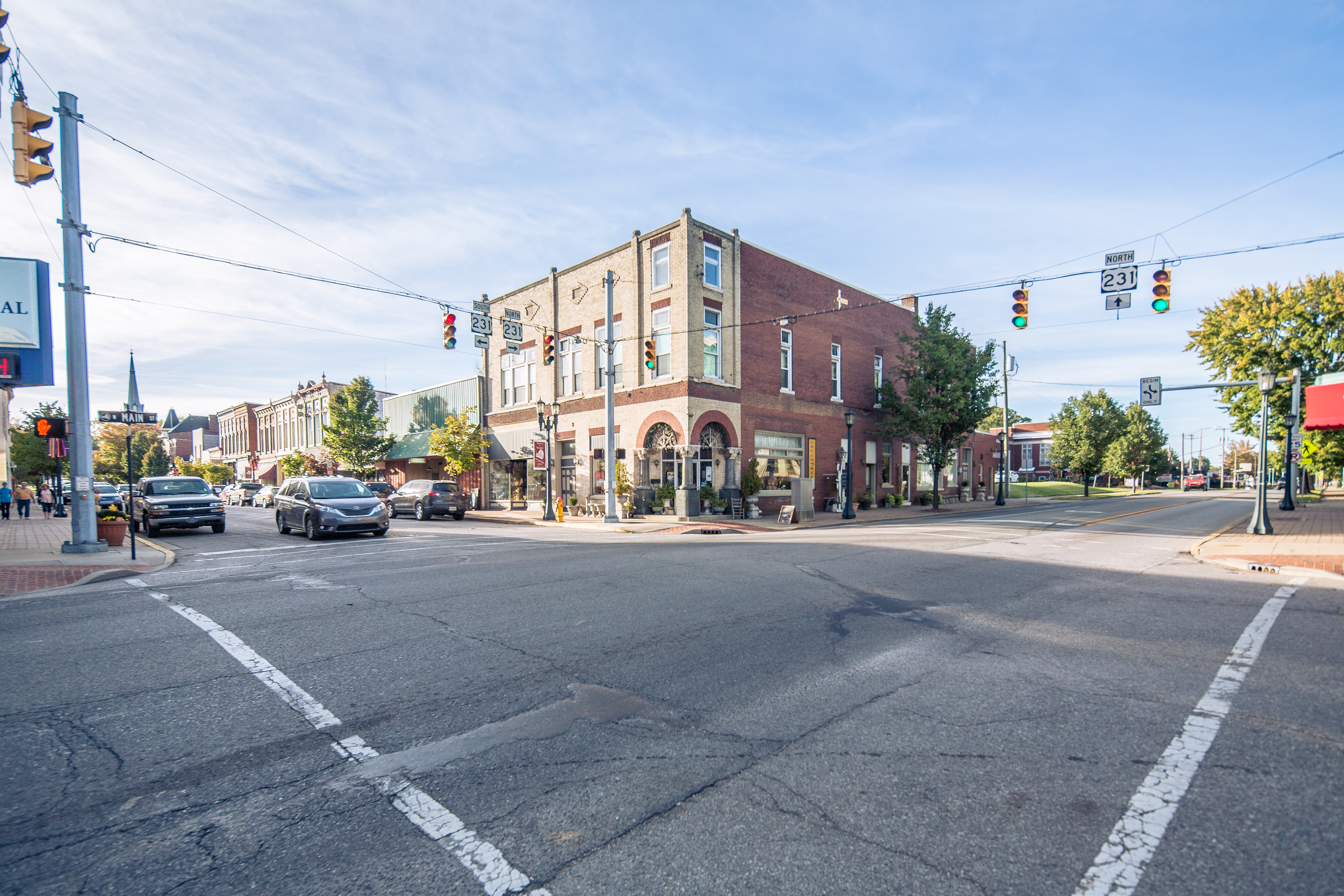

- Logo
- Nickname: "Hollywood of the Midwest"
- Motto: "A City Like No Other!"
- Location of Huntingburg in Dubois County, Indiana.
- Coordinates: 38°18′04″N 86°57′44″W
- Country: United States
- State: Indiana
- County: Dubois
- Township: Patoka

Government
  - Mayor: Neil Elkins (R)

Area
  - Total: 5.27 sq mi (13.64 km^{2})
  - Land: 5.05 sq mi (13.09 km^{2})
  - Water: 0.21 sq mi (0.55 km^{2})
- Elevation: 495 ft (151 m)

Population (2020)
  - Total: 6,362
  - Density: 1,258.9/sq mi (486.05/km^{2})
- Time zone: UTC-5 (Eastern (EST))
  - Summer (DST): UTC-4 (EDT)
- ZIP code: 47542
- Area codes: 812, 930
- FIPS code: 18-35284
- GNIS feature ID: 2394451
- Website: www.huntingburg-in.gov

Huntingburg is a city in Patoka Township, Dubois County, in the U.S. state of Indiana. The population was 6,362 at the 2020 census.

Located in southwestern Indiana, the city is known for its downtown with numerous antique shops. It is part of the Jasper Micropolitan Statistical Area. The city is also known as the "Hollywood of the Midwest." The movies A League of Their Own (1992), Hard Rain (1998), and the HBO film Soul of the Game (1996) were filmed in Huntingburg. Columbia Pictures renovated the grandstand at League Stadium that was to become part of the set for A League of Their Own.

== History ==
Huntingburg was platted in 1837 by Colonel Jacob Geiger who purchased 1,920 acres (7.8 km^{2}) of land and became one of the city's first permanent settlers. It was likely so named because the site had been a popular hunting ground. Huntingburg was incorporated as a town in 1866.

The Huntingburg Commercial Historic District and Huntingburg Town Hall and Fire Engine House are listed on the National Register of Historic Places.

The Huntingburg post office has been in operation since 1842.

As part of Dubois County, Huntingburg re-entered the Eastern Time Zone on November 4, 2007, after 15 months on the Central Time Zone.

On May 14, 2020, during the 2019-20 coronavirus pandemic, the city's local meat processing plant run by Farbest Foods reported 42 cases of COVID-19 among the employees, resulting in an 2-day closure beginning on May 18.

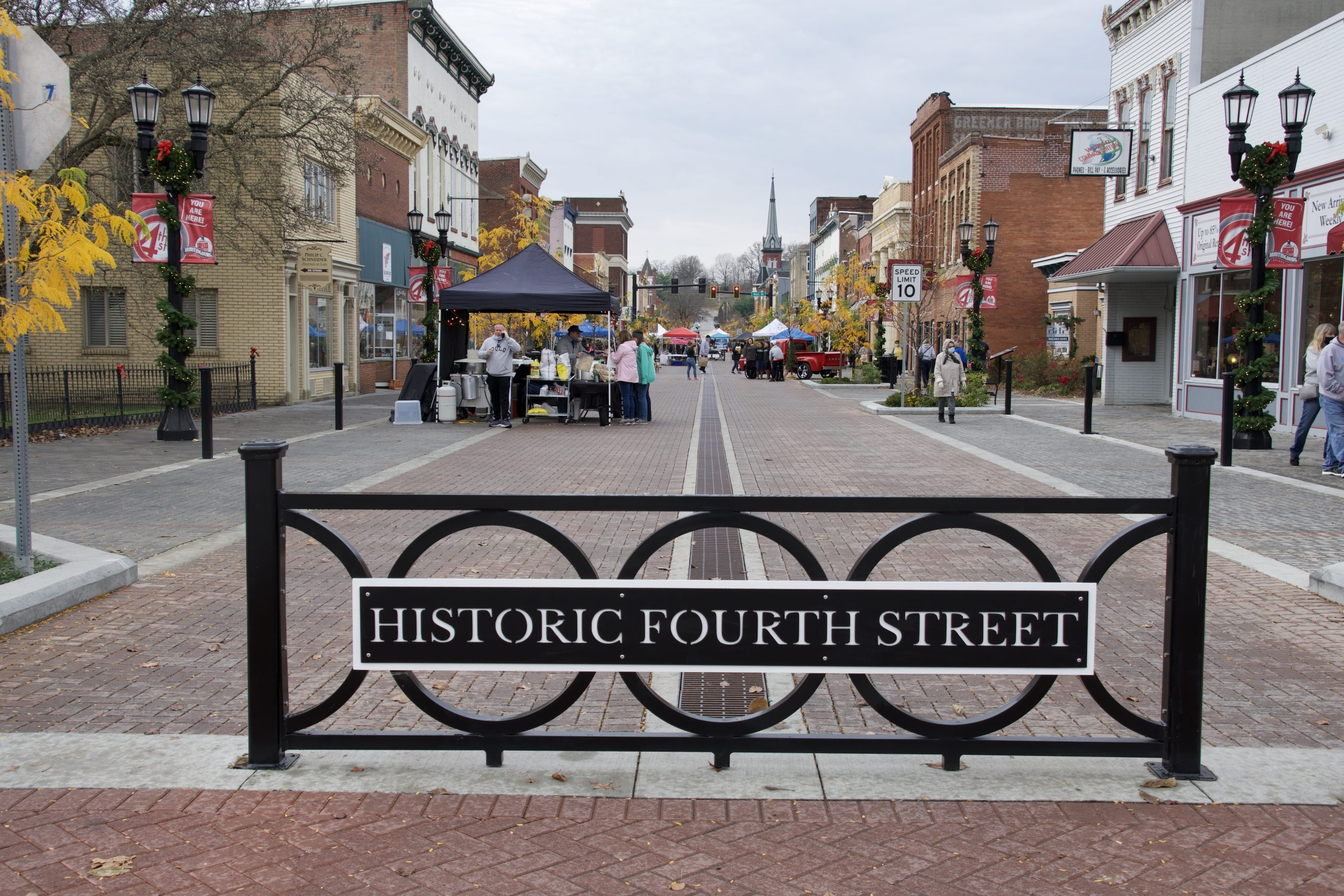
A street market event at Huntingburg Historic 4th Street

== Geography ==
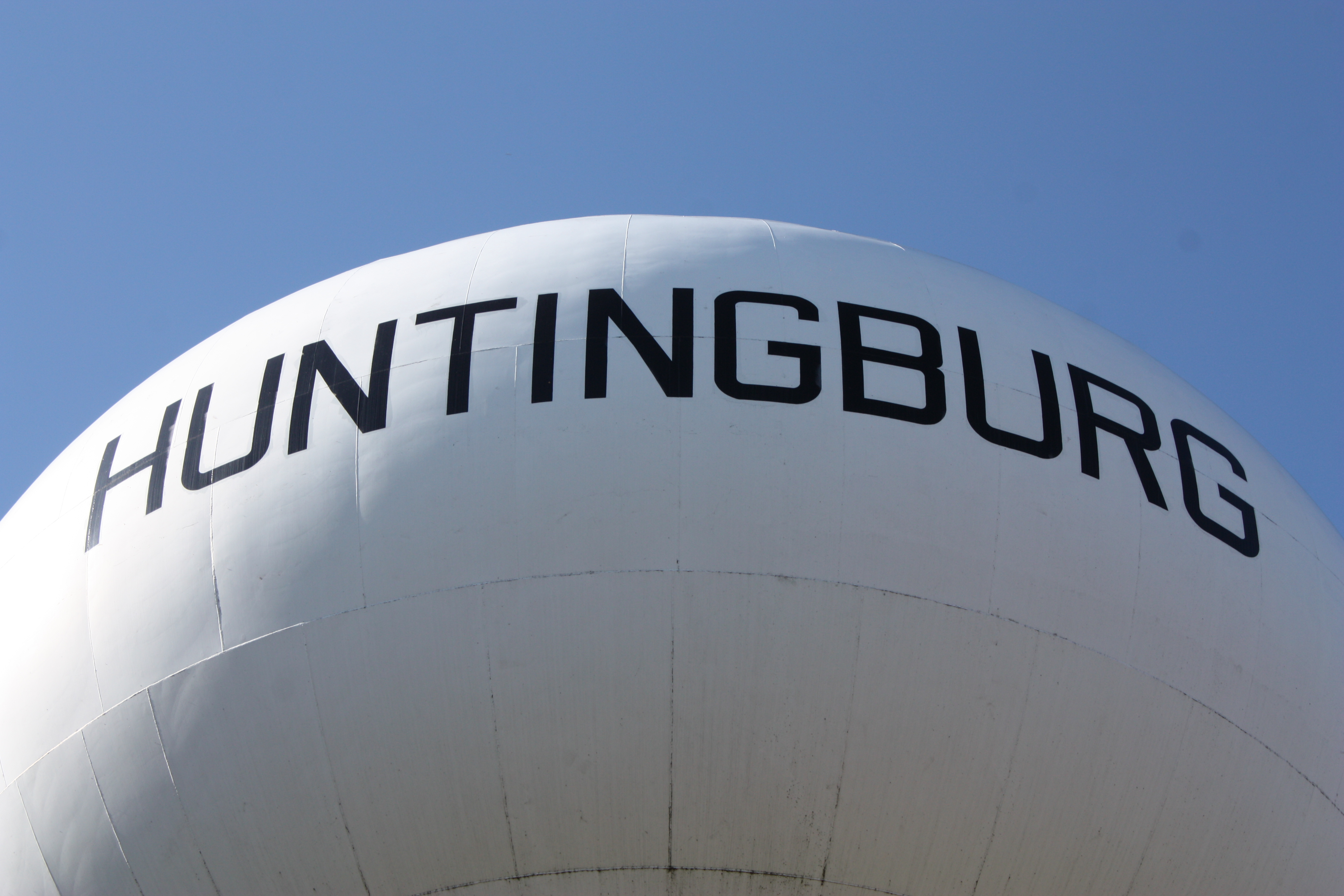
One of Huntingburg's water towers

According to the 2010 census, Huntingburg has a total area of 5.273 square miles (13.66 km^{2}), of which 5.06 square miles (13.11 km^{2}) (or 95.96%) is land and 0.213 square miles (0.55 km^{2}) (or 4.04%) is water.

=== Climate ===
The climate in this area is characterized by hot, humid summers and generally cool winters. According to the Köppen Climate Classification system, Huntingburg, IN has a humid subtropical climate, abbreviated "Cfa" on climate maps.

Climate data for Huntingburg, IN
Month	Jan	Feb	Mar	Apr	May	Jun	Jul	Aug	Sep	Oct	Nov	Dec	Year
Mean daily maximum °F (°C)	40.5 (4.7)	45.7 (7.6)	56.1 (13.4)	67.3 (19.6)	76.1 (24.5)	84.0 (28.9)	87.0 (30.6)	86.7 (30.4)	80.5 (26.9)	69.3 (20.7)	56.7 (13.7)	43.8 (6.6)	66.1 (19.0)
Mean daily minimum °F (°C)	22.6 (−5.2)	25.6 (−3.6)	33.9 (1.1)	43.7 (6.5)	52.9 (11.6)	62.2 (16.8)	65.9 (18.8)	64.1 (17.8)	56.3 (13.5)	44.8 (7.1)	36.8 (2.7)	26.1 (−3.3)	44.6 (7.0)
Average precipitation inches (mm)	3.3 (84)	3.1 (79)	4.3 (110)	4.4 (110)	5.6 (140)	4.2 (110)	4.4 (110)	3.2 (81)	3.5 (89)	3.5 (89)	4.3 (110)	4.0 (100)	47.8 (1,212)
Average snowfall inches (cm)	3.4 (8.6)	3.5 (8.9)	1.3 (3.3)	0 (0)	0 (0)	0 (0)	0 (0)	0 (0)	0 (0)	0.1 (0.25)	0 (0)	2.5 (6.4)	10.8 (27.45)
Average precipitation days	10	9	11	11	12	10	9	8	7	8	10	11	116
Average snowy days	3	2	1	0	0	0	0	0	0	0	0	2	8
Source: bestplaces.net

== Demographics ==
Historical population
Census	Pop.	Note	%±
1880	781		—
1890	3,167		305.5%
1900	2,527		−20.2%
1910	2,464		−2.5%
1920	3,261		32.3%
1930	3,440		5.5%
1940	3,816		10.9%
1950	4,056		6.3%
1960	4,146		2.2%
1970	4,794		15.6%
1980	5,376		12.1%
1990	5,242		−2.5%
2000	5,598		6.8%
2010	6,057		8.2%
2020	6,362		5.0%
Source: US Census Bureau

=== 2020 census ===
As of the 2020 census, Huntingburg had a population of 6,362. The median age was 36.1 years. 27.9% of residents were under the age of 18 and 14.3% of residents were 65 years of age or older. For every 100 females there were 94.5 males, and for every 100 females age 18 and over there were 94.1 males age 18 and over.

96.1% of residents lived in urban areas, while 3.9% lived in rural areas.

There were 2,488 households in Huntingburg, of which 34.4% had children under the age of 18 living in them. Of all households, 44.3% were married-couple households, 19.5% were households with a male householder and no spouse or partner present, and 27.3% were households with a female householder and no spouse or partner present. About 30.6% of all households were made up of individuals and 12.9% had someone living alone who was 65 years of age or older.

There were 2,634 housing units, of which 5.5% were vacant. The homeowner vacancy rate was 1.2% and the rental vacancy rate was 5.8%.

Racial composition as of the 2020 census
Race	Number	Percent
White	4,635	72.9%
Black or African American	62	1.0%
American Indian and Alaska Native	51	0.8%
Asian	28	0.4%
Native Hawaiian and Other Pacific Islander	0	0.0%
Some other race	1,085	17.1%
Two or more races	501	7.9%
Hispanic or Latino (of any race)	1,691	26.6%

=== Demographic estimates ===
Persons under 5 years were 7.1% of the population, and persons in poverty were 15.2% of the population.

=== 2010 census ===
As of the census of 2010, there were 6,057 people, 2,334 households, and 1,554 families residing in the city. The population density was 1,197.0 inhabitants per square mile (462.2/km^{2}). There were 2,492 housing units at an average density of 492.5 per square mile (190.2/km^{2}). The racial makeup of the city was 87.3% White, 0.5% African American, 0.2% Native American, 0.3% Asian, 9.9% from other races, and 1.8% from two or more races. Hispanic or Latino of any race were 18.5% of the population.

There were 2,334 households, of which 37.4% had children under the age of 18 living with them, 46.4% were married couples living together, 13.8% had a female householder with no husband present, 6.3% had a male householder with no wife present, and 33.4% were non-families. 28.5% of all households were made up of individuals, and 11.8% had someone living alone who was 65 years of age or older. The average household size was 2.55 and the average family size was 3.11.

The median age in the city was 35.1 years. 27.9% of residents were under the age of 18; 7.8% were between the ages of 18 and 24; 27.3% were from 25 to 44; 23.6% were from 45 to 64; and 13.5% were 65 years of age or older. The gender makeup of the city was 47.7% male and 52.3% female.

=== 2000 census ===
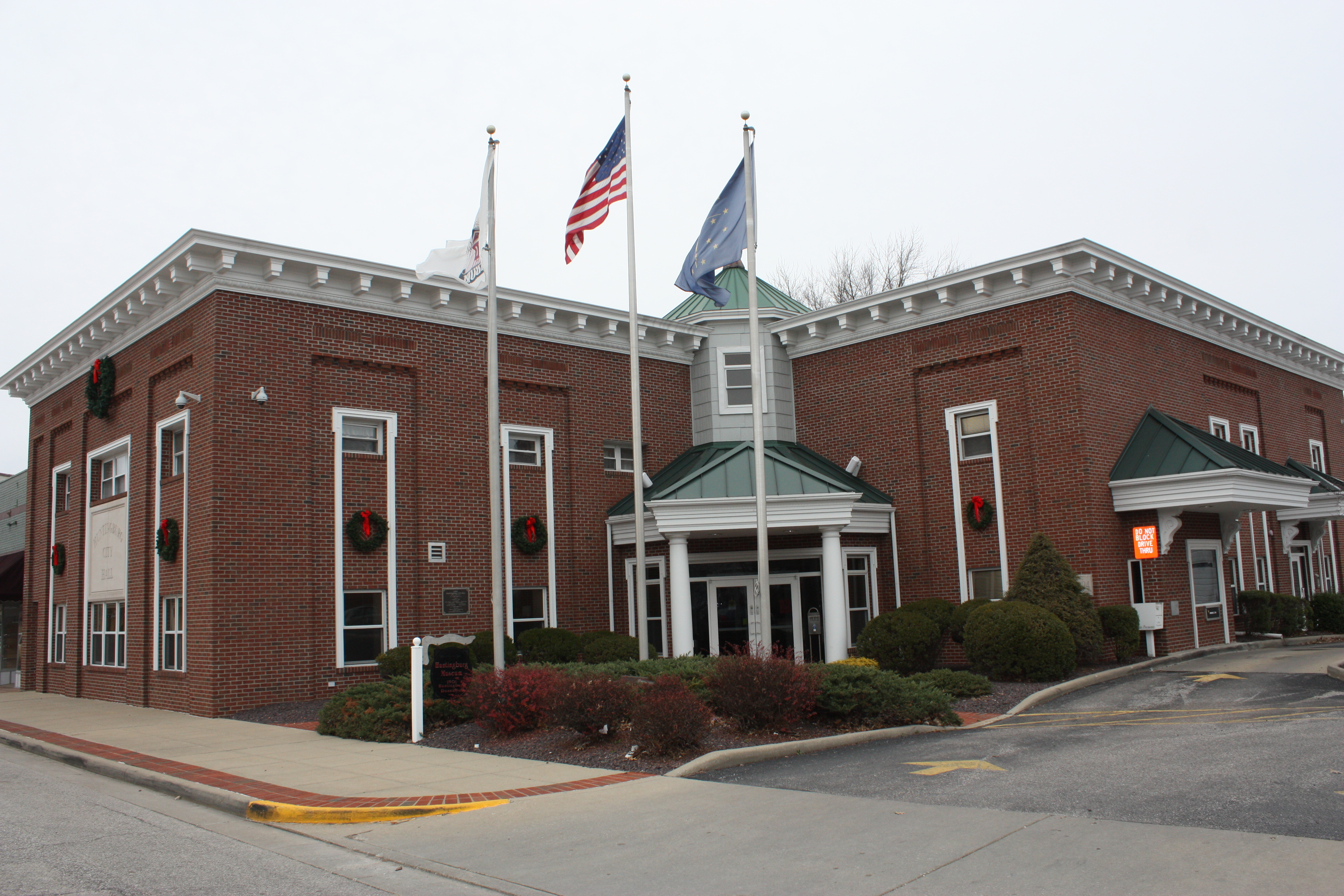
Huntingburg City Hall

As of the census of 2000, there were 5,598 people, 2,162 households, and 1,444 families residing in the city. The population density was 1,543.3 inhabitants per square mile (595.9/km^{2}). There were 2,267 housing units at an average density of 625.0 per square mile (241.3/km^{2}). The racial makeup of the city is mostly White, 92.2%, Hispanic 9.8%, African American 0.2% two races or more 0.8%.

There were 2,162 households, out of which 33.3% had children under the age of 18 living with them, 50.8% were married couples living together, 11.2% had a female householder with no husband present, and 33.2% were non-families. 28.5% of all households were made up of individuals, and 12.9% had someone living alone who was 65 years of age or older. The average household size was 2.51 and the average family size was 3.05.

In the city, the population was spread out, with 26.2% under the age of 18, 9.1% from 18 to 24, 28.3% from 25 to 44, 20.5% from 45 to 64, and 15.9% who were 65 years of age or older. The median age was 36 years. For every 100 females, there were 91.3 males. For every 100 females age 18 and over, there were 88.9 males.

The median income for a household in the city was $33,415, and the median income for a family was $41,925. Males had a median income of $29,756 versus $22,167 for females. The per capita income for the city was $15,882. About 6.8% of families and 10.8% of the population were below the poverty line, including 11.3% of those under age 18 and 9.9% of those age 65 or over.

== Education ==
It is in the Southwest Dubois County School Corporation school district. In 1972, Holland, a town west of Huntingburg along State Road 161, was consolidated into that of Huntingburg, resulting in the formation of Southwest Dubois County School Corporation, which includes the following schools:

- Southridge High School
- Southridge Middle School
- Huntingburg Elementary School
- Holland Elementary School

Prior to 1972, the community had its own high school. The school colors were black and red, and the mascot was the Happy Hunters.

The town has a free lending library, the Huntingburg Public Library.

== Culture ==
League Stadium was home to the Dubois County Dragons who played in the Heartland League (1996–1998) and the Frontier League (1999–2002). From 1996 to 2001, Huntingburg was the smallest city to host a professional baseball team. After the Dragons franchise moved, Jeff Martindale League Stadium stood empty in the summers until the Bluff City Bombers of the Central Illinois Collegiate League moved to Huntingburg in 2005 and were renamed the Dubois County Bombers. The CICL then merged with the Prospect League. As the Prospect League has a larger geographical footprint, the Bombers moved to the Ohio Valley League as of the 2013 season.

== Transportation ==
Huntingburg Airport is a public use airport located three nautical miles (6 km) south of the central business district of Huntingburg. It is owned by the Dubois County Airport Authority.

The Dubois County Railroad connects to the Norfolk Southern mainline in Huntingburg.

Huntingburg operates a public bus services, run by the City Transportation Department.

== Notable people ==
- Tim Barrett, Major league baseball player
- Ray Blemker, Major league baseball player
- John L. Bretz, member of the U.S. House of Representatives from Indiana's 2nd district
- Don Buse, ABA Champion (1973) and NBA player; NCAA Champion (1971)
- Bob Coleman, Major League Baseball player and minor league manager
- Alex Graman, Major League Baseball pitcher for New York Yankees and others
- Bill Menke, basketball player for 1940 national champion Indiana Hoosiers
- Benjamin F. Miessner, engineer and inventor
- W. Otto Miessner, composer and music teacher
- Colson Montgomery, professional baseball shortstop, Chicago White Sox
- Gordon St. Angelo, former Indiana Democratic Party chairman
- Mitch Stetter, pitcher for Milwaukee Brewers; coach in Kansas City Royals organization

== See also ==
- Uhl Pottery
