= Springfield Lucky Horseshoes =

American collegiate summer baseball team

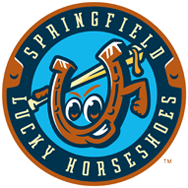
- Logo

Information
- League: Prospect League (2009–present) (Eastern Conference – Central Division)
- Location: Springfield, Illinois
- Ballpark: Robin Roberts Stadium at Lanphier Park
- Founded: 2007
- League championships: 1 (2008)
- Division championships: 1 (2023)
- Former name: Springfield Sliders (2007–2021)
- Former league: Central Illinois Collegiate League (2008)
- Colors: Americana navy, lucky penny copper, louie powder blue, clean plate white
- Retired numbers: 16, 30, 42
- Ownership: Golden Rule Entertainment
- Management: Golden Rule Entertainment & Claire Harris
- General manager: Claire Harris
- Manager: Brad Gyorkos
- Media: The State Journal-Register
- Website: shoesbaseball.com

The Springfield Lucky Horseshoes are a collegiate summer league baseball team of the Prospect League. They play at Robin Roberts Stadium at Lanphier Park and are based in the city of Springfield, Illinois. The team was established in November 2007 as the Springfield Sliders and were an expansion franchise for the 2008 season. The Lucky Horseshoes and other collegiate summer leagues and teams exist to give top college players professional-like experience without affecting NCAA eligibility.

The Central Illinois Collegiate League (CICL) season was divided into two-halves with the first half winner playing the second half winner in a best-of-three series. The Sliders dominated the first half of the 2008 season with a 20–4 record, winning by seven games. Springfield won the CICL Regular Season Championship with a 30–17 record, leaving the 2nd place team 4.5 games behind. In the 2008 playoffs, Springfield defeated the Danville Dans in three games to win the 2008 CICL Championship.

The CICL merged with the Prospect League after the 2008 season, with the Prospect League name carrying forward into the 2009 season and beyond.

The Lucky Horseshoes play in the Prospect League's Eastern Conference – Central Division along with the Danville Dans, Decatur Bean Ballers, Dubois County Bombers, and Terre Haute Rex.

== History ==
The Sliders are the third collegiate wood bat franchise in Springfield. The Springfield Capitals were the first, operating from 1963 to 1977 as a member of the CICL. After the 1977 season, the Capitals ceased operations to make way for a minor league team, the Springfield Redbirds, for the 1978 season. The Springfield Redbirds would serve as the Triple-A affiliate of the St. Louis Cardinals for four seasons, winning an American Association championship in 1980.

After the Redbirds controversially moved to Louisville for the 1982 season and became the Louisville Redbirds, Springfield was without a baseball team for one season.

The Springfield Rifles began play in 1983 and were members of the CICL through 2006. The Rifles played their home games at Lincoln Land Community College for all but one season, and suffered from extremely low attendance. Beginning in 1996 and running through 2001, Springfield was also home to the second version of the Springfield Capitals who this time were a member of the Frontier League.

The Sliders won their first game in franchise history against the Quincy Gems, 7–3.

The team won the Western Division championship in 2010 (won both halves of the season) and played in the Western Division championship series after the 2016 as the 2nd Half champions, but lost the series to the Quincy Gems.

The inclusion of the Gems in the 2016 series was controversial due to the Prospect League allowing an extra game played by the Gems to count in the standings for the season's 1st Half. The Gems and the DuPage Drones played a 31st game, while the remaining four teams only played thirty games. The Sliders, had the Gems only been able to count thirty games for the season's 1st Half, would have won both halves of the season, as they held a tiebreaker over the Gems. Such a decision would have seen the Sliders and Drones play in the Western Division championship series, as the Drones had the second-best overall season record in the division. Quincy would go on to lose the Prospect League Championship Series to the West Virginia Miners. The Prospect League has since abandoned the first half winner and second half winner playoff format, instead opting to have the two teams with the best overall season records in each division advance to their respective divisional playoffs.

On February 17, 2022, the Sliders rebranded as the Springfield Lucky Horseshoes, named after the sandwich that originated in Springfield.

== Gun giveaway controversy ==
During the 2016 season, the Sliders announced that an in-game promotion during their June 22 game against the DuPage Drones would feature a 50/50 drawing for a choice of several guns. The promotion drew attention and anger from a number of fans in the local community, given the short amount of time between the giveaway and the mass murder of 49 people at Pulse nightclub in Orlando. The team's owner and General Manager, Todd Miller, told local media outlets that he gave thought to cancelling the giveaway, planned well in advance of the terrorist act, but instead chose to go forward with the promotion. Miller and the owner of the gun store providing the firearms emphasized that the weapons would not be at the stadium during the giveaway and that the winner would still have to comply with all applicable laws for purchasing a gun, in order to claim their prize. The game saw triple the number of fans in attendance than a typical game that season. The team has since given away two more guns at its games.

== Former players in professional baseball ==
Since joining the Prospect League for the 2009 season, the Sliders have seen several players drafted by MLB teams. Elliot Soto was selected in the 2010 MLB draft by the Chicago Cubs and made his MLB debut in 2020 with the Los Angeles Angels. Most recently, Chatham, Illinois (just south of Springfield) native Nick Maton was selected in the 2017 MLB draft by the Philadelphia Phillies in the 7th round and made his MLB debut with the Phillies in 2021.

== Seasons ==
Season	Manager	Record	Win %	League	Division	GB	Post-season record	Post-season win %	Post-season result	Notes
2008	Ryan Sawyers	30–17	.638	1st	1st	–	2–1	.667	Won Central Illinois Collegiate League Championship (Danville)	
2009	Jack Clark	22–32	.407	11th	5th	13.0	0–0	.000	Did not qualify	
2010	Curt Ford	35–19	.648	1st	1st	–	0–1	.000	Did not qualify	
2011	Danny Cox	25–30	.455	6th	6th	12.5	0–0	.000	Did not qualify	
2012	Pete Romero	24–36	.400	5th	5th	14.0	0–0	.000	Did not qualify	
2013	Pete Romero	11–47	.190	5th	5th	29.0	0–0	.000	Did not qualify	
2014	Pete Romero / Vic Aure	14–46	.233	5th	5th	25.5	0–0	.000	Did not qualify	
2015	Casey Dill	29–30	.492	4th	4th	13.5	0–0	.000	Did not qualify	
2016	Zac Charbonneau	39–20	.661	1st	1st	–	0–2	.000	Did not qualify	
2017	Randy Guite	26–34	.433	5th	5th	10.0	0–0	.000	Did not qualify	
2018	Steve Leonetti	28–30	.483	7th	4th	7.0	0–0	.000	Did not qualify	
2019	Jeremiah Knackstedt	12–48	.200	12th	6th	31.0	0–0	.000	Did not qualify	Prospect League record 26 game losing streak; League record 48 overall losses
2020	Season cancelled (COVID-19 pandemic)									
2021	Terry McDevitt	30–30	.500	7th	3rd	11.5	0–0	.000	Did not qualify	Last season as the Sliders
2022	Zach George	27–33	.450	11th	3rd	3.0	0–1	.000	Lost Prairie Land Division Championship (Alton)	First season as the Lucky Horseshoes
2023	Zach George	25–29	.463	12th	3rd	7.0	1–1	.500	Won Wabash River Division Championship (Danville); Lost Eastern Conference Championship (Chillicothe)	Moved from Western to Eastern Conference
2024	Brad Gyorkos	24–31	.436	15th	3rd	10.5	0–0	.000	Did not qualify	Moved from Eastern to Western Conference
2025	Pete Romero	13–38	.255	18th	5th	21.0	0–0	.000	Did not qualify	Moved from Western to Eastern Conference
2026	Brad Gyorkos	21–33	.389	17th	4th	10.0	0–0	.000	Did not qualify	
Totals		435–583	.427				3–6	.333		

== Stadium ==
The Lucky Horseshoes play at Robin Roberts Stadium. The stadium opened in 1928 and was renovated/expanded over the years to its current 5,200 seat capacity. During the 2017 season, 29,532 fans attended Sliders games at Robin Roberts stadium, ranking the facility as the fourth-most visited stadium in the Prospect League. The stadium has been the home to a number of minor league and independent teams since it opened in 1928. During the 2019 season, just under 28,000 fans attended Sliders games at the stadium, ranking the facility as the third-most visited stadium in the Prospect League, despite the team's on-field performance, which saw it set a new league record for most losses in a season at 48.

== Roster ==
Springfield Lucky Horseshoes roster
Active roster	Coaching staff
Pitchers: -- Brock Bullinger; 13 Cash Clementi; 7 Russell Copous; -- Alex Corzo; -- Travis Dudycha; 11 Tadeáš Kalcev; 0 Jacob King; 8 Logan Miller; -- Arata Motohashi; 26 Tristan Neely; 12 Knox Poston; 9 Anthony Ribes; 21 Cobe Ross; -- Liam Shackleton; 34 Richie Snider; 25 Hayden Steelman; 22 Nick Sullivan; Catchers: 24 Lawson Alwan; 20 Marco Lopez; -- Zach White; Infielders: 17 Trey Blanchette; 15 Ethan Burkhardt; 19 Jacob Buysse; 4 Micah Dean; 6 Dylan England; 27 Jameson Johnson; 3 AJ Keely; 5 Kannon Kirk; 2 Brandon Valentin; Outfielders: 18 Ryan Dabe; 1 Adrian Nina; 23 Griffin Novacek; 10 General Schofield; 14 Garrett Wiethorn	Manager: -- Brad Gyorkos; Coaches: -- Jimmy Koza (assistant); Disabled list; ‡ Inactive list; § Suspended list; updated June 5, 2026
