= 2026 Prospect League season =

17th annual season of the Prospect League

- League: Prospect League
- Sport: Baseball
- Duration: May 26 – August 1 (Playoffs: August 2 – August 9)
- Games: 56 (560 games in total)
- Teams: 20

Northeast Division
- League champions: Lafayette Aviators

Central Division
- League champions: Terre Haute Rex

Northwest Division
- League champions: Quincy Doggy Paddlers

South Division
- League champions: Cape Catfish

Prospect League Championship
- Champions: Cape Catfish
- Runners-up: Terre Haute Rex
- Finals MVP: Nate Dorinsky

Seasons
- ← 2025 2027 →

The 2026 Prospect League season is the 17th season of collegiate summer baseball in the Prospect League, a collegiate summer baseball league in the Midwestern United States, since its creation in June 2009. There are 20 Prospect League teams, split evenly between Eastern and Western Conferences. These conferences are then split up between the Northeast, Central, Northwest, and South divisions.

The Cape Catfish entered the season as defending champions, having defeated the Lafayette Aviators, two games to zero, in the league's 2025 championship series.

== Season schedule ==
It was announced during the offseason that the city of Kokomo, Indiana would once again have a team in the league after previously being the host city for the Kokomo Jackrabbits from 2014 to 2024. The Jackrabbits were a Prospect League franchise from 2014 to 2018, then a Northwoods League franchise from 2019 to 2024. The Jackrabbits dissolved due to a legal battle between the city of Kokomo and the ownership of the Jackrabbits, Kokomo Baseball LLC, which ultimately ended with a judge ruling in favor of the city of Kokomo. The ruling officially brought an end to the Jackrabbits. Shortly after, the city of Kokomo announced the name of their new team in the Prospect League was the Creek Chubs.

Also, it would later be announced during the offseason that Decatur, Illinois would be granted a team in the league. It will be the first summer baseball team to play in Decatur since the Decatur Commodores, who were a professional Class A minor league affiliate that played in the Midwest League and the Decatur Blues who played in the Central Illinois Collegiate League (CICL), the predecessor to the Prospect League. After months of anticipation, it would be announced that the name of the team would be the Bean Ballers.

The 20 teams in the league are split evenly between two conferences, Eastern and Western. These two conferences are then split up into four divisions: Northeast, Central, Northwest, and South.

The season will be played with a 56-game schedule, which is split between two halves, with the first half ending on June 26 and the second half ending on August 1. The first-half winners in each division will host the second-half winners in a one-game divisional championship round. If the same team wins both halves, the team with the next-best second-half record makes the playoffs.

== Regular season standings ==
=== First half standings ===
==== Eastern Conference ====
Northeast Division Regular Season Standings
Pos	Team	G	W	L	Pct.	GB
1	x – Lafayette Aviators	26	17	9	.654	--
2	Johnstown Mill Rats	26	15	11	.577	2.0
3	Kokomo Creek Chubs	27	13	14	.481	4.5
4	Champion City Half Trax	27	13	14	.481	4.5
5	y – Chillicothe Paints	27	12	15	.444	5.5

Central Division Regular Season Standings
Pos	Team	G	W	L	Pct.	GB
1	x – Dubois County Bombers	27	17	10	.630	--
2	Danville Dans	25	15	10	.600	1.0
3	Springfield Lucky Horseshoes	25	11	14	.440	5.0
4	y – Terre Haute Rex	25	10	15	.400	6.0
5	Decatur Bean Ballers	24	9	15	.375	6.5

==== Western Conference ====
Northwest Division Regular Season Standings
Pos	Team	G	W	L	Pct.	GB
1	x – Quincy Doggy Paddlers	27	16	11	.593	--
2	Clinton LumberKings	24	14	10	.583	0.5
3	Normal CornBelters	26	15	11	.577	0.5
4	y – Burlington Bees	25	11	14	.440	4.0
5	Illinois Valley Pistol Shrimp	25	8	17	.320	7.0

South Division Regular Season Standings
Pos	Team	G	W	L	Pct.	GB
1	x – Cape Catfish	26	19	7	.731	--
2	Jackson Rockabillys	27	16	11	.593	3.5
3	y – O'Fallon Hoots	26	15	11	.577	4.0
4	Thrillville Thrillbillies	27	11	16	.407	8.5
5	Alton River Dragons	26	2	24	.077	17.0

=== Second half standings ===
==== Eastern Conference ====
Northeast Division Regular Season Standings
Pos	Team	G	W	L	Pct.	GB
1	y – Chillicothe Paints	29	18	11	.621	--
2	Kokomo Creek Chubs	28	15	13	.536	2.5
3	Champion City Half Trax	28	14	14	.500	3.5
4	Johnstown Mill Rats	26	12	14	.462	4.5
5	x – Lafayette Aviators	29	12	17	.414	6.0

Central Division Regular Season Standings
Pos	Team	G	W	L	Pct.	GB
1	y – Terre Haute Rex	30	18	12	.600	--
2	Danville Dans	29	16	13	.552	1.5
3	Springfield Lucky Horseshoes	29	10	19	.345	7.5
4	x – Dubois County Bombers	29	9	20	.310	8.5
5	Decatur Bean Ballers	29	9	20	.310	8.5

==== Western Conference ====
Northwest Division Regular Season Standings
Pos	Team	G	W	L	Pct.	GB
1	y – Burlington Bees	31	23	8	.742	--
2	Clinton LumberKings	26	18	8	.692	2.5
3	Normal CornBelters	29	18	11	.621	4.0
4	x – Quincy Doggy Paddlers	28	10	18	.357	11.5
5	Illinois Valley Pistol Shrimp	29	7	22	.241	15.0

South Division Regular Season Standings
Pos	Team	G	W	L	Pct.	GB
1	x – Cape Catfish	29	26	3	.897	--
2	y – O'Fallon Hoots	29	19	10	.655	7.0
3	Jackson Rockabillys	28	15	13	.536	10.5
4	Thrillville Thrillbillies	28	12	16	.429	13.5
5	Alton River Dragons	29	5	24	.172	21.0

=== Full season standings ===
==== Eastern Conference ====
Northeast Division Regular Season Standings
Pos	Team	G	W	L	Pct.	GB
1	y – Chillicothe Paints	56	30	26	.536	--
2	x – Lafayette Aviators	55	29	26	.527	0.5
3	Johnstown Mill Rats	52	27	25	.519	1.0
4	Kokomo Creek Chubs	55	28	27	.509	1.5
5	Champion City Half Trax	55	27	28	.491	2.5

Central Division Regular Season Standings
Pos	Team	G	W	L	Pct.	GB
1	Danville Dans	54	31	23	.574	--
2	y – Terre Haute Rex	55	28	27	.509	3.5
3	x – Dubois County Bombers	56	26	30	.464	6.0
4	Springfield Lucky Horseshoes	54	21	33	.389	10.0
5	Decatur Bean Ballers	53	18	35	.340	12.5

==== Western Conference ====
Northwest Division Regular Season Standings
Pos	Team	G	W	L	Pct.	GB
1	Clinton LumberKings	50	32	18	.640	--
2	y – Burlington Bees	56	34	22	.607	1.0
3	Normal CornBelters	55	33	22	.600	1.5
4	x – Quincy Doggy Paddlers	55	26	29	.473	8.5
5	Illinois Valley Pistol Shrimp	54	15	39	.278	19.0

South Division Regular Season Standings
Pos	Team	G	W	L	Pct.	GB
1	x – Cape Catfish	55	45	10	.818	--
2	y – O'Fallon Hoots	55	34	21	.618	11.0
3	Jackson Rockabillys	55	31	24	.564	14.0
4	Thrillville Thrillbillies	55	23	32	.418	22.0
5	Alton River Dragons	55	7	48	.127	38.0

- x – First Half Winner, clinched playoff spot
- y – Second Half Winner, clinched playoff spot

== Statistical leaders ==
=== Hitting ===
Stat	Player	Team	Total
HR	Wally Diaz	Terre Haute Rex	18
AVG	Collin Senkpeil	Cape Catfish	.432
RBIs	Nick Bonczkowski	O'Fallon Hoots	70
SB	Jaylen Ziegler	Clinton LumberKings	42

=== Pitching ===
Stat	Player	Team	Total
W	Kasey Clark	Clinton LumberKings	6
ERA	Klayton Wright	Thrillville Thrillbillies	4.47
SO	Cooper Pumphrey	Danville Dans	64
SV	Mason Lee, Andrew Theiss, and Dante Onorato	O'Fallon Hoots, Clinton LumberKings, and Jackson Rockabillys	5

== Awards ==
=== All-star selections ===
==== Eastern Conference ====
Hitters
Position	Player	Team
C	John DiGregorio	Bombers
C	Lawson Alwan	Lucky Horseshoes
IF	Jackson Snitko	Bean Ballers
IF	Wally Diaz	Rex
IF	Justin Gorski	Paints
IF	Joseph Gutierrez	Rex
IF	Cam Gravelle	Paints
IF	Gavin Smith	Aviators
IF	Ty Marsh	Mill Rats
IF	Gabe Boyd	Aviators
OF	Carter Murphy	Rex
OF	Will Burke	Dans
OF	Brayden Giesler	Bombers
OF	Austin Lafferty	Mill Rats
OF	Bo Caraway Jr.	Aviators
OF	Samuel Meyer	Paints
DH	Hudson Allen	Bombers
DH	Griffin Novacek	Lucky Horseshoes

Pitchers
Player	Team
Hunter Richardson	Half Trax
Nathan Trimble	Bean Ballers
Talan Meyers	Aviators
Koen Berry	Creek Chubs
Sam McArthur	Dans
Cobe Ross	Lucky Horseshoes
Drake Hoffa	Dans
Luke Holbrook	Bombers
Breyllin Suriel	Rex
Owen Norris	Aviators
Nolan Decker	Creek Chubs
Caleb Boff	Half Trax

==== Western Conference ====
Hitters
Position	Player	Team
C	Nolan McCrossin	CornBelters
C	Brodie Short	Doggy Paddlers
IF	Ethan Wielt	River Dragons
IF	Jackson Stanek	CornBelters
IF	Lucas Krebs	Bees
IF	Nick Griffith	Doggy Paddlers
IF	David Kessler	Catfish
IF	Samuel Paule	Hoots
IF	Gavin Awbrey	LumberKings
IF	Ean Czech	Doggy Paddlers
OF	Hayden Nazarenus	Catfish
OF	Zavier Hatfield	Rockabillys
OF	Tyler Thompson	CornBelters
OF	Nick Bonczkowski	Hoots
OF	Fredrick Ragsdale III	Thrillbillies
OF	Hayden Ralls	Thrillbillies
DH	Brandon Gour	River Dragons
DH	Collin Senkpeil	Catfish

Pitchers
Player	Team
Jake Weissenberger	Bees
Noah Johnson	Catfish
Dante Onorato	Rockabillys
Klayton Wright	Thrillbillies
Jonah Roper	CornBelters
Keegan Luxem	LumberKings
Cole Cates	Rockabillys
Graham Kasey	CornBelters
Riley Fuller	Bees
Jake Collier	Hoots
Max Bryant	Pistol Shrimp
Drew Politte	Hoots

=== End of year awards ===
Award	Player	Team
Most Valuable Player		
Pro Prospect of the Year	Collin Senkpeil	Catfish
Pitcher of the Year		
Relief Pitcher of the Year	Breyllin Suriel	Rex
Manager of the Year	Colin Butkiewicz	Catfish
Social Media of the Year	N/A	
Broadcaster of the Year		
Ballpark Experience of the Year		
General Manager of the Year		
Organization of the Year	N/A	
Staff of the Year	N/A	

== Playoffs ==
=== Format ===
The playoffs will begin with four winner-take-all division championships, followed by two winner-take-all conference championships, and will conclude with a best-of-three league championship series. The playoffs are tentatively slated to begin on August 2 and conclude on August 9.

=== Playoff bracket ===
Division Championship Round
Lafayette Aviators	11
Chillicothe Paints	4
↑ Northeast / ↓ Central
Dubois County Bombers	4
Terre Haute Rex	9
↑ Eastern / ↓ Western
Quincy Doggy Paddlers	10
Burlington Bees	6
↑ Northwest / ↓ South
Cape Catfish	17
O'Fallon Hoots	7

Conference Championship Round
Lafayette Aviators	5
Terre Haute Rex	11
Quincy Doggy Paddlers	5
Cape Catfish	8

Prospect League Championship Series (best-of-three)
Terre Haute Rex	6	10	5
Cape Catfish	7	9	6

== See also ==
- 2026 Appalachian League season
- 2026 FCBL season
- 2026 Major League Baseball season
- 2026 Northwoods League season
- 2026 PGCBL season
