= Chillicothe Paints =

Collegiate summer baseball team in Ohio, US

- Logo

Information
- League: Prospect League (2009–present) (Eastern Conference – Northeast Division)
- Location: Chillicothe, Ohio
- Ballpark: V.A. Memorial Stadium
- Founded: 1993
- League championships: 4 (2010, 2019, 2022, 2023)
- Division championships: 14 (1996, 1998, 1999, 2001, 2005, 2006, 2009, 2010, 2014, 2019, 2022, 2023, 2024, 2026)
- Former league: Frontier League (1993–2008)
- Colors: Navy, red, white, gray, gold
- Ownership: Paints Sports & Entertainment
- General manager: Bryan Wickline
- Manager: Colin Clark
- Media: Chillicothe Gazette
- Website: chillicothepaints.com

The Chillicothe Paints are a collegiate summer baseball team based in Chillicothe, Ohio, in the United States. The team is a member of the summer collegiate Prospect League. The Paints previously played in the professional independent Frontier League from 1993 to 2008. The Paints play their home games at V.A. Memorial Stadium in Chillicothe.

The Paints play in the Prospect League's Eastern Conference – Northeast Division along with the Champion City Half Trax, Johnstown Mill Rats, Kokomo Creek Chubs, and Lafayette Aviators.

== Frontier League era ==
The Chillicothe Paints were one of the eight original franchises to begin Frontier League play in 1993. Two teams, the West Virginia Coal Sox and the Tri-State Tomahawks, did not complete the season as the league struggled with stability. In 1994, the Paints featured Brian Tollberg who went 7–4, 2.48 ERA, and was then signed by the Milwaukee Brewers organization. Tollberg would become the first Frontier League alumnus to make the majors when he started for the San Diego Padres on June 7, 2000, pitching 7 innings in a 3-1 Padres victory.

The league solidified and the Paints found their footing by 1996 when Chillicothe dominated the league with a 48-26 (.649) record, advancing to the Frontier League championship, losing to the Springfield Capitals 3–0 in the best of five series. This was the first of six championship series appearances for the Paints during the Frontier League era, none of which resulted in a championship. The 1996 Paints were led by a trio of power bats in Scott Pinoni (.384 BA, 11 HR, 65 RBI), Jackie Jempsen (.340 BA, 13 HR, 57 RBI) and Mitch House (.305 BA, 18 HR, 53 RBI).

Manager Roger Hanners had the team in the championship series again in both 1998 and 1999, dropping the 1998 series to Springfield 2-1 and the 1999 title series to the London Werewolves 2–0 in a best of three. The Paints were led at this time by the stellar hitting of Gator McBride, a former Atlanta Braves farmhand, who came to Chillicothe and would finish his Frontier League career with a .423 BA, .758 slugging percentage, 27 homers, and 111 RBI. The Boston Red Sox took notice of his resurrected career and signed him after 39 games of the 1999 season. His career was cut short by injuries sustained in an automobile accident in February 2000, forcing him into retirement.

The Paints returned to the Frontier League championship in 2001 with a division-winning 51-31 (.607) record, but were upset by the Richmond Roosters 2–0 in the series. Rick Blanc (13-1, 3.24 ERA), Matt McKay (.345 BA, 1 HR, 48 RBI), Darin Kinsolving (.327 BA, 10 HR, 62 RBI) and Joe Colameco (.325 BA, 10 HR, 60 RBI) paced the balanced Chillicothe squad.

Former major-leaguer Glenn Wilson took over as manager in 2005 and took the Paints to back-to-back championship appearances, dropping the 2005 series 3–2 to the Kalamazoo Kings and the 2006 series 3–0 to the Evansville Otters. John Martinez (16-4, 3.11 ERA), Jose Rodriguez (.380 BA, 5 HR, 36 RBI), and John Ramistella (.317 BA, 20 HR, 73 RBI) led the 2005 Paints, while Kurt Hartfelder (10-5, 16.7 ERA) and Travis Garcia (.289 BA, 11 HR, 66 RBI) led the 2006 team. VA Memorial Stadium had grass from 1993 to 2005, but the ballpark installed FieldTurf in 2006, the first baseball field in the United States to have a 100% FieldTurf playing surface, including base, mound and home plate areas.

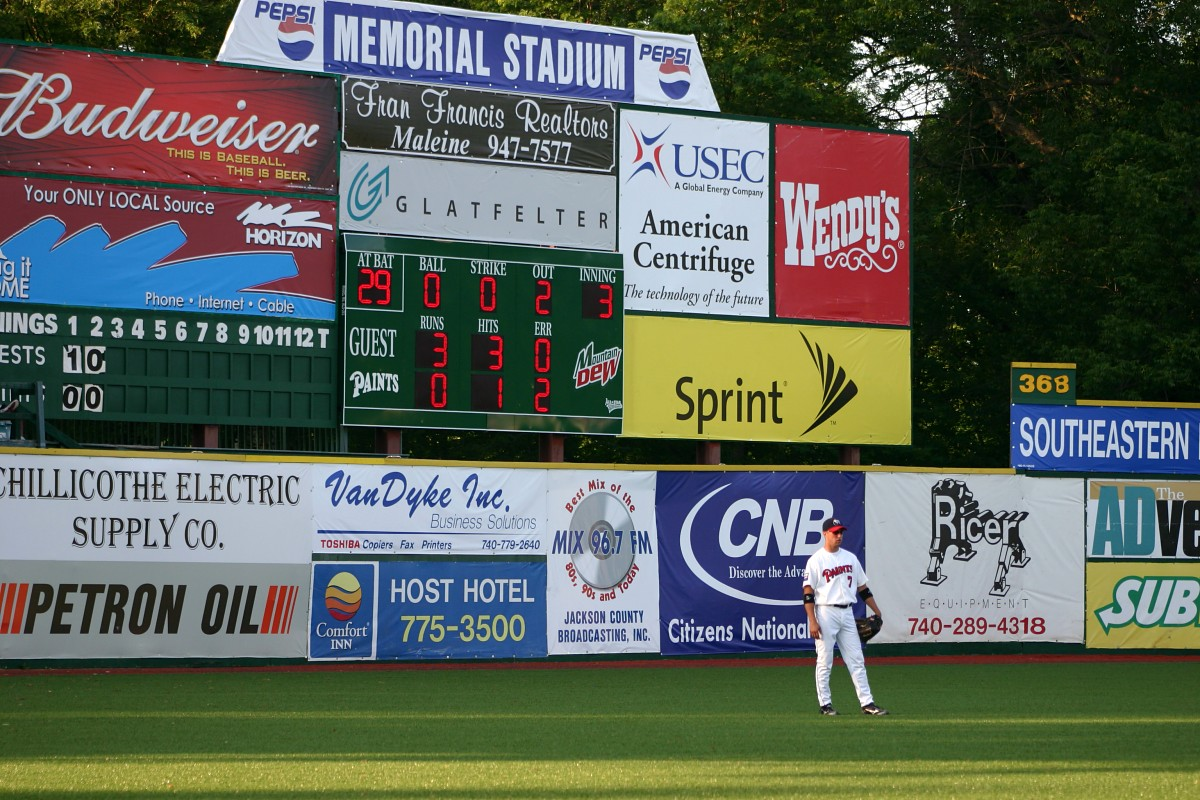
Paints outfielder in front of the VA Memorial Stadium scoreboard in 2006

The Frontier League had changed from predominately rural and smaller towns into a suburban league over the years, and the Paints faced financial and attendance challenges as a result. Following the 2008 season, the ownership announced that they would leave the Frontier League, becoming an amateur collegiate summer baseball team. The Paints were the longest tenured franchise in the Frontier League in 2008 and the last remaining original Frontier League team in the league.

The Paints are represented in the Frontier League Hall of Fame by owner Dr. Chris Hanners, 1B Scott Pinoni, infielder Mitch House, OF Willie Edwards, pitcher Bobby Chandler, OF Gator McBride, 1B/OF Darin Kinsolving, OF Perry Cunningham, and 3B Travis Garcia.

== Prospect League era ==
Since 2009, the Chillicothe Paints have competed in the Prospect League, an amateur collegiate summer league. In 2010, the Paints won their first Prospect League championship against the Danville Dans on an 11th inning walk off home run by Ian Nielsen. The 2010 Paints were led by OF Jeff Holm (.359 BA, 11 HR, 60 RBI), pitcher Blake Mascarello (7-1, 2.86 ERA) and closer Kyle Lindquist (4-1, 10 saves, 2.86 ERA).

The Paints celebrated their 25th season in 2017. As part of the festivities, the Paints retired longtime coach Marty Dunn's number 25 in a pregame ceremony that included former players and staff throughout the first 24 seasons of Paints baseball. That season, the Paints averaged 1,959 fans per game, setting a franchise record in both average attendance and total attendance. The 58,755 total attendance marked a new Prospect League record. The Paints ranked in the top 10 of all summer collegiate teams nationwide in per-game attendance in 2017.

After missing the playoffs in 2016 and 2017, Chillicothe made a return to the playoffs in 2018, losing to the Kokomo Jackrabbits two games to one in the East Division Championship Series. It was the first playoff appearance for manager Brian Bigam since he took over the reins in 2016. Jack Raines was named the Prospect League's Galen Woods Fireman of the Year (Reliever of the Year).

The Paints began the 2019 season 2–7, but went 41-14 the rest of the campaign (including 3–1 in the playoffs) and defeated the Danville Dans in a one-game East Division Championship Game and then, after losing game one of the Prospect League Championship Series at home to the league's newest team, the Cape Catfish, the Paints won games two and three in Cape Girardeau, Mo., to capture the franchise's second league title. Trailing 2–1 in the middle of the game, Trey Smith hit a grand slam to put Chillicothe in the lead 5–2, the eventual final score. Closer Nate Haugh was named the Prospect League's Galen Woods Fireman of the Year (Reliever of the Year) and the team was paced by C Cole Andrews (.320 BA, 11 HR, 61 RBI) and pitcher Austin Calopietro (6-1, 2.47 ERA). For the first time in team history, the Paints averaged at least 2,000 fans per game (2,037) and totaled 57,040 for the season, leading the league and ranking 15th nationally in both categories among similar type teams nationwide.

== Retired numbers ==
- 20 - OF Gator McBride (All-Star and hit leader)
- 22 - P Brian Tollberg (first Frontier League player to make it to the MLB with the San Diego Padres)
- 24 - SS Travis O. Garcia (2007 FL Most Valuable Player)
- 25 - Bench Coach Martin Dunn (Paints' Bench Coach from 1993 to 2015)
- 27 - 3B Mitch House (3-time All-Star)
- 29 - OF Steve Martin (died during the 2006 season)
- 30 - DH/1B Scott Pinoni (1999 Most Valuable Player; 3-time All-Star)
- 50 - Manager Roger Hanners (1993 FL Manager of the Year, managed Paints 1993–2000)

== Major Leaguers ==
- P Brian Tollberg (Pitched for the San Diego Padres from 2000 to 2003)
- P A.J. Achter (Pitched for the Angels and Twins from 2014 to 2016; Pitched for the Paints in 2009)
- 3B Mike Cervenak (Played 10 games for the Philadelphia Phillies in 2008; Spent 13 seasons in the minor leagues; played for the Paints in 1999 & 2000)

== Season-by-season records ==
League champions †	Divisional champions *	Playoff berth ^

Season	League	Conference	Division	Finish	Wins	Losses	Win%	Postseason	Manager
Chillicothe Paints (Frontier League)									
1993	Frontier	N/A	West	2nd	25	27	.481	Did not qualify	Mark Jones/Roger Hanners
1994^	Frontier	N/A	West	1st	33	34	.493	Lost East Division Championship (Lancaster)	Roger Hanners
1995	Frontier	N/A	N/A	8th	21	48	.304	Did not qualify	Roger Hanners
1996*	Frontier	N/A	East	1st	48	26	.649	Won East Division Championship (Johnstown); Lost Frontier League Championship (Springfield)	Roger Hanners
1997	Frontier	N/A	East	3rd	41	38	.519	Did not qualify	Roger Hanners
1998*	Frontier	N/A	East	1st	48	31	.608	Won East Division Championship (Canton); Lost Frontier League Championship (Springfield)	Roger Hanners
1999*	Frontier	N/A	East	2nd	45	38	.542	Won East Division Championship (Evansville); Lost Frontier League Championship (London)	Roger Hanners
2000	Frontier	N/A	East	3rd	42	40	.512	Did not qualify	Roger Hanners
2001*	Frontier	N/A	East	1st	51	33	.607	Won East Division Championship (Canton); Lost Frontier League Championship (Richmond)	Jamie Keefe
2002	Frontier	N/A	East	5th	35	49	.417	Did not qualify	Jamie Keefe
2003^	Frontier	N/A	East	1st	54	31	.635	Lost East Division Championship (Evansville)	Jamie Keefe
2004	Frontier	N/A	East	4th	48	48	.500	Did not qualify	Jamie Keefe
2005*	Frontier	N/A	East	2nd	53	42	.558	Won East Division Championship (Washington); Lost Frontier League Championship (Kalamazoo)	Glenn Wilson
2006*	Frontier	N/A	East	2nd	58	37	.611	Won East Division Championship (Washington); Lost Frontier League Championship (Evansville)	Glenn Wilson
2007	Frontier	N/A	East	2nd	47	49	.490	Did not qualify	Mark Mason
2008	Frontier	N/A	East	2nd	39	57	.406	Did not qualify	Mark Mason
Chillicothe Paints (Prospect League)									
2009*	Prospect	N/A	East	1st	31	25	.554	Lost Prospect League Championship (Quincy)	Brian Mannino
2010†	Prospect	N/A	East	1st	39	17	.696	Won East Division Championship (West Virginia); Won Prospect League Championship (Danville)	Brian Mannino
2011	Prospect	N/A	East	5th	26	30	.464	Did not qualify	Brian Mannino
2012^	Prospect	N/A	East	2nd	36	24	.600	Lost East Division Championship (West Virginia)	Greg Cypret
2013^	Prospect	N/A	East	2nd	34	26	.567	Lost East Division Championship (West Virginia)	Greg Cypret
2014*	Prospect	N/A	East	1st	40	20	.667	Won East Division Championship (Butler); Lost Prospect League Championship (Quincy)	Greg Cypret
2015^	Prospect	N/A	East	1st	38	22	.633	Lost East Division Championship (West Virginia)	Greg Cypret
2016	Prospect	N/A	East	6th	23	37	.383	Did not qualify	Brian Bigam
2017	Prospect	N/A	East	4th	29	31	.483	Did not qualify	Brian Bigam
2018^	Prospect	N/A	East	2nd	34	26	.558	Lost East Division Championship (Kokomo)	Brian Bigam
2019†	Prospect	N/A	East	1st	43	21	.672	Won East Division Championship (Danville); Won Prospect League Championship (Cape)	Brian Bigam
2020	Prospect	N/A	East	Season cancelled (COVID-19 pandemic)					
2021^	Prospect	Eastern	Ohio River Valley	1st	36	24	.600	Lost Ohio River Valley Division Championship (Champion City)	John Penn
2022†	Prospect	Eastern	Ohio River Valley	1st	38	22	.633	Won Ohio River Valley Division Championship (Johnstown); Won Eastern Conference Championship (Illinois Valley); Won Prospect League Championship (Alton)	Jackson White
2023†	Prospect	Eastern	Ohio River Valley	1st	41	17	.707	Won Ohio River Valley Division Championship (Champion City); Won Eastern Conference Championship (Springfield); Won Prospect League Championship (Quincy)	Michael Boswell
2024*	Prospect	Eastern	Northeast	1st	36	20	.643	Won Northeast Division Championship (Johnstown); Lost Eastern Conference Championship (Terre Haute)	Daryin Lewis
2025	Prospect	Eastern	Northeast	3rd	25	27	.481	Did not qualify	Daryin Lewis
2026^	Prospect	Eastern	Northeast	1st	30	26	.536	Lost Northeast Division Championship (Lafayette)	Colin Clark

== Roster ==
Chillicothe Paints roster
Active roster	Coaching staff
Pitchers: 11 Brady Armstrong; 12 Isaac Bellamy; 23 Trisdon Ciampanella; 21 Grant Cline; 18 Wyatt Colvin; 34 JT Fabian; 17 Brady Fitzpatrick; 33 Karson Frye; 8 Connor Head; 15 Parker Heaney; 16 Hideyoshi Kawahara; 57 Dylan Lloyd; -- Max Mullen; -- Devin Parker; -- Connor Ramsey; 55 Evan Schweizer; 31 Cole Wells; 26 Ashton Wolfe; Catchers: 5 Jude Clough; 9 Michael Simone; 6 Mitchel Szymczak; Infielders: 7 Cameron Birch; 1 Justin Gorski; 3 Cam Gravelle; 2 Carter Hire; 10 Tripp Johns; 28 Tannar Patterson; 36 Mike Schaefer; -- Nick Sellari; Outfielders: 4 Alex Bemis; 32 Brady Groves; 19 Samuel Meyer; 13 Gabe Pitts; 14 Matt Smith	Manager: -- Colin Clark; Coaches: -- Spencer Crane (assistant); -- Jeff Noble (assistant); Disabled list; ‡ Inactive list; § Suspended list; updated June 5, 2026
