= Lloyd Hopkins Field =

Stadium in Illinois, USA

- The Hop
- Location within Illinois Location within the United States
- Interactive map of Lloyd Hopkins Field
- Full name: Lloyd Hopkins Field in Gordon Moore Park
- Address: 98 Arnold Palmer Road; Alton, Illinois
- Coordinates: 38°54′14″N 90°6′29″W
- Owner: City of Alton, Illinois
- Operator: Alton Park and Recreation Department
- Capacity: 2,500

Construction
- Renovated: 2015; 11 years ago

Tenants
- American Legion Baseball 1981–2015, 2020–present Bluff City Bombers (CICL) 1998–2004; Alton River Dragons (PL) 2021–present National Club Baseball Association World Series 2023–present

Lloyd Hopkins Field is a baseball stadium in Alton, Illinois. Owned and operated by the city of Alton, it is the home field for the Alton River Dragons, a collegiate summer baseball team in the Prospect League, and for American Legion Baseball. Hopkins Field hosted American Legion teams from 1981 to 2015, and they returned in 2020. Hopkins Field was also the home of the Bluff City Bombers in the Central Illinois Collegiate League from 1998 to 2004.

In January 2020 the city of Alton signed a 10-year lease with the River Dragons. The deal called for upgrades to Hopkins Field, including the addition of a locker room, batting cages, a new scoreboard and video board, concession amenities, and seating for 1,800 people. Hopkins Field had been renovated in 2015 with updated dugouts and new batting cages, lights, siding, netting, fencing, and turf.
