= Alton River Dragons =

American collegiate baseball team

- Logo

Information
- League: Prospect League (Western Conference – South Division)
- Location: Alton, Illinois
- Ballpark: Lloyd Hopkins Field
- Founded: 2020
- League championships: 0
- Division championships: 1 (2022)
- Colors: Dark green, black, red, light gray, white
- Mascot: Dinger
- Ownership: Steve Marso
- Manager: Andrew Olney
- Website: www.altonbaseball.com

The Alton River Dragons are a collegiate summer baseball team located in Alton, Illinois. They were founded in 2020 and began play in 2021 as members of the Prospect League.

The River Dragons play in the Prospect League's Western Conference – South Division along with the Cape Catfish, Jackson Rockabillys, O'Fallon Hoots, and Thrillville Thrillbillies.

== History ==
On January 29, 2020, the Prospect League of collegiate summer baseball announced that Alton, Illinois had been granted a franchise for the upcoming season. Alton previously hosted a minor league team when the 1917 Alton Blues played as members of the Illinois-Indiana-Iowa League.

The franchise owner was announced as Steve Marso, who had owned previous franchises in summer collegiate baseball. Dallas Martz was hired as the Alton General Manager.

The "River Dragons" moniker was announced for the Alton franchise on August 14, 2020. The name was chosen after a public vote.

On November 12, 2020, the Alton River Dragons announced the hiring of Darrell Handelsman to manage the 2021 Alton team. The Alton franchise had previously hired Brock Moss to manage the first team, but Moss had since accepted a position at Texas A&M International University, making him unavailable to coach Alton in the summer.

During the River Dragons second season in 2022, the team set a Prospect League record with 210 stolen bases.

The River Dragon's Eddie King Jr. from the University of Louisville was named the Mike Schmidt Prospect League Player of the Year. King Jr. led the league with 15 home runs and stole 31 bases in 2022.

Blake Burris set a new Prospect League record with 47 stolen bases and was the league batting champion, batting .361 for the season.

On September 21, 2022, it was announced that Darrell Handelsman was stepping down as Head Coach. On October 5, 2022, the River Dragons announced the hiring of Richard "Scotty" Scott as the team's next Head Coach.

After going 15-29 Head Coach Scotty Scott was replaced by River Dragons General Manager Dallas Martz to finish out the 2023 season. Under Martz's watch the River Dragons finished the season 5–7.

Steve Maddock of Frisco, TX was named the River Dragons 2024 Head Coach. However on December 13, 2023, Maddock stepped down as Head Coach.

== Stadium ==
The Alton River Dragons play at Lloyd Hopkins Field in Gordon Moore Park. Renovations were discussed for the ballpark in anticipation of the 2021 season. The ballpark had previously hosted the Bluff City Bombers of the Central Illinois Collegiate League. The ballpark is located at 98 Arnold Palmer Road, Cottage Hills, Illinois, 62018.

== Seasons ==
Season	Manager	Record	Win %	League	Division	GB	Post-season record	Post-season win %	Post-season result	Notes
2021	Darrell Handelsman	27–32	.458	11th	4th	10.5	0–0	.000	Did not qualify	Inaugural season
2022	Darrell Handelsman	32–28	.533	4th	1st	–	3–2	.600	Won Prairie Land Division Championship (Springfield); Won Western Conference Championship (Quincy); Lost Prospect League Championship (Chillicothe)	
2023	Richard Scott / Dallas Martz	20–35	.364	16th	4th	18.0	0–0	.000	Did not qualify	
2024	Noah Suarez	24–29	.453	14th	5th	8.0	0–0	.000	Did not qualify	
2025	Jarrod Brissenden	25–30	.455	11th	4th	15.5	0–0	.000	Did not qualify	
2026	Jarrod Brissenden / Andrew Olney	7–48	.127	20th	5th	38.0	0–0	.000	Did not qualify	(Note: River Dragons began the season 2-20 before Brissenden was fired. Olney served as manager for the rest of the season.)
Totals		135–202	.401				3–2	.600		

== Roster ==
Alton River Dragons roster
Active roster	Coaching staff
Pitchers: 13 Landon Albers; 43 Michael Barker; -- Wes Carter; 15 Braxdon Decker; 16 Joe Falkowski; 12 Keaton Favre; 5 Diego Johnson; 17 Griffin Kelly; 6 Austin Rathgeb; 46 Luke Richard; 10 Darren Rosenberg; 41 Shinnosuke Sanada; 32 Jack Schoentag; 18 Lucas Valencia; 11 Chase Wells; 2 Hayden Wilson; 22 Brandon Wise; Catchers: 1 Sean McConachie; 0 Caynen Patterson; 28 Walker Robey; 44 Logan Studer; Infielders: 8 Charlie Berry; 3 Kaedin Bond; 4 Brandon Gour; 38 Landon Harwell; 24 Cole Hockman; 20 Kannon Kamp; 36 Ryan Kondrad; 37 Miles Nelson; 23 Charlie Renco; 39 Florent Riep; -- Nick Ryun; 40 Ethan Wielt; Outfielders: -- Kyle Byrne; 14 Ryan Hartz; 9 Adam Moser; 35 Jake Ottensmeier	Manager: -- Andrew Olney; Coaches: -- Blake Vandiver (hitting); Disabled list; ‡ Inactive list; § Suspended list; updated June 14, 2026
