= Illinois Valley Pistol Shrimp =

US collegiate summer baseball league team

- Logo

Information
- League: Prospect League (Western Conference – Northwest Division)
- Location: Peru, Illinois
- Ballpark: Veterans Memorial Park (capacity: 575+)
- Founded: 2019; 7 years ago
- League championships: 1 (2024)
- Division championships: 2 (2022, 2024)
- Colors: Orange, black, white, dark orange, tan
- Ownership: John Jakiemiec
- General manager: June Keeley
- Manager: John Jakiemiec
- Website: Illinois Valley Pistol Shrimp

The Illinois Valley Pistol Shrimp are a collegiate summer league baseball team in the Prospect League. They play at Veterans Memorial Park in Peru, Illinois, United States. The Pistol Shrimp formed in Lisle, Illinois, in late 2018 as an expansion franchise for the 2019 season, under the name DuPage Pistol Shrimp. They and other collegiate summer leagues and teams exist to give top college players professional-like experience without affecting NCAA eligibility.

DuPage County's previous team in the Prospect League, the DuPage Drones, suspended operations after the 2017 season, leaving the city without a team for the 2018 season. After a division championship appearance in 2019 and a cancelled season in 2020 due to the COVID-19 pandemic, the Pistol Shrimp relocated to Peru, Illinois for the 2021 season, citing possible attendance limitations in DuPage County related to the pandemic. Shortly after the conclusion of the 2021 season, the Pistol Shrimp confirmed they'd return to the Illinois Valley for the 2022 season.

The Pistol Shrimp play in the Prospect League's Western Conference – Northwest Division along with the Burlington Bees, Clinton LumberKings, Normal CornBelters, and Quincy Doggy Paddlers.

== Seasons ==
Season	Manager	Record	Win %	League	Division	GB	Postseason record	Postseason win %	Postseason result	Notes
2019	John Jakiemiec	34–25	.576	5th	2nd	–	0–1	.000	Lost West Division Championship (Cape)	Inaugural season
2020	Season cancelled (COVID-19 pandemic)									
2021	John Jakiemiec	24–36	.400	14th	4th	17.5	0–0	.000	Did not qualify	
2022	John Jakiemiec	38–21	.644	2nd	2nd	3.0	1–1	.500	Won Wabash River Division Championship (Danville); Lost Eastern Conference Championship (Chillicothe)	
2023	John Jakiemiec	27–31	.466	11th	3rd	6.0	0–0	.000	Did not qualify	
2024	John Jakiemiec	35–21	.625	2nd	1st	–	4–0	1.000	Won Northwest Division Championship (Clinton); Won Western Conference Championship (Thrillville); Won Prospect League Championship (Terre Haute)	
2025	John Jakiemiec	31–23	.574	7th	3rd	3.5	0–0	.000	Did not qualify	
2026	John Jakiemiec	15–39	.278	19th	5th	19.0	0–0	.000	Did not qualify	
Totals		204–196	.510				5–2	.714		

== Roster ==
Illinois Valley Pistol Shrimp roster
Active roster	Coaching staff
Pitchers: -- Carson Baker; 44 Benjamin Blondino; 47 Phoenix Brant; 17 Max Bryant; 31 Tyler Deleskiewicz; 50 Matt Hannafin; 4 Camden Loomis; 24 Takeru Onozaki; 9 Yamato Onozaki; -- Ronan Owens; 25 Beau Raikes; 45 Joe Richardson; -- Tyler Sabodor; 28 Eddie Scaccia; 21 Brody Schulte; 32 Alan Spencer; 18 Daniel Strohm; 34 Trey Todd; -- Gino Zagorac; 7 Izzaq Zrust; Catchers: 22 Owen Anderson; 14 Justin Szymanski; 39 Nick Weaver; Infielders: 13 Ximi Baftiri; -- Anthony Chavez; 10 Drew Church; 11 Max French; 1 Nolan Galla; -- Joey Ireland; 33 Pambos Nicoloudes; 3 Chase Roberts; Outfielders: 5 Dominic Battista; 16 Chris Danko; 8 Brayden Foster; 20 Dawson Szymanski; -- Jordan Walczykowski	Manager: 36 John Jakiemiec; Coaches: 34 Ryan Eiermann (pitching); 6 Jake Ferguson (assistant); -- Justyn Friday (assistant); -- Mark Sheehan (pitching); Disabled list; ‡ Inactive list; § Suspended list; updated June 5, 2026
