= Danville Stadium =

Baseball stadium in Danville, Illinois

- Interactive map of Danville Stadium
- Location: 610 Highland Blvd. Danville, Illinois 61832; United States
- Coordinates: 40.109593°N 87.631788°W
- Capacity: 5200
- Public transit: DMT

Construction
- Opened: 1946

Tenants
- Baseball; Danville Warriors (MWL) 1970–1976, 1982; Danville Dans (CICL/PL) 1989–present

Danville Stadium is a baseball stadium in Danville, Illinois, located at 610 Highland Boulevard.

Danville Stadium is currently home to the Danville Dans of the collegiate summer Prospect League. The ballpark was formerly home of the Danville Warriors, which was a Class A minor league baseball team in the Midwest League. Originally built in 1946, the park has a capacity of 4,000 people. Selected scenes from the 1992 movie The Babe were filmed here.
