= 2022 Prospect League season =

13th annual season of the Prospect League

- League: Prospect League
- Sport: Baseball
- Duration: June 1 – August 6 (Playoffs: August 7 – August 14)
- Games: 60 (480 games in total)
- Teams: 16

Ohio River Valley Division
- League champions: Chillicothe Paints

Wabash River Division
- League champions: Illinois Valley Pistol Shrimp

Great River Division
- League champions: Quincy Gems

Prairie Land Division
- League champions: Alton River Dragons

Prospect League Championship
- Champions: Chillicothe Paints
- Runners-up: Alton River Dragons

Seasons
- ← 2021 2023 →

The 2022 Prospect League season was the 13th season of collegiate summer baseball in the Prospect League, a collegiate summer baseball league in the Midwestern United States, since its creation in June 2009. There are 16 Prospect League teams, split evenly between Eastern and Western Conferences. These conferences are then split up between the Ohio River Valley, Wabash River, Great River, and Prairie Land divisions.

The Cape Catfish entered the season as defending champions, having defeated the Lafayette Aviators, two games to one, in the league's 2021 championship series.

== Season schedule ==
Very little changed for the 2022 season, with the only difference in the team lineup being an ownership and name change for the Springfield, Ill. franchise as the Sliders became the Lucky Horseshoes. A new franchise for Jackson, Tennessee, was announced, which will take the field beginning with the 2023 season at the former home of the class Double-A Jackson Generals, The Ballpark at Jackson.

The 16 teams in the league are split evenly between two conferences Eastern and Western. These two conferences are then split up into four divisions, Ohio River Valley, Wabash River, Great River, and Prairie Land.

The season will be played with a 60-game schedule, which is split between two halves, with the first-half ending on July 4 and second-half ending on August 6. The first-half winners in each division will host the second-half winners in a one-game divisional championship round. (If the same team wins both halves, the team with the next-best second-half record makes the playoffs).

== Regular season standings ==
=== First half standings ===
==== Eastern Conference ====
Ohio River Valley Division Regular Season Standings
Pos	Team	G	W	L	Pct.	GB
1	x – Chillicothe Paints	31	21	10	.677	--
2	y – Johnstown Mill Rats	31	12	19	.387	9.0
3	West Virginia Miners	29	11	18	.379	9.0
4	Champion City Kings	29	9	20	.310	11.0

Wabash River Division Regular Season Standings
Pos	Team	G	W	L	Pct.	GB
1	x – Danville Dans	30	21	9	.700	--
2	y – Illinois Valley Pistol Shrimp	31	20	11	.645	1.5
3	Terre Haute REX	30	19	11	.633	2.0
4	Lafayette Aviators	30	14	16	.467	7.0

==== Western Conference ====
Great River Division Regular Season Standings
Pos	Team	G	W	L	Pct.	GB
1	x – Quincy Gems	32	19	13	.594	--
2	Clinton LumberKings	31	15	16	.484	3.5
3	y – Normal CornBelters	30	14	16	.467	4.0
4	Burlington Bees	31	11	20	.355	7.5

Prairie Land Division Regular Season Standings
Pos	Team	G	W	L	Pct.	GB
1	x – Alton River Dragons	31	18	13	.581	--
2	O'Fallon Hoots	32	17	15	.531	1.5
3	y – Springfield Lucky Horseshoes	31	12	19	.387	6.0
4	Cape Catfish	31	12	19	.387	6.0

=== Second half standings ===
==== Eastern Conference ====
Ohio River Valley Division Regular Season Standings
Pos	Team	G	W	L	Pct.	GB
1	x – Chillicothe Paints	29	17	12	.586	--
2	y – Johnstown Mill Rats	29	17	12	.586	--
3	Champion City Kings	28	14	14	.500	2.5
4	West Virginia Miners	28	9	19	.321	7.5

Wabash River Division Regular Season Standings
Pos	Team	G	W	L	Pct.	GB
1	x – Danville Dans	27	19	8	.704	--
2	y – Illinois Valley Pistol Shrimp	28	18	10	.643	1.5
3	Terre Haute REX	30	18	12	.600	2.5
4	Lafayette Aviators	29	11	18	.379	9.0

==== Western Conference ====
Great River Division Regular Season Standings
Pos	Team	G	W	L	Pct.	GB
1	y – Normal CornBelters	29	17	12	.586	--
2	Clinton LumberKings	29	13	16	.448	4.0
3	x – Quincy Gems	28	12	16	.429	4.5
4	Burlington Bees	28	9	19	.321	7.5

Prairie Land Division Regular Season Standings
Pos	Team	G	W	L	Pct.	GB
1	y – Springfield Lucky Horseshoes	29	15	14	.517	--
2	Cape Catfish	28	14	14	.500	0.5
3	x – Alton River Dragons	29	14	15	.483	1.0
4	O'Fallon Hoots	28	11	17	.393	3.5

=== Full season standings ===
==== Eastern Conference ====
Ohio River Valley Division Regular Season Standings
Pos	Team	G	W	L	Pct.	GB
1	x – Chillicothe Paints	60	38	22	.633	--
2	y – Johnstown Mill Rats	60	29	31	.483	9.0
3	Champion City Kings	57	23	34	.404	13.5
4	West Virginia Miners	57	20	37	.351	16.5

Wabash River Division Regular Season Standings
Pos	Team	G	W	L	Pct.	GB
1	x – Danville Dans	57	40	17	.702	--
2	y – Illinois Valley Pistol Shrimp	59	38	21	.644	3.0
3	Terre Haute REX	60	37	23	.617	4.5
4	Lafayette Aviators	59	25	34	.424	16.0

==== Western Conference ====
Great River Division Regular Season Standings
Pos	Team	G	W	L	Pct.	GB
1	y – Normal CornBelters	59	31	28	.525	--
2	x – Quincy Gems	60	31	29	.517	0.5
3	Clinton LumberKings	60	28	32	.467	3.5
4	Burlington Bees	59	20	39	.339	11.0

Prairie Land Division Regular Season Standings
Pos	Team	G	W	L	Pct.	GB
1	x – Alton River Dragons	60	32	28	.533	--
2	O'Fallon Hoots	60	28	32	.467	4.0
3	y – Springfield Lucky Horseshoes	60	27	33	.450	5.0
4	Cape Catfish	59	26	33	.441	5.5

- x – First Half Winner, clinched playoff spot
- y – Second Half Winner, clinched playoff spot

== Statistical leaders ==
=== Hitting ===
Stat	Player	Team	Total
HR	Eddie King	Alton River Dragons	15
AVG	Blake Burris	Alton River Dragons	.361
H	Alec Brunson	Terre Haute REX	84
RBIs	Alec Brunson	Terre Haute REX	59
SB	Blake Burris	Alton River Dragons	47

=== Pitching ===
Stat	Player	Team	Total
W	Nick Lallathin, Connor Lockwood	Chillicothe Paints, Champion City Kings	6
ERA	Jake Curtis	Springfield Lucky Horseshoes	2.86
SO	Connor Lockwood	Champion City Kings	73
SV	Garrett McClain	Terre Haute REX	7

== Awards ==
=== All-star selections ===
==== Eastern Conference ====
Hitters
Position	Player	Team
C	Mike Sprockett	Paints
1B	Tucker Bougie	Pistol Shrimp
2B	Carlos Vasquez	Dans
3B	Keenan Taylor	Dans
SS	Drake DiGiorno	Dans
OF	Alec Brunson	Rex
OF	Zach Lane	Pistol Shrimp
OF	Aaron Beck	Rex
DH	Tim Orr	Paints

Pitchers
Position	Player	Team
SP	Josh Leerssen	Dans
SP	Parker Carlson	Dans
SP	Gyeongju Kim	Aviators
RP	Landon Tomkins	Dans
RP	Harrison Bodendorf	Pistol Shrimp
RP	Nick Lallathin	Paints

==== Western Conference ====
Hitters
Position	Player	Team
C	Cade Moss	LumberKings
1B	Zach Stewart	Gems
2B	Danny Sperling	Catfish
3B	Kolton Poorman	Catfish
SS	Jackson Chatterton	CornBelters
OF	Eddie King Jr.	River Dragons
OF	Blake Burris	River Dragons
OF	Patrick Clohisy	Hoots
DH	Kevin Santiago	Bees

Pitchers
Position	Player	Team
SP	Jake Curtis	Lucky Horseshoes
SP	Jackson Kent	LumberKings
SP	Adam Stilts	River Dragons
RP	Colin Bryant	Catfish
RP	Noah Bush	River Dragons
RP	Austin Brock	Catfish

=== End of year awards ===
Award	Player	Team
Most Valuable Player	Eddie King Jr.	Alton River Dragons
Pro Prospect of the Year	Khal Stephen	Danville Dans
Starting Pitcher of the Year	Josh Leerssen	Danville Dans
Relief Pitcher of the Year	Landon Tomkins	Danville Dans
Manager of the Year	Eric Coleman	Danville Dans

== Playoffs ==
=== Format ===
The Divisional Championship Round consists of one winner-take-all game between the winner of the first half in each division and the division's second-half winner (If the same team wins both halves, the team with the next-best second-half record makes the playoffs). Division Championship games will take place August 7.

The winners of the divisional games advance to the Conference Championship Round. Again, this is a one-game, winner-take-all game between the two winners of the division championship games in the Eastern Conference and the two-division championship game-winners in the Western Conference. These games will take place August 9.

The Eastern and Western Conference champions play each other in the best-of-three Prospect League Championship Series. Game one is August 11, hosted by the team with the lesser regular-season record. After a travel day, game two is August 13. If necessary, game three will take place August 14, at the same stadium as game two. The team with the best overall record gets to pick to either host game one or games two and three.

=== Playoff bracket ===
Divisional Championship Round
Chillicothe Paints	16
Johnstown Mill Rats	0
↑ Ohio River Valley / ↓ Wabash River
Danville Dans	10
Illinois Valley Pistol Shrimp	11
↑ Eastern / ↓ Western
Quincy Gems	6
Normal CornBelters	3
↑ Great River / ↓ Prairie Land
Alton River Dragons	4
Springfield Lucky Horseshoes	1

Conference Championship Round
Chillicothe Paints	7
Illinois Valley Pistol Shrimp	4
Quincy Gems	7
Alton River Dragons	8

Prospect League Championship Series (best-of-three)
Chillicothe Paints	5	0	14
Alton River Dragons	3	2	4

== See also ==
- 2022 NCAA Division I baseball season
- 2022 NCAA Division I baseball tournament
- 2022 Men's College World Series
- 2022 NCAA Division III baseball tournament
