= 2024 Prospect League season =

15th annual season of the Prospect League

- League: Prospect League
- Sport: Baseball
- Duration: May 28 – July 31 (Playoffs: August 1 – August 8)
- Games: 60 (540 games in total)
- Teams: 18

Northeast Division
- League champions: Chillicothe Paints

Central Division
- League champions: Terre Haute Rex

Northwest Division
- League champions: Illinois Valley Pistol Shrimp

South Division
- League champions: Thrillville Thrillbillies

Prospect League Championship
- Champions: Illinois Valley Pistol Shrimp
- Runners-up: Terre Haute Rex
- Finals MVP: Jared Herzog

Seasons
- ← 2023 2025 →

The 2024 Prospect League season was the 15th season of collegiate summer baseball in the Prospect League, a collegiate summer baseball league in the Midwestern United States, since its creation in June 2009. There are 18 Prospect League teams, split evenly between Eastern and Western Conferences. These conferences are then split up between the Northeast, Central, Northwest, and South divisions.

The Chillicothe Paints entered the season as two-time defending champions, having defeated the Quincy Gems, two games to one, in the league's 2023 championship series.

== Season schedule ==
Despite reaching the Prospect League Championship in 2023, the Quincy Gems announced that they would no longer play at QU Stadium and would not return for the 2024 season. The Gems would seek relocation for any potential future seasons.

After the Gems announced they would not play in 2024, the league brought in two new teams for the season, the Dubois County Bombers and the Full Count Rhythm. For the Bombers, it would be their second stint in the league with the first one being from 2009 to 2012.

The 18 teams in the league are split evenly between two conferences Eastern and Western. These two conferences are then split up into four divisions, Northeast, Central, Northwest, and South.

The season will be played with a 60-game schedule, which is split between two halves, with the first half ending on June 30 and the second half ending on July 31. The first-half winners in each division will host the second-half winners in a one-game divisional championship round. (If the same team wins both halves, the team with the next-best second-half record makes the playoffs).

== Regular season standings ==
=== First half standings ===
==== Eastern Conference ====
Northeast Division Regular Season Standings
Pos	Team	G	W	L	Pct.	GB
1	x – Chillicothe Paints	29	19	10	.655	--
2	Lafayette Aviators	27	14	13	.519	4.0
3	y – Johnstown Mill Rats	29	13	16	.448	6.0
4	Champion City Kings	29	7	22	.241	12.0

Central Division Regular Season Standings
Pos	Team	G	W	L	Pct.	GB
1	x – Danville Dans	30	17	13	.567	--
2	y – Terre Haute Rex	28	15	13	.536	1.0
3	Normal CornBelters	29	14	15	.483	2.5
4	Full Count Rhythm	28	12	16	.429	4.0
5	Dubois County Bombers	29	12	17	.414	4.5

==== Western Conference ====
Northwest Division Regular Season Standings
Pos	Team	G	W	L	Pct.	GB
1	x – Illinois Valley Pistol Shrimp	26	17	9	.654	--
2	y – Clinton LumberKings	26	15	11	.577	2.0
3	Springfield Lucky Horseshoes	26	8	18	.308	9.0
4	Burlington Bees	29	6	23	.207	12.5

South Division Regular Season Standings
Pos	Team	G	W	L	Pct.	GB
1	x – Thrillville Thrillbillies	27	21	6	.778	--
2	Jackson Rockabillys	27	17	10	.630	4.0
3	O'Fallon Hoots	28	17	11	.607	4.5
4	Alton River Dragons	26	13	13	.500	7.5
5	y – Cape Catfish	29	14	15	.483	8.0

=== Second half standings ===
==== Eastern Conference ====
Northeast Division Regular Season Standings
Pos	Team	G	W	L	Pct.	GB
1	x – Chillicothe Paints	27	17	10	.630	--
2	y – Johnstown Mill Rats	27	13	14	.481	4.0
3	Lafayette Aviators	29	12	17	.414	6.0
4	Champion City Kings	27	11	16	.407	6.0

Central Division Regular Season Standings
Pos	Team	G	W	L	Pct.	GB
1	y – Terre Haute Rex	27	17	10	.630	--
2	Normal CornBelters	26	14	12	.538	2.5
3	x – Danville Dans	26	13	13	.500	3.5
4	Full Count Rhythm	27	13	14	.481	4.0
5	Dubois County Bombers	25	7	18	.280	9.0

==== Western Conference ====
Northwest Division Regular Season Standings
Pos	Team	G	W	L	Pct.	GB
1	y – Clinton LumberKings	29	19	10	.655	--
2	x – Illinois Valley Pistol Shrimp	30	18	12	.600	1.5
3	Springfield Lucky Horseshoes	29	16	13	.552	3.0
4	Burlington Bees	27	11	16	.407	7.0

South Division Regular Season Standings
Pos	Team	G	W	L	Pct.	GB
1	y – Cape Catfish	27	17	10	.630	--
2	Jackson Rockabillys	28	16	12	.571	1.5
3	O'Fallon Hoots	28	12	16	.429	5.5
4	Alton River Dragons	27	11	16	.407	6.0
5	x – Thrillville Thrillbillies	28	10	18	.357	7.5

=== Full season standings ===
==== Eastern Conference ====
Northeast Division Regular Season Standings
Pos	Team	G	W	L	Pct.	GB
1	x – Chillicothe Paints	56	36	20	.643	--
2	Lafayette Aviators	56	26	30	.464	10.0
3	y – Johnstown Mill Rats	56	26	30	.464	10.0
4	Champion City Kings	56	18	38	.321	18.0

Central Division Regular Season Standings
Pos	Team	G	W	L	Pct.	GB
1	y – Terre Haute Rex	55	32	23	.582	--
2	x – Danville Dans	56	30	26	.536	2.5
3	Normal CornBelters	55	28	27	.509	4.0
4	Full Count Rhythm	55	25	30	.455	7.0
5	Dubois County Bombers	54	19	35	.352	12.5

==== Western Conference ====
Northwest Division Regular Season Standings
Pos	Team	G	W	L	Pct.	GB
1	x – Illinois Valley Pistol Shrimp	56	35	21	.625	--
2	y – Clinton LumberKings	55	34	21	.618	0.5
3	Springfield Lucky Horseshoes	55	24	31	.436	10.5
4	Burlington Bees	56	17	39	.304	18.0

South Division Regular Season Standings
Pos	Team	G	W	L	Pct.	GB
1	Jackson Rockabillys	55	33	22	.600	--
2	x – Thrillville Thrillbillies	55	31	24	.564	2.0
3	y – Cape Catfish	56	31	25	.554	2.5
4	O'Fallon Hoots	56	29	27	.518	4.5
5	Alton River Dragons	53	24	29	.453	8.0

- x – First Half Winner, clinched playoff spot
- y – Second Half Winner, clinched playoff spot

== Statistical leaders ==
=== Hitting ===
Stat	Player	Team	Total
HR	Gabe Wright, Shane Lewis	Terre Haute Rex, Lafayette Aviators	9
AVG	Alec Gonzalez	Lafayette Aviators	.400
RBIs	Jaison Andujar	Springfield Lucky Horseshoes	51
SB	Lane Crowden, Jimmy Koza	Cape Catfish, Springfield Lucky Horseshoes	46

=== Pitching ===
Stat	Player	Team	Total
W	Joshua Mauney, Trey Watson	Springfield Lucky Horseshoes, Jackson Rockabillys	6
ERA	Trey Watson	Jackson Rockabillys	3.21
SO	Gunnar Brown	Danville Dans	70
SV	Jaxson Lucas	Jackson Rockabillys	13

== Awards ==
=== All-star selections ===
==== Eastern Conference ====
Hitters
Position	Player	Team
C	Cole Raile	Paints
1B	Landen Johnson	CornBelters
2B	Jhors Gomez	Paints
3B	Dom Krupinski	Mill Rats
3B	Felix Polanco	Paints
SS	Nomar Garcia	Rex
OF	Eric Colaco	Paints
OF	Mikey Scott	Aviators
OF	Gabe Wright	Rex
UT	Tyler Castro	CornBelters
DH	Graham Mastros	Dans

Pitchers
Position	Player	Team
SP	Gunnar Brown	Dans
SP	Ian Korn	Mill Rats
SP	Aaron Moss	Rex
SP	Deron Swanson	Rex
RP	Austin Morris	Dans
RP	Jake Stuteville	Bombers
RP	Breyllin Suriel	Rex
RP	Carter White	Paints

==== Western Conference ====
Hitters
Position	Player	Team
C	Makana Olaso	Pistol Shrimp
1B	Erik Broekemeier	River Dragons
2B	Jack Meyer	Hoots
3B	Bryson Lofton	Hoots
SS	Kyle Gibson	Pistol Shrimp
OF	Tyler Dorsch	Pistol Shrimp
OF	Jalen Martinez	LumberKings
OF	Jaison Andujar	Lucky Horseshoes
UT	Lane Crowden	Catfish
DH	Justin Santoyo	River Dragons

Pitchers
Position	Player	Team
SP	Jimmy Burke	LumberKings
SP	Ean DiPasquale	LumberKings
SP	Jared Herzog	Pistol Shrimp
SP	Trey Waton	Rockabillys
RP	Markell Dixon	Hoots
RP	Harrison Dubois	River Dragons
RP	Sam Lavin	LumberKings
RP	Jaxson Lucas	Rockabillys

=== End of year awards ===
Award	Player	Team
Most Valuable Player	Eric Colaco	Chillicothe Paints
Pro Prospect of the Year	Eric Colaco	Chillicothe Paints
Pitcher of the Year	Ean DiPasquale	Clinton LumberKings
Relief Pitcher of the Year	Jaxson Lucas	Jackson Rockabillys
Manager of the Year	John Jakiemiec	Illinois Valley Pistol Shrimp
Social Media of the Year	N/A	Dubois County Bombers
Broadcaster of the Year	Jacob Wise	Chillicothe Paints
Ballpark Experience of the Year	Marion Stadium	Thrillville Thrillbillies
General Manager of the Year	Bryan Wickline	Chillicothe Paints
Organization of the Year	N/A	O'Fallon Hoots

== Playoffs ==
=== Format ===
The playoffs will begin with four winner-take-all division championships followed by two winner-take-all conference championships and will conclude with a best-of-three league championship series. The playoffs are tentatively slated to begin on August 1 and conclude on August 8.

=== Playoff bracket ===
Division Championship Round
Chillicothe Paints	11
Johnstown Mill Rats	10
↑ Northeast / ↓ Central
Danville Dans	3
Terre Haute Rex	10
↑ Eastern / ↓ Western
Illinois Valley Pistol Shrimp	3
Clinton LumberKings	0
↑ Northwest / ↓ South
Thrillville Thrillbillies	13
Cape Catfish	6

Conference Championship Round
Chillicothe Paints	2
Terre Haute Rex	4
Illinois Valley Pistol Shrimp	11
Thrillville Thrillbillies	5

Prospect League Championship Series (best-of-three)
Terre Haute Rex	8	2	X
Illinois Valley Pistol Shrimp	13	4	X

== See also ==
- 2024 Major League Baseball season
