= 2025 Prospect League season =

16th annual season of the Prospect League

- League: Prospect League
- Sport: Baseball
- Duration: May 27 – July 31 (Playoffs: August 1 – August 7)
- Games: 60 (540 games in total)
- Teams: 18

Northeast Division
- League champions: Lafayette Aviators

Central Division
- League champions: Terre Haute Rex

Northwest Division
- League champions: Clinton LumberKings

South Division
- League champions: Cape Catfish

Prospect League Championship
- Champions: Cape Catfish
- Runners-up: Lafayette Aviators
- Finals MVP: Tank Sims

Seasons
- ← 2024 2026 →

The 2025 Prospect League season was the 16th season of collegiate summer baseball in the Prospect League, a collegiate summer baseball league in the Midwestern United States, since its creation in June 2009. There are 18 Prospect League teams, split evenly between Eastern and Western Conferences. These conferences are then split up between the Northeast, Central, Northwest, and South divisions.

The Illinois Valley Pistol Shrimp entered the season as defending champions, having defeated the Terre Haute Rex, two games to zero, in the league's 2024 championship series.

== Season schedule ==
It was announced during the offseason that the city of Quincy, Illinois would once again have a team in the league after previously being the host city for the Quincy Gems from 2009 to 2023. After months of anticipation it was announced that the team had been given the name the Doggy Paddlers.

The Full Count Rhythm departed the league during the offseason to join the Ohio Valley League.

The 18 teams in the league are split evenly between two conferences Eastern and Western. These two conferences are then split up into four divisions, Northeast, Central, Northwest, and South.

The season will be played with a 60-game schedule, which is split between two halves, with the first half ending on June 30 and the second half ending on July 31. The first-half winners in each division will host the second-half winners in a one-game divisional championship round. (If the same team wins both halves, the team with the next-best second-half record makes the playoffs).

== Regular season standings ==
=== First half standings ===
==== Eastern Conference ====
Northeast Division Regular Season Standings
Pos	Team	G	W	L	Pct.	GB
1	x – Johnstown Mill Rats	26	17	9	.654	--
2	y – Lafayette Aviators	25	15	10	.600	1.5
3	Chillicothe Paints	26	13	13	.500	4.0
4	Champion City Kings	27	3	24	.111	14.5

Central Division Regular Season Standings
Pos	Team	G	W	L	Pct.	GB
1	x – Terre Haute Rex	27	18	9	.667	--
2	y – Normal CornBelters	26	12	14	.462	5.5
3	Dubois County Bombers	26	11	15	.423	6.5
4	Danville Dans	22	9	13	.409	6.5
5	Springfield Lucky Horseshoes	26	8	18	.308	9.5

==== Western Conference ====
Northwest Division Regular Season Standings
Pos	Team	G	W	L	Pct.	GB
1	x – Clinton LumberKings	25	18	7	.720	--
2	y – Burlington Bees	26	12	14	.462	6.5
3	Illinois Valley Pistol Shrimp	25	11	14	.440	7.0
4	Quincy Doggy Paddlers	23	9	14	.391	8.0

South Division Regular Season Standings
Pos	Team	G	W	L	Pct.	GB
1	x – Cape Catfish	27	18	9	.667	--
2	Thrillville Thrillbillies	25	16	9	.640	1.0
3	y – O'Fallon Hoots	26	15	11	.577	2.5
4	Jackson Rockabillys	28	15	13	.536	3.5
5	Alton River Dragons	26	11	15	.423	6.5

=== Second half standings ===
==== Eastern Conference ====
Northeast Division Regular Season Standings
Pos	Team	G	W	L	Pct.	GB
1	y – Lafayette Aviators	31	20	11	.645	--
2	Champion City Kings	28	17	11	.607	1.5
3	Chillicothe Paints	26	12	14	.462	5.5
4	x – Johnstown Mill Rats	29	9	20	.310	10.0

Central Division Regular Season Standings
Pos	Team	G	W	L	Pct.	GB
1	x – Terre Haute Rex	26	17	9	.654	--
2	y – Normal CornBelters	29	12	17	.414	6.5
3	Dubois County Bombers	25	10	15	.400	6.5
4	Danville Dans	29	9	20	.310	9.5
5	Springfield Lucky Horseshoes	25	5	20	.200	11.5

==== Western Conference ====
Northwest Division Regular Season Standings
Pos	Team	G	W	L	Pct.	GB
1	y – Burlington Bees	28	21	7	.750	--
2	Illinois Valley Pistol Shrimp	29	20	9	.690	1.5
3	x – Clinton LumberKings	28	16	12	.571	5.0
4	Quincy Doggy Paddlers	31	7	24	.226	15.5

South Division Regular Season Standings
Pos	Team	G	W	L	Pct.	GB
1	y – O'Fallon Hoots	30	26	4	.867	--
2	x – Cape Catfish	29	18	11	.621	7.5
3	Alton River Dragons	29	14	15	.483	11.5
4	Thrillville Thrillbillies	28	11	17	.393	14.0
5	Jackson Rockabillys	24	8	16	.333	15.0

=== Full season standings ===
==== Eastern Conference ====
Northeast Division Regular Season Standings
Pos	Team	G	W	L	Pct.	GB
1	y – Lafayette Aviators	56	35	21	.625	--
2	Chillicothe Paints	52	25	27	.481	8.0
3	x – Johnstown Mill Rats	55	26	29	.473	8.5
4	Champion City Kings	55	20	35	.364	14.5

Central Division Regular Season Standings
Pos	Team	G	W	L	Pct.	GB
1	x – Terre Haute Rex	53	35	18	.660	--
2	y – Normal CornBelters	55	24	31	.436	12.0
3	Dubois County Bombers	51	21	30	.412	13.0
4	Danville Dans	51	18	33	.353	16.0
5	Springfield Lucky Horseshoes	51	13	38	.255	21.0

==== Western Conference ====
Northwest Division Regular Season Standings
Pos	Team	G	W	L	Pct.	GB
1	x – Clinton LumberKings	53	34	19	.642	--
2	y – Burlington Bees	54	33	21	.611	1.5
3	Illinois Valley Pistol Shrimp	54	31	23	.574	3.5
4	Quincy Doggy Paddlers	54	16	38	.296	18.5

South Division Regular Season Standings
Pos	Team	G	W	L	Pct.	GB
1	y – O'Fallon Hoots	56	41	15	.732	--
2	x – Cape Catfish	56	36	20	.643	5.0
3	Thrillville Thrillbillies	53	27	26	.509	12.5
4	Alton River Dragons	55	25	30	.455	15.5
5	Jackson Rockabillys	52	23	29	.442	16.0

- x – First Half Winner, clinched playoff spot
- y – Second Half Winner, clinched playoff spot

== Statistical leaders ==
=== Hitting ===
Stat	Player	Team	Total
HR	Wally Diaz	Terre Haute Rex	14
AVG	Cole Yearsley	Burlington Bees	.421
RBIs	Felix Polanco	Terre Haute Rex	51
SB	Nomar Garcia	Terre Haute Rex	44

=== Pitching ===
Stat	Player	Team	Total
W	Samuel Guadamuz	Terre Haute Rex	8
ERA	Samuel Guadamuz	Terre Haute Rex	2.16
SO	Samuel Guadamuz	Terre Haute Rex	63
SV	Jaxson Lucas	Jackson Rockabillys	11

== Awards ==
=== All-star selections ===
==== Eastern Conference ====
Hitters
Position	Player	Team
C	Keifer Wilson	Aviators
C	Nate Hill	Paints
IF	Jackson Stanek	CornBelters
IF	Wally Diaz	Rex
IF	Cole Nathan	Bombers
IF	Tyler Thompson	CornBelters
IF	Felix Polanco	Rex
IF	Al Ramos	Mill Rats
IF	Jackson Smith	CornBelters
IF	Cam Gravelle	Paints
IF	Jorge Santana II	Dans
OF	Gabe Wright	Rex
OF	Houston Markham	Bombers
OF	Louie Bartletti	Lucky Horseshoes
OF	Brady Lester	Kings
OF	Hunter Snow	Aviators
OF	Alex Bemis	Paints
OF	Jarrett Chapman	Lucky Horseshoes

Pitchers
Position	Player	Team
SP	Jack Gleason	Dans
SP	Samuel Guadamuz	Rex
SP	John Hojnowski	Mill Rats
SP	Deron Swanson	Rex
SP	Wesley Culley	Aviators
SP	Zach Cabell	Kings
SP	Joe Tootle	Mill Rats
RP	Zach O'Donnell	CornBelters
RP	Breyllin Suriel	Rex
RP	Mick Uebelhor	Bombers
RP	Jake Stuteville	Bombers
RP	Aiden Cline	Aviators

==== Western Conference ====
Hitters
Position	Player	Team
C	Jake Merda	Doggy Paddlers
C	Mason Schwalbach	Bees
IF	Cole Cahill	Thrillbillies
IF	Sam Wiese	LumberKings
IF	Cooper Newsom	Catfish
IF	Kooper Schulte	Bees
IF	James Love	Pistol Shrimp
IF	Caleb Seibers	Bees
IF	Drew Terpins	LumberKings
IF	Charlie Isom-McCall	Thrillbillies
IF	Wandel Campana	Doggy Paddlers
IF	Caleb Clealand	River Dragons
OF	Joe Connolly	River Dragons
OF	Jimmy Koza	Doggy Paddlers
OF	Baden Hackworth	Hoots
OF	Nathan Bowie	Catfish
OF	Caleb Champion	Catfish
OF	Mitchell Bonczkowski	Hoots

Pitchers
Position	Player	Team
SP	Jackson Parrill	River Dragons
SP	Nick Baffa	LumberKings
SP	Kaelen Clarkson	Bees
SP	Chase Chamberlain	Rockabillys
SP	JC Dermody	LumberKings
SP	Cooper Casteel	Rockabillys
RP	Braeden Sunken	Bees
RP	Walker Brodt	Catfish
RP	Joey Funk	Hoots
RP	Tyler Deleskiewicz	Pistol Shrimp
RP	Jaxson Lucas	Rockabillys
RP	Payton Hodges	LumberKings

=== End of year awards ===
Award	Player	Team
Most Valuable Player	Wally Diaz	Terre Haute Rex
Pro Prospect of the Year	Wally Diaz	Terre Haute Rex
Pitcher of the Year	Samuel Guadamuz	Terre Haute Rex
Relief Pitcher of the Year	Parker Primeaux	Illinois Valley Pistol Shrimp
Manager of the Year	Jack Dahm	Clinton LumberKings
Social Media of the Year	N/A	Illinois Valley Pistol Shrimp
Broadcaster of the Year	Jacob Wise	Chillicothe Paints
Ballpark Experience of the Year	League Stadium	Dubois County Bombers
General Manager of the Year	Sarah Rex	Johnstown Mill Rats
Organization of the Year	N/A	Cape Catfish
Staff of the Year	N/A	O'Fallon Hoots

== Playoffs ==
=== Format ===
The playoffs will begin with four winner-take-all division championships followed by two winner-take-all conference championships and will conclude with a best-of-three league championship series. The playoffs are tentatively slated to begin on August 1 and conclude on August 8.

=== Playoff bracket ===
Division Championship Round
Johnstown Mill Rats	3
Lafayette Aviators	4
↑ Northeast / ↓ Central
Terre Haute Rex	5
Normal CornBelters	1
↑ Eastern / ↓ Western
Clinton LumberKings	3
Burlington Bees	2
↑ Northwest / ↓ South
Cape Catfish	7
O'Fallon Hoots	2

Conference Championship Round
Lafayette Aviators	9
Terre Haute Rex	0
Clinton LumberKings	1
Cape Catfish	3

Prospect League Championship Series (best-of-three)
Lafayette Aviators	3	2	X
Cape Catfish	7	6	X

== See also ==
- 2025 FCBL season
- 2025 Major League Baseball season
