= Twin City Stars =

The Twin City Stars was a Central Illinois Collegiate League baseball team located in the twin cities of Normal, Illinois and Bloomington, Illinois. The Stars' home fields were Duffy Bass Field on the campus of Illinois State University and Horenberger Field on the campus of Illinois Wesleyan University. The team was founded in 1982 by Illinois State University Hall of Fame Coach Buford "Duffy" Bass and his graduate assistant coach, Eldon Warfield. Former Stars players who reached the major leagues include Ben Zobrist, Paul Wagner, Sal Fasano and Mickey Morandini.

== History ==
In 1982 the Twin City Stars were formed out of the memory of the Bloomington Bobcats, which had dissolved several years earlier. The Twin City Stars were in existence from 1992 through 2006. In 2009, the Central Illinois Collegiate (CICL) was succeeded by The Prospect League and expanded to stretch from Missouri to Pennsylvania. The league remains in operations today.
