= Danville Dans =

Logo
Cap insignia

Information
- League: Prospect League (2009–present) (Eastern Conference – Central Division)
- Location: Danville, Illinois
- Ballpark: Danville Stadium
- Founded: 1989
- League championships: 9 (1989, 1991, 1992, 1994, 1997, 1999, 2000, 2001, 2003)
- Division championships: 1 (2010)
- Former league: Central Illinois Collegiate League (1989–2008)
- Colors: Forest green, red, white
- Ownership: Rick Kurth
- General manager: Jeanie Cooke & Rick Kurth
- Manager: Cam Gross
- Media: Commercial-News
- Website: danvilledans.com

The Danville Dans are a collegiate summer league baseball team located in Danville, Illinois. The team plays in the Prospect League, which their former league, the NCAA-sanctioned Central Illinois Collegiate League, was absorbed into after the 2008 season.

In their history as a CICL team, the Dans won nine tournament titles. Since the merger of the CICL and the Prospect League, the Dans have qualified for the playoffs four times, with their best finish coming in 2010, when they were the runner-up to the league champion, Chillicothe Paints.

The Dans play in the Prospect League's Eastern Conference – Central Division along with the Decatur Bean Ballers, Dubois County Bombers, Springfield Lucky Horseshoes, and Terre Haute Rex.

== Stadium ==
The Dans play their home games in 5,021-seat Danville Stadium. During the 2017 season, just under 50,000 people attended Danville Dans games, ranking the stadium as the second-most visited facility in the Prospect League in terms of overall fans and average per game.

== Seasons ==
Season	Manager	Record	Win %	League	Division	GB	Post-season record	Post-season win %	Postseason result	Notes
2008	Pete Paciorek	24–23	.511				1–2	.333	Lost Central Illinois Collegiate League Championship (Springfield)	
2009	Pete Paciorek	32–21	.604	2nd	2nd	2.5	0–0	.000	Did not qualify	Prospect League Inaugural Season
2010	Steve Bieser	32–24	.570	3rd	1st	–	2–1	.667	Won Central Division Championship (Nashville); Won Semifinals (Quincy); Lost Prospect League Championship (Chillicothe)	
2011	Mike Hutcheon	25–29	.463	10th	5th	12.0	0–0	.000	Did not qualify	
2012	Jamie Sailors	17–43	.283	11th	6th	21.0	0–0	.000	Did not qualify	
2013	Jamie Sailors	41–19	.683	1st	1st	–	0–2	.000	Lost West Division Championship (Quincy)	2nd best regular season winning percentage in league history
2014	Eric Coleman	31–29	.517	6th	3rd	8.5	0–0	.000	Did not qualify	
2015	Eric Coleman	31–29	.517	6th	2nd	12.0	0–0	.000	Did not qualify	
2016	Eric Coleman	35–25	.583	4th	4th	4.5	0–0	.000	Did not qualify	
2017	Eric Coleman	31–29	.517	4th	3rd	5.0	0–0	.000	Did not qualify	
2018	Eric Coleman	35–23	.603	2nd	1st	–	1–2	.333	Lost West Division Championship (Terre Haute)	
2019	Eric Coleman	40–20	.667	3rd	2nd	–	0–1	.000	Lost East Division Championship (Chillicothe)	
2020	Season cancelled (COVID-19 pandemic)									
2021	Eric Coleman	36–22	.621	3rd	2nd	4.5	0–1	.000	Lost Wabash River Division Championship (Lafayette)	
2022	Eric Coleman	40–17	.702	1st	1st	–	0–1	.000	Lost Wabash River Division Championship (Illinois Valley)	
2023	Eric Coleman	33–23	.589	3rd	1st	–	0–1	.000	Lost Wabash River Division Championship (Springfield)	
2024	Eric Coleman	30–26	.536	8th	2nd	2.5	0–1	.000	Lost Central Division Championship (Terre Haute)	
2025	Eric Coleman	18–33	.353	16th	4th	16.0	0–0	.000	Did not qualify	
2026	Cam Gross	31–23	.574	6th	1st	–	0–0	.000	Did not qualify (Note: Even though Danville finished 1st in the overall standings, they failed to make the playoffs due to not winning either half season title.)	
Totals		562–458	.551				4–12	.250		

== Roster ==
Danville Dans roster
Active roster	Coaching staff
Pitchers: 18 Declan Bowers; 23 James Duckworth; 32 Jackson Frasure; 10 Chase Harrison; 16 Nolan Hataway; 3 Drake Hoffa; 17 Jackson Kees; 6 Caden Keleminic; 29 Sam McArthur; 20 Drew Ogden; 35 Austin Penry; 21 Cooper Pumphrey; 2 Pedro Rangel; 15 Hudson Roberts; 30 Addison Stockham; 31 Sebastian Talaga; 26 Kaleb Thompkins; 34 Hayden Trier; Catchers: 24 JJ Baysinger; 33 Mark Rutherford III; 13 Jackson Wagner; Infielders: 9 Chase Bays; 12 Carson Brady; 8 Will Burke; 28 Cade Farquer; 22 Mason McReynolds; 1 Nick Palmi; -- Drew Pinkston; 19 Nicholas Sedam; 7 Josiah Sems; 27 Cannon Vandever; Outfielders: 5 Cameron Steinbaugh; 25 Owen Strahl; 11 Amir Streeter	Manager: -- Cam Gross; Coaches: -- Justin Carinci (hitting); -- Jacob Ferguson (pitching); Disabled list; ‡ Inactive list; § Suspended list; updated June 5, 2026
