= Normal CornBelters =

American collegiate summer baseball team

Logo
Cap insignia

Information
- League: Prospect League (2019–present) (Western Conference – Northwest Division)
- Location: Normal, Illinois
- Ballpark: The Corn Crib
- Founded: 2009
- League championships: 0
- Division championships: 0
- Former league: Frontier League (2010–2018)
- Colors: Green, yellow, black, white
- Mascot: Corny
- Ownership: Matt Stembridge
- General manager: Jarrett Rodgers
- Manager: Billy DuBois
- Media: The Pantagraph
- Website: www.cornbeltersbaseball.com

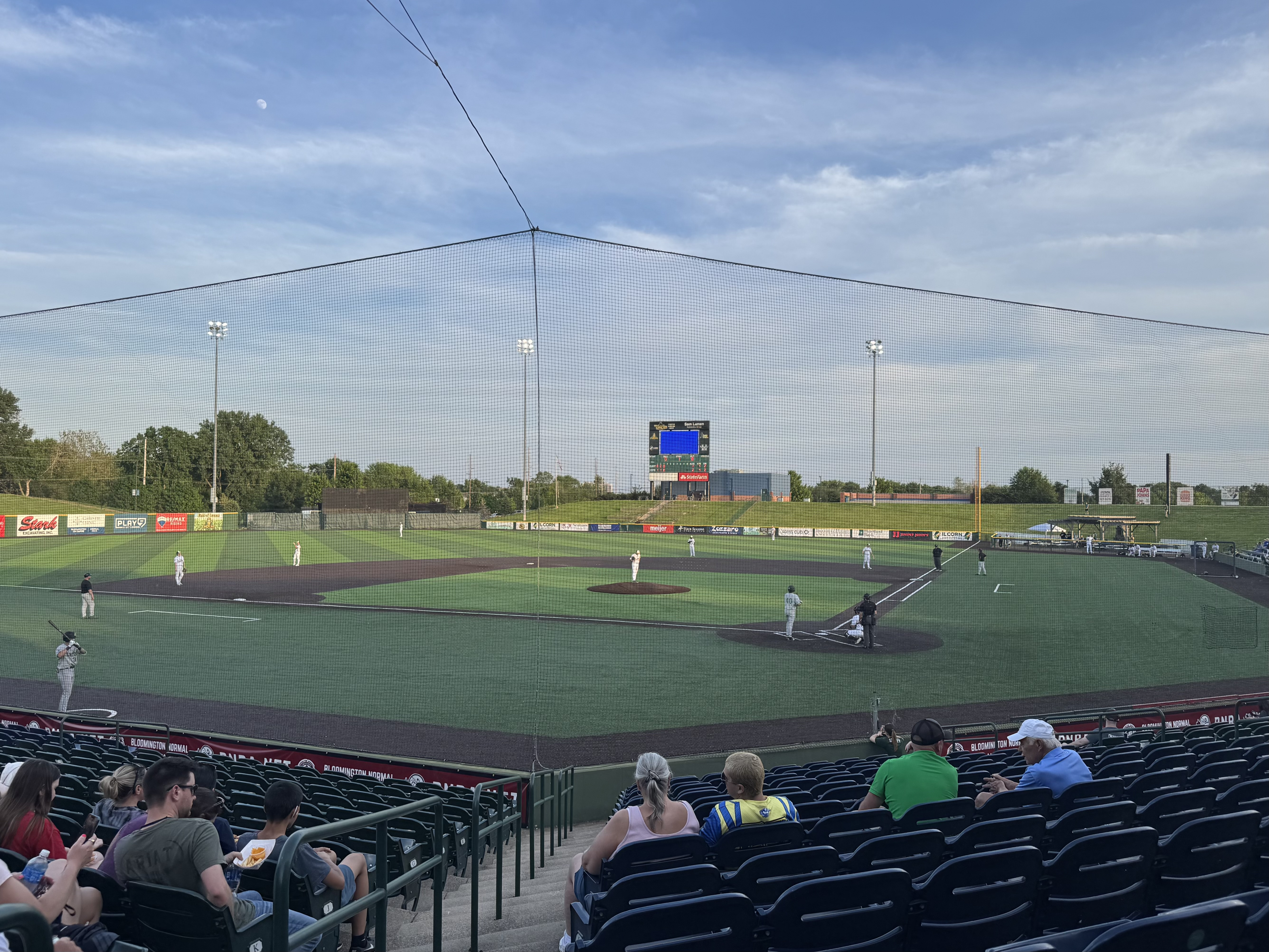
The Corn Crib at the CornBelters home opener on May 27, 2026

The Normal CornBelters are a collegiate summer baseball team based in Normal, Illinois, which is part of the Bloomington-Normal metropolitan area. The franchise was formerly a professional team, and was a member of the independent Frontier League, which is not affiliated with Major League Baseball.

The CornBelters play in the Prospect League's Western Conference – Northwest Division along with the Burlington Bees, Clinton LumberKings, Illinois Valley Pistol Shrimp, and Quincy Doggy Paddlers.

== Stadium ==
On March 30, 2009, ground was broken for a $12 million multi-purpose stadium adjacent to Heartland Community College on Raab Road. The CornBelters will share the facility with Heartland's baseball, softball, and soccer programs. The facility was completed in time for the CornBelters' inaugural 2010 season.

On October 20, 2009, it was announced that the stadium would be known as The Corn Crib. The name was the result of a naming rights partnership with the Illinois Corn Marketing Board (ICMB). The naming rights agreement lasts for two years with an "automatic renewal". Both team and ICMB officials declined to disclose the financial terms of the partnership.

== History ==
=== Name-the-team contest ===
The CornBelters were named after a fan vote to determine the name. A publicity stunt occurred after the four finalists were unveiled:

- Normal Nutz; an homage to the Beer Nuts brand based in nearby Bloomington (NOTE: The entries were originally "Nuts", but the ownership modified it to avoid conflict with the California League's Modesto Nuts)
- Normal NightHawks; a popular alliterative nickname.
- Normal CornBelters; a reference to Illinois' location in the Corn Belt. "Belt" is also a slang term meaning to hit the ball hard.
- Normal Coal Bears; submitted by fans of political satirist and The Colbert Report host Stephen Colbert (pronounced [kʰɔlˈbɛɹ], just like "coal bear"). In addition to the reference, Illinois (especially the west side of Bloomington-Normal) also has a strong heritage in coal mining.

In addition, two other choices were later added:

- Normal Fellers; an homage to Jesse W. Fell, the founder of Illinois State University (ergo, the founder of the city of Normal), as well as the term "Feller" referring to "regular guy".
- Normal CamelBacks; an homage to Camelback Bridge, built to allow steam locomotives to pass underneath and currently arching over Constitution Trail. It is listed on the U.S. National Register of Historic Places.

=== 2010 season ===
Hal Lanier was announced as the team's first manager on October 7, 2009. Lanier managed the Houston Astros to a division title in 1986 and is a former Major League player and coach as well. Over 21 seasons as a major, minor and independent league manager, Lanier has compiled a record of 1,338–1,033.

The Normal CornBelters' inaugural season schedule was released on October 16, 2009. The CornBelters' season opened at the Evansville Otters on May 21, 2010. The home opener, the first in team history, was played at 7 p.m. on June 1, 2010, against the Windy City ThunderBolts. The team had 51 home games in 2010 and their season ended on September 5, 2010. The team finished with a 44–52 record. Two CornBelters were named 2010 All-Stars and played in the All-Star Game: RHP Tyler Lavigne and 3B Daniel Cox.

== Seasons ==
Normal CornBelters of the Frontier League
Season	Manager	Record	Win %	League	Division	GB	Post-season record	Post-season win %	Post-season result	Notes
2010	Hal Lanier	44–52	.302	8th	4th	20.0	0–0	.000	Did not qualify	
2011	Hal Lanier	46–50	.479	7th	3rd	22.5	0–0	.000	Did not qualify	
2012	Chad Parker	29–67	.302	13th	7th	28.0	0–0	.000	Did not qualify	
2013	Chad Parker	46–50	.479	10th	5th	13.0	0–0	.000	Did not qualify	
2014	Brooks Carey	48–47	.505	7th	4th	12.5	0–0	.000	Did not qualify	
2015	Brooks Carey	61–35	.635	2nd	1st	–	0–2	.000	Lost West Division Championship (Traverse City)	
2016	Brooks Carey	45–50	.474	7th	5th	17.5	0–0	.000	Did not qualify	
2017	Brooks Carey	48–48	.500	7th	4th	13.5	0–0	.000	Did not qualify	
2018	Billy Horn	48–47	.505	7th	4th	3.5	0–0	.000	Did not qualify	
Normal CornBelters of the Prospect League
Season	Manager	Record	Win %	League	Division	GB	Post-season record	Post-season win %	Post-season result	Notes
2019	Rick White	21–39	.394	9th	5th	22.0	0–0	.000	Did not qualify	
2020	Season cancelled (COVID-19 pandemic)									
2021	Calvin Peacock	31–29	.517	6th	1st	–	0–1	.000	Lost Great River Division Championship (Clinton)	
2022	Andy Turner	31–28	.525	6th	1st	–	0–1	.000	Lost Great River Division Championship (Quincy)	
2023	Andy Turner	27–30	.474	10th	2nd	6.5	0–0	.000	Did not qualify	
2024	Billy DuBois	28–27	.509	10th	3rd	4.0	0–0	.000	Did not qualify	
2025	Billy DuBois	24–31	.436	13th	2nd	12.0	0–1	.000	Lost Central Division Championship (Terre Haute)	
2026	Billy DuBois	33–22	.600	5th	3rd	1.5	0–0	.000	Did not qualify	
Totals		610–652	.483				0–5	.000		

== Roster ==
Normal CornBelters roster
Active roster	Coaching staff
Pitchers: 6 Braden Arrenholz; -- Brady Banker; 29 Nicholas Currie; 22 Matt Cuzco; 13 Brodie Farrell; 18 Brock Fearday; 11 Isaac Graf; 41 Josh Jones; 32 Graham Kasey; 38 Yatharth Kaushik; 31 Tucker King; 17 Edward Konow; 19 Nick Krueger; 43 Troy McLeese; 34 Wyatt Mammen; 36 Jacob McPherson; 37 Mason Orton; 27 Will Paxson; 12 Jonah Roper; 28 Joe Stellano; 26 Jake Swartz; 42 Eli Tritinger; 8 Luka Zakman; Utility players: 7 Tyler Thompson; 45 Beckett Weber; Catchers: 44 Jake Greer; 25 Max Heineman; Infielders: 2 Parker Heistand; 21 Eli Kieser; 33 Nolan McCrossin; 9 Gavin Michaels; 1 Dillon Romano; 5 Jackson Stanek; 23 Charlie Vercruysse; 4 Ben Voegele; Outfielders: 3 Filippo Baratta; 16 Carter Bleakney; 14 Dylan Coty; 40 Adison Worthman	Manager: -- Billy DuBois; Coaches: -- Jackson Blemler (third base); -- Ron Juris (first base); -- Nick Roseman (bench); -- Ryne Willard (pitching); Disabled list; ‡ Inactive list; § Suspended list; updated June 28, 2026
