= Jackson Rockabillys =

- Logo

Information
- League: Prospect League (Western Conference – South Division)
- Location: Jackson, Tennessee
- Ballpark: The Ballpark at Jackson
- Founded: 2023
- League championships: 0
- Division championships: 0
- Colors: Navy, purple, copper, gray, silver, white, blue suede
- Mascot: JR the Billy Goat
- Ownership: Dennis Bastien
- General manager: Dennis Bastien
- Manager: Matty Holem
- Website: rockabillysbaseball.com/landing/index

The Jackson Rockabillys are a collegiate summer league baseball team of the Prospect League. They are located in Jackson, Tennessee, and play their home games at The Ballpark at Jackson. The Rockabillys and other collegiate summer leagues and teams exist to give top college players a professional-like experience without affecting NCAA eligibility.

The Rockabillys play in the Prospect League's Western Conference – South Division along with the Alton River Dragons, Cape Catfish, O'Fallon Hoots, and Thrillville Thrillbillies.

== History ==
Jackson's previous summer baseball team was the Jackson Generals, a professional minor league Double-A affiliate from its inception in 1998 to its folding in 2020. The Generals served as a minor league affiliate to the Chicago Cubs, Seattle Mariners, and Arizona Diamondbacks during their existence as a franchise. However, the Generals lost their minor league affiliation during Major League Baseball's reorganization of the minor leagues after the 2020 season. The Generals folded shortly thereafter, leaving the city of Jackson without a team.

On December 14, 2021, the Prospect League announced that a franchise had been awarded to the city of Jackson, with Big Inning, LLC and Dennis Bastien as the owners of the team.

On June 20, 2022, the team was officially named the Rockabillys.

== Stadium ==
The Rockabillys play at The Ballpark at Jackson, a 6,000-seat facility owned and operated by the city of Jackson, Tennessee. The facility was built in 1998 and is located at 4 Fun Place in Jackson.

== Seasons ==
Season	Manager	Record	Win %	League	Division	GB	Post-season record	Post-season win %	Post-season result	Notes
2023	Matt Franco	16–41	.281	17th	5th	23.0	0–0	.000	Did not qualify	Inaugural season
2024	Sam Quinn-Loeb	33–22	.600	4th	1st	–	0–0	.000	Did not qualify (Note: Even though Jackson finished 1st in the overall standings, they failed to make the playoffs due to not winning either half season title.)	
2025	Sam Quinn-Loeb	23–29	.442	12th	5th	16.0	0–0	.000	Did not qualify	
2026	Matty Holem	31–24	.564	7th	3rd	14.0	0–0	.000	Did not qualify	
Totals		103–116	.470				0–0	.000		

== Roster ==
Jackson Rockabillys roster
Active roster	Coaching staff
Pitchers: 19 Joaquin Baranchuk; 30 Brody Casteel; 47 Cole Cates; 16 Kaden Crawford; 36 Tag Dillard; -- Elias Hachem; -- Tate Hickman; -- Jakob Holzer; 7 Colton Landtiser; -- Karson Lindsey; 20 Cy Maness; 9 Andrew McCary; 21 Caden Noble; 12 Dante Onorato; 11 Brandon Todd; 31 Esteban Torres; 40 Jaxon Valdez; 15 Keith Wallace; Catchers: 25 Brock Donnelly; 32 Zachary Long; -- Max Miller; Infielders: 38 Brett Haggerty; 22 Ayden Makarus; 4 Logan Luckett; 2 Bryce Messer; 24 Hayden Mosley; -- Pranav Sundar; 28 Nick Tobin; Outfielders: 6 Parker Blackman; 0 Wyatt Bowling; 1 Zavier Hatfield; -- Kyle Neri; 3 Chase Oliver; 8 Zach Robinson; -- Bryce Thompson; 23 Anane Wilson	Manager: 18 Matty Holem; Coaches: 46 James Dillard (pitching); 41 Jared Kirkman (assistant); 33 Jordan Severs (hitting); Disabled list; ‡ Inactive list; § Suspended list; updated June 5, 2026
