= Terre Haute Rex =

Collegiate summer baseball league team in Terre Haute, Indiana

Terre Haute REX
- Logo

Information
- League: Prospect League (Eastern Conference – Central Division)
- Location: Terre Haute, Indiana
- Ballpark: Bob Warn Field at Sycamore Stadium
- Founded: 2010
- League championships: 2 (2015, 2018)
- Division championships: 5 (2015, 2018, 2024, 2025, 2026)
- Colors: Blue, black, white
- Ownership: Sycamore Foundation Holdings
- General manager: Bruce Rosselli
- Manager: Tony Rosselli
- Media: tribstar
- Website: threxbaseball.com

The Terre Haute REX are a collegiate summer baseball team based in Terre Haute, Indiana. They are a member of the summer collegiate Prospect League.

They are managed by Tony Rosselli.

The Rex play home games at Bob Warn Field at Sycamore Stadium, also the home of Indiana State University's baseball team.

The Terre Haute Rex are named after a prominent product with a historic connection to the community. Rex Coffee, produced by Clabber Girl, the “Imperial blend, fit for a Monarch” was roasted and packed in downtown Terre Haute, with a history dating back over a century. Patented in 1905, Rex Coffee was a household name from Chicago to Louisville; and from Cincinnati to St. Louis. The selection of the 'Rex' name continues a Terre Haute tradition of unique baseball team names that includes the Huts, Tots, Stags, Terre-iers and Highlanders.

The Rex play in the Prospect League's Eastern Conference – Central Division along with the Danville Dans, Decatur Bean Ballers, Dubois County Bombers, and Springfield Lucky Horseshoes.

== 2011 ==
In 2011, a new team fight song, titled "Come On Rex!" debuted at the home contests. "Come On Rex" was written by Alan Barcus, an Indiana State University alum and the composer of the popular song "You're My Cubs!" which has played inside Wrigley Field at Chicago Cubs home games for several seasons.

== 2012 ==
The Indiana State University Athletics Department Facilities and Game Management crew were hired by the REX prior to the start of the 2012 season and were named the 2012 Prospect League Rookie Grounds Crew of the Year following the season.

Manager Brian Dorsett was tabbed the Manager of the Year (sharing the honor with Dubois County's Ryan Anderson); the Rex also had three All-Stars. Relief Pitcher Nick Blount, Shortstop Nick Johnson and Centerfielder Kyle Kempf.

== Seasons ==
Season	Manager	Record	Win %	Division	GB	Post-season record	Post-season win %	Post-season result	Notes
2010	Brian Dorsett	29–26	.527	4th	2.5	0–0	.000	Did not qualify	
2011	Brian Dorsett	34–22	.607	2nd	4.0	0–1	.000	Lost West Division Championship (Quincy)	Made playoffs as a result of 2nd Half division title
2012	Brian Dorsett	38–22	.633	1st	–	0–1	.000	Lost West Division Championship (Dubois County)	Made playoffs as a result of 2nd Half division title
2013	Neil Walton	32–28	.533	3rd	9.0	0–0	.000	Did not qualify	
2014	Bobby Segal	37–23	.617	2nd	2.5	0–0	.000	Did not qualify	
2015	Bobby Segal	43–17	.717	1st	–	4–0	1.000	Won West Division Championship (Danville); Won Prospect League Championship (West Virginia)	Made playoffs as a result of 1st and 2nd Half division title
2016	Tyler Wampler	35–24	.593	3rd	4.0	0–0	.000	Did not qualify	
2017	Tyler Wampler	32–28	.533	2nd	4.0	1–2	.333	Lost West Division Championship (Lafayette)	Made playoffs with 2nd best record in West division
2018	Tyler Wampler	35–24	.593	2nd	0.5	4–1	.800	Won West Division Championship (Danville); Won Prospect League Championship (Kokomo)	Made playoffs with 2nd best record in West division
2019	Tyler Wampler	35–25	.583	3rd	5.0	0–0	.000	Did not qualify	
2020	Season cancelled (COVID-19 pandemic)								
2021	A. J. Reed	20–40	.333	4th	21.5	0–0	.000	Did not qualify	
2022	Matt Chavarria	37–23	.617	3rd	4.5	0–0	.000	Did not qualify	
2023	Harry Markotay	23–33	.411	4th	10.0	0–0	.000	Did not qualify	
2024	Tony Rosselli	32–23	.582	1st	–	2–2	.500	Won Central Division Championship (Danville); Won Eastern Conference Championship (Chillicothe); Lost Prospect League Championship (Illinois Valley)	
2025	Tony Rosselli	35–18	.660	1st	–	1–1	.500	Won Central Division Championship (Normal); Lost Eastern Conference Championship (Lafayette)	
2026	Tony Rosselli	28–27	.509	2nd	3.5	3–2	.600	Won Central Division Championship (Dubois County); Won Eastern Conference Championship (Lafayette); Lost Prospect League Championship (Cape)	
Totals		525–403	.566			15–10	.600		

== Roster ==
Terre Haute Rex roster
Active roster	Coaching staff
Pitchers: -- Terrius Causey; 18 Fernando Crisostomo; 35 Grant Faris; 31 Andrew Guzman; 33 Trey Harney; 26 Tommy Johnson; 36 Cam Judson; 30 Deaglan McBride; 8 Jean Quezada; 32 Chase Rubenacker; 38 Brady Shaw; 19 Hayden Slate; 7 Breyllin Suriel; 14 Juju Thompson; Utility players: 1 Nate Millington; Catchers: 12 Dallas Coleman; 10 Renn Harper; -- Wyatt Johnson; 6 Ben Jones; Infielders: -- Deakin Brinkley; 27 Wally Diaz; 2 Darluin Ferreira; 20 Johan Ferreira; 9 Nomar Garcia; 13 Joseph Gutierrez; 28 Carter Murphy; Outfielders: 4 Bryson Carpenter; 34 Nick Cook; 24 Ben Kearns; 15 Andrew Ortiz	Manager: -- Tony Rosselli; Coaches: -- Gabe Wright (assistant); Disabled list; ‡ Inactive list; § Suspended list; updated June 5, 2026
