= Cape Catfish =

- Logo

Information
- League: Prospect League (Western Conference – South Division)
- Location: Cape Girardeau, MO
- Ballpark: Capaha Field
- Founded: 2018
- League championships: 2021; 2025; 2026
- Division championships: 2019; 2021; 2025; 2026
- Colors: Dark green, gold, white
- Ownership: Anand "Andy" Patel, Mark Hogan, Kishan Patel and James Limbaugh
- General manager: Mark Hogan
- Manager: Colin Butkiewicz
- Media: The Southeast Missourian
- Website: CapeCatfish.com

The Cape Catfish are a franchise of the Prospect League that plays in Cape Girardeau, Missouri.

The Catfish play in the Prospect League's Western Conference – South Division along with the Alton River Dragons, Jackson Rockabillys, O'Fallon Hoots, and Thrillville Thrillbillies.

== Ownership ==
The team is owned by a partnership group that includes Anand "Andy" Patel, Mark Hogan, Kishan Patel and James Limbaugh. Hogan, a retired former baseball coach at Southeast Missouri State University, will also serve as the team's General manager.

== Name origin ==
The Catfish name, a reference to the state fish of Missouri, was chosen by potential fans of the new team from a list of names that also included the Cape Bluebirds, in reference to the Eastern bluebird, which is the state bird of Missouri, and the Cape Steamboats, in honor of the Mississippi River city's history as a port on the river. "Catfish" received about 37% of the vote fan vote, beating out "Bluebirds" and "Steamboats", which received 32% and 31% of the vote, respectively.

== Stadium ==
The Catfish play in 2,000 seat Capaha Field. The stadium, also home to Southeast Missouri State University's baseball team, received significant renovations prior to the beginning of the team's first season.

== Inaugural season ==
On October 16, 2018, the team announced that former Texas Rangers and Cincinnati Reds farmhand Steve Larkin will serve as the manager for the 2019 season. The team clinched the league's West Division championship on August 1, tying the league record for wins in a season in the process.

== Seasons ==
Season	Manager	Record	Win %	League	Division	GB	Post-season record	Post-season win %	Post-season result	Notes
2019	Stephen Larkin	43–17	.717	1st	1st	–	2–2	.500	Won West Division Championship (DuPage); Lost Prospect League Championship (Chillicothe)	
2020	Season cancelled (COVID-19 pandemic)									
2021	Stephen Larkin	38–22	.633	2nd	1st	–	4–1	.800	Won Prairie Land Division Championship (O'Fallon); Won West Conference Championship (Clinton); Won Prospect League Championship (Lafayette)	
2022	Stephen Larkin	26–33	.441	12th	4th	5.5	0–0	.000	Did not qualify	
2023	Scott Little	39–18	.684	2nd	1st	–	0–1	.000	Lost Prairie Land Division Championship (Thrillville)	
2024	Phil Butler	31–25	.554	7th	3rd	2.5	0–1	.000	Lost South Division Championship (Thrillville)	
2025	Gary McClure	36–20	.643	3rd	1st	–	4–0	1.000	Won South Division Championship (O'Fallon); Won Western Conference Championship (Clinton); Won Prospect League Championship (Lafayette)	
2026	Colin Butkiewicz	45–10	.818	1st	1st	–	4–1	.800	Won South Division Championship (O'Fallon); Won Western Conference Championship Quincy; Won Prospect League Championship (Terre Haute)	
Totals		258–145	.640				14–6	.700		

== Roster ==
Cape Catfish roster
Active roster	Coaching staff
Pitchers: 58 Trenton Chenard; 25 Gabe Dirnberger; 29 Eric Enerlich; 14 Jackson Gamble; 18 Adam Horst; 9 Will Inman; 21 Noah Johnson; 27 Cade Mungle; 13 Chapman Ogles; 30 Troy O’Keefe; 17 Caleb Oligschlaeger; 31 Luis Pezzotti; 3 Aiden Redmond; 2 Luke Scherrman; 5 Xzavier Vargas; 51 Jack Willhite; 4 Sean Williams; 16 Smith Wortham; 37 Cornelius Wouters; Catchers: 28 Paxton Flagg; 0 Jaxon Jones; 8 Spike Magill; 23 Enrique Villanueva; Infielders: 32 Pete Britton; 26 Teague Hoover; 24 David Kessler; -- Andres Matias; 7 Caden Nelson; 36 Collin Senkpeil; 6 Cam Stratton; Outfielders: 22 Nate Dorinksy; 1 Leyton Ivers; 15 Easton Jones; -- Trey Majette; 11 Hayden Nazarenus	Manager: -- Gary McClure; Coaches: -- CJ Backer (assistant); -- Colin Butkiewicz (assistant); Disabled list; ‡ Inactive list; § Suspended list; updated June 5, 2026
