= Thrillville Thrillbillies =

- Logo

Information
- League: Prospect League (Western Conference – South Division)
- Location: Marion, Illinois
- Ballpark: Marion Stadium
- Founded: 2023
- League championships: 0
- Division championships: 2 (2023, 2024)
- Colors: Black, orange, red, gray, white
- Mascot: Ryder the Rabbit
- Ownership: Rodney Cabaness, Shad Zimbro & Black Diamond Family of Businesses
- General manager: Ralph Santana
- Manager: Patrick Morey
- Website: thrillbillies.com/landing/index

The Thrillville Thrillbillies are a collegiate summer league baseball team of the Prospect League. They are located in Marion, Illinois, and play their home games at Marion Stadium. The Thrillbillies and other collegiate summer leagues and teams exist to give top college players a professional-like experience without affecting NCAA eligibility.

The Thrillbillies play in the Prospect League's Western Conference – South Division along with the Alton River Dragons, Cape Catfish, Jackson Rockabillys, and O'Fallon Hoots.

== History ==
Marion's previous summer baseball team was the Southern Illinois Miners, a professional independent team that played in the Frontier League from the team's inception in 2007 to its folding in 2021. On October 6, 2021, the Miners folded when their owners, Jayne and John Simmons, retired, leaving the city of Marion without a team.

On August 24, 2022, the Prospect League announced that a franchise had been awarded to the city of Marion, with Black Diamond Family of Businesses, Rodney Cabaness, and Shad Zimbro as the owners of the team.

On February 24, 2023, the team was officially named the Thrillbillies.

== Stadium ==
The Thrillbillies play at Marion Stadium, a 7,000-seat facility owned and operated by Marion Stadium LLC. The facility was built in 2007 and is located at 1000 Miners Drive in Marion.

== Seasons ==
Season	Manager	Record	Win %	League	Division	GB	Post-season record	Post-season win %	Post-season result	Notes
2023	Ralph Santana	34–21	.618	3rd	2nd	4.0	1–1	.500	Won Prairie Land Division Championship (Cape); Lost Western Conference Championship (Quincy)	Inaugural season
2024	Ralph Santana	31–24	.564	6th	2nd	2.0	1–1	.500	Won South Division Championship (Cape); Lost Western Conference Championship (Illinois Valley)	
2025	Patrick Morey	27–26	.509	8th	3rd	12.5	0–0	.000	Did not qualify	
2026	Patrick Morey	23–32	.418	16th	4th	22.0	0–0	.000	Did not qualify	
Totals		115–103	.528				2–2	.500		

== Roster ==
Thrillville Thrillbillies roster
Active roster	Coaching staff
Pitchers: 23 Aaron Akin; 21 Ross Aldridge; -- Drake Buffington; 28 Brady Coon; 38 Dax Dunnill; 33 Sam Foulke; 34 Evan Oakley; 18 Jayden Ohmer; 11 Seth Pitcock; 41 Max Powers; 6 Colton Rerick; 16 Trenton Roehler; 17 Jacob Ross; 27 Connar Temple; 14 Carter Woollums; 32 Klayton Wright; Utility players: 44 TJ Costello; Catchers: 26 Zach Pomatto; 25 Hayden Ralls; 9 Grant Sawa; Infielders: 31 Brayton Coomer; 10 Eduardo Letamendi; 5 Mason Pangborn; -- Roydan Perez; 4 Carson Shee; 22 Carter Walters; Outfielders: 8 Peyton Kight; 7 Christian Kiper; 2 Frederick Ragsdale III; 12 Devin Wassmann; -- Wyatt Wawro	Manager: -- Patrick Morey; Coaches: -- Travis Hope (assistant); Disabled list; ‡ Inactive list; § Suspended list; updated June 5, 2026
