= Springfield Capitals =

The Springfield Capitals were an independent baseball league team in Springfield, Illinois. The Capitals were members of the Frontier League from 1996 to 2001. The Capitals won the Frontier League championship in 1996 and in 1998.

After the 2001 season, the team moved to Rockford, Illinois, and became the Rockford Riverhawks.

== The Ballpark ==
The Capitals played at Robin Roberts Stadium at Lanphier Park. The park had a capacity of 5,200.

== Springfield Capitals (1963–1977) ==
The original Springfield Capitals baseball team played in Springfield from 1963 to 1977 in the Central Illinois Collegiate League. The team was disbanded when the New Orleans Pelicans relocated to Springfield to play as the Springfield Redbirds a Triple-A affiliate of the St. Louis Cardinals.
