= Clinton LumberKings =

American collegiate summer baseball team

- Founded in 1954; Clinton, Iowa
Team logo
Cap insignia

Minor league affiliations
- Class: Collegiate summer (2021–present)
- Previous classes: Class A (1963–2020); Class D (1954–1962)
- League: Prospect League (2021–present)
- Conference: Western Conference
- Division: Northwest Division
- Previous leagues: Midwest League (1956–2020); Mississippi–Ohio Valley League (1954–1955)

Major league affiliations
- Team: Unaffiliated (2021–present)
- Previous teams: Miami Marlins (2019–2020); Seattle Mariners (2009–2018); Texas Rangers (2003–2008); Montréal Expos (2001–2002); Cincinnati Reds (1999–2000); San Diego Padres (1995–1998); San Francisco Giants (1980–1994); Los Angeles Dodgers (1977–1979); Detroit & Chicago (AL)(co-op) (1976); Detroit Tigers (1971–1976); Seattle Pilots (1969); Milwaukee Brewers (1970); Pittsburgh Pirates (1966–1968, 1954–1958); Chicago White Sox (1959–1965, 1976)

Minor league titles
- League titles (2): 1963; 1991
- Division titles (7): 1991; 1993; 2010; 2016; 2019; 2021; 2025

Team data
- Name: Clinton LumberKings (1994–present)
- Previous names: Clinton Giants (1980–1993); Clinton Dodgers (1977–1979); Clinton Pilots (1966–1976); Clinton C-Sox (1960–1965); Clinton White Sox (1959); Clinton Pirates (1954–1958)
- Mascot: Louie the Lumberking
- Ballpark: NelsonCorp Field (1954–present)
- Owner/ Operator: Community owned
- General manager: Nate Vander Bleek
- Manager: Trevor Burkhart
- Website: lumberkings.com/landing/index

The Clinton LumberKings are a collegiate summer baseball team of the Prospect League. They are located in Clinton, Iowa, and play their home games at NelsonCorp Field. From 1956 to 2020, they were members of Minor League Baseball's Midwest League. With Major League Baseball's reorganization of the minor leagues after the 2020 season, Clinton was not selected to continue in affiliated baseball.

The LumberKings play in the Prospect League's Western Conference – Northwest Division along with the Burlington Bees, Illinois Valley Pistol Shrimp, Normal CornBelters, and Quincy Doggy Paddlers.

== Clinton baseball history ==
After beginning play in 1895, Clinton had sporadic teams in various leagues over the next few decades, as the Great Depression, World War I and World War II affected many baseball franchises. Clinton's teams have had several different major league affiliations: the Brooklyn Dodgers (1937–38), New York Giants (1939–41), Chicago Cubs (1947–49), Pirates (1954–58 and 1966–68), White Sox (1959–65), Pilots/Brewers (1969–70), Tigers (1971–75), Tigers/White Sox co-op (1976), Dodgers (1977–79), Giants (1980–94), Padres (1995–98), Reds (1999–2000), Expos (2001–02), and Rangers (2003–08), and Mariners (2009–18). In September 2018, they entered into a two-year player development contract with the Miami Marlins.

Aside from its time as the C-Sox (1960–65) and part of its time as the Pilots (1966–76), the team used the parent major league team's nickname before adopting the LumberKings name for the 1994 season.

The 2010 LumberKings season was the subject of the 2013 book "Class A: Baseball in the Middle of Everywhere" by Lucas Mann.

In 2016, led by first year manager Mitch Canham, the LumberKings won 86 games to set the mark for most in a regular season by any team in Clinton franchise history. The squad went on to sweep the Peoria Chiefs in the first round of the playoffs before defeating the Cedar Rapids Kernels in a thrilling three-game series. Game three of the Western Division final ended with a Ricky Eusebio walk off hit to win 1–0 in extra innings. The LumberKings would fall, however, in the Midwest League Championship in four games to the Great Lakes Loons.

In addition to playing host to the franchise record setting LumberKings (86-54), the LumberKings transformed their ballpark overnight following game two of the Midwest League Championship to become a football field. The LumberKings played host to Camanche High School Football in the inaugural "LumberBowl." Camanche hosted Williamsburg High School in the game on September 16, 2016. The Raiders of Williamsburg defeated the Indians 55–7.

Following the 2020 season, the LumberKings were cut from the Midwest League and affiliated baseball as part of Major League Baseball's reorganization of the minor leagues. They later joined the Prospect League, a collegiate summer baseball league, for 2021.

== NelsonCorp Field ==
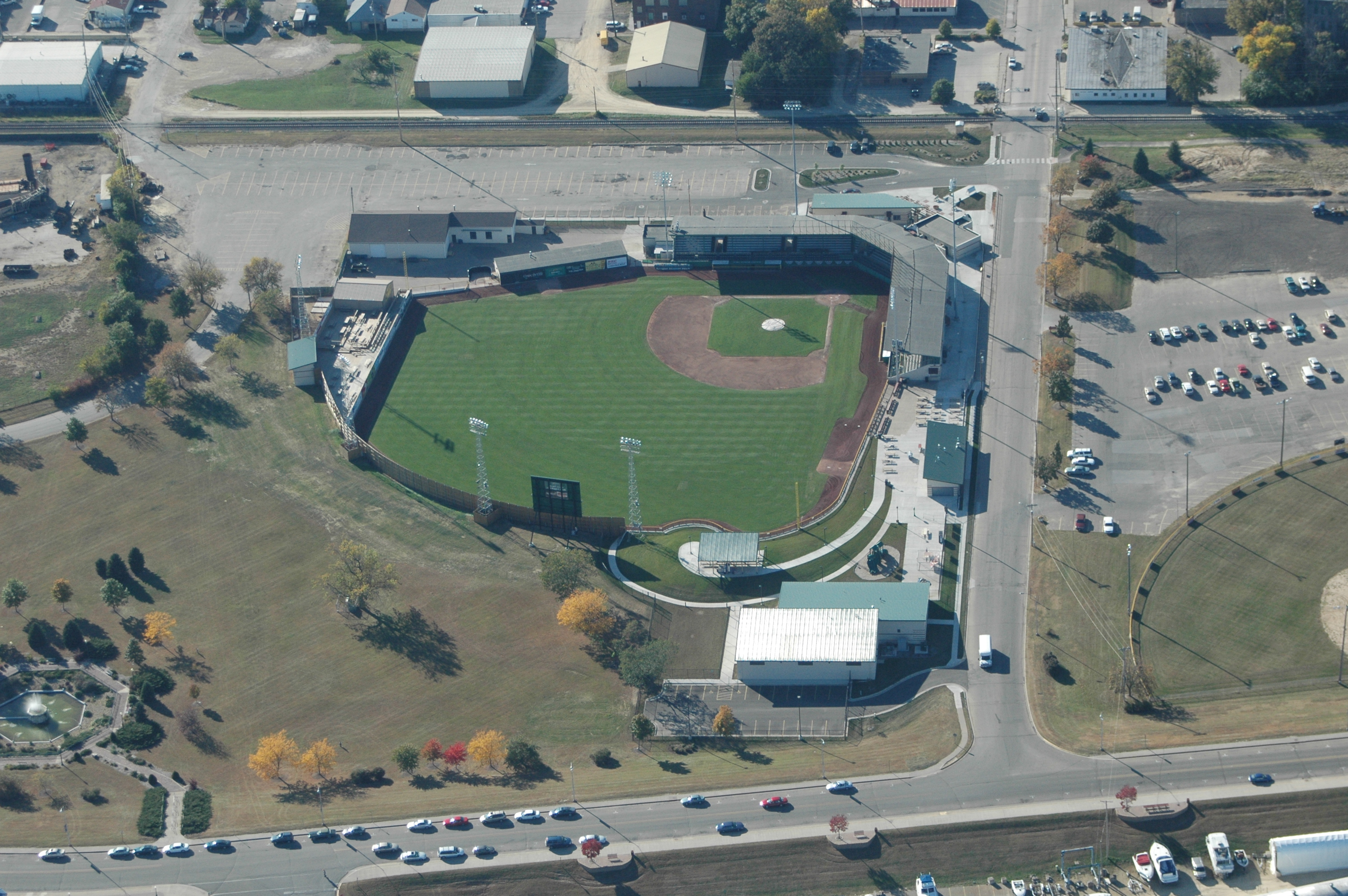
Ashford Field. Formerly Alliant Energy Field and Riverview Stadium

The home park for the LumberKings is NelsonCorp Field in Clinton, Iowa. The stadium was built in 1937 as a Works Progress Administration (WPA) project and named Riverview Stadium, due to its location on the banks of the Mississippi River. It was renamed Alliant Energy Field in 2002 and renovated in 2005–2006 to a capacity of 4,000. It was renamed to Ashford University Field in 2011 and NelsonCorp Field in 2019. The Dimensions are: LF – 330, CF – 401, RF – 325.

== No-hitters ==
Clinton has tossed 25 no-hitters. The list includes the following no-hitters:

Date	Pitcher(s)	Opponent	Score
August 20, 1957	Dick Lines	Decatur	6–0 (7 innings)
June 2, 1959	Thomas Fisher	Paris	1–0
June 19, 1960	Scott Seger	Quincy	3–0 (7 innings)
May 23, 1963	Bill Dawson	Fox Cities	10–0 (7 innings)
June 23, 1964	Norbert Rodgers	Quincy	2–0 (7 innings)
June 11, 1967	John Lamb	Quad City	3–0 (7 innings)
June 19, 1967	Joe Barnett	Quincy	2–0 (7 innings)
August 25, 1967	Bill Laxton	Waterloo	2–1 (7 innings)
August 7, 1970	John Conzatti	Quad Cities	2–0 (6 innings)
May 3, 1972	Larry Bracco	Waterloo	0–1 (7 innings)
May 15, 1978	Russell McDonald	Wausau	1–0 (7 innings)
July 16, 1978	Jim Nobles	Wisconsin Rapids	7–1 (7 innings)
June 4, 1980	Jerry Stovall	Wausau	2–0 (7 innings)
April 20, 1981	Greg Bangert	Burlington	4–1 (7 innings)
August 12, 1981	Mark Grant	Danville	9–0
May 9, 1983	Ramon Bautista	Appleton	2–0 (7 innings)
June 6, 1989	Chris Hancock, Chris Fye	Burlington	11–0
May 14, 1992	Chuck Wanke	Peoria	5–3
August 4, 1996	Jim Sak, Todd Bussa	Burlington	3–0
August 3, 2000	Scott Dunn	Lansing	7–0 (Perfect Game)
July 9, 2003	Domingo Valdez	Kane County	4–0 (7 innings - G2)
July 11, 2012	Jordan Shipers	West Michigan	10–0
July 17, 2013	Víctor Sánchez	Lansing	1–0
May 1, 2015	Daniel Missaki, Kody Kerski, Troy Scott	Cedar Rapids	1–0
August 9, 2016	Pedro Vasquez, Joey Strain, Lukas Schiraldi, Matt Walker	Beloit	2–0

== Playoffs ==
Clinton LumberKings of the Midwest League
Season	Quarterfinals	Semifinals	Finals
1987	–	L, 2–1, Springfield	–
1991	–	W, 2–0, Burlington	W, 3–0, Madison
1993	–	W, 2–0, Springfield	L, 3–1, South Bend
1998	W, 2–1, Quad Cities	L, 2–0, West Michigan	–
1999	L, 2–1, Burlington	–	–
2000	L, 2–1, Beloit	–	–
2003	W, 2–1, Kane County	L, 2–1, Beloit	–
2004	W, 2–0, Cedar Rapids	L, 2–0, Kane County	–
2005	W, 2–0, Quad Cities	L, 2–0, Wisconsin	–
2007	W, 2–1, Cedar Rapids	L, 2–0, Beloit	–
2008	L, 2–0, Cedar Rapids	–	–
2010	W, 2–1, Cedar Rapids	W, 2–1, Kane County	L, 3–2, Lake County
2011	L, 2–0, Quad Cities	–	–
2012	W, 2–1, Beloit	L, 2–0, Wisconsin	–
2013	L, 2–0, Beloit	–	–
2016	W, 2–0, Peoria	W, 2–1, Cedar Rapids	L, 3–1, Great Lakes
2019	W, 2–0, Kane County	W, 2–1, Cedar Rapids	L, 3–0, South Bend

Clinton LumberKings of the Prospect League
Season	Division Championship	Conference Championship	Prospect League Championship Series
2021	W, 4–3, Normal	L, 3–7, Cape	–
2023	L, 5–6, Quincy	–	–
2024	L, 3–0, Illinois Valley	–	–
2025	W, 3–2, Burlington	L, 1–3, Cape	–

== Roster ==
Clinton LumberKings roster
Active roster	Coaching staff
Pitchers: 24 Dylan Bergman; 47 Brayden Billingsley; 3 Kasey Clark; 17 Hunter Cook; 15 Conner Diiulio; 18 Chase Dykstra; 44 Nick Hartje; 39 Cooper Hathaway; 9 Jai Jensen; 50 Luke Kehrli; 36 Kirill Landry; 8 Gavin McCullough; 33 Drake Obermueller; 10 Chase Reeder; 2 Will Schufreider; 45 Jayson Sevier; 31 Cody Shaffer; 34 Miller Tavaglione; 16 Jaqson Tejeda; 25 Andrew Theiss; 46 Jackson Wohlers; Catchers: 41 Grant Ingram; 48 Chase McEwan; 12 Cal Parr; Infielders: 40 Gavin Awbrey; 26 Karson Grout; 1 Cole Lanclos; 6 Sutton Lewis; 14 Esteban Marin; 35 Jackson Mishler; 20 Danny Sanchez; 28 Carter Schueler; 4 Brody Shinkle; 29 Isaac Sobieszczyk; Outfielders: 23 Archer Ogbourne; 19 Ben Toft; 21 Jaylen Ziegler	Manager: -- Trevor Burkhart; Coaches: -- Mike Funke (pitching); -- Jalen Martinez (assistant); -- Tyler Monkman (assistant); Disabled list; ‡ Inactive list; § Suspended list; updated June 5, 2026

== Notable alumni ==
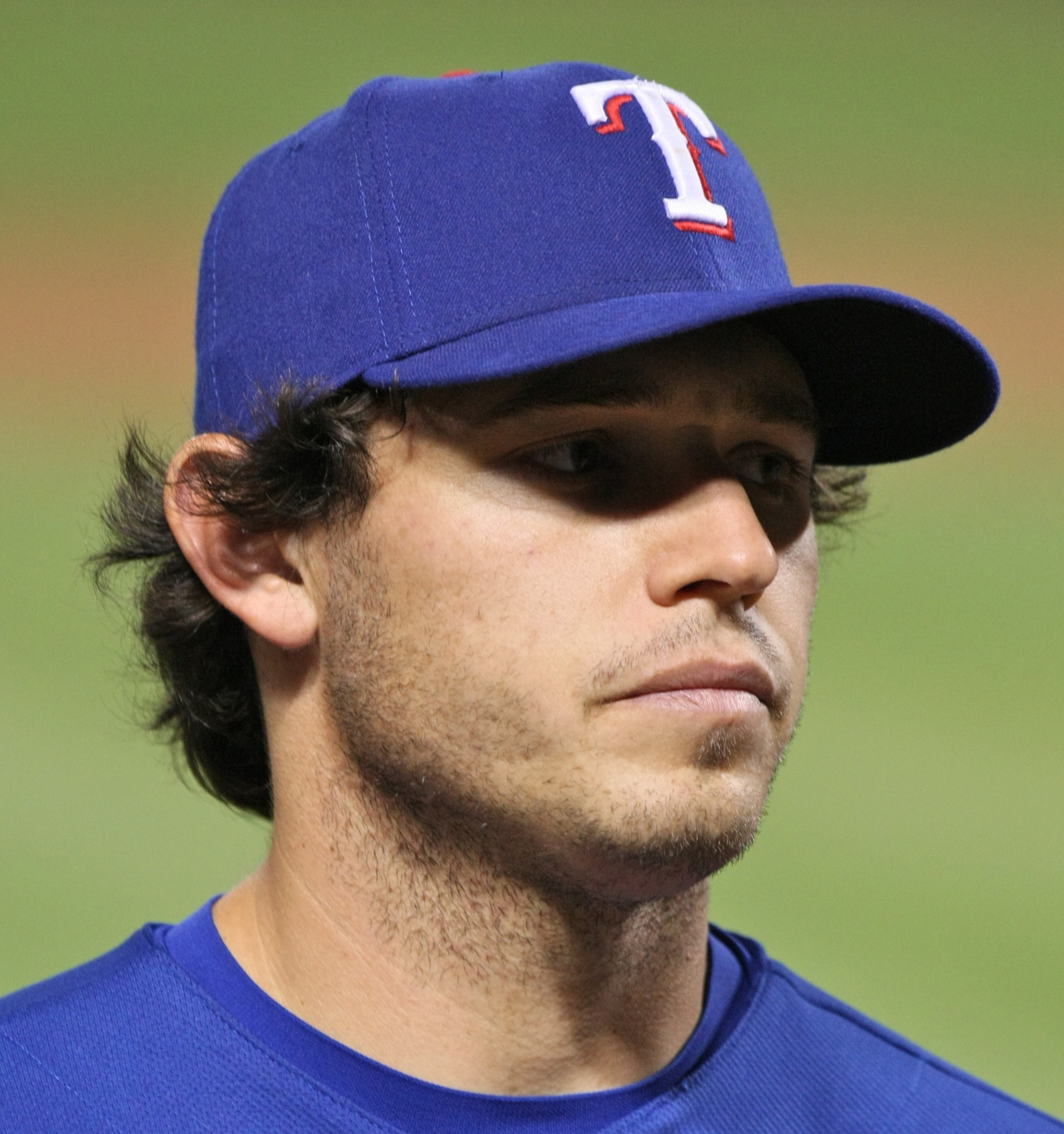
Ian Kinsler

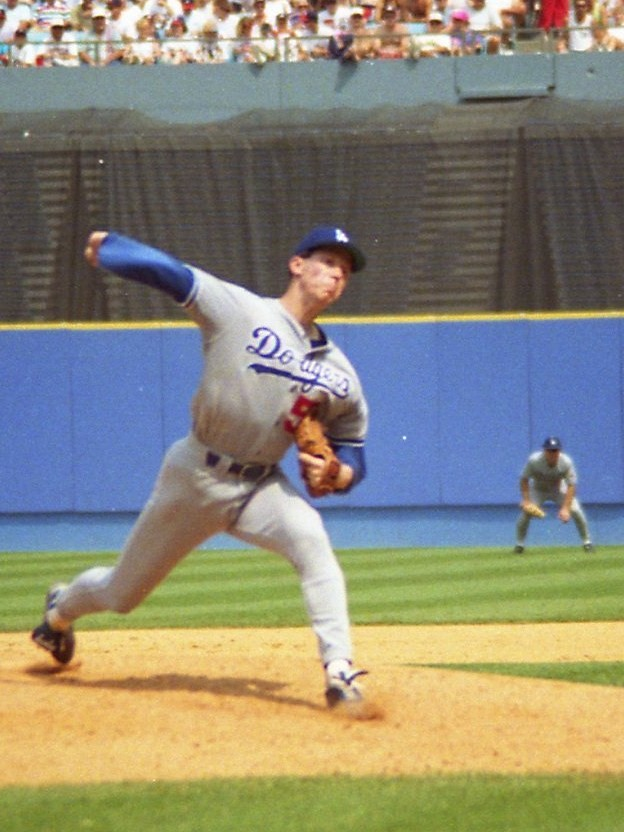
Orel Hershiser

- Chris Vallimont (2019)
- Alex Vesia (2019)
- George Soriano (2019)
- Sean Reynolds (2019)
- Kameron Misner (2019)
- Humberto Mejía (2019)
- Sean Guenther (2019)
- Jerar Encarnación (2019)
- José Devers (2019)
- Peyton Burdick (2019)
- Will Banfield (2019)
- Devin Sweet (2018)
- Tommy Romero (2018)
- Jack Larsen (2018)
- Ray Kerr (2018)
- Joey Gerber (2018)
- Grant Anderson (2018)
- JP Sears (2017)
- Luis Rengifo (2017)
- Ljay Newsome (2017)
- Wyatt Mills (2017)
- Seth Elledge (2017)
- Robert Dugger (2017)
- Art Warren (2016)
- Vinny Nittoli (2016)
- Nick Neidert (2016)
- Pablo López (2016)
- Jake Brentz (2016)
- Braden Bishop (2016)
- Luis Liberato (2015–2017)
- Osmer Morales (2015–2016)
- Zack Littell (2015–2016)
- Alex Jackson (2015–2016)
- Luiz Gohara (2015–2016)
- Ryan Yarbrough (2015)
- Erick Mejia (2015)
- Thyago Vieira (2014–2015)
- Jack Reinheimer (2014)
- Emilio Pagán (2014)
- Tyler O'Neill (2014)
- Ian Miller (2014)
- Paul Fry (2014)
- Edwin Díaz (2014)
- Tim Lopes (2013)
- Dominic Leone (2013)
- Patrick Kivlehan (2013)
- Gabriel Guerrero (2013)
- Ketel Marte (2012–2013)
- Chris Taylor (2012)
- Andrew Kittredge (2012)
- Mayckol Guaipe (2012)
- Ji-man Choi (2012)
- Jabari Blash (2011–2012)
- Taijuan Walker (2011) MLB All-Star
- Stefen Romero (2011)
- James Paxton (2011)
- Brad Miller (2011)
- John Hicks (2011)
- Roenis Elías (2011)
- Carter Capps (2011)
- Steven Baron (2010–2012)
- Brandon Maurer (2010–2011)
- Tom Wilhelmsen (2010)
- Erasmo Ramírez (2010)
- Stephen Pryor (2010)
- Yoervis Medina (2010)
- James Jones (2010)
- Nick Franklin (2010)
- Brandon Bantz (2010)
- Anthony Vasquez (2009–2010, 2013)
- Brian Moran (2009–2010)
- Kyle Seager (2009) MLB All-Star
- Bobby LaFromboise (2009)
- Maikel Cleto (2009)
- Justin Smoak (2008)
- Joe Ortiz (2008)
- Mitch Moreland (2008)
- Derek Holland (2008)
- Mark Hamburger (2008)
- Neftalí Feliz (2008): 2010 AL Rookie of the Year
- Cody Eppley (2008)
- Fabio Castillo (2008)
- Engel Beltré (2008)
- Blake Beavan (2008)
- Evan Reed (2007–2008)
- Josh Lueke (2007–2008)
- Scott Rice (2007)
- Manny Piña (2007)
- Mauro Gómez (2007)
- Craig Gentry (2007)
- Michael Kirkman (2006–2008)
- John Mayberry Jr. (2006)
- Zach Phillips (2005–2007)
- Eric Hurley (2005)
- Tug Hulett (2005)
- Brandon Boggs (2005)
- Cody Clark (2004–2005)
- Edinson Vólquez (2004) MLB All-Star
- Ian Kinsler (2004) 4x MLB All-Star
- Thomas Diamond (2004)
- John Danks (2004)
- Jesse Chavez (2004)
- Kevin Richardson (2003–2005)
- Josh Rupe (2003)
- Nick Masset (2003)
- Kameron Loe (2003)
- Omar Beltré (2003)
- Grady Sizemore (2001) 3x MLB All-Star
- Jason Bay (2001): 2004 NL Rookie of the Year
- Ben Broussard (1999)
- Matt Clement (1996) MLB All-Star
- Gary Matthews, Jr. (1995) MLB All-Star
- Bob Howry (1994)
- Mike Myers (1991–92)
- Salomón Torres (1991)
- Steve Reed (1989)
- Royce Clayton (1989) MLB All-Star
- Rod Beck (1988) 3x MLB All-Star
- Mike Remlinger (1987) MLB All-Star
- Matt Williams (1986) 4x GG; 5x MLB All-Star; 1994 NL Home Run Leader
- Dennis Cook (1985)
- Charlie Hayes (1984)
- John Burkett (1984) 2x MLB All-Star; 1993 NL Wins Leader
- Matt Nokes (1982) MLB All-Star
- Rob Deer (1980)
- Chris Brown (1980) MLB All-Star
- Scott Garrelts (1980) MLB All-Star; 1989 NL ERA Leader
- Orel Hershiser (1979): NLCS MVP (1988), WS MVP (1988), NL Cy Young Award (1988)
- Candy Maldonado (1979)
- Steve Sax (1979) 1982 NL Rookie of the Year
- Mitch Webster (1978–79)
- Ron Kittle (1977): 1983 AL Rookie of the Year
- Mike Scioscia (1977) 2x MLB All-Star; Manager: 2002 World Series Champion – California Angels
- Mickey Hatcher (1977)
- Dave Stewart (1977) MLB All-Star; 1987 AL Wins Leader; 1989 World Series MVP
- Dave Rozema (1975)
- Ron LeFlore (1973) MLB All-Star; 2x AL Stolen Base Leader (1978, 1980)
- Jim Leyland (MGR 1972–73) Manager: 1997 World Series Champion – Florida Marlins, Baseball Hall Of Fame Inductee
- Bill Travers (1970) MLB All-Star
- Gorman Thomas (1970) MLB All-Star; 2x AL Home Run Leader (1979,1982)
- Darrell Porter (1970) 4x MLB All-Star; 1982 World Series MVP
- Tom Kelly (1969) Manager: 2x World Series Champion (1987,1991) – Minnesota Twins
- Jim Slaton (1969) MLB All-Star
- Frank Taveras (1968) 1977 NL Stolen Base Leader
- Don Money (1966) 4 x MLB All-Star
- Denny McLain (1962): 2x AL Cy Young Award (1968–1969), AL Most Valuable Player (1968)
- Ken Berry (1961) 2x GG; MLB All-Star
- Tommy McCraw (1960)
- Gerry Arrigo (1960) MLB All-Star
- Al McBean (1958)
- Lou Johnson (1955)
- Dean Stone (1949) MLB All-Star
- Sid Gordon (1939–40), 2x MLB All-Star
- Bing Miller (1914, 1916–17)
