= Quincy Gems =

American collegiate summer baseball team

- Logo

Information
- League: Prospect League
- Location: Quincy, Illinois
- Ballpark: Quincy Stadium
- Founded: 1996
- Disbanded: 2023
- League championships: 6 (1996, 1998, 2005, 2009, 2011, 2014)
- Division championships: 10 (1998, 1999, 2009, 2010, 2011, 2013, 2014, 2016, 2022, 2023)
- Former name: Quincy Gems (1996–2023)
- Former league: Central Illinois Collegiate League (1996–2008)
- Ownership: Jimmie & Julie Louthan
- Management: Jacob Hollensteiner (GM) & Andie Belme (AGM)
- Media: Quincy Herald Whig, WGEM, KRRY
- Website: quincygems.com

The Quincy Gems were a collegiate summer league baseball team located in Quincy, Illinois.

The Gems were originally a part of the Central Illinois Collegiate League and joined the Prospect League with several other CICL teams prior to the 2009 season. The team's original owners, the Quincy Civic Center Authority, sold the Gems to its current owners in September 2014 for $120,000.

On August 29, 2023, the team announced that they would not return for the 2024 season and will seek relocation

The franchise was later sold & relocated to Hendersonville, Tennessee and rebranded as the Full Count Rhythm, playing its home game at Drakes Creek Park The Gems will be replaced in Quincy by an expansion team set to begin play for the 2025 Prospect League season

== Stadium ==
The Gems played at QU Stadium, a 2,500 seat facility owned and operated by Quincy University. The facility was built in 1938 and is located at 1800 Sycamore Street in Quincy.

== Seasons ==
Season	Manager	Record	Win %	Division	GB	Post-season record	Post-season win %	Post-season result	Notes
2009	Chris Martin	36–20	.643	1st	–	2–0	1.000	Won Prospect League Championship (Chillicothe)	
2010	Chris Martin	29–24	.547	2nd	5.5	1–1	.500	Won West Division Championship (Springfield); Lost Semifinals (Danville)	
2011	Chris Martin	38–18	.679	1st	–	2–0	1.000	Won West Division Championship (Terre Haute); Won Prospect League Championship (West Virginia)	
2012	Chris Martin	34–26	.567	3rd	4.0	0–0	.000	Did not qualify	
2013	Chris Martin	34–25	.576	2nd	6.5	2–2	.500	Won West Division Championship (Danville); Lost Prospect League Championship (West Virginia)	
2014	Chris Martin	39–20	.661	1st	–	4–2	.667	Won West Division Championship (Danville); Won Prospect League Championship (Chillicothe)	
2015	Chris Martin	27–33	.450	5th	16.0	0–0	.000	Did not qualify	
2016	Zach Getsee	27–33	.450	5th	12.5	2–2	.500	Won West Division Championship (Springfield); Lost Prospect League Championship (West Virginia)	Made playoffs as a result of 1st Half division title
2017	Adam Hightower and Rick Fraire	21–39	.350	5th	15.0	0–0	.000	Did not qualify	Hightower and Fraire were co-managers
2018	Rick Fraire	33–27	.550	3rd	3.0	0–0	.000	Did not qualify	
2019	Pat Robles	34–26	.567	3rd	9.0	0–0	.000	Did not qualify	
2020	Season cancelled (COVID-19 pandemic)								
2021	Justin Paulsen	27–32	.458	4th	3.5	0–0	.000	Did not qualify	
2022	Brad Gyorkos	31–29	.517	2nd	0.5	1–1	.500	Won Great Rivers Division Championship (Normal); Lost Western Conference Championship (Alton)	
2023	Brad Gyorkos	31–26	.544	2nd	1.5	3–2	.526	Won Great River Division Championship (Clinton); Won Western Conference Championship (Thrillville); Lost Prospect League Championship (Chillicothe)	
Totals		441–378	.538			17–10	.630		

== Notable alumni ==
- Sam Coonrod (2012)
- Adam Rosales (2003–2004)
- Joe Thatcher (2002)
- Bryan Bullington (2000)
- Dan Meyer (2000)
- Neal Cotts (1999–2000)
- Josh Rabe (1998–1999)
- J. J. Furmaniak (1998–1999)
