= DuPage Drones =

US summer collegiate baseball team

DuPage Drones (2015-2016)
- Logo

Information
- League: Prospect League (West Division)
- Location: Lisle, Illinois
- Ballpark: Village of Lisle-Benedictine University Sports Complex
- Founded: 2015
- Colors: Red, black, light gray, white
- Manager: Joe Lincoln
- Website: dronesbaseball.com

The DuPage Drones were a summer collegiate baseball team based in Lisle, Illinois. They were a member of the summer collegiate Prospect League. The Drones played at the Village of Lisle-Benedictine University Sports Complex at Benedictine University.
