= Central Illinois Collegiate League =

College summer baseball league

- CICL logo
- Sport: Baseball
- Founded: 1963
- Folded: 2008
- Motto: Real Wood
- No. of teams: 5 in final season
- Country: United States
- Last champion: Springfield Sliders
- Website: Official website

The Central Illinois Collegiate League (CICL) was a collegiate wooden bat summer baseball league. It was composed of five teams from Illinois and Indiana. The CICL was founded in 1963 as a charter member of National Collegiate Athletic Association certified summer baseball. Although the NCAA dropped Summer baseball program in 2005, The CICL is one of ten summer collegiate baseball leagues affiliated with the National Association of Summer Collegiate Baseball (NASCB), which now takes over the duties of the NCAA and follows all NCAA requirements. The league was also is one of four summer college baseball leagues supported by Major League Baseball.

The Springfield Sliders ran away with the CICL's final Championship Title. The Sliders won the First Half, Regular Season and Playoff Championship. The 2008 season was the inaugural season for the Sliders and the final season of the CICL.

On November 11, 2008, the CICL announced it was merging with the Prospect League.

== All-Time teams list ==
- Bloomington Bobcats (1963–79)
- Bluff City Bombers (Alton, Illinois) (1998–2004)
- Champaign County Colts (1990–96)
- Champaign-Urbana Colts (1963–64)
- Charleston-Mattoon Twins (1972–79)
- Danville Dans (1980–81, 1989–2008)
- Danville Highlanders (1988)
- Decatur Blues (1986–2003)
- Dubois County Bombers (Huntingburg, Indiana) (2005–08)
- DuPage Dragons (2005–08)
- East Peoria Scrappers (2005)
- Fairview Heights Mets (1987–94)
- Galesburg Pioneers (1963–82, 2004–06)
- Jacksonville Bullets (1986)
- Lincoln Collegians (1963–68, 1988–90)
- Macomb Macs (1969–74)
- Metro Miners (Edwardsville, Illinois) (1985)
- Peoria Collegians (1963-64)
- Peoria Pacers (1966–84)
- Quincy Gems (1997–2008)
- Quincy Rivermen (1974–88)
- Springfield Capitals (1963–77)
- Springfield Rifles (1983–2006)
- Springfield Sliders (2008)
- Twin City Stars (Normal, Illinois) (1982–2006)

The Hannibal Cavemen were set to join the CICL for the 2009 season, but joined the Prospect League along with the rest of the CICL roster.

== Notable alumni ==
This is a list of some players that played in the Central Illinois Collegiate League:

=== Baseball Hall of Fame alumni ===
- Kirby Puckett
- Mike Schmidt

=== Notable alumni ===
- Bob Brenly
- Neal Cotts
- Joe Girardi
- Ryan Howard
- Roger McDowell
- Keith Moreland
- Joe Niekro
- Jon Papelbon
- Jack Perconte
- Dan Quisenberry
- Rick Reuschel
- Sam Ewing

A list of all players that have made appearances on major league ballclubs can be accessed on the CICL website.
