= List of U.S. baseball stadiums by capacity =

This is a list of most current US baseball stadiums. They are ordered by seating capacity, the maximum number of spectators the stadium can accommodate in baseball configuration. Venues with a capacity of at least 10,000 are included.

== Capacity of at least 10,000 ==
#	Stadium	Capacity	City	State	Home team(s)	League(s)	Image
1	Dodger Stadium	56,000	Los Angeles	California	Los Angeles Dodgers	National League (MLB)	
2	Chase Field	48,330	Phoenix	Arizona	Arizona Diamondbacks	National League (MLB)	
3	T-Mobile Park	47,368	Seattle	Washington	Seattle Mariners	American League (MLB)	
4	Coors Field	46,897	Denver	Colorado	Colorado Rockies	National League (MLB)	
5	Yankee Stadium	46,537	New York City	New York	New York Yankees	American League (MLB)	
6	Angel Stadium	45,517	Anaheim	California	Los Angeles Angels	American League (MLB)	
7	Oriole Park at Camden Yards	44,487	Baltimore	Maryland	Baltimore Orioles	American League (MLB)	
8	Busch Stadium	44,383	St. Louis	Missouri	St. Louis Cardinals	National League (MLB)	
9	Great American Ball Park	43,500	Cincinnati	Ohio	Cincinnati Reds	National League (MLB)	
10	Citizens Bank Park	42,901	Philadelphia	Pennsylvania	Philadelphia Phillies	National League (MLB)	
11	Tropicana Field	42,735 (Note: Capacity reduced to 25,025 for most Rays games.)	St. Petersburg	Florida	Tampa Bay Rays	American League (MLB)	
12	Citi Field	41,922	New York City	New York	New York Mets	National League (MLB)	
13	American Family Field	41,900	Milwaukee	Wisconsin	Milwaukee Brewers	National League (MLB)	
14	Wrigley Field	41,649	Chicago	Illinois	Chicago Cubs	National League (MLB)	
15	Nationals Park	41,373	Washington	District of Columbia	Washington Nationals	National League (MLB)	
16	Oracle Park	41,331	San Francisco	California	San Francisco Giants	National League (MLB)	
17	Daikin Park	41,168	Houston	Texas	Houston Astros	American League (MLB)	
18	Truist Park	41,084	Cumberland	Georgia	Atlanta Braves	National League (MLB)	
19	Comerica Park	41,083	Detroit	Michigan	Detroit Tigers	American League (MLB)	
20	Rate Field	40,615	Chicago	Illinois	Chicago White Sox	American League (MLB)	
21	Globe Life Field	40,300	Arlington	Texas	Texas Rangers	American League (MLB)	
22	Petco Park	39,860	San Diego	California	San Diego Padres	National League (MLB)	
23	PNC Park	38,747	Pittsburgh	Pennsylvania	Pittsburgh Pirates	National League (MLB)	
24	Target Field	38,544	Minneapolis	Minnesota	Minnesota Twins	American League (MLB)	
25	Kauffman Stadium	37,903	Kansas City	Missouri	Kansas City Royals	American League (MLB)	
26	Fenway Park	37,755	Boston	Massachusetts	Boston Red Sox	American League (MLB)	
27	LoanDepot Park	37,000	Miami	Florida	Miami Marlins	National League (MLB)	
28	Progressive Field	34,820	Cleveland	Ohio	Cleveland Guardians	American League (MLB)	
29	Charles Schwab Field Omaha	24,505	Omaha	Nebraska	Creighton Bluejays; College World Series	Big East Conference (NCAA)	
30	Hiram Bithorn Stadium	18,264	San Juan	Puerto Rico	Santurce Crabbers	Liga de Béisbol Profesional Roberto Clemente	
31	Sahlen Field	16,600	Buffalo	New York	Buffalo Bisons	International League	
32	Dudy Noble Field	15,000	Starkville	Mississippi	Mississippi State Bulldogs	Southeastern Conference (NCAA)	
33	Sloan Park	15,000	Mesa	Arizona	Arizona League Cubs; Chicago Cubs (Spring training); Mesa Solar Sox	Arizona League; Cactus League; Arizona Fall League	
34	Innovative Field	13,500	Rochester	New York	Rochester Red Wings	International League	
35	Louisville Slugger Field	13,131	Louisville	Kentucky	Louisville Bats	International League	
36	HoHoKam Park	12,623	Mesa	Arizona	Mesa Solar Sox; Oakland Athletics (Spring training)	Arizona Fall League; Cactus League	
37	Peoria Sports Complex	12,518	Peoria	Arizona	Arizona League Mariners; Arizona League Padres; Peoria Javelinas; Peoria Saguaros; San Diego Padres (Spring training); Seattle Mariners (Spring training)	Arizona League; Arizona League; Arizona Fall League; Arizona Fall League; Cactus League; Cactus League	
38	Victory Field	12,230	Indianapolis	Indiana	Indianapolis Indians	International League	
39	Riverfront Stadium	12,000	Wichita	Kansas	Wichita Wind Surge	Texas League	
40	Scottsdale Stadium	12,000	Scottsdale	Arizona	Arizona League Giants; San Francisco Giants (Spring training); Scottsdale Scorpions	Arizona League; Cactus League; Arizona Fall League	
41	Harbor Park	11,856	Norfolk	Virginia	Norfolk Tides	International League	
42	Dell Diamond	11,631	Round Rock	Texas	Round Rock Express	Pacific Coast League	
43	Principal Park	11,500	Des Moines	Iowa	Iowa Cubs	International League	
44	Isotopes Park	11,124	Albuquerque	New Mexico	Albuquerque Isotopes	Pacific Coast League	
45	VyStar Ballpark	11,000	Jacksonville	Florida	Jacksonville Jumbo Shrimp	International League	
46	Kino Veterans Memorial Stadium	11,000	Tucson	Arizona	Tucson Saguaros	Pecos League	
47	Salt River Fields at Talking Stick	11,000	Scottsdale	Arizona	Arizona Diamondbacks (Spring training); Arizona League Diamondbacks; Colorado Rockies (Spring training); Salt River Rafters	Cactus League; Arizona League; Cactus League; Arizona Fall League	
48	Northwestern Medicine Field	10,923	Geneva	Illinois	Kane County Cougars	American Association of Professional Baseball	
49	JetBlue Park at Fenway South	10,823	Fort Myers	Florida	Boston Red Sox (Spring training); Gulf Coast League Red Sox	Grapefruit League; Gulf Coast League	
50	NBT Bank Stadium	10,815	Syracuse	New York	Syracuse Mets	International League	
51	Baum–Walker Stadium	10,737	Fayetteville	Arkansas	Arkansas Razorbacks	Southeastern Conference (NCAA)	
52	Chukchansi Park	10,650	Fresno	California	Fresno Grizzlies	California League	
53	Sutter Health Park	10,624	West Sacramento	California	Sacramento River Cats; Athletics	Pacific Coast League; American League	
54	Isidoro García Stadium	10,500	Mayagüez	Puerto Rico	Mayagüez Indians	Liga de Béisbol Profesional Roberto Clemente	
55	Surprise Stadium	10,500	Surprise	Arizona	Arizona League Royals; Kansas City Royals (Spring training); Surprise Rafters; Texas Rangers (Spring training)	Arizona League; Cactus League; Arizona Fall League; Cactus League	
56	Route 66 Stadium	10,486	Springfield	Missouri	Springfield Cardinals; Missouri State Bears	Texas League; Missouri Valley Conference (NCAA)	
57	Coolray Field	10,427	Lawrenceville	Georgia	Gwinnett Stripers	International League	
58	Swayze Field	10,323	Oxford	Mississippi	Ole Miss Rebels	Southeastern Conference (NCAA)	
59	Alex Box Stadium - Skip Bertman Field	10,326	Baton Rouge	Louisiana	LSU Tigers	Southeastern Conference (NCAA	
60	Riders Field	10,216	Frisco	Texas	Frisco RoughRiders	Texas League	
61	Truist Field	10,200	Charlotte	North Carolina	Charlotte Knights	International League	
62	Coca-Cola Park	10,178	Allentown	Pennsylvania	Lehigh Valley IronPigs	International League	
63	Huntington Park	10,100	Columbus	Ohio	Columbus Clippers	International League	
64	American Family Fields of Phoenix	10,000	Phoenix	Arizona	Arizona League Brewers; Milwaukee Brewers (Spring training)	Arizona League; Cactus League	
65	AutoZone Park	10,000	Memphis	Tennessee	Memphis Redbirds	International League	
66	Camelback Ranch	10,000	Glendale	Arizona	Arizona League Dodgers; Arizona League White Sox; Chicago White Sox (Spring training); Glendale Desert Dogs; Los Angeles Dodgers (Spring training)	Arizona League; Arizona League; Cactus League; Arizona Fall League; Cactus League	
67	Durham Bulls Athletic Park	10,000	Durham	North Carolina	Durham Bulls; Duke Blue Devils	International League; Atlantic Coast Conference (NCAA)	
68	First Horizon Park	10,000	Nashville	Tennessee	Nashville Sounds	International League	
69	FirstEnergy Stadium	10,000	Reading	Pennsylvania	Reading Phillies	Eastern League	
70	Gold Mine on Airline	10,000	Metairie	Louisiana	None	None	
71	Howard J. Lamade Stadium	10,000	South Williamsport	Pennsylvania	Little League World Series	Little League Baseball	
72	Las Vegas Ballpark	10,000	Las Vegas	Nevada	Las Vegas Aviators	Pacific Coast League	
73	PNC Field	10,000	Moosic	Pennsylvania	Scranton/Wilkes-Barre Highlanders	International League	
74	Prince George's Stadium	10,000	Bowie	Maryland	Bowie Baysox	Eastern League	
75	Suplizio Field	10,000	Grand Junction	Colorado	NJCAA World Series; Grand Junction Razorback Suckers	NJCAA; Pecos League	
76	George M. Steinbrenner Field	10,000	Tampa	Florida	New York Yankees; Tampa Tarpons	Grapefruit League (Spring Training); Florida State League	
77	Goodyear Ballpark	10,000	Goodyear	Arizona	Cincinnati Reds (Spring training); Cleveland Guardians(Spring training); Arizona League Guardians; Arizona League Reds	Cactus League; Cactus League; Arizona League; Arizona League	
78	Fifth Third Field	10,000	Toledo	Ohio	Toledo Mud Hens	International League	
79	LMCU Ballpark	10,000	Comstock Park	Michigan	West Michigan Whitecaps	Midwest League	
80	Classic Auto Group Park	10,000	Eastlake	Ohio	Lake County Captains	Midwest League	
81	CarMax Park	10,000	Richmond	Virginia	Richmond Flying Squirrels; VCU Rams	Eastern League; Atlantic 10 Conference	

== Below 10,000 capacity ==
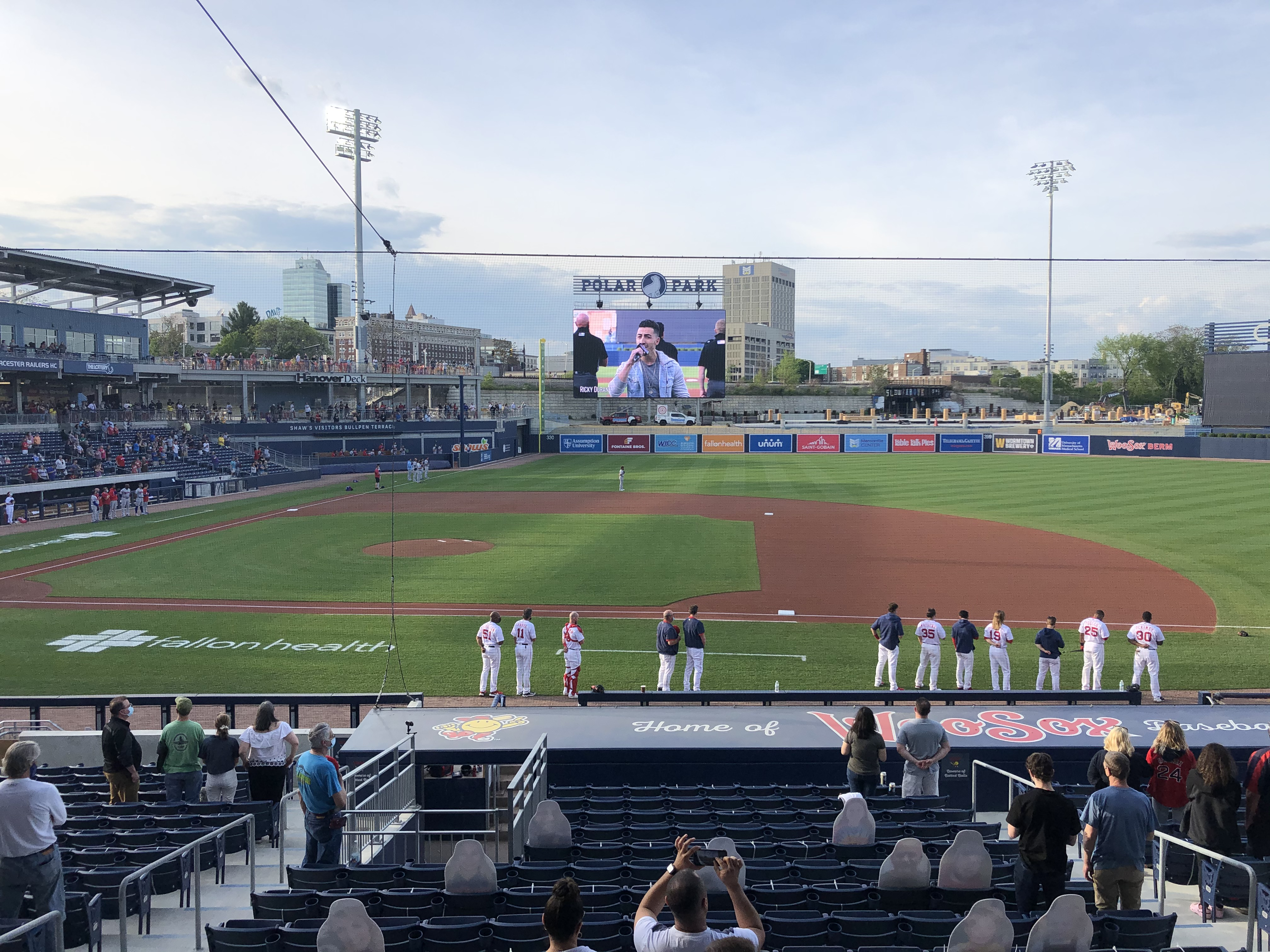
Polar Park

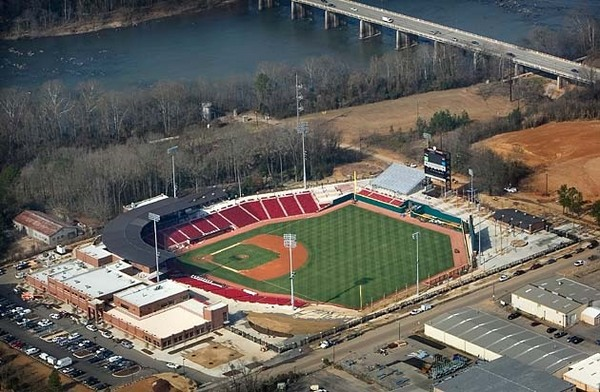
Founders Park

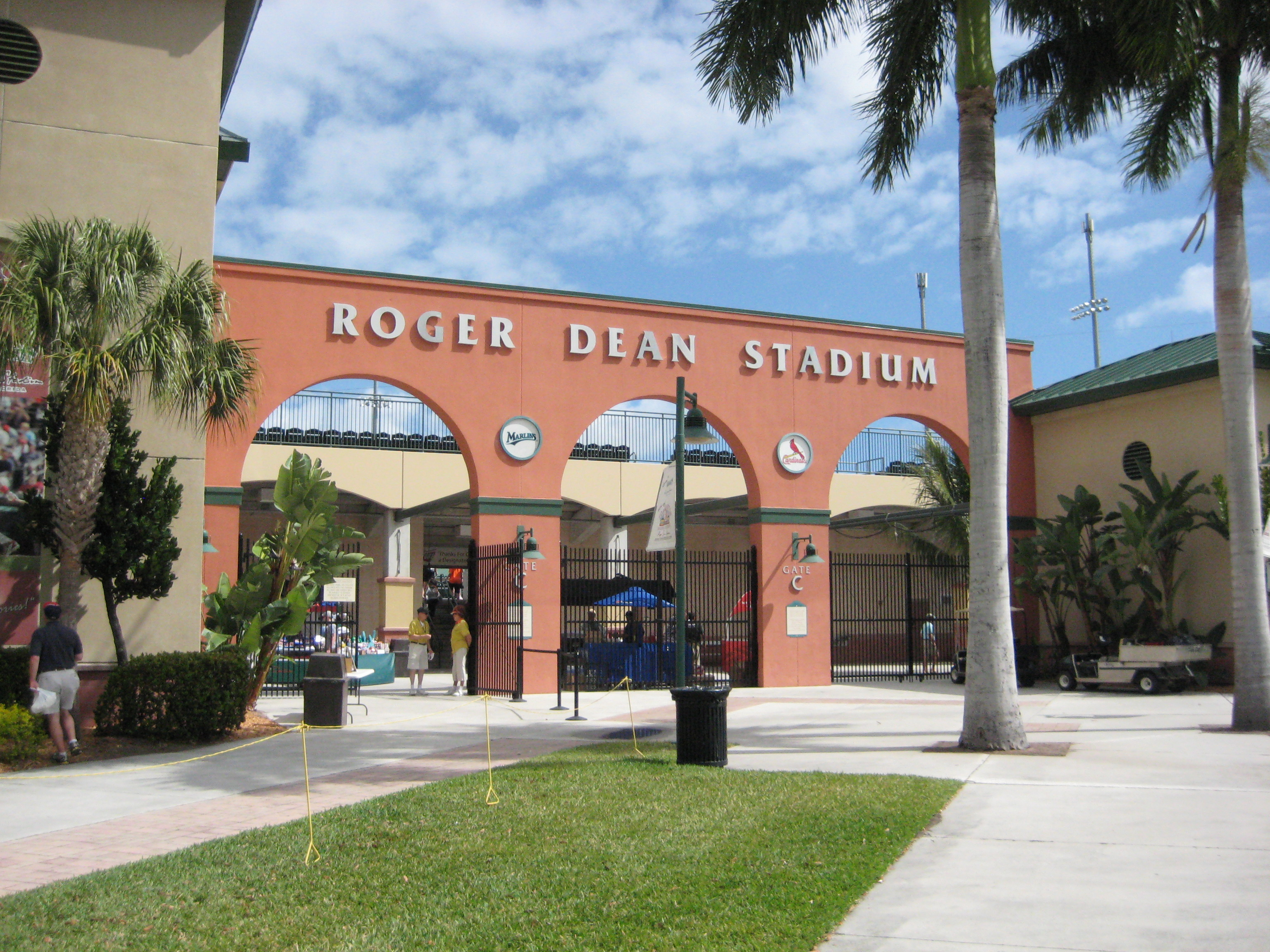
Roger Dean Stadium

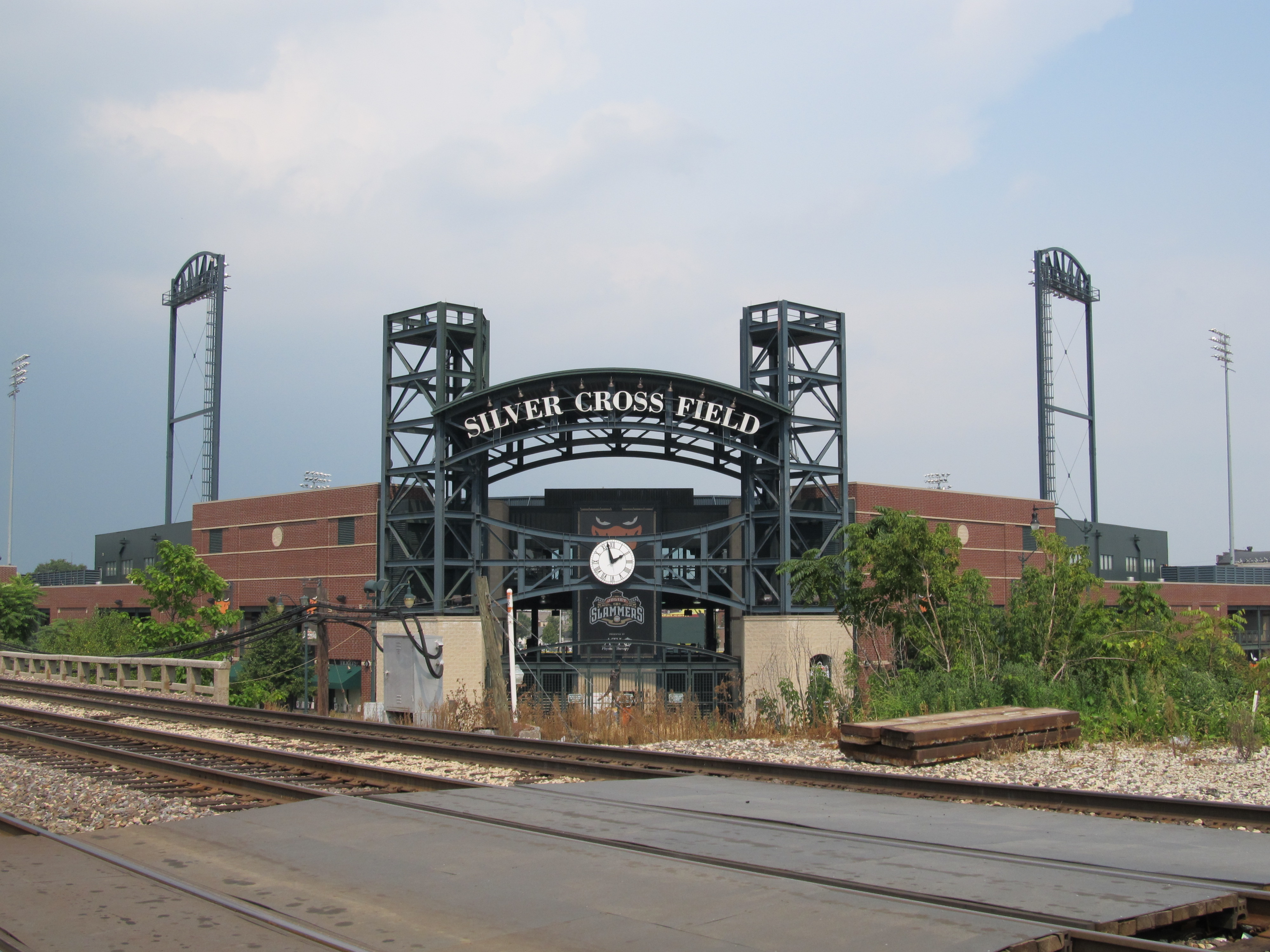
Duly Health and Care Field

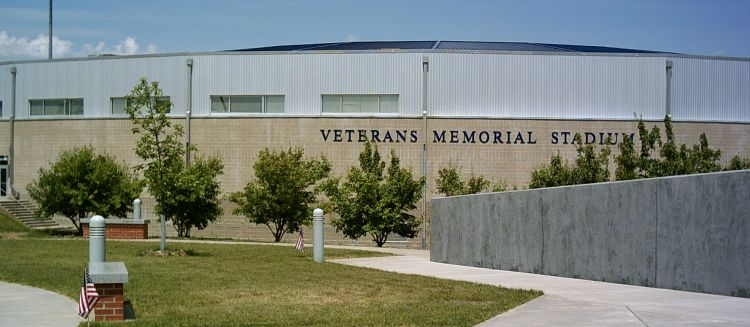
Veterans Memorial Stadium

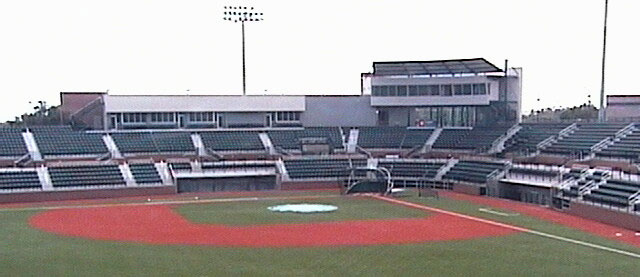
Turchin Stadium

#	Stadium	Capacity	City	State	Home team(s)	League(s)
81	ShoreTown Ballpark	9,588	Lakewood	New Jersey	Jersey Shore BlueClaws	South Atlantic League
82	Tempe Diablo Stadium	9,558	Tempe	Arizona	Arizona League Angels; Los Angeles Angels (Spring training)	Arizona League; Cactus League
83	Polar Park	9,508	Worcester	Massachusetts	Worcester Red Sox	International League
84	Champion Stadium	9,500	Lake Buena Vista	Florida	None	None
85	Hi Corbett Field	9,500	Tucson	Arizona	Arizona Wildcats	Big 12 Conference (NCAA)
86	Southwest University Park	9,500	El Paso	Texas	El Paso Chihuahuas	Pacific Coast League
87	Jackson Field	9,500	Lansing	Michigan	Lansing Lugnuts	Midwest League
88	Hammond Stadium	9,300	Fort Myers	Florida	Fort Myers Miracle; Gulf Coast League Twins; Minnesota Twins (Spring training)	Florida State League; Gulf Coast League; Grapefruit League
89	Wolff Stadium	9,200	San Antonio	Texas	San Antonio Missions	Texas League
90	Prisma Health Park	9,077	Columbia	South Carolina	Columbia Fireflies	Carolina League
91	Werner Park	9,023	Papillion	Nebraska	Omaha Storm Chasers	International League
92	Greater Nevada Field	9,013	Reno	Nevada	Reno Aces	Pacific Coast League
93	Phoenix Municipal Stadium	8,775	Phoenix	Arizona	Arizona State Sun Devils	Big 12 Conference (NCAA)
94	BayCare Ballpark	8,500	Clearwater	Florida	Clearwater Threshers; Philadelphia Phillies (Spring training)	Florida State League; Grapefruit League
95	Chickasaw Bricktown Ballpark	8,500	Oklahoma City	Oklahoma	Oklahoma City Comets	Pacific Coast League
96	Dozer Park	8,500	Peoria	Illinois	Bradley Braves; Peoria Chiefs	Missouri Valley Conference (NCAA); Midwest League
97	Ed Smith Stadium	8,500	Sarasota	Florida	Gulf Coast League Orioles; Baltimore Orioles (Spring training)	Gulf Coast League; Grapefruit League
98	Haymarket Park	8,500	Lincoln	Nebraska	Lincoln Saltdogs; Nebraska Cornhuskers	American Association of Professional Baseball; Big Ten Conference (NCAA)
99	Joker Marchant Stadium	8,500	Lakeland	Florida	Detroit Tigers (Spring training); Gulf Coast League Tigers; Lakeland Flying Tigers	Grapefruit League; Gulf Coast League; Florida State League
100	LECOM Park	8,500	Bradenton	Florida	Bradenton Marauders; Pittsburgh Pirates (Spring training)	Florida State League; Grapefruit League
101	Regions Field	8,500	Birmingham	Alabama	Birmingham Barons	Southern League
102	Sewell–Thomas Stadium	8,500	Tuscaloosa	Alabama	Alabama Crimson Tide	Southeastern Conference (NCAA)
103	TD Ballpark	8,500	Dunedin	Florida	Dunedin Blue Jays; Toronto Blue Jays (Spring training)	Florida State League; Grapefruit League
104	blocktickets PARK	8,500	Colorado Springs	Colorado	TBD	TBD
105	Trustmark Park	8,480	Pearl	Mississippi	Mississippi Mud Monsters; Belhaven Blazers	Frontier League; Collegiate Conference of the South (NCAA)
106	Founders Park	8,242	Columbia	South Carolina	South Carolina Gamecocks	Southeastern Conference (NCAA)
107	Day Air Ballpark	8,200	Dayton	Ohio	Dayton Dragons	Midwest League
108	Eck Stadium	8,153	Wichita	Kansas	Wichita State Shockers	American Conference (NCAA)
109	Parkview Field	8,100	Fort Wayne	Indiana	Fort Wayne TinCaps	Midwest League
110	USSSA Space Coast Complex	8,100	Viera	Florida	None	USSSA
111	Erlanger Park	8,032	Chattanooga	Tennessee	Chattanooga Lookouts	Southern League
112	Lindsey Nelson Stadium	8,012	Knoxville	Tennessee	Tennessee Volunteers	Southeastern Conference (NCAA)
113	City of Palms Park	8,000	Fort Myers	Florida	Florida SouthWestern State Bucs	Suncoast Conference (NJCAA)
114	CoolToday Park	8,000	North Port	Florida	Atlanta Braves (Spring training); Gulf Coast League Braves	Grapefruit League; Gulf Coast League
115	O'Brate Stadium	8,000	Stillwater	Oklahoma	Oklahoma State Cowboys	Big 12 Conference (NCAA)
116	San Manuel Stadium	8,000	San Bernardino	California	Inland Empire 66ers of San Bernardino	California League
117	Veterans Field	8,000	Chatham	Massachusetts	Chatham Anglers	Cape Cod Baseball League
118	The Ballpark at America First Square	8,000	South Jordan	Utah	Salt Lake Bees	Pacific Coast League
119	Lake Elsinore Diamond	7,866	Lake Elsinore	California	Lake Elsinore Storm	California League
120	ONEOK Field	7,833	Tulsa	Oklahoma	Tulsa Drillers	Texas League
121	FITTEAM Ballpark of the Palm Beaches	7,700	West Palm Beach	Florida	Houston Astros (Spring training); Washington Nationals (Spring training)	Grapefruit League; Grapefruit League
122	Whataburger Field	7,679	Corpus Christi	Texas	Corpus Christi Hooks	Texas League
123	7 17 Credit Union Park	7,630	Akron	Ohio	Akron RubberDucks	Eastern League
124	Charlotte Sports Park	7,670	Port Charlotte	Florida	Gulf Coast League Rays; Tampa Bay Rays (Spring training)	Gulf Coast League; Grapefruit League
125	Clipper Magazine Stadium	7,500	Lancaster	Pennsylvania	Lancaster Barnstormers	Atlantic League of Professional Baseball
126	Constellation Field	7,500	Sugar Land	Texas	Sugar Land Skeeters	Pacific Coast League
127	Hinchliffe Stadium	7,500	Paterson	New Jersey	New Jersey Jackals	Frontier League
128	Olympic Stadium	7,500	Hoquiam	Washington	Hoquiam Grizzlies	Evergreen League (WIAA)
129	Point Stadium	7,500	Johnstown	Pennsylvania	Johnstown Mill Rats	Prospect League
130	WellSpan Park	7,500	York	Pennsylvania	York Revolution	Atlantic League of Professional Baseball
131	World War Memorial Stadium	7,500	Greensboro	North Carolina	North Carolina A&T Aggies	Mid-Eastern Athletic Conference (NCAA)
132	Hadlock Field	7,368	Portland	Maine	Portland Sea Dogs	Eastern League
133	Wintrust Field	7,365	Schaumburg	Illinois	Schaumburg Boomers	Frontier League
134	Arvest Ballpark	7,305	Springdale	Arkansas	Northwest Arkansas Naturals	Texas League
135	CHS Field	7,210	St. Paul	Minnesota	St. Paul Saints	International League
136	Peoples Natural Gas Field	7,210	Altoona	Pennsylvania	Altoona Curve	Eastern League
137	Dickey–Stephens Park	7,200	North Little Rock	Arkansas	Arkansas Travelers	Texas League
138	SIUH Community Field	7,171	New York City	New York	Wagner Seahawks; Staten Island FerryHawks	Northeast Conference (NCAA); Atlantic League
139	Clover Park	7,160	Port St. Lucie	Florida	Gulf Coast League Mets; New York Mets (Spring training); St. Lucie Mets	Gulf Coast League; Grapefruit League; Florida State League
140	East Field Stadium	7,000	Glens Falls	New York	Glens Falls Dragons	Perfect Game Collegiate Baseball League
141	Maimonides Park	7,000	New York City	New York	Brooklyn Cyclones	South Atlantic League
142	Riverwalk Stadium	7,000	Montgomery	Alabama	Montgomery Biscuits	Southern League
143	Toyota Field	7,000	Madison	Alabama	Rocket City Trash Pandas	Southern League
144	Legends Field	6,994	Lexington	Kentucky	Lexington Legends	Atlantic League of Professional Baseball
145	Roger Dean Stadium	6,871	Jupiter	Florida	Jupiter Hammerheads; Palm Beach Cardinals; Gulf Coast League Marlins; Gulf Coast League Cardinals; Miami Marlins (Spring training); St. Louis Cardinals (Spring training)	Florida State League; Florida State League; Gulf Coast League; Gulf Coast League; Grapefruit League; Grapefruit League
146	Avista Stadium	6,803	Spokane Valley	Washington	Spokane Indians	Northwest League
147	Warner Park	6,750	Madison	Wisconsin	Madison Mallards	Northwoods League
148	Mike Martin Field at Dick Howser Stadium	6,700	Tallahassee	Florida	Florida State Seminoles	Atlantic Coast Conference (NCAA)
149	Lindquist Field	6,700	Ogden	Utah	Ogden Raptors	Pioneer League
150	Momentum Bank Ballpark	6,669	Midland	Texas	Midland RockHounds	Texas League
151	UFCU Disch-Falk Field	6,649	Austin	Texas	Texas Longhorns	Southeastern Conference (NCAA)
152	Hodgetown	6,631	Amarillo	Texas	Amarillo Sod Poodles	Texas League
153	TicketReturn.com Field	6,599	Myrtle Beach	South Carolina	Myrtle Beach Pelicans	Carolina League
154	LoanMart Field	6,588	Rancho Cucamonga	California	Rancho Cucamonga Quakes	California League
155	Clover Stadium	6,580	Pomona	New York	New York Boulders	Frontier League
156	Field of Legends	6,537	Kansas City	Kansas	Kansas City T-Bones/Monarchs	American Association of Professional Baseball
157	Cheney Stadium	6,500	Tacoma	Washington	Tacoma Rainiers	Pacific Coast League
158	Delta Dental Stadium	6,500	Manchester	New Hampshire	New Hampshire Fisher Cats	Eastern League
159	Five County Stadium	6,500	Zebulon	North Carolina	Zebulon Devil Dogz	Coastal Plain League
160	TicketSmarter Stadium	6,500	Windsor	Colorado	Northern Colorado Owlz	Pioneer League
161	Holman Stadium	6,478	Vero Beach	Florida	None	local and national tournaments
162	Smokies Stadium	6,412	Sevierville	Tennessee	none	none
163	Daniel S. Frawley Stadium	6,404	Wilmington	Delaware	Wilmington Blue Rocks	South Atlantic League
164	Covenant Health Park	6,355	Knoxville	Tennessee	Knoxville Smokies	Southern League
165	Arm & Hammer Park	6,341	Trenton	New Jersey	Trenton Thunder	MLB Draft League
166	Eastwood Field	6,300	Niles	Ohio	Mahoning Valley Scrappers; Youngstown State Penguins	MLB Draft League; Horizon League (NCAA)
167	Leidos Field at Ripken Stadium	6,300	Aberdeen	Maryland	Aberdeen IronBirds	South Atlantic League
168	Salem Memorial Ballpark	6,300	Salem	Virginia	Salem RidgeYaks	Carolina League
169	Doug Kingsmore Stadium	6,272	Clemson	South Carolina	Clemson Tigers	Atlantic Coast Conference (NCAA)
170	Dodd Stadium	6,270	Norwich	Connecticut	Norwich Sea Unicorns	Futures League
171	Yale Field	6,200	West Haven	Connecticut	Yale Bulldogs	Ivy League (NCAA)
172	Reckling Park	6,193	Houston	Texas	Rice Owls	Conference USA (NCAA)
173	FNB Field	6,187	Harrisburg	Pennsylvania	Harrisburg Senators	Eastern League
174	New Britain Stadium	6,146	New Britain	Connecticut	New Britain Bees	Futures Collegiate Baseball League
175	U.S. Steel Yard	6,139	Gary	Indiana	Gary SouthShore Railcats	American Association of Professional Baseball
176	Dunkin' Park	6,121	Hartford	Connecticut	Hartford Yard Goats	Eastern League
177	Olsen Field at Blue Bell Park	6,100	College Station	Texas	Texas A&M Aggies	Southeastern Conference (NCAA)
178	TD Bank Ballpark	6,100	Bridgewater	New Jersey	Somerset Patriots	Eastern League
179	UPMC Park	6,100	Erie	Pennsylvania	Erie SeaWolves	Eastern League
180	Shuckers Ballpark	6,067	Biloxi	Mississippi	Biloxi Shuckers	Southern League
181	Duly Health and Care Field	6,016	Joliet	Illinois	Joliet Slammers	Frontier League
182	ML "Tigue" Moore Field at Russo Park	6,015	Lafayette	Louisiana	Louisiana Ragin' Cajuns	Sun Belt Conference (NCAA)
183	Mirabito Stadium	6,012	Binghamton	New York	Binghamton Rumble Ponies	Eastern League
184	Fairfield Properties Ballpark	6,002	Central Islip	New York	Long Island Ducks	Atlantic League of Professional Baseball
185	The Ballpark at Jackson	6,000	Jackson	Tennessee	Jackson Rockabillies	Prospect League
186	Eldredge Park	6,000	Orleans	Massachusetts	Nauset Regional Warriors; Orleans Firebirds	Cape and Islands League (MIAA); Cape Cod Baseball League
187	Northwest Federal Field at Pfitzner Stadium	6,000	Woodbridge	Virginia	None	None
188	GCS Ballpark	6,000	Sauget	Illinois	Gateway Grizzlies	Frontier League
189	Hank Aaron Stadium	6,000	Mobile	Alabama	None	Local high-school tournaments
190	Joseph P. Riley Jr. Park	6,000	Charleston	South Carolina	Charleston River Dogs; The Citadel Bulldogs	Carolina League; Southern Conference (NCAA)
191	Municipal Stadium	6,000	Waterbury	Connecticut	Waterbury Silverbacks	Connecticut Collegiate Baseball League
192	Uni-Trade Stadium	6,000	Laredo	Texas	Tecolotes de los Dos Laredos	Mexican League
193	ONT Field	6,000	Ontario	California	Ontario Tower Buzzers	California League
194	Neuroscience Group Field at Fox Cities Stadium	5,900	Appleton	Wisconsin	Wisconsin Timber Rattlers	Midwest League
195	Pete Beiden Field at Bob Bennett Stadium	5,757	Fresno	California	Fresno State Bulldogs	Pac-12 Conference (NCAA)
196	Fluor Field	5,700	Greenville	South Carolina	Greenville Drive	South Atlantic League
197	Thurman Munson Memorial Stadium	5,700	Canton	Ohio	Canton McKinley Bulldogs	Federal League (OHSAA)
198	Davenport Field at Disharoon Park	5,500	Charlottesville	Virginia	Virginia Cavaliers	Atlantic Coast Conference (NCAA)
199	Dow Diamond	5,500	Midland	Michigan	Great Lakes Loons	Midwest League
200	Harry Grove Stadium	5,500	Frederick	Maryland	Frederick Keys	MLB Draft League
201	Red Wilson Field	5,500	Yarmouth	Massachusetts	Yarmouth-Dennis Red Sox	Cape Cod Baseball League
202	Springs Brooks Stadium	5,500	Conway	South Carolina	Coastal Carolina Chanticleers	Sun Belt Conference (NCAA)
203	Surf Stadium	5,500	Atlantic City	New Jersey	Atlantic Cape Community College Buccaneers	NJCAA
204	Truist Stadium	5,500	Winston-Salem	North Carolina	Winston-Salem Dash	South Atlantic League
205	Synovus Park	5,500	Columbus	Georgia	Columbus Clingstones	Southern League
206	Medlar Field	5,406	University Park	Pennsylvania	Penn State Nittany Lions; State College Spikes	Big Ten Conference (NCAA); MLB Draft League
207	Marion Stadium	5,400	Marion	Illinois	Heartland Hawks; Thrillville Thrillbillies	Mid-West Athletic Conference (NJCAA); Prospect League
208	First National Bank Field	5,300	Greensboro	North Carolina	Greensboro Grasshoppers	South Atlantic League
209	Veterans Memorial Stadium	5,300	Cedar Rapids	Iowa	Cedar Rapids Kernels	Midwest League
210	Arthur W. Perdue Stadium	5,200	Salisbury	Maryland	Delmarva Shorebirds; Maryland Eastern Shore Hawks	Carolina League; Mid-Eastern Athletic Conference (NCAA)
211	Banner Island Ballpark	5,200	Stockton	California	Stockton Ports	California League
212	Robin Roberts Stadium	5,200	Springfield	Illinois	Springfield Sliders	Prospect League
213	Palm Springs Stadium	5,185	Palm Springs	California	Palm Springs Power	Southern California Collegiate Baseball League; California Winter League
214	Bosse Field	5,181	Evansville	Indiana	Evansville Otters	Frontier League
215	CarShield Field	5,150	O'Fallon	Missouri	River City Rascals	Frontier League
216	AdventHealth Stadium	5,105	Rome	Georgia	Rome Braves	South Atlantic League
217	Latham Park	5,100	Elon	North Carolina	Elon Phoenix	Coastal Athletic Association (NCAA)
218	LP Frans Stadium	5,062	Hickory	North Carolina	Hickory Crawdads	South Atlantic League
219	Admiral Fetterman Field	5,038	Pensacola	Florida	Pensacola Blue Wahoos	Southern League
220	Edward A. LeLacheur Park	5,030	Lowell	Massachusetts	Lowell Spinners; UMass Lowell River Hawks	Futures League; America East Conference (NCAA)
221	Danville Stadium	5,028	Danville	Illinois	Danville Dans	Prospect League
222	Alex Rodriguez Park at Mark Light Field	5,000	Coral Gables	Florida	Miami Hurricanes	Atlantic Coast Conference (NCAA)
223	Baylor Ballpark	5,000	Waco	Texas	Baylor Bears	Big 12 Conference (NCAA)
224	Clark–LeClair Stadium	5,000	Greenville	North Carolina	East Carolina Pirates	American Conference (NCAA)
225	Coastal Florida Sports Park	5,000	Cocoa Beach	Florida	None	local and regional tournaments
226	Durham Athletic Park	5,000	Durham	North Carolina	North Carolina Central Eagles	Mid-Eastern Athletic Conference (NCAA)
227	Four Winds Field at Coveleski Stadium	5,000	South Bend	Indiana	South Bend Cubs	Midwest League
228	CaroMont Health Park	5,000	Gastonia	North Carolina	Gastonia Ghost Peppers	Atlantic League of Professional Baseball
229	Greer Field at Turchin Stadium	5,000	New Orleans	Louisiana	Tulane Green Wave	American Conference (NCAA)
230	Harris Field	5,000	Lewiston	Idaho	Lewis–Clark State College Warriors; NAIA World Series	Frontier League; NAIA
231	Kentucky Proud Park	5,000	Lexington	Kentucky	Kentucky Wildcats	Southeastern Conference (NCAA)
232	Little League Volunteer Stadium	5,000	South Williamsport	Pennsylvania	Little League World Series	Little League Baseball
233	Luis A. Canena Marquez Stadium	5,000	Aguadilla	Puerto Rico	Tiburones de Aguadilla	Liga de Béisbol Profesional Roberto Clemente
234	NelsonCorp Field	5,000	Clinton	Iowa	Clinton LumberKings	Prospect League
235	Mercy Health Stadium	5,000	Avon	Ohio	Lake Erie Crushers	Frontier League
236	UCCU Ballpark	5,000	Orem	Utah	Utah Valley Wolverines	Big West Conference (NCAA)
237	UTRGV Baseball Stadium	5,000	Edinburg	Texas	Texas–Rio Grande Valley Vaqueros	Western Athletic Conference (NCAA)
238	Virginia Credit Union Stadium	5,000	Fredericksburg	Virginia	Fredericksburg Nationals	Carolina League
239	Watertown Stadium	5,000	Watertown	South Dakota	Watertown Post 17	American Legion Baseball
240	Yogi Berra Stadium	5,000	Little Falls	New Jersey	NJIT Highlanders; Montclair State Redhawks	America East Conference(NCAA); New Jersey Athletic Conference (NCAA)
241	Jack Cook Field	5,000	Huntington	West Virginia	Marshall Thundering Herd; Tri-State Coal Cats	Sun Belt Conference(NCAA); Appalachian League
242	Atrium Health Ballpark	4,930	Kannapolis	North Carolina	Kannapolis Cannon Ballers	Carolina League
243	Muzzy Field	4,900	Bristol	Connecticut	Bristol Blues	New England Collegiate Baseball League
244	Segra Stadium	4,786	Fayetteville	North Carolina	Fayetteville Woodpeckers	Carolina League
245	SRP Park	4,782	North Augusta	South Carolina	Augusta Greenjackets	Carolina League
246	Campanelli Stadium	4,750	Brockton	Massachusetts	Brockton Rox; Brockton Boxers	Frontier League; Southeast Conference (MIAA)
247	Condron Ballpark	4,700	Gainesville	Florida	Florida Gators	Southeastern Conference (NCAA)
248	Turtle Creek Stadium	4,660	Traverse City	Michigan	Traverse City Pit Spitters	Northwoods League
249	McLane Baseball Stadium	4,600	East Lansing	Michigan	Michigan State Spartans	Big Ten Conference (NCAA)
250	Bowling Green Ballpark	4,559	Bowling Green	Kentucky	Bowling Green Hot Rods	South Atlantic League
251	Newman Outdoor Field	4,513	Fargo	North Dakota	Fargo-Moorhead RedHawks; North Dakota State Bison	American Association of Professional Baseball; Summit League (NCAA)
252	GoMart Ballpark	4,500	Charleston	West Virginia	Charleston Dirty Birds; Charleston Golden Eagles	Atlantic League of Professional Baseball; Mountain East Conference (NCAA)
253	C.O. Brown Stadium	4,500	Battle Creek	Michigan	Battle Creek Bombers; Kellogg Community College	Northwoods League; Michigan Community College Athletic Association (NJCAA)
254	Joseph L. Bruno Stadium	4,500	Troy	New York	Tri-City ValleyCats	Frontier League
255	Kokomo Municipal Stadium	4,500	Kokomo	Indiana	Indiana University Kokomo Cougars; Kokomo Jackrabbits	River States Conference (NAIA); Northwoods League
256	Lupton Stadium	4,500	Fort Worth	Texas	TCU Horned Frogs	Big 12 Conference (NCAA)
257	Hillsboro Ballpark	4,500	Hillsboro	Oregon	Hillsboro Hops	Northwest League
258	Thomas More Stadium	4,500	Florence	Kentucky	Florence Y'alls	Frontier League
259	Truist Point	4,500	High Point	North Carolina	High Point Rockers	Atlantic League of Professional Baseball
260	Wahconah Park	4,500	Pittsfield	Massachusetts	Pittsfield Suns	Futures Collegiate Baseball League
261	Heritage Financial Park	4,494	Fishkill	New York	Hudson Valley Renegades; Manhattan Jaspers	South Atlantic League; Metro Conference (NCAA)
262	Sioux Falls Stadium	4,462	Sioux Falls	South Dakota	Sioux Falls Canaries	American Association of Professional Baseball
263	Bill Davis Stadium	4,450	Columbus	Ohio	Ohio State Buckeyes	Big Ten Conference (NCAA)
264	Centennial Field	4,415	Burlington	Vermont	Vermont Lake Monsters	Futures Collegiate Baseball League
265	Mahaney Diamond	4,400	Orono	Maine	Maine Black Bears	America East Conference (NCAA)
266	Dan Law Field at Rip Griffin Park	4,368	Lubbock	Texas	Texas Tech Red Raiders	Big 12 Conference (NCAA)
267	Les Murakami Stadium	4,312	Honolulu	Hawaii	Hawaii Rainbow Warriors	Mountain West Conference (NCAA)
268	Pete Taylor Park	4,300	Hattiesburg	Mississippi	Southern Miss Golden Eagles	Conference USA (NCAA)
269	Bank of the James Stadium	4,281	Lynchburg	Virginia	Lynchburg Hillcats	Carolina League
270	Roto-Rooter Park	4,250	Keizer	Oregon	Salem-Keizer Volcanoes	Mavericks Independent Baseball League
271	Excite Ballpark	4,200	San Jose	California	San Jose Giants; San Jose State Spartans	California League; Mountain West Conference (NCAA)
272	Foster Field	4,200	San Angelo	Texas	Angelo State Rams	Lone Star Conference (NCAA)
273	Joe Becker Stadium	4,200	Joplin	Missouri	Joplin Outlaws	Mid America League
274	Radiology Associates Field at Jackie Robinson Ballpark	4,200	Daytona Beach	Florida	Bethune–Cookman Wildcats; Daytona Tortugas	Mid-Eastern Athletic Conference; Florida State League
275	Regency Furniture Stadium	4,200	Waldorf	Maryland	Southern Maryland Blue Crabs	Atlantic League of Professional Baseball
276	Skylands Stadium	4,200	Augusta	New Jersey	Sussex County Miners	Frontier League
277	Wade Stadium	4,200	Duluth	Minnesota	Duluth Huskies	Northwoods League
278	Jackie Robinson Memorial Field	4,200	Pasadena	California	Arroyo Seco Saints	California Collegiate League
279	Russ Chandler Stadium	4,157	Atlanta	Georgia	Georgia Tech Yellow Jackets	Atlantic Coast Conference (NCAA)
280	Alumni Field	4,100	Keene	New Hampshire	Keene Swamp Bats	New England Collegiate Baseball League
281	Boshamer Stadium	4,100	Chapel Hill	North Carolina	North Carolina Tar Heels	Atlantic Coast Conference (NCAA)
282	Mackenzie Stadium	4,100	Holyoke	Massachusetts	Valley Blue Sox	New England Collegiate Baseball League
283	Nettleton Stadium	4,100	Chico	California	Chico State Wildcats	California Collegiate Athletic Association (NCAA)
284	Robert and Mariam Hayes Stadium	4,100	Charlotte	North Carolina	Charlotte 49ers	Conference USA (NCAA)
285	Plainsman Park	4,096	Auburn	Alabama	Auburn Tigers	Southeastern Conference (NCAA)
286	Modern Woodmen Park	4,024	Davenport	Iowa	Quad Cities River Bandits	Midwest League
287	Dunn Field	4,020	Elmira	New York	Elmira Screaming Eagles; Elmira Pioneers	NAIA; Perfect Game Collegiate Baseball League
288	Bradner Stadium	4,000	Olean	New York	Olean Oilers	Perfect Game Collegiate Baseball League
289	Brazell Field at GCU Ballpark	4,000	Phoenix	Arizona	Grand Canyon Antelopes	West Coast Conference (NCAA)
290	Capital Credit Union Park	4,000	Ashwaubenon	Wisconsin	Green Bay Booyah	Northwoods League
291	Bryant Field	4,000	Marysville	California	Marysville Drakes	Pecos League
292	Crutcher Scott Field	4,000	Abilene	Texas	Abilene Christian Wildcats; Abilene Flying Bison	Southland Conference (NCAA); Mid-America League
293	Donovan Stadium	4,000	Utica	New York	Utica Blue Sox	Perfect Game Collegiate Baseball League
294	English Field	4,000	Blacksburg	Virginia	Virginia Tech Hokies	Atlantic Coast Conference (NCAA)
295	Franklin Field	4,000	Franklin	Wisconsin	Milwaukee Milkmen; Milwaukee Panthers	American Association of Professional Baseball; Horizon League (NCAA)
296	Grayson Stadium	4,000	Savannah	Georgia	Savannah Bananas	Banana Ball Championship League
297	Jim Patterson Stadium	4,000	Louisville	Kentucky	Louisville Cardinals	Atlantic Coast Conference (NCAA)
298	John Thurman Field	4,000	Modesto	California	Modesto Roadsters	Pioneer League
299	Klein Field at Sunken Diamond	4,000	Stanford	California	Stanford Cardinal	Atlantic Coast Conference (NCAA)
300	McCormick Field	4,000	Asheville	North Carolina	Asheville Tourists	South Atlantic League
301	Mike Carter Field	4,000	Tyler	Texas	Tyler Junior College Apache	NJCAA
302	PK Park	4,000	Eugene	Oregon	Eugene Emeralds; Oregon Ducks	Northwest League; Big Ten Conference (NCAA)
303	Ray Fisher Stadium	4,000	Ann Arbor	Michigan	Michigan Wolverines	Big Ten Conference (NCAA)
304	Rivets Stadium	4,000	Rockford	Illinois	Rockford Regents; Rockford Rivets	Northern Athletics Collegiate Conference (NCAA); Northwoods League
305	Sal Maglie Stadium	4,000	Niagara Falls	New York	Niagara Purple Eagles; Niagara Power	Metro Conference (NCAA); New York Collegiate Baseball League
306	Stoklosa Alumni Field	4,000	Lowell	Massachusetts	Lowell Red Raiders	Merrimack Valley Conference (MIAA)
307	Whitehouse Field	4,000	Harwich	Massachusetts	Harwich Mariners; Monomoy Sharks	Cape Cod Baseball League; Cape and Islands League (MIAA)
308	Raimondi Park	4,000	Oakland	California	Oakland Ballers	Pioneer League
309	ABC Supply Stadium	3,850	Beloit	Wisconsin	Beloit Snappers	Midwest League
310	John Euliano Park	3,841	Orlando	Florida	UCF Golden Knights	American Conference (NCAA)
311	David F. Couch Ballpark	3,823	Winston-Salem	North Carolina	Wake Forest Demon Deacons	Atlantic Coast Conference (NCAA)
312	Adelanto Stadium	3,808	Adelanto	California	None	None
313	Fraser Field	3,804	Lynn	Massachusetts	Fisher Falcons; North Shore Navigators	Independent (NAIA); Futures Collegiate Baseball League
314	Carson Park	3,800	Eau Claire	Wisconsin	Eau Claire Express	Northwoods League
315	TVA Credit Union Ballpark	3,800	Johnson City	Tennessee	Johnson City Doughboys	Appalachian League
316	Eddie Stanky Field	3,775	Mobile	Alabama	South Alabama Jaguars	Sun Belt Conference (NCAA)
317	War Memorial Stadium	3,750	Hampton	Virginia	Peninsula Pilots	Coastal Plain League
318	Goss Stadium at Coleman Field	3,737	Corvallis	Oregon	Oregon State Beavers	Pac-12 Conference (NCAA)
319	Damaschke Field	3,700	Oneonta	New York	Oneonta Outlaws	Perfect Game Collegiate Baseball League
320	Wilson Ballpark	3,700	Wilson	North Carolina	Wilson Warbirds	Carolina League
321	Everett Memorial Stadium	3,682	Everett	Washington	Everett AquaSox	Northwest League
322	Gesa Stadium	3,654	Pasco	Washington	Tri-City Dust Devils	Northwest League
323	Wisconsin Brewing Company Park	3,641	Oconomowoc	Wisconsin	Lake Country Dockhounds	American Association of Professional Baseball
324	Lewis and Clark Park	3,631	Sioux City	Iowa	Sioux City Explorers	American Association of Professional Baseball
325	Hawkins Field	3,626	Nashville	Tennessee	Vanderbilt Commodores	Southeastern Conference (NCAA)
326	Fiscalini Field	3,600	San Bernardino	California	Cal State San Bernardino Coyotes	California Collegiate Athletic Association (NCAA)
327	Phil Welch Stadium	3,600	St. Joseph	Missouri	St. Joseph Mustangs	M.I.N.K. League
328	Copeland Park	3,550	La Crosse	Wisconsin	La Crosse Loggers	Northwoods League
329	Bailey-Brayton Field	3,500	Pullman	Washington	Washington State Cougars	Pac-12 Conference (NCAA)
330	Brooks Stadium	3,500	Wilmington	North Carolina	UNC Wilmington Seahawks	Coastal Athletic Association (NCAA)
331	Burlington Athletic Stadium	3,500	Burlington	North Carolina	Burlington Sock Puppets	Appalachian League
332	Dobbins Stadium	3,500	Davis	California	UC Davis Aggies	Pac-12 Conference (NCAA)
333	Fifth Third Park	3,500	Spartanburg	South Carolina	Hub City Spartanburgers	South Atlantic League
334	Goodwin Field	3,500	Fullerton	California	Cal State Fullerton Titans	Big West Conference (NCAA)
335	Jack Kaiser Stadium	3,500	New York City	New York	St. John's Red Storm	Big East Conference (NCAA)
336	Luther Williams Field	3,500	Macon	Georgia	Macon Bacon	Coastal Plain League
337	Monongalia County Ballpark	3,500	Granville	West Virginia	West Virginia Mountaineers; West Virginia Black Bears	Southeastern Conference (NCAA); MLB Draft League
338	Mulcahy Stadium	3,500	Anchorage	Alaska	Anchorage Bucs; Anchorage Glacier Pilots	Alaska Baseball League
339	Ogren Park at Allegiance Field	3,500	Missoula	Montana	Missoula PaddleHeads	Pioneer League
340	Palmer Field	3,500	Middletown	Connecticut	Xavier Falcons; Middletown Post 75	Southern Connecticut Conference (CIAC); American Legion Baseball
341	Sam Lynn Ballpark	3,500	Bakersfield	California	Bakersfield Train Robbers	Pecos League
342	Schroeder Park	3,500	Houston	Texas	Houston Cougars	Big 12 Conference (NCAA)
343	UNCG Baseball Stadium	3,500	Greensboro	North Carolina	UNC Greensboro Spartans	Southern Conference (NCAA)
344	Veterans Memorial Park	3,500	Little Falls	New York	Mohawk Valley DiamondDawgs	Perfect Game Collegiate Baseball League
345	Vince Genna Stadium	3,500	Bend	Oregon	Bend Elks	West Coast League
346	Vincent-Beck Stadium	3,500	Beaumont	Texas	Lamar Cardinals	Southland Conference (NCAA)
347	Wong Stadium	3,500	Hilo	Hawaii	Hawaii–Hilo Vulcans	Pacific West Conference (NCAA)
348	Meritus Park	3,500	Hagerstown	Maryland	Hagerstown Flying Boxcars	Atlantic League
349	Dave Regan Stadium	3,500	Fort Scott	Kansas	Fort Scott Dragoons	Mid-America League
350	Memorial Stadium	3,452	Boise	Idaho	Boise Hawks	Pioneer League
351	Anteater Ballpark	3,408	Irvine	California	UC Irvine Anteaters	Big West Conference (NCAA)
352	Grainger Stadium	3,400	Kinston	North Carolina	Down East Bird Dawgs	Frontier League
353	Blair Field	3,238	Long Beach	California	Long Beach State Dirtbags	Big West Conference (NCAA)
354	USF Baseball Stadium	3,211	Tampa	Florida	South Florida Bulls	American Conference (NCAA)
355	Calfee Park	3,200	Pulaski	Virginia	Pulaski River Turtles	Appalachian League
356	Community Field	3,200	Burlington	Iowa	Burlington Bees	Prospect League
357	Melaleuca Field	3,200	Idaho Falls	Idaho	Idaho Falls Chukars	Pioneer League
358	Ozinga Field	3,200	Crestwood	Illinois	Windy City Thunderbolts	Frontier League
359	Ray E. Didier Field	3,200	Thibodaux	Louisiana	Nicholls Colonels	Southland Conference (NCAA)
360	Wild Things Park	3,200	Washington	Pennsylvania	Washington Wild Things	Frontier League
361	Kimrey Family Stadium	3,180	Norman	Oklahoma	Oklahoma Sooners	Southeastern Conference (NCAA)
362	Homer Stryker Field	3,171	Kalamazoo	Michigan	Kalamazoo Growlers	Northwoods League
363	Robin Baggett Stadium	3,138	San Luis Obispo	California	Cal Poly Mustangs	Big West Conference (NCAA)
364	UC Baseball Stadium	3,085	Cincinnati	Ohio	Cincinnati Bearcats	Big 12 Conference (NCAA)
365	Dehler Park	3,071	Billings	Montana	Billings Mustangs	Pioneer League
366	Taylor Stadium	3,031	Columbia	Missouri	Missouri Tigers	Southeastern Conference (NCAA)
367	Centene Stadium	3,001	Great Falls	Montana	Great Falls Voyagers	Pioneer League
368	Bowen Field	3,000	Bluefield	West Virginia	Bluefield Blue Jays	Appalachian League
369	Cardines Field	3,000	Newport	Rhode Island	Newport Gulls	New England Collegiate Baseball League
370	Doak Field	3,000	Raleigh	North Carolina	NC State Wolfpack	Atlantic Coast Conference (NCAA)
371	Doran Park	3,000	Bourne	Massachusetts	Bourne Braves	Cape Cod Baseball League
372	Duane Banks Field	3,000	Iowa City	Iowa	Iowa Hawkeyes	Big Ten Conference (NCAA)
373	Duncan Park	3,000	Spartanburg	South Carolina	Spartanburg Vikings; Spartanburg Post 7 baseball	Class AAAAA Region 2 (SCHSL); American Legion Baseball
374	Duffy Fairgrounds	3,000	Watertown	New York	Watertown Rapids	Perfect Game Collegiate Baseball League
375	Earl Wilson Stadium	3,000	Las Vegas	Nevada	UNLV Rebels	Mountain West Conference (NCAA)
376	Fleming Stadium	3,000	Wilson	North Carolina	Wilson Tobs	Coastal Plain League
377	Fowler Park	3,000	San Diego	California	San Diego Toreros	West Coast Conference (NCAA)
378	Hanover Insurance Park at Fitton Field	3,000	Worcester	Massachusetts	Holy Cross Crusaders; Worcester Bravehearts	Patriot League (NCAA); Futures Collegiate Baseball League
379	Illinois Field	3,000	Champaign	Illinois	Illinois Fighting Illini	Big Ten Conference (NCAA)
380	J.I. Clements Stadium	3,000	Statesboro	Georgia	Georgia Southern Eagles	Sun Belt Conference (NCAA)
381	Kapco Park	3,000	Mequon	Wisconsin	Lakeshore Chinooks	Northwoods League
382	Lexington County Baseball Stadium	3,000	Lexington	South Carolina	Lexington County Blowfish	Coastal Plain League
383	McDonough Park	3,000	Geneva	New York	Geneva Red Wings	Perfect Game Collegiate Baseball League
384	McKeon Park	3,000	Hyannis	Massachusetts	Hyannis Harbor Hawks	Cape Cod Baseball League
385	Melching Field at Conrad Park	3,000	DeLand	Florida	Stetson Hatters; DeLand Suns	Atlantic Sun Athletic Conference; Florida Collegiate Summer League
386	Russell Diethrick Park	3,000	Jamestown	New York	Jamestown Tarp Skunks	Perfect Game Collegiate Baseball League
387	Shuttleworth Park	3,000	Amsterdam	New York	Union Dutchmen; Amsterdam Mohawks	Liberty League (NCAA); Perfect Game Collegiate Baseball League
388	Spillane Field	3,000	Wareham	Massachusetts	Wareham Gatemen	Cape Cod Baseball League
389	Stony Brook Field	3,000	Brewster	Massachusetts	Brewster Whitecaps	Cape Cod Baseball League
390	Tony Gwynn Stadium	3,000	San Diego	California	San Diego State Aztecs	Pac-12 Conference (NCAA)
391	VA Memorial Stadium	3,000	Chillicothe	Ohio	Chillicothe Paints	Prospect League
392	William Peccole Park	3,000	Reno	Nevada	Nevada Wolf Pack	Mountain West Conference (NCAA)
393	America First Field	3,000	Salt Lake City	Utah	Utah Utes	Big 12 Conference (NCAA)
394	Kiger Stadium	2,878	Altamont	Oregon	Klamath Falls Gems	None
395	Holman Stadium	2,825	Nashua	New Hampshire	Nashua Silver Knights	Futures Collegiate Baseball League
396	Falcon Park	2,800	Auburn	New York	Auburn Doubledays	Perfect Game Collegiate Baseball League
397	League Stadium	2,783	Huntingburg	Indiana	Dubois County Bombers	Prospect League
398	Foley Field	2,760	Athens	Georgia	Georgia Bulldogs	Southeastern Conference (NCAA)
399	Maestri Field at Privateer Park	2,705	New Orleans	Louisiana	New Orleans Privateers	Southland Conference (NCAA)
400	Yakima County Stadium	2,654	Yakima	Washington	Yakima Valley Pippins	West Coast League
401	Dwyer Stadium	2,600	Batavia	New York	Batavia Muckdogs	Perfect Game Collegiate Baseball League
402	Loeb Stadium	2,600	Lafayette	Indiana	Lafayette Aviators	Prospect League
403	Reese Smith Jr. Field	2,600	Murfreesboro	Tennessee	Middle Tennessee Blue Raiders	Conference USA (NCAA)
404	American Legion Field	2,588	Danville	Virginia	Danville Braves	Appalachian League
405	Mayo Field	2,570	Rochester	Minnesota	Rochester Honkers	Northwoods League
406	Borleske Stadium	2,521	Walla Walla	Washington	Walla Walla Sweets	West Coast League
407	Riverfront Stadium	2,512	Waterloo	Iowa	Waterloo Bucks	Northwoods League
408	Bart Kaufman Field	2,500	Bloomington	Indiana	Indiana Hoosiers	Big Ten Conference (NCAA)
409	BB&T Ballpark at Historic Bowman Field	2,500	Williamsport	Pennsylvania	Williamsport Crosscutters	MLB Draft League
410	Bob "Turtle" Smith Stadium	2,500	College Park	Maryland	Maryland Terrapins	Big Ten Conference (NCAA)
411	Bob Warn Field at Sycamore Stadium	2,500	Terre Haute	Indiana	Terre Haute Rex; Indiana State Sycamores	Prospect League; Missouri Valley Conference (NCAA)
412	Bobcat Ballpark	2,500	San Marcos	Texas	Texas State Bobcats	Pac-12 Conference (NCAA)
413	Bruce Hurst Field	2,500	St. George	Utah	Utah Tech Trailblazers^{(formerly Dixie State)}	Mountain West Conference (NCAA)
414	Bud Metheny Ballpark	2,500	Norfolk	Virginia	Old Dominion Monarchs	Sun Belt Conference (NCAA)
415	Clemens Field	2,500	Hannibal	Missouri	Hannibal Pirates	North Central Missouri Conference (MSHSAA)
416	Dedeaux Field	2,500	Los Angeles	California	USC Trojans	Big Ten Conference (NCAA)
417	Don Edwards Park	2,500	Newark	Ohio	Ohio Bison	Great Lakes Summer Collegiate League
418	Eddie Pellagrini Diamond	2,500	Boston	Massachusetts	Boston College Eagles	Atlantic Coast Conference (NCAA)
419	Evans Diamond	2,500	Berkeley	California	California Golden Bears	Atlantic Coast Conference (NCAA)
420	Fossum Field	2,500	Aberdeen	South Dakota	Aberdeen Smittys	American Legion Baseball
421	Frank Eck Stadium	2,500	South Bend	Indiana	Notre Dame Fighting Irish	Atlantic Coast Conference (NCAA)
422	Hoglund Ballpark	2,500	Lawrence	Kansas	Kansas Jayhawks	Big 12 Conference (NCAA)
423	Hooker Field	2,500	Martinsville	Virginia	Martinsville Mustangs	Coastal Plain League
424	Hunter Wright Stadium	2,500	Kingsport	Tennessee	Kingsport Axmen	Appalachian League
425	Klein Family Field	2,500	Stockton	California	Pacific Tigers	West Coast Conference (NCAA)
426	Liberty Baseball Stadium	2,500	Lynchburg	Virginia	Liberty Flames	ASUN Conference (NCAA)
427	Linda K. Epling Stadium	2,500	Beckley	West Virginia	WVU Tech Golden Bears	River States Conference (NAIA)
428	Lloyd Hopkins Field	2,500	Alton	Illinois	Alton River Dragons	Prospect League
429	Mills Field	2,500	Brainerd	Minnesota	None	local tournaments
430	Newman Field	2,500	Salisbury	North Carolina	Catawba Indians	South Atlantic Conference (NCAA)
431	Oestrike Stadium	2,500	Ypsilanti	Michigan	Eastern Michigan Eagles	Mid-American Conference (NCAA)
432	Pioneer Park	2,500	Greeneville	Tennessee	Tusculum Pioneers; Greeneville Flyboys	South Atlantic Conference (NCAA); Appalachian League
433	QU Stadium	2,500	Quincy	Illinois	Quincy Hawks; Quincy Doggy Paddlers	Great Lakes Valley Conference (NCAA); Prospect League
434	Riverside Sports Complex	2,500	Riverside	California	UC Riverside Highlanders	Big West Conference (NCAA)
435	Rogers Park	2,500	Danbury	Connecticut	Danbury Westerners	New England Collegiate Baseball League
436	Russell C. King Field	2,500	Spartanburg	South Carolina	Wofford Terriers baseball	Southern Conference (NCAA)
437	Bob Wren Stadium	2,500	Athens	Ohio	Ohio Bobcats; Southern Ohio Copperheads	Mid-American Conference (NCAA); Great Lakes Summer Collegiate League
438	Floyd Fitzgerald Stadium	2,500	Rapid City	South Dakota	Post 22 Hardhats	American Legion Baseball
439	J. L. Johnson Stadium	2,418	Tulsa	Oklahoma	Oral Roberts Golden Eagles	Summit League (NCAA)
440	Parsons Field	2,400	Boston	Massachusetts	Northeastern Huskies	Coastal Athletic Association (NCAA)
441	Taylor Field	2,400	Pine Bluff	Arkansas	Pine Bluff Zebras	Class 5A South (AAA)
442	Tointon Family Stadium	2,331	Manhattan	Kansas	Kansas State Wildcats	Big 12 Conference (NCAA)
443	O'Neal Field at Big Rock Stadium	2,300	Morehead City	North Carolina	Morehead City Marlins	Coastal Plain League
444	Dickson Stadium	2,260	San Antonio	Texas	St. Mary's Rattlers	Lone Star Conference (NCAA)
445	Larry H. Miller Field	2,204	Provo	Utah	BYU Cougars	Big 12 Conference (NCAA)
446	Husky Ballpark	2,200	Seattle	Washington	Washington Huskies	Big Ten Conference (NCAA)
447	Kearney Memorial Field	2,200	Kearney	Nebraska	Kearney Bearcats	Heartland Athletic Conference (NSAA)
448	Mike Lansing Field	2,200	Casper	Wyoming	Casper Spuds	Independence League Baseball
449	Harry & David Field	2,178	Medford	Oregon	Medford Rogues	None
450	Kindrick Field	2,100	Helena	Montana	Helena Senators	American Legion Baseball
451	Simmons Field	2,100	Kenosha	Wisconsin	Kenosha Kingfish	Northwoods League
452	Theunissen Stadium	2,046	Mt. Pleasant	Michigan	Central Michigan Chippewas	Mid-American Conference (NCAA)
453	Rudy Abbott Field	2,020	Jacksonville	Alabama	Jacksonville State Gamecocks	Ohio Valley Conference (NCAA)
454	Coleman Field	2,004	Cary	North Carolina	USA Baseball	None
455	Acadian Park	2,000	New Iberia	Louisiana	None	None
456	Alexander Field	2,000	West Lafayette	Indiana	Purdue Boilermakers	Big Ten Conference (NCAA)
457	Capaha Field	2,000	Cape Girardeau	Missouri	Southeast Missouri State Redhawks; Cape Catfish	Ohio Valley Conference (NCAA); Prospect League
458	Casey Field	2,000	Covington	Virginia	Covington Lumberjacks	Valley Baseball League
459	Colburn Park	2,000	Newark	New York	Newark Pilots	Perfect Game Collegiate Baseball League
460	CofC Baseball Stadium at Patriots Point	2,000	Mount Pleasant	South Carolina	College of Charleston Cougars	Coastal Athletic Association (NCAA)
461	DeVault Memorial Stadium	2,000	Bristol	Virginia	Bristol State Liners	Appalachian League
462	FedExPark	2,000	Memphis	Tennessee	Memphis Tigers	American Conference (NCAA)
463	Halliwell Park	2,000	Pocatello	Idaho	Idaho State Bengals; Gate City Grays	National Club Baseball Association; Northern Utah League
464	Harold Kraft Memorial Field	2,000	Grand Forks	North Dakota	North Dakota Fighting Hawks	Western Athletic Conference (NCAA)
465	Historic Sanford Memorial Stadium	2,000	Sanford	Florida	Sanford River Rats	Florida Collegiate Summer League
466	Horner Ballpark	2,000	Dallas	Texas	Dallas Baptist Patriots	Pac-12 Conference (NCAA)
467	Infinity Insurance Park	2,000	University Park	Florida	FIU Panthers	Conference USA (NCAA)
468	ISG Field	2,000	Mankato	Minnesota	Mankato Moondogs	Northwoods League
469	Itchy Jones Stadium	2,000	Carbondale	Illinois	Southern Illinois Salukis	Missouri Valley Conference (NCAA)
470	J.C. Love Field	2,000	Ruston	Louisiana	Louisiana Tech Bulldogs	Conference USA (NCAA)
471	Jack Coombs Field	2,000	Durham	North Carolina	Duke Blue Devils	Atlantic Coast Conference (NCAA)
472	UWM Field	2,000	Utica	Michigan		United Shore Professional Baseball League
473	Joe Faber Field	2,000	St. Cloud	Minnesota	St. Cloud State Huskies; St. Cloud Rox	Northern Sun Intercollegiate Conference (NCAA); Northwoods League
474	McNair Field	2,000	Forest City	North Carolina	Forest City Owls	Coastal Plain League
475	Pat Kenelly Diamond at Alumni Field	2,000	Hammond	Louisiana	Southeastern Louisiana Lions	Southland Conference (NCAA)
476	Pat Thomas Stadium	2,000	Leesburg	Florida	Leesburg Lightning	Florida Collegiate Summer League
477	Paul Walsh Field	2,000	New Bedford	Massachusetts	None	None
478	Patterson Baseball Complex	2,000	Spokane	Washington	Gonzaga Bulldogs	Pac-12 Conference (NCAA)
479	Riley Park	2,000	Sumter	South Carolina	USC Sumter Fire Ants	Carolinas Junior College Conference (NJCAA)
480	Riddle–Pace Field	2,000	Troy	Alabama	Troy Trojans	Sun Belt Conference (NCAA)
481	Shepherd Stadium	2,000	Colonial Heights	Virginia	Tri-City Chili Peppers	Coastal Plain League
482	Sonny Pittaro Field	2,000	Lawrenceville	New Jersey	Rider Broncs	Metro Conference (NCAA)
483	Vineyard Baseball Park	2,000	Oak Bluffs	Massachusetts	Martha's Vineyard Sharks; Martha's Vineyard Vineyarders	New England Collegiate Baseball League; Cape and Islands League (MIAA)
484	Fireman's Field	2,000	Purcellville	Virginia	Purcellville Cannons	Valley Baseball League
485	Bismarck Municipal Ballpark	1,900	Bismarck	North Dakota	Mary Marauders; Bismarck Larks	Northern Sun Intercollegiate Conference (NCAA); Northwoods League
486	Growden Memorial Park	1,900	Fairbanks	Alaska	Alaska Goldpanners	Alaska Baseball League
487	Valley Strong Ballpark	1,888	Visalia	California	Visalia Rawhide	California League
488	Jackie Robinson Stadium	1,879	Los Angeles	California	UCLA Bruins	Big Ten Conference (NCAA)
489	Athletic Park	1,870	Wausau	Wisconsin	Wisconsin Woodchucks	Northwoods League
490	Eddy D. Field Stadium	1,800	Malibu	California	Pepperdine Waves	West Coast Conference (NCAA)
491	J. Polk Brooks Stadium	1,800	Paducah	Kentucky	Paducah Chiefs	Ohio Valley League
492	Joe Wolfe Field	1,800	North Adams	Massachusetts	North Adams Steeplecats	New England Collegiate Baseball League
493	McBride Stadium	1,800	Richmond	Indiana	Richmond Jazz	Great Lakes Summer Collegiate League
494	Ting Stadium	1,800	Holly Springs	North Carolina	Holly Springs Salamanders	Coastal Plain League
495	Warhawk Field	1,800	Monroe	Louisiana	ULM Warhawks	Sun Belt Conference (NCAA)
496	Winthrop Ballpark	1,800	Rock Hill	South Carolina	Winthrop Eagles	Southern Conference (NCAA)
497	The Depot at Cleburne Station	1,790	Cleburne	Texas	Cleburne Railroaders	American Association of Professional Baseball
498	Sparrow Stadium	1,755	Florence	South Carolina	Francis Marion Patriots	Peach Belt Conference (NCAA)
499	John Sessions Stadium	1,750	Jacksonville	Florida	Jacksonville Dolphins	ASUN Conference (NCAA)
500	FAU Baseball Stadium	1,718	Boca Raton	Florida	Florida Atlantic Owls	Conference USA (NCAA)
501	Finch Field	1,700	Thomasville	North Carolina	High Point-Thomasville HiToms	Coastal Plain League
502	H.P. Hunnicutt Field	1,700	Princeton	West Virginia	Princeton Rays	Appalachian League
503	Joe O'Brien Field	1,650	Elizabethton	Tennessee	Elizabethton River Riders	Appalachian League
504	Red Rolfe Field at Biondi Park	1,650	Hanover	New Hampshire	Dartmouth Big Green	Ivy League (NCAA)
505	Witter Field	1,611	Wisconsin Rapids	Wisconsin	Wisconsin Rapids Rafters	Northwoods League
506	Clay Gould Ballpark	1,600	Arlington	Texas	UT Arlington Mavericks	Sun Belt Conference (NCAA)
507	Joe Martin Field	1,600	Bellingham	Washington	Bellingham Bells	West Coast League
508	Joseph J. O'Donnell Field	1,600	Boston	Massachusetts	Harvard Crimson	Ivy League (NCAA)
509	Walker Stadium	1,566	Portland	Oregon	Portland Pickles	West Coast League
510	Rosemont Field	1,545	Rosemont	Illinois	None	None
511	Bainton Field	1,500	Piscataway	New Jersey	Rutgers Scarlet Knights	Big Ten Conference (NCAA)
512	Ball Diamond	1,500	Muncie	Indiana	Ball State Cardinals	Mid-American Conference (NCAA)
513	Dugan Field	1,500	Nashville	Tennessee	Lipscomb Bisons	ASUN Conference (NCAA)
514	Eastern Baseball Stadium	1,500	Willimantic	Connecticut	Eastern Connecticut State Warriors	Little East Conference (NCAA)
515	Hennon Stadium	1,500	Cullowhee	North Carolina	Western Carolina Catamounts	Southern Conference (NCAA)
516	Hyames Field	1,500	Kalamazoo	Michigan	Western Michigan Broncos	Mid-American Conference (NCAA)
517	Jack Critchfield Park	1,500	Slippery Rock	Pennsylvania	Slippery Rock University	Pennsylvania State Athletic Conference (NCAA)
518	Jackson Field	1,500	Greeley	Colorado	Northern Colorado Bears	Western Athletic Conference (NCAA)
519	Jim Perry Stadium	1,500	Buies Creek	North Carolina	Campbell Camels	Big South Conference (NCAA)
520	Joe Cannon Stadium	1,500	Hanover	Maryland	Coppin State Eagles	Mid-Eastern Athletic Conference (NCAA)
521	Joe Miller Ballpark	1,500	Lake Charles	Louisiana	McNeese State Cowboys	Southland Conference (NCAA)
522	Knute Nelson Memorial Park	1,500	Alexandria	Minnesota	None	None
523	Lee–Hines Field	1,500	Baton Rouge	Louisiana	Southern Jaguars	Southwestern Athletic Conference (NCAA)
524	Louis Guisto Field	1,500	Moraga	California	St. Mary's Gaels; Walnut Creek Crawdads	West Coast Conference (NCAA); California Collegiate League
525	Maehara Stadium	1,500	Kahului	Hawaii	Baldwin Bears	Maui Interscholastic League (HHSAA)
526	Marty L. Miller Field	1,500	Norfolk	Virginia	Norfolk State Spartans	Mid-Eastern Athletic Conference (NCAA)
527	Mel Olson Stadium	1,500	Burien	Washington	DubSea Fish Sticks	Pacific International League
528	Mike D. Lane Field	1,500	Florence	Alabama	North Alabama Lions	United Athletic Conference (NCAA)
529	Nick Denes Field	1,500	Bowling Green	Kentucky	Western Kentucky Hilltoppers	Conference USA (NCAA)
530	OrthoGeorgia Park	1,500	Macon	Georgia	Mercer Bears	Southern Conference (NCAA)
531	Ralph McKinzie Field	1,500	DeKalb	Illinois	Northern Illinois Huskies	Horizon League (NCAA)
532	Riverside Stadium	1,500	Victoria	Texas	Texas A&M–Victoria Jaguars; Victoria Generals	Red River Athletic Conference (NAIA); Texas Collegiate League
533	Robertson Field at Satow Stadium	1,500	New York City	New York	Columbia Lions	Ivy League (NCAA)
534	Roy E. Lee Field at Simmons Baseball Complex	1,500	Edwardsville	Illinois	SIU Edwardsville Cougars	Ohio Valley Conference (NCAA)
535	Shirley Povich Field	1,500	Bethesda	Maryland	Georgetown Hoyas; Bethesda Big Train	Big East Conference (NCAA); Cal Ripken Collegiate Baseball League
536	Skeeles Field	1,500	Akron	Ohio	Akron Zips	Mid-American Conference (NCAA)
537	Stephen Schott Stadium	1,500	Santa Clara	California	Santa Clara Broncos	West Coast Conference (NCAA)
538	Swanson Stadium	1,500	Fort Myers	Florida	Florida Gulf Coast Eagles	ASUN Conference (NCAA)
539	Tal Anderson Field	1,500	Omaha	Nebraska	Omaha Mavericks	Summit League (NCAA)
540	Terwilliger Brothers Field at Max Bishop Stadium	1,500	Annapolis	Maryland	Navy Midshipmen	Patriot League (NCAA)
541	Majestic Park	1,500	Hot Springs	Arkansas		Natural State Collegiate League
542	War Memorial Field	1,500	Sandpoint	Idaho	Sandpoint Bulldogs	Inland Empire League (IHSAA)
543	Siebert Field	1,420	Minneapolis	Minnesota	Minnesota Golden Gophers	Big Ten Conference (NCAA)
544	Carolina Bank Field	1,408	Florence	South Carolina	Florence Flamingos	Coastal Plain League
545	Eagle Stadium	1,400	Ozark	Alabama	Carroll Eagles	Class 6A Region 2 (AHSAA)
546	Gray–Minor Stadium	1,400	Lexington	Virginia	VMI Keydets	Southern Conference (NCAA)
547	McCrary Park	1,400	Asheboro	North Carolina	Asheboro ZooKeepers	Coastal Plain League
548	Warren Ballpark	1,400	Bisbee	Arizona	Bisbee Pumas	Class 2A South (AIA)
549	Kokernot Field	1,400	Alpine	Texas	Alpine Cowboys	Pecos League
550	Elliot Ballpark	1,351	Storrs	Connecticut	UConn Huskies	Big East Conference (NCAA)
551	Bob Hannah Stadium	1,300	Newark	Delaware	Delaware Fightin' Blue Hens	Coastal Athletic Association (NCAA)
552	Coral Seymour Memorial Ballpark	1,300	Kenai	Alaska	Peninsula Oilers	Alaska Baseball League
553	Duncan Field	1,300	Hastings	Nebraska	Hastings Sodbusters	Diamond Baseball League
554	Hermon Brothers Field	1,300	Palmer	Alaska	Mat-Su Miners	Alaska Baseball League
555	Joe Etzel Field	1,300	Portland	Oregon	Portland Pilots	West Coast Conference (NCAA)
556	Corbett Field	1,276	Minot	North Dakota	Minot Hot Tots	Northwoods League
557	Prasco Park	1,250	Mason	Ohio	Big East Conference baseball tournament	NCAA
558	David Story Field	1,230	Longview	Washington	Cowlitz Black Bears	West Coast League
559	Charles H. Braun Stadium	1,200	Evansville	Indiana	Evansville Purple Aces	Missouri Valley Conference (NCAA)
560	Choccolocco Park	1,200	Oxford	Alabama	Oxford Yellow Jackets	Class 6A Area 13 (AHSAA)
561	Demske Sports Complex	1,200	Buffalo	New York	Canisius Golden Griffins	Metro Conference (NCAA)
562	Eagle Field at Veterans Memorial Park	1,200	Harrisonburg	Virginia	James Madison Dukes; Harrisonburg Turks	Coastal Athletic Association (NCAA); Valley Baseball League
563	Fred Stillwell Stadium	1,200	Kennesaw	Georgia	Kennesaw State Owls	ASUN Conference (NCAA)
564	Gene Lobe Field	1,200	Bremerton	Washington	Olympic Trojans	Olympic League (WIAA)
565	H. Alvin Brown–C. C. Stroud Field	1,200	Natchitoches	Louisiana	Northwestern State Demons	Southland Conference (NCAA)
566	Hicks Field	1,200	Edenton	North Carolina	Edenton Steamers	Tidewater Summer League
567	John Smith Field	1,200	Sacramento	California	Sacramento State Hornets	Big West Conference (NCAA)
568	Montpelier Recreation Field	1,200	Montpelier	Vermont	Vermont Mountaineers	New England Collegiate Baseball League
569	Paul Thomas Sr. Field	1,200	Wenatchee	Washington	Wenatchee AppleSox	West Coast League
570	Robbie Mills Field	1,200	Laconia	New Hampshire	Plymouth State Panthers	Little East Conference(NCAA)
571	Tomlinson Stadium–Kell Field	1,200	Jonesboro	Arkansas	Arkansas State Red Wolves	Sun Belt Conference (NCAA)
572	Tiger Field	1,200	Redding	California	Redding Colt 45s	California Collegiate League
573	Merchants Park	1,200	Carroll	Iowa	Carroll Merchants	M.I.N.K. Collegiate Baseball League
574	Grider Stadium	1,200	Tullahoma	Tennessee	Tullahoma Test Pilots	Volunteer State League
575	George Dobson Field	1,200	Texarkana	Texas	Texas A&M-Texarkana Eagles; Texarkana Rhinos	Red River Athletic Conference (NAIA); Mid-America League
576	Don Sanders Stadium	1,164	Huntsville	Texas	Sam Houston State Bearkats	Southland Conference (NCAA)
577	Benedictine University Ballpark	1,100	Lisle	Illinois	Benedictine Eagles	Northern Athletics Collegiate Conference (NCAA)
578	Bill Taunton Stadium	1,100	Willmar	Minnesota	Willmar Stingers	Northwoods League
579	Bush Stadium at Averitt Express Baseball Complex	1,100	Cookeville	Tennessee	Tennessee Tech Golden Eagles	Southern Conference (NCAA)
580	Ralph Waldo Emerson Jones Park and Wilbert Ellis Field	1,100	Grambling	Louisiana	Grambling State Tigers	Southwestern Athletic Conference (NCAA)
581	Steller Field	1,100	Bowling Green	Ohio	Bowling Green Falcons baseball	Mid-American Conference (NCAA)
582	Georgia State Baseball Complex	1,092	Decatur	Georgia	Georgia State Panthers; Atlanta Blues	Sun Belt Conference (NCAA); Sun Belt League
583	Carleton Davidson Stadium	1,077	Springfield	Ohio	Wittenberg Tigers; Champion City Kings	North Coast Athletic Conference (NCAA); Prospect League
584	Allen Field	1,000	Morehead	Kentucky	Morehead State Eagles	Ohio Valley Conference (NCAA)
585	The Baseball Factory Field at UMBC	1,000	Catonsville	Maryland	UMBC Retrievers	America East Conference (NCAA)
586	Bear Stadium	1,000	Conway	Arkansas	Central Arkansas Bears	United Athletic Conference (NCAA)
587	Bill Beck Field	1,000	Kingston	Rhode Island	Rhode Island Rams	Atlantic 10 Conference (NCAA)
588	Binghamton Baseball Complex	1,000	Binghamton	New York	Binghamton Bearcats	America East Conference (NCAA)
589	Caesar Uyesaka Stadium	1,000	Santa Barbara	California	UC Santa Barbara Gauchos	Big West Conference (NCAA)
590	CCSU Baseball Field	1,000	New Britain	Connecticut	Central Connecticut Blue Devils	Northeast Conference (NCAA)
591	CSU Ballpark	1,000	North Charleston	South Carolina	Charleston Southern Buccaneers	Big South Conference (NCAA)
592	Dante Benedetti Diamond at Max Ulrich Field	1,000	San Francisco	California	San Francisco Dons	West Coast Conference (NCAA)
593	Duffy Bass Field	1,000	Normal	Illinois	Illinois State Redbirds	Missouri Valley Conference (NCAA)
594	Curtus Granderson Stadium	1,000	Chicago	Illinois	UIC Flames	Horizon League (NCAA)
595	Earl Lorden Field	1,000	Amherst	Massachusetts	Massachusetts Minutemen	Atlantic 10 Conference (NCAA)
596	Eugene B. Depew Field	1,000	Lewisburg	Pennsylvania	Bucknell Bison	Patriot League (NCAA)
597	Falcon Baseball Field	1,000	Colorado Springs	Colorado	Air Force Falcons	Mountain West Conference (NCAA)
598	Fiondella Field	1,000	Hartford	Connecticut	Hartford Hawks	Conference of New England (NCAA)
599	George C. Page Stadium	1,000	Los Angeles	California	Loyola Marymount Lions	West Coast Conference (NCAA)
600	Greenwood Baseball Field	1,000	Asheville	North Carolina	UNC Asheville Bulldogs	Big South Conference (NCAA)
601	Hank DeVincent Field	1,000	Philadelphia	Pennsylvania	La Salle Explorers	Atlantic 10 Conference (NCAA)
602	Harmon Stadium	1,000	Jacksonville	Florida	North Florida Ospreys	ASUN Conference (NCAA)
603	Jaycees Field	1,000	Nacogdoches	Texas	Stephen F. Austin Lumberjacks	Southland Conference (NCAA)
604	Jerry D. Young Memorial Field	1,000	Birmingham	Alabama	UAB Blazers	Conference USA (NCAA)
605	Jim Houlihan Park at Jack Coffey Field	1,000	New York City	New York	Fordham Rams	Atlantic 10 Conference (NCAA)
606	Joe Lee Griffin Stadium	1,000	Homewood	Alabama	Samford Bulldogs	Southern Conference (NCAA)
607	Joe Nathan Field	1,000	Stony Brook	New York	Stony Brook Seawolves	America East Conference (NCAA)
608	Kamine Stadium	1,000	Forks Township	Pennsylvania	Lafayette Leopards	Patriot League (NCAA)
609	Hiegert Field	1,000	Northridge	California	Cal State Northridge Matadors	Big West Conference (NCAA)
610	McKie Field at Hayden Park	1,000	Oxford	Ohio	Miami RedHawks	Mid-American Conference (NCAA)
611	Murray Stadium	1,000	Providence	Rhode Island	Brown Bears	Ivy League (NCAA)
612	Plumeri Park	1,000	Williamsburg	Virginia	William & Mary Tribe	Coastal Athletic Association (NCAA)
613	Presley Askew Field	1,000	Las Cruces	New Mexico	New Mexico State Aggies	Western Athletic Conference (NCAA)
614	Raymond C. Hand Park	1,000	Clarksville	Tennessee	Austin Peay Governors	United Athletic Conference (NCAA)
615	Santa Ana Star Field	1,000	Albuquerque	New Mexico	New Mexico Lobos	Mountain West Conference (NCAA)
616	Scott Park Baseball Complex	1,000	Toledo	Ohio	Toledo Rockets	Mid-American Conference (NCAA)
617	Sullivan Field	1,000	San Antonio	Texas	Incarnate Word Cardinals	Southland Conference (NCAA)
618	Thomas Stadium	1,000	Johnson City	Tennessee	East Tennessee State Buccaneers	Southern Conference (NCAA)
619	Torii Hunter Baseball Complex	1,000	Pine Bluff	Arkansas	Arkansas–Pine Bluff Golden Lions	Southwestern Athletic Conference (NCAA)
620	Cecil Ballow Baseball Complex	1,000	Stephenville	Texas	Tarleton State Texans	Western Athletic Conference (NCAA)
621	Bullens Field	1,000	Westfield	Massachusetts	Westfield Starfires	Futures Collegiate Baseball League

== See also ==
- List of Major League Baseball stadiums
- List of baseball parks by capacity
- List of NCAA Division I baseball venues
- List of American football stadiums by capacity
- List of soccer stadiums in the United States
- List of U.S. stadiums by capacity
- Lists of stadiums
