= E. J. Block Athletic Field =

E.J. Block Athletic Field East Chicago

Coordinates: 41.633050°N 87.451269°W

E.J. Block Athletic Field
- Interactive map of E.J. Block Athletic Field
- Location: East Chicago, Indiana
- Owner: East Chicago
- Operator: East Chicago Parks Department
- Capacity: Baseball: 3,500
- Field size: Left field - 360 ft Center Field - 385 ft Right field - 320 ft

Construction
- Groundbreaking: 1941
- Opened: May 25, 1942
- Cost: unknown
- Architect: Inland Steel Company

Tenants
- East Chicago Conquistadors (MAL) 1995; Crimson Wave (CCAC) ?-present East Chicago Washington Senators, 1942-1986; East Chicago Central Cardinals, 1987-present East Chicago American Legion Post 266, ?-1994 EC Post 369, ?-present

E.J. Block Athletic Field is a stadium in East Chicago, Indiana that opened in 1942. It is primarily used for amateur and professional baseball, and is the home field of the Calumet College of St. Joseph's Crimson Wave Baseball team which play in the CCAC. It is also the home park of the East Chicago Central High School baseball team and the East Chicago Post 369 American Legion summer baseball team.

== History ==
Block Stadium was dedicated on Memorial Day 1942 and financed by the Block family (owners of the Inland Steel Company) to boost employee morale. They later donated the stadium to the City of East Chicago.

The stadium first served a professional team in 1995 when the independent league East Chicago Conquistadors called it home, for their first and only season. The team's average per game attendance was 94 fans per game.
