= Heartland League =

Defunct American baseball league

Mid-America League
- Sport: Baseball
- Founded: 1995
- Ceased: 1998
- President: Jim Gonzales
- No. of teams: 4 to 8
- Country: United States

The Heartland League was an independent baseball league that operated from 1996 to 1998 in the central United States.

The Heartland League was founded with teams in Lafayette, Indiana; Anderson, Indiana; Will County, Illinois; and Dubois County, Indiana. Lafayette won the championship in 1996. In 1997, the Clarksville Coyotes, Tennessee Tomahawks, and Columbia Mules joined the league from the Big South League. The Altoona Rail Kings also joined the league from the North Atlantic League. The four teams from the previous year remained, giving the league eight teams. In 1997. the league drew over 210,000 fans, more than three times as many fans as in 1996. The league fielded six teams in 1998, but teams in Huntington, West Virginia, and Booneville, Mississippi, suspended operations midway through the season and the league suspended operations after the Cook County Cheetahs jumped to the Frontier League.

The Mid-America League was based in Lafayette, Indiana, and was an independent baseball league located entirely within Indiana. The Mid-America League was the same league as the Heartland League with a different name and the same franchise. The Mid-America League operated in only four cities that were not served by Major or Minor League Baseball teams, and is not affiliated with either.

== MAL Teams ==
Team	City	Stadium
Anderson Lawmen	Anderson, Indiana	Memorial Field
East Chicago Conquistadors	East Chicago, Indiana	E.J. Block Athletic Field
Lafayette Leopards	Lafayette, Indiana	Loeb Stadium
Merrillville Mud Dogs	Merrillville, Indiana	Merrillville H.S. baseball stadium

== See also ==
Independent baseball
