= Kokomo Creek Chubs =

- Logo

Information
- League: Prospect League (Eastern Conference – Northeast Division)
- Location: Kokomo, Indiana
- Ballpark: Kokomo Municipal Stadium
- Founded: 2026
- League championships: 0
- Division championships: 0
- Colors: Navy, teal, silver, white
- Ownership: Bullpen Tournaments, Prep Baseball & Joe Thatcher
- General manager: Matt Howard
- Manager: Jason Taulman
- Website: www.kokomocreekchubs.com/landing/index

The Kokomo Creek Chubs are a collegiate summer league baseball team of the Prospect League. They are located in Kokomo, Indiana, and play their home games at Kokomo Municipal Stadium. The Creek Chubs and other collegiate summer leagues and teams exist to give top college players a professional-like experience without affecting NCAA eligibility.

The Creek Chubs play in the Prospect League's Eastern Conference – Northeast Division along with the Champion City Half Trax, Chillicothe Paints, Johnstown Mill Rats, and Lafayette Aviators.

== History ==
Kokomo's previous team in the Prospect League, the Kokomo Jackrabbits, were members of the league from the franchise's inception in 2014 to 2018, when they left to join the Northwoods League, which they were members of from 2019 to 2024. The Jackrabbits dissolved after the 2024 season due to a legal battle between the city of Kokomo and the ownership of the Jackrabbits, Kokomo Baseball LLC, which ultimately ended with a judge ruling in favor of the city of Kokomo. The ruling officially brought an end to the Jackrabbits.

On October 7, 2025, the Prospect League announced that a new franchise had been awarded to the city of Kokomo, with Bullpen Tournaments, Prep Baseball & former MLB pitcher Joe Thatcher as the owners of the team.

On October 31, 2025, the team was officially named the Creek Chubs.

== Stadium ==
The Creek Chubs play at Kokomo Municipal Stadium, a 4,000-seat facility owned and operated by the city of Kokomo, Indiana.

The facility was built in 2015 and is located at 400 S Union St in Kokomo.

== Seasons ==
Season	Manager	Record	Win %	League	Division	GB	Post-season record	Post-season win %	Post-season result	Notes
2026	Jason Taulman	28–27	.509	T–11th	4th	1.5	0–0	.000	Did not qualify	Inaugural season
Totals		28–27	.509				0–0	.000		

== Roster ==
Kokomo Creek Chubs roster
Active roster	Coaching staff
Pitchers: 34 Luke Albrecht; 3 Ty Anderson; 19 Koen Berry; 12 Braden Branigin; -- Kyle Cortner; 54 Mitchell Dean; 20 Nolan Decker; 44 Donovan Dykas; 21 Jack Dykas; 36 Joe Glander; 26 Aidan Hayse; 50 Drew Jennings; 7 Austin McNabb; 29 Corbin Payne; 37 Calvin Shepherd; 51 Quinten Shewmaker; 41 Corbin Snyder; 23 Nash Wagner; 9 Keegan Waters; Catchers: 27 Lincoln Cardwell; 22 Solen Munson; 8 Jack Taulman; Infielders: 17 John Curl II; 1 Jedvier Garcia; 15 Coulter Hamilton; 33 Drew Helton; 2 Brayden Hibler; 6 Collin Osenbaugh; 30 Stone Powell; 42 Aiden Reynolds; Outfielders: 14 Brayden Bruner; 4 Dane DeWees; 31 Brandon Logan; 5 Evan Russ; 10 Brock Taulman	Manager: -- Jason Taulman; Coaches: TBD; Disabled list; ‡ Inactive list; § Suspended list; updated June 6, 2026
