= Loeb Stadium =

Multi-use stadium in Lafayette, Indiana, US

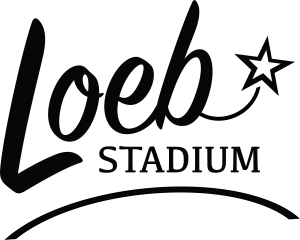

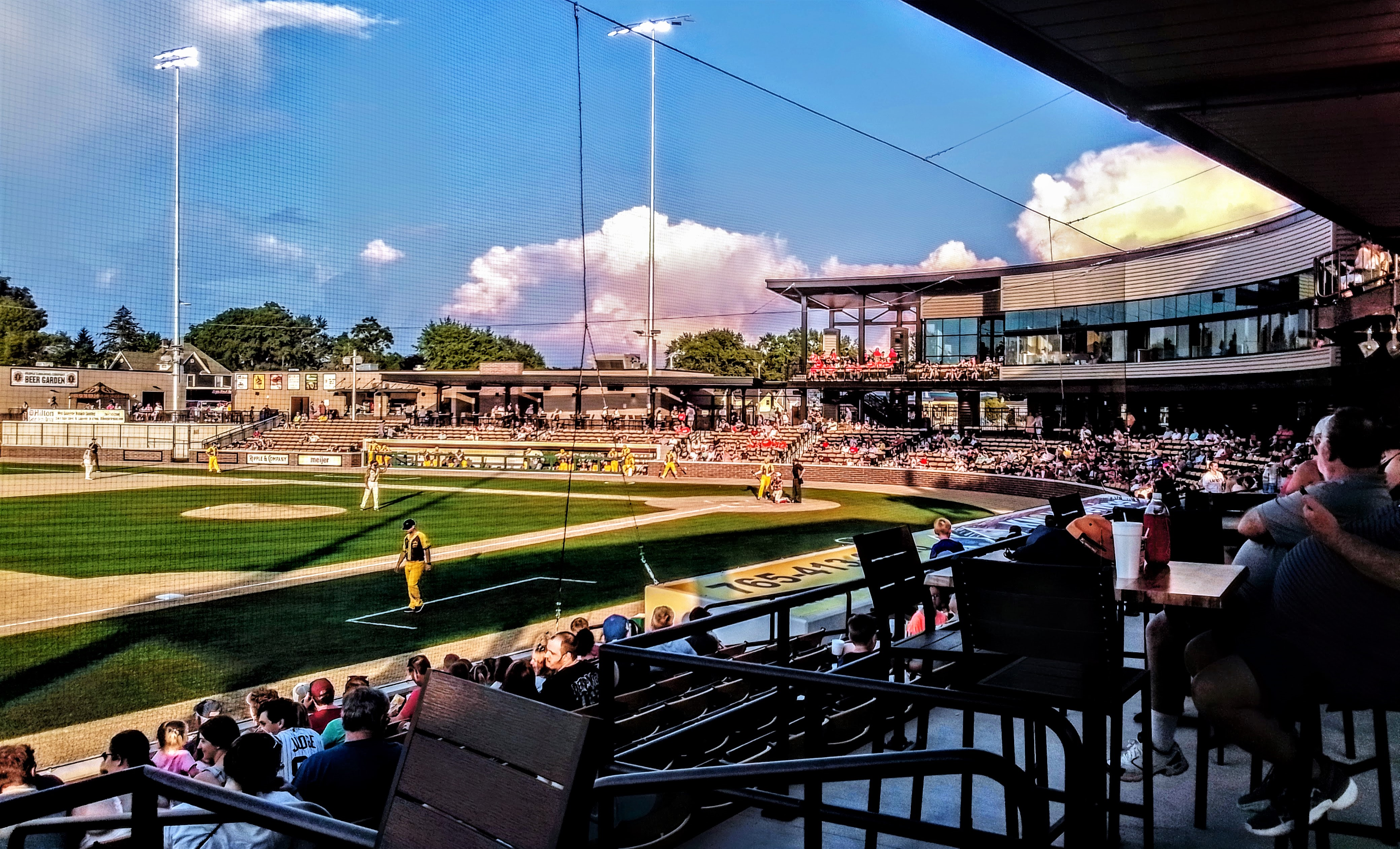

- Location within Indiana Location within the United States
- Interactive map of Loeb Stadium
- Address: Wallace Avenue and Main Street (Columbian Park)
- Location: Lafayette, Indiana
- Coordinates: 40°24′42″N 86°52′18″W
- Capacity: 2,600
- Scoreboard: 24 feet tall, 43 feet wide, 1 million pixel video board

Construction
- Groundbreaking: August 27, 2019
- Opened: March 31, 2021
- Cost: $20 million
- Architect: American Structurepoint
- General contractor: Kettelhut Construction

Tenants
- Lafayette Aviators (PL) 2021–present Jefferson High School Bronchos (IHSAA) 2021–present Black Cat FC (UPSL) 2021

Website
- Official website

Loeb Stadium is a multi-use stadium in Columbian Park in Lafayette, Indiana, United States. It is the home field for the Lafayette Aviators, a collegiate summer baseball team in the Prospect League, and for the Jefferson High School Bronchos baseball team. It was the home for Black Cat FC in the United Premier Soccer League during their 2021 season. Opened in 2021, Loeb Stadium has a capacity of 2,600 people.

== Previous stadium ==
The previous Loeb Stadium, standing at the same location from 1940 to 2019, was also home to the Aviators and the Bronchos. At the conclusion of the 2019 Prospect League season, the old stadium was closed and demolished to make way for construction of the current stadium.

== Construction ==
The $20 million project was paid for using economic development income tax (EDIT) rather than property taxes. The old stadium's configuration was flipped, placing home plate in what had been center field. The previous seating area was removed and made part of Columbian Park. New suites and outdoor group seating areas were added. The stadium's grass playing surface was replaced with a synthetic turf, allowing for additional types of events, and the playing surface was lowered by seven feet, allowing for improved sightlines from all stadium seats. The seating capacity was decreased from 3,500 to 2,600.

== History ==
Loeb Stadium opened on March 31, 2021, with its first event being a men's baseball game between Jefferson High School and Central Catholic. In the stadium's first year, the Aviators played for the league championship at home, losing to the Cape Catfish on August 12, 2021. The first soccer game at Loeb Stadium was played on August 18, 2021, between the women's teams of Jefferson High School and Central Catholic.
