= Champion City Half Trax =

American collegiate baseball team

- Logo

Information
- League: Prospect League (Eastern Conference – Northeast Division)
- Location: Springfield, Ohio
- Ballpark: Carleton Davidson Stadium
- Founded: 2009 (as the Slippery Rock Sliders)
- League championships: 0
- Division championships: 1 (2021)
- Former name: Champion City Kings (2014–2025); Slippery Rock Sliders (2009–2013)
- Colors: Blue, red, white
- General manager: Danny Leach
- Manager: DJ Neff
- Website: https://www.championcityhalftrax.com/landing/index

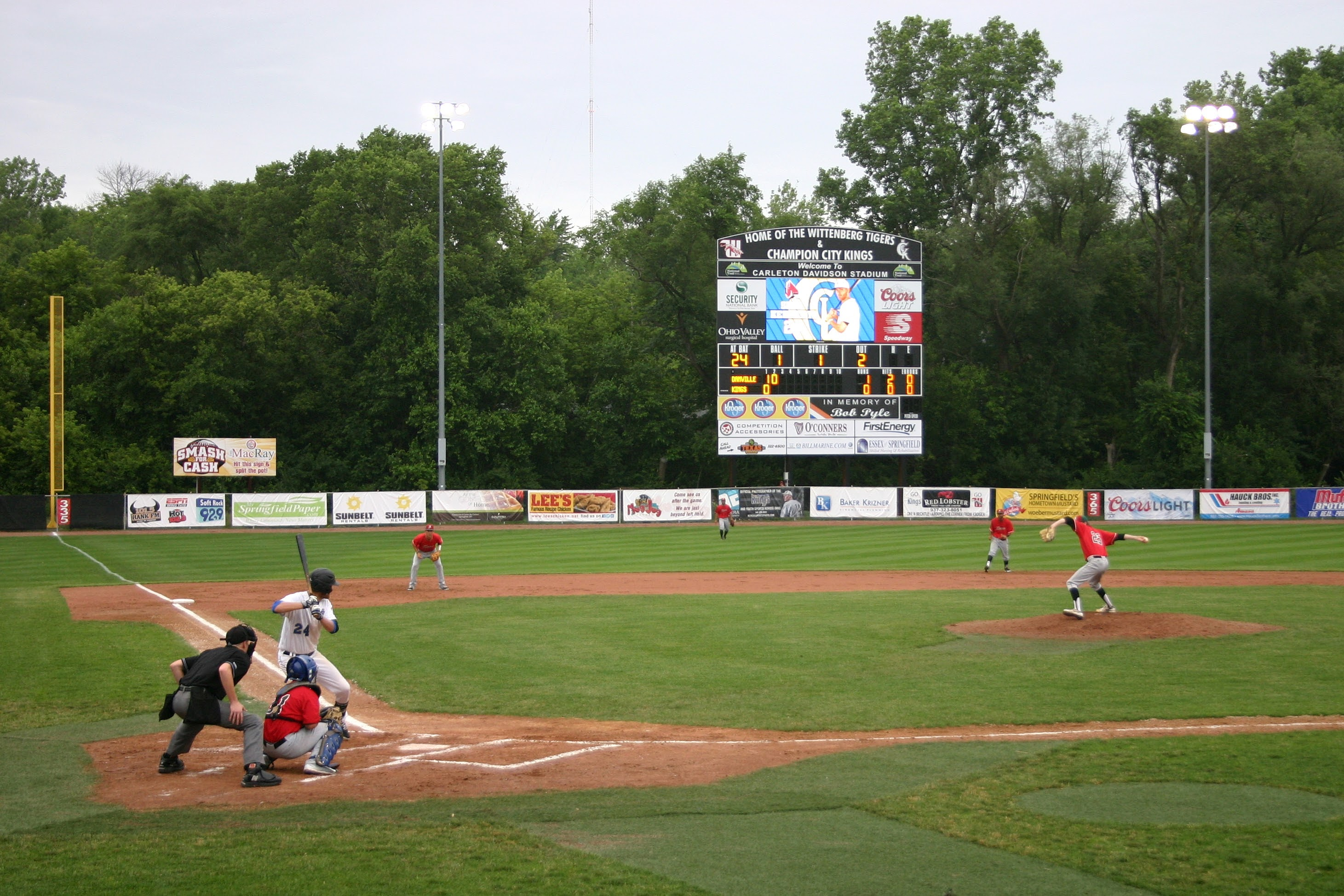
The Champion City Kings host the Danville Dans at Carleton Davidson Stadium in Springfield, Ohio on June 18, 2015

The Champion City Half Trax are a college summer baseball team located in Springfield, Ohio. The Half Trax are a member of the wood-bat Prospect League and have been since 2013. The Kings play at Carleton Davidson Stadium, which is also the home of the NCAA DIII Wittenberg University Tigers.

The Half Trax are led by General Manager Danny Leach and Field Manager DJ Neff.

The franchise was previously located in Slippery Rock, PA and was known as the Sliders prior to relocating to Ohio in time for the 2014 season. The Sliders were originally a member of the Frontier League, but left the league after the 2007 season, its only year as a member.

After the 2025 season, the franchise would change its name from the Kings to the Half Trax.

The Half Trax play in the Prospect League's Eastern Conference – Northeast Division along with the Chillicothe Paints, Johnstown Mill Rats, Kokomo Creek Chubs, and Lafayette Aviators.

== Seasons ==
Season	Manager	Record	Win %	Division	GB	Post-season record	Post-season win %	Post-season result	Notes
2007	Greg Jelks	29–66	.305	4th	26.0	0–0	.000	Did not qualify	
2008	Ceased operations for one season								
2009	Chase Rowe	22–31	.415	5th	7.5	0–0	.000	Did not qualify	As the Slippery Rock Sliders
2010	Andy Chalot	21–33	.389	4th	17.0	0–0	.000	Did not qualify	
2011	Andy Chalot/Jon Rodriguez	26–29	.473	3rd	2.5	0–1	.000	Lost East Division Championship (West Virginia)	Made playoffs as 1st Half East Division champion
2012	Shawn Pynn	20–40	.333	5th	20.5	0–0	.000	Did not qualify	
2013	Brett Neffendorf	28–32	.467	4th	10.0	0–0	.000	Did not qualify	Final season in Slippery Rock
2014	Brett Neffendorf	21–39	.350	5th	19.0	0–0	.000	Did not qualify	First season as the Kings
2015	Chris Perkovich	24–35	.407	5th	13.5	0–0	.000	Did not qualify	
2016	Rick White	27–33	.450	5th	7.5	0–0	.000	Did not qualify	
2017	Mike Ruechel	29–29	.500	3rd	7.0	0–0	.000	Did not qualify	
2018	Arthur Stenberg	26–33	.441	5th	11.0	0–0	.000	Did not qualify	
2019	John Jeanes	25–34	.424	5th	14.5	0–0	.000	Did not qualify	
2020	Season cancelled (COVID-19 pandemic)								
2021	Gavin Murphy	28–30	.483	2nd	7.0	1–1	.500	Won Ohio River Valley Division Championship (Chillicothe); Lost Eastern Conference Championship (Lafayette)	Made playoffs with 2nd best 2nd half record
2022	Gavin Murphy	23–34	.404	3rd	13.5	0–0	.000	Did not qualify	
2023	Gavin Murphy	29–29	.500	2nd	12.0	0–1	.000	Lost Ohio River Valley Division Championship (Chillicothe)	
2024	Stephen Larkin	18–38	.321	4th	18.0	0–0	.000	Did not qualify	
2025	Stephen Larkin	20–35	.364	4th	14.5	0–0	.000	Did not qualify	Final season as the Kings
2026	DJ Neff	27–28	.491	5th	2.5	0–0	.000	Did not qualify	First season as the Half Trax
Totals		443–628	.414			1–3	.250		

== Roster ==
Champion City Half Trax roster
Active roster	Coaching staff
Pitchers: 30 Karson Adkins; 14 Caleb Boff; 28 Landon Bowden; 34 Cam Brewer; 11 Zach Cabell; 44 Logan Cobb; 22 Abe Crall; 25 Nicholas Dolbin; 9 Joey Frisk; 18 Mason Lang; 35 Joseph Mossbarger; 36 Riley Niggemeyer; 45 Hunter Richardson; 38 Matt Ritter; 26 Jackson Saylor; 17 James Urwin; 40 Landon Vandergrift; 13 Miles Whitesell; 31 Braden Williams; Utility players: 5 Hunter Fryman; Catchers: 43 Jaxon Brown; 10 Noah Cassell; 19 Jayden Jaramillo; 7 Dane Perry; Infielders: 39 Asa Dunlevey; -- Alex Laird; 16 Ethan Norris; 37 Derek Occhipinti; 42 Elijah Schroeder; 29 Ian Shipley; 33 Simon Slapeta; 1 Baxter Tedesco; 20 Landon Turner; Outfielders: 41 Dominic Bouscher; 32 Justin Bried; 12 Cody Croxford; 24 Micah Geise; 21 Nate Lloyd; 23 Luke McClure; 3 Miguel Nixon	Manager: -- DJ Neff; Coaches: -- Mark Lucas (assistant); -- Andrew Patrick (assistant); -- Charlie Schafer (assistant); Disabled list; ‡ Inactive list; § Suspended list; updated June 6, 2026
