= Don Edwards Park =

Baseball complex in Newark, Ohio

Coordinates: 40°03′15″N 82°23′01″W

Don Edwards Park is a five field baseball complex located in Newark, Ohio, built in 1963. It hosted a semi-professional league team the Newark Buffalos/Bison in 1994 and in 1995. And is currently home to the Ohio Bison of the Great Lakes Summer Collegiate League. Don Edwards Park has served as the host site for nine Babe Ruth World Series events. The Park has hosted a multitude of tournaments over the years. The facility is currently owned by the City of Newark and operated by the Buckeye Valley Family YMCA.

https://www.facebook.com/DonEdwardsPark/

Events and tenants
Preceded by V.A. Memorial Stadium	Host of the FL All-Star Game; Don Edwards Park; 1994	Succeeded by Point Stadium
