= Loeb Stadium (1940) =

Demolished stadium in Indiana, US

- Location within Indiana Location within the United States
- Interactive map of Loeb Stadium
- Former names: Columbian Park Recreational Center (1940–1971)
- Address: Wallace Avenue and Main Street (Columbian Park)
- Location: Lafayette, Indiana
- Coordinates: 40.412597°N 86.871568°W
- Capacity: 3,500

Construction
- Built: 1940
- Opened: 1940
- Demolished: September 4, 2019
- Architect: Walter Scholer
- Builder: H.G. Christman Co.

Tenants
- Lafayette Aviators (PL) 2016–2019; Jefferson High School Bronchos (IHSAA) 1941–2019; Ohio Valley Redcoats (FL) 2005; Lafayette Leopards (GrCL) 1994; Lafayette Red Sox (ML) 1956–1957; Lafayette Chiefs (MOVL) 1955

Website
- Official website

Loeb Stadium was a stadium in Columbian Park in Lafayette, Indiana, United States. It was primarily used for baseball and had most recently been the home of the Lafayette Aviators of the Prospect League.

Previously, it was the home of Ohio Valley Redcoats of the independent Frontier League, and later the Lafayette Leopards of the now defunct Great Central League.

== History ==
Opened in 1940 as Columbian Park Recreational Center, Loeb Stadium had a capacity of 3,500 people. From 1943 until 1945, the stadium hosted Spring training for Major League Baseball's Cleveland Indians when teams were forced to hold their training closer to their home cities due to restrictions in place as a result of the United States' participation in World War II. At that time, the stadium was home to a Class A affiliate of the Indians.

It also hosted the minor league Lafayette Red Sox, a founding franchise of the Midwest League in 1956. In 1957, the Red Sox moved to Waterloo, Iowa, and later to Lansing, Michigan, where they are known today as the Lansing Lugnuts.

In amateur baseball, it was home to the Colt League Baseball World Series 48 out of 49 years (1969–1971 and 1973–2017) until the event moved to Rent One Park in Marion, Illinois in 2018. The Jefferson High School Bronchos used the stadium for their home games, competing in games sanctioned by the Indiana High School Athletic Association (IHSAA). It hosted the IHSAA baseball state finals four times, lastly in 2005.

For the 2016 season, the Jamestown Jammers moved to Lafayette and began play in the Prospect League as the Aviators.

== Replacement ==
At the conclusion of the 2019 Prospect League season, the stadium was closed and demolished to make way for a new Loeb Stadium which opened March 31, 2021. The Aviators were supposed to play the 2020 season at Purdue University's Alexander Field; however, their 2020 season was suspended when Purdue closed their athletic facilities due to the COVID-19 pandemic.

The project, at a cost of $20 million, saw the stadium's configuration flipped, placing home plate in what had been center field. The original seating area was removed and made part of Columbian Park surrounding the stadium. New suites and outdoor group seating areas were added. The stadium's grass playing surface was replaced with a synthetic turf to allow the facility to host additional types of events, and the seating capacity was decreased from 3,500 to 2,600. Additionally, the playing surface was lowered by seven feet, allowing for improved sightlines from all stadium seats. The project was paid for using economic development income tax (EDIT) rather than property taxes.
