= Lafayette Aviators =

- Logo

Information
- League: Prospect League (Eastern Conference – Northeast Division)
- Location: Lafayette, Indiana
- Ballpark: Loeb Stadium
- Founded: 2015
- League championships: 1 (2017)
- Division championships: 4 (2017, 2021, 2025, 2026)
- Former name: Jamestown Jammers (2015)
- Former ballpark(s): Loeb Stadium (1940) (2016–2019); Russell Diethrick Park (2015)
- Colors: Navy, gold, white
- Ownership: National Sports Services
- General manager: Danny Shingleton
- Manager: Jamie Sailors
- Website: lafayettebaseball.com

The Lafayette Aviators are a summer collegiate baseball team based in Lafayette, Indiana. They are a member of the Eastern Conference of the summer collegiate Prospect League. The Aviators play at Loeb Stadium in Columbian Park in Lafayette, which opened in May 2021.

The Aviators won their first Prospect League championship in 2017, defeating the Butler BlueSox in a best-of-3 series.

The Aviators play in the Prospect League's Eastern Conference – Northeast Division along with the Champion City Half Trax, Chillicothe Paints, Johnstown Mill Rats, and Kokomo Creek Chubs.

== History ==
The Aviators franchise was originally based in Jamestown, New York, where it operated as the Jamestown Jammers during the 2015 season. The Jammers' owners, Milwaukee, Wisconsin-based MKE Sports & Entertainment, opted to move its Prospect League team to Lafayette and establish a new Jammers team in the Perfect Game Collegiate Baseball League in 2016, with distance (Jamestown was well outside the Prospect League's Midwestern footprint while the PCPBL's footprint was much closer, in Central New York) being cited as the primary reason for the move.

Prior to the 2018 season, the team was sold to National Sports Services, through its subsidiary, Lafayette Family Entertainment LLC.

The Aviators were supposed to play their 2020 season at Purdue University's Alexander Field while the original Loeb Stadium was torn down and replaced by a new ballpark; however, the season was suspended when Purdue closed their athletic facilities due to the COVID-19 pandemic.

The team was finally able to welcome spectators to their season opener at their new stadium on June 1, 2021.

== Seasons ==
Season	Manager	Record	Win %	Division	GB	Post-season record	Post-season win %	Post-season result	Notes
2015	Anthony Barone	27–33	.450	4th	11.0	0–0	.000	Did not qualify	First and only season as the Jamestown Jammers
2016	Brent McNeil	30–30	.500	3rd	5.0	0–0	.000	Did not qualify	First season as the Lafayette Aviators
2017	Brent McNeil	36–24	.600	1st	–	4–2	.667	Won West Division Championship (Terre Haute); Won Prospect League Championship (Butler)	Moved to West Division
2018	Will Arnold	22–38	.367	6th	14.0	0–0	.000	Did not qualify	
2019	Brent McNeil	34–26	.567	6th	6.0	0–0	.000	Did not qualify	
2020	Bailey Montgomery	Season cancelled (COVID-19 pandemic)							
2021	Michael Keeran	41–18	.695	1st	–	3–2	.600	Won Wabash River Division Championship (Danville); Won East Conference Championship (Champion City); Lost Prospect League Championship (Cape)	
2022	Chris Willsey	25–34	.424	4th	16.0	0–0	.000	Did not qualify	
2023	Jamie Sailors	28–29	.491	3rd	12.5	0–0	.000	Did not qualify	
2024	Jamie Sailors	26–30	.464	2nd	10.0	0–0	.000	Did not qualify	
2025	Jamie Sailors	35–21	.625	1st	–	2–2	.500	Won Northeast Division Championship (Johnstown); Won Eastern Conference Championship (Terre Haute); Lost Prospect League Championship (Cape)	
2026	Jamie Sailors	29–26	.527	2nd	0.5	1–1	.500	Won Northeast Division Championship (Chillicothe); Lost Eastern Conference Championship (Terre Haute)	
Totals		333–309	.519			10–7	.588		

== Roster ==
Lafayette Aviators roster
Active roster	Coaching staff
Pitchers: -- Carter Beck; 4 Drake Branson; 10 Alex Brew; 12 Kendall Brewer; -- Cash Dabbs; 14 Matt Dill; 40 Dylan Goltl; 11 Jackson Gwin; -- Cameron Heaney; 16 Bradley Janes; 17 Tyler Kidwell; 33 Ben Mazur; 27 Brady McCleery; 34 Talan Meyers; 18 Harrison Miller; 32 Owen Norris; 19 Benjamin Rohrbach; 39 Aiden Steht; 20 Jon Wylie; Catchers: 2 Sage Adams; 23 Jack Ferguson; 22 Kadyn Martinez; 15 Zack Pelletier; Infielders: 35 Blake Bowen; 36 Gabe Boyd; 6 Bo Caraway Jr.; -- Luke Collier; 21 Diego Frey; 38 Dean Hannah; 37 Isaac Incinelli; 24 Gavin Smith; Outfielders: 25 Drew Potts; 26 Rodney Rachel; 7 Ryan Valdes	Manager: -- Jamie Sailors; Coaches: -- Brandon Daniels (assistant); -- Nate Lambdin (assistant); Disabled list; ‡ Inactive list; § Suspended list; updated June 6, 2026
