= Carleton Davidson Stadium =

Stadium in Springfield, Ohio, US

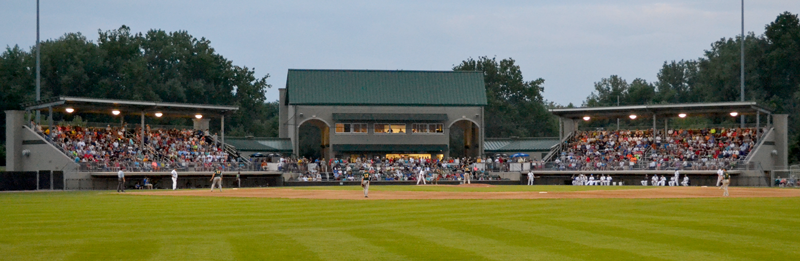

- Location within Ohio Location within the United States
- Interactive map of Carleton Davidson Stadium
- Address: 1101 Mitchell Blvd. Springfield, Ohio; United States
- Coordinates: 39°56′20.1″N 83°47′16.8″W
- Capacity: 1,077
- Surface: Grass
- Field size: Left field: 320 ft (98 m); Left center: 350 ft (110 m); Center field: 390 ft (120 m); Right center: 350 ft (110 m); Right field: 320 ft (98 m)

Construction
- Built: 2003–2004
- Opened: April 24, 2004

Tenants
- Wittenberg Tigers (NCAA) 2004–present; Champion City Kings/Champion City Half Trax (PL) 2014–present

Carleton Davidson Stadium is a stadium in Springfield, Ohio. It is used for collegiate level baseball by the Wittenberg University Tigers and the Champion City Kings. The facility holds 1,077 people. The stadium is considered to be a pitcher's park with the dimensions of 390 to center, 350 to the power alleys, and 320 down the lines. Built in 2003 and 2004, the stadium was dedicated on April 23, 2004, and hosted its first game the next day.
