= Alexander Field (Purdue University) =

Baseball venue in West Lafayette, Indiana, US

- Location within Indiana Location within the United States
- Interactive map of Alexander Field
- Full name: John and Anna Margaret Ross Alexander Field
- Address: McCormick Road and Cherry Lane; West Lafayette, Indiana, USA
- Coordinates: 40.437312°N 86.941646°W
- Owner: Purdue University
- Operator: Purdue University
- Capacity: 1,500 (expandable to 2,500)
- Surface: Natural grass
- Scoreboard: Electronic
- Field size: Left Field - 340 ft (100 m); Left Center - 368 ft (112 m); Center Field - 408 ft (124 m); Right Center - 369 ft (112 m); Right Field - 330 ft (100 m)

Construction
- Groundbreaking: 2011
- Built: 2011–2012
- Opened: 2013
- Cost: $10.3 million
- Architect: Cooke Douglass Farr Lemons

Tenants
- Purdue Boilermakers (Big Ten) 2013–present Lafayette Aviators (PL) 2020

Alexander Field is a baseball venue in West Lafayette, Indiana, United States. It is home to the Purdue Boilermakers baseball team of the NCAA Division I Big Ten Conference. The field hosted its first game in spring 2013. The venue has a capacity of 1,500 spectators that is expandable to 2,500 spectators. It is named for John and Anna Margaret Ross Alexander, Purdue alumni and the parents of former Purdue head baseball coach Dave Alexander

== History ==
Construction began following the 2011 season, and the venue was scheduled to be completed for the start of the 2012 season. However, construction delays pushed back the field's completion to spring 2013. Due to the delays, Purdue, which was selected to host a regional in the 2012 NCAA tournament, had to host the regional at U.S. Steel Yard in nearby Gary.

It replaced Lambert Field as the home of the Boilermakers.

With Loeb Stadium demolished to make way for a new stadium still under construction, the Lafayette Aviators were supposed to play the 2020 Prospect League season at Alexander Field; however, their season was suspended when Purdue closed its athletic facilities due to the COVID-19 pandemic.

== Features ==
The stadium features a press box, clubhouse, indoor hitting facility, suites and stadium lighting.

== See also ==
- List of NCAA Division I baseball venues
