= Johnstown Mill Rats =

American collegiate baseball team

- Logo

Information
- League: Prospect League (Eastern Conference – Northeast Division)
- Location: Johnstown, Pennsylvania
- Ballpark: Point Stadium
- Founded: 2020
- League championships: 0
- Division championships: 0
- Colors: Brown, gold, white
- Ownership: Johnstown Family Entertainment, LLC / National Sports Services (NSS)
- General manager: Sarah Finlay
- Manager: Tyler Smith
- Website: millrats.com

The Johnstown Mill Rats are a collegiate summer baseball team based in Johnstown, Pennsylvania. They are a member of the East Conference of the summer collegiate Prospect League. The Mill Rats were founded in 2020 and began play at Point Stadium in 2021.

The Mill Rats play in the Prospect League's Eastern Conference – Northeast Division along with the Champion City Half Trax, Chillicothe Paints, Kokomo Creek Chubs, and Lafayette Aviators.

== Season-by-season record ==
Johnstown Mill Rats
Season	League	Conference	Division	Record	Win%	Finish	GB	Postseason	Manager	Ref
2021	Prospect	East	Ohio River Valley	24–34	.414	3rd	11.0	Did not qualify	Parker Lynn	
2022	Prospect	Eastern	Ohio River Valley	29–31	.483	2nd	9.0	Lost Ohio River Valley Division Championship (Chillicothe)	Tyler Sullivan	
2023	Prospect	Eastern	Ohio River Valley	24–34	.414	4th	17.0	Did not qualify	Tyler Sullivan	
2024	Prospect	Eastern	Northeast	26–30	.464	2nd	10.0	Lost Northeast Division Championship (Chillicothe)	Josh Merrill	
2025	Prospect	Eastern	Northeast	26–29	.473	2nd	8.5	Lost Northeast Division Championship (Lafayette)	Sean Stevens	
2026	Prospect	Eastern	Northeast	27–25	.519	3rd	1.0	Did not qualify	Tyler Smith	

== Roster ==
Johnstown Mill Rats roster
Active roster	Coaching staff
Pitchers: 38 Blake Bullis; 21 JayJay Calmes; 3 Alex Dvorak; 36 Nolan Green; 47 Jason Hall; 37 Grayson Headon; 18 Nathan Holowka; 29 Bennett Johnson; 12 Kyle Kearns; 31 Cole Kuszak; 16 Mason Miles; 20 Kyle Moczygemba; 1 Ian Moore; 40 Connor O'Neil; 7 Caleb Rey; 23 Dane Rodgers; 13 Landen Rozich; 25 Reece Rupert; 50 Grant Shearer; 35 Caden Sivrich; 34 Jonathan Stoeckle; 39 Tyler Suttner; 30 Dyllan Thiebaud; 28 Owen Wilfong; Catchers: 6 Tobin Bigham; 2 Brock Budacki; -- Sergio DeCello; 48 Jake Paczkowski; Infielders: 22 Matt Gardner; 17 Trey Gardner; 4 Hudson Hartgrove; 15 Ty Marsh; 19 Logan Martin; 5 Caleb Smith; Outfielders: 33 Cole Edmondson; 27 Tanner Jacobson; 24 Austin Lafferty; 8 Jack Newman; 11 Caden Throneberry	Manager: -- Tyler Smith; Coaches: -- Rick Pitzer (hitting); -- Jon Tessier (pitching); Disabled list; ‡ Inactive list; § Suspended list; updated June 5, 2026
