= Point Stadium =

Baseball stadium

- The Point
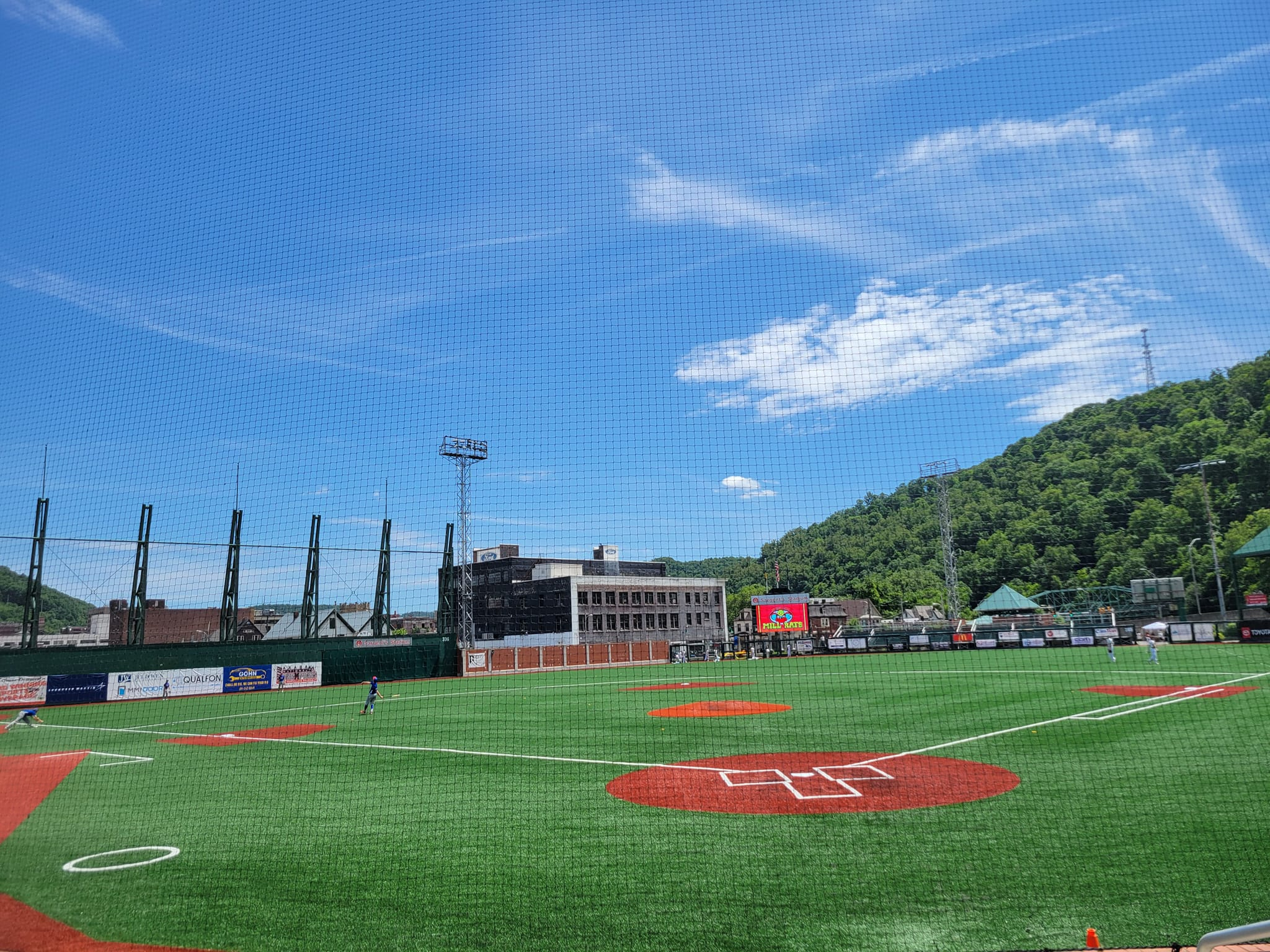

- Location within Pennsylvania Location within the United States
- Interactive map of Point Stadium
- Full name: Sargent's Stadium at the Point
- Address: 100 Johns St. Johnstown, PA 15901
- Location: Johnstown, Pennsylvania
- Coordinates: 40.329°N 78.925°W
- Elevation: 1,150 feet (350 m)
- Owner: City of Johnstown
- Capacity: 7,500 (2008–present)
- Surface: Grass (1926–2006); Artificial turf (2007–2021); FieldTurf (2021–present)
- Field size: Left Field: 290 ft (88 m); L. Center: 336 ft (102 m); Center: 409 ft (125 m); R. Center: 395 ft (120 m); Right Field: 290 ft (88 m)

Construction
- Groundbreaking: November 1925
- Opened: July 5, 1926
- Renovated: 2005; 2021
- Cost: $8 million (renovation)

Tenants
- Johnstown Johnnies (MAL/PSA/MAL/EL) 1926–1942, 1946–1950, 1955–1956; AAABA World Series 1946–present Johnstown Red Sox (EL) 1961; Johnstown Steal/Johnnies (FL) 1995–2002; Johnstown Mill Rats (PL) 2021–present

Website
- Sargents Stadium | City of Johnstown PA

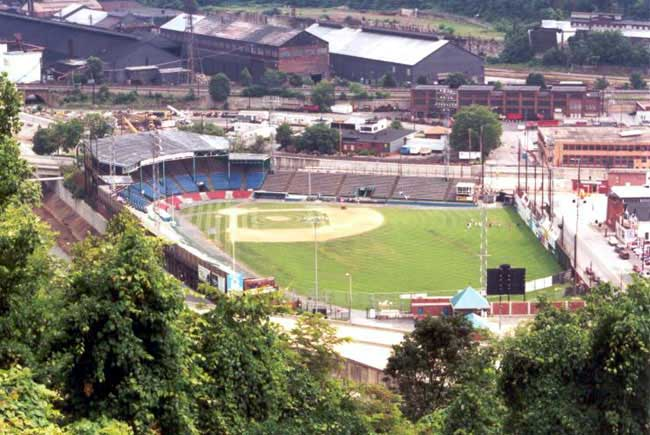
Original Point Stadium

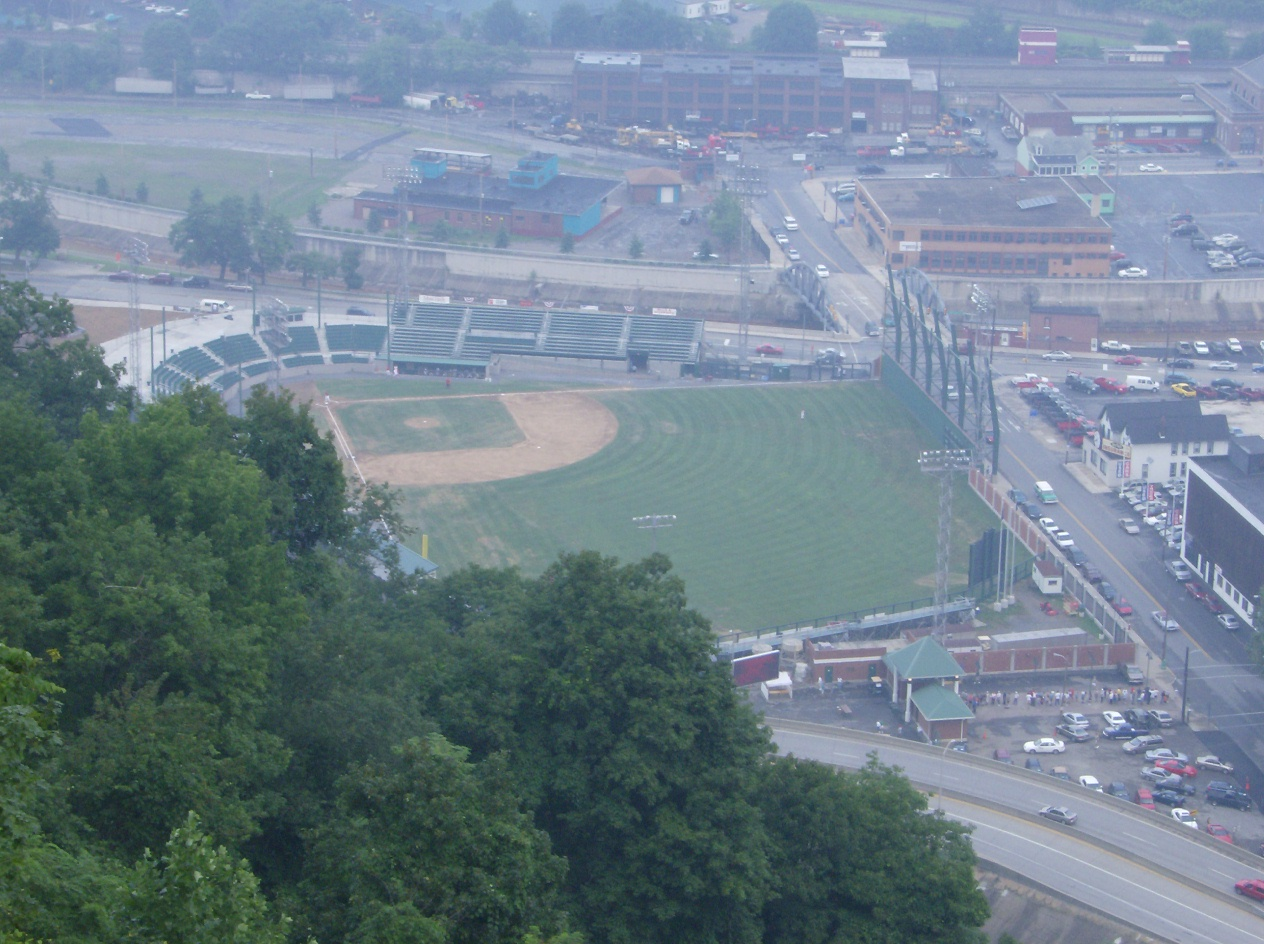
Point Stadium in 2006 before installation of artificial turf

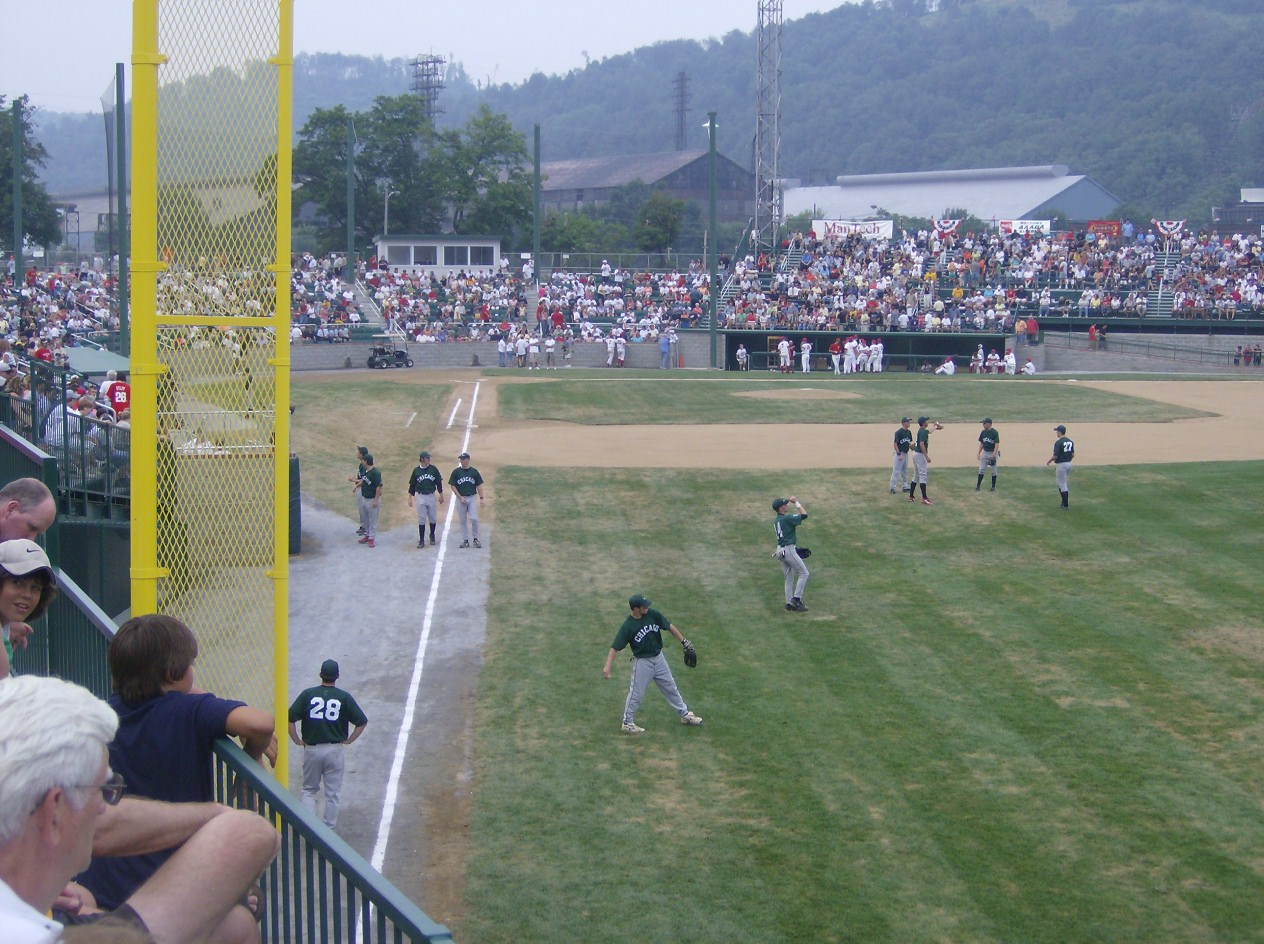
From right-field bleachers before installation of artificial turf

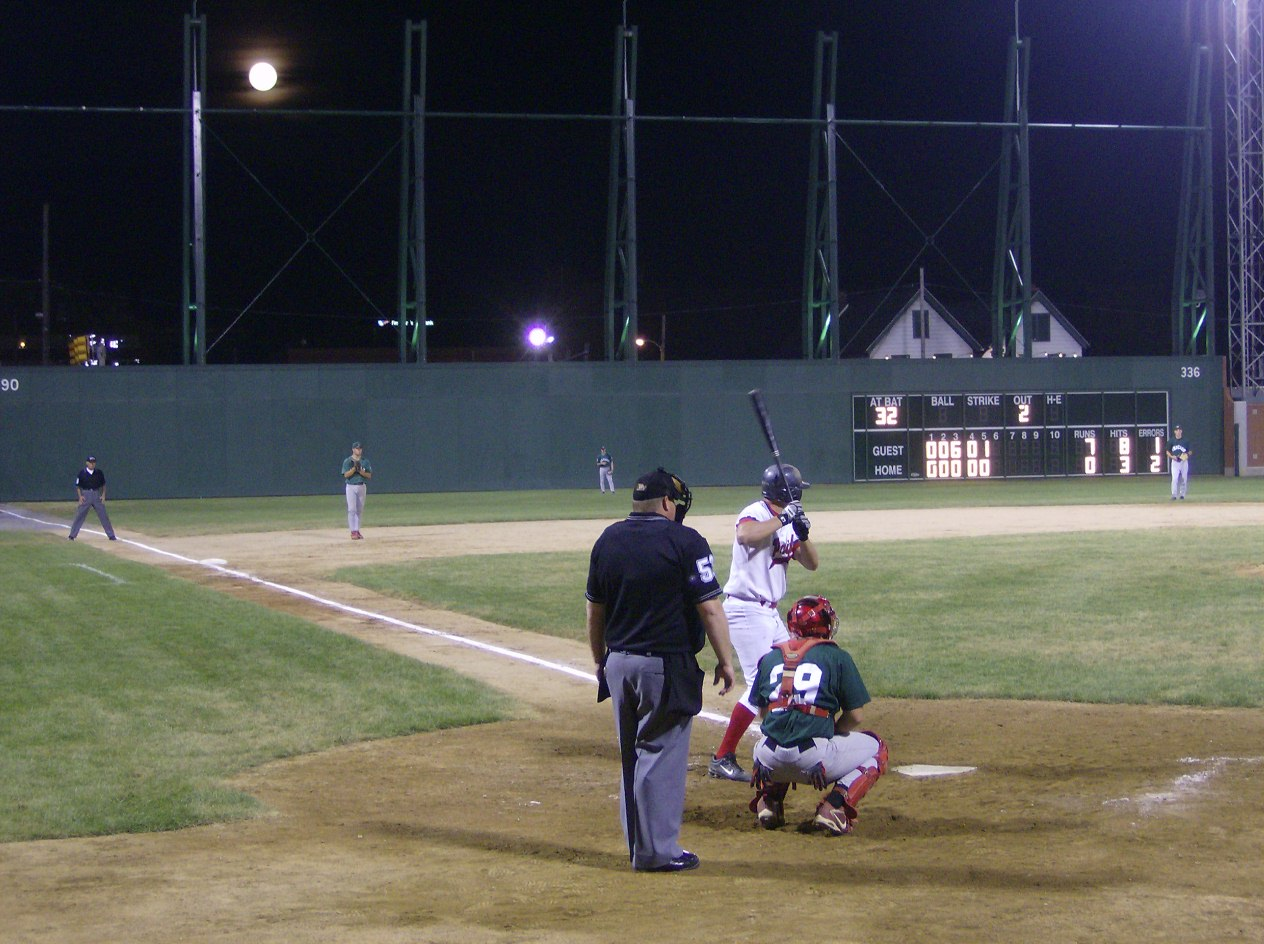
Left-field screen before installation of artificial turf

Sargent's Stadium at the Point is a baseball park in the eastern United States, located in Johnstown, Pennsylvania. The "Point" refers to its location at the confluence of the Little Conemaugh, Stonycreek, and Conemaugh rivers. It is home to the annual All-American Amateur Baseball Association (AAABA) national baseball tournament and the University of Pittsburgh at Johnstown's NCAA Division II college baseball team. It is also a venue for football and select soccer games, primarily at the high school level. The Johnstown Mill Rats, a collegiate summer baseball team in the Prospect League, began play at Point Stadium in 2021.

== Original stadium ==
The original stadium opened in 1926 with a capacity of 17,000. The stadium featured an upper-deck on top of the grandstand. The Greater Johnstown High School football team regularly sold out the Point for their rivalry games against Windber High School and Altoona Area High School. The upper grandstand was later removed and capacity was reduced to 10,000. It was the home of many minor-league baseball teams and the All-American Amateur Baseball Association (AAABA) World Series baseball tournament.

The original Point Stadium had unusual field dimensions: fitted into a rectangular city block next to the Conemaugh River, it was 251 feet (77 m) down the right-field line and 262 feet (80 m) down the left-field line, but bulged out to over 400 feet (122 m) in center field, depending on the location of a snow fence which cut off the furthest reaches of the stadium in right center field. Huge nets were put in left field to keep balls in play, preventing easy home runs, and also to stop balls from reaching the adjacent street.

The original Point Stadium's dimensions (1926–2002)

- Left Field Line: 262 feet (80 m)
- Center Field: 385 feet (117 m)
- Right Field Line: 251 feet (77 m)

== Current stadium ==
After nearly eight decades, the original structure was torn down in 2005 to make room for an $8 million renovation. The new 7,500-seat venue opened on August 8, 2006, for a game between Johnstown and Chicago in the annual AAABA National Tournament. Bishop McCort High School plays its home football and baseball games here, along with select soccer matches. Sportexe artificial turf was installed before the 2007 AAABA National Tournament. The turf was replaced once again after the 2021 AAABA National Tournament with fieldturf.

The original scoreboard located in center field was replaced in the spring of 2021 with a new video scoreboard. A new Daktronics line scoreboard was installed into the left field wall prior to the 2023 Prospect League Season.

The current dimensions

- Left Field Line: 290 feet (88 m)
- Left Center Field: 336 feet (102 m)
- Center Field: 409 feet (125 m)
- Right Center Field: 395 feet (120 m)
- Right Field Line: 290 feet (88 m)

The diamond has an unorthodox southeasterly alignment (home plate to center field). The recommended orientation is east-northeast. The football field runs along the first base line, but not parallel, with a near north-south alignment (slightly NE-SW). The approximate elevation is 1,150 feet (350 m) above sea level.

=== AAABA Hall of Fame ===
Point Stadium is home to the AAABA Hall of Fame which was established in the stadium in 1994.

== UPJ Mountain Cats ==
Point Stadium is the home stadium for the University of Pittsburgh at Johnstown Mountain Cats college baseball team, an NCAA Division II program that competes in the Pennsylvania State Athletic Conference (PSAC). Prior to joining the PSAC in 2013–14, UPJ competed as a member of the West Virginia Intercollegiate Athletic Conference and hosted that conference's baseball championship tournament at Point Stadium in the 2008, 2009, 2010, and 2012 seasons. The Pennsylvania State Athletic Conference also held its conference baseball tournament at the stadium in 2010 and 2011.

== Truman visit ==
During the last weeks of the presidential campaign in October 1948, President Harry Truman gave a major speech at the stadium.

== Popular culture ==
The movie All The Right Moves was filmed in Johnstown and featured Tom Cruise, Craig T. Nelson, and Lea Thompson. The high school football game scenes were shot at Point Stadium in the spring of 1983.

Bon Jovi played the stadium's only concert on June 16, 1989, as part of their Jersey Syndicate Tour with opener Skid Row.

== Pittsburgh Steelers practices ==
The Pittsburgh Steelers have used the stadium for in-season practices and workouts, the last time being during the 1987 strike season.

Events and tenants
Preceded by Don Edwards Park	Host of the FL All-Star Game; Point Stadium; 1995	Succeeded by Don McBride Stadium
