= O'Fallon Hoots =

- Logo

Information
- League: Prospect League (Western Conference – South Division)
- Location: O'Fallon, Missouri
- Ballpark: CarShield Field
- Founded: 2018
- League championships: 0
- Division championships: 0
- Former name: Hannibal Hoots (2018–2019)
- Former ballpark: Clemens Field
- Colors: Black, dark gray, gold, white
- Ownership: Rick DeStefane
- General manager: Brendan Saak
- Manager: Carter Mize
- Website: ofallonhoots.com

The O'Fallon Hoots are a collegiate summer league baseball team in the Prospect League based in O'Fallon, Missouri.

The team played the 2018 and 2019 seasons as the Hannibal Hoots, but only one of those seasons saw them use Hannibal, Missouri as their home; flooding of their stadium led the Hoots to play their 2019 home schedule in nearby Quincy, Illinois at the home stadium of the Quincy Gems. Following the 2019 season, the Hoots moved to O'Fallon and CarShield Field after the departure of the River City Rascals from O'Fallon. The Hannibal Hoots formed in late 2017. and were an expansion franchise for the 2018 season. The Hoots and other collegiate summer leagues and teams exist to give top college players professional-like experience without affecting NCAA eligibility.

On September 26, 2019, The Prospect League announced that the franchise would relocate from Hannibal to O'Fallon beginning with the 2020 season, playing their home games at CarShield Field.

The Hoots play in the Prospect League's Western Conference – South Division along with the Alton River Dragons, Cape Catfish, Jackson Rockabillys, and Thrillville Thrillbillies.

In 2025, the O’Fallon Hoots had an historic season which included the best regular season record (41-15) and longest win streak (17) in Prospect League history.

== History ==
Hannibal's previous team in the Prospect League, the Hannibal Cavemen, suspended operations after the 2016 season, leaving the city without a team for the 2017 season. The league awarded a new franchise to Rick DeStefane, with the goal of returning to the field for the 2018 season. As of 2018, Rick DeStefane is the sole owner of the O'Fallon Hoots.

For the 2020 season, the Prospect League ceased play due to the COVID-19 pandemic. However, the O'Fallon Hoots played host to a six-team league at CarShield Field, with each team playing 30 game seasons. The CarShield Collegiate League began play on July 1, 2020, with a schedule of 7 inning games.

== Stadium ==
The Hoots play at CarShield Field.

== Seasons ==
Season	Manager	Record	Win %	League	Division	GB	Post-season record	Post-season win %	Post-season result	Notes
2018	Clayton Hicks	25–35	.417	10th	5th	11.0	0–0	.000	Did not qualify	Inaugural season
2019	Clayton Hicks	23–37	.383	11th	6th	20.0	0–0	.000	Did not qualify	Final season in Hannibal
2020	Season cancelled (COVID-19 pandemic)									
2021	Matt Brown	33–27	.550	5th	2nd	5.0	0–1	.000	Lost Prairie Land Division Championship (Cape)	First season in O'Fallon
2022	Jonathan Mills	28–32	.467	9th	2nd	4.0	0–0	.000	Did not qualify	
2023	Jeff Wetzler	28–30	.483	9th	3rd	11.5	0–0	.000	Did not qualify	
2024	Matt Brown	29–27	.518	9th	4th	4.5	0–0	.000	Did not qualify	
2025	Matt Brown	41–15	.732	5th	2nd	–	0–1	.000	Lost South Division Championship (Cape)	
2026	Carter Mize	34–21	.618	3rd	2nd	11.0	0–1	.000	Lost South Division Championship (Cape)	
Totals		241–224	.518				0–3	.000		

== Roster ==
O'Fallon Hoots roster
Active roster	Coaching staff
Pitchers: 29 Evan Abercrombie; 35 Mason Burke; 22 Jake Collier; 34 Keller Costello; 31 Noah Cunningham; 2 Nate Estopare; 7 Noah Jones; 32 Alex Jung; 43 Adam Kilburn; 39 Gavin Kinworthy; 5 Mason Lee; 18 Ethan Milius; 44 Jack Moore; 26 Cameron Mosier; 40 Owen Nesslage; -- Carter Perry; 37 Drew Politte; 28 Gabriel Sieve; -- Sam Smith; 33 Aiden Strickland; 14 Zach Taylor; -- Noah Turner; 38 Jack Werkowitch; 6 Bronco Whitt; Catchers: 17 Carson Ramos; 21 Brayden Schafer; 10 Carson Shear; 16 Brady Vessells; Infielders: 36 John Connors; 19 Kaden Kinsler; 15 Samuel Paule; 12 Matthew Rauser; 23 Kyle Rehg; 11 Baker Shelhamer; 9 Nick Steurer; Outfielders: 3 Nick Bonczkowski; 30 Mason Breidenbach; 42 Griffin Brown; 20 Ethan Cantareira; 8 Jake McGhee; -- Brady Nolen	Manager: -- Carter Mize; Coaches: TBD; Disabled list; ‡ Inactive list; § Suspended list; updated June 16, 2026
