= Hannibal, Missouri minor league baseball history =

Hannibal, Missouri minor league baseball teams
- 1908–1955; (1908–1912, 1916–1917, 1947–1948, 1952–1955); Hannibal, Missouri

Minor league affiliations
- Class: Class D (1908–1912); Class B (1916–1917); Class C (1947–1948); Class D (1952–1955)
- League: Illinois–Missouri League (1908); Central Association (1909–1912); Illinois–Indiana–Iowa League (1916–1917); Central Association (1947–1948); Mississippi–Ohio Valley League (1952–1955)

Major league affiliations
- Team: St. Louis Browns (1947–1948); St. Louis Cardinals (1953–1954)

Minor league titles
- League titles (1): 1908
- Wild card berths (4): 1947; 1948; 1952; 1953

Team data
- Name: Hannibal Cannibals (1908–1912); Hannibal Mules (1916–1917); Hannibal Pilots (1947–1948); Hannibal Stags (1952); Hannibal Cardinals (1953–1954); Hannibal Citizens (1955)
- Ballpark: League Park (1908–1909); Mainland's Park (1910–1917); Clemens Field (1947–1955)

Minor league baseball teams were based in Hannibal, Missouri in various seasons between 1908 and 1955. Hannibal teams played as members of the Illinois–Missouri League in 1908, Central Association from 1909 to 1912, Illinois–Indiana–Iowa League from 1916 to 1917, Central Association from 1948 to 1949 and the Mississippi–Ohio Valley League from 1952 to 1955. The Mississippi-Ohio Valley League evolved to become the Midwest League.

Hannibal was a minor league affiliate of the St. Louis Browns in 1947 and 1948 and St. Louis Cardinals from 1953 to 1954.

Baseball Hall of Fame member and Hannibal native Jake Beckley was player/manager of the 1911 Hannibal Cannibals.

Hannibal, Missouri is the hometown of author Mark Twain, also known as Samuel Clemens, the namesake of the Hannibal baseball park: Clemens Field.

== History ==
Hannibal teams played under a variety of monikers throughout their history. The first Hannibal minor league team was known as the Hannibal Cannibals, beginning play in the 1908 Illinois–Missouri League and continuing in the Central Association from 1909 to 1912. Baseball Hall of Fame member Jake Beckley played and managed for the 1911 Hannibal Cannibals.

On August 25, 1911, Roy Brown of the Hannibal Cannibals pitched a no-hitter against the Monmouth Browns as Hannibal won the game 3–0.

The Hannibal Mules played as members of the Illinois–Indiana–Iowa League in 1916 and 1917.

After decades without hosting a minor league team, the Hannibal Pilots formed as members of the Central Association, playing in the league in 1947 and 1948.

Hannibal was an expansion team in the 1952 Mississippi–Ohio Valley League, the predecessor of the Midwest League. The 1952 Hannibal Stags, Hannibal Cardinals from 1953 to 1954 and Hannibal Citizens in 1955, were members of the Mississippi–Ohio Valley League.

Hannibal pitcher Richard Lessman threw a no–hitter against the Lafayette Red Sox on August 9, 1955, in a 1–0 victory. After the 1955 season, the Hannibal franchise relocated to become the Michigan City White Caps for the first Midwest League season.

Hannibal has not hosted another professional minor league team.

Between 2014 and 2019, the Hannibal Cavemen and Hannibal Hoots of the collegiate summer Prospect League played at a renovated Clemens Field, which is also used for youth baseball.

== The ballparks ==
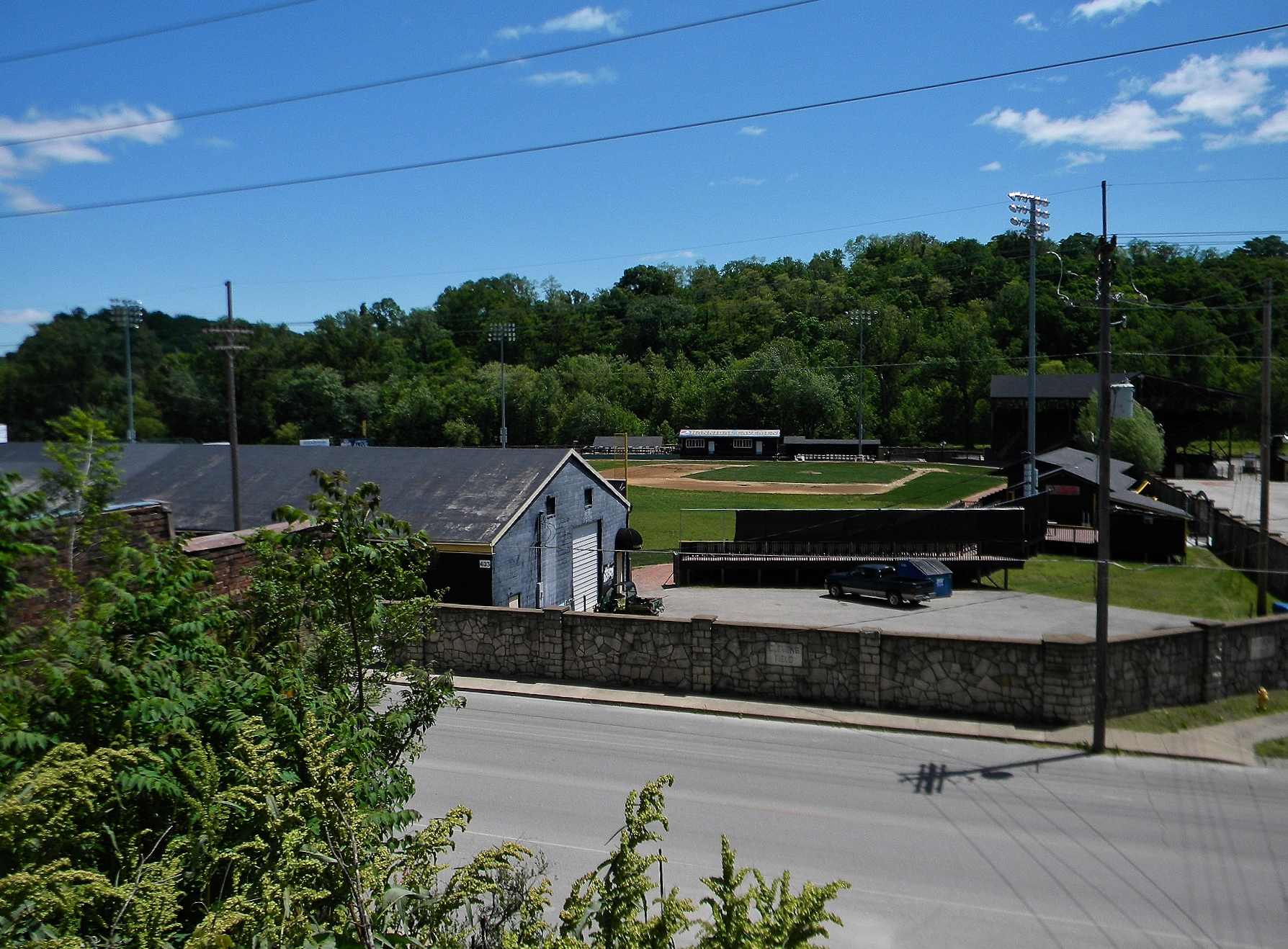
(2016) Clemens Field, Hannibal, Missouri.

Clemens Field, named for native Samuel Clemens, was built in 1938 as a Works Project Administration (WPA) Project and was home to the Hannibal teams thereafter. Clemens Field underwent a major renovation in 2009. today, the stadium has the original grandstand and brick wall perimeter, with a capacity of 2,500. Clemens Field is located at 403 Warren Barrett Drive, Hannibal, Missouri.

Previous to Clemens Field, the earlier Hannibal teams played at Mainland's Park (1910–1917), located on Market Street in the Oakwood neighborhood and League Park (1908–1909), located at the corner of Lyon and Glasscock Street, Hannibal, Missouri.

== Timeline ==
Year(s)	# Yrs.	Team	Level	League	Affiliate	Ballpark
1908	1	Hannibal Cannibals	Class D	Illinois–Missouri League	None	League Park
1909	1	Hannibal Cannibals	Class D	Illinois–Missouri League	None	League Park
1910–1912	3	Hannibal Cannibals	Class D	Central Association	None	Mainland's Park
1916–1917	2	Hannibal Mules	Class B	Illinois–Indiana–Iowa League	None	Mainland's Park
1947–1948	2	Hannibal Pilots	Class C	Central Association	St. Louis Browns	Clemens Field
1952	1	Hannibal Stags	Class D	Mississippi–Ohio Valley League	None	Clemens Field
1953–1954	2	Hannibal Cardinals	Class D	Mississippi–Ohio Valley League	St. Louis Cardinals	Clemens Field
1955	1	Hannibal Citizens	Class D	Mississippi–Ohio Valley League	None	Clemens Field

== Year-by-year records ==
Year	Record	Finish	Manager	Playoffs/notes
1908	68–49	1st	Bert Hough	League champions
1909	83–52	2nd	Bert Hough / Ben Prout	No playoffs held
1910	77–60	3rd	Bill Prout / Bill Forney	No playoffs held
1911	45–81	8th	Jake Beckley	No playoffs held
1912	67–61	5th	Eddie Herr /Ed Painter	No playoffs held
1916	79–57	2nd	Ted Waring	No playoffs held
1917	39–27	3rd	John Castle	League season shortened to July 8
1947	69–56	2nd	Ted Waring	Lost in league Finals
1948	67–62	3rd	Walter DeFreitas	Lost in 1st round
1952	70–57	4th	Walter DeFreitas	Lost in league Finals
1953	55–62	4th	Tince Leonard	Lost in 1st round
1954	58–68	7th	J.C. Dunn	Did not qualify
1955	42–84	8th	James Granneman / Allan Shinn	Did not qualify

== Notable alumni ==
- Jake Beckley (1911, MGR) Inducted Baseball Hall of Fame, 1971
- Al Bashang (1911)
- John Castle (1917)
- Oscar Fuhr (1917)
- Gary Geiger (1954)
- Dan Kerwin (1910)
- Joe Lutz (1947)
- Julio Navarro (1955)
- Ollie O'Mara (1911–1912)
- Hank Schmulbach (1947–1948)
- Roy Sievers (1947) 5x MLB All-Star 1957 AL Home Run Leader; 1957 AL RBI Leader; 1949 AL Rookie of the Year
- Cy Slapnicka (1909) Cleveland Guardians Hall of Fame
- Red Smyth (1912)
- Clyde Southwick (1912)
- Hack Spencer (1910)
- George Stutz (1917)
- John Wyatt (1954) MLB All-Star
- Charlie Young (1917)

== See also ==
- Hannibal Cannibals players
- Hannibal Cardinals players
- Hannibal Mules players
- Hannibal Pilots players
