= Windy City ThunderBolts =

Frontier League baseball team in Illinois, United States

- Founded in 1995 in Romeoville, Illinois; Based in Crestwood, Illinois since 1999
Team logo
Cap insignia

Minor league affiliations
- Class: Independent
- League: National Association of Professional Baseball (1999–present)
- Previous leagues: Heartland League (1996–1998); North Central League (1995)

Minor league titles
- League titles: 1998; 2007; 2008
- Division titles: 2007; 2008; 2010
- Wild card berths: 2009

Team data
- Previous names: Cook County Cheetahs (1997–2003); Will County Cheetahs (1996–1997); Will County Claws (1995)
- Colors: Black, Electric Blue, Workman Brown
- Ballpark: Ozinga Field (1999–present)
- Previous parks: Brennan Field (1995–1997); Howie Minas Field (1998)
- Owner/ Operator: Franchise Sports LLC
- General manager: Mike VerSchave
- Manager: Tom Carcione
- Media: Daily Southtown; WXAV; HomeTeam Network
- Website: wcthunderbolts.com

The Windy City ThunderBolts are a professional baseball team based in Crestwood, Illinois. The ThunderBolts compete in the National Association of Professional Baseball (NAPB) as a member of the West Division in the Midwest Conference. The team is owned by Franchise Sports LLC, playing its home games at Ozinga Field.

The franchise was established as the Will County Claws on February 21, 1994, and began play in the 1995 season. Franchise Sports LLC then bought the team in May 1998, and relocated the team to Windy City prior to the 1999 season, making them the first baseball franchise to play at Ozinga Field. The team was renamed the ThunderBolts in 2003.

== History ==
The franchise known as the Windy City ThunderBolts started as the Will County Claws in 1995 and played their home games at Lewis University's Brennan Field in Romeoville. The Claws played in the struggling North Central League, which started in 1994 with six teams but fielded only four in 1995. The North Central League folded 18 games into its second season with the Claws finishing at 8–10. In 1996, the Will County Cheetahs joined the new four-team Heartland League.

In winter 1997, the Cheetahs and the village of Crestwood, made a deal for Crestwood to build and own a new ballpark for the Cheetahs. The Cheetahs needed a home field and with Romeoville not an option, neighboring Midlothian would be the solution to the Cheetahs' home field problem as they would play their 1998 season at tiny Howie Minas Field. In Midlothian, the Cheetahs would have one of their best seasons finishing in second place with a 37–29 record in the first half and earn a playoff spot for the first time in franchise history. In the Heartland League championship, the Cheetahs swept the heavily favored Tennessee Tomahawks 2 games to 0 to gain the franchise's first title.

The Heartland League started the 1998 season with six teams and finished with only four teams. The Cheetahs, now known as the Cook County Cheetahs, won the last ever Heartland League championship as the league folded after three seasons.

In 1999, the Cheetahs joined the stable Frontier League and have been members since. The team changed their name to the Windy City ThunderBolts. An ownership change instigated the name change. The ThunderBolts mascot "Boomer" was born May 21, 2004.

On August 26, 2007, the ThunderBolts won their first Central Division title. On September 17, 2007, they defeated the Washington Wild Things to win the Frontier League championship, three games to two. In 2008, they repeated a division title as the West Division champions and Frontier League champions, defeating the Kalamazoo Kings three games to none in the championship series. After heavy rains flooded Homer Stryker Field, the entire 2008 championship series was played at the Thunderbolts' Standard Bank Stadium. They thus became only the second Frontier League team to win back-to-back titles, joining the 2001–02 Richmond Roosters.

The ThunderBolts currently play at Ozinga Field (which was renamed from Standard Bank Stadium in 2018) which is located in Crestwood, Illinois. Ozinga Field is easily accessible from the south suburbs, located two blocks east of Cicero Avenue on the Midlothian Turnpike (1.5 miles south of I-294).

On April 23, 2019, assistant general manager Mike VerSchave was named general manager. Having served as assistant general manager since 2014, VerSchave replaced former general manager Mike Lucas.

The club celebrated its 20th anniversary on the weekend of June 1–2, 2019. The team wore Cheetahs uniforms as a part of the celebrations.

On October 27, 2023, Former White Sox Closer and 2005 World Series Champion, Bobby Jenks, was named Field Manager. Jenks enthusiastically stated, "I believe I can do that and my track record has shown that I can do that".

On November 6, 2025, the ThunderBolts unveiled their new visual identity for the 2026 season. In addition, the ThunderBolts announced a 10-year lease extension with the Village of Crestwood and Ozinga Field, ensuring the ThunderBolts will continue to call Chicago's Southland home well into the 2030s.

== Players ==
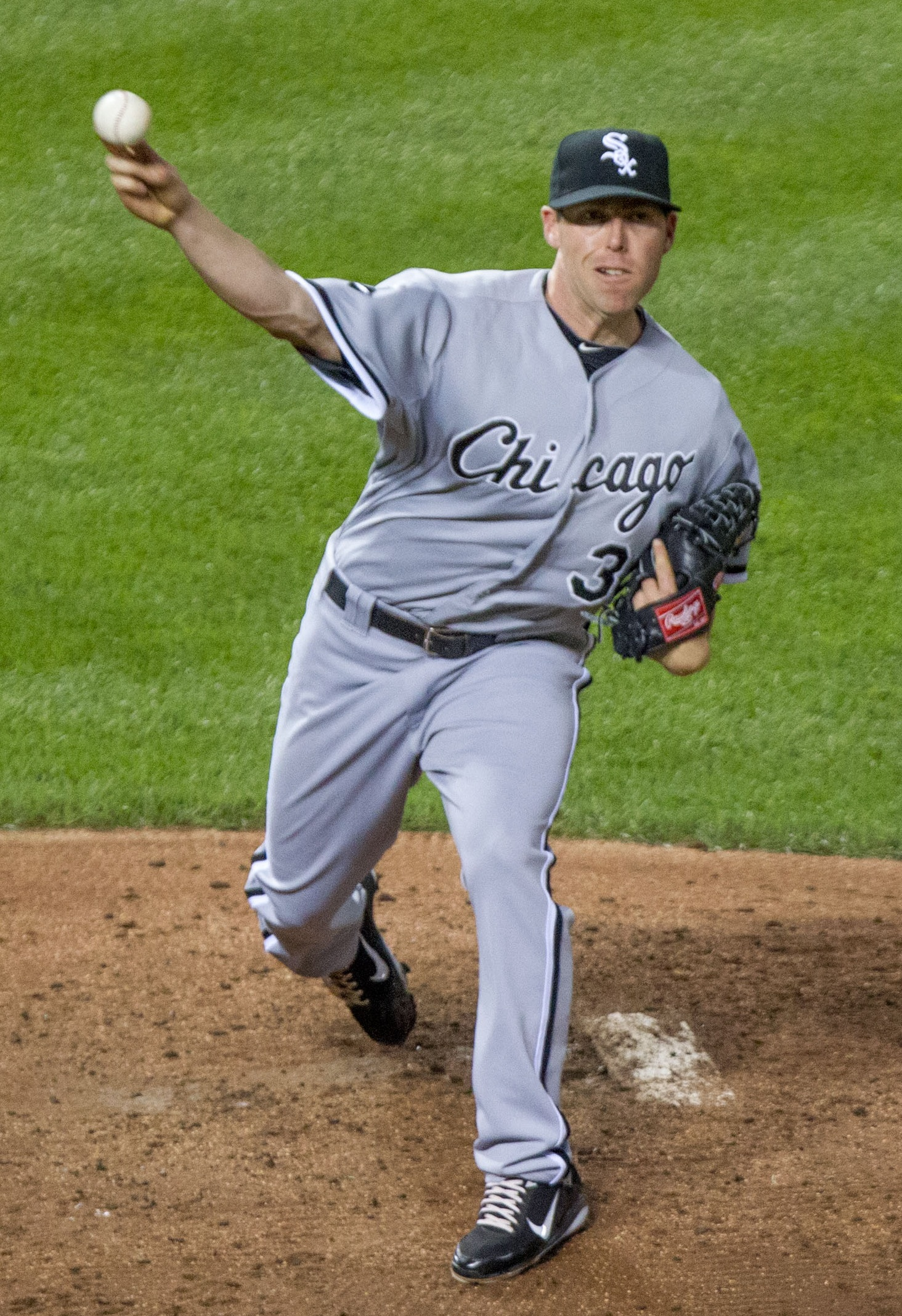
Dylan Axelrod

The San Diego Padres bought the rights to Cheetahs pitcher Chris Oxspring in 2000. He became the first player in franchise history to play in Major League Baseball (MLB). He played in five games for the Padres in 2005.

In 2011, Dylan Axelrod became the first former ThunderBolt and second player in franchise history to play in MLB, having been called up by the Chicago White Sox.

On August 5, 2008, Isaac Hess threw the first no-hitter in ThunderBolts history. Tyson Corley threw the second on August 28, 2012.

Pitcher Andrew Werner became the third player in club history to make it to the majors when he started for the San Diego Padres in 2012.

Former major leaguer Josh Spence played with the ThunderBolts in 2014.

Tommy Nance played with Windy City in 2015. He later went on to be the fourth ThunderBolt alumnus to reach the Major Leagues when he debuted with the Chicago Cubs in 2021.

All 30 Major League Baseball teams have signed players out of the Frontier League. As of January 2023, the Cubs, Marlins, A's, Twins, Rays, Pirates, Blue Jays, Rangers, Padres and White Sox currently have former ThunderBolts' players or coaches in their organizations. There are a total of 50 players who have reached the Major Leagues after playing in the Frontier League.

== Season-by-season record ==
Year	W–L	W%	Place	Postseason
Will County Claws (North Central League)
1995	8–10	.444	3rd	Did not qualify
Will County Cheetahs (Heartland League)
1996	28–31	.475	3rd	Did not qualify
1997	31–39	.442	3rd	Did not qualify
Cook County Cheetahs (Heartland League)
1998	37–29	.560	2nd	Heartland League Championship Series: Defeated the Tennessee Tomahawks 2–0.
Cook County Cheetahs (Frontier League)
1999	41–43	.488	3rd in FL West	Did not qualify
2000	38–46	.452	3rd in FL West	Did not qualify
2001	28–53	.346	6th in FL West	Did not qualify
2002	40–44	.476	3rd in FL West	Did not qualify
2003	42–48	.467	5th in FL West	Did not qualify
Windy City Thunderbolts (Frontier League)
2004	37–57	.394	5th in FL West	Did not qualify
2005	39–57	.406	5th in FL West	Did not qualify
2006	41–54	.427	4th in FL West	Did not qualify
2007	68–28	.708	1st in FL Central	Frontier League Division Series: Defeated the Rockford Riverhawks 3–0. Frontier League Championship Series: Defeated the Washington Wild Things 3–2.
2008	60–36	.625	1st in FL West	Frontier League Division Series: Defeated the Southern Illinois Miners 3–1. Frontier League Championship Series: Defeated the Kalamazoo Kings 3–0.
2009	56–40	.583	2nd in FL West	Frontier League Division Series: Lost vs. River City Rascals 3–0.
2010	56–38	.596	1st in FL East	Frontier League Division Series: Lost vs. Traverse City Beach Bums 3–1.
2011	48–48	.500	4th in FL East	Did not qualify
2012	54–42	.563	2nd in FL West	Did not qualify
2013	50–46	.521	3rd in FL West	Did not qualify
2014	35–60	.368	7th in FL West	Did not qualify
2015	41–55	.427	6th in FL West	Did not qualify
2016	42–53	.442	5th in FL East	Did not qualify
2017	51–45	.531	3rd in FL East	Did not qualify
2018	41–54	.432	6th in FL East	Did not qualify
2019	42–54	.438	3rd in FL East	Did not qualify
2020	--	--	--	Season not played due to COVID-19
2021	43–53	.448	3rd in FL Central	Did not qualify
2022	33–62	.347	8th in FL West	Did not qualify
2023	43–52	.453	6th in FL West	Did not qualify
2024	40–56	.417	7th in FL West	Did not qualify
2025	36–60	.375	5th in FL West	Did not qualify
2026	55–47	.539	2nd in FL West	Did not qualify
Total	1176–1281	.473	—	
Playoffs	15–8	.652	—	3 Division titles, 5 Playoff appearances, 3 Championships

== Current roster ==
Windy City ThunderBolts roster
Active roster	Coaching staff
Pitchers: 22 Dan Brown; -- Maceo Campbell; -- Greg Duncan; -- Aaron Evers; -- Jordan Goldmann; 8 Bryce Hellgeth; -- Heath Mann; 24 Jacob Newman; 42 Kevin Pindel; -- Trevin Reynolds; -- Caleb Riedel; -- Jeff Rotz; -- Dylan Savino; -- Noah Stants; -- Bobby Vath; Catchers: -- Zach Beadle; 6 JJ Figueroa; 31 Kyle Harbison; -- Tyler Hill; Infielders: 12 Garrett Broussard; -- Jose Curpa; -- Winder Diaz; -- Jalen Greer; 14 Christian Kuzemka; -- David Maberry; 18 Emmanuel Sanchez; -- Donivan Williams; Outfielders: -- Ashton Creal; -- Ronny Dominguez; -- Kendal Ewell; -- Dakota Kotowski; 4 Cam Phelts; -- Michael Sandle; -- Oscar Serratos	Manager: -- Toby Hall (interim); Coaches: -- Kevin Santiago (hitting); Disabled list; ‡ Inactive list; § Suspended list; updated May 4, 2025 Transactions

== Notable alumni ==
- Chris Oxspring (2000)
- Ben Diggins (2006)
- Josh Lowey (2008)
- Billy Petrick (2009)
- Dylan Axelrod (2009)
- Ryan Bollinger (2010)
- Andrew Werner (2010)
- Markus Solbach (2013–2014)
- Josh Spence (2014)
- Tommy Nance (2015)
- Adam Oller (2019)
- Bren Spillane (2022–2023)
