= Joe Banner =

American football executive (born 1953)

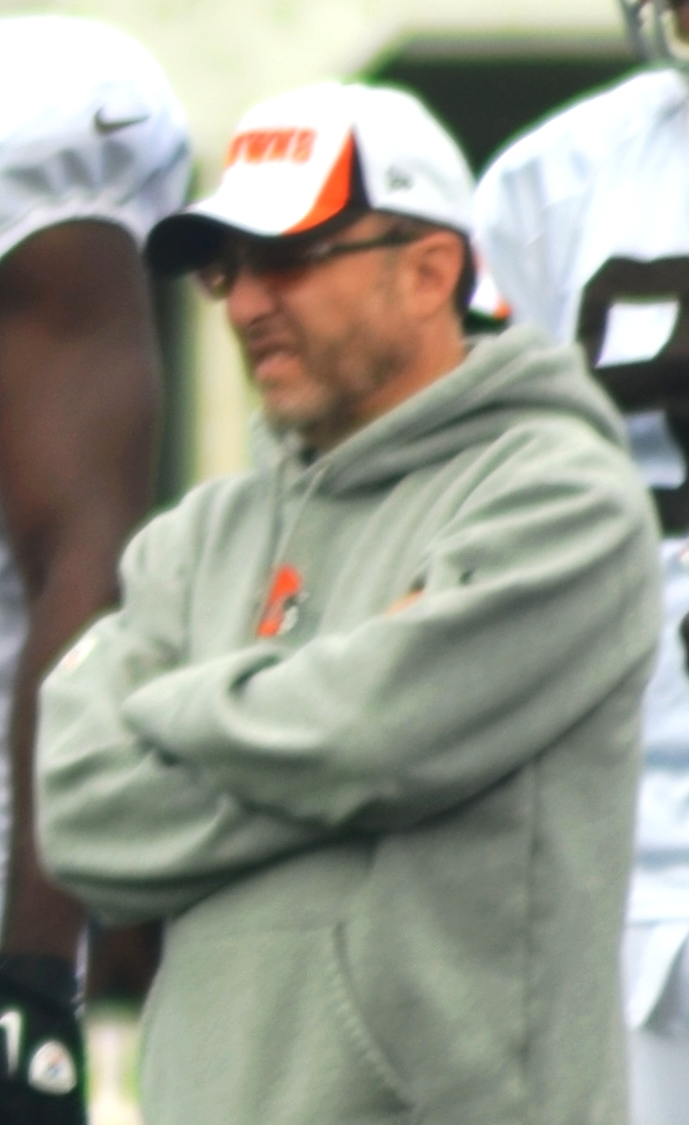
- Banner with the Cleveland Browns in 2013

Personal information
- Born: February 13, 1953 (age 73)

Career information
- High school: Rivers School (MA)
- College: Denison University

Career history
- Philadelphia Eagles (1995–2012) President; Cleveland Browns (2012–2013) Chief executive officer; Atlanta Falcons (2014–2015) Front office consultant

Joe Banner (born February 13, 1953) is an American football executive who was the former president of the Philadelphia Eagles (2001–2012), former chief executive officer of the Cleveland Browns (2012–2013), and former front office consultant for the Atlanta Falcons (2014–2015). Banner's tenure in Philadelphia stacks up with the most accomplished executives in NFL history. Under his leadership, the Eagles went to five NFC Championship Games in eight seasons and played in Super Bowl XXXIX. During the 2000s, Banner's Eagles had more playoff victories than any team other than the New England Patriots. In the regular season, the Eagles won more games than any team in the NFC, winning the NFC East eight times in ten seasons. He is also a co-founder of The 33rd Team, led the launch of Sharp Football Analysis, and has been an advisor to Patricof Co since its founding.

== Pre-football career ==
Born to a Jewish family, Banner attended the Rivers School in Weston, Massachusetts and studied economics at Denison University in Granville, Ohio. Banner spent his childhood summers at Camp Skylemar in Naples, Maine. In 1975, he spent a semester interning at WCAU 1210 AM radio in Philadelphia; soon after, he was hired there as a sports producer and reporter.

Banner left WCAU when he opened a chain of clothing stores in Boston called Designer's Clothing. He then became co-chairman of the Board for the Greater Philadelphia chapter of City Year, a national non-profit organization promoting community service for youth.

== Football executive ==
In 1994, Banner began his work in professional football when Jeffrey Lurie, an old friend, purchased the Eagles. He was promoted in 1996 to senior vice president, and in 1997 from senior vice president of administration to executive vice president. In 2006, his contract was extended through 2010. On April 1, 2010, his contract was extended three more years through 2013. He changed positions on June 7, 2012, becoming the strategic adviser to team owner Lurie. Don Smolenski replaced Banner as president.

In 2001, Banner received a "PARTNERS Leadership Award" from the University of Pennsylvania for his extensive community service, including volunteer activities reading to students in the Boston public schools and spending time with severely ill children in the Boston Children's Hospital. He has also been heavily involved, in both Boston and Philadelphia, with City Year, a program based on volunteers who commit to a year of full-time volunteer work.

Banner was the only non-league office member intimately involved in the 2011 CBA Negotiations on behalf of the owners. This resulted in a decade of labor peace and significant growth for the NFL.

In 2012, Banner was reportedly part of a group that was interested in purchasing the Cleveland Browns. On October 16, 2012, Banner was announced as the new CEO of the Cleveland Browns by new owner Jimmy Haslam. On February 11, 2014, the Cleveland Browns announced that Banner would be leaving the Browns by the following summer and leave a transition to the new management team which he had hired.

On December 24, 2014, Banner was hired as a consultant with the Atlanta Falcons.

In addition to his other accomplishments, Banner may be best known for his ability to identify and develop young talent, as evidenced by NBA team presidents Scott O'Neil and Len Komoroski and NFL team presidents Mark Donovan and Don Smolenski. Prior to hiring Andy Reid, he hired then future head coaches John Harbaugh, Jon Gruden, Sean McDermott, and Sean Payton. He also hired Andy Reid as head coach of the Eagles prior to Reid ever serving as a coordinator. With Reid, he collaborated on hires of Brad Childress, Matt Nagy, Doug Pederson, Steve Spagnuolo, Marty Mornhinweg, and Pat Shurmur. In the Front Office, he hired numerous eventual GMs in Brett Veach, Ryan Grigson, Tom Heckert, Jason Licht, and Howie Roseman.
