= Arsenal BG Ballpark =

Minor league baseball facility in Sauget, Illinois

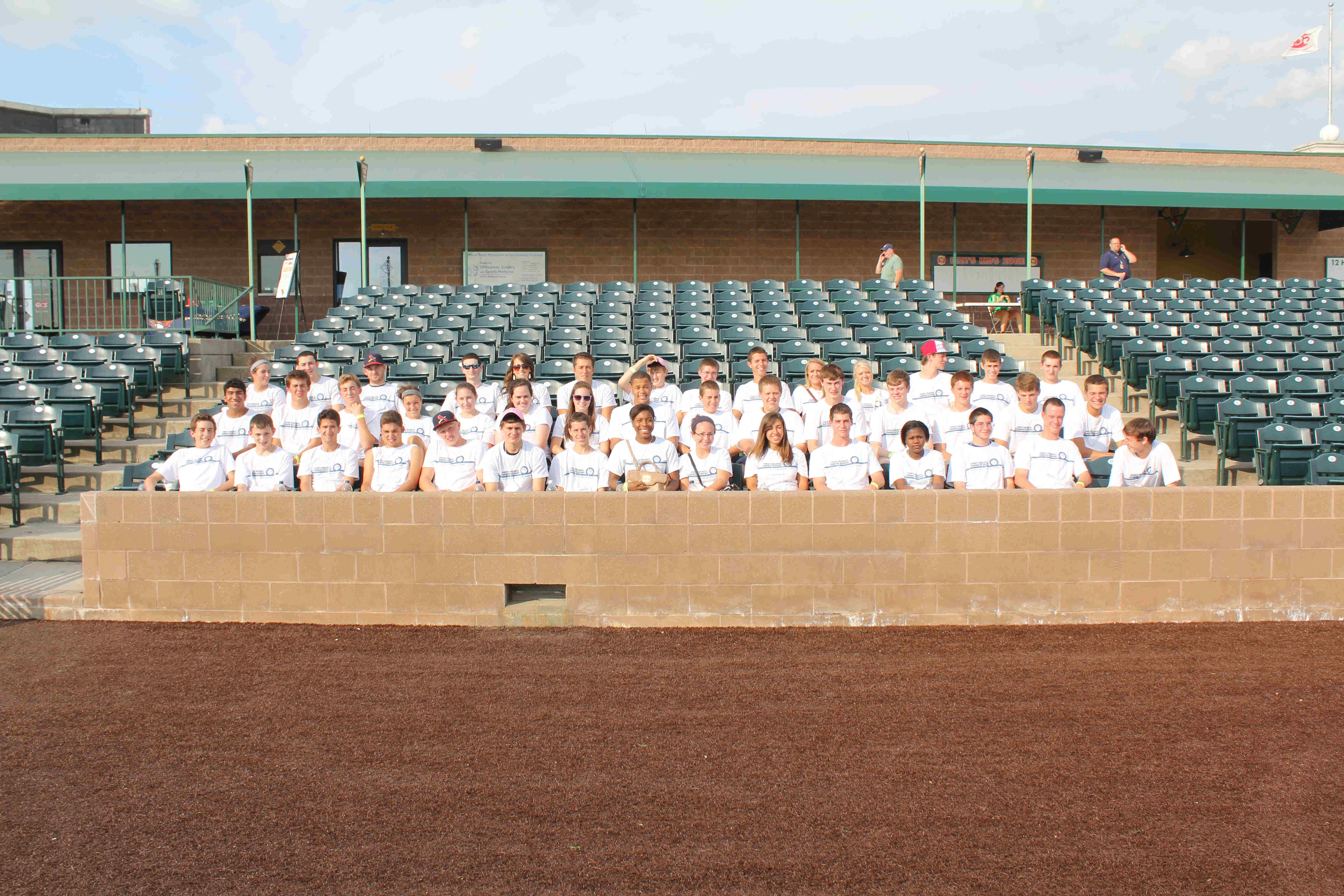
- A group of students in the grandstand.

- Location within Illinois Location within the United States
- Interactive map of Arsenal BG Ballpark
- Former names: GMC Stadium (2002–2006); GCS Credit Union Ballpark (2006–2023); Grizzlies Ballpark (2023–2025)
- Address: 2301 Grizzlie Bear Blvd. Sauget, IL 62206
- Coordinates: 38°33′58″N 90°8′9″W
- Owner: Village of Sauget
- Capacity: Baseball: 5,000 (2002–2004); 6,000 (2004–present); Concerts: 8,000
- Surface: Synthetic Turf
- Field size: Left field: 318 feet Center field: 385 feet Right field: 301 feet

Construction
- Opened: 2002
- Architect: Kuhlmann Design Group

Tenant
- Gateway Grizzlies (NAPB) 2002–present

Arsenal BG Ballpark is a baseball stadium in Sauget, Illinois that serves as the home ballpark for the Gateway Grizzlies of the National Association of Professional Baseball (NAPB). The stadium features reserved box seating, lawn seating, party suites, two hot tubs, and a section of bleacher seating in right field that was added in 2004. The stadium's seating capacity was increased to 6,000 following the renovations. In 2004, the Grizzlies became the first team in Frontier League history to draw over 200,000 fans for a season, finishing with a league best 217,500. ProGrass synthetic turf was installed in January 2012.

Arsenal BG Ballpark was built in time for the start of the 2002 season, under the original name of GMC Stadium. It was renamed GCS Credit Union Ballpark for the 2006 season. When that naming rights deal ran out before the 2023 season it became Grizzlies Ballpark. The ballpark was renamed Arsenal BG Ballpark before the 2025 season in a multi-year naming rights deal with Arsenal Business Growth.

Arsenal BG Ballpark hosted the 2008 NCAA Division II Baseball Championship. The stadium hosts the annual wood-bat college baseball game between the Billikens of Saint Louis University and the Salukis of Southern Illinois University. The ballpark also serves as the home field of Webster University's baseball team. It was home field for the now-defunct Lindenwood University – Belleville.

Arsenal BG Ballpark sells a unique food item called "Baseball's Best Burger", a variant of the Luther Burger. It consists of a bacon cheeseburger with a Krispy Kreme Original Glazed doughnut used as a bun. The ballpark and the burger were showcased in a special baseball-themed episode in season 2 of the Travel Channel's Man v. Food along with their nachos.

Events and tenants
Preceded by Homer Stryker Field	Host of the FL All-Star Game; GMC Stadium; 2003	Succeeded by T.R. Hughes Ballpark
