= CarShield Collegiate League =

US collegiate summer baseball league

- Classification: Collegiate summer baseball
- Sport: Baseball
- First season: 2020
- Director: David Schmoll
- No. of teams: 6
- Country: United States
- Venue: CarShield Field
- Most recent champion: Shredded Cheese (1)
- Most titles: O'Fallon Hoots, Shredded Cheese (1)
- Sponsor: CarShield Insurance
- Related competitions: Prospect League
- Website: https://ofallonhoots.com/ccl/

The CarShield Collegiate League is a collegiate summer baseball league based at CarShield Field in O'Fallon, Missouri. The league was formed in 2020 after COVID-19 forced the cancellation of the Prospect League season, which had the location host O'Fallon Hoots as a member. The CarShield Collegiate League began play as a six–team league on July 1, 2020, with all games being played at CarShield Field. The CarShield Collegiate League continued play in the 2021 season as a four–team league.

== History ==
For the 2020 season, the collegiate summer baseball O'Fallon Hoots were scheduled to play as a member of the Prospect League. However, the multi-state Prospect League ceased play in 2020 due to the COVID-19 pandemic. The O'Fallon Hoots, based in suburban St. Louis, Missouri, created a six-team league structure and served as host to the league at CarShield Field. With each team scheduled for 30 game seasons, the CarShield Collegiate League began play on July 1, with a schedule of 7–inning games. The season ended on August 14.

Limited tickets were made available to fans beginning June 8, 2020. In addition, CarShield Collegiate League games were broadcast live through Prospect League TV and CarShield Collegiate League TV.

"The CarShield Collegiate League will showcase local, high-caliber college baseball players to our great O’Fallon community," said O'Fallon Hoots General Manager David Schmoll."This spring and summer has seen players lose their seasons and fans lose sports. We are excited to still be able to provide community entertainment in a safe and responsible fashion."

The O'Fallon Hoots won the 2020 CarShield Collegiate League Championship with a record of 15–11–3.

On November 13, 2020, the Hoots announced that the league would return in 2021, with CarShield Collegiate League games played alongside the existing O'Fallon Hoots/Prospect League scheduled games. In their second season of play, the 2021 season will feature a four–team league, with each team scheduled to play 45 7–inning games. The team monikers were announced as the T-Ravs (Toasted Ravioli), Shredded Cheese, Rubber Chickens and Adidas Athletics. The three names, besides the already existing Adidas Athletics team, were selected by fan vote.

On June 5, 2021, a home run derby featuring former major league baseball players against selected Carshield Collegiate League players was held. Jim Edmonds, Rick Ankiel, Brandon Moss and Adam Kennedy participated in the event at Carshield Field.

In the second season of league play, the Adidas Athletics won the 2021 CarShield Collegiate League regular season championship, and the Shredded Cheese won the championship game. The Athletics had a record of 25–10 to finish 6.5 games ahead of the 2nd place Rubber Chickens team in the four–team league.

On June 4, 2022, the 2nd Annual MLB Alumni Home Run Derby featuring CarShield Collegiate League players was held. CarShield League players competed with former major league players Rick Ankiel, Rafael Furcal, Daniel Descalso, Ray Lankford and Brad Thompson in the event, held at CarShield Field.

The league was renamed to the 1st Phorm Collegiate League before the 2024 season.

== League Format ==
The seven-team league currently plays 29 7-inning games. The league winner is determined by a 4-team, 1-game playoff series at the conclusion of the regular season. Following the 2021 season, the league was host to the "Food Fight Series," a 5-game series between the two food-based teams in the league, the T-Ravs and the Shredded Cheese.

As of 2024, the teams currently in the league include the St. Louis Prospects, Adidas Athletics, St. Louis Gamers, Inevitable A's, Gators Baseball Academy, Premier Baseball Academy, and the Shredded Cheese.

== Stadium ==
All CarShield Collegiate League games are played at CarShield Field. Built in 1999, CarShield Field opened as TR Hughes Ballpark. Owned by the City of O'Fallon, the ballpark has a capacity of 5,150 people and dimensions of (left–center–right) 320 feet (98 m)–382 feet (116 m)–299 feet (91 m). The field is synthetic turf. The ballpark is located at 900 TR Hughes Boulevard, O'Fallon, Missouri.

== Season standings ==
=== 2023 Season standings ===
Team	W	L	T	PCT	GB
Shredded Cheese	18	9	1	.666	-
Athletics	17	9	1	.653	0.5
St. Louis Prospects	15	10	2	.555	2.5
St. Louis Gamers	15	13	2	.535	4.0
USA Prime	11	16	1	.407	7.5
Premier Baseball Academy	3	22	1	.120	13.5

=== 2022 Season standings ===
Team	W	L	T	PCT	GB
Shredded Cheese	19	9	1	.655	-
St. Louis Gamers	18	11	1	.600	1.5
Adidas Athletics	16	10	1	.593	2.0
Premier Baseball Academy	12	16	1	.414	6.5
Gashouse Baseball	10	18	1	.345	7.5
St. Louis Prospects	9	20	1	.300	8.5

=== 2021 Season standings ===
Team	W	L	T	PCT	GB
Adidas Athletics	25	10	0	.714	—
Rubber Chickens	18	16	0	.529	6.5
Shredded Cheese	14	20	0	.412	10.5
T-Ravs	12	23	0	.343	13.0

=== 2020 Season standings ===
Team	W	L	T	PCT	GB
O'Fallon Hoots	15	11	3	.568	—
Cornbelters	15	12	2	.551	0.5
Falcons	15	13	1	.534	1.0
Eagles	15	15	0	.500	2.0
Cavemen	12	14	4	.466	3.0
Gems	10	17	2	.379	5.5
