= Jake Beckley =

American baseball player (1867–1918)

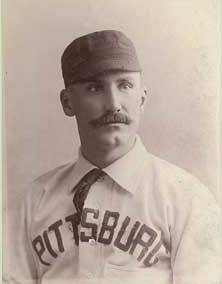
- Beckley in 1894
- First baseman
- Born: August 4, 1867; Hannibal, Missouri, U.S.
- Died: June 25, 1918 (aged 50); Kansas City, Missouri, U.S.
- Batted: Left Threw: Left

MLB debut
- June 20, 1888, for the Pittsburgh Alleghenys

Last MLB appearance
- June 15, 1907, for the St. Louis Cardinals

MLB statistics
- Batting average: .308
- Hits: 2,938
- Home runs: 87
- Runs batted in: 1,581
- Stats at Baseball Reference

Teams
- Pittsburgh Alleghenys (1888–1889); Pittsburgh Burghers (1890); Pittsburgh Alleghenys / Pirates (1891–1896); New York Giants (1896–1897); Cincinnati Reds (1897–1903); St. Louis Cardinals (1904–1907)

Career highlights and awards
- Pittsburgh Pirates Hall of Fame; Cincinnati Reds Hall of Fame

Member of the National

Baseball Hall of Fame
- Induction: 1971
- Election method: Veterans Committee

Jacob Peter Beckley (August 4, 1867 – June 25, 1918), nicknamed "Eagle Eye", was an American professional baseball first baseman. He played in Major League Baseball for the Pittsburgh Alleghenys, Pittsburgh Burghers, Pittsburgh Pirates, New York Giants, Cincinnati Reds and St. Louis Cardinals from 1888 to 1907.

Beckley had a batting average of over .300 in 13 seasons. His 244 triples are fourth all time and his 23,767 putouts is a major league record. A career .308 hitter he was elected into the National Baseball Hall of Fame in 1971 via the Veterans Committee.

== Early life ==
Beckley was born in Hannibal, Missouri. He was the son of Bernhart and Rosina (Neth) Beckley. Beckley began playing semi-professional baseball while still a teenager. A former Hannibal teammate, Bob Hart, suggested the 18-year-old Beckley to the Leavenworth Oilers (Leavenworth, Kansas) of the Western Association. After splitting two seasons between Leavenworth and a team in Lincoln, Nebraska, Beckley's contract was sold to the St. Louis Whites in the Western Association before he was purchased (along with Harry Staley) by the Pittsburgh Alleghenys for $4,500 midway through the 1888 season.

== Major league career ==
After playing one and a half seasons for the Alleghenys, Beckley and eight of his teammates jumped to the Pittsburgh Burghers, a team in the newly-formed Players' League (PL). Manager Ned Hanlon crossed over, as well. Beckley stated he was willing to go to the PL because "I'm only in this game for the money anyway." The league lasted only one season, and Beckley spent the next five and a half seasons with the Pittsburgh Pirates.

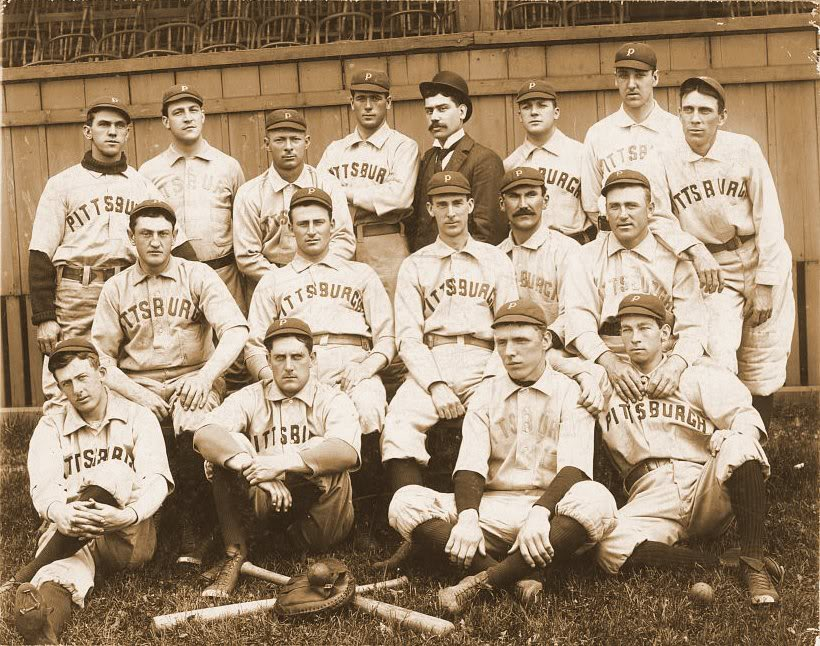
Jake Beckley in 1896 (middle, second from right) with the Pittsburgh Pirates

On July 25, 1896, Beckley was traded to the New York Giants for Harry Davis and $1,000. Beckley was released by the Giants the following season on May 22, and signed as a free agent with the Cincinnati Reds five days later. In his first season with the Reds, Beckley was unsuccessful in getting rookie Honus Wagner out with the hidden ball trick, a tactic he had been known to use against the opposition. But later when Wagner's Louisville Colonels came to play at Cincinnati, Beckley was successful in getting Wagner out, employing a strategy that involved the use of two baseballs. Against the St. Louis Browns (since 1900, the St. Louis Cardinals), Beckley belted three home runs in the same game on September 26, 1897, a feat not again matched until 1922 by Ken Williams. He played with Cincinnati for seven seasons and was later purchased by the Cardinals on February 11, 1904.

Beckley retired after the 1907 season with 2,930 career hits, second only to Cap Anson. He continues to rank fourth all-time among major leaguers in triples with 244. As of the 2014 season, Beckley holds the all-time best batting average among Pirates first basemen (.300). Beckley holds the MLB record for career putouts, with 23,743, and ranks second all-time in games played at first base, with 2,383.

== Later life ==
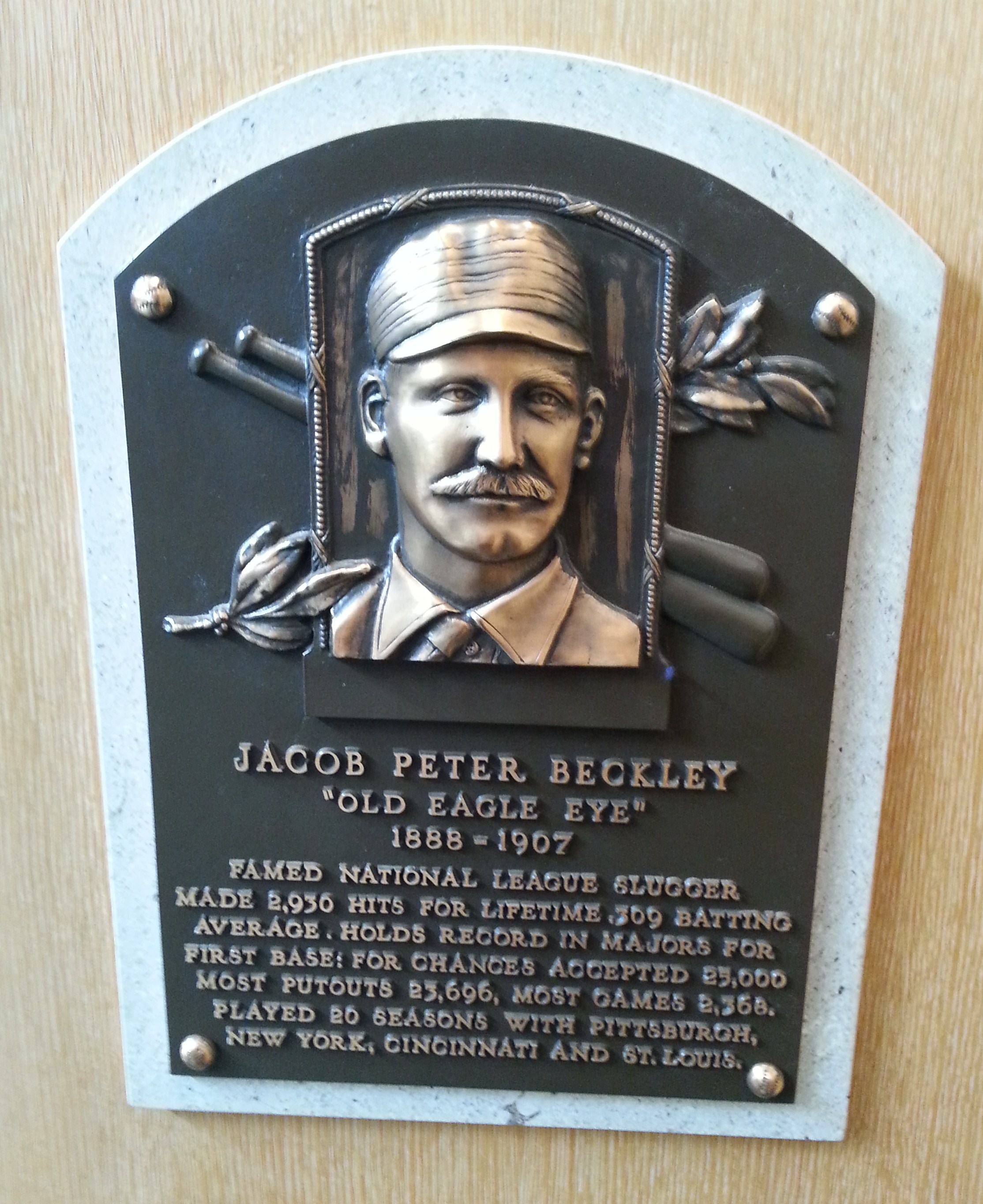
Beckley's plaque at the Baseball Hall of Fame

After his MLB career ended, Beckley became a player/manager for Kansas City in the American Association in 1908–1909, Bartlesville in the Western Association in 1910, and Hannibal in the Central Association in 1911. He served as an umpire in the Federal League in 1913 and also served as a baseball coach at William Jewell College in Liberty, Missouri. In addition to his umpiring and coaching after retirement from professional play, Beckley operated a grain business in Kansas City.

Beckley married Molly Murphy of Hannibal in 1891, but she died of tuberculosis seven months after their wedding. He later remarried after his playing career concluded. Beckley died of heart disease in Kansas City, Missouri at the age of 50. He was interred at the Riverside Cemetery in Hannibal.

== Honors ==
- Elected into the Baseball Hall of Fame in 1971.
- Member of Pittsburgh Pirates Hall of Fame
- Elected into the Cincinnati Reds Hall of Fame in 2014.
- In 2016, the Hannibal Cavemen of the Prospect League installed the Jake Beckley .308 Gate at Clemens Field in Hannibal, Missouri, Beckley's hometown and burial site.

== See also ==
- List of Major League Baseball career hits leaders
- List of Major League Baseball career doubles leaders
- List of Major League Baseball career triples leaders
- List of Major League Baseball career runs scored leaders
- List of Major League Baseball career runs batted in leaders
- List of Major League Baseball annual triples leaders
- List of Major League Baseball triples records
