= Lake Erie Crushers =

Frontier League baseball team in Ohio, United States

- Founded in 2009; Avon, Ohio
Team logo
Cap insignia

Minor league affiliations
- Class: Independent (2009–present)
- League: National Association of Professional Baseball (2009–present)
- Conference: Midwest Conference
- Division: Central Division

Minor league titles
- League titles: 2009
- Division titles (2): 2013; 2019
- Wild card berths (5): 2009; 2011; 2014; 2024; 2025

Team data
- Name: Lake Erie Crushers (2009–present)
- Colors: Purple and white
- Ballpark: ForeFront Field (2009–present)
- Owner(s)/ Operator(s): Blue Dog Baseball, LLC
- President: Vic Gregovits
- Manager: Jared Lemieux
- Media: Elyria Chronicle-Telegram; The Morning Journal; HomeTeam Network
- Website: lakeeriecrushers.com

The Lake Erie Crushers (often referred as the Grapes) are a professional baseball team based in Avon, Ohio. They compete in the National Association of Professional Baseball (NAPB) as a member of the Central Division in the Midwest Conference, and began play as an expansion team in 2009.

The Crushers won the 2009 Frontier Cup in their inaugural season. They defeated the River City Rascals, three games to two, after losing the first two games of the series.

== History ==
Avon Professional Baseball unveiled the name and logo on Thursday, December 4, 2008, of the Frontier League team that will begin play in Avon. The name was chosen from entries submitted in a "Name the Team" contest sponsored by The Morning Journal. The owner of the team, Steven Edelson, said more than 800 team name ideas were submitted.

After years of talk, Frontier League officials decided to put a team in Lorain County. After initially hinting it would be in Lorain, they decided to go with Avon because, rumor was they were not happy with the stadium Lorain was offering them, which is now known as The Pipe Yard.

The "Name the Team" contest was launched in October, and the hundreds of entries were whittled down. Fans then voted on finalist selections, choosing from Ohio, Lorain County, Avon, Cleveland or Lake Erie for the team location name and the Groove, Ironmen, Red Tails, Artichokes, Crushers, Walleyes, and Woollies for the team name.

In their inaugural season in 2009, the Lake Erie Crushers won the Frontier League championship after a 57-38 regular season. They rallied to eliminate the Kalamazoo Kings, three games to two, before rallying from a 2-0 series deficit to defeat the River City Rascals in the Frontier League Championship Series, 3-2, with a 13-10 Game 5 victory on the road on Sept. 23, 2009.

The Crushers also reached the Frontier League postseason in 2011, 2013, 2014, 2019, 2024, and 2025. They reached the Frontier League Championship Series once during that span, being swept by the Schaumburg Boomers, three games to none.

In February 2016, Edelson sold the team to Tom & Jacqueline Kramig of Blue Dog Baseball LLC. The Kramigs are on-site owner/operators who initiated several significant upgrades to the team and the ballpark in conjunction with the City of Avon. The Kramig's sold the team to group headed by former Cleveland Cavaliers CEO Len Komoroski in March 2024.

On March 15, 2017, the Lake Erie Crushers unveiled new logos and uniforms that allude to the viticulture of the Great Lakes region. Purple and white replaced the original colors of black and red.

== Seasons ==
Lake Erie Crushers (Frontier League)
Year	W–L	Win %	Place	Postseason	Manager
2009	57–38	.600	2nd in FL East	Frontier League Division Series: Defeated the Kalamazoo Kings 3–2. Frontier League Championship Series: Defeated the River City Rascals 3–2.	John Massarelli
2010	50–46	.521	4th in FL East	No Postseason, did not qualify	John Massarelli
2011	51–45	.537	2nd in FL East	Frontier League Division Series: Lost to Joliet Slammers 3–0.	John Massarelli
2012	53–42	.558	4th in FL East	No Postseason, did not qualify	John Massarelli
2013	56–40	.583	1st in FL East	Frontier League Division Series: Defeated the Traverse City Beach Bums 3–1. Frontier League Championship Series: Lost to the Schaumburg Boomers 3–0.	Jeff Isom
2014	52–43	.547	4th in FL East	Frontier League Wild Card: Lost to the Schaumburg Boomers 1–0.	Chris Mongiardo
2015	38–57	.400	6th in FL East	No Postseason, did not qualify	Chris Mongiardo
2016	48–48	.500	2nd in FL East	No Postseason, did not qualify	Chris Mongiardo/Cam Roth
2017	45–51	.469	4th in FL East	No Postseason, did not qualify	Cam Roth
2018	50–46	.521	3rd in FL East	No Postseason, did not qualify	Cam Roth
2019	54–42	.563	1st in FL East	Frontier League Division Series: Lost to Florence Freedom 3–0.	Cam Roth
2020	——	——	——	Season cancelled due to COVID-19 pandemic	——
2021	41–55	.427	3rd in FL East	No Postseason, did not qualify	Dan Rohn
2022	49–47	.510	5th in FL West	No Postseason, did not qualify	Cam Roth
2023	37-59	.385	8th in FL West	No Postseason, did not qualify	Jared Lemieux
2024	51-44	.537	3rd in FL West	Frontier League Wild Card: Defeated Gateway Grizzlies 10-8; Frontier League Divisional Series: Lost to Washington Wild Things 2-0	Jared Lemieux
2025	52-41	.559	2nd in FL West	Lost Frontier League Wild Card Round to Schaumburg Boomers 2-0	Jared Lemieux
2026	42-59	.416	4th in FL Central	No Postseason, did not qualify	Jared Lemieux
Totals	775–748	.507	—	7 appearances, 2 division titles, 1 runner-up finish, 1 championship; 9–15, .375	—

== Current roster ==
Lake Erie Crushers roster
Active (24-man) roster		Coaching staff
Pitchers: -- Michael Brewer; -- Cal Carver; -- Jack Eisenbarger; -- Anthony Escobar; -- Steven Ordorica; -- Kenny Pierson; -- Miguel Pozo; -- Darrien Ragins; -- Leonardo Rodriguez; -- Ethan Smith; -- Dylan Spain; -- Michael Spinozzi; -- Sammy Tavarez; -- Juan Zapata	Catchers: -- Alfredo González; Infielders: -- Vincent Byrd Jr.; -- Zack Campbell; -- Alberti Chavez; -- Scout Knotts; -- Davie Morgan; -- Logan Thomason; -- Jarrod Watkins; Outfielders: -- Jacob Corson; -- Burle Dixon; 7 Sam Franco; -- Jordan Harrison-Dudley; -- Matty Warren	Manager: -- Jared Lemieux; Coaches: -- Jerry Gonzalez (hitting); Disabled list; ‡ Inactive list; § Suspended list; updated May 4, 2025 Transactions

== Notable alumni ==
- Chris Smith (2010)
- Mickey Jannis (2012–2014)
- Robb Paller (2016–2017)
- Travis Hafner (2018)
- Coco Crisp (2019)
- Ryan Feierabend (2021)
- J. D. Hammer (2023)
- Alfredo González (2024–present)

== Stadium ==
The Crushers play at ForeFront Field in Avon, Ohio, which has been their home since their inception in 2009. The ballpark has a seating capacity of 5,000, 11 private suites, four-person terrace tables, berm seating and picnic and patio areas for group outings, bringing the total capacity to 7,000 fans. The playing surface is artificial turf, and includes concession stands, a gift shop and a state-of-the-art sound system.
