= Hannibal Hoots =

- Logo

Information
- League: Prospect League
- Location: Hannibal, Missouri
- Ballpark: Clemens Field
- Founded: 2018
- Ownership: Rick DeStefane
- General manager: Matt Stembridge
- Manager: Clayton Hicks
- Media: Hannibal Courier-Post
- Website: HannibalHoots.com

The Hannibal Hoots were a collegiate summer league baseball team in the United States Prospect League. The team played two seasons in the league, but only one of those seasons saw them use Hannibal as its home; flooding along the Mississippi River caused Bear Creek, which flows into the river and runs alongside the Hoots' home stadium, to flood the stadium. As a result, the Hoots played their 2019 home schedule in nearby Quincy, Illinois at the home stadium of the Quincy Gems. The Hoots formed in late 2017 and were an expansion franchise for the 2018 season. The Hoots and other collegiate summer leagues and teams exist to give top college players professional-like experience without affecting NCAA eligibility.

Hannibal's previous team in the Prospect League, the Hannibal Cavemen, suspended operations after the 2016 season, leaving the city without a team for the 2017 season. Rick DeStefane, a co-owner of the Cavemen, would become the sole owner of the Hoots. The two franchises are considered by the Prospect League to have been independent of one another.

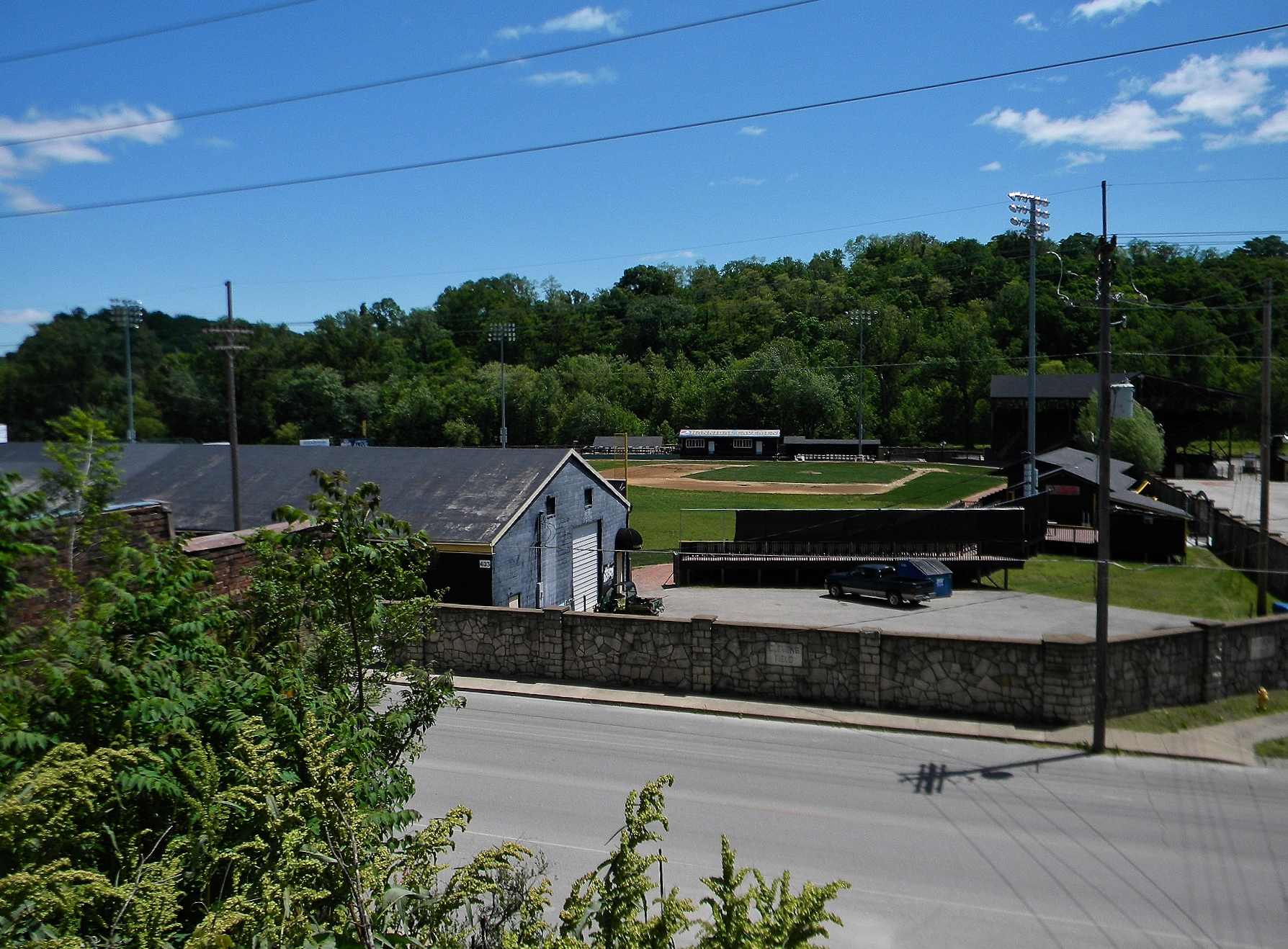
Clemens Field, Home of the Hannibal Hoots. Clemens Field is on the National Register of Historic Places

The Hoots were a member of the West Division of the Prospect League along with the Cape Catfish, DuPage Pistol Shrimp, Normal CornBelters, Quincy Gems and Springfield Sliders.

== History ==
After the Hannibal Cavemen folded in 2016, the Prospect League awarded a franchise to Rick DeStefane, with the goal of returning to the field for the 2018 season. The franchise partnered with the Hannibal Courier-Post to hold a "Dub the Club" contest, which resulted in five "finalist" name choices for the team - Hoots, Hucks, Huckle-Bears, Lumber Barons, and Steamers. The team and newspaper announced the winning name, the Hoots, on November 8, 2017.

On September 26, 2019, the Prospect League announced that the franchise would relocate to O'Fallon, Missouri, beginning with the 2020 season, with the O'Fallon Hoots playing their home games at CarShield Field.

== Stadium ==
The Hoots played at Clemens Field. The original Clemens field was built in 1924, but was destroyed by a fire. The current stadium was rebuilt and opened in 1939. However, due to extensive flooding along the Mississippi River during the spring and summer of 2019, Clemens Field and surrounding property sustained damage that forced the team to play its home games in nearby Quincy, Illinois, home of Prospect League rival Quincy Gems.

Clemens Field underwent a $3.3 million renovation project in 2008 and seats 2,500. The project received the Preserve Missouri Award.

Clemens Field was listed on the National Register of Historic Places in 2008.

== Seasons ==
Season	Manager	Record	Win %	League	Division	GB	Post-season record	Post-season win %	Post-season result	Notes
2018	Clayton Hicks	25–35	.417	10th	5th	11.0	0–0	.000	Did not qualify	Inaugural season
2019	Clayton Hicks	23–37	.383	11th	6th	20.0	0–0	.000	Did not qualify	Final season in Hannibal
Totals		48–72	.400				0–0	.000		
