= The Jerma985 Dollhouse =

2021 livestreamed event

- Created by: Jerma985
- Based on: The Sims
- Directed by: Alex Herreid
- Starring: Jerma985; Micathegr8; Ray Fuschetti; Brett Heininger; Jacob Komar; Ludwig Ahgren; Kitboga; Keenan Mosimann; Blair Hundertmark; Milton Pike; Vinny Superg; Zach Hudson
- Country of origin: United States
- Original language: English
- No. of episodes: 3

Production
- Executive producer: Jacob Komar
- Running time: 8.5 hr (507 min)
- Production company: JK Productions

Original release
- Network: Twitch
- Release: August 18 – August 21, 2021

The Jerma985 Dollhouse (or simply The Dollhouse) was a livestreamed event created by American streamer Jerma985 that ran between August 18 and 21, 2021. The event took place between three separate livestreams, broadcast on Jerma's Twitch page. The event was modeled after life simulation game franchise The Sims. In the event, the stream viewers were given control over what Jerma did, through the ability to make decisions using a stream extension. The event used status bars—a mechanic from The Sims—that displayed Jerma's needs, such as hygiene and energy. The status bars affected the outcomes of the decisions made by the viewers. Viewers could also choose the location for new furniture additions to the Dollhouse.

== Production and set ==
The stream was noted for its production value in comparison to most Twitch streams. The set included multiple rooms and a front yard, and the production comprised a crew of about 35 people. With each stream, new rooms were added to the set, as well as more characters. The event's planning took place over seven months. The exact cost of production is unknown, but it required a sponsorship from Coinbase and was more expensive than Jerma985's previous interactive stream, which cost $40,000 to produce.

== Streams ==
The event was first announced on August 3, 2021. The first stream, dubbed the "tutorial", took place on August 18, 2021, and lasted three hours. At the start of the stream, viewers were able to pick Jerma's outfit. The stream reached over 600,000 live viewers. The second stream took place on August 20, 2021, at 3pm EST. The third and final stream occurred on August 21, 2021, at 12pm EST.

== Reception ==
PC Gamer called Jerma's acting "charming and personable". GameRant described the stream as absurdist comedy, and noted the stream's high production value, calling it a "high-quality stream". Uproxx compared the stream to The Truman Show, and wrote "while The Sims streams have always been a pretty solid staple on Twitch, this unique take on it certainly feels like a first for the site". The Glasgow Guardian described the event as "a psychedelic fever dream of improv comedy brought to astounding new heights by inclusion of its interactive aspect". Study Breaks wrote, "It's difficult to imagine another livestream surpassing the ambition and surprising success of The Jerma985 Dollhouse." They praised the interactivity of the audience and the cohesiveness of the plot that continued between streams.

== Awards and nominations ==
Awards and nominations for The Jerma985 Dollhouse
Ceremony	Year	Category	Result	Ref.
The Streamer Awards	2021	Best Streamed Event	Won	
