= Alfredo González (baseball) =

Venezuelan baseball player (born 1992)

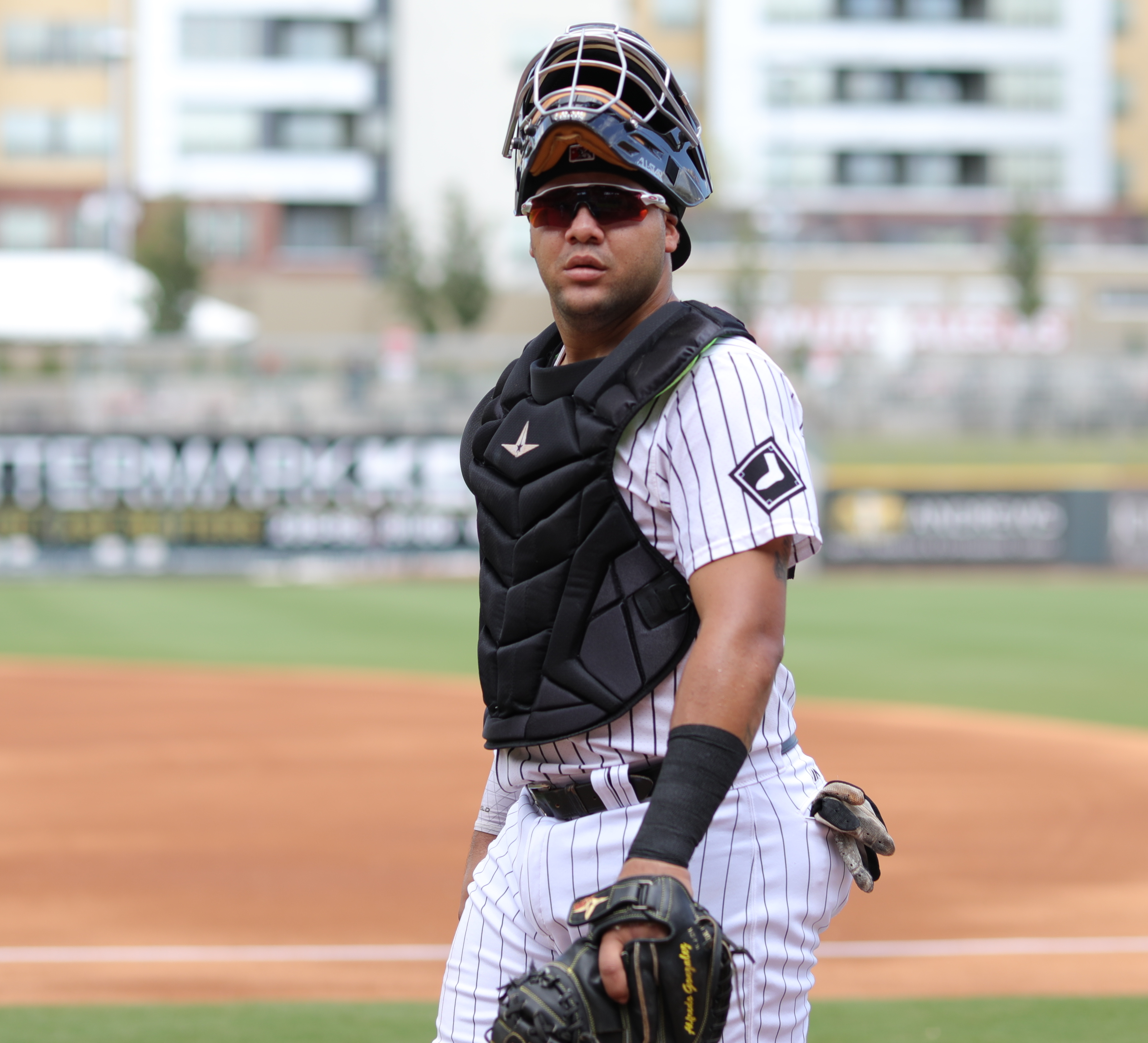

Staten Island FerryHawks – No. 32
- Catcher
- Born: July 13, 1992 (age 34); Santa Teresa del Tuy, Miranda, Venezuela
- Bats: Right Throws: Right

MLB debut
- May 26, 2018, for the Chicago White Sox

MLB statistics (through 2018 season)
- Batting average: .111
- Home runs: 0
- Runs batted in: 1
- Stats at Baseball Reference

Teams
- Chicago White Sox (2018)

Alfredo Rene González (born July 13, 1992) is a Venezuelan professional baseball catcher for the Staten Island FerryHawks of the Atlantic League of Professional Baseball. He has previously played in Major League Baseball (MLB) for the Chicago White Sox.

== Career ==
=== Houston Astros ===
González signed with the Houston Astros as an international free agent in July 2008. He played the 2009 season with the Dominican Summer League Astros. In 2011, González was assigned to the rookie-level Gulf Coast League Astros, where he would play that season and the 2012 season. In 2013, he played for the rookie-level Greeneville Astros, and played for the Low-A Tri-City ValleyCats in 2014. In 2015, González spent time with the Single-A Quad Cities River Bandits, High-A Lancaster JetHawks, and Double-A Corpus Christi Hooks.

On November 20, 2015, the Astros added González to their 40-man roster to protect him from the Rule 5 draft. He played in 44 games for Corpus Christi in 2016, batting .158/.236/.206 with no home runs and seven RBI. On June 25, 2016, González was designated for assignment by the Astros.

=== Chicago White Sox ===
On July 2, 2016, González was traded to the Chicago White Sox in exchange for cash. He was assigned to the Double-A Birmingham Barons and also spent time with the Triple-A Charlotte Knights before the season concluded.

González spent the entire 2017 season with Birmingham, playing in 71 games and hitting .208/.307/.301 with four home runs, 24 RBI, and four stolen bases. On September 17, 2017, he removed from the 40–man roster and sent outrighted to Birmingham.

González had his contract selected on May 24, 2018, and was called up to the majors for the first time. In three games, he went 1-for-9 with one RBI. On June 6, González was removed from the 40-man roster and sent outrighted to Charlotte. He would finish the 2018 season with Charlotte and Birmingham.

González was invited to spring training for the 2019 season but did not make the club and was assigned to Double-A Birmingham to start the 2019 season. In 67 games split between Birmingham and Charlotte, he slashed a combined .231/.328/.313 with two home runs and 23 RBI. González elected free agency on November 4, 2019.

=== Charleston Dirty Birds ===
On June 14, 2022, González signed with the Charleston Dirty Birds of the Atlantic League. He played in 79 games for Charleston, hitting .281/.353/.509 with 17 home runs, 49 RBI, and 17 stolen bases.

On March 14, 2023, González re-signed with the Dirty Birds for the 2023 season. However, he did not appear in a game in 2023 and became a free agent following the season.

=== Lake Erie Crushers ===
On December 8, 2023, González signed with the Lake Erie Crushers of the Frontier League. In 38 games for the Crushers in 2024, he slashed .288/.357/.511 with nine home runs, 32 RBI, and eight stolen bases.

González re-signed with the Crushers on January 3, 2025. In 78 appearances for the team, he batted .280/.369/.451 with 10 home runs, 41 RBI, and 12 stolen bases.

On December 17, 2025, González re-signed with the Crushers for a third consecutive season. He made 38 appearances for Lake Erie in 2026, batting .261/.342/.373 with two home runs, 16 RBI, and six stolen bases.

=== Staten Island FerryHawks ===
On July 21, 2026, González was traded to the Staten Island FerryHawks of the Atlantic League of Professional Baseball.
