= Jerma985 =

American internet personality (born 1985)

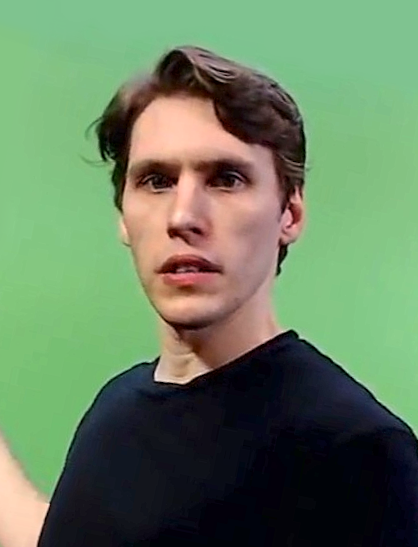
- Jerma985 in 2018
- Born: Jeremy; September 22, 1985 (age 41); Boston, Massachusetts, U.S.
- Occupations: Live streamer; YouTuber; Performance artist

Twitch information
- Channel: Jerma985
- Years active: 2016–present
- Genre: Gaming
- Followers: 1.6 million

X information
- Handle: @Jerma985
- Display name: Jerma
- Followers: 505,102

YouTube information
- Channel: Jerma985
- Years active: 2011–2017 (Jerma985); 2016–present (2ndJerma)
- Genre: Variety
- Subscribers: 1,000,000 (Jerma985); 902,000 (2ndJerma)
- Views: 242 million (Jerma985); 391 million (2ndJerma)
- Last updated: October 8, 2026

Jerma (/ˈdʒɜːrmə/ JUR-mə; born September 22, 1985), or Jerma985, is the stage name of an American live streamer, YouTuber, performance artist and voice actor known for his elaborate Twitch live streams incorporating surreal comedy. He has been described as an online personality across multiple social media platforms. He has also been jokingly described as "not real" by his fans and the wider internet community.

== Early life and education ==
Jerma was born on September 22, 1985, to an Irish-American father and Polish-American mother. Upon receiving a Bachelor of Science in communication studies, he freelanced as a wedding videographer, and spent some years as a middle school substitute teacher.

== Career ==
=== YouTube ===
Jerma created his YouTube channel, Jerma985, on June 11, 2011. His content primarily focused on the video game Team Fortress 2.

In March 2014, Jerma released the first "Jerma Rumble", an annual production which used the WWE 2K games to make primarily quirky or strange characters, often based on characters from past videos and live streams, and watch them wrestle in-game. In August 2016, Jerma released a live-action wrestling sketch as that year's Jerma Rumble. In 2015, he played multiple low quality Grand Theft Auto clones through the Apple app store, which is, as of October 2026, his most-viewed video.

=== Twitch ===
Jerma did not fully transition into Twitch streaming until 2016. He primarily streamed video games (such as The Sims) while interacting with viewers in the chat. His streams were heavily comedically driven, often involving physical sketches or interplay with the virtual audience. After transitioning to Twitch as a main platform, he became well known for his "unconventional streams" and green screen performances, which fans used to edit comedic videos, gaining notoriety for his distinctive and atypical live streaming formats and viewer interaction.

On September 21, 2019, Jerma hosted a real-life "robot carnival" stream that used viewer-controlled robots, allowing members of the live stream chat to control the aim in carnival games such as ring toss and dunk tank.

In March 2021, Jerma hosted a real-life archaeology and geology stream with a paleontologist from the Nevada Science Center. In the stream, he "unearthed" Grotto Beasts!, a fictitious trading card game from the 1990s based on Pokémon. The cards were produced in collaboration with multiple artists. Fans played along with the joke, producing fan art in the form of found footage-style art, such as a website for the card game made to resemble a GeoCities webpage from the 1990s.

In August 2021, Jerma began his real-life The Sims-inspired "Dollhouse" streams, which he described as his "biggest project yet". The first of three streams, entitled The Jerma985 Dollhouse, was aired on August 18, 2021, and began with a prerecorded video of Jerma choosing his outfit. The streams allowed viewers to control Jerma's actions through voting and suggestions, similar to the way one would control a Sims character: keeping him fed, happy, healthy and energetic, leading to a primarily improvised plot and series of events. The Dollhouse series is notable for its high production value, as well as the level of control that viewers were allowed to have over the events of the stream.

On August 19, 2022, Jerma hosted a streamed baseball game at CarShield Field, featuring the fictitious Jerma Baseball Association. He later compared the game to a "live comedy improv show". During the stream, two fictitious and comedic baseball teams, the Maryland Magicians and the California Circus (made up of semi-professional baseball players and circus performers), played a modified game of baseball with various gimmicks, such as "Power Cards" which provided advantages to the team that played them. Jerma played the role of the umpire. The event received financial support from sponsors Fansly and Manscaped.

On June 12, 2023, Jerma joined Offbrand, a media production company co-founded by fellow streamer and occasional collaborator Ludwig Ahgren, as chief creative officer. Later that year, Jerma discussed plans for a "soft retirement" from streaming, moving into further work with other creators in collaboration with Offbrand. Ludwig later revealed that Jerma stepped down as CCO of Offbrand in June 2024 due to "personal reasons".

== Awards and nominations ==
Ceremony	Year	Category	Nominated work	Result	Ref.
The Streamer Awards	2021	Best Streamed Event	The Jerma985 Dollhouse	Won	
The Streamer Awards	2021	League of Their Own	Himself	Won	
The Streamer Awards	2022	Streamer of the Year	Himself	Nominated	
The Streamer Awards	2022	Legacy Award	Himself	Won	
The Streamer Awards	2022	Best Streamed Event	Jerma Baseball Stream	Nominated	
