= Gateway Grizzlies =

Frontier League baseball team in Sauget, Illinois

Logo
Cap insignia

Information
- League: National Association of Professional Baseball
- Location: Sauget, Illinois
- Ballpark: Arsenal BG Ballpark
- Founded: 2001
- League championships: 1 (2003)
- Division championships: 4 (2003, 2007, 2012, 2023)
- Playoff berths: 8 2003 2004 2007 2008 2012 2023 2024 2025
- Colors: Navy, Grizzlie orange, white, black, green, gray
- Ownership: Richard "Rich" Sauget
- General manager: Kurt Ringkamp
- Manager: Kyle Gaedele
- Media: Belleville News-Democrat, HomeTeam Network
- Website: gatewaygrizzlies.com

The Gateway Grizzlies are a professional baseball team based in Sauget, Illinois. The Grizzlies compete in the National Association of Professional Baseball (NAPB) as a member of the West Division in the Midwest Conference. The franchise was founded in 2001 and they play their home games at the 6,000-seat Arsenal BG Ballpark, just 8 miles southeast of Downtown St. Louis. Some of the defining features of the stadium include lawn seats, bleacher seats, box seating, party suites, a hot tub suite, and more.

The Grizzlies won the Frontier Cup in 2003, defeating the Evansville Otters 3 games to 0.

The team have a rivalry with the Schaumburg Boomers, with whom they have shared a division since 2012.

== Season-by-season record ==
Gateway Grizzlies (Frontier League)
Year	W–L	Win %	Place	Postseason	Manager
2001	37–44	.457	5th in FL West	Did not qualify	Champ Summers
2002	34–50	.405	5th in FL West	Did not qualify	Rich Sauget
2003	50–38	.554	1st in FL West	Won 1st Rd. Playoff vs. Washington Wild Things 2–0. Won Frontier League Championship vs. Evansville Otters 3–0.	Danny Cox
2004	56–38	.588	2nd in FL West	Lost 1st Rd. Playoff vs. Rockford Riverhawks 3–2.	Danny Cox
2005	49–47	.442	3rd in FL West	Did not qualify	Danny Cox
2006	42–52	.512	3rd in FL West	Did not qualify	Danny Cox
2007	64–29	.688	1st in FL West	Lost 1st Rd. Playoff vs. Washington Wild Things 3–0.	Phil Warren
2008	51–45	.531	3rd in FL West	Lost 1st Rd. Playoff vs. Kalamazoo Kings 3–1.	Phil Warren
2009	40–54	.426	5th in FL West	Did not qualify	Phil Warren
2010	54–40	.574	3rd in FL West	Did not qualify	Phil Warren
2011	39–56	.411	4th in FL West	Did not qualify	Phil Warren
2012	57–39	.594	1st in FL West	Lost 1st Rd. Playoff vs. Florence Freedom 3–2.	Phil Warren
2013	53–43	.552	2nd in FL West	Did not qualify	Phil Warren
2014	50–46	.521	3rd in FL West	Did not qualify	Phil Warren
2015	45–50	.474	4th in FL West	Did not qualify	Phil Warren
2016	44–51	.463	6th in FL West	Did not qualify	Phil Warren
2017	32–64	.333	6th in FL West	Did not qualify	Phil Warren
2018	38–58	.396	6th in FL West	Did not qualify	Phil Warren
2019	39-57	.406	5th in FL West	Did not qualify	Phil Warren
2020	--	--	--	Season cancelled due to coronavirus pandemic.	--
2021	38-57	.400	4th in FL West	Did not qualify	Cameron Roth
2022	47-49	.490	6th in FL West	Did not qualify	Steve Brook
2023	59-37	.615	1st in FL West	Lost 1st Rd. Playoff vs. Evansville Otters 2-1	Steve Brook
2024	59-36	.621	2nd in FL West	Lost East Division Wild Card Game to Lake Erie Crushers 10-8	Steve Brook
2025	56-40	.583	2nd in FL West	Won East Division Wild Card Round vs. Washington Wild Things 2-0; Lost West Division Conference Finals vs. Schaumburg Boomers 3–0	Steve Brook
2026	44-57	.436	3rd in FL West	Did not qualify	Kyle Gaedale
Totals	1,010–961	.498	—	—	—
Playoffs	10–12	.454	—	3 Division titles, 8 Playoff appearances, 1 championship	—

== Current roster ==
Gateway Grizzlies roster
Active roster	Coaching staff
Pitchers: -- Donovan Burke; 21 Keegan Collett; 28 Teague Conrad; -- Sam Coonrod; 11 Tyler Cornett; 32 Alvery De Los Santos; -- Claudio Galva; 8 Matt Hickey; -- Francis Peguero; -- Sam Rochard; -- Zac Treece; 15 Gage Vailes; 14 Lukas Veinbergs; 23 Alec Whaley; Catchers: 9 Jose Alvarez; -- Tanner Garrison; -- Allante Hall; Infielders: -- Ross Friedrick; 2 Gabe Holt; 12 DJ Stewart; 18 Dale Thomas; -- Paxton Wallace; 10 Tate Wargo; Outfielders: 5 Cole Brannen; 20 Victor Castillo; -- Calyn Halvorson; 3 Edwin Mateo; -- Mark Shallenberger	Manager: 13 Steve Brook; Coaches: 38 Alex Ferguson (bench); 4 Kyle Gaedele (hitting); 17 Nick Kennedy (pitching); Disabled list; ‡ Inactive list; § Suspended list; updated May 4, 2025 Transactions

== "Baseball's Best Burger" ==
The team offers their own version of the Luther burger named "Baseball's Best Burger". Featured on ESPN, Fortune, and Man v. Food, the 1,000 calorie burger uses a deep-fried doughnut in place of a traditional bun.

== Broadcasting ==
Grizzlies games are currently broadcast on Mixlr, and can be watched live on FloSports with a subscription. The team's current director of Broadcasting and Media Relations is Jason Guerette.

== Notable alumni ==
- Scott Patterson (2002–2005), a retired pitcher, had his contract purchased by the New York Yankees in 2006. Patterson was called up to the majors for one game in 2008 before being sent back down, and was claimed three months later by the San Diego Padres. Following that year, he played for 8 more seasons between various minor league and international teams. As a member of the 2011 United States National Baseball Team at the Pan American Games, Patterson won a silver medal. He later retired in 2016.
- Justin Erasmus (2013), pitcher, played in the Boston Red Sox organization and in the Australian Baseball League before joining the Grizzlies for the 2013 season. He went back to the AUBL afterwards, and is currently on the Canberra Cavalry. Erasmus was a member of the 2009 South Africa roster and the 2017 Australia roster in the World Baseball Classic.
- Trevor Richards (2015–2016), pitcher, was signed by the Miami Marlins in 2016, and called up to the majors in 2018. He has since pitched for the Tampa Bay Rays and Milwaukee Brewers, and is currently on the Toronto Blue Jays.
- Josh Lucas (2023), former major league pitcher who played with the St. Louis Cardinals, Oakland Athletics, and Baltimore Orioles from 2017 to 2019. Signed with the Grizzlies for the 2023 season where he made 21 appearances for the Grizzlies, recording a 2.84 ERA with 43 strikeouts and 4 saves across 31 2/3 innings pitched.
