= Ozinga Field =

Baseball field in Crestwood, Illinois

- Interactive map of Ozinga Field
- Former names: Hawkinson Ford Field (1999-2006); Hawk Ford Field (2007); Standard Bank Stadium (2008-2018)
- Location: 14011 Kenton Avenue, Crestwood, IL 60445
- Coordinates: 41.637056°N 87.731688°W
- Owner: Village of Crestwood
- Operator: Windy City ThunderBolts
- Capacity: 3,500 (4,200 with standing room)
- Surface: Synthetic Turf
- Field size: Left field: 330 feet Center field: 390 feet Right field: 330 feet

Construction
- Groundbreaking: 1997
- Opened: 1999
- Architect: Devine deFlon Yaeger

Tenant
- Windy City ThunderBolts (NAPB) (1999–present)

Ozinga Field is a baseball stadium located in Crestwood, Illinois. The stadium was built in 1999 and holds 3,500 seats. It is the home field of the Windy City ThunderBolts, playing in the National Association of Professional Baseball (NAPB). It is also the home field for the Roosevelt Lakers baseball team of the Great Lakes Intercollegiate Athletic Conference.

== Name ==
The park features one of the few minor league baseball stadium upper decks in the country. The park was built for the Cook County Cheetahs. However, new ownership changed the name of the team into the current Windy City ThunderBolts.

== Renovations ==
The name change brought renovations to the ballpark between 2004 and 2006 including a new fan deck on the first base side, a beer garden, a new kids zone down the left field line, and a new ticket office also down the left field line. The ballpark was originally called Hawkinson Ford Field until the 2007 season when the park's name was modified to Hawk Ford Field. Another name change occurred during the 2007 season on August 13, when the naming rights were sold to Standard Bank. A new scoreboard/videoboard system was added toward the end of the 2014 season and in 2015 the old grass playing surface was removed and a new synthetic turf field with new drainage system was installed. The renovations make the facility a multi-sport & concert arena available 10 months a year.

On February 20, 2019, the ThunderBolts and the village of Crestwood issued a statement announcing the name change to Ozinga Field.

Events and tenants
Preceded by T.R. Hughes Ballpark	Host of the FL All-Star Game; Hawkinson Ford Field; 2001	Succeeded by Homer Stryker Field
