= Honor Credit Union Stadium =

Baseball park in Kalamazoo, Michigan

Coordinates: 42°17′25″N 85°33′45″W

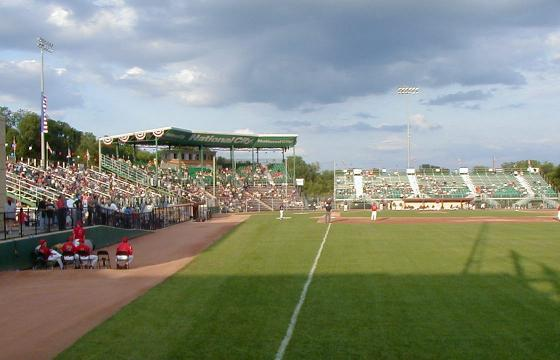
The stadium during a game in 2007

Honor Credit Union Stadium is a stadium in Kalamazoo, Michigan. The baseball field, referred to as "Homer Stryker Field" (the stadium's previous name from 2002 to 2025), is located in Kalamazoo's Mayors Riverfront Park. It is primarily used for baseball, and since 2014 has been the home field for the Kalamazoo Growlers of the collegiate summer baseball Northwoods League. It opened in 1963, and holds 4,000 people.

Homer Stryker Field previously was the home of the Kalamazoo Kings, an independent baseball league team in the Frontier League, from 2001 to -2010. Before that it had previously hosted another Frontier League team, the Kalamazoo Kodiaks, from 1996 to 1998. In the early 1950s, when it was known as "Catholic Athletic Association Field," it served as the home of the Kalamazoo Lassies, an All-American Girls Professional Baseball League team. Each team has made some renovations to a facility that has been in use in some form since 1925, although the oldest part of the current structure, a concrete grandstand now with aluminum benches, appears to date to 1963.

The 1995 renovation added new aluminum seating and a press box above the old grandstand, along with some additional bleacher sections flanking the central stand. Some new outbuildings have been constructed in the last few years. The field is somewhat unorthodox in that home plate is at the northeast corner of the grounds; traditionally and commonly, baseball fields have home plate at the westernmost end of the grounds so batters do not have to face the sun while hitting.

Homer Stryker was the founder of the Stryker Corporation. The Stryker family bought the naming rights in 2002 and placed Stryker's name on the field.

== Field dimensions ==
Left Field Foul Line: 290 feet

Center Field: 400 feet

Right Field Foul Line: 330 feet

Events and tenants
Preceded by Hawkinson Ford Field	Host of the FL All-Star Game; Homer Stryker Field; 2002	Succeeded by GMC Stadium
