= CarShield Field =

Stadium in O'Fallon, Missouri, U.S.

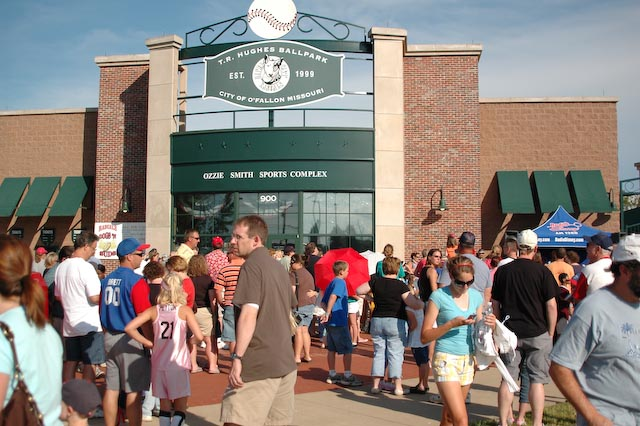
- Entrance, July 2008
- Interactive map of CarShield Field
- Former names: T.R. Hughes Ballpark (1999–2015)
- Address: 900 T.R. Hughes Blvd; O'Fallon, Missouri 63366
- Coordinates: 38.820518°N 90.680337°W
- Owner: City of O'Fallon
- Capacity: 3,500 (permanent seating) 1,650 (additional temporary seating) 5,150 (total)
- Surface: Synthetic Turf
- Field size: Left Field – 320 ft (98 m); Center Field – 382 ft (116 m); Right Center Field – 325 ft (99 m); Right Field – 299 ft (91 m)

Construction
- Groundbreaking: June 10, 1998
- Opened: June 1999
- Architect: Populous

Tenants
- River City Rascals (FL) 1999–2019; O'Fallon Hoots (PL) 2020–present CarShield Collegiate League 2020–present

CarShield Field, formerly T.R. Hughes Ballpark, is a stadium in O'Fallon, Missouri. It is primarily used for baseball, and was the home field of the River City Rascals Frontier League baseball team, until the team folded and ceased operations at the end of the 2019 season. Beginning in 2020, it became the home field for the O'Fallon Hoots of the Prospect League. CarShield Field became the host of the entire six–team 2020 CarShield Collegiate League upon the cancellation of the 2020 Prospect League season due to COVID-19. CarShield Field is home to a local high school baseball team, The Christian O'Fallon Eagles. It opened in 1999 with seating for 3,500 people, plus areas for 1,650 additional fans on lawn and outfield bleacher areas.

== History ==
Ground was broken for T. R. Hughes Ballpark on June 10, 1998. Construction cost the city of O'Fallon $3.9 million. In 2016, the stadium was renamed CarShield Field. In 2017, the natural grass playing field was replaced with a synthetic turf field. CarShield Field hosted the Missouri State High School Activities Association baseball championships from 2013 through 2019. CarShield Field also hosts soccer games and practices for the St. Louis Youth Soccer Association (SLYSA).

For the 2020 baseball season, the Prospect League ceased play due to the COVID-19 pandemic. However, the O'Fallon Hoots played host to a six-team league at CarShield Field, with each team playing 30 game seasons and 7 inning games. The CarShield Collegiate League began play on July 1, 2020, with limited tickets.

== Features ==
CarShield Field features a 40 foot tall wall in right field, due to the short dimensions, that features a manual scoreboard. The visiting bullpen is in play in left field, and the home bullpen is behind the wall in right-center field. The home and away clubhouse as well as a batting cage is located behind the center field wall. In left field, there is a playground and a basketball court.

CarShield Field offers a variety of seating options. The stadium offers stadium seating, bleachers, a grass berm down the left field line. In right field, the Screech Suites are an open-air stadium seating option, with quick access to the Picnic Perch, an all-inclusive area. Behind the berm in left field, the Birdseye Suites are a covered, open-air suite with furniture and folding chairs.

== Special events ==
The ballpark hosted a number of special events in addition to Rascals and Hoots home games. On October 13–14, 2007 the ballpark was the site of the longest baseball game in recorded history. A group of 40 players from the Men's Senior Baseball League of St. Louis played for 39 hours 29 minutes and 25 seconds. They played 92 innings and the score was 119–81 as the team representing the St. Louis Browns beat the team representing the St. Louis Stars. The record was reset in October 9–11, 2009 when the two teams played a 48-hour game, with the Browns defeating the Cardinals 180–140. Again, a new record was set when two teams played over 48½ hours, headed towards 60 hours from July 3–5, 2012.

On August 31, 2008, Senator John McCain held a presidential campaign rally in front of a overflow crowd of 23,000. McCain spoke briefly and introduced his running mate Alaska Governor Sarah Palin who also spoke to the crowd. Also speaking at the rally were top-tier Missouri Republicans including Senator Kit Bond and Governor Matt Blunt as well as former Governor Mitt Romney of Massachusetts and former Governor Mike Huckabee of Arkansas.

On August 13, 2009, the stadium was the site of a home run derby between first baseman Albert Pujols of the St. Louis Cardinals and basketball star Shaquille O'Neal for Shaq's reality television series, "Shaq Vs." in front of a capacity crowd.

The stadium hosted the 2015 Rams Coach Jeff Fisher Celebrity Softball Game in front of a crowd of over 3,000.

In collaboration with the O'Fallon Hoots, Carshield Field has hosted 2 MLB alumni home run derbies. On June 5, 2021, CarShield Field hosted a home run derby featuring former major league baseball players against selected Carshield Collegiate League players. Jim Edmonds, Rick Ankiel, Brandon Moss and Adam Kennedy participated in the event. On June 4, 2022, the 2nd Annual MLB Alumni Home Run Derby at CarShield Field was held. CarShield Collegiate League players competed with former major league players Rick Ankiel, Rafael Furcal, Daniel Descalso, Ray Lankford and Brad Thompson in the event.

On August 19, 2022, online streamer Jerma985 hosted a livestreamed baseball game at CarShield Field, featuring the fictitious Jerma Baseball Association. During the stream, two fictitious and comedic baseball teams, the Maryland Magicians and the California Circus, played a modified game of baseball with various gimmicks, such as "Power Cards" which provided unusual benefits to the team that played them. This event was viewed by over 250,000 viewers online.

Events and tenants
Preceded by League Stadium; GMC Stadium	Host of the FL All-Star Game; T.R. Hughes Ballpark; 2000; 2004	Succeeded by Hawkinson Ford Field; Falconi Field
