= Len Komoroski =

National Basketball Association executive

Personal information
- Born: February 21, 1960 (age 66) Pittsburgh, Pennsylvania, U.S.

Career information
- College: Duquesne University (BA, 1982)

Career highlights
- Director of Media/Community Relations for the Pittsburgh Spirit (1983–86); Assistant GM for the Minnesota Strikers (1984); COO for the Cleveland Lumberjacks (IHL) (1994–96); VP of Sales, Minnesota Timberwolves (1994-96); SVP of Business Operations, Philadelphia Eagles (NFL) (1996-2003); Pennsylvania Sports Hall of Fame inductee (2019)

Leonard Albert Komoroski (born February 21, 1960) is an American businessman and sports executive. He formerly was chief executive officer of Rock Entertainment Group, the umbrella entity that oversees the Cleveland Cavaliers in the NBA, the Cleveland Monsters in the AHL, the Cleveland Charge in the NBA G League, and the operation of Rocket Arena in Cleveland.

== Early life ==
Born and raised in Pittsburgh, Pennsylvania, Komoroski earned a Bachelor of Arts degree from Duquesne University in 1982. While attending college, Komoroski was a four-year letterman of the tennis team, writer for The Duquesne Duke, and the president of Public Relations Society of America.

== Career ==
Komoroski was the chief operating officer for the Cleveland Lumberjacks (1994–96).

Prior to joining the Cavaliers, Komoroski was the SVP of Business Operations for the Philadelphia Eagles from 1996 to 2003. Komoroski brought Eagles Television Network in-house, and played a leadership role in the development and commercialization of the NovaCare Complex and Lincoln Financial Field, including the brokering of the naming rights for each facility.

Komoroski led a group that purchased the Lake Erie Crushers in Avon, Ohio in March 2024.

In January 2025, Komoroski was announced as a board member and investor of English football club Sheffield United. The club was taken over by the consortium group COH Sports led by fellow American businessmen Steve Rosen and Helmy Eltoukhy. Komoroski was joined on the board of directors by director and producer Joe Russo and real estate figure Terry Ahern.

In April 2025, Komoroski was appointed a director of the Australian National Basketball League.

== See also ==
- List of National Basketball Association team presidents
