= Clemens Field =

Baseball stadium in Hannibal, Missouri

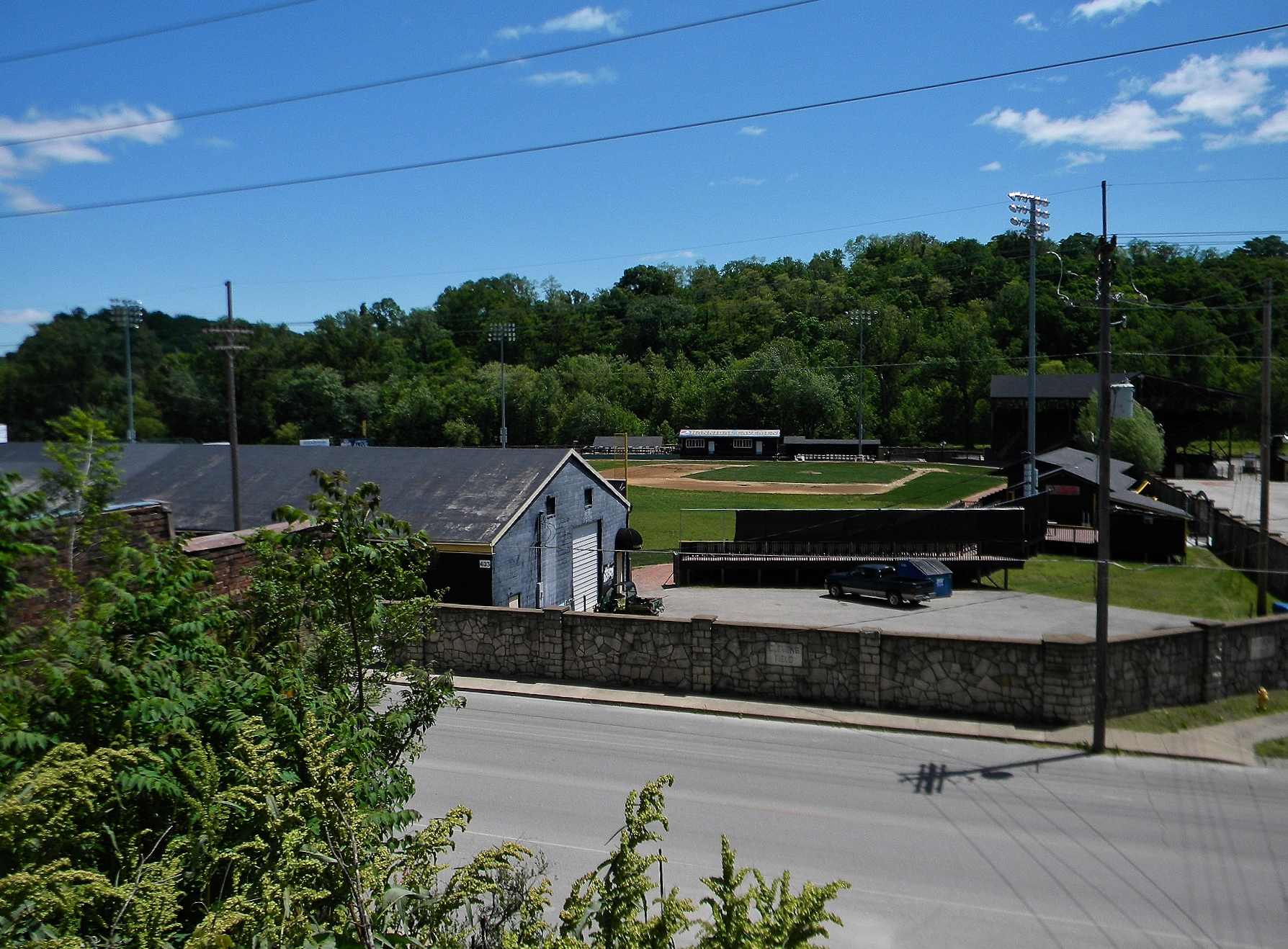

- Location within Missouri Location within the United States
- Interactive map of Clemens Field
- Address: 403 Warren Barrett Drive
- Location: Hannibal, Missouri, United States
- Coordinates: 39°42′18″N 91°21′35″W
- Owner: City of Hannibal
- Operator: Clemens Field Management
- Capacity: 2500
- Event: Sporting events
- Surface: Grass
- Scoreboard: Yes
- Field size: (LF-CF-RF): 328-303-308
- Public transit
- Clemens Field
- U.S. National Register of Historic Places
- Location: 403 Warren Barrett Drive, Hannibal, Missouri
- Area: 9.9 acres (4.0 ha)
- Built: 1939
- Architectural style: baseball diamond
- NRHP reference No.: 08000807
- Added to NRHP: August 26, 2008

Construction
- Built: 1936–1938
- Opened: 1939
- Renovated: 2008
- Expanded: 2008
- Cost: $100,000 ($40,0000 Works Project Administration grant) $3.3 Million renovation in 2008

Tenants
- Central Association; Hannibal Pilots (1947–48); Mississippi–Ohio Valley League; Hannibal Stags (1952); Hannibal Cardinals (1953–1954); Hannibal Citizens (1955); Prospect League; Hannibal Cavemen (2009–2016); Hannibal Hoots (2018–2019)

Clemens Field is a baseball stadium located at 403 Warren Barrett Drive, at the south end of downtown Hannibal, Missouri, United States.

The stadium was named for author and Hannibal resident Samuel Clemens, who was better known by his pen name Mark Twain. Built in 1938 to replace a previous field that was destroyed by fire, Clemens Field has served as a home for numerous minor league baseball teams. The ballpark underwent extensive renovations in 2008, and was most recently the home of the Hannibal Hoots of the collegiate summer Prospect League.

Clemens Field was listed on the National Register of Historic Places in 2008.

== History ==
First erected in 1924, the original Clemens Field was destroyed by fire on August 14, 1936. The replacement stadium was built as a Works Project Administration project in 1936–38. The park is listed on the National Register of Historic Places. The park has a limestone wall around the entire perimeter and a grandstand behind home plate. The same plans were used for Carson Park, a ballpark in Eau Claire, Wisconsin, which is also on the National Register.

Clemens Field tenants include the Hannibal Citizens (1955); Hannibal Cardinals (1953–1954); Hannibal Stags (1952) and Hannibal Pilots (1947–48) of the Mississippi–Ohio Valley League (1952–1955) and Central Association (1947–1948), the two leagues that simply changed names and were the direct predecessors of the Midwest League. Hannibal teams were affiliates of the St. Louis Cardinals (1953–1954) and St. Louis Browns (1947).

In 1944 the stadium was used as a German prisoner-of-war camp. The 200 POW's lived in tents, were surrounded by barbed wire and sorted military shoes for repair and reuse.

Clemens Field was used infrequently after minor league baseball left Hannibal in 1955. In 2008, Clemens Field received a major renovation that preserved the original grandstand and brick wall perimeter, added 2,500 seats and modern amenities.

The Hannibal Cavemen of the Prospect League folded after the conclusion of the 2016 season, and were replaced by the Hannibal Hoots in 2018. Flooding forced the Hoots franchise to relocate south to O'Fallon, Missouri after the 2019 season. As of 2020, Clemens Field now hosts local area youth and 16U summer leagues.

== Renovations ==
On June 10, 2008, a ceremony was held and renovations began on the ballpark. In the fall of 2007, Hannibal Baseball LLC worked with the City of Hannibal to bring a collegiate league team to Hannibal, targeting Clemens Field for renovations in the process. The 2007 Board of Directors for the upcoming Hannibal team and renovations included Arizona Diamondbacks GM Roland Hemond, St. Louis Cardinals GM Walt Jocketty, Philadelphia Phillies executive Lee Thomas, former Cardinals player and manager Red Schoendienst, and former Kansas City Royals player Frank White. The project was completed and the Hannibal Cavemen of the Prospect League began play in 2009.

The 3.3 million renovations project was honored in a presentation at the Missouri State Capital in 2010. The project received the Preserve Missouri Award from Missouri Preservation.

A new scoreboard and press box were installed prior to the 2012 season.

In 2016, a new entrance gate was added to the ballpark. Called the Jake Beckley .308 Gate, the gate was named for Baseball Hall of Fame player, Jake Beckley, who was a Hannibal player and native. The grandstand roof was also replaced for the 2016 season.
