= River City Rascals =

American professional baseball team

Logo
Cap insignia

Information
- League: Frontier League
- Location: O'Fallon, Missouri
- Ballpark: CarShield Field
- Founded: 1993
- Folded: 2019
- League championships: 3 (1993, 2010, 2019)
- Division championships: 6 (1993, 2000, 2009, 2010, 2011, 2014)
- Former name: River City Rascals (1999–2019); Zanesville Greys (1993–96)
- Colors: Black, cardinal, ecru
- Ownership: PS&J Professional Baseball
- General manager: David Schmoll
- Website: rivercityrascals.com

The River City Rascals were a professional baseball team based in O'Fallon, Missouri, in the United States. The Rascals were a member of the West Division of the Frontier League, which is not affiliated with Major League Baseball. From the 1999 season to 2019, the Rascals played their home games at CarShield Field.

== History ==
=== Zanesville Greys ===
The franchise began in 1993 as one of the original six teams of the independent Frontier League with teams from Ohio, Kentucky, and West Virginia. The Greys played in Zanesville, Ohio, at Gant Municipal Stadium, a historic 4,000-seat multipurpose stadium built in 1940. The Greys were the first professional baseball team to play in Zanesville since 1950 and the Zanesville Indians.

The Greys won both halves of the 1993 season and defeated the Ohio Valley Redcoats in the playoffs to become the first champions of the Frontier League. Zanesville had five players hit over .300 as well as solid pitching; Kyle Shade was named Frontier League MVP and Tom Crowley was named Most Valuable Pitcher. The Greys also led the league in attendance with an average of 1,000 fans per game.

Despite a 35–28 record in the 1994 season, the team finished in third place in the North Division behind Ohio Valley and Erie Sailors. The team returned to the playoffs in 1995 after a season characterized by solid pitching and baserunning. Despite only recording 12 home runs, the Greys led the league with 137 stolen bases. Zanesville swept the Newark Buffaloes two games to none in the Division Championship Series before falling to the Johnstown Steal in the Frontier League Championship Series. Closing pitcher, Don Wolfe was named League MVP and Playoff MVP in 1995. Wolfe had a league-leading 21 saves during the 1995 season.

Zanesville pitching was again strong in the 1996 season. The Greys were led by Matt Baxter with a 9–2 record and 2.47 ERA while the bullpen was led by Terry Pearson, who recorded 20 saves and a .50 ERA and stuck out 43 batters in 36 innings while only walking eight batters for the entire season. Pitching was not enough to make the playoffs and the team finished third in the FL East Division.

Although the team had a winning record in each of the three seasons in Zanesville, the franchise fell into financial trouble. This was partially due to the Greys' market being one of the smallest in the league with a population around 25,000. The franchise was inactive during the 1997 and 1998 seasons.

=== River City Rascals ===
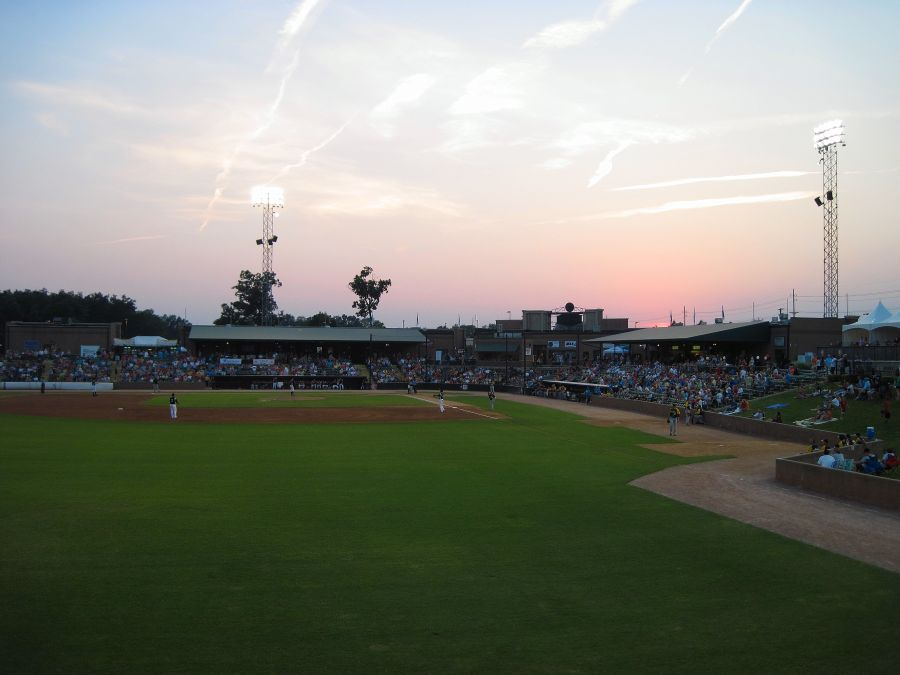
River City Rascals game in June 2011.

On Tuesday, October 27, 1998, O'Fallon, Missouri, Mayor Paul Renaud announced the new name of the team to be the "River City Rascals". Initial ownership of the Rascals consisted of a local group headed by Ken Wilson.

The Rascals began play in 1999 in the Western Division of the Frontier League under manager Jack Clark, pitching coach Greg Mathews, and first-base coach Dick Schofield Jr., all previous Major League Baseball players. The first game played was on Wednesday, June 2, 1999, on the road against the Cook County Cheetahs of Crestwood, Illinois. Pitcher Joey Pipes pitched a complete game in losing by a score of 1–0. The first home game was played on Tuesday, June 8, 1999, at T.R. Hughes Ballpark at the Ozzie Smith Sports Complex in front of an overflow crowd of 4,173 (3,500 seat capacity). The Rascals beat the Dubois County Dragons by a score of 6-5 by rallying from a 5–1 deficit with William Black scoring on Tim Still's sacrifice fly in the bottom of the ninth inning. This was the first minor league baseball game in Missouri since 1955. Under Clark, a former St. Louis Cardinals slugger, the team led the Frontier League in home runs, however only two pitchers had ERAs under 5.00. The move of the franchise from Zanesville to O'Fallon saw a major increase in attendance. The team averaged more than 150,000 fans in 1999 and set new franchise records in 2000 and again in 2002. The Rascals were named Frontier League Organization of the Year in 1999 and 2000; and Pat Daly was named Executive of the Year in 1999 followed by Matt Jones in 2002.

Clark left after the 1999 season to join the Los Angeles Dodgers as a hitting coach. He was replaced by Neil Fiala, who led the team to a West Division title in 2000 before losing in the first round of the playoffs to the Evansville Otters. The team just missed making the playoffs again in 2001, being eliminated on the last day of the season. The season was highlighted by outfielder Mike Robertson's 30-game hitting before being signed by the Boston Red Sox organization. Fiala resigned after the 2002 season and was replaced by former major-league catcher Marc Hill. Hill resigned after underperforming in the first half of the 2003 season and was replaced midseason by pitching coach Randy Martz.

Former pitcher Josh Kinney who played for the Rascals in 2001 (21 innings, 18 strikeouts, 1.71 ERA) became the first Rascal player, and second in franchise history, to make it to the Major Leagues. His contract was purchased from the Memphis Redbirds on July 2, 2006, by the St. Louis Cardinals where he appeared out of the bullpen during the 2006 regular season. His first major league pitch (July 3, 2006) was hit for a home run by Atlanta Braves left fielder Ryan Langerhans; Kinney finished the 2006 season winning a championship ring with the Cardinals as 2006 World Series Champions.

In 2005 the team auctioned off a "one-day professional contract" on eBay. Mark Skorlich, a 41-year-old Californian, won the auction with a $9,050 winning bid. The proceeds were donated to the local chapter of the United Way in nearby St. Louis. Coach Randy Martz started Skorlich in center field and the newly minted "pro" made a long throw from the right-center field gap into the cut-off man, but he saw no other action in the field. Local and national news outlets covered the story with the game being a sell-out.

Following the 2006 season the franchise was acquired by the group PS and J Professional Baseball Club, LLC headed by Steve Malliet, an experienced minor league executive in both affiliated and independent baseball. After declining attendance and a number of seasons without a winning record Malliet hired former Cincinnati Reds farmhand Toby Rumfield as the Rascals' manager for the 2007 season. Rumfield began remaking the team, with only a few players from the 2006 remaining on the roster. The rebuilding was not immediate and the team finished with a record of 36–60. The 2007 Rascals finished last in the league in both fielding and pitching and offense suffered after the team lost first baseman Bobby Mosby in a trade to the Northern League and outfielder Phil Laurent, who was signed by the San Diego Padres. Under Rumfield, pitching improved in 2008 and closer Mike Benacka recorded 13 saves and a 0.35 ERA in 22 games before signing with Oakland Athletics halfway through the season. The Rascals finished 4th in the West Division with a record of 47–49. Despite the improvement from 2006 Rumfield was replaced by Chad Parker, who previously managed the Macon Music of the South Coast League.

Parker continued the rebuilding process and focused on adding speed and strengthen pitching. Under Parker, seven players reached double figures in steals, led by OF Scott Houin with 35. Offense was led by Chad Maddox (.307) and Ryan Wehrle (.317), and in August, Frontier League all-star Ernie Banks was acquired from the Washington Wild Things and hit .353 on the season. The Rascals clinched a division title late in the regular season, marking the first time since 2000. In the first round of the playoffs the team defeated the Windy City ThunderBolts, the first playoff series win since 1995 in Zanesville. In the Frontier League Championship Series the Rascals won the first two games of the series before Lake Erie Crushers rallied with three straight wins. The Rascals ended the 2009 season with a franchise-record 56 wins and Parker was named Frontier League Coach of the Year.

Parker resigned following the season and was replaced by former River City pitcher Steve Brook. Brook continued the rebuilding from Parker and the team finished second in the West Division. The team won the first round playoff series against the Southern Illinois Miners and entered the Frontier League Championship Series for the second straight season, a first in franchise history. The Rascals defeated the Traverse City Beach Bums in four games and won the franchise's second championship and first as the Rascals.

In 2013, the Rascals and the City of O'Fallon, Missouri came to an agreement to extend their lease at TR Hughes Ballpark through the 2022 season. However, in October 2018 the city of O'Fallon locked the Rascals out of CarShield Field and terminated the lease, citing a lack of payment. The team's ownership disputed the claims of unpaid bills in a statement, and said it would play ball in 2019. The dispute was resolved with a new one-year lease in January 2019, opening a path for the Rascals season to continue as scheduled.

On August 12, 2019, the team announced that they would cease operations after the 2019 season. The Rascals defeated the Florence Freedom in a decisive Game 5 winning 7-5 thus securing the 2019 Championship in their final season.

== Season-by-season record ==
Division champions	Frontier League Champions

Season	League	Division	Regular season					Postseason	Awards
Season	League	Division	Finish	Wins	Losses	Win%	GB	Postseason	Awards
Zanesville Greys
1993	FL	West	1st	35	17	.673	—	Won FLCS vs. Ohio Valley Redcoats 2-0	1993 Kyle Shade, Most Valuable Player; 1993 Tom Crowley, Most Valuable Pitcher; 1993 Tom Venditelli, Manager Of the Year
1994	FL	North	3rd	35	28	.548	6.5		
1995	FL	—	3rd	37	31	.544	8.5	Won first round vs. Newark Buffaloes 2–0. Lost FLCS vs. Johnstown Steal 2–0.	Don Wolfe, Most Valuable Pitcher
1996	FL	East	3rd	41	33	.554	7.0		
River City Rascals
1999	FL	West	5th	39	45	.464	5		
2000	FL	West	1st	46	36	.561	—	Lost in first round vs. Evansville Otters 2–0.	Ryan Bauer, Most Valuable Pitcher
2001	FL	West	2nd	46	38	.548	2		
2002	FL	West	4th	39	45	.464	13		
2003	FL	West	4th	43	47	.478	8		
2004	FL	West	3rd	51	43	.543	6.5		Chris Klosterman, Frontier League All Star
2005	FL	West	4th	42	52	.447	10		
2006	FL	West	5th	40	56	.417	9		
2007	FL	West	3rd	36	60	.375	29.5		
2008	FL	West	5th	47	49	.490	13		
2009	FL	West	1st	56	38	.596	—	Won in first round vs. Windy City ThunderBolts 3–0. Lost in FLCS vs. Lake Erie Crushers 3–2.	Chad Parker, Manager Of the Year
2010	FL	West	2nd	57	38	.600	6.5	Won first round vs. Southern Illinois Miners 3-2; Won FLCS vs. Traverse City Beach Bums 3-1	
2011	FL	West	1st	68	27	.716	—	Won in first round vs. Southern Illinois Miners 3–1. Lost in FLCS vs. Joliet Slammers 3–1.	
2012	FL	West	4th	45	50	.474	11.5		
2013	FL	West	3rd	50	46	.521	9		Danny Canela, Rookie of the Year
2014	FL	West	1st	61	36	.629	—	Won in first round vs. Washington Wild Things 2–0. Lost in FLCS vs. Schaumburg Boomers 3–1.	Taylor Ard, Frontier League All Star; Saxon Butler, Frontier League All Star; Hector Crespo, Frontier League All Star; Josh Ludy, Frontier League All Star; Johnny Morales, Frontier League All Star; Gabe Shaw, Frontier League All Star
2015	FL	West	2nd	56	40	.583	5	Defeated Florence Freedom 6–5 in preliminary round. Won in first round vs. Southern Illinois Miners 2–1. Lost in FLCS vs. Traverse City Beach Bums 3–0.	Taylor Ard, Most Valuable Player; Taylor Ard, Frontier League All Star; Curran Redal, Frontier League All Star; Josh Ludy, Frontier League All Star; Danny Canela, Frontier League All Star; Brian Hansen, Frontier League All Star
2016	FL	West	2nd	49	47	.510	14	Won in first round vs. Southern Illinois Miners 2–1. Lost in FLCS vs. Evansville Otters 3–2.	Josh Ludy, Frontier League All Star; Zac Treece, Frontier League All Star; Nick Kennedy, Frank Riordan Award (Citizenship)
Totals					Wins	Losses	Win%		
Totals					127	93	.577	All-time Zanesville Greys record (1993–1996)	
Totals					869	804	.519	All-time River City Rascals record (1999–2016)	
Totals					30	26	.536	All-time franchise postseason record	

== Greys/Rascals in Major League Baseball ==
- Justin Christian (River City 2003–04) most recently pitched in the Tampa Bay Rays system. He played for the New York Yankees in 2008, and the San Francisco Giants in 2011–2012.
- Josh Kinney (River City 2001) most recently pitched in the Pittsburgh Pirates system. He pitched for St. Louis Cardinals in 2006 and 2008–2009, the Chicago White Sox in 2011, and Mariners in 2012.
- Terry Pearson (Zanesville 1995–96) pitched for the Detroit Tigers in 2002.
- Joe Thatcher (River City 2004–05) pitched for the San Diego Padres from 2007 to 2013, the Arizona Diamondbacks 2013–2014, the Los Angeles Angels of Anaheim 2014, and the Houston Astros in 2015.
