= Hannibal Cavemen =

Collegiate summer league baseball team

- Logo

Information
- League: Prospect League (West Division)
- Location: Hannibal, Missouri
- Ballpark: Clemens Field
- Founded: 2009
- Folded: 2016
- Colors: Black, yellow, white, gray, dark yellow, gray, pale yellow
- Ownership: Rick DeStefane (co-owner)
- Manager: Dick "LT" Dent (2016); Greg McVey (2015); Jay Hemond (2009–2014)
- Media: Hannibal Courier-Post

The Hannibal Cavemen were a collegiate summer league baseball team located in Hannibal, Missouri, in the United States. They were a member of the West Division of the summer collegiate Prospect League from 2009–2016. The franchise began playing again as the Hannibal Hoots, in 2018.

== History ==
Built in 1938, Clemens Field had fallen into disrepair by the mid-2000s. Having last hosted professional baseball and the Hannibal Stags in 1955, the city debated whether Clemens Field was worth preserving. Soon afterwards, a group led by Roland Hemond (advisor to Arizona Diamondbacks president Derrick Hall) stepped forward with a plan to renovate Clemens Field and make it home to a 2009 team in the Central Illinois Collegiate League (CICL).

On June 10, 2008, ground was broken for Clemens Field's renovation. Almost two months later, on August 1, 2008, the Cavemen announced their name, which was a homage to the numerous caves in Hannibal which are popular with tourists.

On November 11, 2008, the CICL announced it was merging into the new Prospect League, which the Cavemen joined as a member of the West Division, beginning in the 2009 season.

On January 6, 2017, the Prospect League announced that the Hannibal franchise had elected to suspend operations for the 2017 season. The franchise began playing again as the Hannibal Hoots, starting with the 2018 season.

== Overall Records by Year ==
Year	Wins	Losses	Pct	GB	Division	Manager	Playoffs
2009	20	33	.377	14.5	6th West	Jay Hemond	dnq
2010	27	28	.491	8.5	4th West	Jay Hemond	dnq
2011	29	26	.527	8.5	4th West	Jay Hemond	dnq
2012	31	29	.517	7	4th West	Jay Hemond	dnq
2013	29	28	.509	10.5	4th West	Jay Hemond	dnq
2014	25	35	.417	14.5	4th West	Jay Hemond	dnq
2015	16	40	.286	25	6th West	Greg McVey	dnq
2016	13	47	.217	26.5	6th West	Dick "LT" Dent	dnq
