= Tim Epling =

American baseball manager

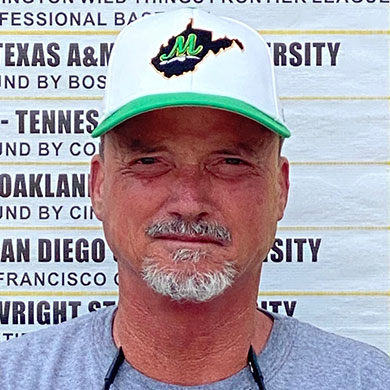
- Epling (undated photo)
- Born: November 9, 1962 (age 63); Beckley, West Virginia, U.S.
- Education: Methodist University
- Occupations: Baseball manager, sports coach
- Spouse: Diane Epling (née Sumpter)

Timothy Douglas Epling (born November 9, 1962) is an American former baseball manager, coach and Christian minister who was the manager of the West Virginia Miners, an amateur collegiate baseball team part of the Eastern Conference of the Prospect League, from 2010 to 2018.

His parents, Doug and Linda Epling, own the Linda K. Epling Stadium in Beckley, West Virginia.

== Early life ==
Tim Epling was born on November 9, 1962 in Beckley, West Virginia, to businesspeople Linda and Doug Epling. Doug Epling, a coal baron of three coal mines, owns the Linda K. Epling Stadium in Beckley along with his wife, Linda.

Epling graduated from Woodrow Wilson High School in 1981. He attended Methodist University in North Carolina for college.

== Baseball career ==
In his college years, Epling pitched for the North Carolina Methodist College baseball team where they finished #3 and #5 in the country in separate seasons from 1981 to 1983.

From 1985 to 1990, he was the field manager of the Liberty High School baseball team, a high school located in Raleigh County, West Virginia. At the high school, he led the baseball program to its first-ever Sectional Championship. In five seasons, he achieved a 101-32 record.

From 2001 to 2008, he served as the head coach of the West Virginia Tech baseball team.

Epling was the manager and coach of the West Virginia Miners, based at the Linda K. Epling Stadium in Beckley; owned by his parents from 2010 to 2018. He came out of retirement in October 2019, and decided to coach with the Miners again solely as a general manager.

In 2023, the West Virginia Miners were defunct.

=== Miners stats ===
The following are the stats of the West Virginia Miners baseball team during Epling's tenure as manager/head coach:

Season	Manager	Record	Win %	League	Division	GB	Post-season record	Post-season win %	Post-season result	Notes
2010	Tim Epling	26–30	.464	10th	2nd	13.0	0–0	.000	Did not qualify	
2011	Tim Epling	29–27	.518	5th	1st	–	1–1	.500	Won East Division Championship (Slippery Rock) Lost Prospect League Championship (Quincy)	
2012	Tim Epling	40–19	.678	1st	1st	–	3–0	1.000	Won East Division Championship (Chillicothe) Won Prospect League Championship (Dubois County)	
2013	Tim Epling	38–22	.633	2nd	1st	–	4–0	1.000	Won East Division Championship (Chillicothe) Won Prospect League Championship (Quincy)	
2014	Tim Epling	38–22	.633	4th	3rd	2.0	0–0	.000	Did not qualify	
2015	Tim Epling	35–24	.593	3rd	2nd	2.5	2–3	.400	Won East Division Championship (Chillicothe) Lost Prospect League Championship (Terre Haute)	
2016	Tim Epling	34–25	.576	5th	1st	–	4–0	1.000	Won East Division Championship (Kokomo) Won Prospect League Championship (Quincy)	
2017	Tim Epling	30–28	.517	4th	2nd	6.0	0–2	.000	Lost East Division Championship (Butler)	
2018	Tim Epling	30–29	.508	6th	3rd	7.0	0–0	.000	Did not qualify	
2019	Mike Syrett	18–42	.300	11th	6th	22.0	0–0	.000	Did not qualify	
2020	Season cancelled (COVID-19 pandemic)									
2021	Tim Epling	23–36	.390	15th	4th	12.5	0–0	.000	Did not qualify	
2022	Tim Epling	20–37	.351	15th	4th	16.5	0–0	.000	Did not qualify	
Totals		361–341	.514				14–6	.700		

== Christian ministry ==
Epling is a co-founder of Destiny Ministries with his wife, Diane. Diane Epling authored a Christian book, Time With God, released in 2022. The ministry has hosted several Christian events in the Beckley area.

== Personal life ==
=== Legal ===
On January 23, 2024, Epling filed a lawsuit against the City of Beckley, citing a violation of West Virginia state code by city officials; arguing "a recent decision to operate under a city manager and weak mayor-style of government violates West Virginia Code."
