= Dugan Field =

Baseball stadium in Nashville, Tennessee, US

Ken Dugan Field at Stephen Lee Marsh Stadium
- Interactive map of Ken Dugan Field at Stephen Lee Marsh Stadium
- Location: 4201 Granny White Pike; Nashville, Tennessee; United States
- Coordinates: 36.102853°N 86.79913°W
- Owner: Lipscomb University
- Capacity: 1,500
- Surface: Natural grass with artificial turf halo around home plate
- Field size: Left field: 330 ft (100 m); Center field: 405 ft (123 m); Right field: 330 ft (100 m)

Construction
- Opened: 1991
- Renovated: 2005, 2007
- Cost: $1 million ($2.36 million in 2025 dollars)

Tenants
- Lipscomb Bisons (NCAA) 1991–present Nashville Outlaws (PL) 2011

Ken Dugan Field at Stephen Lee Marsh Stadium is a baseball stadium located in Nashville, Tennessee, United States. It has been home to the Lipscomb Bisons college baseball team of the NCAA's Division I ASUN Conference since 1991. The facility has a capacity of 1,500 spectators. The playing surface is named after Ken Dugan, Lipscomb baseball coach from 1960 to 1996 and winner of over 1,000 games as head of the program. The surrounding facility is named after Stephen Lee Marsh. The ballpark served as the home of the Nashville Outlaws of the collegiate summer Prospect League in 2011.

== History ==
Since the late 1940s, the Lipscomb baseball team played at a field next to Belmont Boulevard, an area close to Ken Dugan Field's modern location. This field was known as Onion Dell until 1984, when it was dedicated as Ken Dugan Field. When the baseball program moved nearby to a new, $1-million facility in 1991, the name was kept. On March 17, 2005, the facility was rechristened Ken Dugan Field at Stephen Lee Marsh Stadium.

In 2005, as part of the venue's renaming, stadium lighting was installed. In 2007, $50,000 in renovations added a warning track and an artificial turf halo around home plate.

Dugan Field hosted the Atlantic Sun baseball tournament in 2010, 2011, and 2016.

The Nashville Outlaws of the Prospect League played at Ken Dugan Field in 2011, after spending their inaugural 2010 season at Vanderbilt University's Hawkins Field.

== See also ==
- List of NCAA Division I baseball venues
