= Don McBride Stadium =

Baseball stadium in Richmond, Indiana, US

- Location within Indiana Location within the United States
- Interactive map of Don McBride Stadium
- Full name: John Cate Field at Don McBride Stadium
- Former names: Municipal Stadium (1936–1984)
- Address: 201 NW 13th Street; Richmond, Indiana
- Coordinates: 39.8321°N 84.9198°W
- Owner: Richmond Community Schools
- Operator: Richmond Community Schools
- Capacity: 1,787

Construction
- Opened: August 1936
- Renovated: 1995

Tenants
- Richmond Roses (OSL) 1946–1947; Richmond Roses / Robins / Tigers (OIL) 1948–1952; Richmond Roosters (FL) 1995–2005; Richmond Red Devils (IHSAA); Seton Catholic Cardinals (IHSAA); Earlham College Quakers (NCAA); Richmond RiverRats (PL) 2009–2015; Richmond Jazz (GLSCL) 2016–2023; Richmond Flying Mummies (NWL) 2026–present

Don McBride Stadium is a baseball park built in 1936 at the corner of Northwest 13th Street and Peacock Road in Richmond, Indiana, funded by the Works Progress Administration. The stadium was built to replace Exhibition Park which was destroyed by a fire in 1935. Originally named Municipal Stadium, it was renamed in June 1984 after Joseph Donald McBride, the former director of the Richmond Parks Department who oversaw development of the stadium. On June 4, 2010, the name was expanded to John Cate Field at Don McBride Stadium, honoring a former Richmond High School baseball coach.

The ballpark has hosted three minor-league baseball teams and one independent league baseball team over the years: the Richmond Roses (1946–1948), the Richmond Robins (1949), the Richmond Tigers (1950–1952) and the Richmond Roosters (1995–2005). Various touring Negro League teams also played games at Municipal Stadium during the 1930s through 1950s. The stadium has also hosted the Richmond High School, Seton Catholic High School, and Earlham College teams. It was home to the Richmond RiverRats of the collegiate summer Prospect League from 2009 to 2015 and the Richmond Jazz of the Great Lakes Summer Collegiate League from 2016 to 2023. A new team in the Northwoods League, the Richmond Flying Mummies, is set to begin play in 2026.

The stadium features a small covered grandstand. Seating capacity is 1,787. It was renovated in 1995.

In October 2023, the city of Richmond sold McBride Stadium to the Richmond Community Schools (RCS). In September 2024, RCS approved a three-year lease agreement with the Northwoods League to use the ballpark for a collegiate summer baseball team in 2025, with league options to renew for two additional five-year terms. On March 29, 2025, the Northwoods League officially announced that the new team would begin play in the 2026 season, with the team name and branding to be revealed at a later date. The team will play in the Great Lakes East division. A name-the-team contest was held in June 2025, with five finalist names announced in July (the Richmond Wampus Cats, the Richmond Stardust, the Richmond Flying Mummies, the Richmond Groove, and the Richmond Plastic Dinos). After a fan vote, the Flying Mummies was revealed as the winning name in October. The team colors will be brown, red, white, and black, to mostly match the colors used by the Richmond Red Devils (who share the stadium).

== Notes ==
Events and tenants
Preceded by Point Stadium; V.A. Memorial Stadium	Host of the FL All-Star Game; Don McBride Stadium; 1996; 1998	Succeeded by V.A. Memorial Stadium; League Stadium
