= Richmond Flying Mummies =

Baseball team in Indiana, United States

- Logo

Information
- League: Northwoods League (Great Lakes East Division)
- Location: Richmond, Indiana
- Ballpark: Don McBride Stadium
- Founded: 2025
- Colors: Nightfall Black, Redmond Red, Mummy Gold, Linen Gray, White
- Mascot: Wilbur the Rooster
- Ownership: Matt Bomberg, Ryan Voz, Jon Gries, Chris Nelson & Jared Vasiliauskas
- General manager: Trevor Amerson
- Manager: Mason Rapp
- Media: Richmond Palladium-Item
- Website: northwoodsleague.com/richmond-flying-mummies/

The Richmond Flying Mummies are a baseball team that plays in the collegiate summer Northwoods League. Based in Richmond, Indiana, the team began play on May 25, 2026. The Flying Mummies play their home games at historic Don McBride Stadium, built in 1936.

== History ==
On March 29, 2025, the Northwoods League announced the addition of Richmond as an expansion team for the 2026 season. McBride Stadium had previously hosted a number of minor league and amateur baseball teams over the years, including the Richmond Roosters of the Frontier League. Among the owners of the Flying Mummies are actors Jon Gries, Jon Heder, and Efren Ramirez, three of the stars of Napoleon Dynamite.

== Brand ==
In October 2025, the team announced their nickname and unveiled their branding. The "Flying" part of the nickname is a reference to the Wright Brothers, who lived in Richmond as children before moving to Dayton, OH. The "Mummies" is a reference to two Egyptian mummies that are housed at the Wayne County Historical Museum and at the Joseph Moore Museum of Natural History on the campus of Earlham College. Their mascot is Wilbur, a rooster wrapped up like a mummy and wearing uniform number 67 (a reference to the viral "6-7" meme of 2025). Wilbur, named after Wilbur Wright, also pays homage to an earlier Richmond baseball team, the Richmond Roosters.

== Roster ==
Richmond Flying Mummies roster
| Players | Coaches/Other |
|---|---|
| Pitchers: 15 Jacob Bardwell; 14 Nathan Bardwell; 32 Tyler Biddinger; 36 Parker Bleck; 4 Casey Blevins; 9 Grayson Bradberry; 21 Danny Harris; 1 JJ Jackson; 13 Nick Julian; 6 Kai Keamo; 20 Parker Meifert; 25 Elias Murdock; 9 Brendan Murphy; 0 Zach Neville; 26 Beau Pasteur; 19 Owen Walsh; 16 Owen Weeks; Catchers: 22 Jase Horton; 3 Trenton Lombardo; Infielders: 17 Braeden Becker; 18 Eli Bennett; 23 Peyton Bittle; 28 Jimmy Chadwell; 33 Caden Fahy; 5 Landen Fry; 12 Ashton Seymore; Outfielders: 8 Prince Deboskie; 7 Cal Schembra; 2 Jackson Thomas | Manager: -- Mason Rapp; Coaches: -- --; -- --; 7-day injured list; ~ Development list; # Rehab assignment; ∞ Reserve list; ‡ Restricted list; § Suspended list; † Temporarily inactive list; → More MiLB rosters |
