= Lorain County Ironmen =

Information
- League: Great Lakes Summer Collegiate League
- Location: Lorain, Ohio
- Ballpark: The Pipe Yard
- Founded: 2009
- Former name: Lorain County Ironmen (2010-present); NorthCoast Knights (2009)
- Former league: Prospect League
- Colors: Black, Silver, Gold, Red
- Ownership: RS Entertainment

The Lorain County Ironmen are a collegiate summer wood-bat baseball team based in Lorain, Ohio, which is part of the Greater Cleveland metropolitan area. Formerly known as the NorthCoast Knights, the name was changed in 2010 when the franchise came under new ownership. They are a member of the Great Lakes Summer Collegiate League and play their home games at The Pipe Yard.

The Ironmen did not play the 2015 Prospect League season due to its franchise rights being transferred to the Jamestown Jammers.

== Seasons ==
Year	W-L	PCT	Place	Postseason
2009	--	--	--	
Total	--	--	--	
2010	--	--	--	
Total	--	--	--	
2011	--	--	--	
Total	--	--	--	
2012	--	--	--	
Total	--	--	--	
