= Hawkins Field =

Baseball park at Vanderbilt University

- "The Hawk"
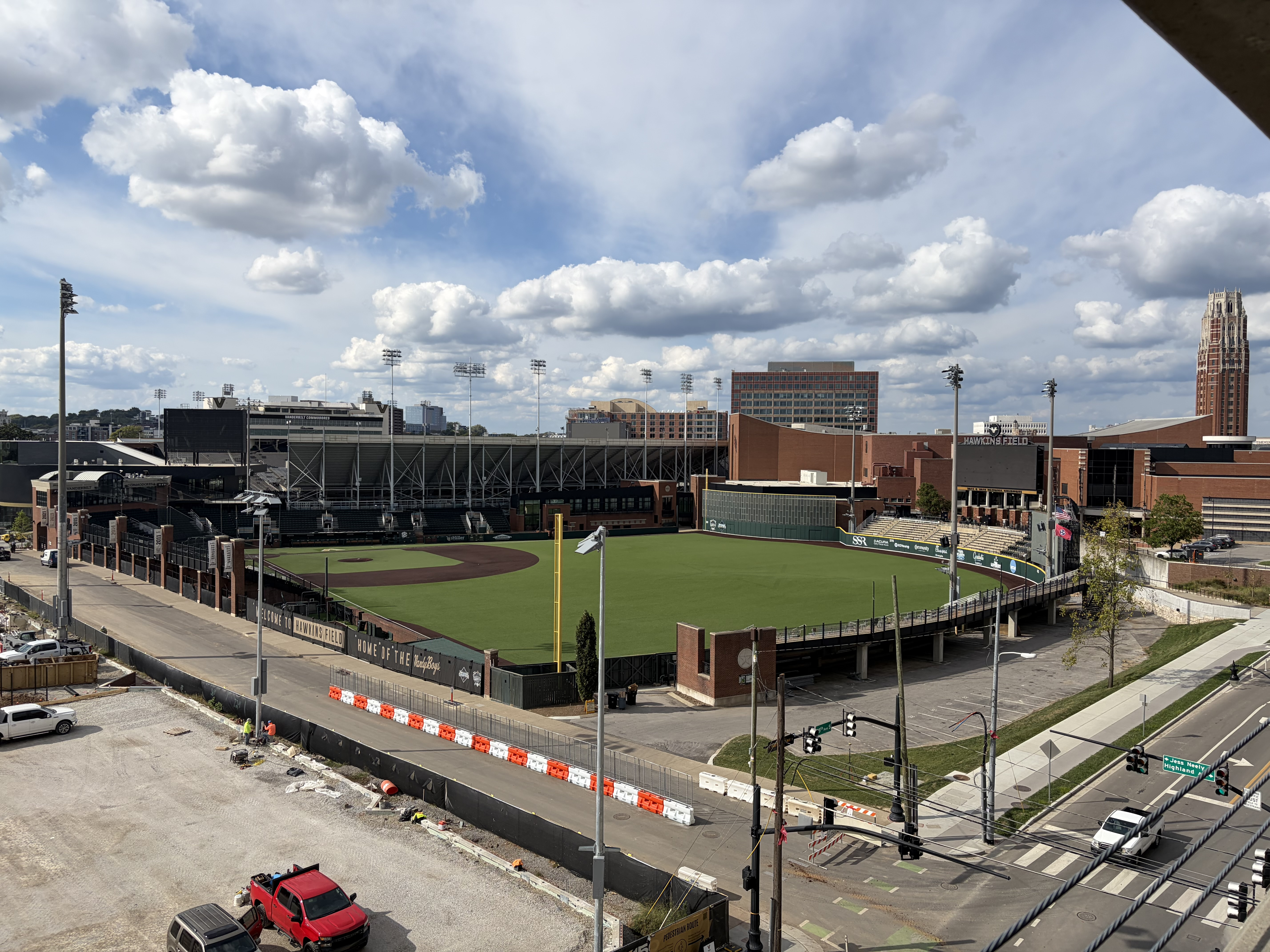
- Interactive map of Hawkins Field
- Location: 2600 Jess Neely Drive; Nashville, Tennessee, U.S.
- Coordinates: 36.1428°N 86.8077°W
- Owner: Vanderbilt University
- Capacity: 3,700
- Surface: AstroTurf GameDay Grass 3D
- Field size: Left Field: 310 feet (94 m); Left-Center: 375 feet (114 m); Center Field: 400 feet (120 m); Right-Center: 375 feet (114 m); Right Field: 330 feet (100 m)

Construction
- Opened: 2002
- Renovated: 2006, 2007, 2009, 2012, 2016, 2018

Tenants
- Vanderbilt Commodores (SEC) 2002–present Nashville Outlaws (PL) 2010

Hawkins Field is a baseball stadium in Nashville, Tennessee. It is the home field of the Vanderbilt Commodores college baseball team. The stadium opened in 2002 adjacent to FirstBank Stadium and Memorial Gymnasium and holds 3,700 people. In 2010, the Nashville Outlaws, a collegiate summer baseball team of the Prospect League, used Hawkins Field as their home ballpark.

The venue is named for the family of Charles Hawkins III, a benefactor of the university and baseball program.

== Features ==
The Vanderbilt athletics site describes its "brick and wrought-iron fence design." Its left field wall is 35 feet high, a comparable height to the Green Monster at Fenway Park. Memorial Gymnasium is behind the left field fence, and FirstBank Stadium's east bleachers are adjacent to the third base stands.

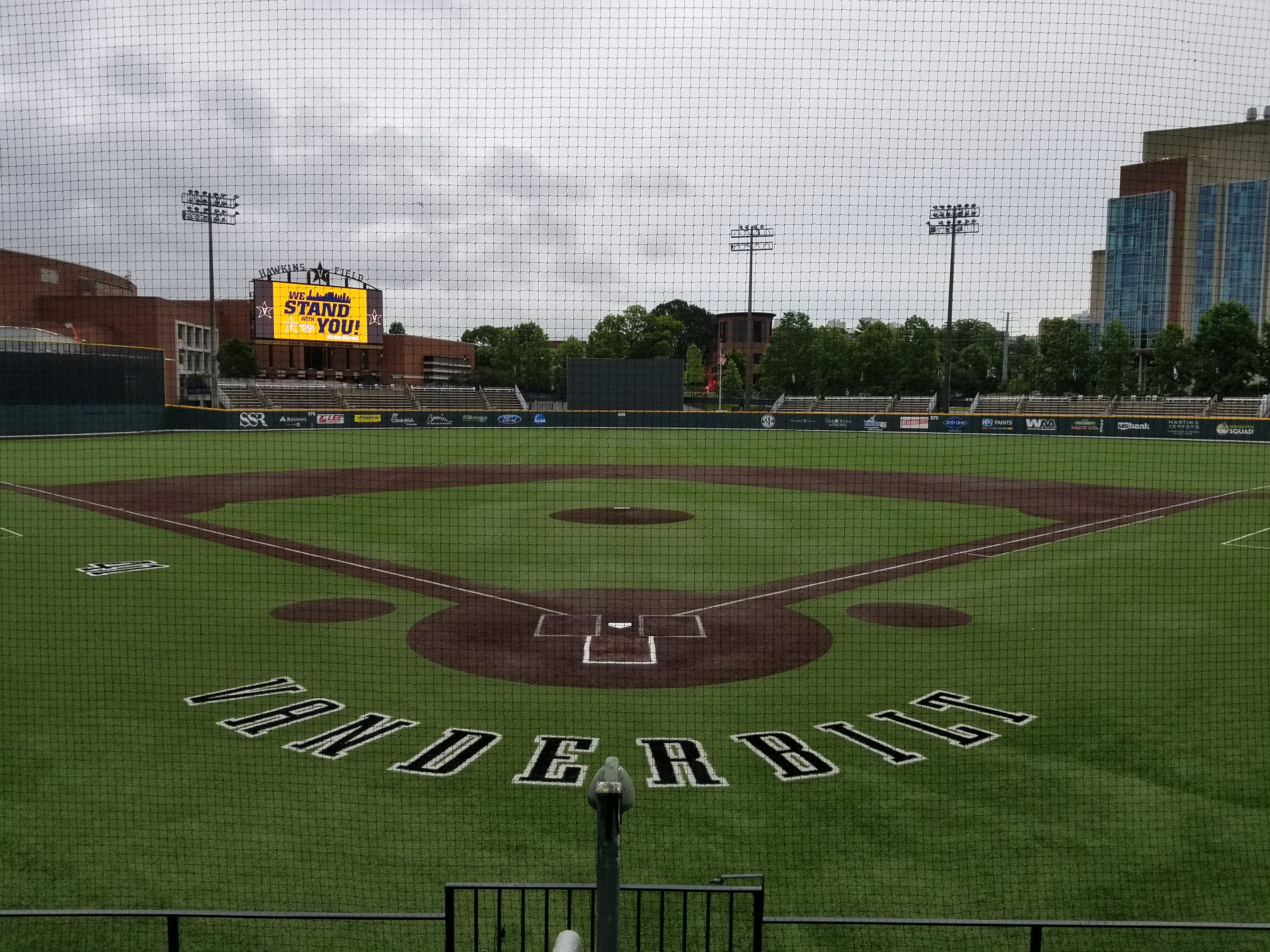
View of Hawkins Field from Home Plate

=== Renovations ===
In 2006, a complex including a locker room, offices, and a weight room was added along the third base line.

In 2007, Hawkins Field was selected as a regional host site for the 2007 NCAA Division I baseball tournament. Vanderbilt and Hawkins Field again hosted Regionals in 2011, 2013, 2014, 2015, 2016, 2018, 2019, 2021, and 2023 and hosted Super Regionals in 2011, 2013, 2014, 2015, 2018, 2019, 2021, and 2023. A new scoreboard was erected and new temporary bleachers were added in right field to bring the capacity to near 3,700 for the tournament (and also the 2008 season). In late 2008, further expansions increased the stadium's permanent seating capacity to 3,700. This includes 2,200 chairback seats and 1,500 bleacher seats. The dugouts were also renovated and a new trainer's room added. In 2012, artificial turf replaced the grass playing field.

== Attendance ==
In 2024, the Commodores ranked 22nd among Division I baseball programs in attendance, averaging 3,597 per home game.

== See also ==
- List of NCAA Division I baseball venues
