= Quincy Doggy Paddlers =

- Logo

Information
- League: Prospect League (Western Conference – Northwest Division)
- Location: Quincy, Illinois
- Ballpark: QU Stadium
- Founded: 2025
- League championships: 0
- Division championships: 1 (2026)
- Colors: Brown, light blue, black, tan, white
- Mascot: Dinger
- Ownership: Golden Rule Entertainment & Tim Hoker
- General manager: Mackenzie Schissel
- Manager: Kyle Fultz
- Media: Quincy Herald Whig, WGEM, KHQA-TV
- Website: paddlersbaseball.com

The Quincy Doggy Paddlers are a collegiate summer league baseball team of the Prospect League. They are located in Quincy, Illinois, and play their home games at QU Stadium. The Doggy Paddlers and other collegiate summer leagues and teams exist to give top college players a professional-like experience without affecting NCAA eligibility.

The Doggy Paddlers play in the Prospect League's Western Conference – Northwest Division along with the Burlington Bees, Clinton LumberKings, Illinois Valley Pistol Shrimp, and Normal CornBelters.

== History ==
Quincy's previous team in the Prospect League, the Quincy Gems were sold & relocated to Hendersonville, Tennessee and rebranded as the Full Count Rhythm, who played in the Prospect League in 2024, but left after the 2024 season to join the Ohio Valley League. The Gems departure left the city without a team in 2024.

On November 15, 2024, the Prospect League announced that a new franchise had been awarded to the city of Quincy, with Golden Rule Entertainment and Tim Hoker as the owners of the team.

On March 21, 2025, the team was officially named the Doggy Paddlers.

== Stadium ==
The Doggy Paddlers play at QU Stadium, a 2,500-seat facility owned and operated by Quincy University. The facility was built in 1938 and is located at 1800 Sycamore Street in Quincy.

== Seasons ==
Season	Manager	Record	Win %	League	Division	GB	Post-season record	Post-season win %	Post-season result	Notes
2025	Brad Gyorkos	16–38	.296	17th	4th	18.5	0–0	.000	Did not qualify	Inaugural season
2026	Kyle Fultz	26–29	.473	13th	4th	8.5	1–1	.500	Won Northwest Division Championship (Burlington); Lost Western Conference Championship (Cape)	
Totals		42–67	.385				1–1	.500		

== Roster ==
Quincy Doggy Paddlers roster
Active roster	Coaching staff
Pitchers: 6 Lincoln Bergman; 22 Talan Case; 27 Tyler Dance; 37 Jack Duncan; 38 Raiden Ericson; 29 Sam Hall; 25 Austin Hunter; 16 Alex Logan; 18 Adrien Marquez; 30 Ethan McMasters; 31 Mitchell Meier; 9 Kael O'Donnell; 35 Jonny Rossi; 21 Karl Schiebe; 32 Alexandros Simecek; 36 Kyle Smith; 2 Braden Wilson; 12 Nick Wilson; Catchers: 17 Josh McGuin; 19 Raul Ramirez; 33 Brodie Short; 24 Bruce Trzpis; Infielders: 14 Ean Czech; 26 Harry Fandre; 11 Ignacio Gonzalez; 1 Nick Griffith; 15 Brady Kindhart; 7 Lane Olson; 34 Jamie Rasmussen; 13 John Shuey; 28 Dean Staudacher; Outfielders: 10 Juan Concepcion; 5 Ari Fivelson; 44 Kamryn Link; 8 Bynum Martinez; 20 Taylor Tatum	Manager: -- Kyle Fultz; Coaches: -- Sebastian Figga (hitting); -- Tyler Zylstra (pitching); Disabled list; ‡ Inactive list; § Suspended list; updated July 9, 2026
