= League Stadium =

Baseball stadium in Huntingburg, Indiana, US

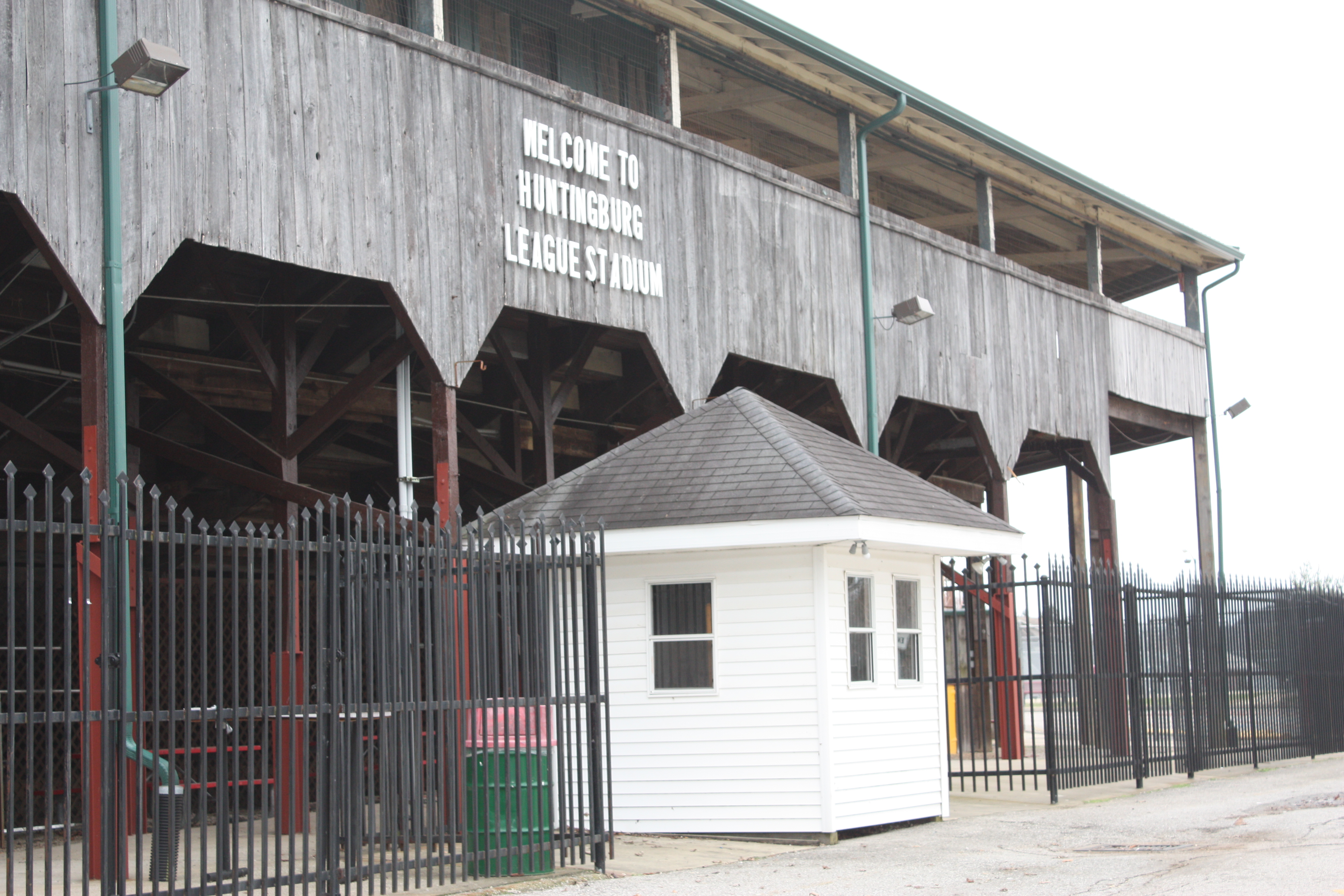
- Interactive map of League Stadium
- Location: 203 S. Cherry Street, Huntingburg, Indiana, USA
- Coordinates: 38.290294°N 86.945125°W
- Owner: City of Huntingburg
- Operator: City of Huntingburg
- Capacity: 3,300
- Surface: Grass
- Field size: 332 ft (101 m) (LF); 385 ft (117 m) (CF); 320 ft (98 m) (RF)

Construction
- Opened: 1894
- Renovated: 1991

Tenants
- Southridge High School Raiders (IHSAA - PAC); Dubois County Dragons (HL/FL) 1996–1998, 1999–2001; Dubois County Bombers (CICL/PL/OVL) 2005–present

League Stadium is a historic baseball stadium in Huntingburg, Indiana, United States, located at 203 South Cherry Street. Originally built in 1894, League Stadium is the currently home of the Dubois County Bombers of the collegiate summer Prospect League. The stadium was formerly the home of the Dubois County Dragons in the independent Heartland (1996–1998) and Frontier Leagues (1999–2002) until the team moved to Kenosha, Wisconsin in 2003. The Southridge Raiders, an Indiana High School Athletic Association 3A baseball team, also uses the stadium as home field.

The ballpark opened in 1894 and was renovated in 1991 by Columbia Pictures for the filming of A League of Their Own, adding additional seating to the park while maintaining the original grandstand. In 1995, the stadium served as the set of Soul of the Game, an HBO movie. The ballpark currently has a capacity of approximately 3,300 people after the 2021 addition of the new 'Upper Deck & Patio' along the left field baseline and new, extra-large MLB-style stadium seats in 2023.

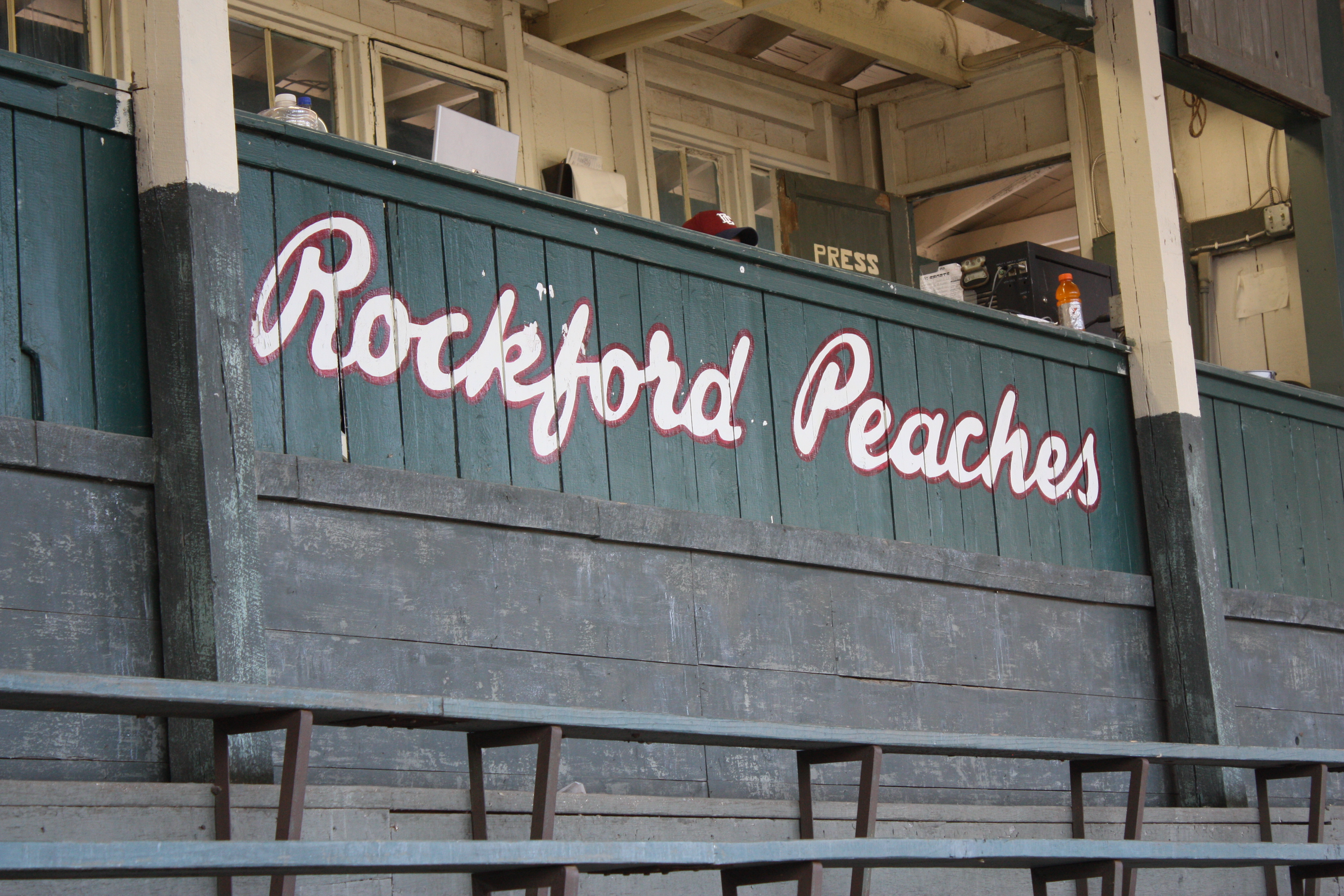
League Stadium was used in the movie A League of Their Own

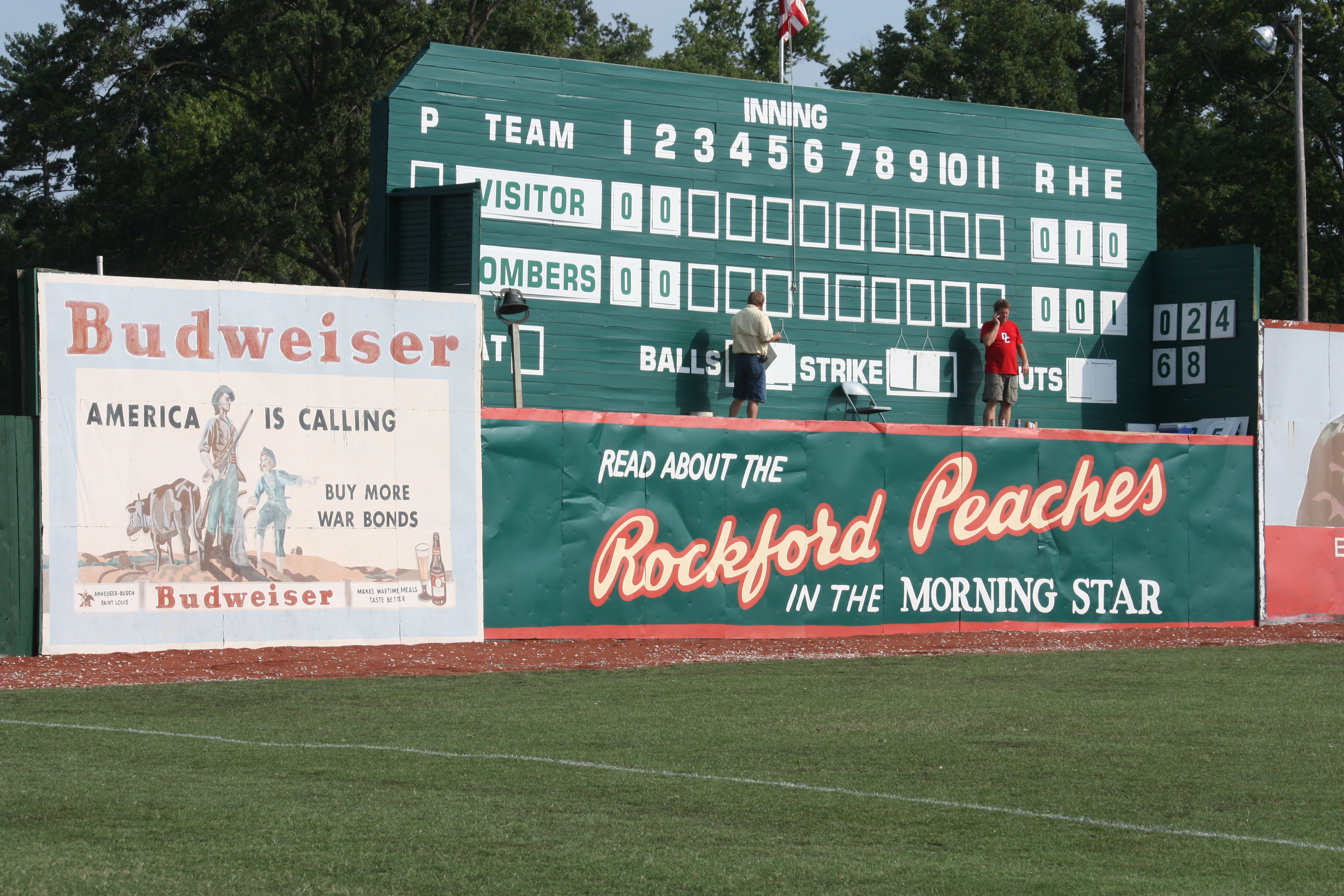

== Dimensions ==
- Left field – 332 ft (101 m)
- Center field – 385 ft (117 m)
- Right field – 320 ft (98 m)

Events and tenants
Preceded by Don McBride Stadium	Host of the FL All-Star Game; League Stadium; 1999	Succeeded by T.R. Hughes Ballpark
