= Richmond RiverRats =

Baseball team in Indiana, US (2009–2015)

Information
- League: Prospect League (Central Division)
- Location: Richmond, Indiana
- Ballpark: John Cate Field at Don McBride Stadium
- Founded: 2009
- Folded: 2015
- Former name(s): Richmond RiverRats (2009-2015)
- Colors: Navy Blue, Gold, White
- Ownership: Richmond CWB, LLC
- Management: Deanna Beaman (GM)
- Manager: Tyler Lairson
- Website: RichmondRiverRats.com

The Richmond RiverRats were a collegiate summer baseball team based in Richmond, Indiana. They were a member of the summer collegiate Prospect League from their founding in 2009 until their last season in 2015.

The RiverRats played at the 1,787-seat Don McBride Stadium.

== Seasons ==
Year	W-L	PCT	Place	Postseason
2009	26-28	.481	4th East	--
2010	30-26	.536	3rd East	--
2011	26-30	.464	5th East	--
2012	33-26	.559	3rd East	--
2013	24-36	.400	5th East	--
2014	24-35	.407	4th East	--
2015	22-35	.386	6th East	--
Total	185-216	.461	--	--

== Players of the Year ==
Year	Winner	Team
2009	Tyler Bullock (C)	Richmond River Rats

Prospect League Batting Title: Joseph Villegas, OF - .363

== Players Drafted to Major League Teams ==
Major League Team	Year	Player
Chicago White Sox	2012 (undrafted free agent)	Callahan Bowling
San Francisco Giants	2010 (30th Round)	Ryan Bradley
Los Angeles Dodgers	2011 (26th Round)	Freddie Cabrera
Chicago Cubs	2012 (17th Round)	Nathan Dorris
Chicago White Sox	2013 (22nd Round)	Nolan Earley
Kansas City Royals	2014 (34th Round)	Todd Eaton
Arizona Diamondbacks	2010 (17th Round)	Derek Eitel
Cincinnati Reds	2010 (36th Round)	Chuck Ghysels
Kansas City Royals	2010 (14th Round)	Mike Giovenco
Los Angeles Angels	2012 (19th Round)	Aaron Newcomb
New York Mets	2012 (1st Round, 35th Pick)	Kevin Plawecki (first RiverRat to make it to the Majors)
San Diego Padres	2014 (17th Round)	T.J. Weir
Chicago White Sox	2010 (25th Round)	Ethan Wilson
