= Nashville Outlaws =

Team logo
Cap insignia

Information
- League: Prospect League (2010–11) (Central Division (2010–11))
- Location: Nashville, Tennessee
- Founded: 2010
- Disbanded: 2011
- League championships: none
- Former ballparks: Ken Dugan Field at Stephen Lee Marsh Stadium (2011); Hawkins Field (2010)
- Colors: Black, gold, white
- Ownership: Nashville Baseball Club LLC

The Nashville Outlaws were a collegiate summer baseball team of the Prospect League. They were located in Nashville, Tennessee, and were named for the city's association with country music, particularly the outlaw country genre which was popular during the late 1960s and 1970s. The team played its home games at Hawkins Field in 2010 and Ken Dugan Field at Stephen Lee Marsh Stadium in 2011. The Outlaws were established in 2010 as an expansion team of the Prospect League., but ceased operations after the 2011 season.

== Team history ==
The Nashville Outlaws began in 2010 in Nashville, Tennessee, as an expansion team of the collegiate summer baseball Prospect League. The franchise was founded by three former Nashville Sounds executives: Brandon Vonderharr, Jason Bennett, and Chris Snyder. The Outlaws are named for the city's association with country music, particularly the outlaw country genre which was popular during the late 1960s and 1970s.

The Outlaws played their first game, a 10–3 loss, against the Terre Haute Rex on the road at Sycamore Stadium in Terre Haute, Indiana, on June 4, 2010. After three more games on the road, the Outlaws played their first home game at Vanderbilt University's Hawkins Field on June 8. The home team defeated the Springfield Sliders by a score of 4–2. At the end of the first half of the season, the Outlaws were in third place in the Central Division with a 14–14 record. Three Nashville players were selected to play on the East Team in the 2010 Prospect League All-Star Game: pitchers Matt Fitton and Navery Moore and catcher Doug Joyce. The game was played to a 9-inning 3–3 tie.

Going into the next-to-last night of the season and scheduled for a doubleheader against Terre Haute, the Outlaws were tied with that team for first in the division. Nashville won both games and clinched the second-half pennant. The Outlaws finished the second half in first place with a record of 16 wins and 10 losses. They completed the season with an overall record of 30–24 (.556), good for second place in the division and fourth in the league. More importantly, their second-half win earned the team a spot in the league championship playoffs. However, Nashville was defeated by the Danville Dans in the first round, 4–2, eliminating them from the playoffs.

Four Nashville players were awarded accolades for their performance during the Outlaws' inaugural season. First baseman Kevin Smith was named to the Prospect League's First Team All-Star Team. Third baseman Greg Bachman, shortstop Sam Dove, and left-handed relief pitcher Matt Fitton were named to the Second Team All-Star Team.

For the 2011 season, the Outlaws had a new home, Lipscomb University's Ken Dugan Field at Stephen Lee Marsh Stadium, as well as new management in the form of general manager Luke Collier, and three new members of management: Jared Swantner, Charlyn Ursell, and Adam Boone. The team folded after the 2011 season.

== Notable players ==
Two Outlaws also played in Major League Baseball during their careers.

Shae Simmons, who played for Nashville in 2011, played for the Atlanta Braves in 2014 and 2016 and the Seattle Mariners in 2017.

Bruce Maxwell, of the 2011 Outlaws, played for the Oakland Athletics from 2016 to 2018. He also played for the Nashville Sounds, the city's Triple-A Minor League Baseball team, from 2016 to 2018.
