= Decatur Bean Ballers =

- Logo

Information
- League: Prospect League (Eastern Conference – Central Division)
- Location: Decatur, Illinois
- Ballpark: Workman Family Baseball Field
- Founded: 2026
- League championships: 0
- Division championships: 0
- Colors: Navy, light blue, light green, tan, white
- Ownership: Golden Rule Entertainment & Jamie Toole
- General manager: Jacob Watkins
- Manager: Gabe Arroyo
- Website: beanballers.com

The Decatur Bean Ballers are a collegiate summer league baseball team of the Prospect League. They are located in Decatur, Illinois, and play their home games at Workman Family Baseball Field. The Bean Ballers and other collegiate summer leagues and teams exist to give top college players a professional-like experience without affecting NCAA eligibility.

The Bean Ballers play in the Prospect League's Eastern Conference – Central Division along with the Danville Dans, Dubois County Bombers, Springfield Lucky Horseshoes, and Terre Haute Rex.

== History ==
Decatur's latest professional baseball team was the Decatur Commodores, a professional minor league Class A affiliate from its inception in 1900 to its folding in 1974. The Commodores served as a minor league affiliate to the Chicago Cubs, Cincinnati Reds, St. Louis Cardinals, Detroit Tigers, and San Francisco Giants during their existence as a franchise. However, after the 1974 season, the Commodores ended up relocating to Wausau, Wisconsin to become the Wausau Mets. Eventually, that same franchise would move to Geneva, Illinois, to become the Kane County Cougars. The relocation of the Commodores left the city of Decatur without a team.

After that, the city of Decatur had a franchise in the Central Illinois Collegiate League (CICL) called the Decatur Blues that played from the inception of the franchise in 1986 to its folding in 2003.

After over two decades without a ball club, on November 24, 2025, the Prospect League announced that a franchise had been awarded to the city of Decatur, with Golden Rule Entertainment and Jamie Toole as the owners of the team.

On February 17, 2026, the team was officially named the Bean Ballers.

== Stadium ==
The Bean Ballers play at Workman Family Baseball Field, a 459-seat facility owned and operated by Millikin University. The facility was built in 2019 and is located at 1271 W Decatur St in Decatur.

== Seasons ==
Season	Manager	Record	Win %	League	Division	GB	Post-season record	Post-season win %	Post-season result	Notes
2026	Gabe Arroyo	18–35	.340	18th	5th	12.5	0–0	.000	Did not qualify	Inaugural season
Totals		18–35	.340				0–0	.000		

== Roster ==
Decatur Bean Ballers roster
Active roster	Coaching staff
Pitchers: 9 Bruno Banuelos; 12 Adam Cooper; 33 Kaden Davis; 20 Max Gregory; 29 Willis McCarter; 11 David Mercer; 24 Baron Odam; 18 Parker Phillis; 22 Tyler Powell; 41 Jean Rodriguez; 3 Daniel Ruiz .; -- Noah Shapo; 13 Alex Tame; 35 Manuel Toro; 10 Nathan Trimble; 17 Patrick Kennedy; Catchers: 34 Oneill Feliz; 21 Jackson Miller; 2 Gage Reynolds; Infielders: 19 Garret Allen; 30 Caleb Crider; 1 Keegan Farnaus; -- Moises Febrillet; 23 Dane Hrasky; 28 Carder Reich; 27 Grayson Roberson; 25 Jackson Snitko; 17 Jagger Snitko; Outfielders: 16 Brandon Abernathy; 14 Trevor Geis; 26 Misael Maldonado; 15 Matthew Novominsky; 8 CJ Schoeffel; 37 Brandon Schultz	Manager: -- Gabe Arroyo; Coaches: -- Pete Romero (bench); -- John Toney (pitching); Disabled list; ‡ Inactive list; § Suspended list; updated June 5, 2026
