= Community Field =

Stadium in Burlington, Iowa

- "The Hive"
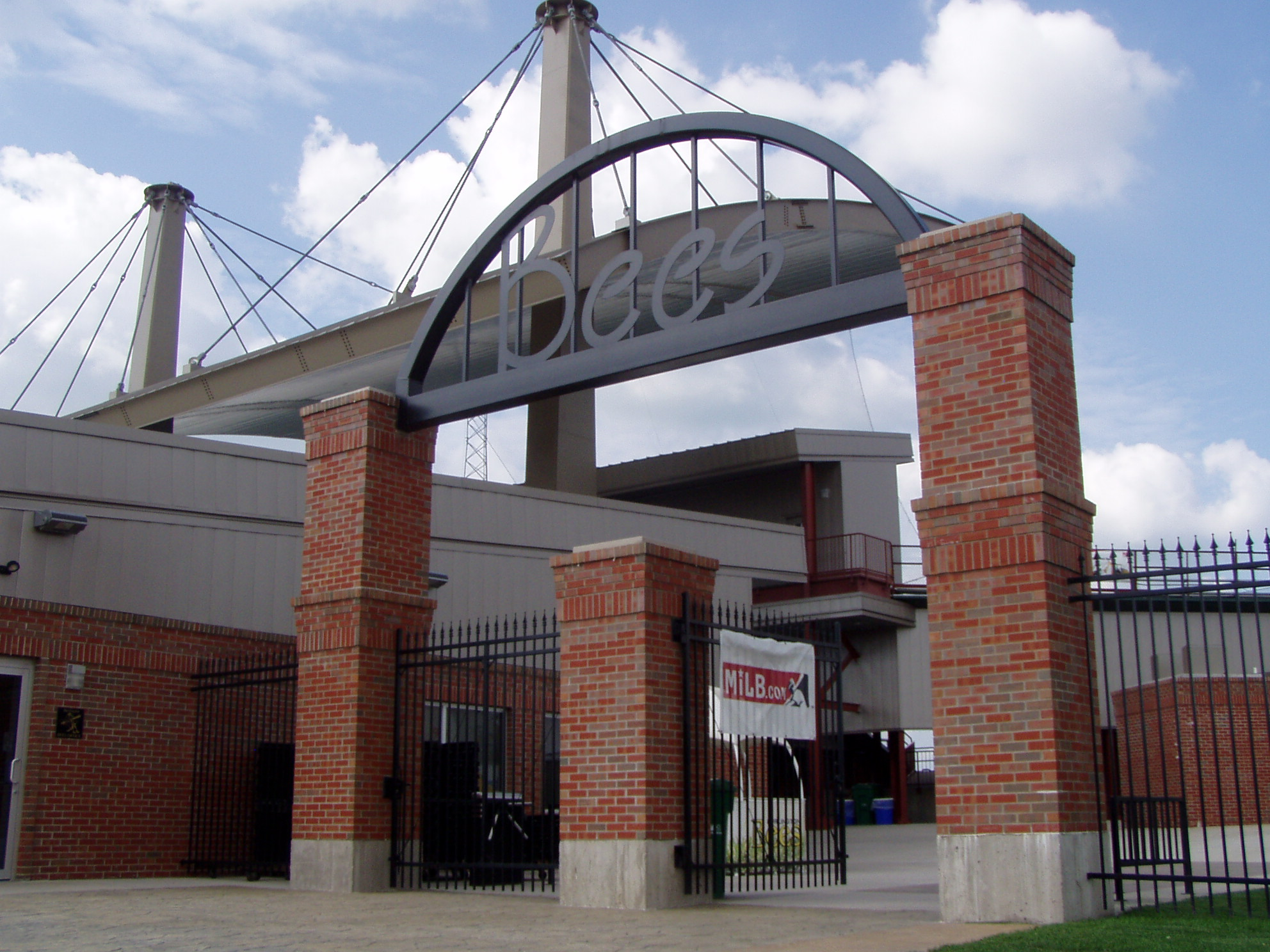
- Interactive map of Community Field
- Location: 2712 Mount Pleasant Street; Burlington, IA
- Coordinates: 40.827555°N 91.136903°W
- Owner: City of Burlington
- Operator: City of Burlington
- Capacity: 3,200
- Surface: Kentucky Bluegrass
- Field size: Left Field: 338 feet (103 m); Center Field: 403 feet (123 m); Right Field: 318 feet (97 m)

Construction
- Groundbreaking: 1947
- Opened: May 11, 1947
- Renovated: 1973, 1999, 2005
- Expanded: 2005
- Architect: Metzger Johnson Architects

Tenant
- Burlington Bees (MWL/PL) 1947–present

Community Field is a stadium in Burlington, Iowa. It is primarily used for baseball and is the home field of the Burlington Bees collegiate summer baseball team of the Prospect League. Occasionally, the stadium is used by the local high school baseball team. The current stadium holds 3,200 people. Community Field was most recently named the 2013 "Field of the Year" in the state of Iowa by the Iowa Sports Turf Management Association.

== History ==
Community Field was built in 1947 upon the establishment of the Burlington Indians, minor league baseball affiliate of the Cleveland Indians. During that time, Community Field housed the affiliates of five different minor league baseball clubs and was fortunate enough to see the likes of Billy Williams and Vida Blue perform before tragedy struck. On June 9, 1971, the grandstand seating burned down to the ground. However, during the rebuild, no games were missed as there were temporary bleacher seats erected in place of the grandstand. By the start of the 1973 season, the grandstand was finished by an all-volunteer crew, displaying impressive community support.

== Renovations ==
In 1999, a series of projects were started to improve Community Field and make it more fan-friendly. Such projects included:

- New bleacher seating and box seating
- Upgraded sound system
- Elevation of the Budweiser Party deck to provide a better view of the game.
- Addition to the maintenance shed to provide extra storage.
- Upgraded scoreboard with a message center in right-center field.

The stadium was once again renovated for the 2005 season, but this renovation was a much more extensive project than the renovations in 1999, including:

- A fully covered and expanded main concourse.
- A partial covering of the grandstand seating.
- A new press box and luxury suite, known as the Hall of Fame Suite, which can be rented out during games.
- Upgraded sound system
- A new scoreboard
- A new outer brick facade with wrought iron gates positioned at both entrances to stadium.
- A new separate building containing a new front office, board room, ticket office, kitchen, storage space and team store.

A final upgrade in 2006 included a partially paved parking lot, a new marquee sign on the edge of Mt. Pleasant St. and a 100-foot-tall flagpole (30 m) placed in the center of the parking lot, which holds a 40-foot-wide flag (12 m); the flag only flies when the Bees are playing at home. The "extreme makeover" of Community Field cost approximately $3 million and was funded by the Vision Iowa program, the City of Burlington, Des Moines County, corporate and private pledges and in-kind donations from contractors.

In October 2012, more improvements were made, when the Burlington Bees groundskeeping crew re-sodded the entire playing surface with assistance from the Iowa Cubs Sports Turf Management staff. A few months later, in late March 2013, Community Field installed new field lights, 2 of them being infield lights that were moved back, thus creating space for possible future expansion of the grandstands.

Community Field and the Burlington Bees rely heavily on community support from Burlington and the surrounding area communities. All of their renovations have been backed and supported by the community not only financially, but emotionally, as well.

== Friends of Community Field ==
The Friends of Community Field is a 501(c)(3) non-profit organization established in 1998 to help the Bees raise money for capital improvement projects involving Community Field. The Friends is run by a volunteer Board of Directors that helps to organize various fundraisers and the volunteer work force that helps maintain the stadium. Since 1998, money that has been raised has helped with new stadium lights, new playground flooring and canopy, new bleachers, box seats, the sound system, brat garden improvements and most recently, the fund raising for the "Extreme Makeover" of Community Field that was completed in 2005. In addition to the funds raised to finish the last renovation, the Friends of Community Field aims to raise money to start an endowment for future work to be done at the ballpark, without having to start another major fundraising initiative. All contributions to the Friends of Community Field are tax deductible.
