= Linda K. Epling Stadium =

West Virginian baseball field

Coordinates: 37°48′56″N 81°9′57″W

- Interactive map of Linda K. Epling Stadium
- Location: 200 Stadium Drive; Beckley, West Virginia 25801; United States
- Capacity: 2,500
- Scoreboard: Electronic

Construction
- Opened: 2010

Tenants
- West Virginia Miners (PL) (2010–2022); Marshall Thundering Herd (NCAA) (2010–2018) (select games); West Virginia Mountaineers (NCAA) (2013) (select games); WVU Tech Golden Bears (NAIA) (2017–present)

Linda K. Epling Stadium is a baseball field in Beckley, West Virginia. It opened in 2010. The field was built by the Epling family after it sold out its interests in the coal business. The stadium seats 2,500. It is used by the West Virginia Miners of the Prospect League and the WVU Tech Golden Bears. The facility has also been the home to select games of the Marshall University baseball team from 2010 to 2018, and was the home for select West Virginia University games in 2013

The stadium is about 40 miles (64 km) from the Donald M. Epling Stadium, WVU Tech's former baseball facility in Montgomery, which was also funded by the family.

== Events ==
Epling Stadium hosted the West Virginia Intercollegiate Athletic Conference baseball tournaments in 2011 and 2013.

It also hosted the Mountain East Conference baseball tournament annually from 2014 through 2022, except 2020 when most sporting events were cancelled due to the COVID-19 pandemic.

== See also ==
- List of NCAA Division I baseball venues
