= Gary McClure =

American baseball player and coach (born 1964)

Biographical details
- Born: July 2, 1964 (age 62); Keosauqua, Iowa, U.S.
- Education: Austin Peay, '87

Playing career
- 1983–1984: Southeastern CC (IA)
- 1985–1986: Cumberland
- Position: SS

Coaching career (HC unless noted)
- 1987: Austin Peay (asst.)
- 1988–2015: Austin Peay
- 2021: Burlington Bees
- 2025–present: Cape Catfish

Head coaching record
- Overall: 847–750–4

Accomplishments and honors

Championships
- OVC Regular season: 7 (1994, 1996, 2003, 2004, 2007, 2011, 2012); OVC Tournament: 6 (1996, 2005, 2007, 2011, 2012, 2013)

Awards
- Inducted into Austin Peay Athletic Hall of Fame (2012)

Records
- Austin Peay All Time Wins Leader (847); Ohio Valley Conference All Time Wins Leader (847); Most Ohio Valley Conference Games Won (363)

Gary McClure (born July 2, 1964) is an American former college baseball coach, formerly serving as head coach of the Austin Peay Governors baseball program. He was named to that position prior to the 1988 season. With 847 wins, McClure is the winningest coach in Austin Peay baseball history, as well as the winningest coach in Ohio Valley Conference baseball history.

McClure played two years at Southeastern Community College in Iowa before completing his eligibility at Cumberland. He then completed his degree at Austin Peay, and served as a student assistant coach. With the retirement of then-coach Billy Merkel, McClure was hired as head coach just two years removed from his playing days. Under McClure, the Governors won thirteen regular season and tournament OVC titles. They appeared in six NCAA Regionals. McClure has coached seven major league players Jamie Walker, George Sherrill, A. J. Ellis, Shawn Kelley, Matt Reynolds, Ryne Harper, and Tyler Rogers. McClure was inducted into the Austin Peay Athletic Hall of Fame in 2012. McClure has been a candidate for several major conference coaching vacancies, most recently at Iowa. He withdrew his name from consideration for the Iowa position in the summer of 2013, electing to remain at Austin Peay.

McClure was hired by the Battle Creek Bombers of the North Woods League in 2016 where his team finished with a record of 40-33 while going 21–16 in the second half. They made the playoffs for only the second time in the team's ten-year history. They beat the Madison Mallards in the first round and then lost in the semifinals to the Rapids Rafters, the eventual 2016 champion.

In 2017, McClure was hired by the Kokomo Jackrabbits. In 2019, he was hired as manager of the Milwaukee Milkmen for their inaugural 2019 season in the American Association of Independent Professional Baseball but was not retained for 2020 following the team's 38-62 performance. In 2021 McClure was hired as the Manager by the Burlington Bee's for its inaugural season in the Prospect League a collegiate summer Baseball league in Burlington Iowa. In 2024 McClure was hired as the manager by the Cape Catfish in Cape Girardeau Missouri in the Prospect League a collegiate summer Baseball league for its upcoming 2025 season. The Cape Catfish won the Prospect League Championship in McClure's first season.

== Head coaching record ==
This table shows McClure's record as a collegiate head coach.

Record table
Season	Team	Overall	Conference	Standing	Postseason
Austin Peay (Ohio Valley Conference) (1988–present)
1988	Austin Peay	23–27	10–12	3rd (South)	
1989	Austin Peay	32–25–1	10–7	3rd	OVC Tournament (Note: The top four finishers in the OVC qualified for the Tournament in 1989.)
1990	Austin Peay	31–25	6–8	4th	OVC Tournament (Note: The top four finishers in the OVC qualified for the Tournament in 1990)
1991	Austin Peay	15–37–1	6–11	5th	
1992	Austin Peay	29–28–1	14–7	2nd	OVC Tournament (Note: The top four finishers in the OVC qualified for the tournament in 1992.)
1993	Austin Peay	30–22	13–8	5th	
1994	Austin Peay	27–31	12–6	1st	OVC Tournament (Note: The top four finishers in the OVC qualified for the tournament in 1994.)
1995	Austin Peay	24–32	9–12	6th	
1996	Austin Peay	44–22	13–7	T-1st	NCAA Regional
1997	Austin Peay	28–31	14–10	3rd	OVC Tournament (Note: The top four finishers in the OVC qualified for the tournament in 1997.)
1998	Austin Peay	23–32	9–15	8th	
1999	Austin Peay	29–27	13–10	5th	
2000	Austin Peay	32–27	14–10	4th	OVC Tournament (Note: The top four finishers in the OVC qualified for the tournament in 2008.)
2001	Austin Peay	32–30	9–12	5th	OVC Tournament (Note: The top six finishers in the OVC qualified for the tournament in 2001.)
2002	Austin Peay	30–27	12–9	3rd	OVC Tournament (Note: The top six finishers in the OVC qualified for the tournament in 2002.)
2003	Austin Peay	27–27–1	14–5–1	1st	OVC Tournament (Note: The top six finishers in the OVC qualified for the tournament in 2003.)
2004	Austin Peay	35–21	20–7	1st	OVC Tournament (Note: The top six finishers in the OVC qualified for the tournament in 2004.)
2005	Austin Peay	38–24	16–11	2nd	NCAA Regional
2006	Austin Peay	32–27	14–13	5th	OVC Tournament (Note: The top six finishers in the OVC qualified for the tournament in 2006.)
2007	Austin Peay	40–22	19–8	1st	NCAA Regional
2008	Austin Peay	27–29	14–12	3rd	OVC Tournament (Note: The top six finishers in the OVC qualified for the tournament in 2008.)
2009	Austin Peay	22–30	7–12	9th	
2010	Austin Peay	28–25	8–13	7th	
2011	Austin Peay	34–24	17–8	1st	NCAA Regional
2012	Austin Peay	40–24	19–7	T-1st	NCAA Regional
2013	Austin Peay	47–15	22–7	2nd	NCAA Regional
2014	Austin Peay	23–33	14–16	T-7th	
2015	Austin Peay	25-26	15-15	7th	
Austin Peay:		847–750–4	363–292–1		
Total:		847–750–4			
National champion Postseason invitational champion Conference regular season champion Conference regular season and conference tournament champion Division regular season champion Division regular season and conference tournament champion Conference tournament champion

== See also ==
- List of current NCAA Division I baseball coaches
