= West Virginia Miners =

- Logo

Information
- League: Prospect League
- Location: Beckley, West Virginia
- Ballpark: Linda K. Epling Stadium
- Founded: 2010
- League championships: 3 (2012, 2013, 2016)
- Division championships: 5 (2011, 2012, 2013, 2015, 2016)
- Colors: Green, Gold, Black, Gray, White
- Ownership: Doug Epling
- General manager: Tim Epling
- Media: The Register-Herald, WMTD-FM
- Website: wvminersbaseball.com

The West Virginia Miners were a collegiate summer baseball team located in Beckley, West Virginia. The team began play in the Prospect League for the 2010 season. Home games are played at Linda K. Epling Stadium at the Upper Deck Training Center. It was announced in December 2022 that the Miners would not play in 2023, looking to return in 2024 in a different league. The Miners were not on the 2024 Prospect League schedule.

== Seasons ==
| Season | Manager | Record | Win % | League | Division | GB | Post-season record | Post-season win % | Post-season result | Notes |
|---|---|---|---|---|---|---|---|---|---|---|
| 2010 | Tim Epling | 26–30 | .464 | 10th | 2nd | 13.0 | 0–0 | .000 | Did not qualify | |
| 2011 | Tim Epling | 29–27 | .518 | 5th | 1st | – | 1–1 | .500 | Won East Division Championship (Slippery Rock); Lost Prospect League Championship (Quincy) | |
| 2012 | Tim Epling | 40–19 | .678 | 1st | 1st | – | 3–0 | 1.000 | Won East Division Championship (Chillicothe); Won Prospect League Championship (Dubois County) | |
| 2013 | Tim Epling | 38–22 | .633 | 2nd | 1st | – | 4–0 | 1.000 | Won East Division Championship (Chillicothe); Won Prospect League Championship (Quincy) | |
| 2014 | Tim Epling | 38–22 | .633 | 4th | 3rd | 2.0 | 0–0 | .000 | Did not qualify | |
| 2015 | Tim Epling | 35–24 | .593 | 3rd | 2nd | 2.5 | 2–3 | .400 | Won East Division Championship (Chillicothe); Lost Prospect League Championship (Terre Haute) | |
| 2016 | Tim Epling | 34–25 | .576 | 5th | 1st | – | 4–0 | 1.000 | Won East Division Championship (Kokomo); Won Prospect League Championship (Quincy) | |
| 2017 | Tim Epling | 30–28 | .517 | 4th | 2nd | 6.0 | 0–2 | .000 | Lost East Division Championship (Butler) | |
| 2018 | Tim Epling | 30–29 | .508 | 6th | 3rd | 7.0 | 0–0 | .000 | Did not qualify | |
| 2019 | Mike Syrett | 18–42 | .300 | 11th | 6th | 22.0 | 0–0 | .000 | Did not qualify | |
| 2020 | Season cancelled (COVID-19 pandemic) | | | | | | | | | |
| 2021 | Tim Epling | 23–36 | .390 | 15th | 4th | 12.5 | 0–0 | .000 | Did not qualify | |
| 2022 | Tim Epling | 20–37 | .351 | 15th | 4th | 16.5 | 0–0 | .000 | Did not qualify | |
| Totals | | 361–341 | .514 | | | | 14–6 | .700 | | |
