= Morgan Burkhart =

American baseball player and coach (born 1972)

- First baseman/Designated hitter
- Born: January 29, 1972 (age 54); St. Louis, Missouri, U.S.
- Batted: Switch Threw: Left

Professional debut
- MLB: June 27, 2000, for the Boston Red Sox
- NPB: March 30, 2002, for the Fukuoka Daiei Hawks

Last appearance
- NPB: June 2, 2002, for the Fukuoka Daiei Hawks
- MLB: July 2, 2003, for the Kansas City Royals

MLB statistics
- Batting average: .248
- Home runs: 5
- Runs batted in: 23

NPB statistics
- Batting average: .214
- Home runs: 9
- Runs batted in: 18
- Stats at Baseball Reference

Teams
- Boston Red Sox (2000–2001); Fukuoka Daiei Hawks (2002); Kansas City Royals (2003); As coach: San Diego Padres (2025)

Morgan Burkhart (born January 29, 1972) is an American former professional baseball first baseman/designated hitter in Major League Baseball (MLB) who played for the Boston Red Sox (2000–2001) and Kansas City Royals (2003). He was a switch hitter and threw left-handed. He is currently the batting practice and hitting instructor for the San Diego Padres.

Burkhart graduated from Hazelwood West High School in Hazelwood, Missouri.

Listed at 5 ft 11 in (1.80 m), 225 pounds, Burkhart was never able to fulfill the potential that he showed in the minor leagues. He started his professional career in 1995 as a pitcher/1B with the Richmond Roosters of the independent Frontier League. His numbers were significant, considering that during his time the league only had an 80-game schedule. In four seasons of Frontier ball, Burkhart hit .353 (393-for-1113), averaging 21.5 home runs and 76.5 RBI in each season. He won three league Most Valuable Player awards, was selected to the All-Star Game four times, and won the Triple Crown in 1998, hitting .404 with 36 home runs and 98 RBIs in 80 games, being honored by Baseball America as the 1998 Independent Player of the Year. He was dubbed by Peter Gammons as the "Babe Ruth of the Frontier League."

Burkhart was signed by the Boston Red Sox in 1998, playing for three different minor league levels before joining the Red Sox in June 2000. In his rookie season, he hit .288 with four home runs and 18 RBIs in 25 appearances, playing mostly as a backup for Brian Daubach. After the season, he made history in the Mexican Pacific League while playing for the Navojoa Mayos, when he homered from both sides of the plate in one game against Mazatlán. In 102 games, he hit .340 with 18 home runs and a .591 slugging percentage, including a 19-game hitting streak to start the season, and led the league with 55 RBIs and a .461 on-base percentage. Baseball America named him the Winter Player of the Year. From 1999 to 2000, he also was named the league MVP and a two-time All-Star.

Burkhart started 2001 with Triple-A Pawtucket, hitting .269 with 25 home runs and 65 RBIs in 120 games before rejoining the Red Sox late in the season. He spent 2002 with the Fukuoka Daiei Hawks of Japan's Pacific League, and played for the Kansas City Royals in 2003 for his last major league season.

In a 42-game Major League career, Burkhart posted a .248 batting average (30-for-121) with five home runs and 23 RBI, including a solid .366 on-base percentage.

After a brief stint in Triple-A with the 2004 Charlotte Knights, Burkhart went to the Mexican League with the Saraperos de Saltillo team based in Saltillo. He led the league in runs (100), walks (95) and OBP (.517), while hitting .365 (7th in the league) with 24 home runs (2nd), 91 RBIs (2nd), and a .658 slugging percentage. In 2005, he finished with a .304 average, 26 home runs, 72 RBI, 91 runs, 84 walks, a .466 OBP and a .583 SPC. The following season, he was sent by Saltillo to the Piratas de Campeche in exchange for Tom Evans.

Burkhart hit over 250 career home runs in total as a professional baseball player.

After his playing career ended he managed the Calgary Vipers from 2009 to 2011 before becoming the manager of the Windy City Thunderbolts for the 2012 season. He spent the next five seasons in the San Diego Padres organization, the last two of which at Triple-A El Paso.

While with the Fort Wayne TinCaps in the San Diego system, he coached Trea Turner, who was initially drafted by the Padres before being sent in a trade to the Washington Nationals. In an unusual situation, Turner was forced to remain in the San Diego system even after the trade had been agreed to, because Major League Baseball rules do not allow a player to be traded within a year of being drafted. As such, Turner was listed as a "player to be named later", although it was public knowledge that the player in question was in fact Turner. Turner's agent, Jeff Berry, told the media that it was an unfair process to force him to play half the season for a team that traded him and had no further interest in promoting his development, and said he would be filing a grievance through the players' union.

Looking back years later, Turner had nothing but praise for the Padres, particularly noting the time he remained while everyone waited for the trade to become official. Turner specifically mentioned Burkhart by name. "Even after I got traded, the staff I had, Morgan Burkhart, those guys worked with me and helped me as much as anybody. I remember not feeling like I was on the outside, even though I was being traded. I appreciated that. That’s something I’ll never forget.”

In 2026, Burkhart was named as the bench coach for the El Paso Chihuahuas the Triple-A affiliate of the San Diego Padres.
