= Kokomo Municipal Stadium =

Baseball stadium in Kokomo, Indiana, US

- Location within Indiana Kokomo Municipal Stadium (the United States)
- Interactive map of Kokomo Municipal Stadium
- Address: 400 S Union Street; Kokomo, Indiana, 46901 United States
- Coordinates: 40°28′58″N 86°07′42″W
- Capacity: 4,000
- Surface: Artificial turf

Construction
- Opened: May 31, 2015
- Cost: $9,000,000

Tenants
- Kokomo Jackrabbits (PL/NWL) 2015–2024; Kokomo Wildkats; Kokomo Mantis FC (PDL) 2016; Kokomo Creek Chubs (PL) 2026–present Indiana University Kokomo Cougars (NAIA)

Kokomo Municipal Stadium is a baseball stadium in Kokomo, Indiana, United States. The Kokomo Creek Chubs (founded in 2026) of the college summer Prospect League, and the Kokomo Wildkats (local high school) use Kokomo Municipal Stadium as their home field. The stadium was home to the Kokomo Jackrabbits from 2014 to 2024. Other local high school baseball teams including the Taylor Titans, Northwestern Tigers, and the Western Panthers use the Kokomo Municipal Stadium for a portion of their games. Upon opening in 2015, Kokomo Municipal Stadium had a capacity of up to 4,000 in a combination of fixed and lawn seating. In May 2016, the Kokomo Mantis FC of the Premier Development League called the stadium home.

== Facility ==
Kokomo Municipal Stadium has a capacity of 4,000 people in lawn and fixed seating. The Kokomo Municipal Stadium essentially replaces the CFD Investments Stadium that was once home to the minor league Kokomo Dodgers. The new stadium includes a suite level, concessions, restrooms, and locker rooms for both teams. The facility is specifically designed to host baseball games, but can also be converted for soccer, concerts or other events.

== Awards ==
In its inaugural season, Kokomo Municipal Stadium was named by Ballpark Digest as the 2015 Best Summer Collegiate Facility. In the final round of voting, fans chose KMS over Athletic Park of the Northwoods League's Wisconsin Woodchucks. Not to be outdone, in the summer of 2016, Kokomo Municipal Stadium repeated as Ballpark Digest's best 2016 Summer Collegiate Facility, once again outpacing Athletic Park.

== See also ==
- Kokomo Creek Chubs
- Kokomo Jackrabbits
- Northwoods League
