= Burlington Bees =

American collegiate summer baseball team

- Founded in 1924; Burlington, Iowa
Team logo
Cap insignia

Minor league affiliations
- Class: Collegiate summer (2021–present)
- Previous classes: Class A (1963–2020); Class D (1962); Class B (1952–1961); Class C (1947–1949)
- League: Prospect League (2021–present)
- Conference: Western Conference
- Division: Northwest Division
- Previous leagues: Midwest League (1962–2020); Three-I League (1952–1961); Central Association (1908–1916; 1947–1949); Mississippi Valley League (1924–1932); Iowa League of Professional Baseball Clubs (1904–1907); Western Association (1895, 1896–1898); Eastern Iowa League (1895); Illinois-Iowa League (1890); Central Interstate League (1889–1890)

Major league affiliations
- Team: Unaffiliated (2021–present)
- Previous teams: Los Angeles Angels (2013–2020); Oakland Athletics (2011–2012); Kansas City Royals (2001–2010); Chicago White Sox (1999–2000); Cincinnati Reds (1997–1998); San Francisco Giants (1995–1996); Montreal Expos (1993–1994); Houston Astros (1991–1992); Atlanta Braves (1988–1990); Montreal Expos (1986–1987); Texas Rangers (1982–1985); Milwaukee Brewers (1975–1981); Kansas City/Oakland A's (1963–1974); Pittsburgh Pirates (1960–1962); Chicago Cubs (1955–1959); Unaffiliated (1954); Cincinnati Reds (1952–1953); Cleveland Indians (1932, 1947–1949)

Minor league titles
- League titles (5): 1949; 1965; 1977; 1999; 2008
- Division titles (5): 1977; 1978; 1999; 2008; 2009

Team data
- Name: Burlington Bees (1924–1932, 1954–1981, 1993–present)
- Previous names: Burlington Astros (1991–1992); Burlington Braves (1988–1990); Burlington Expos (1986–1987); Burlington Rangers (1982–1985); Burlington Flints (1952–1953); Burlington Indians (1947–1949); Burlington Pathfinders (1906–1916); Burlington Flint Hills (1905); Burlington River Rats (1904); Burlington Hawkeyes (1890, 1898); Burlington Colts (1895–1897); Burlington Babies (1889)
- Mascot: Buzz
- Ballpark: Community Field (1947–present)
- Previous parks: Summer Street Park
- Owner/ Operator: City of Burlington, Iowa
- General manager: Jill Mason
- Manager: Owen Oreskovich
- Website: gobees.com/landing/index

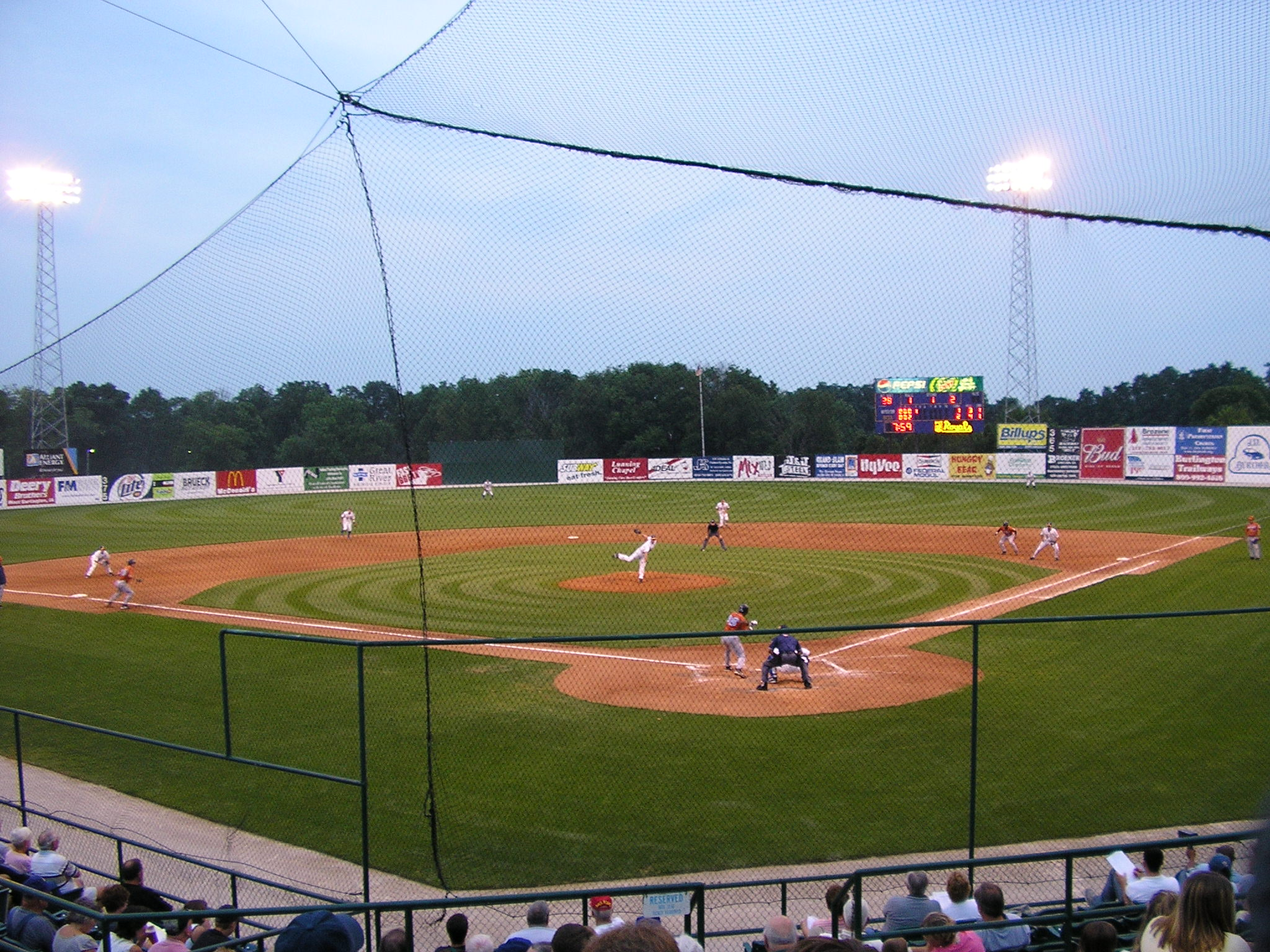
Burlington Community Field

The Burlington Bees are a collegiate summer baseball team of the Prospect League. They are located in Burlington, Iowa, and have played their home games at Community Field since 1947. Founded in 1889, the Bees played in Minor League Baseball's Midwest League from 1962 to 2020. With Major League Baseball's reorganization of the minor leagues after the 2020 season, Burlington was not selected to continue in affiliated baseball.

The team was first known as the "Bees" from 1924 to 1932 and again from 1954 to 1981. The Bees nickname was revived for the 1993 season and remains to this day.

Baseball Hall of Fame inductees Billy Williams, Paul Molitor and Larry Walker played for Burlington.

The Bees play in the Prospect League's Western Conference – Northwest Division along with the Clinton LumberKings, Illinois Valley Pistol Shrimp, Normal CornBelters, and Quincy Doggy Paddlers.

== History ==
The team began playing in Burlington in 1889 as the Burlington Babies. Teams with various nicknames played until the Burlington Pathfinders were named in 1906, keeping the nickname until 1916 and playing in the Central Association. After a hiatus, the Burlington Bees played in the Mississippi Valley League from 1924 to 1932. The franchise then returned as the Burlington Indians in 1947, the same year that their current stadium, Community Field, opened. They won the league championship in 1949, their third and final year in the Central Association. The team joined the Three-I (Illinois, Iowa, Indiana) League in 1952 as the Burlington Flints but was renamed the Bees in 1954. In 1958, Billy Williams played 61 games with the Bees before joining the Cubs. Burlington joined the Midwest League in 1962 as a farm team of the Pittsburgh Pirates. From 1963 through 1974 they were a farm team of the Kansas City (later Oakland) A's; subsequent affiliations included the Brewers (1975–81), Rangers (1982–85), Expos (1986–87 and 1993–94), Braves (1988–90), Astros (1991–92), Giants (1995–96), Reds (1997–98), and White Sox (1999–2000).

The Bees have won the Midwest League Championship four times, in four different decades: 1965 (won both halves), 1977 (defeated Waterloo Indians), 1999 (defeated Wisconsin Timber Rattlers) and 2008 (defeated South Bend Silver Hawks).

Catcher Herbert Whitney of the Burlington Pathfinders was killed by a pitched ball in 1906. On June 26 in Waterloo, Iowa, Whitney was beaned by a pitch from Fred Evans of the Waterloo Microbes. He suffered a skull fracture and died that day as a result.

The team was first known as the Bees from 1924 to 1932 and again from 1954 to 1981. Starting in 1982, they used the nickname of their major league parent club, before the current Bees nickname was revived for the 1993 season.

In addition to Baseball Hall of Famers Billy Williams, Paul Molitor and Larry Walker, many former Burlington players have enjoyed major league success including: Sal Bando, Vida Blue (who struck out a team-record 231 batters in 1968), George Hendrick, Phil Garner, Chet Lemon, Claudell Washington, Rubén Sierra, Kenny Rogers, José Vidro, Ugueth Urbina, Javy López, Mark Buehrle, Mike Moustakas, and Salvador Pérez. Over 100 former Bees have played in the majors.

In 2007, the Bees changed their logo and uniforms. Since 2000, the Bees have had three affiliates: the Kansas City Royals (2001–10), Oakland Athletics (2011–12), and the Los Angeles Angels (2013–2020).

Following the 2020 season, the Bees were cut from the Midwest League and affiliated baseball as part of Major League Baseball's reorganization of the minor leagues. They later joined the Prospect League, a collegiate summer baseball league, for 2021.

== Ballpark ==
The Bees have called historic Community Field, nicknamed "the hive", their home since 1947. The original grandstand portion of the stadium was destroyed in a 1971 fire and rebuilt. The stadium was upgraded again prior to the 2004 season, including a revamped concessions area, partial covering of the grandstand, improved sound system, and a new scoreboard. Named the 2013 "Field of the Year" in the state of Iowa by the Iowa Sports Turf Management Association, capital improvements are supported by The Friends of Community Field, a 501(c)(3) non-profit organization.

== No-hitters ==
Several Burlington pitchers have thrown no-hitters:

- 6-4-1962 Pedro Tio, Quad Cities 13–0 7 innings
- 8-14-1962 Charles Ling, Keokuk 6–0
- 5-6-1965 Don Pierce, Fox Cities 4–0
- 6-29-1965 George Bosworth, Cedar Rapids 3–0
- 6-19-1968 Vida Blue, Appleton 4–0 7 Innings
- 7-20-1975 Abelino Pena, Cedar Rapids 2–0 7 Innings (Perfect Game)
- 8-5-1996 Jason Grote Clinton 8–0
- 5-6-1998 Lance Davis/Dan Timm Quad City 5–0
- 8-5-2003 Jonah Bayliss Peoria 1–0
- 4-12-2004 Dusty Hughes/Jake Mullis Wisconsin 3–0
- 6-30-2004 Chris Coughlin Beloit 3–0 Perfect game
- 8-7-2008 Danny Duffy/Juan Abreu Peoria 10–0

== Roster ==
Burlington Bees Roster
Active Roster	Coaching Staff
Pitchers: 34 Will Baumhardt; 35 Norm Cherrett; 18 Mitchell Cox; 16 Jack Cozzi; 22 Riley Fuller; 46 Patrick Geary; 36 TJ Hauser; 29 Quintin Holmes; 40 Talon Jennings; 41 Adam Kudronowicz; 50 Kade LaCoste; -- Bryce Loker; 4 Ty Mikkelsen; 27 Jaylan Patterson; 26 Kyle Prebil; 19 Ramzy Rodriguez; 51 Edwin Sanchez; 12 Kole Sonnenburg; 31 Spencer Spinks; 44 Aidan Torronez; 45 Zach Troxel; 8 Jake Weissenberger; 32 Quinn Wilfong; Utility Players: 2 Kolt Kurzman; Catchers: 23 Johnnie Ankenbruck; 48 PJ Hamel; 11 Milo Kelley; Infielders: 14 Rowen Bergeron; 5 Juan Fernandez; 15 Gage Handzel; 6 Lucas Krebs; 39 Austin Mallee; 21 Dalton Miller; 9 Tate Slagle; 7 Kila Teixeira; Outfielders: 24 Jace Figuereo; 28 Troy Peltz; 33 Tanner Reinartz; 3 Foti Rigopoulos; 25 Matthew Simmons	Manager: -- Owen Oreskovich; Coaches: -- Aric Beaman (assistant); -- Tyler Nagelbach (assistant); Disabled list; ‡ Inactive list; >§ Suspended list; updated June 5, 2026

== Notable alumni ==
=== Baseball Hall of Fame alumni ===
- Larry Walker (1986) Inducted, 2020
- Paul Molitor (1977) Inducted, 2004
- Billy Williams (1958) Inducted, 1987

=== Notable alumni ===
- Jared Walsh (2016) MLB All-Star
- Max Muncy (2012) MLB All-Star
- Addison Russell (2012) MLB All-Star
- Zack Thornton (2011)
- Salvador Pérez (2009) 3 x GG; 3 X MLB All-Star
- Eric Hosmer (2009)
- Mike Moustakas (2008) MLB All-Star
- Mark Buehrle (1999) 4 x GG; 5 x MLB All-Star
- Shawn Estes (1995) MLB All-Star
- Jose Vidro (1993) 3 x MLB All-Star
- Ugueth Urbina (1993) 2 x MLB All-Star: 1999 NL Saves Leader
- Carlos Perez (1993) MLB All-Star
- Javy López (1990) 3 x MLB All-Star
- Mike Mordecai (1989)
- Mike Stanton (1988) MLB All-Star
- Kent Bottenfield (1987) MLB All-Star
- Mel Rojas (1987) MLB All-Star
- Chad Kreuter (1985)
- Mike Stanley (1985) MLB All-Star
- Kenny Rogers (1984) 5 x GG; 4 x MLB All-Star
- Rubén Sierra (1984) 4 x MLB All-Star; 1989 AL RBI Leader
- Randy Ready (1981)
- Bob McClure (1981)
- Doug Jones (1979) 5 x MLB All-Star
- Moose Haas (1975)
- Dwayne Murphy (1974)
- Matt Keough (1974) MLB All-Star
- Wayne Gross (1973–74) MLB All-Star
- Chet Lemon (1973–74) 3 x MLB All-Star
- Mike Norris (1973) 2 x GG; MLB All-Star
- Claudell Washington (1973) 3 x MLB All-Star
- Dan Ford (1971–72)
- Phil Garner (1971) 3 x MLB All-Star
- Glenn Abbott (1971)
- George Hendrick (1968, 1970) 4 x MLB All-Star
- Vida Blue (1968) 6 x MLB All-Star; 1971 AL Cy Young Award; 1971 AL Most Valuable Player
- Sal Bando (1965) 4 x MLB All-Star
- Gene Alley (1960) 2 x GG; 2 x MLB All-Star
- Jim Brewer (1958) MLB All-Star
- George Altman (1957)
- Dave Stenhouse (1956) MLB All-Star
- Johnny Vander Meer (1953 Player/MGR)
- Lloyd Brown (1949)
- Hal Trosky (1932) 1936 AL RBI Leader (162)

== Players (1947–present) ==
- Burlington Indians (1947–49)
- Burlington Flints (1952–53)
- Burlington Bees (1954–81)
- Burlington Rangers (1982–85)
- Burlington Expos (1986–87)
- Burlington Braves (1988–90)
- Burlington Astros (1991–92)
- Burlington Bees (1993–present)

== Sources ==
- Dinda, J. (2003), "Burlington, Iowa, in the Midwest League," Burlington, Iowa in the Midwest League | MWLguide.com
