= Dubois County Bombers =

- Logo

Information
- League: Prospect League (2009–2012, 2024–present) (Eastern Conference – Central Division)
- Location: Huntingburg, Indiana
- Ballpark: League Stadium
- Founded: 1998
- League championships: 5 (2004, 2007, 2015, 2017, 2021)
- Division championships: 9 (2000, 2001, 2002, 2003, 2012, 2017, 2019, 2021, 2022)
- Former name: Bluff City Bombers (1998–2004)
- Former league(s): Central Illinois Collegiate League (1998–2008); Ohio Valley League (2013–2023)
- Former ballpark: Lloyd Hopkins Field (1998–2004)
- Colors: Red, navy, white
- Ownership: Justin Knepp, Ara Knepp & Barton Lewis
- General manager: Maddy Elmer & Mark Peters
- Manager: Travis LaMar
- Website: www.dcbombers.com

The Dubois County Bombers are a collegiate summer league baseball team of the Prospect League. They are located in Huntingburg, Indiana, and play their home games at League Stadium. The Bombers and other collegiate summer leagues and teams exist to give top college players a professional-like experience without affecting NCAA eligibility.

The Bombers play in the Prospect League's Eastern Conference – Central Division along with the Danville Dans, Decatur Bean Ballers, Springfield Lucky Horseshoes, and Terre Haute Rex.

== History ==
The Bombers franchise began in 1998 in the city of Alton, Illinois, where they were named the Bluff City Bombers. The Bombers played in the Central Illinois Collegiate League (CICL) with their home games, at the time, being played at Lloyd Hopkins Field, which eventually became the home of the Alton River Dragons of the Prospect League.

After the 2004 season, the franchise relocated to Huntingburg, Indiana, where they would play their future home games at League Stadium. The team remained a member of the CICL until the league ceased operations and became the Prospect League in 2009.

It would be announced after the conclusion of the 2012 season that the Bombers would leave the Prospect League for the Ohio Valley League, another collegiate summer baseball league, where they would be a member from 2013 to 2023.

On September 20, 2023, the Bombers officially announced their return to the Prospect League for the 2024 season and beyond.

== Stadium ==
The Bombers play at League Stadium, a 3,300-seat facility owned and operated by the city of Huntingburg, Indiana. The facility was built in 1894, renovated in 1991, and is located at 203 S Cherry St in Huntingburg.

== Seasons ==
Dubois County Bombers of the Prospect League
Season	Manager	Record	Win %	League	Division	GB	Post-season record	Post-season win %	Post-season result	Notes
2009	Brian Smiley	25–28	.472	8th	4th	9.5	0–0	.000	Did not qualify	First season in Prospect League
2010	Brian Smiley	21–33	.389	T–12th	5th	10.0	0–0	.000	Did not qualify	
2011	Grant Bellak	22–31	.415	T–13th	T–7th	14.5	0–0	.000	Did not qualify	
2012	Ryan Anderson	36–24	.600	T–3rd	2nd	2.0	1–2	.333	Won West Division Championship (Terre Haute); Lost Prospect League Championship (West Virginia)	Last season in Prospect League until 2024
Dubois County Bombers of the Ohio Valley League
Season	Manager	Record	Win %	League	Division	GB	Post-season record	Post-season win %	Post-season result	Notes
2013	Wes Fink	22–23	.489	4th	–	11.0	0–1	.000	Lost Quarterfinals (Owensboro)	First season in Ohio Valley League
2014	Wes Fink	19–20	.488	4th	–	7.5	0–1	.000	Lost Quarterfinals (Madisonville)	
2015	Andy Lasher	26–14	.650	1st	–	–	4–2	.667	Won Semifinals (Hoptown); Won Ohio Valley League Championship (Madisonville)	
2016	Andy Lasher	26–15	.634	3rd	–	6.5	1–0	1.000	Won Quarterfinals (Paducah) (Note: Playoffs were cancelled due to severe weather during the Semifinals)	
2017	Andy Lasher	29–11	.725	1st	1st	–	6–1	.857	Won Quarterfinals (Fulton); Won East Division Championship (Paducah); Won Ohio Valley League Championship (Hoptown)	
2018	Andy Lasher	25–16	.610	2nd	2nd	2.5	2–3	.400	Won Quarterfinals (Henderson); Lost East Division Championship (Owensboro)	
2019	Travis LaMar	20–18	.526	T–4th	3rd	4.5	4–2	.667	Won Quarterfinals (Owensboro); Won East Division Championship (Henderson); Lost Ohio Valley League Championship (Hoptown)	
2020	Season cancelled (COVID-19 pandemic)									
2021	Travis LaMar	26–18	.591	4th	2nd	0.5	6–0	1.000	Won Quarterfinals (Owensboro); Won North Division Championship (Henderson); Won Ohio Valley League Championship (Full Count)	
2022	Travis LaMar	25–22	.538	4th	2nd	9.5	4–3	.571	Won Quarterfinals (Madisonville); Won North Division Championship (Henderson); Lost Ohio Valley League Championship (Full Count)	
2023	Travis LaMar	21–17	.553	5th	–	8.0	0–2	.000	Lost Quarterfinals (Louisville)	Final season in the Ohio Valley League
Dubois County Bombers of the Prospect League
Season	Manager	Record	Win %	League	Division	GB	Post-season record	Post-season win %	Post-season result	Notes
2024	Travis LaMar	19–35	.352	16th	5th	12.5	0–0	.000	Did not qualify	Returned to the Prospect League
2025	Travis LaMar	21–30	.412	14th	3rd	13.0	0–0	.000	Did not qualify	
2026	Travis LaMar	26–30	.464	15th	3rd	6.0	0–1	.000	Lost Central Division Championship (Terre Haute)	
Totals		409–385	.515				28–18	.609		

== Roster ==
Dubois County Bombers roster
Active roster	Coaching staff
Pitchers: 35 Austin Balog; 57 Hayden Christman; 25 Zach Dellerman; 22 Isaac Duty; 37 Trevor Fishman; -- Ian Hall; 24 Bryce Haney; 38 Brandon Hoffmann; -- Luke Holbrook; 26 Jaxson Howard; 39 Ryan Lambert; 32 Raygan New; 10 Andrew Noblitt; 20 Gibson Pauley; 29 James Ross; -- Isaac Waggner; 27 Clayton Weisheit; -- Caiden White; Catchers: 6 Drew Bradley; 9 John DiGregorio; 8 Hunter Reeb; Infielders: 7 Hudson Allen; 23 Owen Cornett; 5 Drake DeFreitas; 15 Simon Gaines; 21 Aiden McClary; 1 Dixon Monk; 30 Nate Ozuna; 11 Simon Schulz; Outfielders: 18 Ian Cartwright; 4 Nate Dunfee; 12 Brayden Giesler; 2 Jack Gordon; 16 Mayes Gosser; 13 Garrett Schmidt	Manager: -- Travis LaMar; Coaches: -- Mike Fowler (assistant); -- Logan Marx (pitching); -- Jake Stuteville (assistant); Disabled list; ‡ Inactive list; § Suspended list; updated June 5, 2026
