= Kokomo Jackrabbits =

College summer baseball team based in Kokomo, Indiana

- Logo

Information
- League: Northwoods League (2019–2024) (Great Lakes Division – East)
- Location: Kokomo, Indiana
- Ballpark: Kokomo Municipal Stadium
- Founded: 2014
- Folded: 2025
- League championships: 0
- Division championships: 1 (2018)
- Former league: Prospect League (2014–2018)
- Colors: Brown, orange, yellow, white, gray
- Ownership: Michael Zimmerman
- Management: Roc Ventures
- General manager: Nathan Martin

Current uniforms
Home	Away

The Kokomo Jackrabbits were a collegiate summer league baseball team of the Northwoods League. They were based in Kokomo, Indiana and played their home games at Kokomo Municipal Stadium. Before joining the Northwoods League, the Jackrabbits played in the Prospect League.

The Jackrabbits dissolved after the 2024 season due to a legal battle between the city of Kokomo and the ownership of the Jackrabbits, Kokomo Baseball LLC, which ultimately ended with a judge ruling in favor of the city of Kokomo. The ruling officially brought an end to the Jackrabbits.

== Namesake ==
Kokomo's baseball team went through a naming contest in the summer of 2014 before landing on the winning name of "Jackrabbits." Of around 1,000 entries in the online naming campaign, 15 people suggested the name "Jackrabbit" for Kokomo's Prospect League team. The name is the same as a popular automobile developed by the Apperson Brothers in a building adjacent to where Kokomo Municipal Stadium now stands.

== Colors & uniform ==
The Kokomo Jackrabbits have adopted a look that is reminiscent of the San Diego Padres uniforms during the 1970s and 1980s with brown, mustard and orange colors.

== Seasons ==
Kokomo Jackrabbits of the Prospect League
Season	Manager	Record	Win %	League	Division	GB	Post-season record	Post-season win %	Post-season result	Notes
2015	Greg Van Horn	30–30	.500	6th	3rd	13.0	0–0	.000	Did not qualify	Inaugural season
2016	Matt Howard	31–29	.517	7th	2nd	3.5	0–2	.000	Lost East Division Championship (West Virginia)	
2017	Gary McClure	27–33	.450	8th	5th	10.0	0–0	.000	Did not qualify	
2018	Gary McClure	37–22	.627	1st	1st	–	2–3	.400	Won East Division Championship (Chillicothe); Lost Prospect League Championship (Terre Haute)	
Kokomo Jackrabbits of the Northwoods League
Season	Manager	Record	Win %	League	Division	GB	Post-season record	Post-season win %	Post-season result	Notes
2019	Hayden Carter	29–42	.408	20th	5th	22.5	0–0	.000	Did not qualify	First season in the Northwoods League
2020	Season cancelled (COVID-19 pandemic)									
2021	Hayden Carter	45–27	.625	4th	1st	–	1–2	.333	Lost Great Lakes East Division Championship (Traverse City)	
2022	Michael Lieberman / Colton Hann	19–52	.268	20th	6th	25.5	0–0	.000	Did not qualify	
2023	Johnston Hobbs	27–45	.375	21st	5th	20.0	0–0	.000	Did not qualify	
2024	Johnston Hobbs	22–50	.306	25th	7th	25.0	0–0	.000	Did not qualify	Final season
Totals		267–330	.447				3–7	.300		

== Coaches ==
On October 20, 2014, Greg Van Horn was named the first Field Manager in Jackrabbits history. After a tumultuous first thirty games to the 2015 season (in which he was ejected three times), Van Horn was relieved of his duties by Matt Howard, who remained in place for the 2016 season.

Howard lead the Jackrabbits to a 46–45 record across his one and a half seasons. Howard then moved on to accept the same position at Indiana University Kokomo, where he became the baseball team's first field manager in school history.

The Jackrabbits then hired former Austin Peay coach and all time Ohio Valley Conference wins leader Gary McClure. McClure posted a 64–55 (.538) record in his two seasons with the club. After leading the team to the Prospect League Championship Series in the 2018 season, it was announced that McClure would be taking over as the first manager of the American Association of Independent Professional Baseball expansion team, the Milwaukee Milkmen (also owned by the Jackrabbits' parent company, ROC Ventures).

In 2022 Johnston Hobbs was hired by Nathan Martin, the general manager. Martin won general manager of the year for Indiana Northwoods League teams.

== Jackrabbits drafted by MLB teams ==
Kokomo Jackrabbits in MLB Draft
Year	Player	Position	College	Drafting Team	Round
2021	**Denzel Clarke**	Outfielder	California State University, Northridge	Oakland Athletics	4th round
2021	Evan Elliott	Pitcher	Lethbridge Community College	Texas Rangers	15th round
2022	**Chase Meidroth**	Infielder	University of San Diego	Boston Red Sox	4th round
2022	**Jakob Marsee**	Outfielder	Central Michigan University	San Diego Padres	6th round
2022	Adam Crampton	Infielder	Stanford University	Baltimore Orioles	9th round
2022	Chris Santiago	Infielder/Pitcher	Saint Mary's College of California	New York Mets	18th round
2023	T. J. Fondtain	Pitcher	San Diego State University	Tampa Bay Rays	14th round
2023	Rio Britton	Pitcher	North Carolina State University	Arizona Diamondbacks	15th round
2023	Hector Garcia	Pitcher	Hope International University	Minnesota Twins	18th round
2023	Bayden Root	Pitcher	Oklahoma State University	Milwaukee Brewers	Undrafted free agent
2024	Michael Snyder	Infielder	University of Oklahoma	Miami Marlins	10th round
2024	Jon Jon Gazdar	Infielder	Austin Peay State University	St. Louis Cardinals	11th round
2025	Payton Graham	Pitcher	Gonzaga University	St. Louis Cardinals	7th round
2025	Jack Moroknek	Outfielder	Butler University	Washington Nationals	11th round

Bold indicates that player has made their MLB debut.
