= Richmond Roosters =

Defunct professional baseball team in Richmond, Indiana

- 1995–2005; Richmond, Indiana

Minor league affiliations
- Class: Independent
- League: Frontier League
- Division: East Division (1999-2005); West Division (1996–1998)

Minor league titles
- League titles (2): 2001; 2002
- Division titles (1): 1996

Team data
- Name: Richmond Roosters
- Colors: Green, orange, white, black, yellow
- Ballpark: Don McBride Stadium

The Richmond Roosters were a professional baseball team based in Richmond, Indiana from 1995 to 2005. The Roosters played in the independent Frontier League, which at that time had no affiliation with Major League Baseball.

The Roosters began play in the third season of the Frontier League when the Kentucky Rifles franchise folded and Richmond was granted an expansion team. The team played at Don McBride Stadium in Richmond. The franchise was sold after the 2005 season, moved to Traverse City, Michigan and became the Traverse City Beach Bums.

== History ==
The Richmond Roosters returned professional baseball to Richmond, Indiana in 1995, with the last professional team being the Class D Richmond Tigers of the Ohio-Indiana League, a Detroit Tigers affiliate, which folded in 1951. The team played at Municipal Stadium, which is now known as Don McBride Stadium.

The Roosters were led in the 1995 season by Morgan Burkhart, who would become the second Frontier League player to make a Major League Baseball team when he joined the Boston Red Sox in 2000. Brian Tollberg of the Chillicothe Paints was the first league alumnus to make the majors, beating Burkhart by a week in the 2000 season. Burkhart won three league Frontier League MVP awards (1995–1997) and the league MVP award is now named after him. On June 8, 1997, Roosters pitcher Christian Hess threw the first no-hitter in Frontier League history, defeating the Kalamazoo Kodiaks 9–0 in Kalamazoo.

Richmond won back-to-back Frontier League championships in 2001 and 2002, led by player-manager Fran Riordan. In 2001, the Roosters upset the league-best Paints 2–0 in the best-of-three championship series to capture their first Frontier League title. The team was led by pitcher Steve Carver (10–3, 3.91 ERA), closer Mike Ziroli (1–1, 2.58 ERA, 16 saves), 1B Riordan (.299 BA, 14 HR, 74 RBI) and C-1B Steve Mitrovich (.304 BA, 12 HR, 65 RBI). The team repeated as Frontier League champions in 2002, again upsetting the league-best Washington Wild Things 3–1 in a best of five series for the title. The Roosters were led in 2002 by pitchers Enriques Baca (10–4, 2.87 ERA) and Matt Schweitzer (8–2, 4.29 ERA), Fran Riordan (.314 BA, 11 HR, 81 RBI), and league MVP OF Phil Willingham (.360 BA, 15 HR, 86 RBI, 36 SB).

Growth in the Frontier League challenged the small Richmond franchise and the ownership group elected to sell the franchise at the conclusion of the 2005 season. The last home game for the Roosters was a 9–3 loss to the Evansville Otters on September 2, 2005, and the team finished the season on the road with the last Richmond game being a 9–8 road loss to the Florence Freedom on September 5, 2005.

In 2005, the Roosters were purchased and the franchise moved to Traverse City, Michigan for the 2006 Frontier League season, playing at Wuerfel Park as the Traverse City Beach Bums.

The Roosters are represented in the Frontier League Hall of Fame by Richmond player-manager Fran Riordan, Richmond part-owner Duke Ward, along with Roosters first-basemen Morgan Burkhart, pitcher Matt Schweitzer, outfielder Pete Pirman, and pitcher Bobby Chandler.

== Season-by-season records ==
Richmond Roosters
Year	W-L	PCT	Place	Postseason
1995	38–32	.543	4th in FL	
1996	39–35	.527	1st in FL West	League Division Series: Lost vs. Springfield Capitals 2–1
1997	43–37	.538	2nd in FL West	League Division Series: Lost vs. Evansville Otters 2–1
1998	49–31	.612	2nd in FL West	
1999	40–43	.482	4th in FL East	
2000	40–43	.482	4th in FL East	
2001	49–35	.583	2nd in FL East	League Division Series: Defeated the Dubois County Dragons 2–1; Frontier League Championship Series: Defeated the Chillicothe Paints 2–0; Frontier League Champions
2002	53–31	.631	2nd in FL East	League Division Series: Defeated the Dubois County Dragons 2–1; Frontier League Championship Series: Defeated the Washington Wild Things 3–1; Frontier League Champions
2003	50–39	.562	4th in FL East	
2004	43–53	.448	5th in FL East	
2005	39–56	.415	6th in FL East	
Totals	483–435	.526		
Playoffs	12–7	.632		1 Division Title, 4 Playoff Appearances, 2 Championships
