= Prospect League =

United States collegiate summer baseball league

- Current season, competition or edition: 2026 Prospect League season
- Formerly: CICL
- Sport: Baseball
- Founded: 1963
- First season: 2009
- Commissioner: David Brauer
- No. of teams: 20
- Country: USA
- Headquarters: Illinois
- Most recent champion: Cape Catfish (2025)
- Most titles: Chillicothe Paints (4)
- Streaming partner: HomeTeam Network
- Website: prospectleague.com/landing/index

The Prospect League is a collegiate summer baseball league comprising teams of college players from North America and beyond. All players in the league must have NCAA eligibility remaining in order to participate. So as to maintain their college eligibility, players are not paid. Beginning in 2026, the league dropped four games from the season, making a total of 56 games per team (28 home and 28 road).

== League history ==
=== Origin ===
In 1963, the Central Illinois Collegiate League (CICL), the precursor league to the Prospect League, was formed as a charter member of the National Collegiate Athletic Association (NCAA) summer collegiate baseball program. The league existed under NCAA rules and guidance for 41 years. In 2005, the NCAA ended its official association with summer collegiate baseball; however, the CICL continued to preserve the amateur status of its member athletes by abiding by the rules and regulations of the National Alliance of College Summer Baseball (NACSB). In 2009, the CICL planned to expand to six teams by adding the Hannibal Cavemen, but in winter 2008, the league ownership voted against further expansion.

Dr. Chris Hanners, owner of the Chillicothe franchise and one of the founders of the independent professional Frontier League, wanted to keep a Paints baseball team in Chillicothe. Dr. Hanners, Leo Trich, former Frontier league director of development; General Manager and majority owner of the Butler BlueSox, and Duke Ward, former owner of the Frontier League's Richmond Roosters worked with the ownership of the CICL to form the Prospect League.

The Prospect League began its inaugural season in summer 2009 with the original CICL teams forming the Western Division. Five expansion teams formed the Eastern Division. Three of the Eastern Division teams began play in markets previously served by Frontier League teams. Besides the Chillicothe Paints, the Richmond RiverRats (Richmond, Indiana) played in the previous home of the Frontier League's Richmond Roosters, which are now the Traverse City Beach Bums. The Slippery Rock Sliders (Slippery Rock, Pennsylvania) played in the previous home of the Frontier League team of the same name.

=== 2010 expansion ===
In 2010, the Prospect League expanded adding four new franchises: the Terre Haute Rex (Terre Haute, Indiana), the West Virginia Miners (Beckley, West Virginia), the DeKalb County Liners (Sycamore, Illinois), and the Nashville Outlaws (Nashville, Tennessee).

Due to a change in team ownership in 2010, the North Coast Knights became the Lorain County Ironmen.

=== 2011 and 2012 team departures ===
In 2011 the DuPage Dragons franchise folded after five years with the CICL (2006–08) and Prospect League (2009–10). As a result, the league returned to a 2-division format after having 3 divisions in 2010. Richmond was moved to the six-team Eastern Division, while Danville, Nashville, Terre Haute, and Dubois County were moved to the eight-team Western Division.

Before the 2012 season, the Nashville Outlaws folded, and the DeKalb County Liners left the league to join the Midwest Collegiate League, leaving the Prospect League with twelve teams in two, six-team divisions. The 2012 schedule consisted of 60 games with no "cross-over" games; with all games played among teams from the same division only. The only time teams from opposite divisions meet is in the Championship Series.

=== Expansion into New York ===
For the 2015 season, the league added its easternmost team yet, the Jamestown Jammers (Jamestown, New York). The Kokomo Jackrabbits (Kokomo, Indiana) were also added to the league to play in the new Kokomo Municipal Stadium, set to open for the 2015 season. After the 2015 season, the Richmond RiverRats folded, and the Jamestown Jammers moved to the Perfect Game Collegiate Baseball League after just one season in the Prospect League.

=== Lafayette and DuPage join the league ===
The league stayed at 12 total teams for the 2016 season by adding the new Lafayette Aviators (Lafayette, Indiana) and DuPage Drones (Lisle, Illinois).

=== 2017 contraction ===
For the 2017 season, the league contracted to 10 teams, as the Hannibal Cavemen and DuPage Drones both ceased operation. Hannibal reentered the league for the 2018 season as the Hannibal Hoots.

=== 2019 expansion and reorganization ===
The league returned to a twelve team league for the 2019 season with the addition of the Cape Catfish in Cape Girardeau, Missouri, the departure of the Kokomo Jackrabbits to the Northwoods League, the addition of the Normal CornBelters from the Frontier League and the addition of the DuPage Pistol Shrimp in Lisle, Illinois.

The 2019 league featured two divisions, each with six teams. The West Division consisted of the Cape Catfish, DuPage Pistol Shrimp, Hannibal Hoots, Normal CornBelters, Quincy Gems and the Springfield Sliders. The East Division consisted of the Champion City Kings, Chillicothe Paints, Danville Dans, Lafayette Aviators, Terre Haute REX and the West Virginia Miners.

=== 2020 season cancellation ===
On May 29, 2020, the Prospect League announced cancellation of the 2020 season due to the COVID-19 pandemic. In January 2020, the league announced adding a new team in Alton, Illinois for the 2021 season. In September 2020, the league announced adding a new team in Johnstown, Pennsylvania for the 2021 season.

=== 2021 expansion ===
In February 2021, the league announced the addition of two new teams in Iowa, the Clinton LumberKings and Burlington Bees. Both teams are former Midwest League teams displaced in the 2021 realignment of the minor leagues.

=== 2023 expansion ===
In December 2021, the league announced the addition of the Jackson Rockabillys for the 2023 season, playing home games in Jackson, Tennessee at West Tennessee Baseball Stadium (formerly known as The Ballpark at Jackson). In August 2022, the league announced that a Southern Illinois team would begin play in 2023 at Rent One Park in Marion, Illinois; in February 2023, the team was named the Thrillville Thrillbillies. The league announced that the West Virginia Miners would be dormant for the 2023 season.

=== 2024 expansion ===
In September 2023, the Dubois County Bombers announced they will rejoin the Prospect League for the 2024 season playing their home games at the historic League Stadium.

== Members ==
=== Current members ===
Northeast Division
Central Division
Northwest Division
South Division

Eastern Conference
Division	Team	Founded	Joined	Stadium	City	Capacity
Northeast	Champion City Half Trax	2009	2013	Carleton Davidson Stadium	Springfield, Ohio	1,077
Northeast	Chillicothe Paints*	1993	2009	V.A. Memorial Stadium^	Chillicothe, Ohio	3,000+
Northeast	Johnstown Mill Rats	2020	2021	Point Stadium^	Johnstown, Pennsylvania	7,500
Northeast	Kokomo Creek Chubs	2026		Kokomo Municipal Stadium	Kokomo, Indiana	4,000
Northeast	Lafayette Aviators	2015		Loeb Stadium	Lafayette, Indiana	2,600
Central	Danville Dans	1989	2009	Danville Stadium^	Danville, Illinois	4,000
Central	Decatur Bean Ballers	2026		Workman Family Baseball Field	Decatur, Illinois	459
Central	Dubois County Bombers	1998	2024	League Stadium^	Huntingburg, Indiana	3,300
Central	Springfield Lucky Horseshoes	2007	2009	Robin Roberts Stadium^	Springfield, Illinois	5,200
Central	Terre Haute Rex	2010		Bob Warn Field at Sycamore Stadium	Terre Haute, Indiana	2,500
Western Conference
Division	Team	Founded	Joined	Stadium	City	Capacity
Northwest	Burlington Bees*	1924	2021	Community Field^	Burlington, Iowa	3,200
Northwest	Clinton LumberKings*	1954	2021	NelsonCorp Field^	Clinton, Iowa	5,500
Northwest	Illinois Valley Pistol Shrimp	2019	2021	Schweickert Stadium at Veterans Memorial Park	Peru, Illinois	575+
Northwest	Normal CornBelters*	2009	2019	The Corn Crib^	Normal, Illinois	7,000
Northwest	Quincy Doggy Paddlers	2025		QU Stadium^	Quincy, Illinois	2,000
South	Alton River Dragons	2020	2021	Lloyd Hopkins Field	Alton, Illinois	2,500
South	Cape Catfish	2018	2019	Capaha Field	Cape Girardeau, Missouri	2,000
South	Jackson Rockabillys	2023		The Ballpark at Jackson^	Jackson, Tennessee	6,000
South	O'Fallon Hoots	2018	2020	CarShield Field^	O'Fallon, Missouri	5,150
South	Thrillville Thrillbillies	2023		Marion Stadium^	Marion, Illinois	7,000

* Former professional baseball team
^ Former professional baseball venue

Charter members: Butler BlueSox, Champion City Kings (as the Slippery Rock Sliders), Chillicothe Paints, Danville Dans, DuPage Dragons, Hannibal Cavemen, North Coast Knights, Richmond RiverRats, Springfield Sliders, Quincy Gems

=== Former members ===
Team	City	Joined	Left	Current league
Butler BlueSox	Butler, Pennsylvania	2009	2018	Tri-State Collegiate League
DeKalb County Liners	Sycamore, Illinois	2010	2011	none (defunct)
DuPage Dragons	Lisle, Illinois	2009	2011	none (defunct)
DuPage Drones	Lisle, Illinois	2016		none (defunct)
Full Count Rhythm	Hendersonville, Tennessee	2024		Ohio Valley League
Hannibal Cavemen	Hannibal, Missouri	2009	2016	none (defunct)
Hannibal Hoots	Hannibal, Missouri	2018	2019	Moved to O'Fallon, Missouri in 2020
Jamestown Jammers	Jamestown, New York	2015		none (defunct)
Kokomo Jackrabbits	Kokomo, Indiana	2015	2018	Northwoods League
Lorain County Ironmen	Lorain, Ohio	2010	2014	Great Lakes Summer Collegiate League
Nashville Outlaws	Nashville, Tennessee	2010	2012	none (defunct)
North Coast Knights	Lorain, Ohio	2009		Renamed to Lorain County Ironmen in 2010
Quincy Gems	Quincy, Illinois	2009	2023	none (defunct)
Richmond RiverRats	Richmond, Indiana	2009	2015	none (defunct)
Slippery Rock Sliders	Slippery Rock, Pennsylvania	2009	2013	Moved to Springfield, Ohio in 2013
West Virginia Miners	Beckley, West Virginia	2010	2022	none (defunct)

The Cape Catfish, DuPage Pistol Shrimp and Normal CornBelters joined the league in the 2019, replacing the Kokomo Jackrabbits, who left for the Northwoods League, and the Butler BlueSox, who suspended operations.

== Division and league champions ==
=== Playoff format ===
2009: After 56-game schedule, teams with best record in each division faced each other in a best-of-three series for the Championship.

2010: 56-game schedule divided in two halves. Winners from each half in each division faced each other in a one-game playoff (home field to team with best overall record). Where the same team won both halves in a division, the team with the next-best overall record from that division was declared the wild card. Championship Series was a two-game affair with the divisional playoff winner with the best overall record receiving a bye into the Championship Game. The remaining two divisional playoff winners met in a one-game play-in for the right to go to the Championship Game. Championship Series held at Chillicothe, Ohio.

Teams in italics qualified for that season's playoffs as a wild card entry under that particular season's playoff format.

2011: 56-game schedule divided in two halves. Winners from each half in each division faced each other in a one-game playoff (home field to team winning the first half). Where the same team won both halves in a division, the team with the next-best overall record from that division was declared the wild card. Divisional playoff winners met in one-game playoff with home field awarded to the team with the best overall record from the regular season.

2012: 60-game schedule divided in two halves. Winners from each half in each division to face each other in a one-game playoff to be hosted by the first-half champions in each division. If the same team wins both halves, the team with the best overall record from that division will be declared the wild card. Winners of each divisional playoff game will meet in a best-of-three Championship Series, with home advantage given to the division that wins the annual All-Star Game (to be held in Butler, PA). Game One of the Championship Series will be played at the home field of the team from the losing division at the All-Star Game, with Game Two and Game Three (if necessary) held at the home field of the team from the winning division at the All-Star Game.

2013–2016: 60-game schedule divided into two halves. Winners from each half in each division to face each other in a best-of-three with game one being held at second-half winner and games two and three (if necessary) at home of first-half winner. There are no travel days in the Division Series. Each division champion plays in the best-of-three Prospect League Championship Series. Game one is held at the home of the team representing the division that lost that year's All-Star Game. Games two and three (if necessary) are held at the home of the team representing the division that won that year's All-Star Game.

2017–2019: After a 60-game schedule, the top two teams in the East Division and the West Division play each other in the first round in a best of 3 series with the first place teams getting home field advantage. The winner of the East Division and West Division series face off in a best-of-three Prospect League Championship series with the team with the best record getting home field advantage.

2020–2025: After a 60-game schedule, the two teams that win the first and second half-season titles in each division play each other in a one-game divisional championship round, with first-half winners in each division hosting the second-half winners (If the same team wins both halves, the team with the next-best second-half record makes the playoffs). After that, the two division champions in each conference face off in a winner-take-all conference championship game. Lastly, the two conference champions will face off in a best-of-three league championship series.

2026–present: After a 56-game schedule, the two teams that win the first and second half-season titles in each division play each other in a one-game divisional championship round, with first-half winners in each division hosting the second-half winners (If the same team wins both halves, the team with the next-best second-half record makes the playoffs). After that, the two division champions in each conference face off in a winner-take-all conference championship game. Lastly, the two conference champions will face off in a best-of-three league championship series.

=== Championship results ===
Championship results
Year	East Division playoff champion		West Division playoff champion		League champions
2009	Chillicothe Paints	0	Quincy Gems	2	Quincy Gems
2010	Chillicothe Paints	1	Danville Dans	0	Chillicothe Paints
2011	West Virginia Miners	0	Quincy Gems	1	Quincy Gems
2012	West Virginia Miners	2	Dubois County Bombers	0	West Virginia Miners
2013	West Virginia Miners	2	Quincy Gems	0	West Virginia Miners
2014	Chillicothe Paints	1	Quincy Gems	2	Quincy Gems
2015	West Virginia Miners	0	Terre Haute Rex	2	Terre Haute Rex
2016	West Virginia Miners	2	Quincy Gems	0	West Virginia Miners
2017	Butler BlueSox	1	Lafayette Aviators	2	Lafayette Aviators
2018	Kokomo Jackrabbits	0	Terre Haute Rex	2	Terre Haute Rex
2019	Chillicothe Paints	2	Cape Catfish	1	Chillicothe Paints
2020	None (season cancelled due to COVID-19 pandemic)				
2021	Lafayette Aviators	1	Cape Catfish	2	Cape Catfish
2022	Chillicothe Paints	2	Alton River Dragons	1	Chillicothe Paints
2023	Chillicothe Paints	2	Quincy Gems	1	Chillicothe Paints
2024	Terre Haute Rex	0	Illinois Valley Pistol Shrimp	2	Illinois Valley Pistol Shrimp
2025	Lafayette Aviators	0	Cape Catfish	2	Cape Catfish

Championship appearances by team
Total	Titles	Team	Last
6	4	Chillicothe Paints	2023
6	3	Quincy Gems	2023
5	3	West Virginia Miners	2016
3	2	Terre Haute Rex	2024
3	2	Cape Catfish	2025
3	1	Lafayette Aviators	2025
1	1	Illinois Valley Pistol Shrimp	2024
1	0	Danville Dans	2010
1	0	Dubois County Bombers	2012
1	0	Butler BlueSox	2017
1	0	Kokomo Jackrabbits	2018
1	0	Alton River Dragons	2022

== Awards ==
=== Mike Schmidt Award winners (Player of the Year) ===
Year	Winner	Position	Team
2009	Tyler Bullock	Catcher	Richmond River Rats
2010	Jeff Holm	Outfielder	Chillicothe Paints
2011	Chris Serritella	First Baseman	Quincy Gems
2012	Matt Tellor	Infielder	Springfield Sliders
2013	Matt Calhoun	Infielder	Slippery Rock Sliders
2014	Ronnie Dawson	Outfielder	Chillicothe Paints
2015	David Marcus	First Baseman	Butler Bluesox
2016	Aaron Meyer	Second Baseman	DuPage Drones
2017	Dougie Parks	Third Baseman	Lafayette Aviators
2019	Andrew Stone	Outfielder	Cape Catfish
2020	Season cancelled (COVID-19 pandemic)		
2021	Jackson Jones	Infielder	Burlington Bees
2022	Eddie King Jr.	Outfielder	Alton River Dragons
2023	Tim Orr	Infielder	Chillicothe Paints
2024	Eric Colaco	Outfielder	Chillicothe Paints
2025	Wally Diaz	Infielder	Terre Haute Rex

=== Pitcher of the Year Award winners ===
Year	Winner	Throws	Team
2009	Rusty Shellhorn	Left	Northcoast Knights
2010	Dean Wolosianski	Right	West Virginia Miners
2011	Clayton Schulz	Left	Chillicothe Paints
2012	Kris Gardner (LH Starter), Sam Lewis (RH Starter)		Hannibal Cavemen, West Virginia Miners
2013	Wes Judish	Right	Hannibal Cavemen
2014	Adam Bleday (LH Starter), Chase Boster (RH Starter)		Butler BlueSox, West Virginia Miners
2015	Tanner Allison	Left	Chillicothe Paints
2016	Brian Hobbie	Right	Terre Haute Rex
2017	Brad Depperman	Right	Lafayette Aviators
2019	Bryan McNeely	Right	Cape Catfish
2020	Season cancelled (COVID-19 pandemic)		
2021	Ryan Eiermann	Left	Illinois Valley Pistol Shrimp
2022	Josh Leerssen	Right	Danville Dans
2023	Sebastian Gonzalez	Left	Illinois Valley Pistol Shrimp
2024	Ean DiPasquale	Right	Clinton LumberKings
2025	Samuel Guadamuz	Right	Terre Haute Rex

=== Reliever of the Year Award winners ===
Year	Winner	Team
2010	Wil Browning	Danville Dans
2011	Chase Byerly	Slippery Rock Sliders
2012	Nick Blount	Terre Haute Rex
2014	Kolin Stanley	West Virginia Miners
2015	Derek Hendrixson	Chillicothe Paints
2016	Sean Frontzak	DuPage Drones
2017	Eddie Miller	Terre Haute Rex
2018	Jack Raines	Chillicothe Paints
2019	Nate Haugh	Chillicothe Paints
2020	Season cancelled (COVID-19 pandemic)	
2021	Anthony Klein	O'Fallon Hoots
2022	Landon Tomkins	Danville Dans
2023	Sebastian Gonzalez	Illinois Valley Pistol Shrimp
2024	Jaxson Lucas	Jackson Rockabillys
2025	Parker Primeaux	Illinois Valley Pistol Shrimp

=== Pro Prospect of the Year Award winners ===
Year	Winner	Team
2010	Jeff Holm	Chillicothe Paints
2011	Chris Saritella	Quincy Gems
2012	Matt Tellor; Nick Blount	Springfield Sliders; Terre Haute Rex
2013	Troy Conyers	Danville Dans
2014	Ronnie Dawson	Chillicothe Paints
2015	David Marcus	Butler BlueSox
2017	Brad Depperman	Lafayette Aviators
2018	Dillon Dingler; Dick Miller	Chillicothe Paints; Springfield Sliders
2019	Andrew Stone	Cape Catfish
2020	Season cancelled (COVID-19 pandemic)	
2021	Ryan Eierman	Illinois Valley Pistol Shrimp
2022	Khal Stephen	Danville Dans
2023	Sebastian Gonzalez	Illinois Valley Pistol Shrimp
2024	Eric Colaco	Chillicothe Paints
2025	Wally Diaz	Terre Haute Rex

=== Manager of the Year ===
Year	Winner	Team
2010	Brian Mannino	Chillicothe Paints
2011	Chris Martin	Quincy Gems
2012	Ryan Anderson; Brian Dorsett	DuBois County Bombers; Terre Haute Rex
2013	Jason Watson	Danville Dans
2014	Anthony Rebyanski	Butler BlueSox
2015	Bobby Segal	Terre Haute Rex
2017	Brent McNeil	Lafayette Aviators
2018	Gary McClure	Kokomo Jackrabbits
2019	Steve Larkin	Cape Catfish
2020	Season cancelled (COVID-19 pandemic)	
2021	Steve Larkin	Cape Catfish
2022	Eric Coleman	Danville Dans
2023	Ralph Santana	Thrillville Thrillbillies
2024	John Jakiemiec	Illinois Valley Pistol Shrimp
2025	Jack Dahm	Clinton LumberKings
