= Alliance (disambiguation) =

An alliance is usually an agreement between two or more parties, made in order to advance common goals and to secure common interests.

Alliance, Alliances or The Alliance may also refer to:

== Places ==
=== United States ===
- Alliance, California, a former unincorporated community
- Alliance, Indiana, an unincorporated town
- Alliance, Nebraska, a city
- Alliance, North Carolina, a town
- Alliance, Ohio, a city
  - Alliance station, an Amtrak station
- Alliance, Texas, a planned community
- Alliance Township, Clay County, Minnesota

=== Elsewhere ===
- Alliance, Alberta, Canada, a village
- Alliance, Suriname, a town

== In politics ==
- Electoral alliance, an association of political parties or individuals that exists solely to stand in elections
- Canadian Alliance, a defunct political party
- Alliance (Chile), a coalition of right-wing parties
- Alliance Party (Fiji), the ruling party in Fiji from 1966 to 1987, now dissolved
- The Alliance for Workers' Liberty, a Third Camp Trotskyist organisation in Britain
- The Alliance (France), a centrist, liberal, ecologist, and social-liberal coalition from 2011 to 2012
- The Alliance (Hong Kong)
- Alliance Party (Malaysia), a coalition from 1953 to 1975
- Alliance (New Zealand political party), a left-wing party
- Alliance Party of Northern Ireland
- Alliance (Poland), a party
- Alliance (Portugal), a party
- Alliance (Saint Martin), a party
- Alliance (Slovak political party), a party
- Alliance (Sweden), an alliance of four centre-right parties in the Riksdag
- SDP–Liberal Alliance, an alliance of the Social Democratic Party and the Liberal Party

== Businesses ==
- Alliance Films, a Canadian former motion picture distribution/production company
- Alliance Game Distributors, a North American distributor of RPGs, board-games and card games
- Alliance Group, a New Zealand sheep meat producer based in Invercargill
- Alliance Healthcare, a European wholesaler, distributor and retailer of pharmaceutical, surgical, medical and healthcare products
- Alliance Semiconductor, an American former semiconductor company
- Alliance Tire Company, a tire manufacturing company based in Hadera, Israel
- Alliance Witan plc, a publicly traded investment and financial services company headquartered in Dundee, Scotland

== Aviation ==
- Airline alliance A group of airlines that work together cooperatively
- Alliance Air (India), former name of Air India Regional, an airline
- Alliance Air (Uganda), an airline from 1995 to 2000
- Alliance Airlines, an Australian charter airline

== Ships ==
- HMS Alliance, three ships
- USS Alliance, two ships
- NRV Alliance, a research vessel of the Centre for Maritime Research and Experimentation

== Automobiles ==
- Alliance (1904 automobile), an early German automobile
- Alliance (1905 automobile), an early French automobile
- Renault Alliance, a subcompact manufactured from 1983 to 1987 for North America

== In arts and entertainment ==
=== Alliance ===
- Alliance, a nation in the science fiction Alliance–Union universe of C. J. Cherryh
  - Alliance Rising, a 2019 science fiction novel set in the Alliance–Union universe by C. J. Cherryh and Jane S. Fancher
  - Alliance Unbound, a 2024 science fiction novel set in the Alliance–Union universe by C. J. Cherryh and Jane S. Fancher
- Alliance, a 1990 science fiction novel by Jerry Oltion in the Isaac Asimov's Robots and Aliens series
- Alliance (Thor album), 2021
- Alliance (Grailknights album), 2008
- The Alliance, nickname for the Media, Entertainment and Arts Alliance, Australian professional association
- The Alliance (band), a group of dancehall artists founded by Bounty Killer
- Alliance (DC Comics), a fictional organization of alien freedom fighters
- Alliance (esports), a Swedish esports organization
- Alliance (Firefly), a fictional government in the Serenity franchise
- Alliance (sculpture), in the centre of Cardiff, Wales
- "The Alliance" (Modern Family)
- "The Alliance" (The Office)
- Alliance Theatre, a theater company in Atlanta, Georgia
- The Alliance (Warcraft), an alliance in World of Warcraft

=== Alliances ===
- Alliances, an expansion for the trading card game Magic: The Gathering from the Ice Age block
- Alliances (Champions), a 1997 supplement for the role-playing game Champions
- "Alliances" (Star Trek: Voyager), a 1996 episode in the TV series Star Trek: Voyager
- Alliances (novel), a Dragonlance book by Paul B. Thompson and Tonya C. Cook
- Alliances (The Wire), a 2006 episode of The Wire
- Stargate SG-1: Alliances, a 2006 novel by Karen Miller

== Schools ==
- Alliance University, Bangalore, India, a private university established in 2010
- Alliance College, Cambridge Springs, Pennsylvania, an independent, liberal arts college which closed in 1987
- Alliance High School (disambiguation)

== Sport ==
- Alliance of American Football, a professional American football league
- Alliance Jiu Jitsu, Brazilian jiu-jitsu association
- Alliance Sport Alsace, French basketball team
- The Alliance (professional wrestling), a professional wrestling faction
- Alliance United, a Canadian soccer team

== Other uses ==
- Alliance (phytosociology), a unit of vegetation in phytosociology
- Alliance Pipeline, a Canadian natural gas pipeline
- Alliance (taxonomy), an informal taxonomic grouping of species or genera that have at some time been considered similar
- David Alliance, Baron Alliance (1932–2025), British businessman and Liberal Democrat politician

== See also ==
- Alliance coupler
- Alianza (disambiguation)
- Alliance Party (disambiguation)
- Northern Alliance (disambiguation)
- Unholy Alliance (disambiguation)
- Coalition (disambiguation)
