= Dead or Alive (Grailknights EP) =

EP by Grailknights
- Released: 18 March 2016
- Recorded: 2015
- Genre: Power metal, melodic death metal
- Length: 23:00
- Label: Intono

Grailknights chronology
Calling the Choir (2014)	Dead or Alive (2016)	Knightfall (2018)

Professional ratings
Review scores
Source	Rating
Monkeypress.de	7/10
Rock Hard	6/10
Time for Metal	8/10

Dead or Alive is the second EP by German power metal band Grailknights. It was released on 18 March 2016, through Intono Records.

== Track listing ==
No.	Title	Length
1.	"Dead or Alive"	4:24
2.	"Crimson Shades of Glory"	4:34
3.	"Rise of the Black Knight"	5:00
4.	"Fuel the Flame"	5:08
5.	"Superhero Medley"	3:54
Total length:		23:00

== Personnel ==
- Sir Optimus Prime – vocals, guitars
- Sovereign Storm – guitars
- Earl Quake – guitars
- Count Cranium – bass
- Lord Drumcules – drums
