= Napraty =

- Village
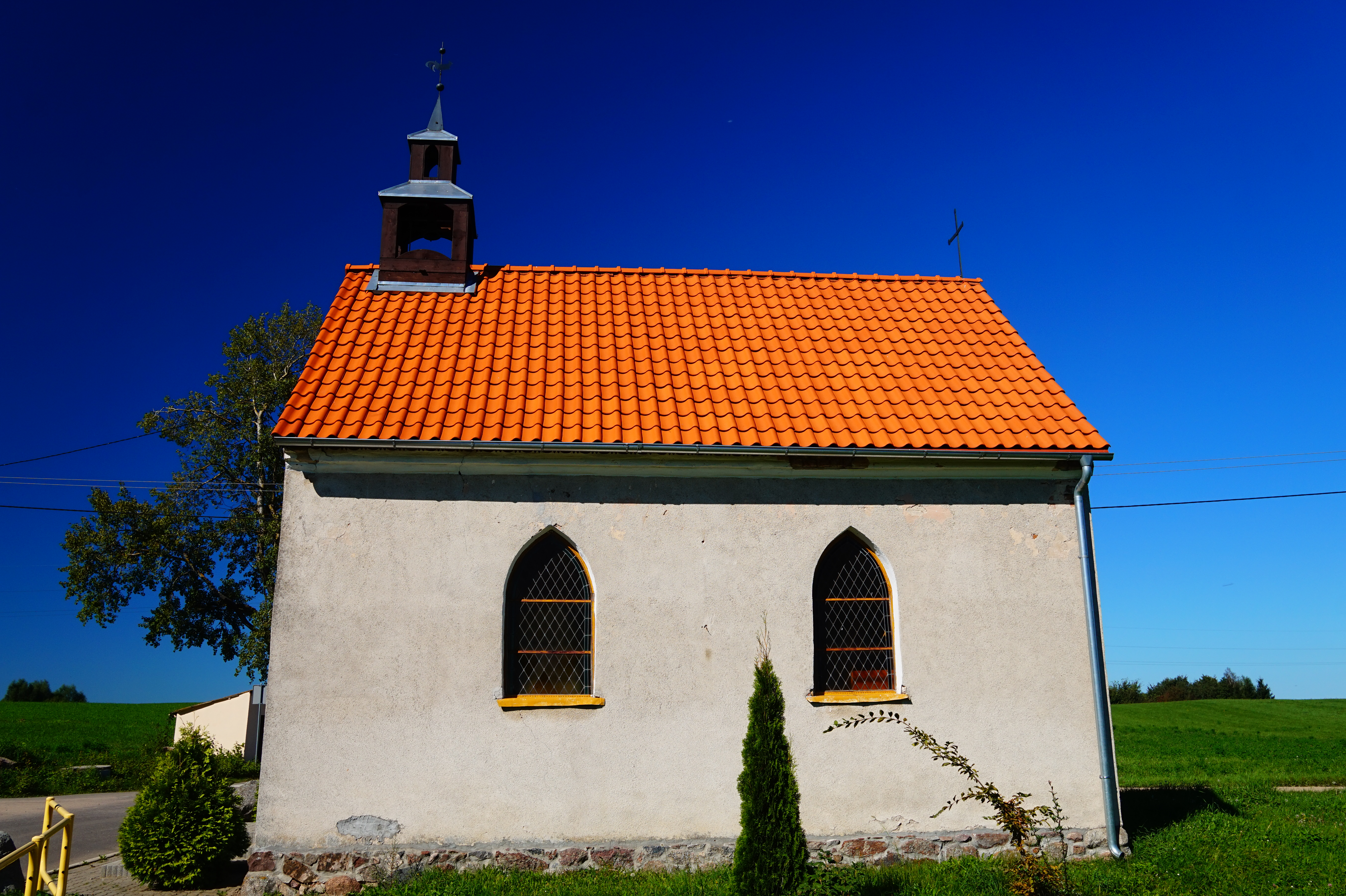
- Immaculate Conception chapel in Napraty

- Location within Poland
- Coordinates: 54°9′N 20°42′E
- Country: Poland
- Voivodeship: Warmian-Masurian
- County: Lidzbark
- Gmina: Kiwity

Population (approx.)
  - Total: 100
- Time zone: UTC+1 (CET)
  - Summer (DST): UTC+2 (CEST)
- Vehicle registration: NLI

Napraty [naˈpratɨ] is a village in the administrative district of Gmina Kiwity, within Lidzbark County, Warmian-Masurian Voivodeship, in northern Poland. It is located in the historic region of Warmia, approximately 8 km (5 mi) north-west of Kiwity, 9 km (6 mi) north-east of Lidzbark Warmiński, and 43 km (27 mi) north of the regional capital Olsztyn.

== Notable residents ==
- Otto Friedrich von der Groeben (1657-1728), Prussian colonel and Polish lieutenant general
