= Sam Longmire =

American football player (born 1943)

No. 48
- Positions: Defensive back, Wide receiver

Personal information
- Born: January 3, 1943 (age 83); Birmingham, Alabama, U.S.
- Listed height: 6 ft 3 in (1.91 m)
- Listed weight: 195 lb (88 kg)

Career information
- High school: Alliance
- College: Purdue
- NFL draft: 1965: undrafted

Career history
- Kansas City Chiefs (1965–1968); Charleston Rockets (1966)
- Stats at Pro Football Reference

Samuel Robert Longmire (born January 3, 1943) is an American former professional football player who was a defensive back for the Kansas City Chiefs of the National Football League (NFL). He played college football for the Purdue University
