= Moshfegh Hamadani =

Iranian Jewish political journalist and writer

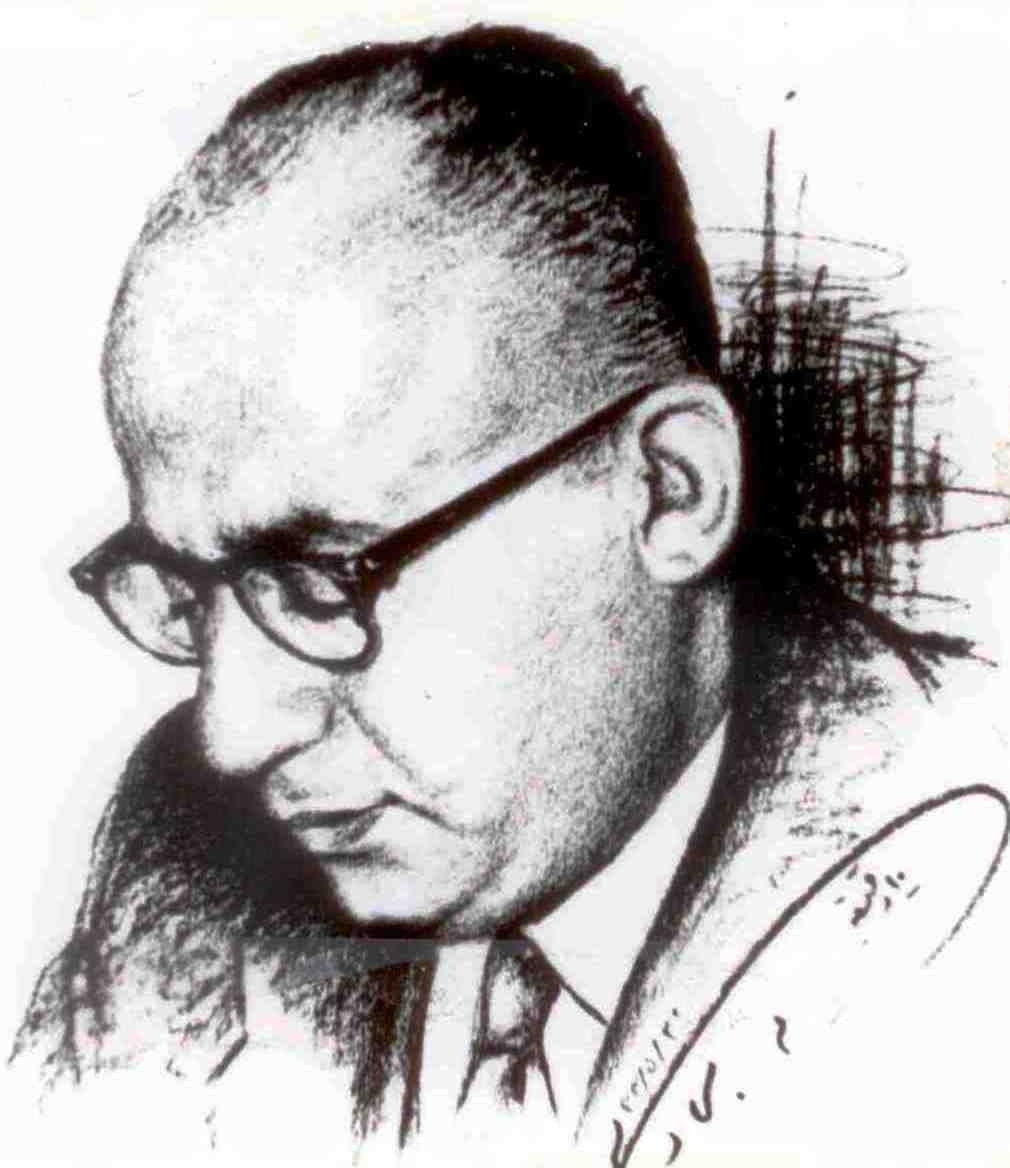
Portrait of Raby Moshfegh Hamadani by Mehdi Sadjadi in 1954

Raby Moshfegh Hamadani (Persian: ربيع مشفق همدانى; 1912–2009) was an Iranian Jewish political journalist and writer.

== Early life and education ==
Hamadani was born in Hamadan, Iran, in April 1912. His father, Davoud Kohan, son of Yitzak, was a Jewish merchant in this ancient city, which since immemorial times has been a center of commerce on the Silk Road and was once the capital of the Persian Empire (Ecbatana). Raby’s grandfather Yitzak had travelled to Jerusalem three times by horse and carriage to visit the sacred city, receiving the title of "Haji Yitzak" and was highly respected as a member of the Jewish community of Hamadan.

Hamadani attended the Alliance Israelite School in Hamadan, where he became fluent in French. During his childhood and teen-age years, as reported in his published memoirs he experienced the bitter taste of antisemitism at the hand of his neighbors. But the constitutional revolution of 1906 and the overthrow of the Qajar dynasty in 1925 by Reza Shah when Raby was thirteen years old, infused a new wave of education, progress and modernization throughout the country. Growing up in this atmosphere of hope and enthusiasm, the young, idealist Hamadani became convinced that embracing Reza Shah's modernization policy was a necessary step for the advancement of Iran in general and for achieving equality for the Jewish minority in a Muslim society, where they were seldom treated as equals. Reza Shah planned to follow the path of Mustafa Kemal Ataturk of Turkey to curtail the power of the religious clerics that historically held a strong grip on society and exerted considerable political power in all aspects of Iranian society. A modernization plan appeared to be the only means to achieve equality and prosperity for Iranian Jews and other members of religious minorities. Iran needed the energetic infusion of the talented and well-educated younger generation to reestablish her place among the great nations of the Middle East. In 1931, the young high school graduate decided to travel to Tehran, to become involved in this new wave of modernization. He was determined to participate in the admission exams at the newly founded University of Teheran. He passed the entrance examinations with honors and enrolled in the Department of Literature of the University. He did not have the financial means for paying his tuition, and sold his violin and was fortunate enough to get a job, upon recommendation from one of his high-school teachers, to teach French language at the prestigious Dar ul-Funun (Persia) دارالفنون high school of Tehran. He graduated in 1939 from the university with a degree in Philosophy and Educational Sciences. As partial fulfilment of the graduation requirements, he translated Schopenhauer's selected works into Farsi, and defended it as his thesis. These essays included difficult and controversial philosophical concepts on women and the meaning of love. He took the first of many steps on the path of journalism and authorship, by publishing this thesis, as his first book, with the title of "Schopenhauer’s Philosophy of Love”فلسفه عشق شوپنهاور, which brought him great recognition and opened the doors to his subsequent literary and journalistic career.

Hamadani intensified his literary work while continuing with his employment first as a teacher at Dar ul-Funun, and later as an employee of the Ministry of Foreign Affairs, where he was appointed as French translator and eventually promoted to Director of the Pars News Agency, overseeing the translation of international news for the Iranian press. He translated many world-famous masterpieces by Dostoevsky, Tolstoy, Flaubert, Lockhart, John Dewey and other famous authors, exposing Iranian readers to western masterpieces not available in Farsi at the time. He also translated many volumes on modern concepts in education, sociology and psychology. He was a prolific writer, authoring several works of fiction that first appeared in weekly instalments in renowned magazines of that era, such as Omide Iran أميد أايران, Teherane Mossawar تهران مصور and others. These writings, which were later published as stand-alone books (listed in the following bibliography), had great success in illustrating the frustrations and tribulations of a young and well-educated generation of Iranians confronted by the chaotic socio-political changes caused by the rapid modernization of the country. His books quickly turned into best sellers and received outstanding reviews and literary prizes, paving the way for his subsequent career as a well-known author, journalist and translator.

Cover of Kavian Magazine, Vol.4. No 15. "Disagreements between the Shah and Mossadegh" (Thursday 19 March 1953)

During the Second World War, Hamadani was appointed editor in chief of Keyhan كيهإن the highly circulated and most popular daily newspaper distributed nationally throughout Iran. In his editorials, he embraced and supported the political platform of nationalizing Iran's oil industry, controlled by the Anglo Iranian Oil Company (AIOC, later renamed British Petroleum BP), as introduced by Dr.Mohammad Mossadegh and the National Front of Iran. In 1949, after seven years as Keyhan’s editor-in-chief, he founded the weekly magazine Kavian كأؤيإن (a politically oriented publication with a distinctly secular and nationalistic voice) and became one of Mossadegh's ardent supporters in the latter's plan to nationalize the Iranian oil industry (see Abadan Crisis). Hamadani implemented grandiose plans for expansion of Kavian' s activities, including a bookstore and publishing house (Bongah Matbouati Safialishah (بنكاه مطبوعاتى صفيعليشاه), directed by his brothers Parviz, Mansour and Nasser) and a printing press (Kavian كأؤيإن, directed by his other brother Yahya). He imported and established the technology of printing the cover pages of Kavian in four colors, a unique novelty at the time, that increased the weekly magazine's popularity and circulation. Both the bookstore and printing press businesses were located in Tehran's city center (Baharestan square ميدان بهارستان ), in close proximity to Iran's National Assembly (Majles Shoraye Melli مجلسِ شوراي ملي) , and became a popular gathering place for writers, journalists and politicians to visit and discuss the political and social news of the day. Hamadani was invited in 1951 by President Harry Truman, together with twenty other Iranian intellectuals, businessmen and influential journalists (Hamadani, Dr. Alamooti and Dr. Shifteh) to visit the United States in conjunction with the "International Leadership" program implemented by Truman's administration. Hamadani accompanied Dr. Mossadegh during his visit to the United Nations where the latter successfully defended Iran's claims against AIOC and BP and famously argued for the Iranian government's position on the nationalization of the oil industry, the main political platform of the National Front. Although the international court at Hague ruled in favor of Iran, the post-war administration of President Eisenhower was persuaded by Churchill and the British government that Mossadegh's position would play in the hands of the Communist Party of Iran (Hezb Tudeh حزب توده), which was a puppet of the Soviets. Therefore, in order to prevent the potential demise of Iran away from the west and into the Soviet sphere of influence, Eisenhower agreed for the CIA to collaborate and support the ongoing British Intelligence Service MI6 plans aimed at orchestrating the overthrow of Mossadegh by a military coup (1953 Iranian coup d'état). This attempt failed at first and led to the Shah's leaving the country, but on August 19, 1953, the waves turned and Mossadegh was detained by the new Prime Minister General Zahedi appointed by Mohammad Reza Shah. Hamadani' s stance against the monarchy and in support of Mossadegh would cost him dearly: after the CIA/MI6-led coup that overthrew Mossadegh, Kavian 's offices and printing presses were looted and burned. Mossadegh, a number of his cabinet ministers and all other journalists and politicians that supported him were arrested. Some were accused of conspiring with the Communist Tudeh Party of Iran (Hezb Tudeh حزب توده) to overthrow the monarchy and institute a new republican constitution. They were treated as traitors and tried in military courts. Some, like Mossadegh's Minister of Foreign Affairs, Dr. Hossein Fatemi were executed, while others, like Hamadani were imprisoned. Mossadegh was tried and exiled to his native city of Ahmadabad. Hamadani was eventually banished from Iran. He left his family behind, relinquishing his printing and publishing businesses to be managed by his brothers. For the next 50 years, he lived in exile in Rome, Italy, and later in Los Angeles, California, where he continued his literary activities by translating various French, English, and Italian literary works into Farsi. After the Islamic Revolution in Iran in 1979 resulting in the immigration of his extended family to the United States, he also left Italy to join them in Los Angeles, and continued to publish numerous articles, books and translations. A documentary film about his life was produced by the Center for Iranian Jewish Oral History and is available from the Library of Congress. Hamadani died on 2 October 2009.

== Bibliography and publications ==
In addition to the hundreds of articles, short stories and sociopolitical editorials published by Hamadani over the course of his fifty-year career in journalism, his collected writings and translations number well over fifty book titles published in Iran and abroad. His most acclaimed novels include:

- Eshgh va Eshgh (عشق و عشق, Love and Love)

- Delhoreh haye javani (دلهره هاى جوانى, Anxieties of Youth)

- Tahsil-kardeh ha (تحصيلكردها, The Educated Ones

- Khaterate Neem Gharn Rooznameh Neghari (خاطرات نيم قرن روزنامه نكارى, Memoirs of Half a Century in Journalism).

His translations from English, French and Italian include:

- Tolstoy: Anna Karenina (ﺁنا كارنينا ) and Selected Letters (نامه هاى تولستوى )

- Flaubert: Madame Bovary (مادام بوارى)

- Dostoevsky: Humiliated and Insulted (ازردكان), The Idiot (ابله), The Karamazov Brothers (برادران كارامازوف)

as well as numerous scientific works in the fields of history, psychology, sociology and philosophy as partially listed here:

Biographies:

- Stalin استالين (by Emil Ludwig)

- Napoleon نابلئون (by Louis Madelaine)

- Nader Shah نادر شاه (by L. Lockhart).

Psychology:

- Childhood and Adolescence روانشناسي كودك و بالغ (by J.A. Hadfield)

- Discovering Ourselves روانشناسي براى همه by E.A. Strecher and K.E. Appel; Between

- Parent and Child روابط والدين با فرزندان by Haiim Ginott

- Love Against Hate اعجاز روانكاوى by Karl and Jeanetta Menninger

- Teaching the Slow Learner كودكان ديرﺁموز by W.B. Featherstone

- Personal Magnetism مانيتيسم شخصى by Paul C. Jagot;

- Secrets of Mind Power حافظه در روانشناسي by Harry Lorayne.

- The Schools of Tomorrow اموزشكاه هاي فردا by John Dewey

Sociology:

- Human Nature and Conduct اخلاق و شخصيت, School and the Student مدرسه و شاكرد, School and Society مدرسه و اجتماع by John Dewey

- Sociology جامعه شناسي by Samuel King

- What is Sociology? جامعه شناسي جيست by Alex Inkeles.

Philosophy:

- Schiller's masterworks شاهكارهاي شيللر

- Schopenhauer's selected works افكار شوبنهاور
