= List of cemeteries in Israel =

This is a list of cemeteries in Israel.

== Central District ==
- Segula Cemetery
- Yarkon Cemetery
- Ramleh War Cemetery (military)
- Templar Cemetery, Jaffa

== Haifa District ==
- Sde Yehoshua Cemetery
- Khayat Beach War Cemetery (military)

== Jerusalem District ==
=== Christian ===
- Mount Zion Cemetery
- Franciscan Cemetery, Mount Zion

=== Jewish ===
- Har HaMenuchot
- Mount of Olives
- Sanhedria Cemetery
- Shaare Zedek Cemetery
- Sheikh Badr Cemetery

=== Military ===
- Jerusalem British war cemetery
- Mount Herzl

=== Muslim ===
- Mamilla Cemetery

== Northern District ==
- Nazareth German war cemetery (military)

== Southern District ==
- Tel Shoket (Muslim)

== Tel Aviv District ==
- Kiryat Shaul Cemetery
- Nahalat Yitzhak Cemetery
- Trumpeldor Cemetery
