= Oberschleißheim =

- Municipality
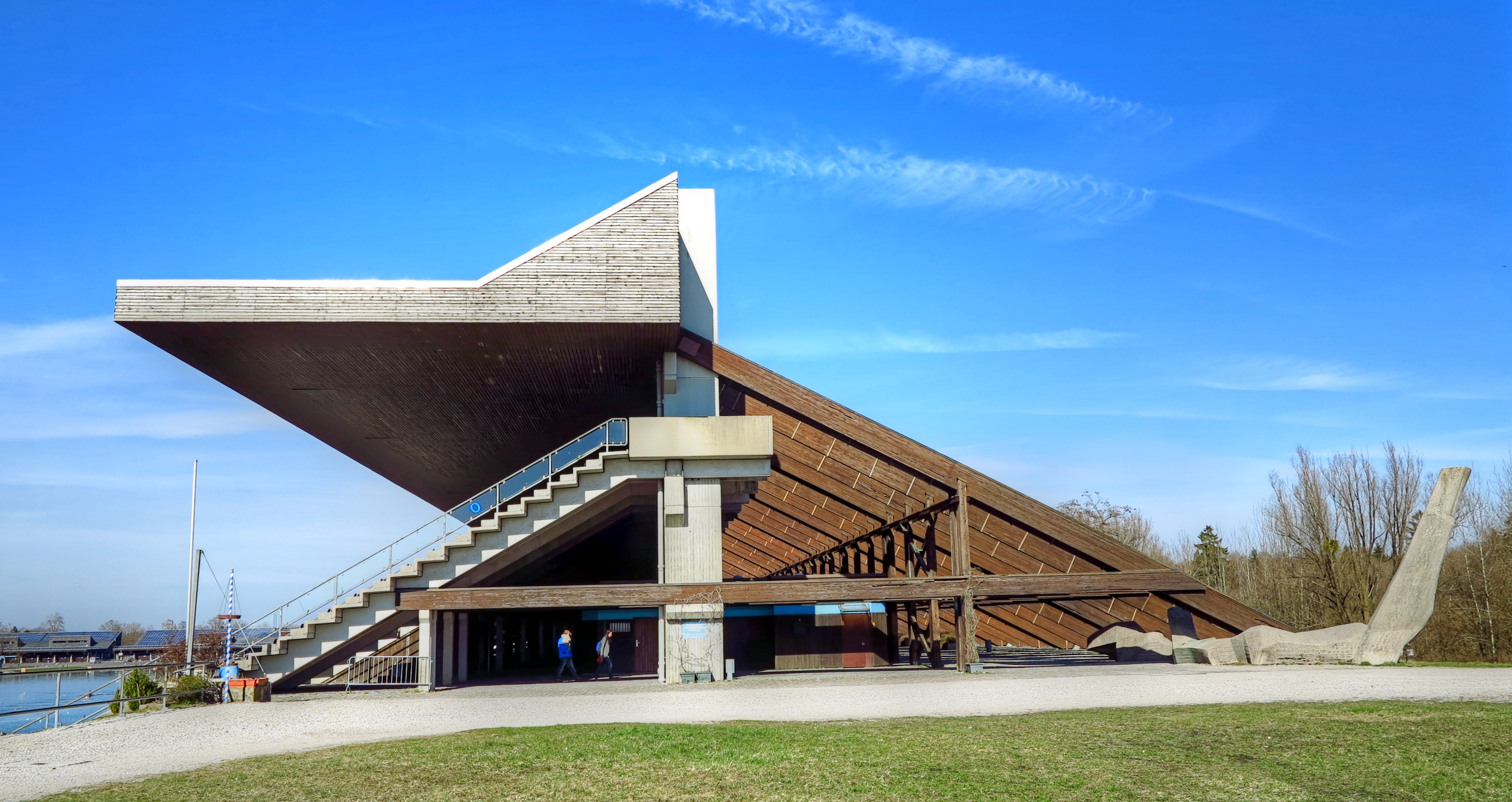
- Regatta stand

- Coat of arms

- Location of Oberschleißheim within Munich district
- Interactive map of Oberschleißheim
- Location within Germany Location within Bavaria
- Coordinates: 48°15′N 11°34′E
- Country: Germany
- State: Bavaria
- Admin. region: Oberbayern
- District: Munich
- Subdivisions: 9 Ortsteile: Altschleißheim, Neuschleißheim, Lustheim

Government
  - Mayor (2020–26): Markus Böck (CSU)

Area
  - Total: 30.32 km^{2} (11.71 sq mi)
- Elevation: 483 m (1,585 ft)

Population (2025-12-31)
  - Total: 11,926
  - Density: 393.3/km^{2} (1,019/sq mi)
- Time zone: UTC+01:00 (CET)
  - Summer (DST): UTC+02:00 (CEST)
- Postal codes: 85764
- Dialling codes: 089
- Vehicle registration: M and MU
- Website: www.oberschleissheim.de

Oberschleißheim (German pronunciation: [oːbɐˈʃlaɪsˌhaɪm], lit. 'Upper Schleißheim', in contrast to "Lower Schleißheim") is a municipality in the district of Munich, and a suburb to Munich in Bavaria, in southern Germany. It is located 13 km north of Munich (centre). As of 2005 it had a population of 11,467.

Oberschleißheim is best known for the Schleissheim Palace and the Flugwerft Schleissheim, an airfield next to the palace, which includes an aerospace museum.

== Geography ==
The area is about 17 Kilometers north of Munich city and about 23 Kilometers south of Freising. The area lies between the River Isar and the River Amper. It was originally part of an ancient wetland known as the Dachauer Moos, filled with moors and marshlands, (some parts are still preserved as wetlands).

== History ==
Originally, the area was called "Sleizheim" or "Sliusheim" for centuries. Not until the 19th Century was it divided into an (upper) Oberschleissheim and a (lower) Unterschleissheim for population and political reasons. The small hamlet of Mittenheim lay between the two communities.

There is evidence that the area was inhabited as far back as the Bronze Age and the Roman Age.

The first surviving document in which Schleißheim is mentioned comes from the year 785 AD in which Rihpalt von Slivesheim donated his estate to the diocese of Freising. The hamlet “Schleyßaim” was already a village with several farms as early as the 12th century.

The small church of St. Martin in Mallertshofen is a Romanesque church that was built in the Schleissheim area in the first half of the 13th century.

The community suffered heavy losses during the Thirty Years' War (1618–48).

In 1702 a Franciscan monastery was established in the hamlet of Mittenheim. In the late 19th and early 20th century Mittenheim was the home of German artist Otto Hupp.

During World War II, Oberschleißheim was the location of two subcamps of the Dachau concentration camp.

== Palace Complex ==
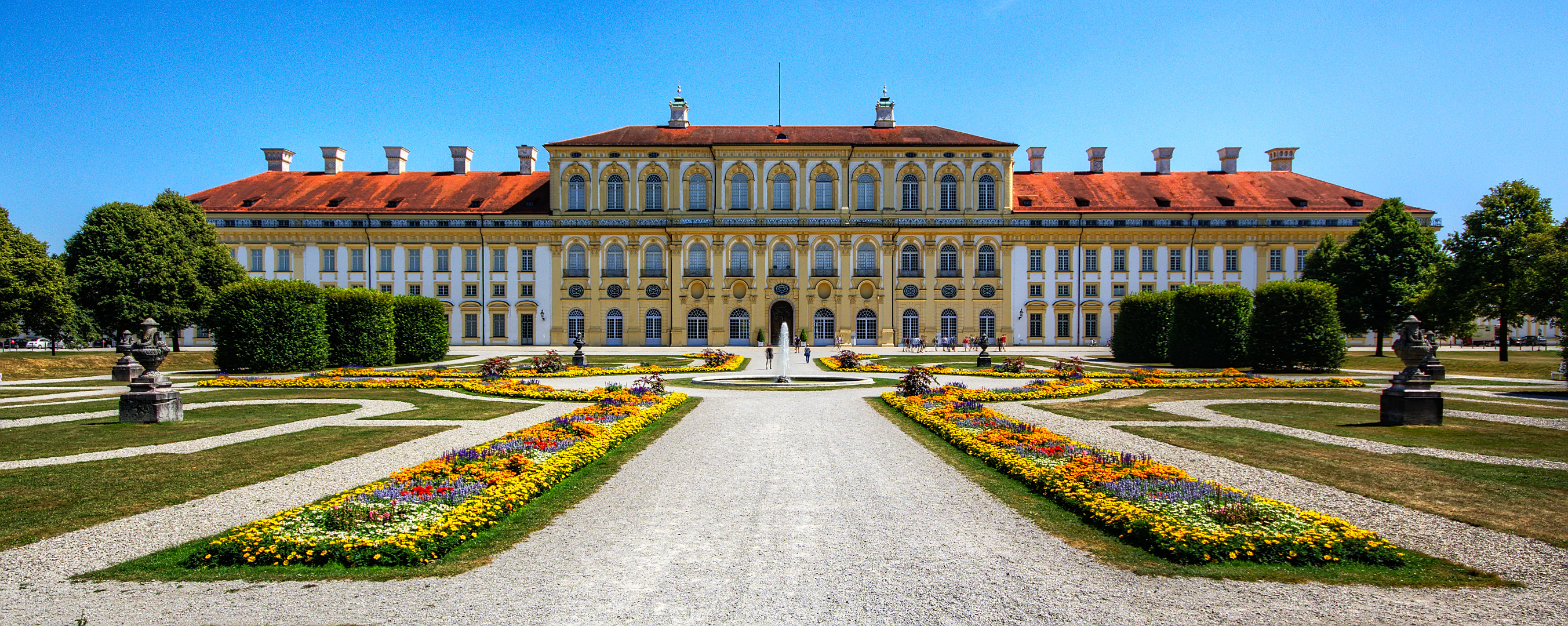
The New Schloss at Oberschleissheim

In the late 1590s, the Duke of Bavaria, William V. built a Renaissance country house (known today as the 'Old Palace') in Schleissheim. The building was extended during the reign of Maximilian I, Elector of Bavaria during the early 1620s.

After the 30-Years-War, the new Elector of Bavaria, Maximilian II Emanuel, wanted to build a palace that would rival the Palace of Versailles near Paris. To do this he first had to build a canal network from the Isar River to the building site, (to transport bricks, lumber and other building material on flat boats). He first built his smaller Lustheim Palace in 1688, and lived there while construction continued on his much larger and grandiose New Palace nearby. Work was stopped during the War of Spanish Succession (1701-1715). The New Palace and its gardens were finally completed in 1726, (but Max Emanuel would die that same year). Afterwards, the Palaces were used as a summer residence for the Bavarian House of Wittelsbach.

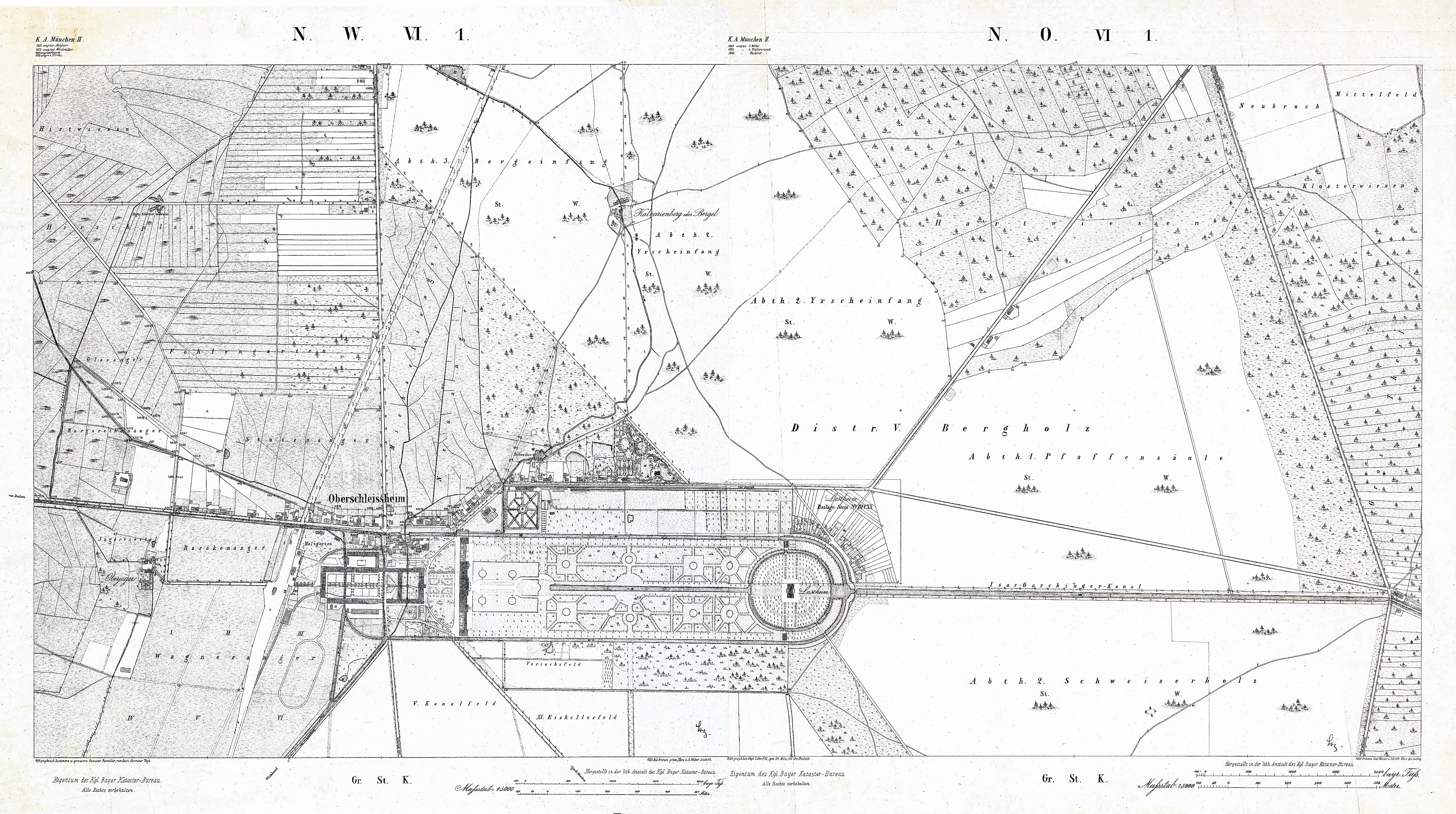
Map of the Palace Complex in Oberschleissheim from 1859/1860

== After the division of the two Schleissheim communities ==
As part of the administrative reforms in Bavaria in 1818, Unterschleissheim became an independent political community, (thus separated from the community of Oberschleissheim with its Palace Complex).

From 1856 to 1858 the first railway line from Munich to Landshut passed through Obererschleissheim. The old station was closed in 1972 and moved to the modern S-Bahn Station about one Kilometer away.

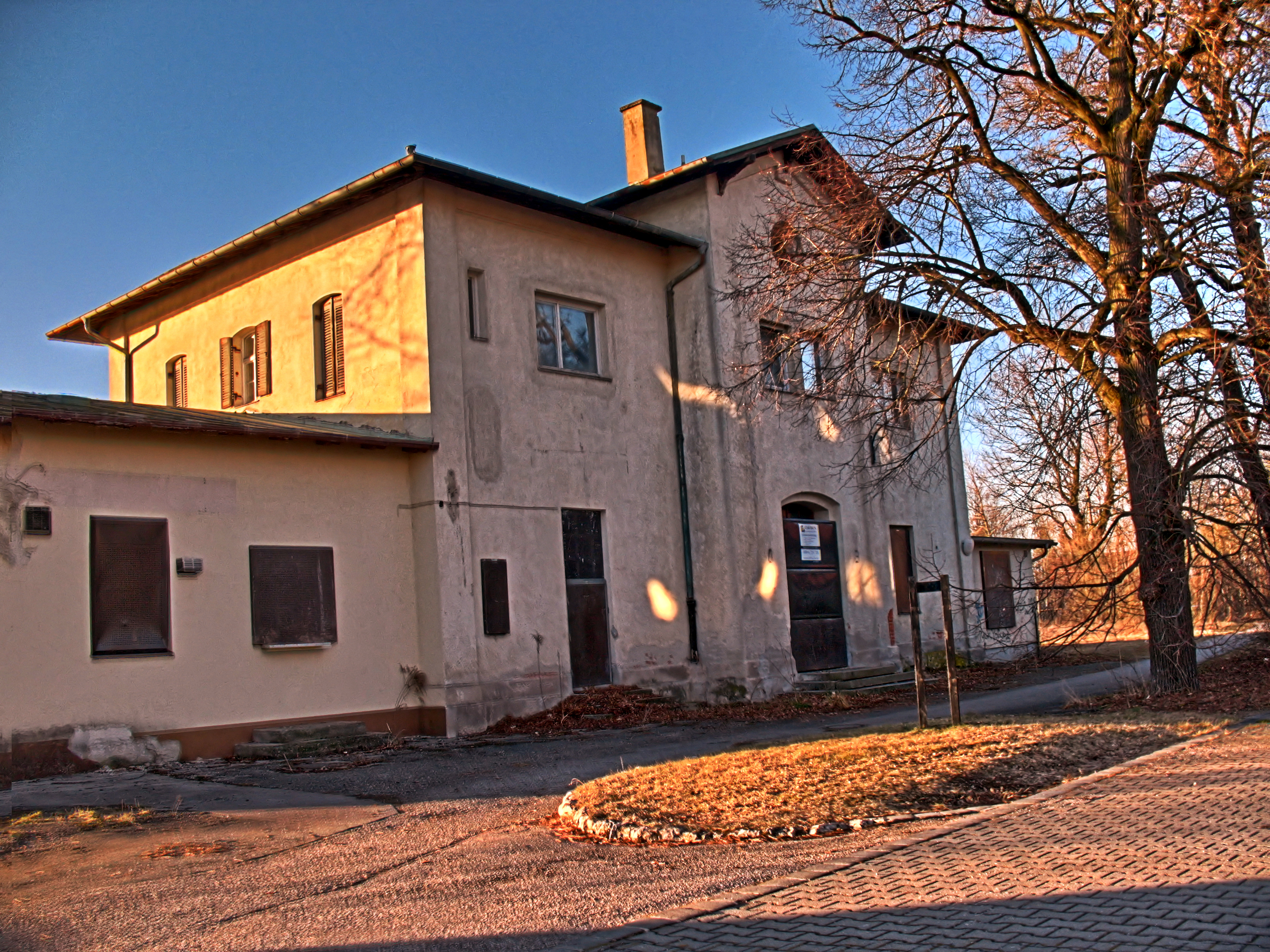
Old train station at Oberschleissheim, built in the 1850s

A church report from 1869 tells that Oberschleißheim had 60 houses, most of which were built on the palace canal leading to Dachau.

In 1912 an airfield was constructed for the Royal Bavarain Flying Corps, next to the Palace Complex. The airfield was the first in Bavaria.

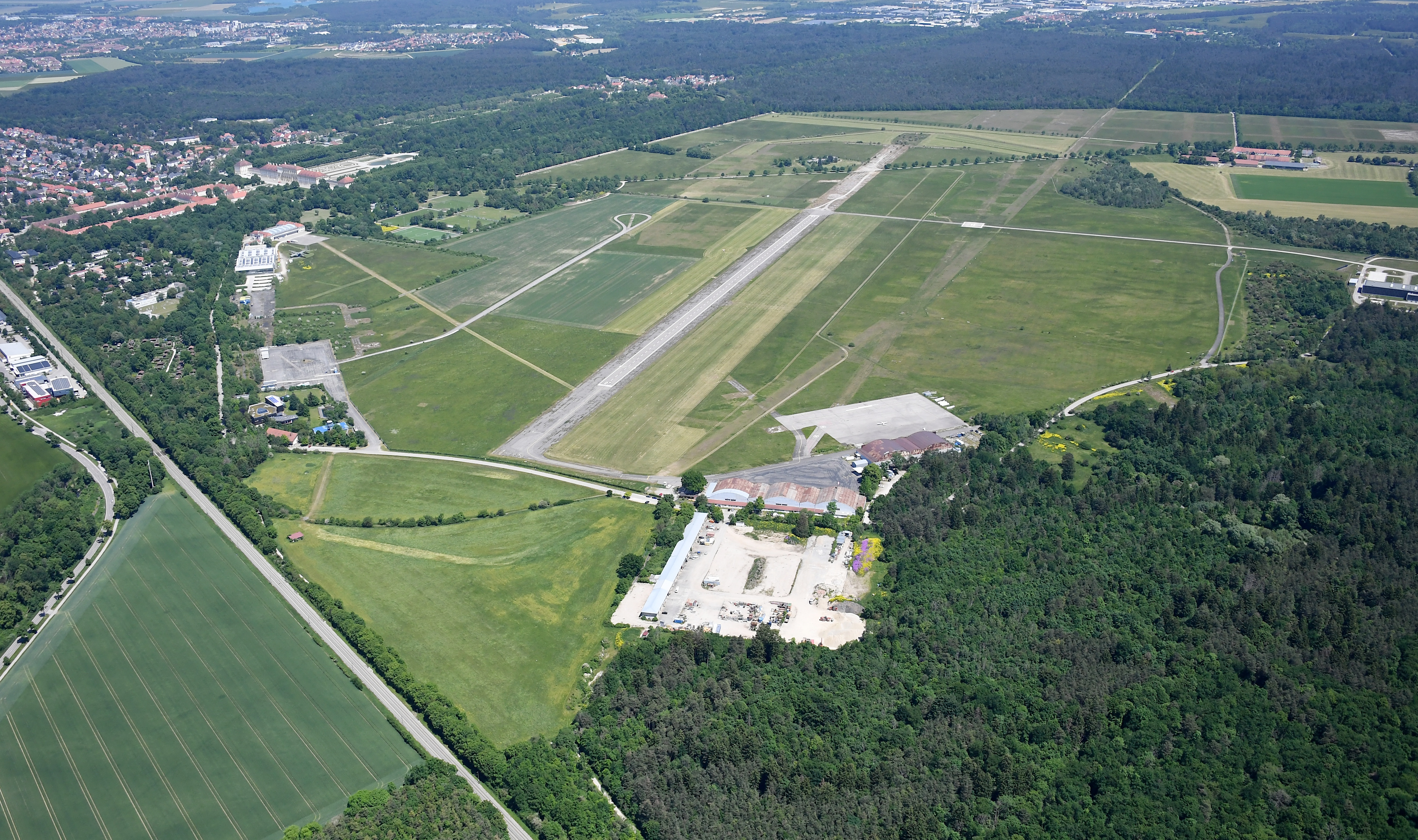
Aerial view of the airfield at Oberschleissheim

In the early 20th century, Schleißheim was home to author Waldemar Bonsels, who wrote his children's book "Biene Maja" in 1912.

During the Second World War, the airfield and Palace Complex were damaged by Allied bombing.

After the war, the population grew dramatically. Many apartment buildings and businesses have been developed since then.

In 1972, a regatta course was built in Oberschleissheim for the 1972 Munich Olympics.

In 1979–1980, the Autobahn (A92) was constructed just west of Oberschleissheim. In the 1990s, Autobahn (A99) passed just south of Oberschleissheim.

== Regatta Course Oberschleißheim ==
In 1972 an artificial canoe sprint and rowing venue was created in Oberschleißheim for the Munich Olympic Summer Games. The course is 2 kilometres (1.2 mi) long and 135 metres (443 ft) wide, and is in regular use. The course is accessible through Munich's public transport and roading network. The stand has capacity for 9,500 spectators.

The venue host many events throughout the year including bungee jumping.

== Flugwerft Schleissheim ==
The airfield and its historic buildings were constructed in 1912 for the Königlich-Bayerische Fliegertruppen (Royal Bavarian Flying Corps). After World War II the Americans used the airfield until the 1970s, then it was given over to the German Air Forces. In the 1980s the airfield has been home to a German Federal Police helicopter squadron. In the early 1990s the historic maintenance hangar was restored and enlarged to accommodate the Deutsches Museum's growing aviation collections. The Museum was opened in 1992. The Museum has many aerospace exhibits. These include various airplanes, helicopters, motors and turbines.

== Additional Facilities ==
Oberschleissheim also is the home to several government facilities. The Bavarian Authority of Health and Food Safety, the Institute for Moor Management, the Federal Office for Radiation Protection and the Faculty of Veterinary Medicine for LMU Munich are housed here. The city also houses the Augustinium Special Education Center for disabled people. The Helmholtz Research Center is located at the southern-most end of Oberschleissheim, at the city limits of Munich.

== See also ==
- Bundesamt für Strahlenschutz
- Nordallianz
- Regattastrecke Oberschleißheim
