= Alliance High School =

Alliance High School may refer to:

== In Iran ==
- Alliance School, Hamadan
- Alliance School, Kermanshah
- Alliance School, Tehran

== In Kenya ==
- Alliance High School (Kenya), Kikuyu
- Alliance Girls High School, Kikuyu

== In the United States ==
- Alliance High School (Ohio), Ohio
- Alliance High School (Oregon), Oregon
- The Alliance School, Milwaukee
