= Flugplatz Schleißheim =

Airport in Bavaria, Germany

Schleißheim Airport Flugplatz Schleißheim
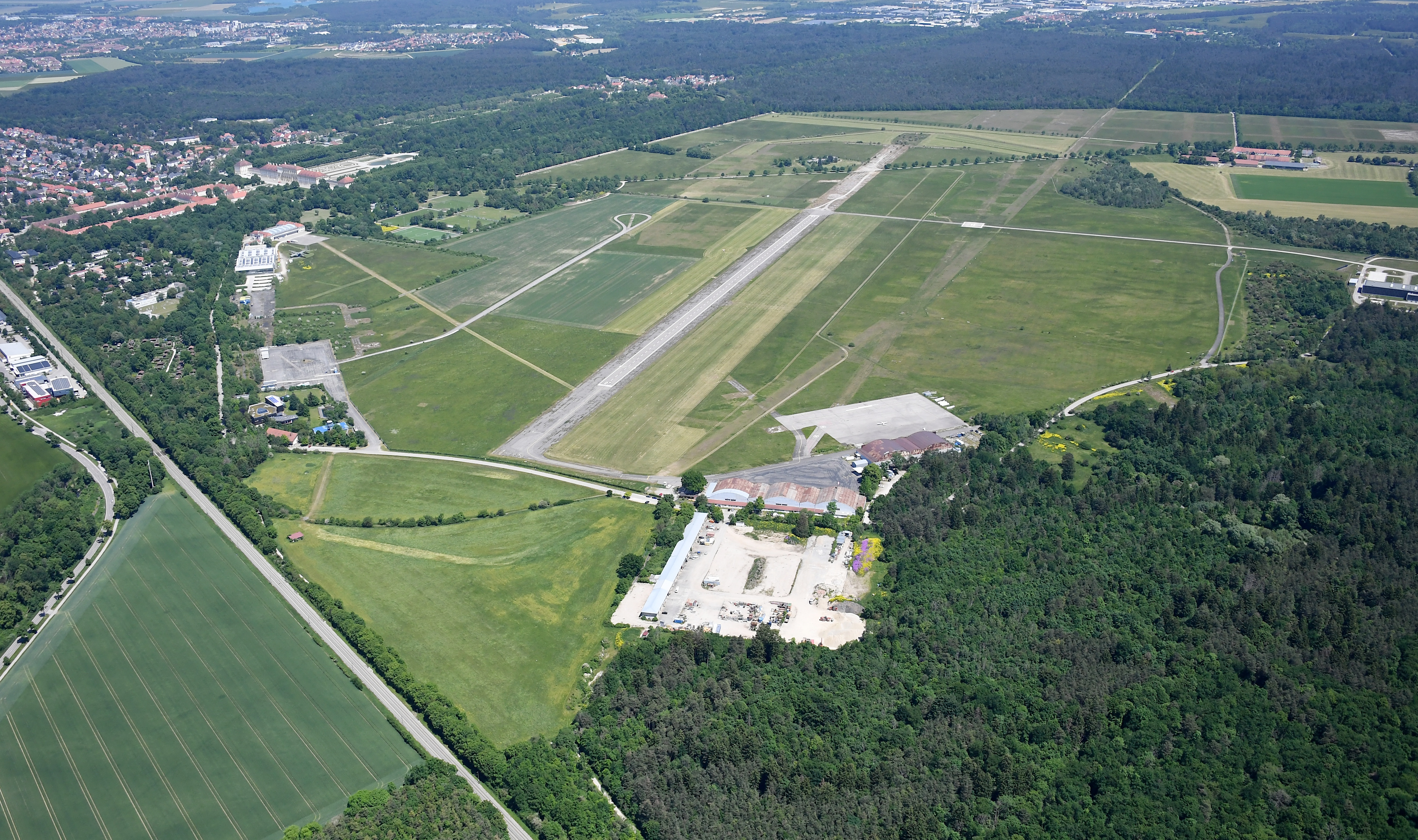
- IATA: none; ICAO: EDNX/EDMX

Summary
- Airport type: Public
- Operator: Flugplatz Schleißheim e.V.
- Location: Oberschleißheim, Germany
- Opened: 1912
- Elevation AMSL: 1,596 ft (486 m)
- Coordinates: 48°14′21″N 011°33′34″E
- Website: https://www.flugplatz-schleissheim.de/

Map
- Location in Bavaria

Runways
Direction	Length		Surface
Direction	m	ft	Surface
07/25	808	2,651	Asphalt

Helipads
Number	Length		Surface
Number	m	ft	Surface
	30x30	98x98	Asphalt
- Source: Schleißheim Flugplatzdaten, EAD

The Flugplatz Schleißheim (ICAO: EDNX) (the part of the site used today as an airfield is called Sonderlandeplatz Oberschleißheim) is an airfield in the Bavarian town of Oberschleißheim near Munich (about 13 km north of the city center), in the Jägerstraße 1. It is the oldest still operating airfield in Germany, which was planned as a military airfield.

== History of the airport ==
The airfield was founded in 1912 for the Royal Bavarian Flying Corps. A subdivision was located at the Gersthofen/Gablingen airfield. Because of the proximity to Schloss Schleißheim, all airfield buildings were built in the "reduced home style".

=== World War I ===
The base was used by the Royal Bavarian Flying Corps throughout the war.

=== Interwar period ===
With the signing of the Armistice of 11 November 1918, the demobilization of the Royal Bavarian Flying Corps commenced. The based was used by aircraft of the Ritter von Epp volunteer corps to support the Freikorps in crushing the Bavarian Soviet Republic in May 1919. Later in 1919 a police squadron was established at Schleißheim. Following the signing of the Treaty of Versailles on 10 January 1920, Germany was demilitarised and the Royal Bavarian Flying Corps was disbanded on 8 May 1920. The police squadron was disbanded by order of the Allies in January 1921.

The airfield was then used for civilian purposes until 1933, initially as a technical base for the beginning civilian air traffic, from 1927 it was mainly used for pilot training as part of the Deutsche Verkehrsfliegerschule to support Germany's rearmament in violation of the Treaty of Versailles.

=== Nazi period and Second World War ===
After the Nazi Party seized power, it was expanded into an air base of the Luftwaffe. The construction measures were planned and supervised by the architects of the so-called Postbauschule. This new architectural style, unusual for the Nazi era, is also known as Bayerische Moderne (Bavarian Modernism). The air traffic control building designed by Robert Vorhoelzer in 1933/34 and demolished in December 2007 represented the archetype of this architectural direction in air force construction.

Jagdfliegerschule Schleißheim was formed on 1 April 1934 at Schleißheim and disbanded again on 9 June 1936. It was recreated again on 1 April 1939 consisting of 3 Staffeln (squadrons). The school was renamed to Jagdfliegerschule 2 on 15 January 1940.

From 1938, the Fliegertechnische Schule Schleißheim (School of Aeronautical Engineering) was built in the southern part of the airfield.

Nachtjagdschule 1 (1st night fighter school) was established at the base in 1941.

From 1939 to 1946 there was a prisoner-of-war camp in the south-eastern area of the airfield. Here under air force supervision French and later Soviet prisoners of war were first accommodated. After the end of the war, the POW camp continued to be used by the US Army, which interned former SS members. In the nearby Gut Hochmutting (estate) there was a subcamp of the Dachau concentration camp with eleven concentration camp prisoners of a bomb disposal squad.

Under the codename Minotaurus, a bunkered control center for day and night fighters for southern Germany was built in 1943. The bunker was blown up in 1971.

=== Post-war period ===
The airfield was occupied by units of the Seventh United States Army on 29 April 1945. The U.S. forces withdrew from the base in February 1946 and detonated the runways.

The accommodation area of the School of Aeronautical Engineering was used from 1945 to about 1953 as Displaced Persons camp Schleißheim (Feldmoching).

In 1947, with the start of the Cold War the airfield was recommissioned and then used primarily as a transport base.

From 1945 to 1947 Airfield R.75, according to the Allied code designation, was used for military purposes by the Occupation Air Force (OAF) of the U.S. Army of Occupation, respectively the United States Air Forces in Europe (USAFE) and from 1947 to 1973. On 31 May 1973 the base was officially returned to the Federal Republic of Germany.

The base was also used by Army Airmen of the Bundeswehr from 1958 to 1981. Thereafter the military use of the airfield ended.

In 1964 the Bundesgrenzschutz-Fliegerstaffel Süd (Southern Border Guard Squadron), established in Rosenheim in 1962, moved to Schleißheim. In 1981 the squadron took over the hangars abandoned by the Bundeswehr. In 1965/66 a Hawk battery of the French 402e RAA (régiment d'artillerie anti-aérienne) was briefly stationed in Schleißheim.

For a short time, the second Munich intensive transport helicopter operated jointly by the ADAC and the BRK (Bavarian Red Cross) was stationed here.

=== Federal Police ===
In the area used by the Federal Police, an approximately 350-metre-long new building was erected after the demolition of hangar 4. In addition to operation according to visual flight rules, flight operations according to instrument flight rules with corresponding instrument landing procedures were approved for exclusive use by the federal police helicopters. A Radio Mandatory Zone was set up for this purpose. The helicopter landing pad is designated as a separate aerodrome, Oberschleißheim Heliport (ICAO: EDMX).

=== Present ===
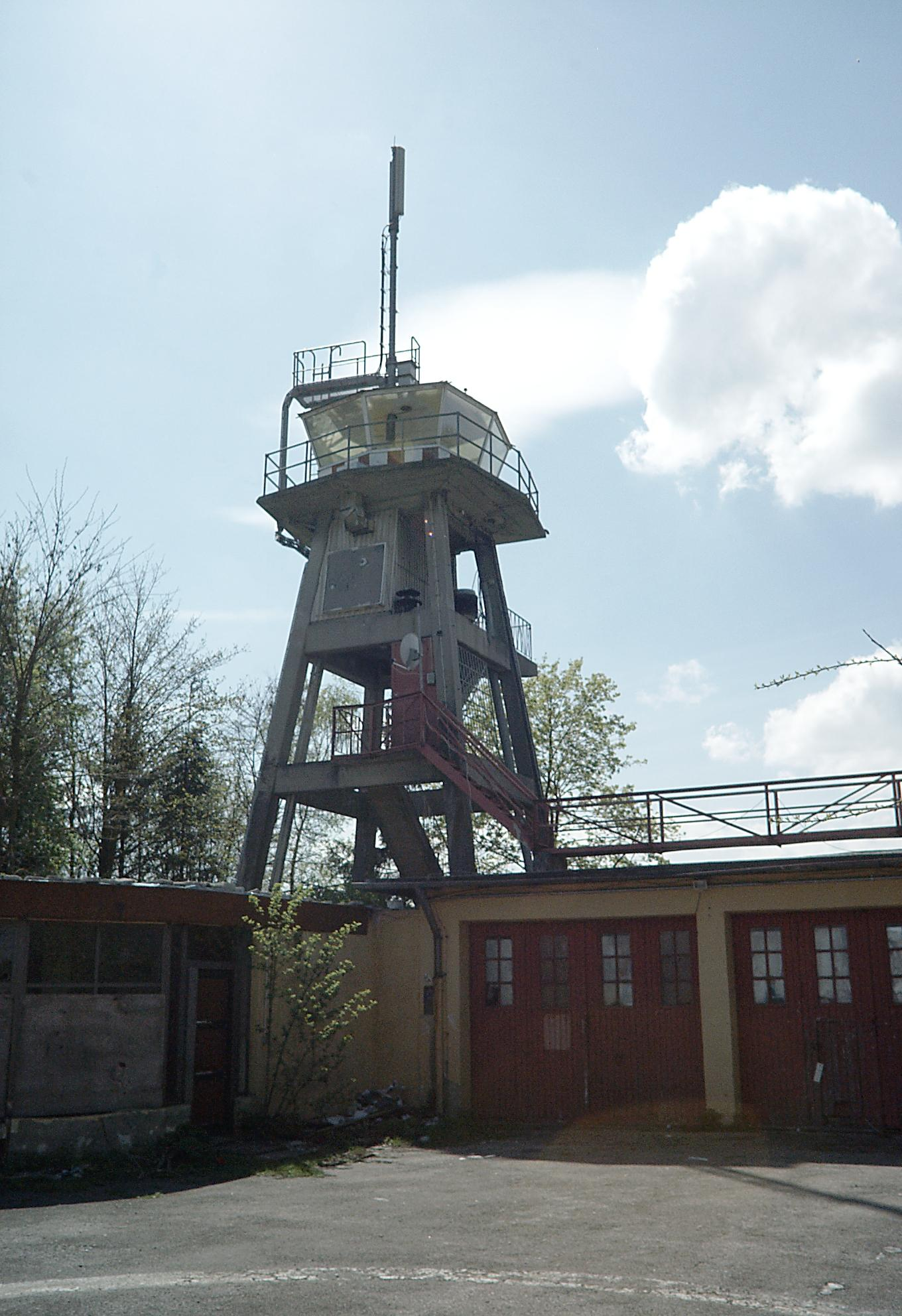
The former tower of the airfield in the state of construction before 2008, fundamentally rebuilt in the following year

The airfield is used today by six air sports clubs and the Oberschleißheim Federal Police Air Squadron. The actual operator of the special airfield is Flugplatz Schleißheim e. V., which was formed in 2001 as the umbrella organization of the six flying clubs. In the historical context, the Verein zur Erhaltung der historischen Flugwerft e. V. (association for the preservation of an historical airplane hangar) Der Werftverein (airfield maintenance association) is a member, with a focus on the restoration of aircraft engines and the Bayerischen-Flugzeug-Historiker e. V. with a focus on aviation history. From time to time, the Zeppelin NT and the Junkers Ju 52 stop at the airfield, which serves as a base for sightseeing flights over Munich. Only the Flugwerft Schleißheim and the two Junkershallen are listed.

=== Future ===
South of the new building of the Federal Police, following the demolition of Hangars 1 to 3, another new building for the Flight Squadron of the Bavarian State Police was to be built on the basis of an airworthiness permit. After a successful complaint of the municipality Oberschleißheim this project was stopped. A zoning procedure must now be carried out.

== Name ==
From the foundation in 1912 until the withdrawal of the US armed forces in 1973, the terms Flugplatz/Fliegerhorst Schleissheim or Schleissheim Army Airfield were common. The Bundeswehr introduced the name Flugplatz Oberschleißheim, which is officially still valid today. In general usage, however, Flugplatz Schleißheim is common again.

== Flight days ==
In the years 1985 and 1987 public flight days took place on the area. The British Aerobatics Squadron of the Royal Air Force Red Arrows performed at the 1985 Flying Day; the last flying day in September 1987 took place under the patronage of the Bavarian Prime Minister Franz Josef Strauss.

Flugplatz Schleißheim is located on the edge of Munichs Airport control zone. Due to the changed airspace structure in connection with the major airport in Erdinger Moos, which was opened in 1992, the classification of the site as a landscape conservation area or later as an FFH area and a change in traffic development, no further major air show days with an aerobatic programme, in particular aerobatic squadrons, were possible. The catastrophic air accident in 1988 at an air show in Ramstein had no influence.

In May 2003, thousands of onlookers and flight enthusiasts were drawn to the site when the Flugwerft organised an airfield festival with flight demonstrations of individual aircraft from different epochs of aviation.

The last big "Fly in" with historic aircraft took place in 2012 on the occasion of the 100th anniversary of the airfield. Since 2012, the Werftverein of the Deutsches Museum has organised an annual Air Show in July, which is also featured in the Deutsches Museum announcements.

== Deutsches Museum Flugwerft Schleißheim ==
On 18 September 1992, a branch of the Deutsches Museum was opened on the grounds of the airfield. This branch is called Deutsches Museum Flugwerft Schleissheim and is partly located in the restored buildings from the time of the Royal Bavarian Air Force. South of the new museum hall, the Deutsches Museum planned to build a new central depot in 2009. This plan has since been abandoned and the central depot will be built in the Aufhausen industrial estate near Erding.

== Memorial and youth meeting place ==
Until 2008, the airport was home to the Flucht und Vertreibung (flight and expulsion) memorial erected on the initiative of the Federation of Expellees and inaugurated on 19 July 1984 in the presence of Franz Josef Strauß. The memorial site consisted of the last preserved pioneer landing boat type 41, which brought thousands of refugees across the Baltic Sea between Pillau and Hela in 1945, a memorial wall with panels and glass bricks with earth from twenty places of origin of the expellees, and a bell tower with two bells from 1622 and 1652 from the church in Kiwitten in Warmia. A bronze plaque stated: "The victims of the expulsion." Eleven commemorative plaques commemorated, among other things, the role of the Wehrmacht in the evacuation of the civilian population. For example, the sixth plaque read: "Soldiers of the 24th Panzer Division - formerly the 1st East Prussian Cavalry Division - fought for their homeland and for the rescue of refugees from East Prussia until their downfall".

The monument was desecrated in 2008 because of its condition and the site was sold to the Landkreis München. After the demolition of the building stock, a youth meeting place for the German-Polish youth exchange was established on the site, which was operated by the Kreisjugendring München-Land. The former Mahnmal Flucht und Vertreibung (flight and expulsion memorial) was rearranged by a German-Polish commission.
