= Return to Castle Grailskull =

Studio album by Grailknights
- Released: 7 August 2006
- Recorded: 2006
- Genre: Death metal, melodic death metal, power metal
- Length: 49:31
- Label: STF-Records

Grailknights chronology
Across the Galaxy (2004)	Return to Castle Grailskull (2006)	Alliance (2008)

Professional ratings
Review scores
Source	Rating
BurnYourEars	8/10
Metal.de	5/10
Rock Hard	3/10

Return to Castle Grailskull is the second full-length album by German metal band Grailknights. The album was released on 7 August 2006.

== Track listing ==
No.	Title	Length
1.	"Raving Storms"	5:21
2.	"Hail to the Grail"	8:19
3.	"Moonlit Masquerade"	6:06
4.	"Fight Until You Die"	3:52
5.	"Home at Last"	6:30
6.	"Prevail"	5:30
7.	"Return to Castle Grailskull"	7:27
8.	"Home at Last (German version) (hidden track)"	6:26
Total length:		49:31

== Personnel ==
- Sir Optimus Prime – vocals, guitars
- Lord Lightbringer – vocals, guitars
- Mac Death – vocals, bass
- Duke of Drumington – drums
