= Alliance School, Tehran =

First Alliance Israélite Universelle school in Iran (est. 1898)

Alliance school Tehran (Persian: مدرسه آلیانس تهران), also known as Etehad school, was the first Alliance Israélite Universelle school built in Iran. Located in the capital Tehran and founded in 1898, it was the first western style school in Iran, and is still open today.

Alliance organization had a great role in improving the situation of Iranian Jews, thus some Jews regarded its representatives as Messiah (Christ) or the Jews' promised saviour.

== History ==
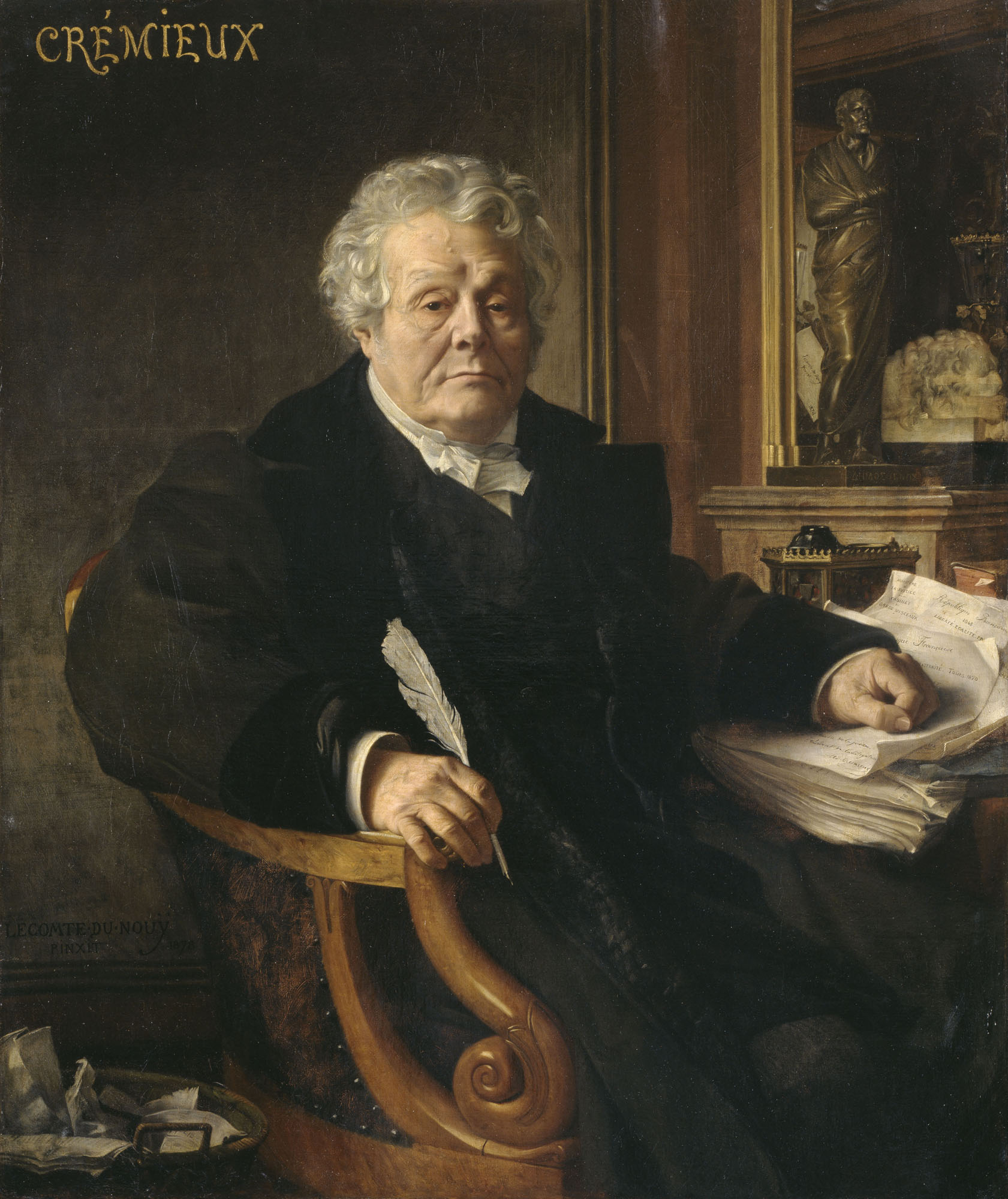
French politician Adolphe Crémieux, founder of the Alliance

Alliance schools were established by "Alliance Israélite Universelle" an international Jewish organization founded in 1860 in Paris. In every city Alliance established either a school, a committee, a guild, or a library. At the beginning of twentieth century, in France, and other countries such as United States, Australia, Russia, Belgium, Italy, Egypt and Turkey there were a total of 126 Alliance committees.

Naser al-Din Shah Qajar — one of the shahs of Qajar dynasty — travelled to Europe in 1873. In this journey, Adolphe Crémieux director of Alliance Israelite universelle had a meeting with the Shah and presented him with details of the problems Iranian Jews were facing. Naser al-Din Shah Qajar approved the establishment of school by Alliance and to eliminate the religious anti-Jewish laws. Next day Alliance wrote a formal letter to Iran's Prime minister, Mirza Hosein Khan Sepahsalar to demand the establishment of Alliance school. Mirza Hosein Khan Sepahsalar officially accepted the demand. Despite the plans to build the school in 1873, due to objections by the people and other problems the start of work was proponed. Inside Iran, Joseph Désiré Tholozan, Naser al-Din Shah Qajar's private doctor was assigned to this job. It was in 1889 that, for the first time, there were talks of establishing Alliance committee branches in Tehran and in Shiraz.

The first Alliance school opened in Tehran in 1898, 25 years after the contract with Naser al-Din Shah Qajar. Members of Tehran's Jewish community welcomed Alliance's representative. This representative terminated the special patching Jews should have on their clothes. It was an innovation for the Muslim majority of Iranian populace when apart from a boys school Alliance attempted to open a school for girls.

Alliance spent little concern on Jewish religious rites and rather concentrated on modern scientific issues. This worried many Jewish parents from sending their children to this school. During the reign of Reza Shah, this school became non-governmental and went under the control of Iran's Ministry of Education. School changed name from Alliance to Etehad.

== See also ==
- Alliance School, Hamadan
- Alliance School, Kermanshah
- History of the Jews in Iran

== Sources ==
- Netzer, A. (1985). "ALLIANCE ISRAÉLITE UNIVERSELLE". Encyclopaedia Iranica, Vol. I, Fasc. 8. pp. 893–895.
