= Northern Alliance (disambiguation) =

Northern Alliance can mean any of the following:

- The Northern Alliance, a regional network of political activists that originated in the Lombardy, Lega Nord
- The Afghan Northern Alliance, a military-political umbrella organization in Afghanistan
  - The National Resistance Front of Afghanistan also known as the Panjshir resistance, commonly considered to be the modern Northern Alliance
- The Northern Alliance (Myanmar), a coalition of ethnic insurgent groups in Myanmar
- The Northern Alliance Radio Network, an American radio talk show hosted by bloggers in Minneapolis and Saint Paul, Minnesota
- Northern Football Alliance, an English football competition
- Nordallianz: a group of German towns situated between the city of Munich and Munich Airport
- The Ōuetsu Reppan Dōmei, sometimes referred to in English as the Northern Alliance, a short-lived Japanese military-political coalition during the Boshin War
- The National Farmers' Alliance, a US Farmers' Alliance
- The Anti-Swedish alliance, during the Great Northern War, led by Denmark–Norway, Tsardom of Russia and Electorate of Saxony
