= Tolniki Wielkie =

- Village
- Location within Poland
- Coordinates: 54°3′N 20°41′E
- Country: Poland
- Voivodeship: Warmian-Masurian
- County: Lidzbark
- Gmina: Kiwity
- Population: 220

Tolniki Wielkie [tɔlˈniki ˈvjɛlkʲɛ] is a village in the administrative district of Gmina Kiwity, within Lidzbark County, Warmian-Masurian Voivodeship, in northern Poland.
