= Muscle Bound for Glory =

Studio album by Grailknights
- Released: 25 February 2022
- Recorded: 2021
- Genre: Melodic death metal, power metal
- Length: 48:56
- Label: Intono

Grailknights chronology
Knightfall (2018)	Muscle Bound for Glory (2022)	Forever (2025)

Professional ratings
Review scores
Source	Rating
At Boundary's Edge	4/5
The Dark Melody	8.6/10
Metal Hammer	3.5/7
Silence Music Magazine	9/10
Time for Metal	9.5/10

Muscle Bound for Glory is the sixth full-length album by German power metal band Grailknights. The album was released on 25 February 2022, through Intono Records.

== Track listing ==
No.	Title	Length
1.	"Muscle Bound for Glory" (featuring Thomas Winkler)	3:55
2.	"40509"	3:45
3.	"Turbo Boost" (featuring Jon Carter and Benjamin Metzner (Feuerschwanz))	3:35
4.	"Legions of Heroes"	4:07
5.	"Cybone One" (featuring Nadine Wolfarth)	4:14
6.	"Lights"	5:14
7.	"Pinball Death Machine"	3:47
8.	"Powaa!!!" (featuring Jon Carter and Nadine Wolfarth)	4:46
9.	"Gojira" (featuring Yuri)	3:56
10.	"Skyward Thunder Punch"	3:19
11.	"Fall of a Kingdom"	3:56
12.	"The Holy Grail"	4:26
Total length:		49:00

== Personnel ==
- Sir Optimus Prime – lead vocals, acoustic guitar, synthesizers, orchestration
- Count Cranium – guitars, bass, backing vocals
- Sovereign Storm – guitars, backing vocals
- Duncan MacLoud – bass, backing vocals
- Lord Drumcules – drums
