= Otto Friedrich von der Groeben =

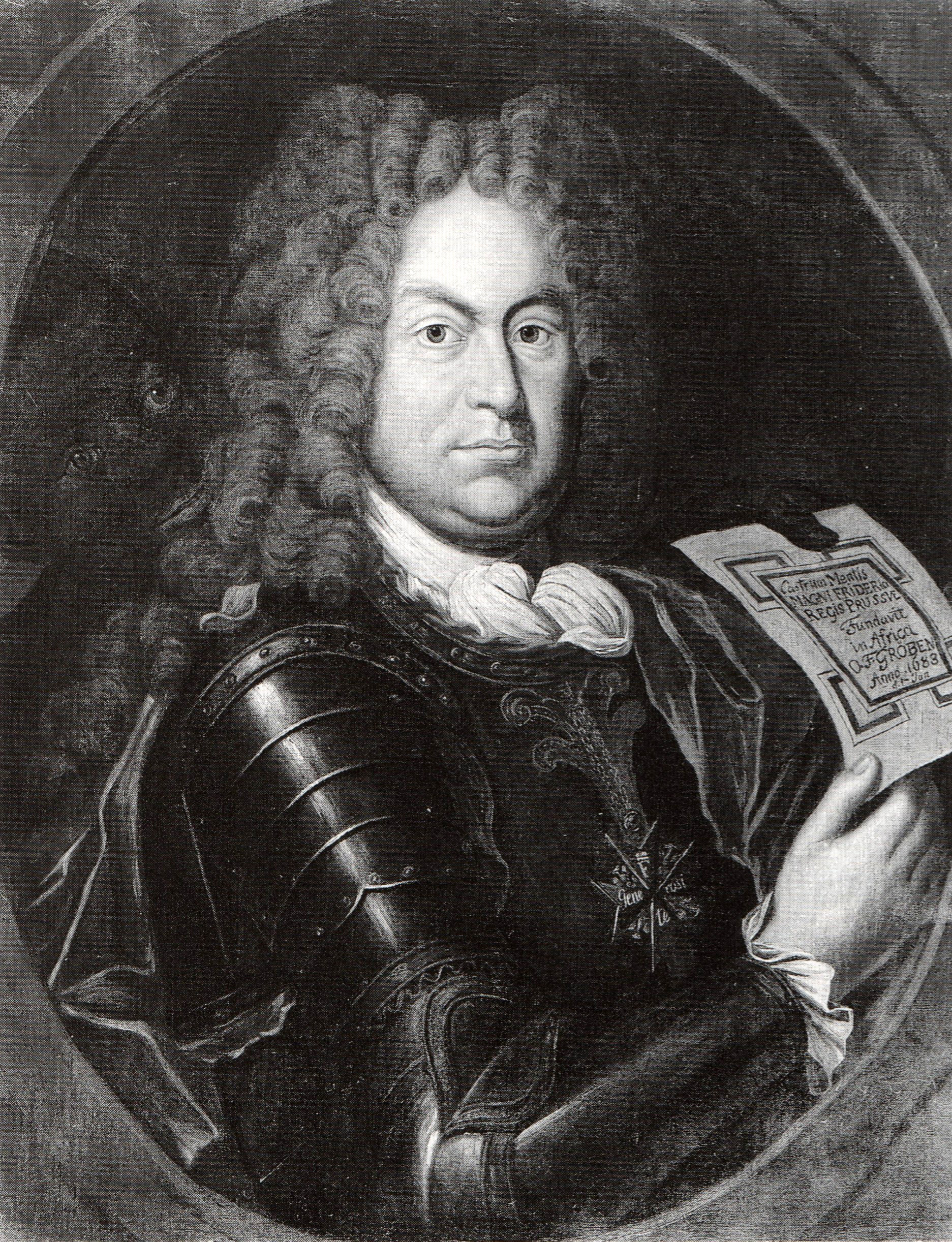
- Otto Friedrich von der Groeben, 1700
- Born: April 16, 1657; Napraty, Prince-Bishopric of Warmia
- Died: June 30, 1728 (aged 71)
- Buried: Kwidzyn Cathedral, Kwidzyn
- Allegiance: Margraviate of Brandenburg; Republic of Venice; Polish–Lithuanian Commonwealth
- Rank: Lieutenant general
- Conflicts: Great Turkish War

Otto Friedrich von der Groeben (16 April 1657 – 30 June 1728) was a Brandenburg-Prussia explorer, officer and Polish lieutenant general.

== Biography ==
Von der Groeben was born in Napraty in the Prince-Bishopric of Warmia in the Kingdom of Poland to the General Georg Heinrich von der Groeben. He started a journey through Italy, Malta, Egypt, Palestine and Cyprus in the age of 17 and returned in 1680.

After Philipp Pietersen Blonck, a sailor in Prussian service, had landed at the Cape Three Points (modern Ghana) and signed a treaty of friendship with the local Ahanta chiefs Pregate, Sophonie and Apany in 1680, the Brandenburg African Company was founded in 1681 and a new expedition was organised. In 1682 Frederick William, Elector of Brandenburg assigned von der Groeben the command of a colonial expedition of Brandenburg, which was supposed to acquire a colony on the coast of Guinea. The small fleet of the Brandenburg Navy consisted of the Morian (32 guns, 60-man crew) and the Churprinz von Brandenburg (12 guns, 40-man crew) and set sail on 16 May 1682.

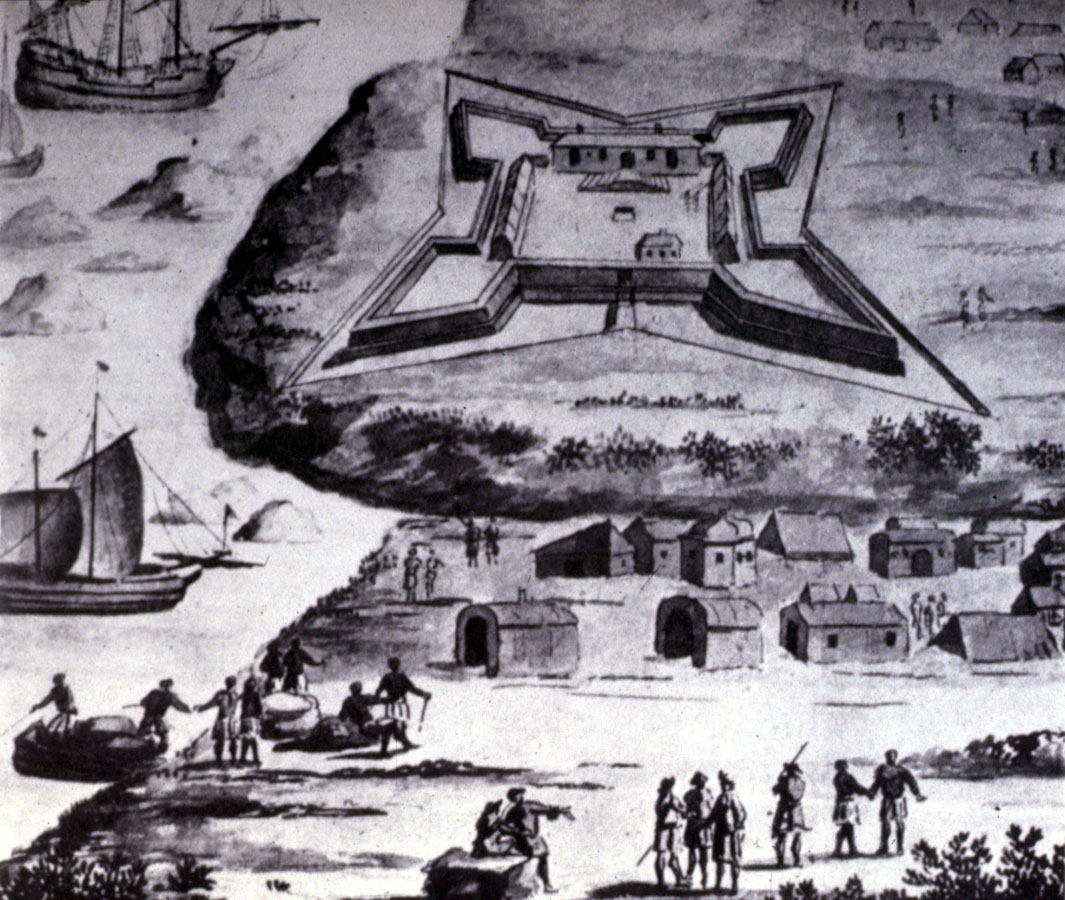
The Fortress of Gross Friedrichsburg

They arrived near the village of Accada on 27 December 1682, hoisted the flag of Brandenburg on 1 January 1683 near the modern Princes Town and began to build a fortification, which they called Fort Groß Friedrichsburg. On 5 January 1683, the treaty with the Ahanta was renewed.

The garrison suffered from diseases and von der Groeben sickened of tropical fever. He passed the command of the fortress to Philipp Pietersen Blonck and returned to Prussia in the summer of 1683.

In honour of the foundation of the first colony of Brandenburg, he was awarded the prospective entitlement of the Amtshauptmann of Marienwerder (Kwidzyn) und Riesenburg (Prabuty) in succession to that of his father.

In 1686 von der Groeben joined Venetian service and fought against Turkish troops at Morea. On 3 January 1688 he was promoted to oberst in the Prussian Army, then in 1704, made a Royal Prussian Kammerherr.

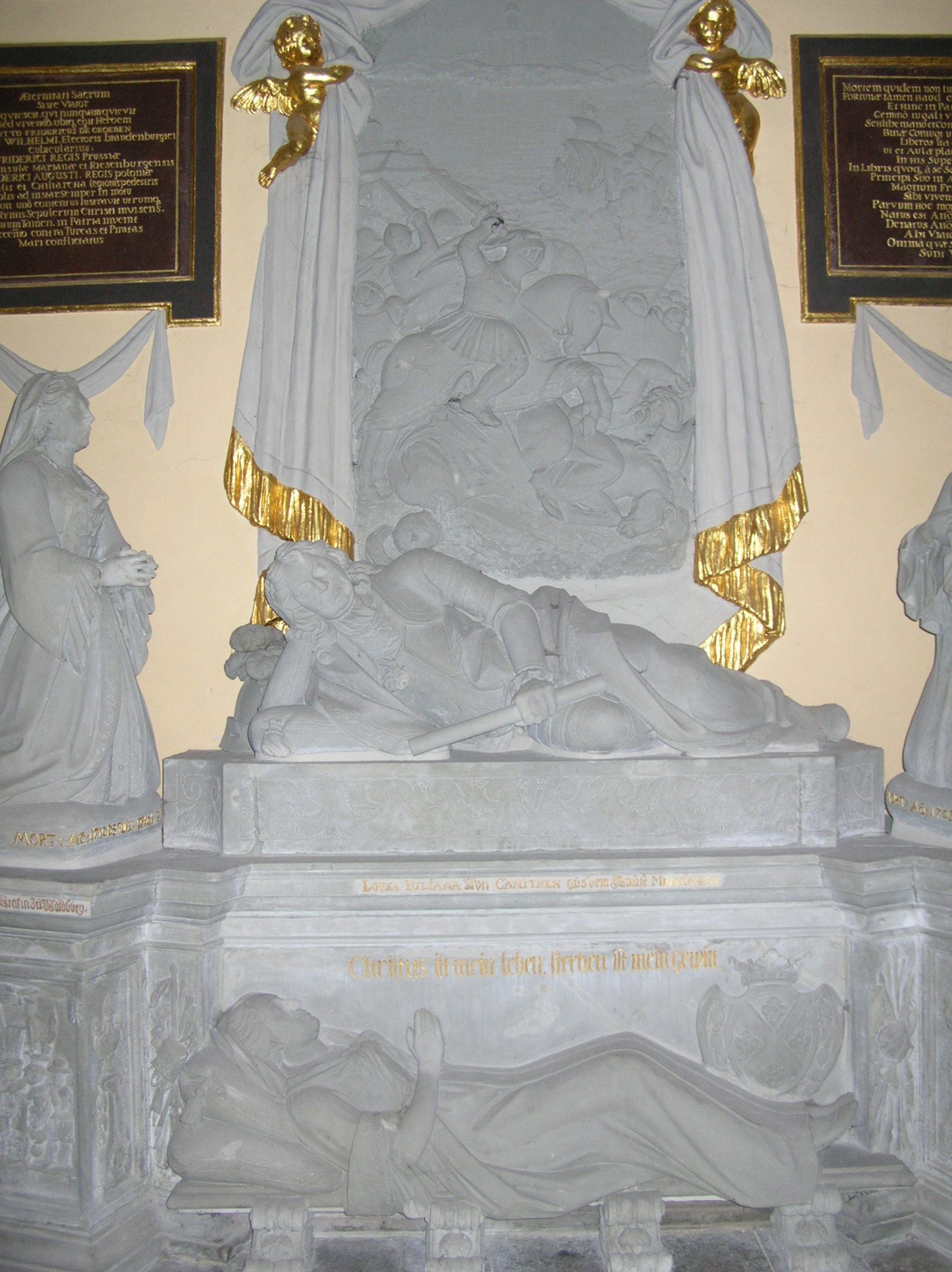
Epitaph of Otto Friedrich von der Groeben at Kwidzyn Cathedral

In 1719 von der Groeben joined the Polish army and was promoted to major general, then lieutenant general.

Von der Groeben was married three times and had 20 children. He died on 30 January 1728 at his estates near Marienwerder (Kwidzyn).

== Publications ==
- Orientalische Reise-Beschreibung, des brandenburgischen Pilgers Otto Friedrich von der Gröben: Nebst d. Brandenburgischen Schifffahrt nach Guinea und der Verrichtung zu Morea, unter ihrem Titel, Marienwerder 1694
- Guineische Reise-Beschreibung, Marienwerder 1694
- Des edlen Bergone und seiner tugendhafften Areteen denckwürdige Lebens- und Liebesgeschichte : Zum Nutz u.Vergnügen edeler Gemüther ... welche daraus die Sitten und Gebräuche vieler Völcker u.d. ausführliche Beschreibung Italien, der Heiligen u. anderer Länder ersehen können., Datzig 1700
- Voorname Scheepsogt Van Jonkheer Otho Fridrich van der Greuben, Brandenburgs Edelman, Na Guinea, Met 2 Keur-Vorstelijke Fregatten, Gedaan in het Jaar 1682... : Verhandelende ... de gelegentheeden van verscheyde Zee-Kusten in Africa ... der Greyn-kust, Tand- of Quaqua-kust, Goud-kust ..., en des Reysigers Togt van daar na Terra Nova in America gelegen : Als mede den Aart, Zeeden, Gewoontens, ...; Door den Reysiger selfs opgeteeknet en nu ... uyt het Hoogduyts vertald; Met ... Register en Konst-Printen... enthalten in: Johan Lodewyk Gottfried, De Aanmerkens-waardige Voyagien Door Francoisen, Italiaanen, Deenen, Hoogduytsen en andere Vreemde Volkeren gedaan Na Oost- en West-Indien... Het 2.Stuk, Leiden 1706

== Literature ==
- Otto Friedrich von der Gröben, Guineische Reisebeschreibung, Marienwerder 1694; reprint 1981
- Paul Friedrich Stuhr: Geschichte der See- und Kolonialmacht des Großen Kurfürsten, Berlin (1839)
- Hofmeister, Die maritimen und colonialen Bestrebungen des Grossen Kurfürsten 1640 bis 1688 - II., Archiv für Post und Telegraphie (Berlin), 13 (1885) 591-603
- Kurt Petsch, Seefahrt für Brandenburg-Preussen 1650-1850 - Geschichte der Seegefechte, überseeischen Niederlassungen und staatlichen Handelskompanien, in: H.Bleckwenn (Hrsg.), Das altpreussische Heer - Erscheinungsbild und Wesen 1713-1807, Teil IV, Band 11, Biblio Verlag Osnabrück, 1986
- Ulrich van der Heyden: Rote Adler an Afrikas Küste. Die brandenburgisch-preußische Kolonie Großfriedrichsburg in Westafrika, Selignow-Verlag, Berlin, 2001, ISBN 3-933889-04-9
