= Maków, Warmian-Masurian Voivodeship =

Maków
- Village
- Location within Poland
- Coordinates: 54°2′23″N 20°39′4″E
- Country: Poland
- Voivodeship: Warmian-Masurian
- County: Lidzbark
- Gmina: Kiwity

Maków ([ˈmakuf]; German: Makohlen) is a village in the administrative district of Gmina Kiwity, within Lidzbark County, Warmian-Masurian Voivodeship, in northern Poland.

== History ==
The original settlement was granted town rights in 1421, under the Chełmo Law by Janusz I, the Duke of Mazovia. Development of the town was mainly funded through market stall license fees and profits form the bath house, cropping house, and weigh house.

The town thrived in the beginning of the 16th century, serving as a seat for nobility and hosted the municipal court and the territory dispute court. Maków's success was due by large part to their proximity to Lithuania serving as a trading post. Furs, wax, leather, corn, wood, and forest fruit passed from Lithuania to western Europe, and fabrics, jewels and wine was traded eastward.

During the 17th century, Maków experienced a total collapse. In 1620 a fire broke out that destroyed the town. Additionally, the war with Sweden between 1655 and 1660, left the town in ruins with only 150 residents remaining. Although there were efforts to reconstruct the town another big fire erupted in 1787 destroying half the town.

After the partition of Poland, Maków was passed under many different jurisdictions. First it was annexed by Prussia from 1795 to 1807. Then it was incorporated into the Duchy of Warsaw from 1807 to 1815. In 1815 came under Russian Rule (Congress Poland). Finally in 1918, the town came back under Polish authority after the newly independent Poland was established.

In World War I, Maków was the site of many battles that destroyed a major part of the town.

During World War II, the town again suffered the ravages of war. Upon the German invasion of Poland in 1939, the town was Annexed by Nazi Germany and through the war about 90% of the town was destroyed again.

=== Jewish History ===
In the 16th century a Jewish community was established in Maków that was connected to the congregation in Ciechanów. The Jewish congregation in Maków operated a synagogue, a ritual bath, an old people's house, and a cemetery. In 1753, the Jewish community of Maków became independent.

Maków Jews established tanneries, mills, and weaving plants in the 19th century. In the late 19th century and early 20th century, Maków supporters of the Zionist movement emereged from the Jewish Population. Branches of the Lovers of Zion and the “Mizrachi” Zionist Orthodox Organization were established In Maków and in 1930 a district convention of the Zionist Organization. The future leader of the Zionist movement, Nachum SokoŁów, moved to Maków in 1876.

Before the invasion of the Germans the wave antisemitism had reached Maków in the 1930's where Jewish shops were boycotted, shop windows broken, and owners harassed. Upon the invasion of the Nazis, the Jewish population was forced into ghettos and forced labor camps. The surviving Jews were sent to Auschwitz-Birkenau, the biggest Nazi extermination camp. The population of 3000 Jews of Maków was entirely wiped out, which was ultimately the same fate suffered by hundreds of Jewish communities in Poland during the Holocaust.

A book titled Memorial Book of the Community of Maków-Mazowiecki was published in Israel in 1969 by J. Brat. It is a compilation of memories and historical accounts, written in Hebrew and Yiddish, and spans 505 pages. The material has been made accessible by JewishGen, Inc. and the Yizkor Book Project. The book provides insights into the life of the Jewish community, including its establishments, culture, and the challenges faced throughout history.
