= Żegoty =

- Village
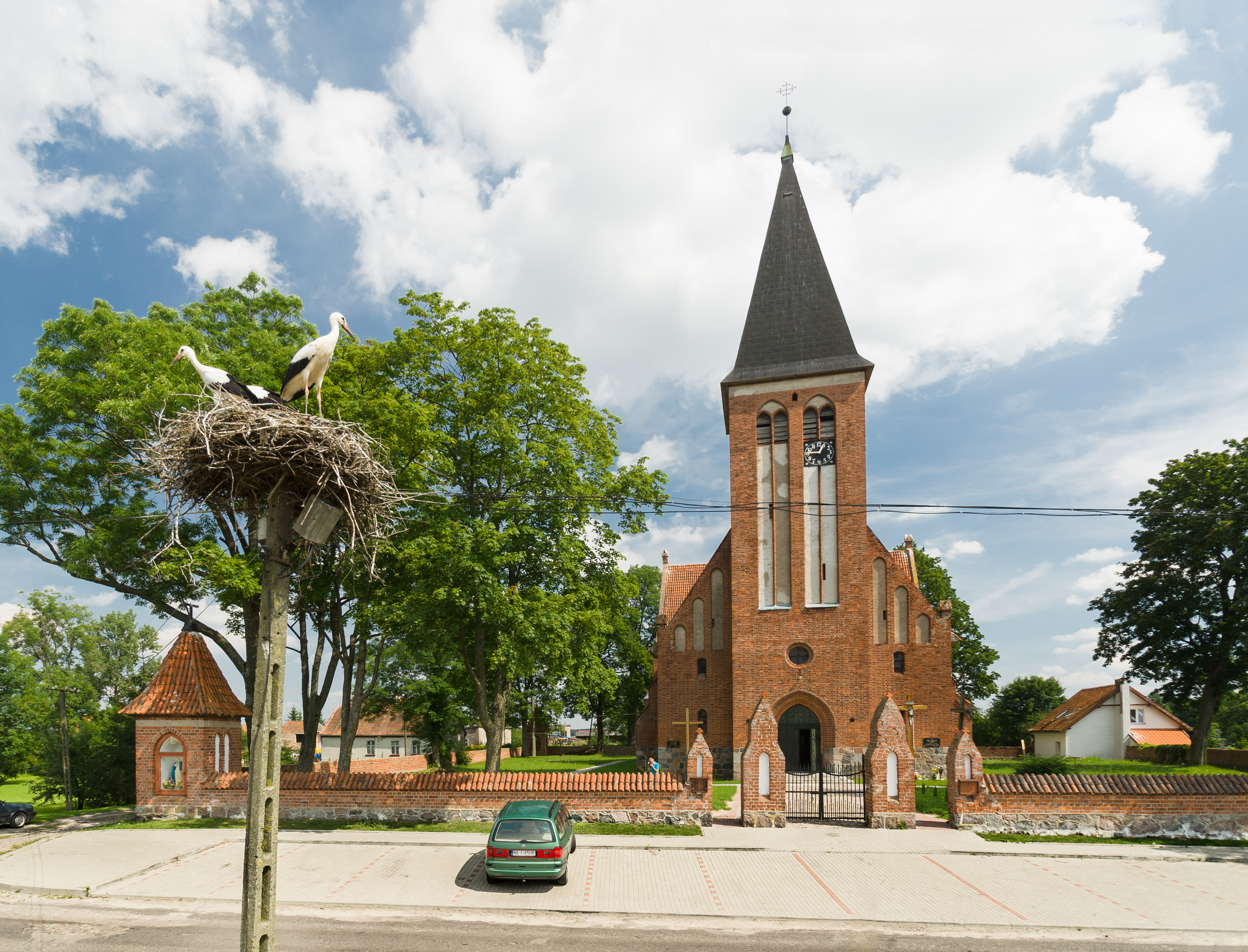

- Location within Poland
- Coordinates: 54°2′N 20°41′E
- Country: Poland
- Voivodeship: Warmian-Masurian
- County: Lidzbark
- Gmina: Kiwity
- Population (approx.): 400

Żegoty [ʐɛˈɡɔtɨ] is a village in the administrative district of Gmina Kiwity, within Lidzbark County, Warmian-Masurian Voivodeship, in northern Poland.

To the southwest of the village lies the Jezioro Blanki lake.
