= Krekole =

- Village
- Location within Poland
- Coordinates: 54°11′N 20°46′E
- Country: Poland
- Voivodeship: Warmian-Masurian
- County: Lidzbark
- Gmina: Kiwity

Krekole [krɛˈkɔlɛ] is a village in the administrative district of Gmina Kiwity, within Lidzbark County, Warmian-Masurian Voivodeship, in northern Poland.
