= Coalition (disambiguation) =

A coalition is a pact or treaty among individuals or groups, during which they cooperate in joint action, each in their own self-interest, joining forces together for a common cause.

Coalition may also refer to:

== Politics ==
- Coalition government, a form of government in which political parties cooperate to form a government
- Liberal–National Coalition, a group of centre-right parties, consisting primarily of the Liberal Party of Australia and the National Party of Australia
- Coalition (Chile), a coalition in Chile formed in 1891 after the Chilean Civil War
- Coalition (Colombia), a conservative political party in Colombia
- Coalition (Netherlands), a historic coalition between three confessional parties of the Netherlands
- Coalition (Puerto Rico), a defunct electoral alliance in Puerto Rico
- Coalition of the willing, a political phrase used to collectively describe participants in military interventions for which the United Nations Security Council cannot agree to mount a full UN peacekeeping operation
- Cameron–Clegg coalition, commonly referred to as 'the Coalition', the 2010–2015 government including the Conservatives and the Liberal Democrats
- The Coalition, a political alliance in Singapore
- National Coalition Party, a centre-right political party in Finland

== Fiction ==
- Coalition (Star Fleet Universe), a group in the Star Fleet Universe

== Other uses ==
- Coalescence (physics), the permanent joining together of two or more bodies
- Coalition, a group of male lions
- Coalition (album), a 1970 album by American jazz drummer Elvin Jones
- Coalition (film), a 2015 British television film
- "Coalition" (Justified), a 2012 episode of the TV series Justified
- Coalition Wars, a series of European conflicts in the late 18th and early 19th centuries
- The Coalition (company), a video game developer
- The Coalition For Women In Journalism, also known as The Coalition

== See also ==
- Coalition of the willing (disambiguation)
- Alliance (disambiguation)
