= Forever (Grailknights album) =

Studio album by Grailknights
- Released: 17 October 2025
- Recorded: 2025
- Genre: Power metal
- Length: 35:48
- Label: Reigning Phoenix
- Producer: Sascha Paeth

Grailknights chronology
Muscle Bound for Glory (2022)	Forever (2025)

Professional ratings
Review scores
Source	Rating
Dead Rhetoric	6.5/10
Powermetal.de	6/10
Metal Hammer	4/7
Metal.de	7/10
Rock Hard	6/10
Scream Magazine	2/6

Forever is the seventh full-length album by German power metal band Grailknights. The album was released on 17 October 2025, through Reigning Phoenix Music.

== Track listing ==
No.	Title	Length
1.	"Yes Sire"	2:30
2.	"Grail Gym"	3:07
3.	"Necronomicon"	2:55
4.	"Weekend Ninja"	3:09
5.	"In the Eyes of the Enemy" (featuring Chiara Tricarico (Moonlight Haze))	3:56
6.	"Snow in Bordeaux"	3:14
7.	"Grailforce One"	2:52
8.	"Mighty Metal Maiden"	3:15
9.	"Animated Love" (absent in original CD edition)	4:22
10.	"Powerlift"	3:19
11.	"Forever"	3:09
12.	"Super Trouper" (ABBA cover) (bonus track)	3:26
Total length:		39:14

== Personnel ==
- Sir Optimus Prime – lead vocals, synthesizers
- Count Cranium – guitars, co-lead vocals
- Sovereign Storm – guitars, co-lead vocals
- Duncan MacLoud – bass, backing vocals, co-lead vocals on track 1
- Lord Drumcules – drums
