= Unholy Alliance =

Unholy Alliance may refer to:

- Unholy alliance (geopolitical), when political antagonists temporarily join together to fight a common enemy
- Unholy Alliance (professional wrestling), an Extreme Championship Wrestling tag team
- The Unholy Alliance Tour, an annual heavy metal tour
- The Unholy Alliance (TV series), a 2017 Hong Kong television drama
- "Unholy Alliance", Parts One and Two, episodes of Highlander: The Series
- "The Unholy Alliance", episode two of ThunderCats (1985)

== Literature ==
- Unholy Alliance, a book by David Yallop
- Unholy Alliance: A History of Nazi Involvement with the Occult, a book by Peter Levenda
- Unholy Alliance: Radical Islam and the American Left, a book by David Horowitz
- Unholy Alliance: Religion and Atrocity in Our Time, a book by Marc H. Ellis.
- An Unholy Alliance, a novel by Susanna Gregory
- Unholy Alliance, a supervillain team from the comic book series Astro City
- Green Lantern/Silver Surfer: Unholy Alliances, a 1995 crossover comic book limited series published by DC Comics and Marvel Comics

== See also ==
- Holy Alliance, an 1815 political coalition of Russia, Austria and Prussia
- Alliance (disambiguation)
- Unholy (disambiguation)
