= Gmina Kiwity =

Gmina Kiwity Kiwity Commune
- Gmina
- Interactive map of Gmina Kiwity
- Coordinates (Kiwity): 54°6′0″N 20°46′14″E
- Country: Poland
- Voivodeship: Warmian-Masurian
- County: Lidzbark
- Seat: Kiwity

Area
  - Total: 145.38 km^{2} (56.13 sq mi)

Population (2006)
  - Total: 3,465
  - Density: 23.83/km^{2} (61.73/sq mi)

Gmina Kiwity is a rural gmina (administrative district) in Lidzbark County, Warmian-Masurian Voivodeship, in northern Poland. Its seat is the village of Kiwity, which lies approximately 13 kilometres (8 mi) east of Lidzbark Warmiński and 40 km (25 mi) north-east of the regional capital Olsztyn.

The gmina covers an area of 145.38 square kilometres (56.1 sq mi), and as of 2006 its total population is 3,465.

== Villages ==
Gmina Kiwity contains the villages and settlements of Bartniki, Czarny Kierz, Kiersnowo, Kierwiny, Kiwity, Klejdyty, Klutajny, Kobiela, Konity, Krekole, Maków, Napraty, Połapin, Rokitnik, Samolubie, Tolniki Wielkie and Żegoty.

== Neighbouring gminas ==
Gmina Kiwity is bordered by the gminas of Bartoszyce, Bisztynek, Jeziorany and Lidzbark Warmiński.
