= Alianza =

Alianza may refer to:

== Sport ==
- Alianza Atlético, Peru
- Alianza Petrolera F.C., Columbia
- Alianza Universidad, Peru
- Club Alianza Lima, Peru
- Alianza F.C. (Colombia)
- Alianza F.C. (El Salvador)
- Alianza F.C. (Panama)

== Music ==
- Alianza (Argentine band), a 1994–2000 hard rock band
- Alianza, a 1992 Anglo-Chilean music project including the band Show of Hands, with an eponymous album

== Organizations ==
- Alianza Puertorriqueña, a defunct political party in Puerto Rico
- Alliance for Work, Justice and Education, a former party coalition in Argentina
- Alianza por Chile, a former right-wing political coalition in Chile
- Alianza Islámica, Latino Muslim organization
- Alianza Uruguaya por el Sufragio Femenino, a Uruguayan women's suffrage organization

== Other uses ==
- Alianza, Honduras, a municipality
- Alianza Editorial, a Spanish publishing house

== See also ==
- Alliance (disambiguation)
