= Unholy (disambiguation) =

Unholy is a concept in religion.

Unholy may also refer to:

== Film ==
- The Unholy (1988 film), a 1988 horror film
- Unholy (2007 film), a 2007 film
- The Unholy (2021 film), a 2021 horror film

== Music ==
- Unholy (band), a Finnish doom metal group
- Unholy (Brainstorm album)
- Unholy (Martin Grech album), 2005
- Unholy (Altaria album), 2009
- "Unholy" (Kiss song), 1992
- "Unholy" (Sam Smith and Kim Petras song), 2022
- Unholy Records, a record label

== See also ==
- Unholy Alliance (disambiguation)
- Unholy Trinity (disambiguation)
