= The Coalition of the Willing =

The Coalition of the Willing may refer to:

- Coalition of the willing, a post-1990 political phrase
  - Coalition of the willing (Iraq War), the military command during the 2003 invasion of Iraq by the United States and much of the ensuing war
  - Coalition of the willing (Russo-Ukrainian War), the coalition of European countries, Australia, Canada, Japan and New Zealand, in support of Ukrainian-centered peace agreements and Ukrainian sovereignty against the Russian invasion of Ukraine
- The Coalition of the Willing (album), a 2006 album by Bobby Previte
- The Coalition of the Willing (band), an instrumental ensemble led by Bobby Previte
- "Coalition of the Willing" (Jericho episode), a television episode

== See also ==
- Coalition (disambiguation)
- Willing (disambiguation)
