= Grailknights =

German metal band

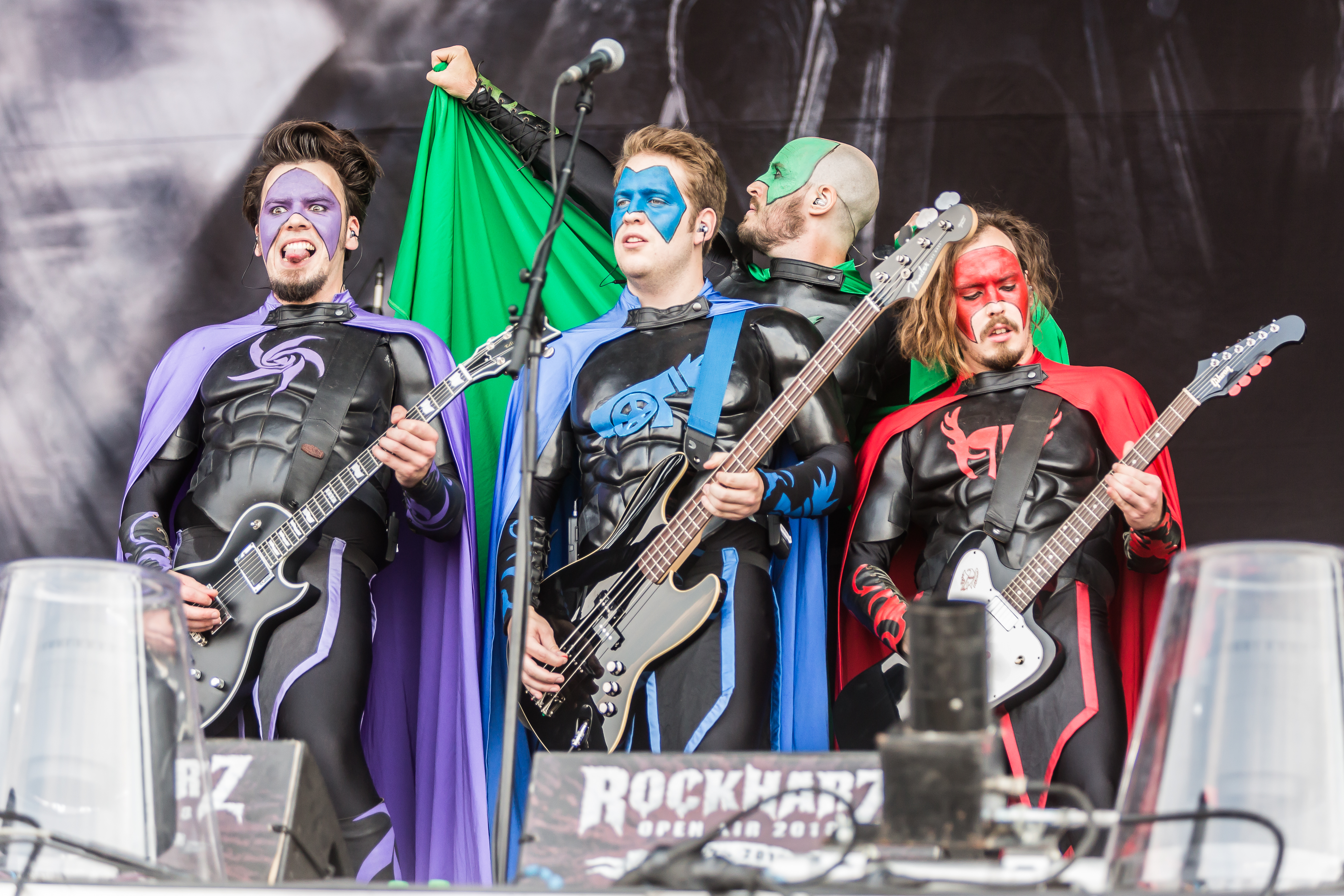
- Grailknights at Rockharz Open Air, 2018.

Background information
- Origin: Hanover, Germany
- Genres: Power metal; melodic death metal; death metal (early)
- Years active: 2002–present
- Members: Sir Optimus Prime; Sovereign Storm; Lord Drumcules; Count Cranium; Duncan MacLoud
- Past members: Duke of Drumington; Baron van der Blast; Baron BigStick; Lord Lightbringer; Earl Quake; Mac Death
- Website: grailknights.de

Grailknights is a German power metal band. They have released seven studio albums. Having roots in death metal, by 2006's Return to Castle Grailskull (a wordplay on Castle Grayskull) the style of the band was described as "classic fantasy power metal with death metal grunts".

== Discography ==
Studio albums

- Across the Galaxy (2004)
- Return to Castle Grailskull (2006)
- Alliance (2008)
- Calling the Choir (2014)
- Knightfall (2018)
- Muscle Bound for Glory (2022)
- Forever (2025)

EPs

- Non Omnis Moriar (2011)
- Dead or Alive (2016)

Live albums

- Live at the Gates of Grailham City (2010)
- The Great VHS Battle - Grailknights Live in Grailham City (2019)

Singles

- "Super Trouper" (ABBA cover) (2026)
