= Knightfall (Grailknights album) =

Studio album by Grailknights
- Released: 4 May 2018
- Recorded: 2017
- Genres: Power metal, heavy metal, melodic death metal
- Length: 43:36
- Label: Intono

Grailknights chronology
Calling the Choir (2014)	Knightfall (2018)	Muscle Bound for Glory (2022)

Professional ratings
Review scores
Source	Rating
Metal Hammer	4/7
Metal.de	7/10
Rock Hard	5/10
Time for Metal	9.5/10

Knightfall is the fifth full-length album by German power metal band Grailknights. The album was released on 4 May 2018, through Intono Records. It features several guest vocalists, most notably Joakim Brodén of Sabaton in "Pumping Iron Power".

== Track listing ==
No.	Title	Length
1.	"Into the Abyss of the Grail" (intro)	3:55
2.	"Pumping Iron Power" (featuring Joakim Brodén)	3:53
3.	"Cthulhu"	3:35
4.	"Black Spider's Web"	4:27
5.	"Grailskull Asylum"	5:14
6.	"March of the Skeletons"	4:22
7.	"Shadow of the Mountain" (featuring Lukas Remus)	3:46
8.	"Laser Raptor 3D"	3:26
9.	"Ghost Town"	4:36
10.	"Book of a Hero"	4:33
11.	"Knightfall" (featuring Van Canto)	4:49
Total length:		43:36

== Personnel ==
- Sir Optimus Prime – lead vocals, acoustic guitar, synthesizers, orchestration
- Count Cranium – guitars
- Sovereign Storm – guitars
- Duncan MacLoud – bass
- Lord Drumcules – drums
