= Alliance (1904 automobile) =

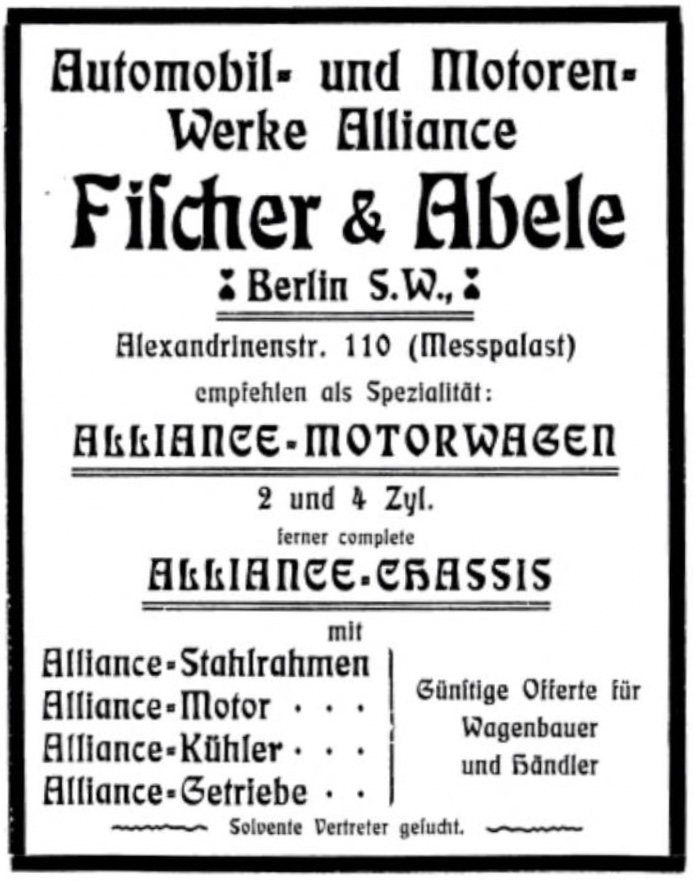
Automobil- und Motorwerke Alliance Fischer & Abele advertisement (1904)

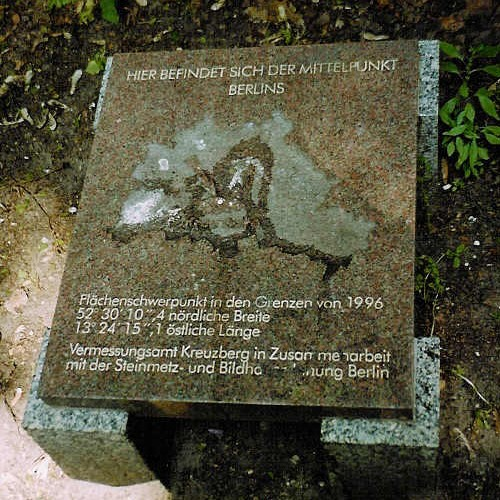
Center of Berlin 1996 marked on a memorial stone at Alexandrinenstraße

The Alliance is an automobile that was made from 1904 to 1905 by Automobil- und Motorwerke Alliance Fischer & Abele, Berlin. The factory was located at 110 Alexandrinen Street. By coincidence, the geometric center of Berlin, within the old borders up to 1996, is located exactly on Alexandrinenstraße and has been commemorated there with a memorial stone. They were powered by either 2- or 4-cylinder engines. Chassis and engines made by the company were often supplied to other factories as proprietary components.
