= Alliance (Grailknights album) =

Studio album by Grailknights
- Released: 24 June 2008
- Recorded: 2008
- Genres: Viking metal, death metal, melodic death metal
- Length: 48:17

Grailknights chronology
Return to Castle Grailskull (2006)	Alliance (2008)	Calling the Choir (2014)

Professional ratings
Review scores
Source	Rating
BurnYourEars	7.5/10
Metal.de	8/10
Nocturnal Hall	9/10

Alliance is the third full-length album by German metal band Grailknights. The album was released on 24 June 2008.

== Track listing ==
No.	Title	Length
1.	"Nameless Grave"	4:35
2.	"Alliance"	5:42
3.	"The White Raven"	4:56
4.	"Echoes of Wisdom"	4:52
5.	"When Good Turns Evil"	3:39
6.	"Tranquility's Embrace"	3:41
7.	"Mortem Obi"	5:47
8.	"In for the Kill"	3:59
9.	"Grailquest Gladiators"	5:40
10.	"Der König von Thule"	5:26
Total length:		48:17

== Personnel ==
- Sir Optimus Prime – vocals, guitars
- Lord Lightbringer – vocals, guitars
- Mac Death – vocals, bass
- Duke of Drumington – drums
