= Nordallianz =

Group of eight Bavarian towns and cities near Munich

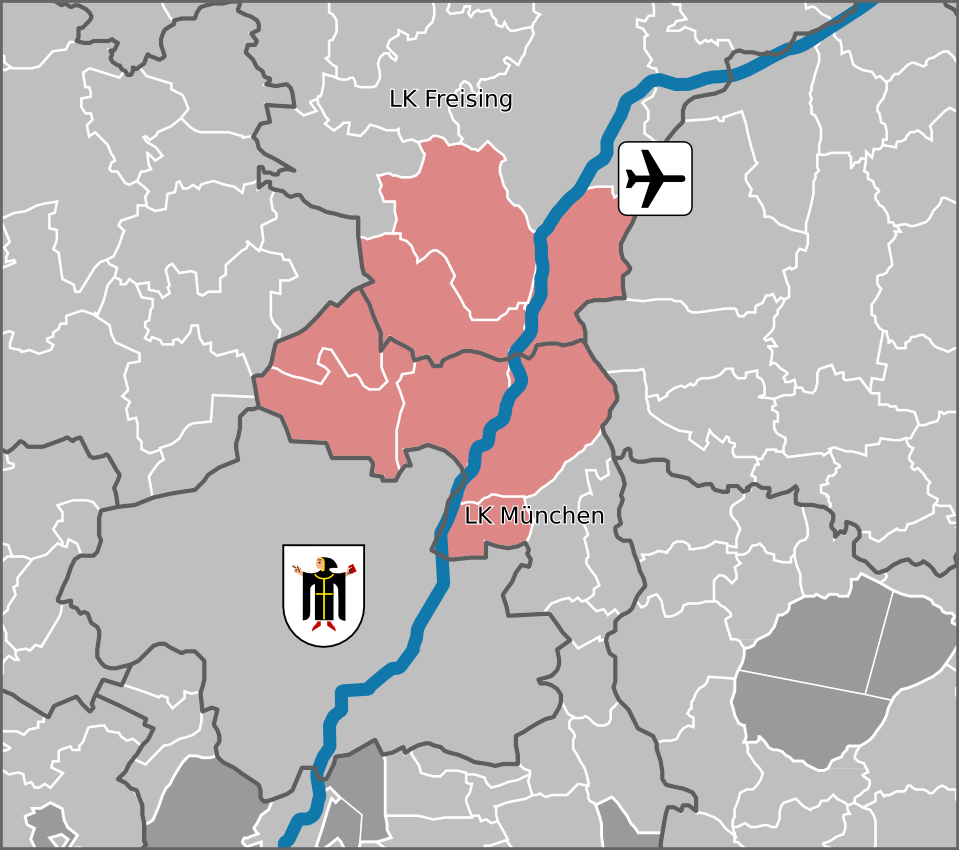

The NordAllianz - Metro Region Munich North (German: NordAllianz - Metropolregion München Nord) is a group of eight towns and cities situated between Munich and Munich Airport.

Its members are:

- Eching
- Garching
- Hallbergmoos
- Ismaning
- Neufahrn
- Oberschleißheim
- Unterföhring
- Unterschleißheim

Originally created to lobby against the establishment of unwanted facilities such as landfills or power plants on the territory of its members, NordAllianz is now promoting the region as a centre for business, science and living.

== Universities and Research Facilities ==
Garching hosts a large science and research campus, where several Departments of the Technical University of Munich (TUM), parts of the Department of Physics of LMU Munich, several Max Planck Institutes, and other research facilities are located. Oberschleißheim also hosts parts of the Department of Veterinary Medicine of LMU Munich.

== Economy ==
Many corporations have located their business outside of Munich and thus within NordAllianz, including the German or European Headquarters of companies such as Microsoft, the EADS, General Electric, Swiss Re, ProSiebenSat.1 Media, and Allianz. This results in the highest nominal economical strength per capita in Germany.

== Transportation ==
Lines S1 and S8 of Munich S-Bahn pass through NordAllianz. The city of Garching is connected via the Munich U-Bahn line U6.

Of the Autobahns around Munich, Bundesautobahn 9, Bundesautobahn 92 and Bundesautobahn 99 pass through the region and provide an extremely dense street network for a region this size.

The planned Munich Transrapid would have passed through NordAllianz. However, as no stop was planned between München Hauptbahnhof and Munich Airport, politicians and citizens of NordAllianz opposed the project. This even included local representatives of the Christian Social Union of Bavaria.
