= Calling the Choir =

Studio album by Grailknights
- Released: 11 April 2014
- Recorded: 2013
- Genre: Power metal, heavy metal, melodic death metal
- Length: 54:27
- Label: Intono

Grailknights chronology
Alliance (2008)	Calling the Choir (2014)	Knightfall (2018)

Professional ratings
Review scores
Source	Rating
Metal Hammer	5/7
Metal.de	7/10
Powermetal.de	8/10
Rock Hard	6.5/10
Time for Metal	9.5/10

Calling the Choir is the fourth full-length album by German power metal band Grailknights. The album was released on 11 April 2014, through Intono Records.

== Track listing ==
No.	Title	Length
1.	"Calling the Choir"	4:27
2.	"Now or Nevermore"	5:27
3.	"Morning Dew"	5:19
4.	"Absence of Gravity"	4:09
5.	"Victorious"	4:25
6.	"Anna Lee"	5:29
7.	"Desert Star"	5:20
8.	"Sea Song"	4:59
9.	"End of the World"	4:28
10.	"Far and Away"	5:51
11.	"Holding Out for a Hero" (Bonnie Tyler cover)	4:33
Total length:		54:27

== Personnel ==
- Sir Optimus Prime – vocals, guitars
- Sovereign Storm – guitars
- Earl Quake – guitars
- Count Cranium – bass
- Lord Drumcules – drums
