= USS Alliance =

Two United States Navy ships have been named Alliance.

- USS Alliance (1778), was a sailing frigate of the Continental Navy, and notable for firing the last shots of the Revolutionary War.
- USS Alliance (1875), was a screw gunboat commissioned in 1877 and in service until 1911.
