= Royal Bavarian Flying Corps =

Gustav Otto early biplane. A type used by the Bavarian Flying Corps.

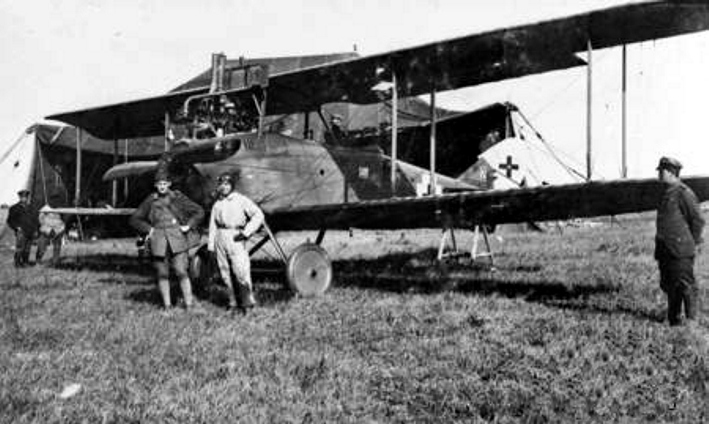
Members of a German squadron, probably Bayrische Flieger Abteilung 287 (Bavarian Flying Section 287) [Assigned to Royal Bavarian Flying Corps], pose in front of a DFW C.V aircraft at Malmaison, Aisne (France) circa 1918. Standing in front of the nose of the aircraft are Leutnant Wolff, wearing a flying jacket, and Gefreiter Müller, wearing flying overalls, helmet and goggles.

The Royal Bavarian Flying Corps (German: Königlich Bayerische Fliegertruppe) was the Army Air Force of the Bavarian Army from 1912 to 1920 and, together with the Royal Bavarian Airship Department, formed the air force of the Kingdom of Bavaria. During World War I, the troops were used as part of the German Air Force (Luftstreitkräfte) and then disbanded in accordance with the provisions of the Versailles Peace Treaty. The nucleus of the air force was stationed at the Oberschleißheim military air station (today Schleißheim airfield) which was created in 1912, under the direction of Luitpold Graf Wolffskeel von Reichenberg (1879-1964). The first standard machines of the newly formed Bavarian air force were the two-seat Otto double-deckers supplied by Gustav Otto.

The Bavarian Flying Corps also had a training station at Gersthofen, near Augsburg. In addition, an aviation detachment was stationed in Ottoman controlled Palestine in 1917.

By the end of the First World War, the Bavarian Air Force suffered 933 dead and missing from crashes.

On May 8, 1920, the Bavarian Air Force was officially dissolved as a result of the Versailles Treaty. A member of the Bayrische Flieger Abteilung 287 was SS General Heinrich Muller who was a Pilot April 1918 to January 1919.

A monument to the pilots of the Royal Bavarian Air Force who died in World War I can be seen in front of the 'Old Palace' in Oberschleissheim. There is also a memorial for fallen German pilots in the First World War in Jenin, (Palestinian Autonomous Region). Members of the corps who died in the Middle East campaigns of World War I are among those buried at the Nazareth German war cemetery.

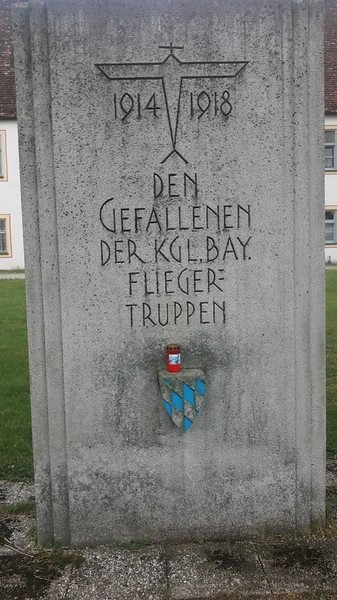
Memorial to the fallen pilots of the Bavarian Flying Corps in World War I. In front of the 'Old Palace' garden in Oberschleissheim, Bavaria, Germany.
