= Alliance School, Hamadan =

Alliance Israélite Universelle school in Iran (est. 1900)

Alliance School Hamadan (Persian: مدرسه آلیانس همدان) was a Jewish school in the Iranian city of Hamadan, founded by the Alliance Israélite Universelle in 1900. The school had two annexes one for boys and one for girls.

The annex for boys had 600 students in the educational year of 1905–1906. According to official statistics given by the Ministry of Education, in 1306 the school had 475 students of whom 159 attended the school free of charge. The school had 19 teachers at that time.

The annex for girls (1900) had 300 students in the educational year of 1905–1906. According to official statistics given by the Ministry of Education in 1306 the school had 259 students of whom 75 attended the school free of charge. The school had 8 teachers at that time. Iranian students of the school were children from the Jewish community and foreign consulates in Hamadan and mostly from upper-class families.

== See also ==
- Alliance School, Tehran
- Alliance School, Kermanshah

== Sources ==
- Netzer, A. (1985). "ALLIANCE ISRAÉLITE UNIVERSELLE". Encyclopaedia Iranica, Vol. I, Fasc. 8. pp. 893–895.
