= Nazareth German war cemetery =

First World War cemetery in Nazareth, Israel

- Deutsche Kriegsgräberstätte Nazareth
- The bell tower and hall of honor in 2008
- Interactive map of Nazareth German war cemetery

Details
- Established: 30 June 1935
- Location: Nazareth
- Country: Israel
- Coordinates: 32.7041°N 35.3108°E
- Type: Military
- Size: 1,200 m^{2} (13,000 sq ft)
- No. of interments: 217

The Nazareth German war cemetery (German: Deutscher Soldatenfriedhof in Nazareth) is a First World War military cemetery in Nazareth, Israel, near the Holy Family Hospital. It holds the graves of German soldiers who died in what became British Mandate Palestine and Transjordan during the Sinai and Palestine campaign of the war. This includes many airmen and members of the Royal Bavarian Flying Corps.

It was built by the German War Graves Commission (Volksbund Deutsche Kriegsgräberfürsorge) with a design by Robert Tischler and dedicated on 30 June 1935.

It is the only German war cemetery in Israel.

== History ==
=== Wartime burials ===
During the First World War the Holy Family Hospital of the Austrian Brothers of Mercy in Nazareth served as Imperial German Field Hospital No. 213. Nazareth was also the headquarters of the Yildirim Army Group, the Ottoman army group under German command.

Fifty-one German soldiers who were killed in action or died in the hospital were buried next to it. Those not buried at Nazareth lay in small cemeteries and single graves across the country, most of them in poor condition by the late 1920s.

=== Construction and dedication ===
The Treaty of Versailles required the British to care for the graves of enemy soldiers in Palestine. In December, 1928, British authorities in Palestine agreed with the German consul-general to establish a central German cemetery. It would be located at Nazareth for the burial of German dead of Palestine and Transjordan. Some German soldiers remained buried at smaller cemeteries in Jerusalem or in British war cemeteries.

The German War Graves Commission agreed in May 1931 to meet the cost. The High Commissioner for Palestine acquired a 1,200-square-metre (13,000 sq ft) plot beside the hospital, and it was leased to the German Reich for 999 years without charge. The municipality of Nazareth issued the building permit on 11 August 1934.

The commission's architect, Robert Tischler, designed the cemetery, and construction began in 1934. Builders from Nazareth carried out the work. The dead were brought in from temporary graves across Palestine and Transjordan, including Anabta, Beersheba, Jenin, Ma'an, Mafraq, Salt, Samakh and Tulkarm, with the help of the British war graves authorities.

The cemetery was dedicated on 30 June 1935. Representatives of Germany's wartime allies, the Evangelical and Catholic churches, the Templers and the local Nazi Party attended and a swastika flag flew from the tower. Adolf Hitler sent a telegram regarding the dedication.

=== Later history ===
During the Arab revolt of 1936 Austrian brothers continued to tend the graves, keeping in touch with the German Foreign Office through the Spanish consul in Jerusalem until the end of the Second World War. The hospital and the care of the cemetery later passed to Italian brothers that were from the same Christian order.

The German War Graves Commission has paid for the upkeep since the first years after the Second World War. Major repairs were carried out in 1967 and 1982. In 1982 Cardinal Joseph Höffner donated a new bell frame and a motor for the bell.

The land is now owned by the State of Israel, from which it is leased. There is no war-graves agreement between Germany and Israel, but the Israeli government guarantees the permanent right of rest of the dead and the protection of the site.

== Description ==
The central path between the rows of graves and their tablets

The cemetery is reached through a locked gate to the right of the hospital, across the brothers' cemetery and up a narrow stair. As built, it consisted of a court of honor, a bell tower, a covered hall of honor and two rows of open tomb chambers.

The tower holds a bell cast in Munich, about 1.5 metres (4.9 ft) across and weighing nearly two tonnes, one of the largest in Israel.

Wooden crosses made from the propellers of crashed aircraft hang on the tower walls. Red Weser sandstone slabs were shipped from Germany for its construction.

== Burials ==
Tablet of grave 51, which Alfred Gerechter shares with two other soldiers

The cemetery holds primarily German, but also some Austro-Hungarian, soldiers and airmen of the First World War. The number buried is somewhere between 217 and 261. Tablets give each man's name, dates and place of death and are arranged by place of death. A second row of tablets commemorates about 250 German and Austrian dead whose graves were never found.

Among those buried is Alfred Gerechter, a German Jewish soldier killed at Salt on 30 April 1918.

== Commemoration ==
Since the early 1980s the German embassy in Israel has held an annual ceremony at the cemetery on Volkstrauertag, the German day of national mourning. It is attended by foreign military attachés and Israeli soldiers.

The service is interfaith, and an Israel Defense Forces rabbi recites the Kaddish for the dead.
