= HMS Alliance =

Several ships of the Royal Navy have been named HMS Alliance:

- HMS Alliance, originally the Dutch frigate Alliantie captured from the Dutch Navy off the coast of Norway on 22 August 1795 that the Royal Navy used as a 22-gun store ship. Sold May 1802.
- HMS Alliance (W77), lead vessel of her class of four tugs, launched 1910 and scuttled in Hong Kong in 1941 to prevent her capture by the invading Japanese forces.
- HMS Alliance (P417), a submarine launched in 1945 but not completed until 1947, and now a museum ship and the only surviving member of her class.
