= Alliance School, Kermanshah =

Alliance Israélite Universelle school in Iran (est. 1904)

Alliance School Kermanshah (Persian: مدرسه آلیانس کرمانشاه) was a Jewish school in the western Iranian city of Kermanshah, founded by the Alliance Israélite Universelle. It provided education up to 18 years old and had two annexes; one for girls and one for boys.

The Alliance Israélite Universelle was founded in Paris in 1860. In April 1898, the first Alliance school opened in Tehran. Several years later, in 1904, an Alliance school was founded in Kermanshah as well. It provided modern education to the Jewish citizens of Kermanshah. In 1977, the school had 314 students of which 171 were Jews.

The principals of the school were Monsieur Saki in 1905, then Kohan in 1908 and after him it was Monsieur Franco, who stayed for 10 years.

Elyahou Raḥamim Pirnazar (1898–1988) enrolled into the school in 1904. He became "one of the early licensed Iranian Jewish attorneys practicing in Iran".

In Reza Shah's era (r. 1925–1941), Alliance schools became non-governmental and went under the control of Iran's Ministry of Education. These Schools changed name from Alliance to Etehad. When the 1979 Iranian revolution occurred, Alliance schools (Etehad) could not continue any more.

== See also ==
- Alliance School, Tehran
- Alliance School, Hamadan
