= Amnon Netzer =

Persian-Jewish historian of Iran (1934–2008)

- אמנון נצר
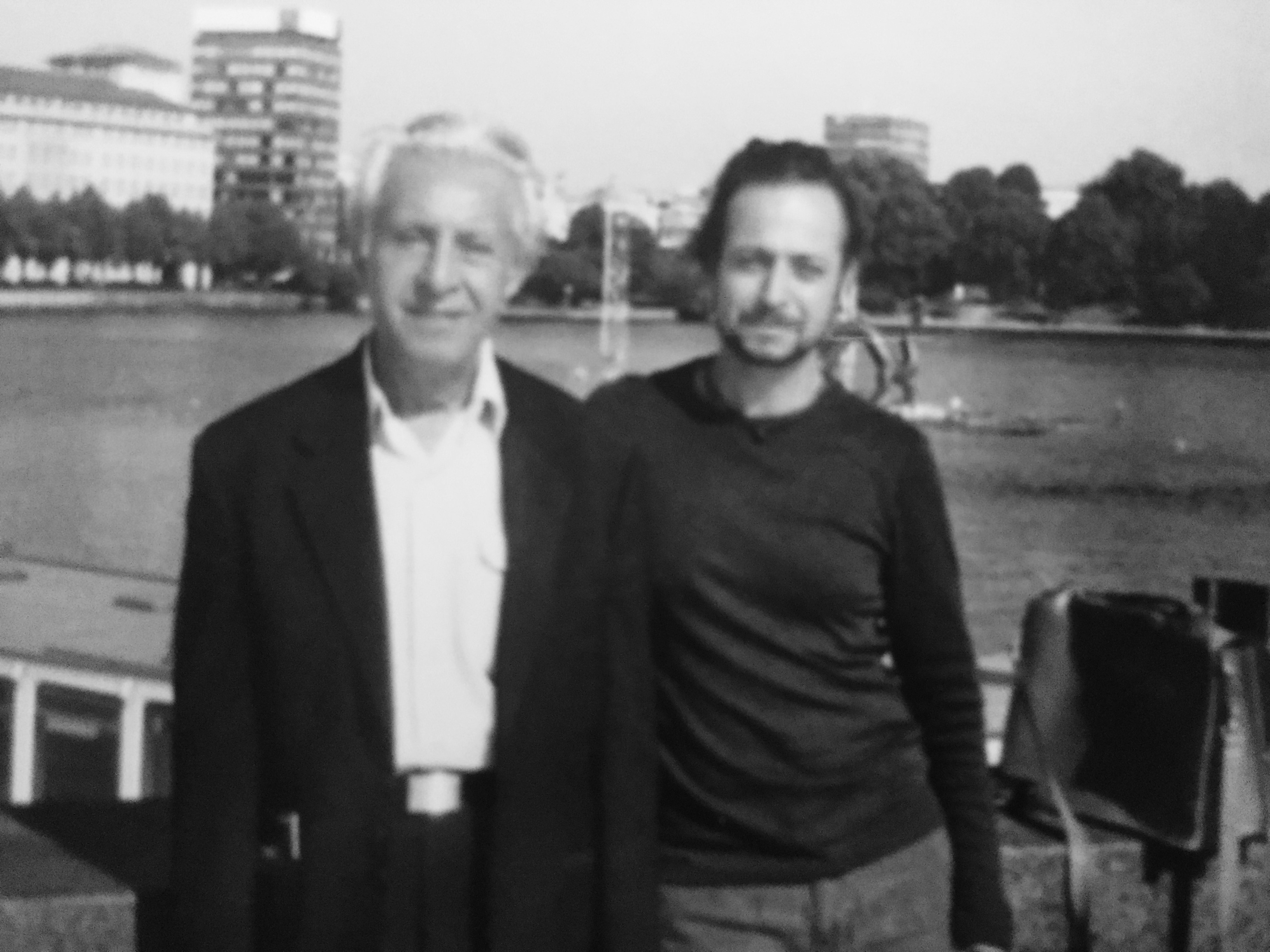
- Born: April 9, 1934; Rasht, Iran
- Died: February 15, 2008 (aged 73); Los Angeles, California, U.S.
- Occupations: writer, historian
- Title: Amnon Netzer at Iranian Conference, Hamburg, 2007

Amnon Netzer (Hebrew: אמנון נצר; April 9, 1934 – February 15, 2008) was an Iranian-born Israeli historian, researcher, professor and journalist. Netzer was a leading authority on Iranian history and culture as well as Persian and Judeo-Persian languages. Netzer founded Israel Broadcasting Authority's Persian Service in 1958 and was a professor at the Hebrew University of Jerusalem until his death in 2008.

== Biography ==
Amnon Netzer was born as Naser Soluki in Rasht, Iran. He immigrated to Israel in 1950. In 1963 graduated with degree in Middle East and International Affairs from the Hebrew University of Jerusalem. In 1965, he received his degree from Columbia University in New York in Iranian Studies, Indo-European Languages, and Semitic Language and Literature. In 1969 he received his doctoral degrees in the same subjects from Columbia.

== Journalism and radio career ==
In 1958, he launched the daily Persian language broadcasts for the Voice of Israel radio. In 1970 Netzer returned to Israel where he co-founded the Iranian Studies Department at Jerusalem Hebrew University and began his research in Iranian Jewish History and Culture. He has not only authored numerous articles about Iranian Jews in Persian, Hebrew, English, and French worldwide, but helped edit and compile "Padyavand" a comprehensive three volume book detailing various significant events in Iranian Jewish history. In 1988 Netzer was Recipient of the Distinguished Professor commendation from Jerusalem Hebrew University.
