= Midwest League Top MLB Prospect Award =

- Sport: Baseball
- League: Midwest League
- Awarded for: Best regular-season rookie in the Midwest League
- Country: United States
- Presented by: Midwest League

History
- First award: Arturo Miro (1956)
- Most recent: Alfredo Duno (2026)

The Midwest League Top MLB Prospect Award is an annual award given to the best rookie player in Minor League Baseball's Midwest League based on their regular-season performance as voted on by league managers. League broadcasters, Minor League Baseball executives, and members of the media have previously voted as well. Though the league was established in 1947, the award was not created until 1956 as the Prospect of the Year Award. After the cancellation of the 2020 season, the league was known as the High-A Central in 2021 before reverting to the Midwest League name in 2022. The Top MLB Prospect Award began to be issued instead of the Prospect of the Year Award in 2021.

Sixteen outfielders have won the Top MLB Prospect Award, the most of any position. Shortstops, with 15 winners, have won the most among infielders, followed by third basemen (4), first basemen (3), and second basemen (1). Thirteen pitchers and six catchers have also won the award.

Twenty-four players who have won the Top MLB Prospect Award also won the Midwest League Most Valuable Player Award in the same season: Willie Wilson (1975), Paul Molitor (1977), Bill Foley (1978), Dave Stockstill (1979), Von Hayes (1980), Luis Medina (1986), Tom Redington (1989), Reggie Sanders (1990), Salomón Torres (1991), Steve Gibralter (1992), Pablo Ozuna (1998), Albert Pujols (2000), Adrián González (2001), Prince Fielder (2003), Brian Dopirak (2004), Carlos González (2005), Ben Revere (2008), Dee Strange-Gordon (2009), Mike Trout (2010), Rymer Liriano (2011), Byron Buxton (2013), Eloy Jiménez (2016), Bo Bichette (2017), and Andy Pages (2021).

Six players from the Cedar Rapids Kernels have been selected for the Top MLB Prospect Award, more than any other team in the league, followed by the Beloit Sky Carp and Waterloo Indians (5); the South Bend Cubs (4); the Burlington Bees, Clinton Pirates, Dayton Dragons, Great Lakes Loons, Lansing Lugnuts, Peoria Chiefs, Quad Cities River Bandits, and West Michigan Whitecaps (3); the Fort Wayne TinCaps, Kenosha Twins, Wausau Timbers, and Wisconsin Timber Rattlers (2); and the Bowling Green Hot Rods, Decatur Commodores, Kane County Cougars, Kokomo Dodgers, Michigan City White Caps, and Rockford Royals (1).

Eight players from the Minnesota Twins Major League Baseball (MLB) organization have won the award, more than any other, followed by the Chicago Cubs and Cincinnati Reds organizations (6); the Detroit Tigers, Kansas City Royals, Los Angeles Dodgers, and Milwaukee Brewers organizations (4); the San Francisco Giants and St. Louis Cardinals organizations (3); the Arizona Diamondbacks, Atlanta Braves, Cleveland Guardians, Miami Marlins, and Seattle Mariners organizations (2); and the Boston Red Sox, Los Angeles Angels, Pittsburgh Pirates, San Diego Padres, Tampa Bay Rays, and Toronto Blue Jays organizations (1).

== Winners ==
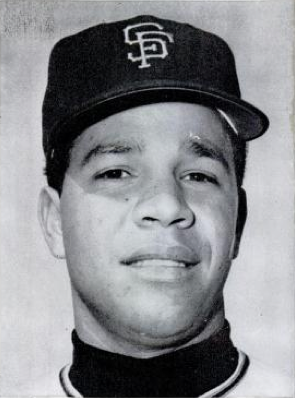
Juan Marichal, the 1958 winner, was inducted into the Baseball Hall of Fame in 1983.

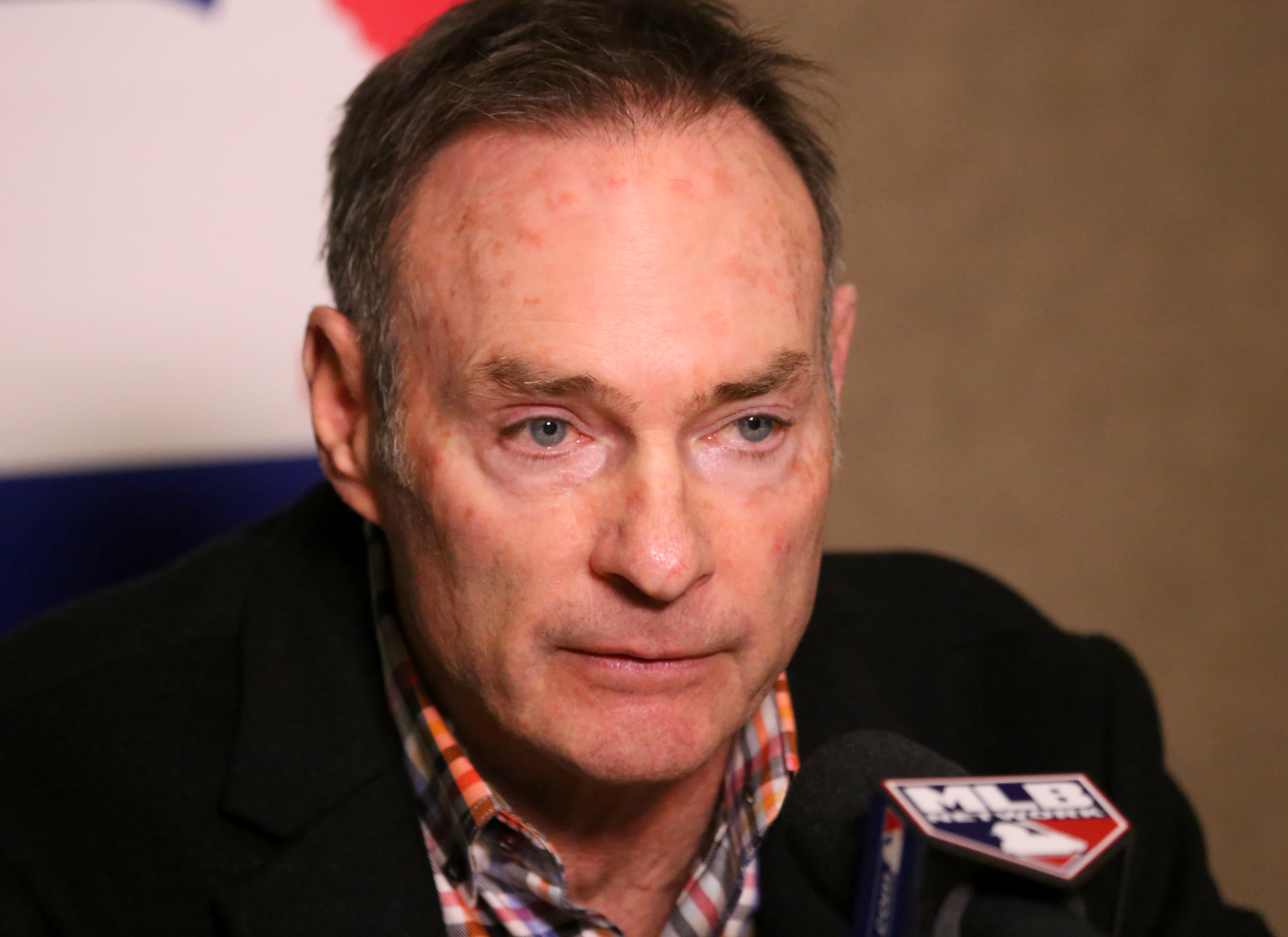
Paul Molitor, the 1977 winner was inducted into the Baseball Hall of Fame in 2004.

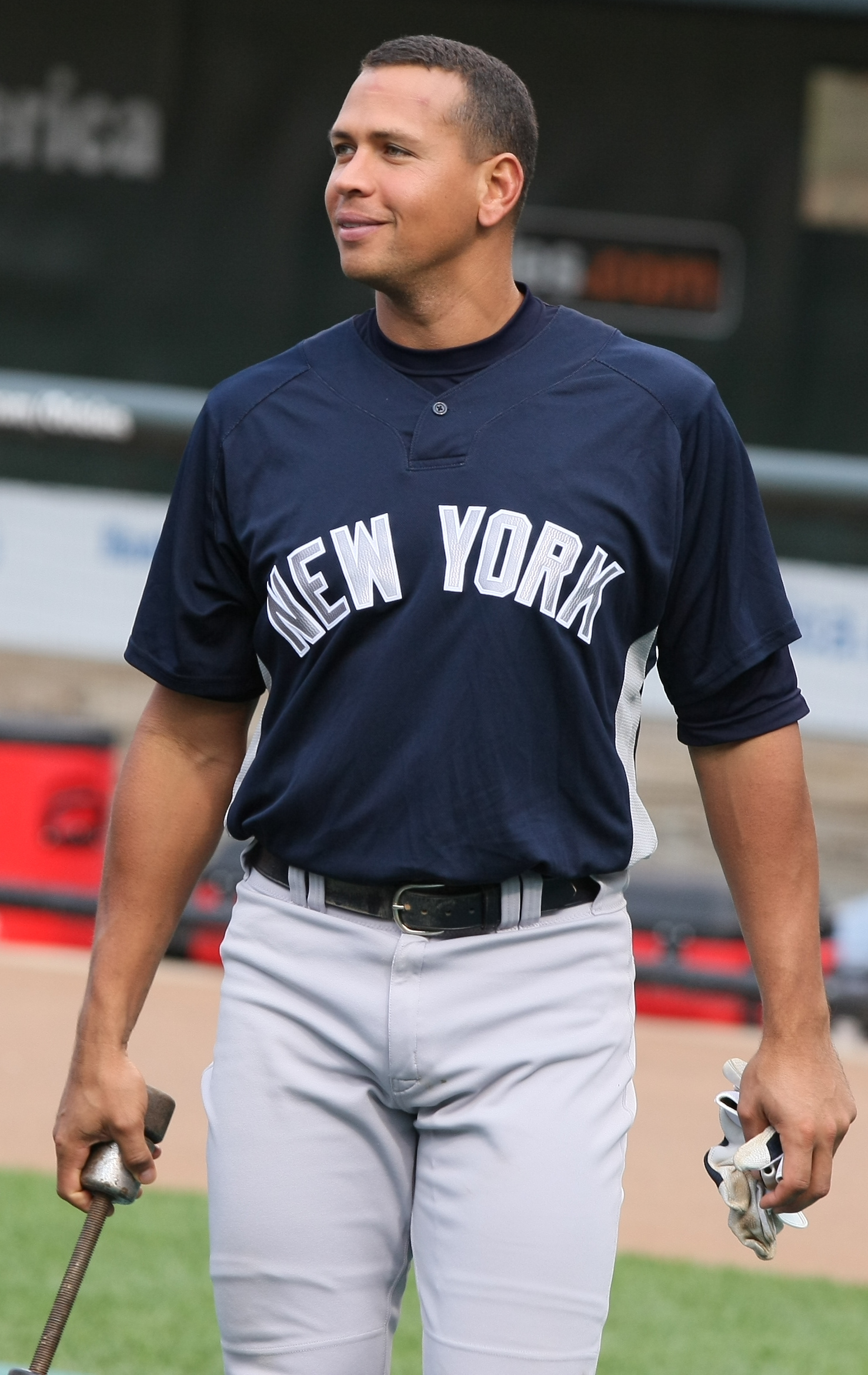
Alex Rodriguez, the 1994 winner, won the American League Most Valuable Player Award in 2003, 2005, and 2007.

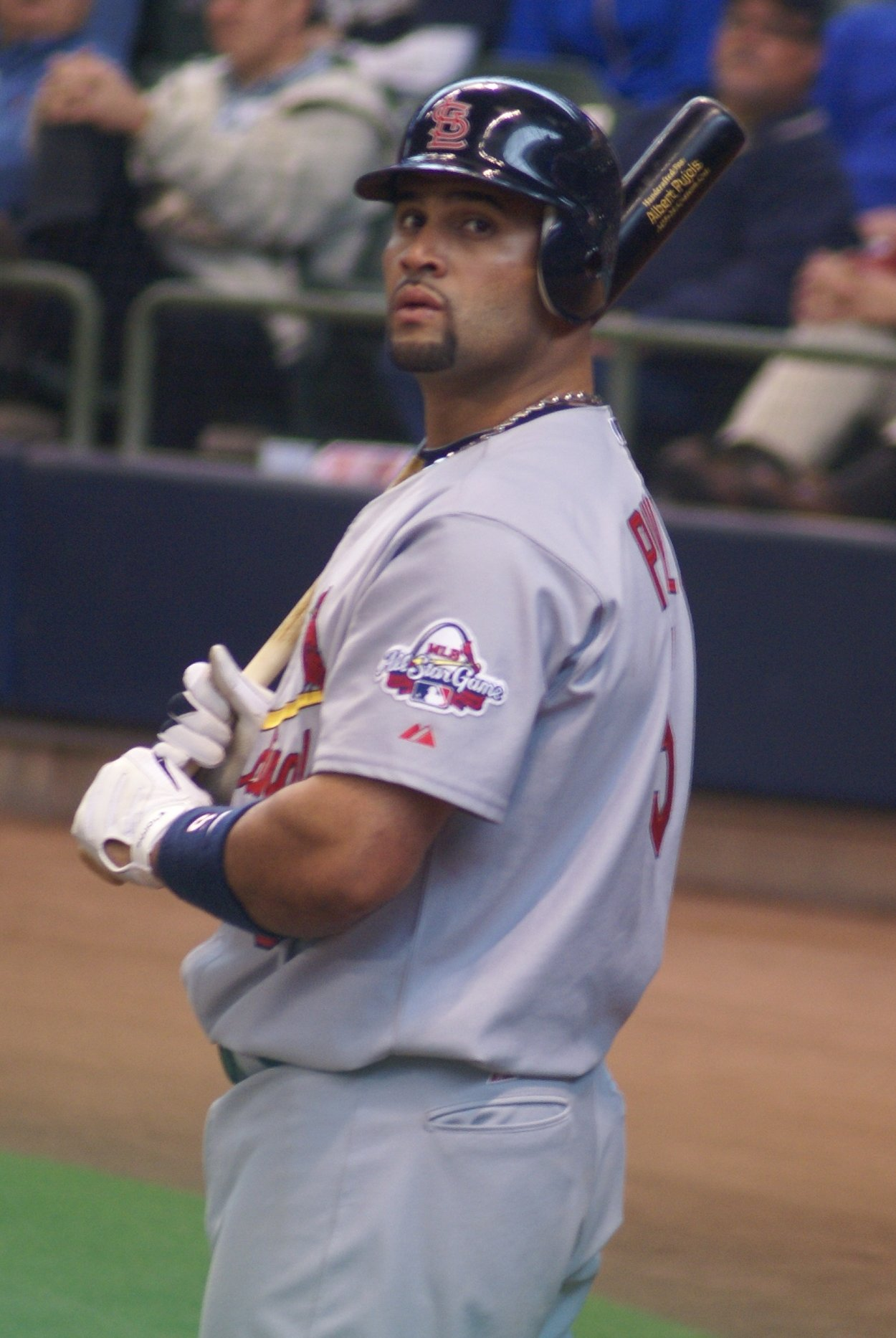
Albert Pujols, the 2000 winner, won the National League Rookie of the Year Award in 2001 and the NL MVP Award in 2005, 2008, and 2009.

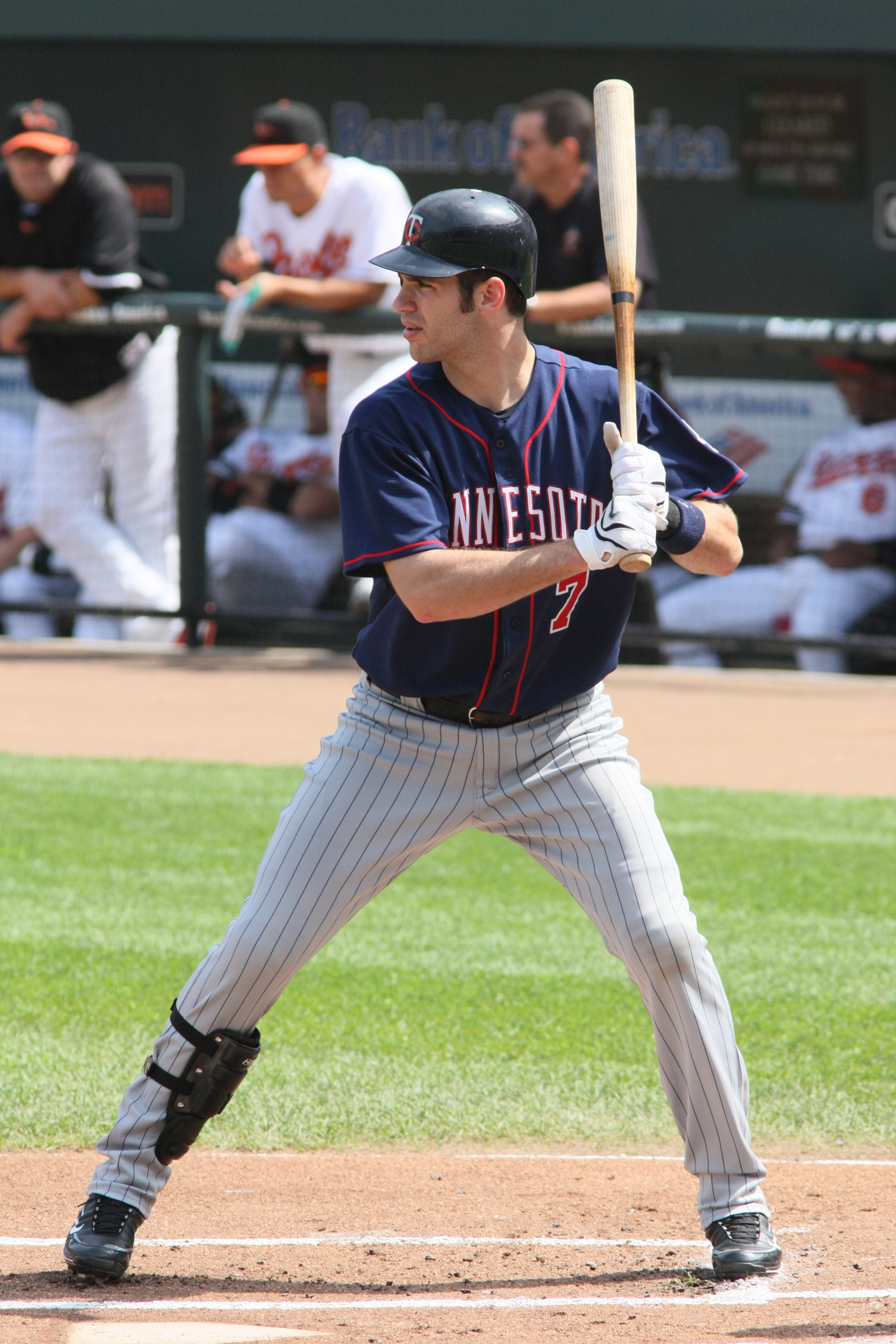
Joe Mauer, the 2002 winner, won the AL MVP Award in 2009.

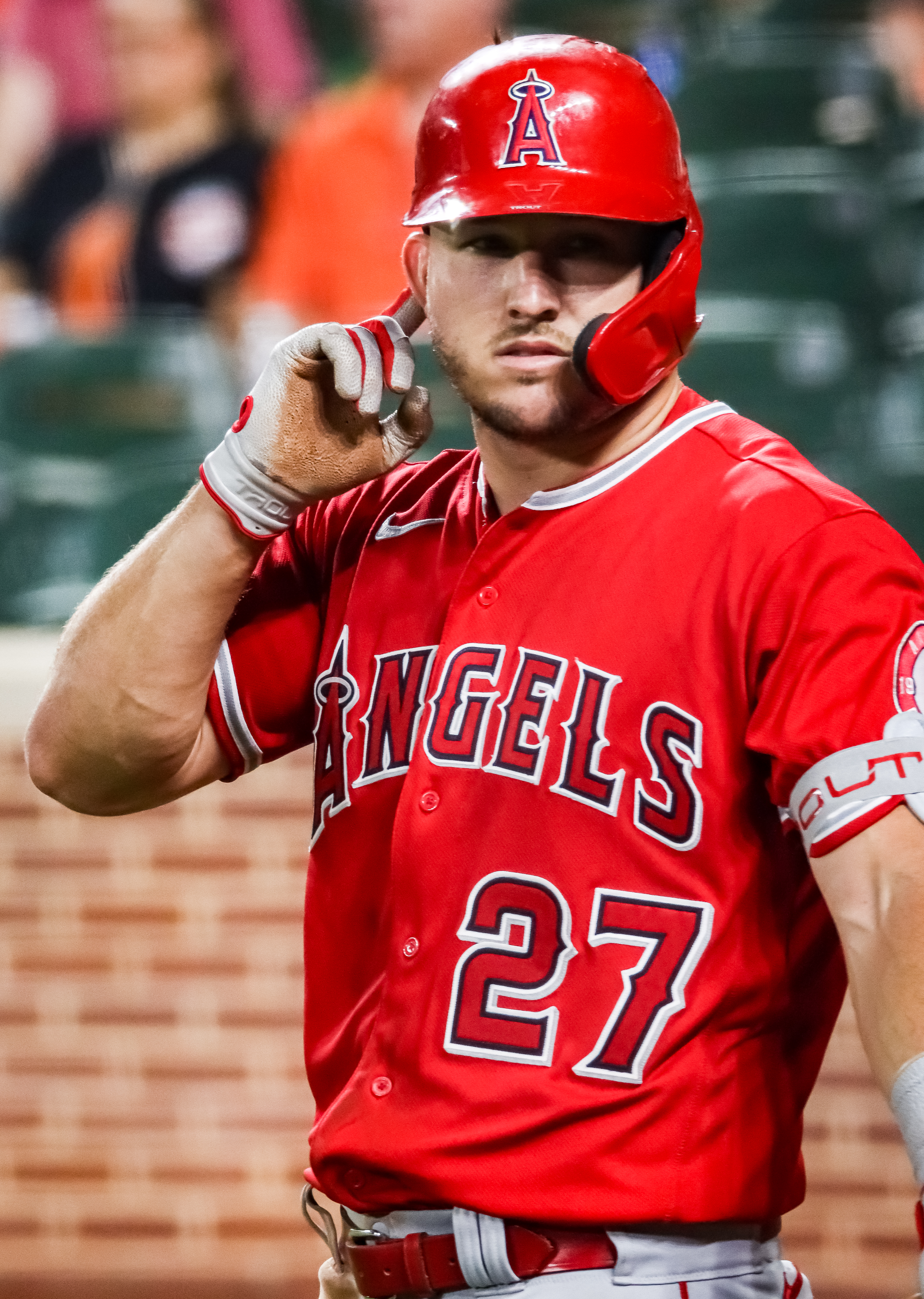
Mike Trout, the 2010 winner, won the AL Rookie of the Year Award in 2012 and the AL MVP Award in 2014, 2016, and 2019.

Key
Position	Indicates the player's primary position
^	Indicates multiple award winners in the same year

Winners
Year	Winner	Team	Organization	Position	Ref(s).
1956	Arturo Miro	Clinton Pirates	Pittsburgh Pirates	Pitcher	
1957	None selected				
1958	Juan Marichal	Michigan City White Caps	San Francisco Giants	Pitcher	
1959	Dale Reichert	Kokomo Dodgers	Los Angeles Dodgers	Shortstop	
1960	Bob Sprout	Decatur Commodores	Detroit Tigers	Pitcher	
1961	Dennis Ribant	Davenport Braves	Milwaukee Braves	Pitcher	
1962	Barry Shollenberger	Waterloo Hawks	Boston Red Sox	Pitcher	
1963	None selected				
1964	None selected				
1965	None selected				
1966	None selected				
1967	None selected				
1968	None selected				
1969	None selected				
1970	None selected				
1971	None selected				
1972	None selected				
1973	None selected				
1974	None selected				
1975	Willie Wilson	Waterloo Royals	Kansas City Royals	Outfielder	
1976	Clint Hurdle	Waterloo Royals	Kansas City Royals	Outfielder	
1977	Paul Molitor	Burlington Bees	Milwaukee Brewers	Shortstop	
1978	Bill Foley	Burlington Bees	Milwaukee Brewers	Catcher	
1979	Dave Stockstill	Wausau Timbers	Chicago Cubs	Outfielder	
1980	Von Hayes	Waterloo Indians	Cleveland Indians	Third baseman	
1981	Harold Reynolds	Wausau Timbers	Seattle Mariners	Second baseman	
1982	Mark Grant	Clinton Giants	San Francisco Giants	Pitcher	
1983	Shawon Dunston	Quad Cities Cubs	Chicago Cubs	Shortstop	
1984	Kurt Stillwell	Cedar Rapids Reds	Cincinnati Reds	Shortstop	
1985	B. J. Surhoff	Beloit Brewers	Milwaukee Brewers	Catcher	
1986^	Luis Medina	Waterloo Indians	Cleveland Indians	Outfielder	
1986^	Steve Gasser	Kenosha Twins	Minnesota Twins	Pitcher	
1987	Derek Parks	Kenosha Twins	Minnesota Twins	Catcher	
1988	Tom Gordon	Appleton Foxes	Kansas City Royals	Pitcher	
1989	Tom Redington	Burlington Braves	Atlanta Braves	Third baseman	
1990	Reggie Sanders	Cedar Rapids Reds	Cincinnati Reds	Outfielder	
1991	Salomón Torres	Clinton Giants	San Francisco Giants	Pitcher	
1992	Steve Gibralter	Cedar Rapids Reds	Cincinnati Reds	Outfielder	
1993	Johnny Damon	Rockford Royals	Kansas City Royals	Outfielder	
1994	Alex Rodriguez	Appleton Foxes	Seattle Mariners	Shortstop	
1995	Javier Valentín	Fort Wayne Wizards	Minnesota Twins	Catcher	
1996	Britt Reames	Peoria Chiefs	St. Louis Cardinals	Pitcher	
1997	Francisco Cordero	West Michigan Whitecaps	Detroit Tigers	Pitcher	
1998	Pablo Ozuna	Peoria Chiefs	St. Louis Cardinals	Shortstop	
1999	Corey Patterson	Lansing Lugnuts	Chicago Cubs	Outfielder	
2000	Albert Pujols	Peoria Chiefs	St. Louis Cardinals	Third baseman	
2001	Adrián González	Kane County Cougars	Florida Marlins	First baseman	
2002	Joe Mauer	Quad Cities River Bandits	Minnesota Twins	Catcher	
2003	Prince Fielder	Beloit Snappers	Milwaukee Brewers	First baseman	
2004	Brian Dopirak	Lansing Lugnuts	Chicago Cubs	First baseman	
2005	Carlos González	South Bend Silver Hawks	Arizona Diamondbacks	Outfielder	
2006	Cameron Maybin	West Michigan Whitecaps	Detroit Tigers	Outfielder	
2007	Clayton Kershaw	Great Lakes Loons	Los Angeles Dodgers	Pitcher	
2008	Ben Revere	Beloit Snappers	Minnesota Twins	Outfielder	
2009	Dee Strange-Gordon	Great Lakes Loons	Los Angeles Dodgers	Shortstop	
2010	Mike Trout	Cedar Rapids Kernels	Los Angeles Angels of Anaheim	Outfielder	
2011	Rymer Liriano	Fort Wayne TinCaps	San Diego Padres	Outfielder	
2012	Miguel Sanó	Beloit Snappers	Minnesota Twins	Third baseman	
2013	Byron Buxton	Cedar Rapids Kernels	Minnesota Twins	Outfielder	
2014	Andrew Velazquez	South Bend Silver Hawks	Arizona Diamondbacks	Shortstop	
2015	Gleyber Torres	South Bend Cubs	Chicago Cubs	Shortstop	
2016	Eloy Jiménez	South Bend Cubs	Chicago Cubs	Outfielder	
2017	Bo Bichette	Lansing Lugnuts	Toronto Blue Jays	Shortstop	
2018	Royce Lewis	Cedar Rapids Kernels	Minnesota Twins	Shortstop	
2019	Wander Franco	Bowling Green Hot Rods	Tampa Bay Rays	Shortstop	
2020	None selected (season cancelled due to COVID-19 pandemic)				
2021	Andy Pages	Great Lakes Loons	Los Angeles Dodgers	Outfielder	
2022	Elly De La Cruz	Dayton Dragons	Cincinnati Reds	Shortstop	
2023	Edwin Arroyo	Dayton Dragons	Cincinnati Reds	Shortstop	
2024	Thomas White	Beloit Sky Carp	Miami Marlins	Pitcher	
2025	Kevin McGonigle	West Michigan Whitecaps	Detroit Tigers	Shortstop	
2026	Alfredo Duno	Dayton Dragons	Cincinnati Reds	Catcher	

== Wins by team ==
Active Midwest League teams appear in bold.

Team	Award(s)	Year(s)
**Cedar Rapids Kernels** (Cedar Rapids Reds)	6	1984, 1990, 1992, 2010, 2013, 2018
**Beloit Sky Carp** (Beloit Brewers/Snappers)	5	1995, 2003, 2008, 2012, 2024
Waterloo Indians (Waterloo Hawks/Royals)	5	1962, 1975, 1976, 1980, 1986
**South Bend Cubs** (South Bend Silver Hawks)	4	2005, 2014, 2015, 2016
Burlington Bees (Burlington Braves)	3	1977, 1978, 1989
Clinton Pirates (Clinton Pirates)	3	1956, 1982, 1991
**Dayton Dragons**	3	2022, 2023, 2026
**Great Lakes Loons**	3	2007, 2009, 2021
**Lansing Lugnuts**	3	1999, 2004, 2017
**Peoria Chiefs**	3	1996, 1998, 2000
**Quad Cities River Bandits** (Davenport Braves/Quad Cities Cubs)	3	1961, 1983, 2002
**West Michigan Whitecaps**	1997, 2006, 2025	
**Fort Wayne TinCaps** (Fort Wayne Wizards)	2	1995, 2011
Kenosha Twins	2	1986, 1987
Wausau Timbers	2	1979, 1981
**Wisconsin Timber Rattlers** (Appleton Foxes)	2	1988, 1994
Bowling Green Hot Rods	1	2019
Decatur Commodores	1	1960
Kane County Cougars	1	2001
Kokomo Dodgers	1	1959
Michigan City White Caps	1	1958
Rockford Royals	1	1993

== Wins by organization ==
Active Midwest League–Major League Baseball affiliations appear in bold.

Organization	Award(s)	Year(s)
**Minnesota Twins**	8	1986, 1987, 1995, 2002, 2008, 2012, 2013, 2018
**Chicago Cubs**	6	1979, 1983, 1999, 2004, 2015, 2016
**Cincinnati Reds**	6	1984, 1990, 1992, 2022, 2023, 2026
**Detroit Tigers**	4	1960, 1997, 2006, 2025
**Kansas City Royals**	4	1975, 1976, 1988, 1993
**Los Angeles Dodgers**	4	1959, 2007, 2009, 2021
**Milwaukee Brewers**	4	1977, 1978, 1985, 2003
San Francisco Giants	3	1958, 1982, 1991
**St. Louis Cardinals**	3	1996, 1998, 2000
Arizona Diamondbacks	2	2005, 2014
Atlanta Braves (Milwaukee Braves)	2	1961, 1989
**Cleveland Guardians** (Cleveland Indians)	2	1980, 1986
**Miami Marlins** (Florida Marlins)	2	2001, 2024
Seattle Mariners	2	1981, 1994
Boston Red Sox	1	1962
Los Angeles Angels	1	2010
Pittsburgh Pirates	1	1956
**San Diego Padres**	1	2011
Tampa Bay Rays	1	2019
Toronto Blue Jays	1	2017
