= Liriano =

- Language: Italian

Origin
- Region of origin: Naples, Italy

Liriano is an Italian name common in Naples, Italy. Meaning wealth, fountain of prosperity, or from Rome. There are a group of people who immigrated from Italy in the early 1900s to the Dominican Republic with this surname.

== People with Liriano as last/family name ==
- Francisco Liriano, Dominican baseball pitcher
- Nelson Liriano, Dominican baseball player
- Pedro Liriano, Dominican baseball player
- Rymer Liriano, Dominican baseball player
