= Midwest League Most Valuable Player Award =

- Sport: Baseball
- League: Midwest League
- Awarded for: Regular-season most valuable player of the Midwest League
- Country: United States
- Presented by: Midwest League

History
- First award: Deacon Jones (1956)
- Most recent: Charles Davalan (2026)

The Midwest League Most Valuable Player Award (MVP) is an annual award given to the best player in Minor League Baseball's Midwest League based on their regular-season performance as voted on by league managers. League broadcasters, Minor League Baseball executives, and members of the media have previously voted as well. Though the league was established in 1947, the award was not created until 1956. After the cancellation of the 2020 season, the league was known as the High-A Central in 2021 before reverting to the Midwest League name in 2022.

Twenty-five outfielders have won the MVP Award, the most of any position. First basemen, with 11 winners, have won the most among infielders, followed by third basemen (8), shortstops (4), and second basemen (2). Six catchers and three pitchers have also won the award.

Twenty-four players who have won the MVP Award also won the Midwest League Top MLB Prospect Award (formerly the Prospect of the Year Award) in the same season: Willie Wilson (1975), Paul Molitor (1977), Bill Foley (1978), Dave Stockstill (1979), Von Hayes (1980), Luis Medina (1986), Tom Redington (1989), Reggie Sanders (1990), Salomón Torres (1991), Steve Gibralter (1992), Pablo Ozuna (1998), Albert Pujols (2000), Adrián González (2001), Prince Fielder (2003), Brian Dopirak (2004), Carlos González (2005), Ben Revere (2008), Dee Strange-Gordon (2009), Mike Trout (2010), Rymer Liriano (2011), Byron Buxton (2013), Eloy Jiménez (2016), Bo Bichette (2017), and Andy Pages (2021). From 1956 to 2020, pitchers were eligible to win the MVP Award as no award was designated for pitchers. In 2021, the Midwest League established a Pitcher of the Year Award.

Nine players from the Cedar Rapids Kernels have been selected for the MVP Award, more than any other team in the league, followed by the Beloit Sky Carp, Burlington Bees, Great Lakes Loons, Kane County Cougars, Lansing Lugnuts, Waterloo Indians, and West Michigan Whitecaps (4); the Dubuque Packers, Peoria Chiefs, and Springfield Cardinals (3); the South Bend Cubs (2); and the Clinton Giants, Decatur Commodores, Fort Wayne TinCaps, Kenosha Twins, Kokomo Dodgers, Lake County Captains, Madison Muskies, Michigan Battle Cats, Midwest Dodgers, Rockford Royals, and Wausau Timbers (1).

Six players from the Los Angeles Dodgers and St. Louis Cardinals Major League Baseball (MLB) organizations have won the award, more than any others, followed by the Cleveland Guardians, Detroit Tigers, Milwaukee Brewers, and Minnesota Twins organizations (5); the Chicago Cubs, Cincinnati Reds, San Francisco Giants, and Toronto Blue Jays organizations (2); the Arizona Diamondbacks, Kansas City Royals, Los Angeles Angels, Miami Marlins, and Oakland Athletics organizations (2); and the Atlanta Braves, Chicago White Sox, Houston Astros, Pittsburgh Pirates, and San Diego Padres organizations (1).

== Winners ==
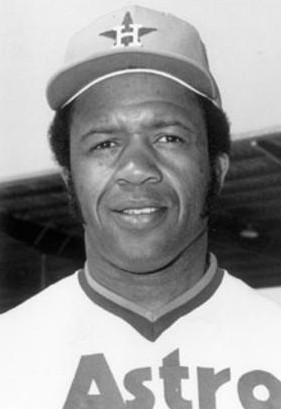
Deacon Jones won the first Midwest League Most Valuable Player Award in 1956.

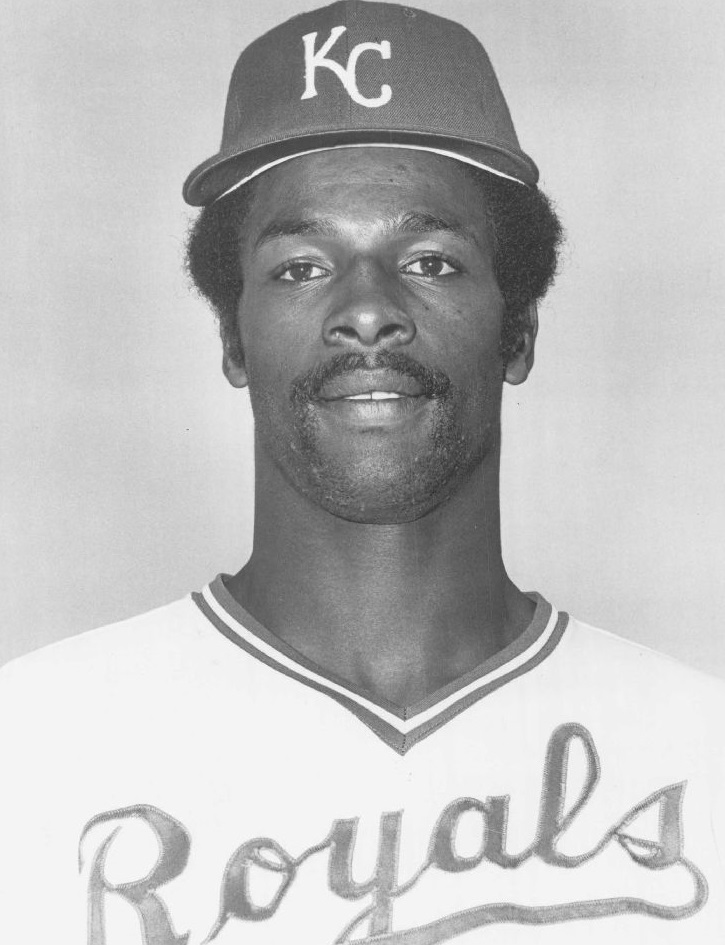
Willie Wilson, the 1975 MVP, was selected for the 1982 and 1983 MLB All-Star Games.

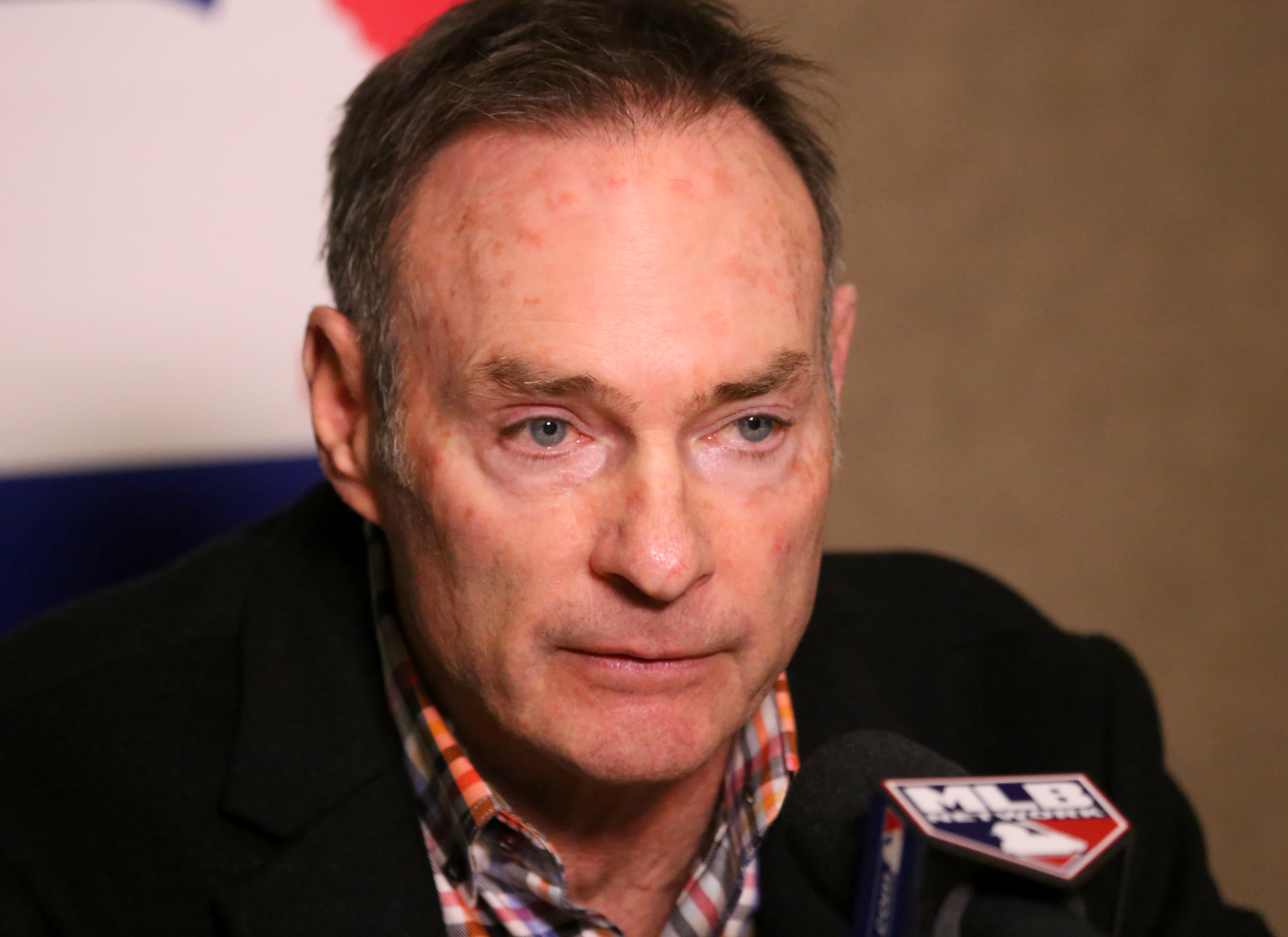
Paul Molitor, the 1977 winner, was inducted into the Baseball Hall of Fame in 2004.

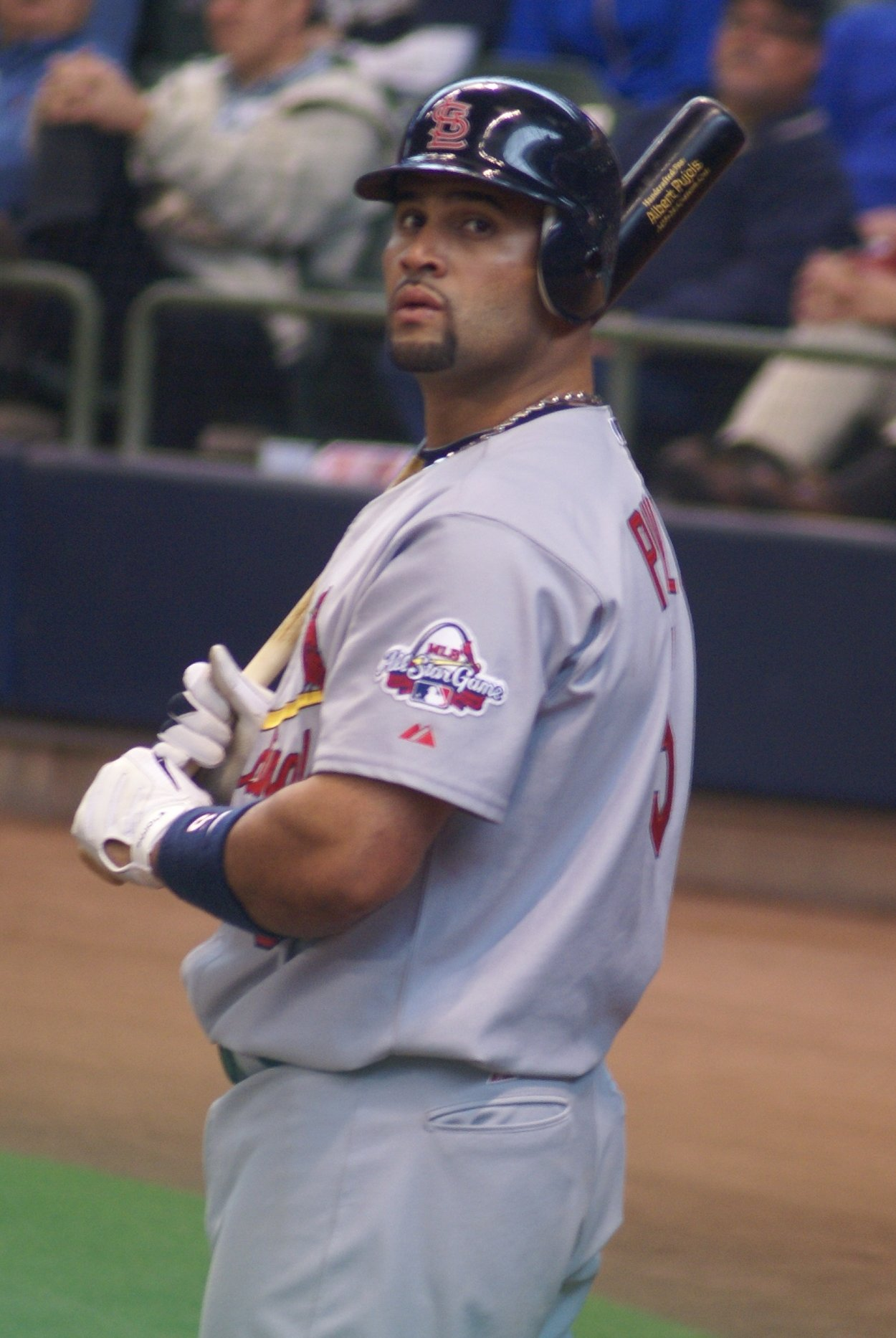
Albert Pujols, the 2000 MVP, won the National League Rookie of the Year Award in 2001 and the NL MVP Award in 2005, 2008, and 2009.

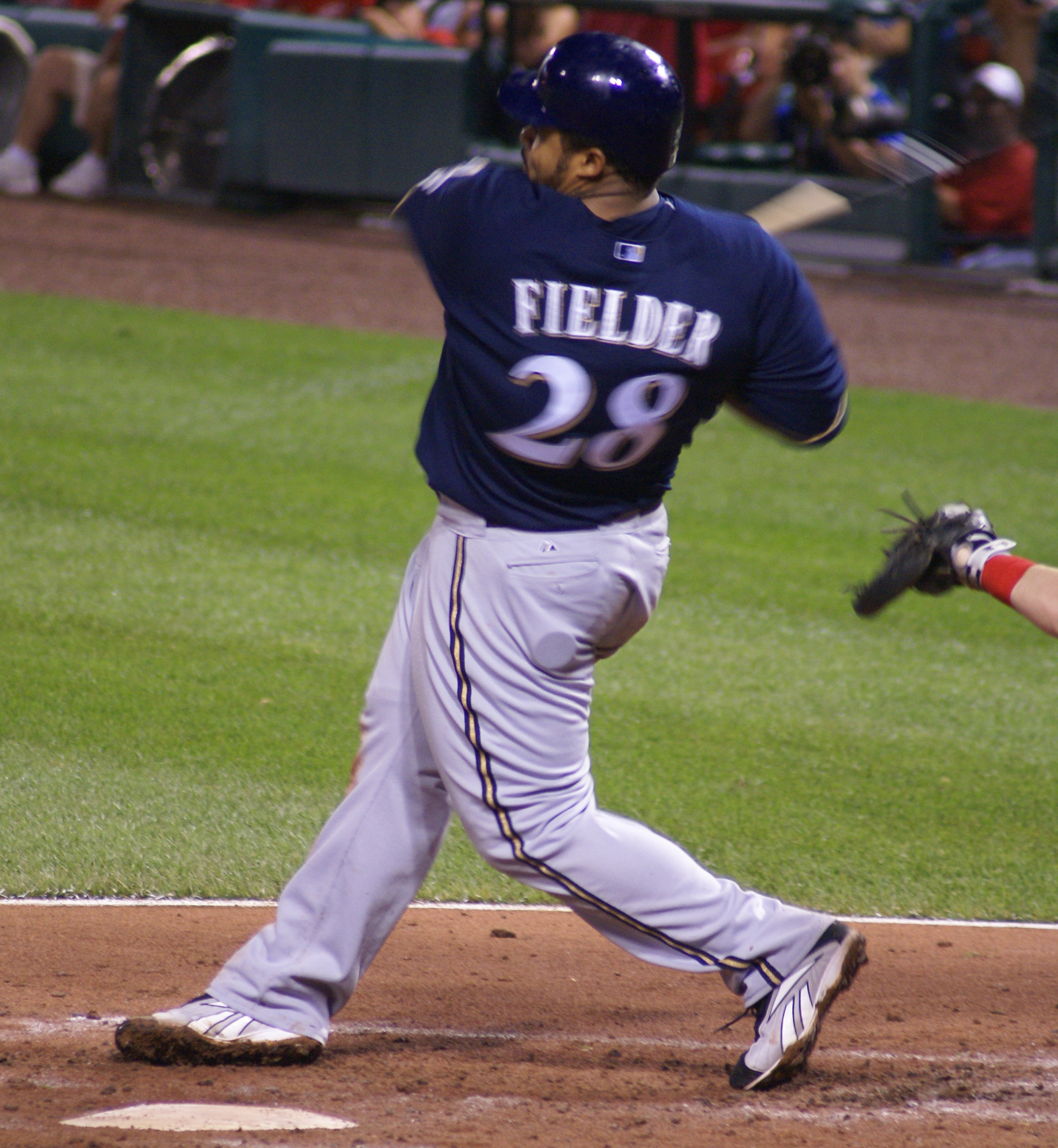
Prince Fielder, the 2000 winner, became a six-time MLB All-Star.

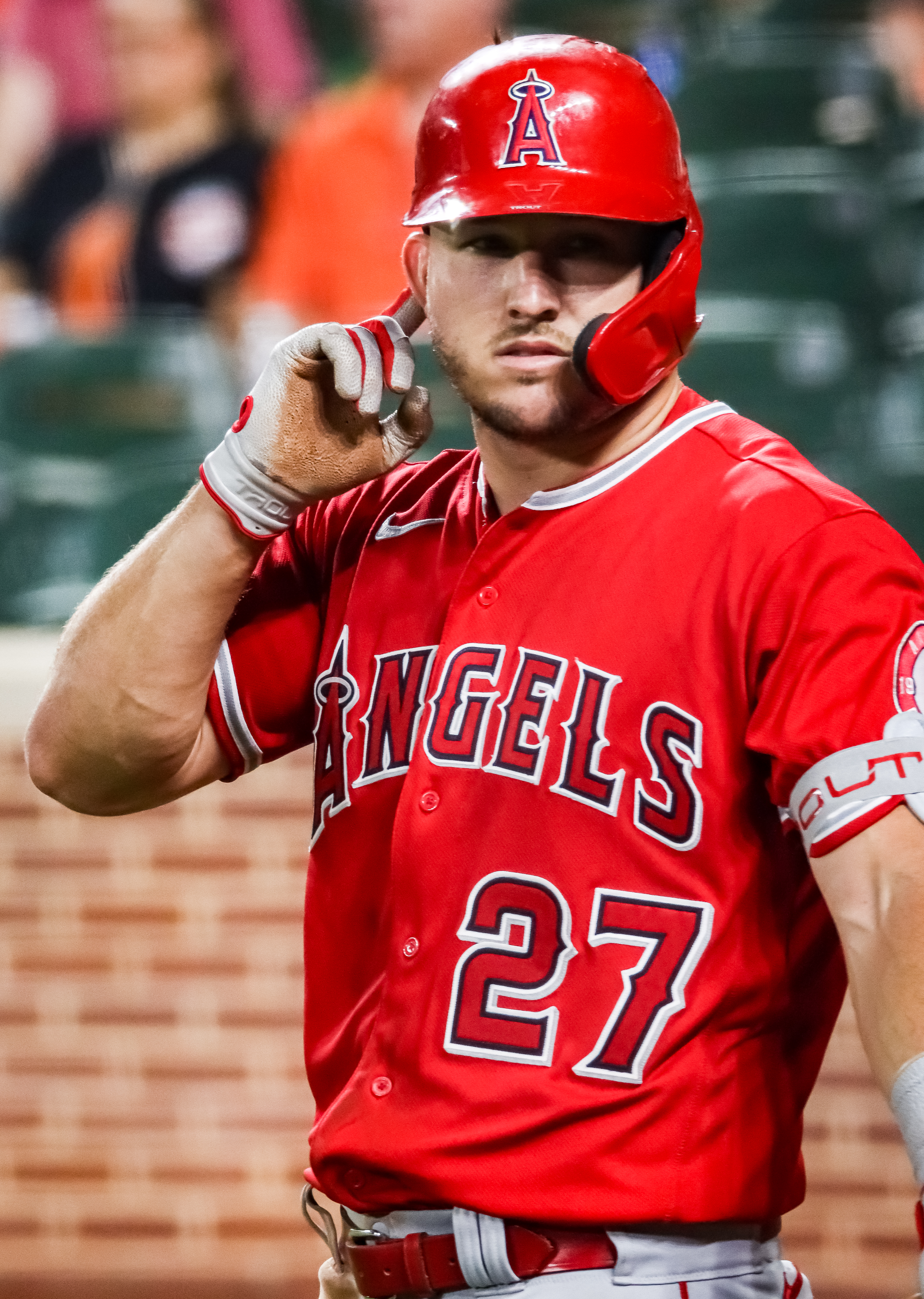
Mike Trout, the 2010 MVP, won the American League Rookie of the Year Award in 2012 and the AL MVP Award in 2014, 2016, and 2019.

Key
Position	Indicates the player's primary position
^	Indicates multiple award winners in the same year

Winners
Year	Winner	Team	Organization	Position	Ref(s).
1956	Deacon Jones	Dubuque Packers	Chicago White Sox	Second baseman	
1957	None selected				
1958	Gus Sancimino	Kokomo Dodgers	Los Angeles Dodgers	Outfielder	
1959	Joel McDaniel	Decatur Commodores	Detroit Tigers	Pitcher	
1960	Thomas Haake	Dubuque Packers	Pittsburgh Pirates	Pitcher	
1961	Hector Cardenas	Dubuque Packers	Cleveland Indians	Outfielder	
1962	Tony Torchia	Midwest Dodgers	Los Angeles Dodgers	First baseman	
1963	None selected				
1964	None selected				
1965	None selected				
1966	None selected				
1967	None selected				
1968	None selected				
1969	None selected				
1970	None selected				
1971	None selected				
1972	None selected				
1973	None selected				
1974	None selected				
1975	Willie Wilson	Waterloo Royals	Kansas City Royals	Outfielder	
1976	Wayne Cato	Cedar Rapids Giants	San Francisco Giants	Catcher	
1977	Paul Molitor	Burlington Bees	Milwaukee Brewers	Shortstop	
1978	Bill Foley	Burlington Bees	Milwaukee Brewers	Catcher	
1979	Dave Stockstill	Wausau Timbers	Chicago Cubs	Outfielder	
1980	Von Hayes	Waterloo Indians	Cleveland Indians	Third baseman	
1981	Ed Saavedra	Waterloo Indians	Cleveland Indians	Outfielder	
1982	Tom Romano	Madison Muskies	Oakland Athletics	Outfielder	
1983	Curt Ford	Springfield Cardinals	St. Louis Cardinals	Outfielder	
1984	Joey Meyer	Beloit Brewers	Milwaukee Brewers	First baseman	
1985	Eddie Williams	Cedar Rapids Reds	Cincinnati Reds	Third baseman	
1986	Luis Medina	Waterloo Indians	Cleveland Indians	Outfielder	
1987^	Greg Vaughn	Beloit Brewers	Milwaukee Brewers	Outfielder	
1987^	Todd Zeile	Springfield Cardinals	St. Louis Cardinals	Catcher	
1988	Lenny Webster	Kenosha Twins	Minnesota Twins	Catcher	
1989	Tom Redington	Burlington Braves	Atlanta Braves	Third baseman	
1990	Reggie Sanders	Cedar Rapids Reds	Cincinnati Reds	Outfielder	
1991	Salomón Torres	Clinton Giants	San Francisco Giants	Pitcher	
1992	Steve Gibralter	Cedar Rapids Reds	Cincinnati Reds	Outfielder	
1993	Joe Biasucci	Springfield Cardinals	St. Louis Cardinals	Second baseman	
1994	Sal Fasano	Rockford Royals	Kansas City Royals	Catcher	
1995	Jesus Ibarra	Burlington Bees	San Francisco Giants	First baseman	
1996	Larry Barnes	Cedar Rapids Kernels	California Angels	First baseman	
1997	Robert Fick	West Michigan Whitecaps	Detroit Tigers	First baseman	
1998	Pablo Ozuna	Peoria Chiefs	St. Louis Cardinals	Shortstop	
1999	Aaron McNeal	Michigan Battle Cats	Houston Astros	First baseman	
2000	Albert Pujols	Peoria Chiefs	St. Louis Cardinals	Third baseman	
2001	Adrián González	Kane County Cougars	Florida Marlins	First baseman	
2002	Jason Stokes	Kane County Cougars	Florida Marlins	First baseman	
2003	Prince Fielder	Beloit Snappers	Milwaukee Brewers	First baseman	
2004	Brian Dopirak	Lansing Lugnuts	Chicago Cubs	First baseman	
2005	Carlos González	South Bend Silver Hawks	Arizona Diamondbacks	Outfielder	
2006	Jeff Baisley	Kane County Cougars	Oakland Athletics	Third baseman	
2007	Gorkys Hernández	West Michigan Whitecaps	Detroit Tigers	Outfielder	
2008	Ben Revere	Beloit Snappers	Minnesota Twins	Outfielder	
2009^	Dee Strange-Gordon	Great Lakes Loons	Los Angeles Dodgers	Shortstop	
2009^	Kyle Russell	Great Lakes Loons	Los Angeles Dodgers	Outfielder	
2010	Mike Trout	Cedar Rapids Kernels	Los Angeles Angels of Anaheim	Outfielder	
2011	Rymer Liriano	Fort Wayne TinCaps	San Diego Padres	Outfielder	
2012	Kevin Pillar	Lansing Lugnuts	Toronto Blue Jays	Outfielder	
2013	Byron Buxton	Cedar Rapids Kernels	Minnesota Twins	Outfielder	
2014	Wynton Bernard	West Michigan Whitecaps	Detroit Tigers	Outfielder	
2015	Ryan McBroom	Lansing Lugnuts	Toronto Blue Jays	First baseman	
2016	Eloy Jiménez	South Bend Cubs	Chicago Cubs	Outfielder	
2017	Bo Bichette	Lansing Lugnuts	Toronto Blue Jays	Shortstop	
2018	Elehuris Montero	Peoria Chiefs	St. Louis Cardinals	Third baseman	
2019	Alek Thomas	Kane County Cougars	Arizona Diamondbacks	Outfielder	
2020	None selected (season cancelled due to COVID-19 pandemic)				
2021	Andy Pages	Great Lakes Loons	Los Angeles Dodgers	Outfielder	
2022	Christian Encarnacion-Strand	Cedar Rapids Kernels	Minnesota Twins	Third baseman	
2023	Kala'i Rosario	Cedar Rapids Kernels	Minnesota Twins	Outfielder	
2024	Cooper Ingle	Lake County Captains	Cleveland Guardians	Catcher	
2025	Izaac Pacheco	West Michigan Whitecaps	Detroit Tigers	Third baseman	
2026	Charles Davalan	Great Lakes Loons	Los Angeles Dodgers	Outfielder	

== Wins by team ==
Active Midwest League teams appear in bold.

Team	Award(s)	Year(s)
**Cedar Rapids Kernels** (Cedar Rapids Giants/Reds)	9	1976, 1985, 1990, 1992, 1996, 2010, 2013, 2022, 2023
**Beloit Sky Carp** (Beloit Brewers/Snappers)	4	1984, 1987, 2003, 2008
Burlington Bees (Burlington Braves)	4	1977, 1978, 1989, 1995
**Great Lakes Loons**	4	2009, (Note: Two players from Great Lakes were selected as MVPs in 2009.) 2021, 2026
Kane County Cougars	4	2001, 2002, 2006, 2019
**Lansing Lugnuts**	4	2004, 2012, 2015, 2017
Waterloo Indians (Waterloo Royals)	4	1975, 1980, 1981, 1986
**West Michigan Whitecaps**	4	1997, 2007, 2014, 2025
Dubuque Packers	3	1956, 1960, 1961
**Peoria Chiefs**	3	1998, 2000, 2018
Springfield Cardinals	3	1983, 1987, 1993
**South Bend Cubs** (South Bend Silver Hawks)	2	2005, 2016
Clinton Giants	1	1991
Decatur Commodores	1	1959
**Fort Wayne TinCaps**	1	2011
Kenosha Twins	1	1988
Kokomo Dodgers	1	1958
**Lake County Captains**	1	2024
Madison Muskies	1	1982
Michigan Battle Cats	1	1999
Midwest Dodgers	1	1962
Rockford Royals	1	1994
Wausau Timbers	1	1979

== Wins by organization ==
Active Midwest League–Major League Baseball affiliations appear in bold.

Organization	Award(s)	Year(s)
**Los Angeles Dodgers**	6	1958, 1962, 2009, (Note: Two players from the Los Angeles organization were selected as MVPs in 2009.) 2021, 2026
**St. Louis Cardinals**	6	1983, 1987, 1993, 1998, 2000, 2018
**Cleveland Guardians** (Cleveland Indians)	5	1961, 1980, 1981, 1986, 2024
**Detroit Tigers**	5	1959, 1997, 2007, 2014, 2025
**Milwaukee Brewers**	5	1977, 1978, 1984, 1987, 2003
**Minnesota Twins**	5	1988, 2008, 2013, 2022, 2023
**Chicago Cubs**	3	1979, 2004, 2016
**Cincinnati Reds**	3	1985, 1990, 1992
San Francisco Giants	3	1976, 1991, 1995
Toronto Blue Jays	3	2012, 2015, 2017
Arizona Diamondbacks	2	2005, 2019
**Kansas City Royals**	2	1975, 1994
Los Angeles Angels (California Angels)	2	1996, 2010
**Miami Marlins** (Florida Marlins)	2	2001, 2002
**Oakland Athletics**	2	1982, 2006
Atlanta Braves	1	1989
Chicago White Sox	1	1956
Houston Astros	1	1999
Pittsburgh Pirates	1	1960
**San Diego Padres**	1	2011
