= Double (baseball) =

Two-base hit in baseball

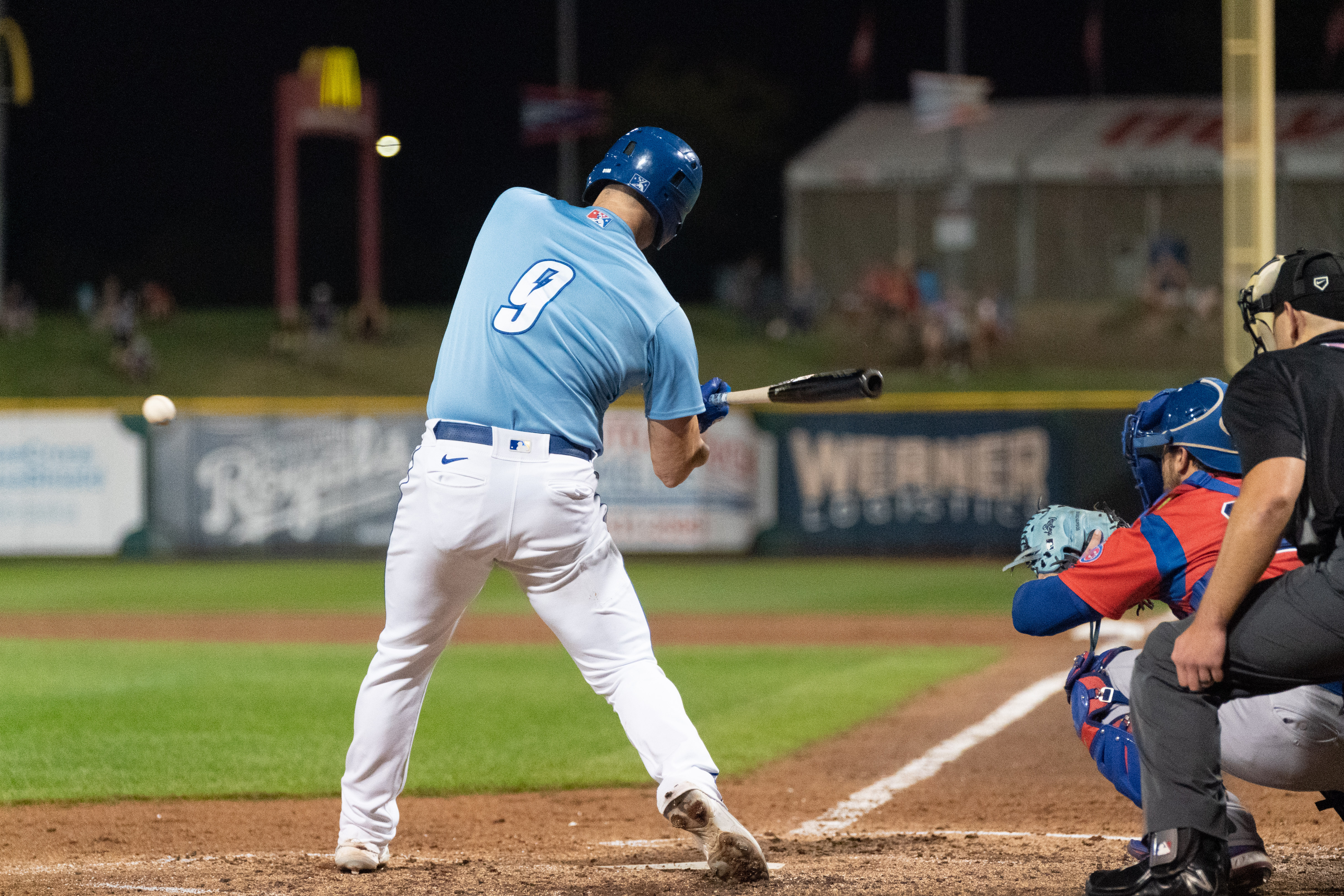
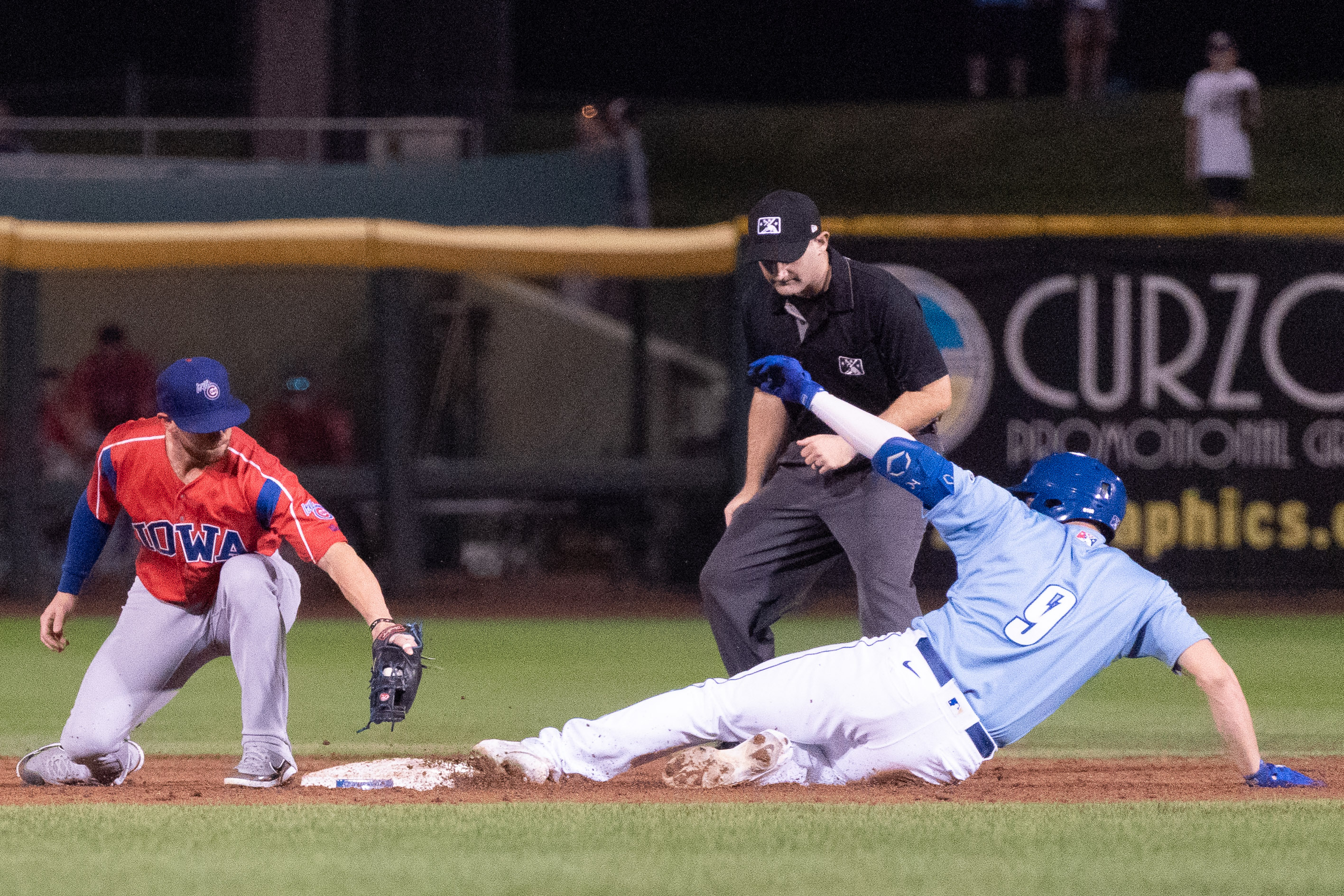
Ryan McBroom hits a pitch for a double in 2021.

In baseball, a double is the act of a batter striking the pitched ball and safely reaching second base without being called out by the umpire, without the benefit of a fielder's misplay (see error) or another runner being put out on a fielder's choice. A double is a type of hit (the others being the single, triple and home run) and is sometimes called a "two-bagger" or "two-base hit". For statistical and scorekeeping purposes it is denoted by 2B.

== Description ==
Typically, a double is a well-hit ball into the outfield that finds the "gap" between the center fielder and one of the corner outfielders, bounces off the outfield wall and down into the field of play, or is hit up one of the two foul lines. To hit many doubles, a batter must have decent hitting skill and power; it also helps to run well enough to beat an outfield throw. Many of the best double hitting batters were revered for high baseball IQ and the ability to slide well and turn a single into an extra-base hit.

Doubles typically drive in runs from third base, second base, and even from first base at times. When total bases and slugging percentages are calculated, the number two is used for the calculation.

Teams sometimes position their fielders in a "no doubles" defense, meaning:

- Outfielders play relatively deep, to minimize the chance that a fly ball can land behind them.
- Corner infielders play close to the foul lines, to minimize the chance that a ground ball can get by them and roll far into an outfield corner.

This defensive alignment is typically seen late in a game, when the team in the field is ahead by one or two runs.

Renowned doubles hitters occasionally acquire a nickname that relates to their doubles hitting, for example "Mitchy Two Bags" (Mitch Moreland) and "Tony Two Bags" (Anthony Rendon).

=== Ground rule double ===
A two-base hit awarded by an umpire when a batted ball is hit fairly and bounces out of play is referred to as a ground rule double. The batter is awarded second base and any runners advance two bases from the base they occupied at the time of the pitch. Prior to 1931, such hits were considered home runs. A two-base hit awarded because the batter hit into a special situation defined in the ground rules is also defined as a ground rule double. An example of this occurs where the rules of Chicago's Wrigley Field award a ground rule double if a batted ball is lost in the vines on the outfield bleacher wall. At the Hubert H. Humphrey Metrodome in Minneapolis, umpires awarded Dave Kingman a ground rule double in a 1984 game, when a ball he hit became stuck in the roof, although no specific ground rule existed for that situation at the Metrodome at the time.

== Major League Baseball records ==
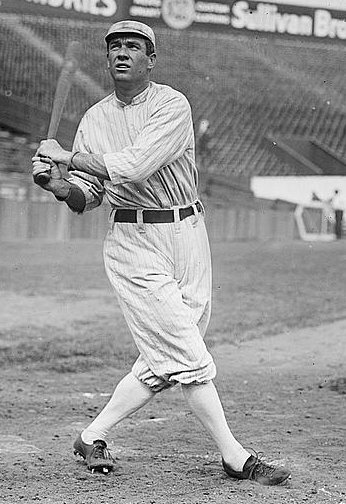
Tris Speaker, who played from 1907 to 1928, hit the most career doubles of anyone in Major League Baseball history, 792.

=== Career ===
The all-time leader in doubles is Tris Speaker, with 792. The following players are the top 10 Major League doubles hitters of all-time:

1. Tris Speaker – 792
2. Pete Rose – 746
3. Stan Musial – 725
4. Ty Cobb – 724
5. Albert Pujols – 684
6. Craig Biggio – 668
7. George Brett – 665
8. Nap Lajoie – 657
9. Carl Yastrzemski – 646
10. Honus Wagner – 640

Derek Jeter has the most career doubles (32) in postseason history.

=== Season ===
Only five players in Major League history have reached 50 or more doubles in a season at least three times: Tris Speaker (1912, 1920–21, 1923, 1926), Paul Waner (1928, 1932, 1936), Stan Musial (1944, 1946, 1953), Brian Roberts (2004, 2008–09) and Albert Pujols (2003–04, 2012).

Individual season leaders:

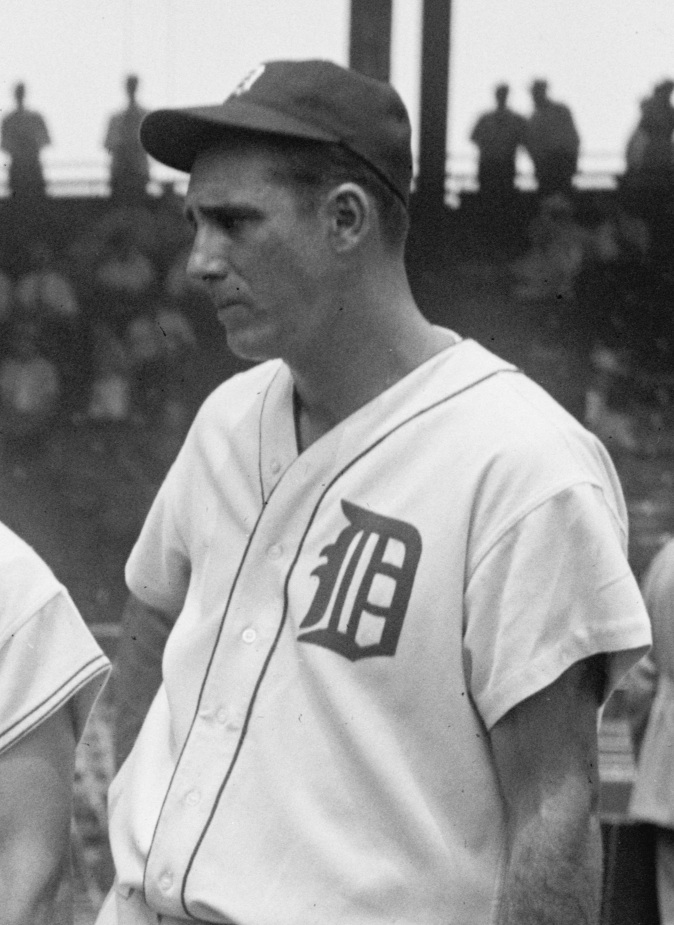
Hank Greenberg, Hall of Famer and 2-time MVP.

1. Earl Webb (1931) – 67
2. George Burns (1926) – 64
3. Joe Medwick (1936) – 64
4. Hank Greenberg (1934) – 63
5. Paul Waner (1932) – 62
6. Charlie Gehringer (1936) – 60

Three players have hit eight doubles in a single postseason: Albert Pujols and David Freese (both 2011) and Ben Zobrist (2015).

=== Game ===
The most doubles hit by a player in a major league game is four. This has been achieved more than 40 times, most recently on April 27, 2022, by Kyle Farmer for the Cincinnati Reds against the San Diego Padres. Only two players—Billy Werber and Albert Belle—have achieved the feat twice. Johnny Damon and Shannon Stewart are the only players to have hit four doubles in interleague play, doing so in separate games on July 18, 2000. The St. Louis Cardinals have recorded the most doubles by a team in one game: they hit 13 doubles in a 17–13 win over the Chicago Cubs on July 12, 1931, in the second game of a doubleheader.

Frank Isbell of the Chicago White Sox hit four doubles in Game 5 of the 1906 World Series, the only time this has been achieved in the postseason. Freddy Sanchez was the first player to hit three doubles in his first three World Series plate appearances, doing so in Game 1 of the 2010 World Series. Later in the game, Sanchez reached second base on a base hit that was initially scored as a double, which would have tied Isbell's World Series and postseason records; the play was later amended to a single and an error, however. The sole player to have twice hit three doubles in a postseason game is Albert Pujols, both times in the 2011 postseason. The most doubles hit in a postseason game by both teams combined is 13, by the New York Yankees and Boston Red Sox in Game 3 of the 2004 ALCS. There have been 13 postseason games that ended with a walk-off double; the most recent was hit by Carlos Correa of the Houston Astros in Game 2 of the 2017 ALCS. The 1924 and 1929 World Series were both won via a game-ending RBI double.

Nine players have hit two doubles in an All-Star Game, most recently Jonathan Lucroy in the 2014 edition.

=== Consecutive games ===
Bo Bichette hit a double in a record nine consecutive games in 2019.

=== Pitching ===
Among MLB pitchers, Earl Whitehill of the Washington Senators has given up the most doubles in a game. The Detroit Tigers hit 10 doubles against him on July 10, 1935. Robin Roberts holds the single-season record for doubles conceded (70 in 1953), while the career record of 820 doubles allowed belongs to Jamie Moyer.

== See also ==
- The Double (Seattle Mariners), one of the most famous doubles in baseball history
- Single (baseball)
- Triple (baseball)
- Home Run
