= Kala'i Rosario =

Free agent
- Outfielder
- Born: July 2, 2002 (age 24); Papaikou, Hawaii, U.S.
- Bats: Right Throws: Right

Kala'i Ho'okele Rosario (born July 2, 2002) is an American professional baseball outfielder who is a free agent.

== Career ==
Rosario attended Waiākea High School in Hilo, Hawaii. He was drafted by the Minnesota Twins in the fifth round (158th overall) of the 2020 Major League Baseball draft. He signed with the Twins, but did not play in a game that year due to the cancellation of the minor league season because of the COVID-19 pandemic. He made his professional debut that year with the rookie-level Florida Complex League Twins in 2021.

Rosario played for the Single-A Fort Myers Mighty Mussels in 2022, hitting .239/.320/.408 with 12 home runs and 46 RBI across 109 appearances. He began the 2023 campaign with the High-A Cedar Rapids Kernels. He won the 2023 Midwest League Most Valuable Player Award with Ceder Rapids, after batting .252/.364/.467.

Rosario made 70 appearances for Fort Myers and the Double-A Wichita Wind Surge in 2024, batting a cumulative .238/.329/.428 with 10 home runs, 37 RBI, and three stolen bases. He returned to Wichita for the 2025 season, playing in 130 games and slashing .256/.358/.487 with 25 home runs, 83 RBI, and 32 stolen bases. In 2026, he played 100 games between Wichita and the Triple-A St. Paul Saints and batted .260 with 22 home runs and 54 RBI. He elected free agency on November 2, 2026.
