= Ben Revere =

American baseball player (born 1988)

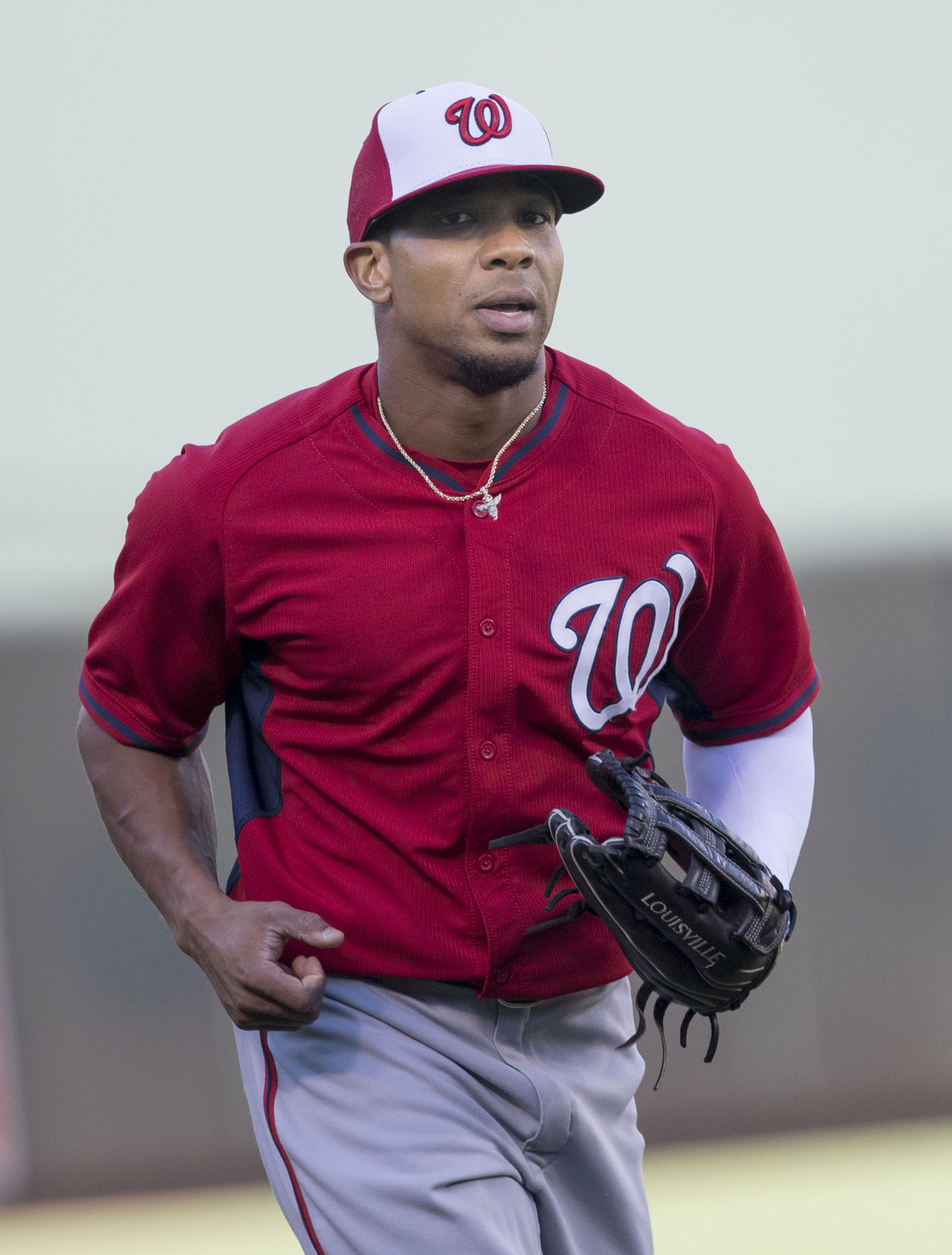
- Revere with the Washington Nationals in 2016
- Outfielder
- Born: May 3, 1988 (age 38); Atlanta, Georgia, U.S.
- Batted: Left Threw: Right

MLB debut
- September 7, 2010, for the Minnesota Twins

Last MLB appearance
- October 1, 2017, for the Los Angeles Angels

MLB statistics
- Batting average: .284
- Home runs: 7
- Runs batted in: 198
- Stolen bases: 211
- Stats at Baseball Reference

Teams
- Minnesota Twins (2010–2012); Philadelphia Phillies (2013–2015); Toronto Blue Jays (2015); Washington Nationals (2016); Los Angeles Angels (2017)

Ben Daniel Revere (born May 3, 1988) is an American former professional baseball outfielder. He played in Major League Baseball (MLB) for the Minnesota Twins, Philadelphia Phillies, Toronto Blue Jays, Washington Nationals, and Los Angeles Angels.

Revere played baseball at Lexington Catholic High School, where he received several awards during his junior and senior seasons. Revere was selected in the first round of the 2007 Major League Baseball draft by the Minnesota Twins and played in their farm system for three seasons before being called up to Major League Baseball in late 2010. He played with the Twins for two more seasons before being traded to the Phillies in the 2012 offseason.

Revere began the 2013 season as the Phillies' leadoff hitter before suffering an injury and being moved down in the lineup. His primary strengths were his speed and his defense; he struggled to hit for power, hitting just seven home runs in the major leagues. Writers and teammates have described Revere as being a genuine, goofy, energetic player.

== Early life ==
Revere was born in Atlanta and raised in LaGrange, Georgia. In the early 2000s, he moved to Richmond, Kentucky, where he attended Lexington Catholic High School from 2003 to 2007. He led the varsity baseball team to a state championship his junior season (2006), and was named most valuable player. After his senior season, he was named the Gatorade Kentucky Baseball Player of the Year, 2007 Mr. Baseball for Kentucky, and a member of the All-USA Today high school baseball team. The Minnesota Twins selected him in the first round (28th overall pick) of the 2007 Major League Baseball draft and signed shortly thereafter. He had previously committed to play college baseball at Georgia.

== Professional career ==
=== Minnesota Twins ===
==== Minor leagues ====
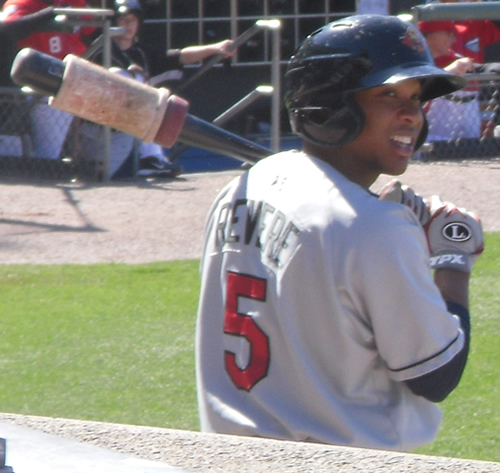
Revere on deck for Rochester Red Wings in April 2011

After his first-round selection, the Twins assigned Revere to the Gulf Coast League Twins, with whom he posted a .325 batting average (BA) in his first season of professional ball, and was named a 2007 Gulf Coast League Postseason All-Star. The following season with the Beloit Snappers of the Single-A Midwest League, Revere's batting average increased to .379 with 44 stolen bases and ten triples. He won several awards for his performance, including a Midwest League All-Star selection, Mid-season MVP, Postseason All-Star, Most Valuable Player, Prospect of the Year, and the Sherry Robertson Award as Twins' minor league player of the year. Baseball America placed him on their 2008 High-A All-Star team and called him the Twins' second best prospect, behind Aaron Hicks.

Revere began the 2009 season with the Fort Myers Miracle of the Florida State League (FSL). In the first half of the season, he batted .342 with 23 RBI, 32 runs scored and 22 stolen bases. He was named the FSL Player of the Week for May 11–17, and was an All-Star for the FSL's Southern division. He did not commit an error all season in 225 chances playing both center field and left field. He finished the season with a .311 batting average, two home runs, and 48 RBI.

Before the season, Baseball America ranked him the Twins' fifth-best prospect. Revere began the 2010 season with the New Britain Rock Cats of the Double-A Eastern League. He was named the Twins minor league player of the month in May after hitting .336 with 6 doubles, a home run, and 15 runs batted in (RBI). He played in the 2007 All-Star Futures Game at Angel Stadium in Anaheim. After totaling a .305 BA with 36 stolen bases during the season, his contract was purchased by the Twins on September 4, 2010.

==== Major leagues ====
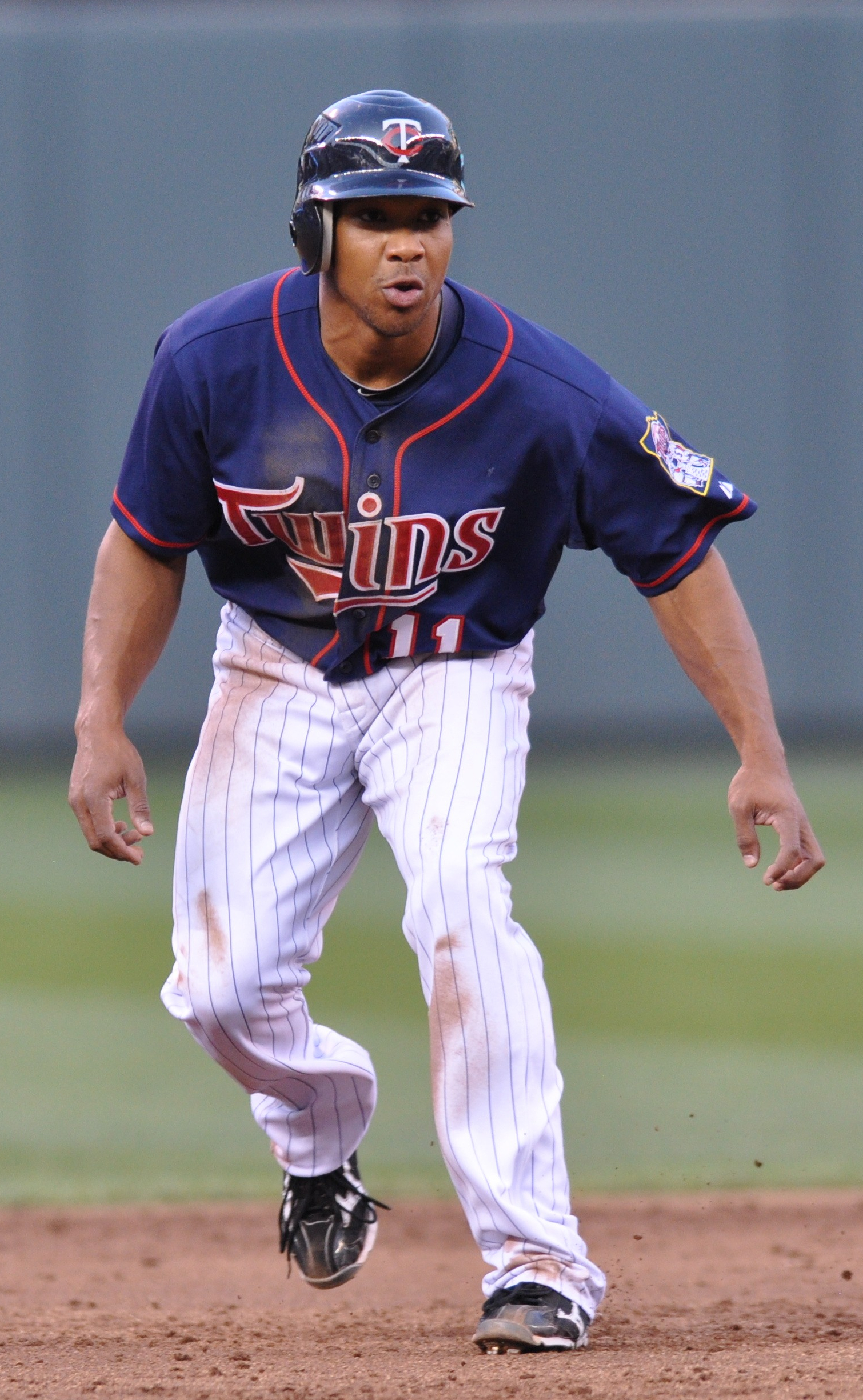
Revere with the Minnesota Twins in 2012

Revere made his major league debut on September 7, 2010, as a pinch hitter for Denard Span, striking out against Kansas City Royals' pitcher Jesse Chavez. He remained in the game, replacing Span in center field. He recorded his first major league run batted in (RBI) on September 18, when he grounded out to score J. J. Hardy in a game against the Oakland Athletics. He recorded his first major league hit a day later.

Revere began the 2011 season with the Twins' Triple-A affiliate, the Rochester Red Wings of the International League. In May, Revere was called up to Minnesota to play left field for the injured Delmon Young. Soon after Young's return, Span was placed on the seven-day disabled list with a concussion. As a result, Revere was given another position to play.

In late 2012, Revere amassed a 21-game hitting streak, his career best. He finished the 2012 season playing 124 major league games with a .294 batting average, no home runs, and 32 RBIs.

=== Philadelphia Phillies ===
On December 6, 2012, Revere was traded to the Philadelphia Phillies in exchange for Vance Worley and Trevor May. Revere was picked to lead off the Phillies' Opening Day lineup for the 2013 season against the Atlanta Braves over Jimmy Rollins after a strong spring training performance. After acquiring Revere, Phillies General Manager (GM) Rubén Amaro Jr. said, "He can go to the top of the order or bottom of the order. Either way, for us it was about the defense and the speed. We like athletic players and he's certainly that. He has great energy, a fantastic defender. And those are priorities for us."

On April 15, 2013, the day of the Boston Marathon bombing, Revere inscribed "Pray for Boston" onto a piece of masking tape and taped it to his glove, which he left sitting out while he stretched. A photographer from Getty Images photographed the glove, and Revere later commented that his phone was "ringing off the hook" with thanks for the gesture. Revere commented,

"A bunch of people who live in Boston said it was all over the news out there", Revere said. "I just showed my appreciation. Even when I'm playing, I'm thinking of the people in Boston. It's just terrible that it happened. For me, I'm just playing the game for them a little bit."

In the subsequent game, Revere made an incredible leaping, diving catch with the glove, robbing Todd Frazier of an extra base hit.

Near the beginning of the season, Revere sustained an injury to his quadriceps that he worsened in the April 24 game against the Pittsburgh Pirates. He missed multiple consecutive games and was replaced in the lineup by Freddy Galvis. Revere finally returned on May 3, his 25th birthday. He injured his elbow in a game against the Boston Red Sox on May 27 after jamming it into the metal fence at Fenway Park. He remained in the game, and x-rays later turned up negative. Revere later said of the injury, "Luckily, I've got strong enough bones. If it was somebody else it may have been bad, but luckily it wasn't serious."

By the end of May, Revere was back hitting mainly at the top of the order after manager Charlie Manuel decided to adjust the lineup in hopes of sparking some offense. He managed two hits in a game against the Miami Marlins on June 3, stole two bases, and stopped an extra-base hit from Adeiny Hechavarria. "I just have to take it one game at a time and not put any pressure on myself. I'm finding my stroke", Revere later said of the game. On July 13, Revere suffered a fractured foot after a foul ball hit him while at-bat. He had surgery for the fracture on July 16. Although the initial timetable for Revere's return was six to eight weeks, the Phillies official website later published an article stating that there was no timetable for his return and they were unsure whether or not he will return for a remainder of the 2013 season. He ended up missing the rest of the 2013 season, and finished with a .305 batting average, 0 home runs, 17 runs batted in and 22 stolen bases.

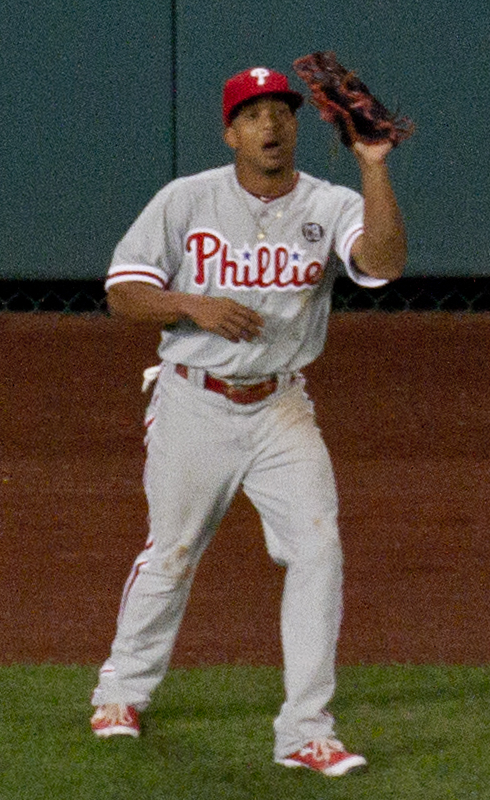
Revere playing for the Philadelphia Phillies in 2014

Revere entered the 2014 season healthy, and, amidst chaos and position battles elsewhere, he was the preeminent starter in center field. Before the season, Pat Egan of Phillies Nation published an article declaring the Phillies as the clear winners of the trade that brought Revere to Philadelphia. Though initially writers thought the Twins received a terrific return and it was a terrible trade for the Phillies, Worley was ultimately outrighted of the Twins' roster and traded, and May's status as a top prospect languished, whereas Revere had emerged as a viable everyday center fielder who was under contract with the Phillies through 2018. On April 1, 2014, Revere set a new MLB record for most plate appearances without a home run (1,410) by a non-pitcher. Despite his initial preeminence, because of sore ribs (caused by a diving catch in the outfield), backup Tony Gwynn Jr. started four consecutive games in center field (beyond the time Revere needed to recover from his injury due to Gwynn's success at the plate) while Revere, who had recently struggled at the plate, was on the bench. However, a few days later, Revere came up to bat in the eighth inning in a scoreless game, and hit an RBI single, which re-implanted him atop the Phillies' starting lineup. As for Gwynn, Revere commented,

We're kind of the same player. He's like my older brother. If I do something wrong, he's right there telling me how to correct myself. I'm the same way with him. If I see something, I tell him. He's definitely a great motivator for me. I just learn from him, since he's been in the game for a while. I'm still learning. I kind of just watched him those few days to help me out and improve my game, and he watches me to improve his. We kind of feed off each other

— Ben Revere, excerpt from Revere's sharp effort at the plate lifts Phillies over Braves from The Philadelphia Daily News, April 18, 2014

On May 27, 2014, Revere hit his first MLB home run in his 1,466th career at-bat, the longest streak without a home run to begin a career since Frank Taveras in 1977. On September 5, Revere hit another home run, the second of his career, against Washington Nationals right-handed pitcher Rafael Soriano. In the waning weeks of the season, Revere was firmly embroiled in the battle for the National League batting title with Justin Morneau, Josh Harrison, and others. In 151 games of 2014, Revere hit .306 with an NL-leading 184 hits, 49 stolen bases, two home runs, and 28 RBIs. Paul Boye wrote, "The fact of the matter boils down to this: Ben Revere is the best option in center field for this team, given both internal and external options at this point." On October 1, 2014, Revere underwent right ankle surgery to remove two screws.

After having played center field exclusively during his first two years with the Phillies, Revere spent some time in left field during spring training in 2015 while Odubel Herrera played in center; manager Ryne Sandberg noted that Revere's arm may fit better in left field. In 96 games with the Phillies, Revere batted .298 with 24 stolen bases, 1 home run, and 26 RBI.

=== Toronto Blue Jays ===
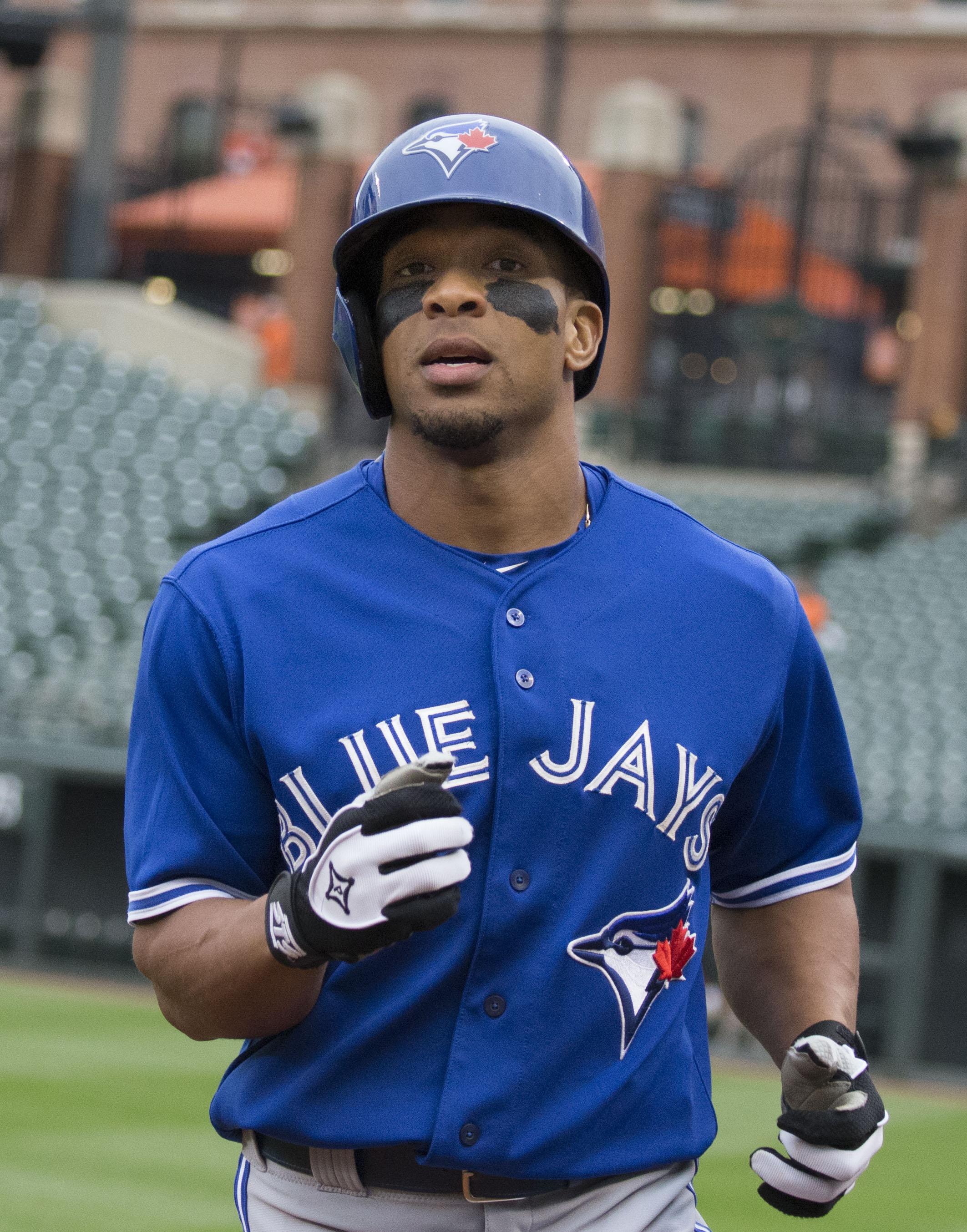
Revere with the Toronto Blue Jays in 2015

On July 31, 2015, Revere was traded to the Toronto Blue Jays for Alberto Tirado and Jimmy Cordero. Revere struggled early in his tenure with the Blue Jays, going hitless in his first 13 at-bats. He would return to form for the remainder of August, making several highlight-reel catches in left field and extending a hit streak to 9 games on August 29. During those 9 games, Revere batted .514. He played in 56 games for the Blue Jays in the 2015 regular season, and batted .319 with 1 home run, 19 RBI, and 7 stolen bases. He played 152 total games in 2015 with a .306 batting average, 2 home runs, 31 stolen bases, and 45 RBI.

With the Blue Jays finishing the season 93–69, the team clinched the AL-East pennant for their first postseason berth in 22 years. During Game 6 of the 2015 ALCS against the Kansas City Royals, Revere was involved in controversy where Jeff Nelson called a strike on a pitch that was up and outside on a 2–1 count. The very next pitch, Revere struck out swinging. He attacked a garbage can with his bat in frustration in the dugout, and the Blue Jays would end up losing the game 3–4, eliminating them from further postseason contention. In 11 postseason games, Revere batted .256 with 2 stolen bases.

=== Washington Nationals ===
On January 8, 2016, Revere and a player to be named later were traded to the Washington Nationals in exchange for Drew Storen and cash considerations. Revere was placed on the 15-day disabled list on April 6 after suffering a strained right oblique in the season opener on April 4. In 103 appearances for Washington, he slashed .217/.260/.300 with two home runs, 24 RBI, and 14 stolen bases. On December 2, the Nationals non-tendered Revere, making him a free agent.

=== Los Angeles Angels ===
On December 23, 2016, Revere signed a one-year, $4 million contract with the Los Angeles Angels that included unspecified incentives. Revere began the 2017 season as the team's fourth outfielder but after inconsistent play, Revere was entrusted as the left fielder. In 109 games, Revere hit .275/.308/.344 with 1 home run and 21 stolen bases.

On February 25, 2018, Revere signed a minor league contract with the Cincinnati Reds. He was released prior to the start of the season on March 25.

On March 30, 2018, Revere signed a minor league contract to return to the Angels. In 40 games for the Triple-A Salt Lake Bees, he slashed .277/.319/.407 with three home runs, 18 RBI, and two stolen bases. Revere was released by the Angels organization on July 26.

=== Toronto Blue Jays (second stint) ===
On February 17, 2019, Revere signed a minor league contract with the Texas Rangers that included an invitation to spring training. The Rangers released Revere on March 26.

On April 27, 2019, Revere signed a minor league contract with the Toronto Blue Jays. In 8 games for the Triple-A Buffalo Bisons, he went 10-for-35 (.286) with 6 RBI and 1 stolen base. Revere was released by the Blue Jays organization on May 22.

=== Lexington Legends ===
During the COVID-19 pandemic, Revere played with the Lexington Legends during their "Battle of the Bourbon Trail" series due to the cancellation of the 2020 MiLB season.

==== Player-coach ====
On May 18, 2021, Revere was named hitting coach for the Lexington Legends (now members of the independent Atlantic League of Professional Baseball) for the 2021 season.

On July 31, 2021, the team activated Revere as a player. In his first game, he went 2-for-3 with a triple and two RBI. Revere did not return to the organization after the season. In 25 games, he hit .300/.333/.380 with no home runs, 14 RBI, and one stolen base.

== Coaching career ==
On February 17, 2023, it was announced that Revere would be joining the Florida Complex League Braves, the rookie-level affiliate of the Atlanta Braves, as a coach for the 2023 season.

== Scouting report ==
=== Offense ===
Revere's former teammate Denard Span described him as having the "ability to change games with his speed both offensively and defensively" and saying that he is always "looking to steal second and third" to gain offense momentum. A slap hitter, he has struggled to hit for power during his career; it took him 1,466 at-bats to hit his first home run, the most since 1977. According to a hot zone chart generated by ESPN Stats and Information, Revere has the best batting average and slugging percentage on pitches on the lower-outside part of the plate. Revere hits left-handed pitchers as well as he does right-handed pitchers. Lindy's Sports noted that despite having a long swing with a "big timing hitch", he makes "excellent line-drive contact" and is a productive leadoff hitter with excellent speed. The Baseball Cube's player ratings, which are based solely on statistics on a 0-100 scale, rated Revere as a 98 for contact and a 97 for speed.

=== Defense ===
Defensively, Revere has excellent range in the outfield and, during the 2012 season, amassed a 16.4 ultimate zone rating (UZR), which is well above average. FanGraphs described him as being an "elite" defensive player due to his speed and range. Even when he has struggled offensively, his defense kept him in the lineup during his early career with the Twins as a right fielder and during his 2013 slump with the Phillies. Though Revere used his speed efficiently in covering ground in the outfield, he struggled to produce outs with his below-average arm. In 2014, some writers asserted that his speed covered for poor range in the outfield, and that he was a below-average outfielder.

== Personal life ==
Described by writer Craig Hughner as embodying a "full-throttle" style of play along with a "genuine, charismatic personality", Revere is known for his energy on the field. Revere called his personality a product of the manner in which he was raised, and that he always tries to be "goofy" and to keep things loose. Former teammate Denard Span corroborated Revere being "goofy", that he is a "real good teammate", and that he comes to play the right way every day. Revere is a devout Christian; he says that he prays nightly and reads his Bible weekly. A self-proclaimed history buff, Revere said he wants to explore Philadelphia museums and famous sites when he no longer has to focus so much on baseball.
