= Sal Stewart =

American baseball player (born 2003)

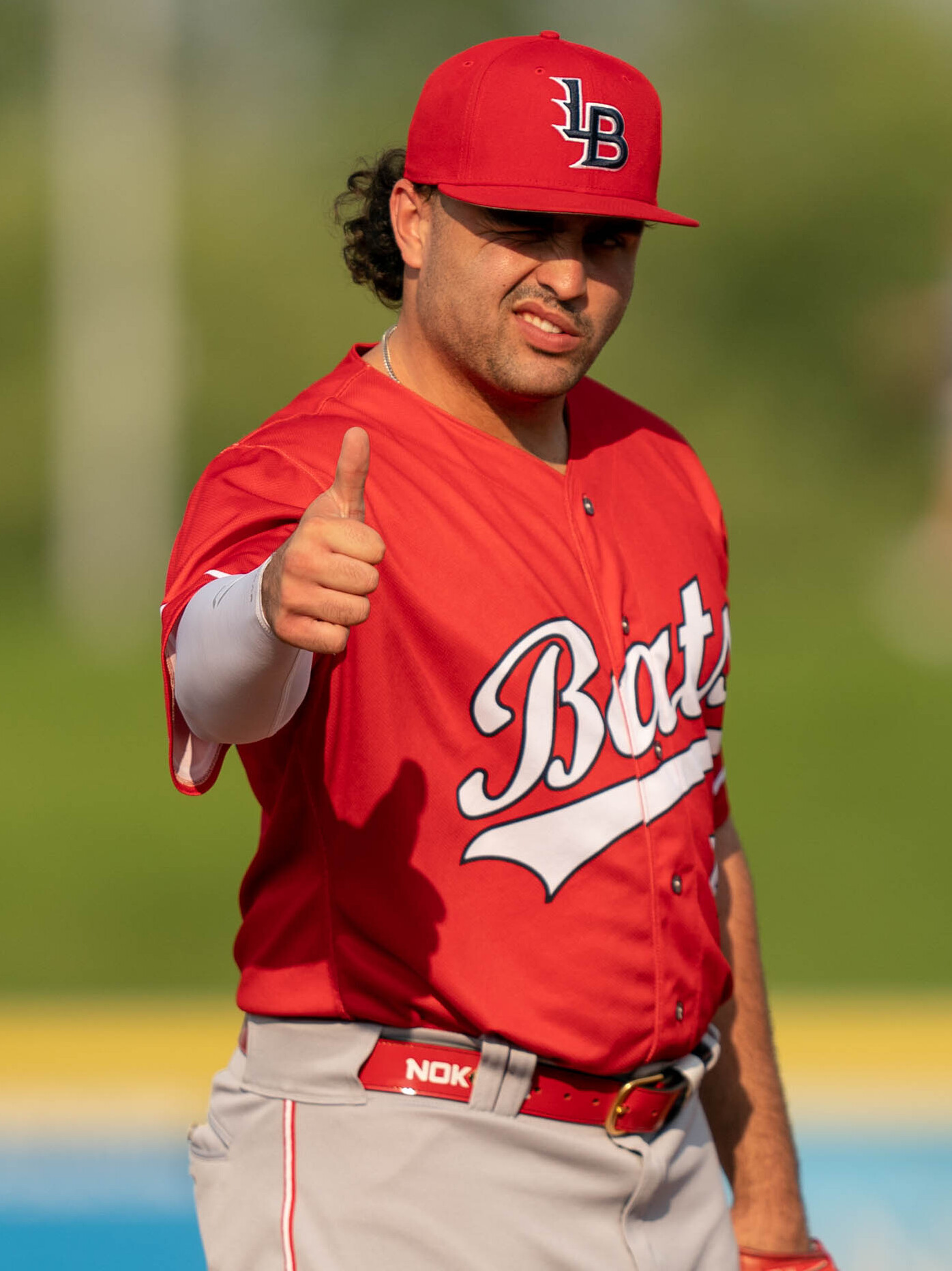
- Stewart with the Louisville Bats in 2025

Cincinnati Reds – No. 27
- First baseman / Third baseman
- Born: December 7, 2003 (age 22); Miami, Florida, U.S.
- Bats: Right Throws: Right

MLB debut
- September 1, 2025, for the Cincinnati Reds

MLB statistics (through 2026 season)
- Batting average: .263
- Home runs: 37
- Runs batted in: 119
- Stats at Baseball Reference

Teams
- Cincinnati Reds (2025–present)

Career highlights and awards
- All-Star (2026); NL Rookie of the Year (2026)

Sal Maxwell Stewart (born December 7, 2003) is an American professional baseball first baseman and third baseman for the Cincinnati Reds of Major League Baseball (MLB). He made his MLB debut in 2025. In 2026, Stewart was named to his first All-Star Game and was also named National League Rookie of the Year.

== Amateur career ==
Stewart attended Westminster Christian School in Palmetto Bay, Florida, where he played baseball and basketball. As a senior in 2022, he batted .514 with nine home runs, 23 RBIs, and 13 doubles. He ended his high school career playing 91 games while recording a .488 batting average, thirty home runs, 95 RBIs, and 31 doubles. After his senior year, he was named to the 2022 All-USA Today HSSA Baseball Team. He committed to play college baseball at Vanderbilt University.

== Professional career ==
=== Minor leagues ===
The Cincinnati Reds selected Stewart with the 32nd overall selection of the 2022 Major League Baseball draft. He signed with the team for $2.1 million.

Stewart made his professional debut in 2022 with the rookie-level Arizona Complex League Reds with whom he batted .295 over eight games. He was assigned to the Daytona Tortugas in Single-A to open the 2023 season. In early August, he was promoted to the High-A Dayton Dragons. Over 117 games between the two affiliates, Stewart batted .275 with 12 home runs and 71 RBI. Stewart remained with Dayton to open the 2024 season. Over eighty games, Stewart hit .279 with eight home runs and 46 RBI before his season was ended in July with a wrist injury. He was assigned to the Double-A Chattanooga Lookouts to open the 2025 season. After the season, Stewart won both the Southern League Most Valuable Player Award and its Top MLB Prospect Award. In July, he was promoted to the Triple-A Louisville Bats. He was selected to represent the Reds (alongside Alfredo Duno) at the 2025 All-Star Futures Game at Truist Park. Over 118 games between Chattanooga and Louisville, Stewart hit .309 with twenty home runs and eighty RBI.

=== Major leagues ===
==== 2025 ====
On August 31, 2025, the Reds announced they would be promoting Stewart to the major leagues for the first time the following day. He made his MLB debut the next day at Great American Ball Park versus the Toronto Blue Jays as Cincinnati's starting first baseman and recorded his first MLB hit, a single off of Chris Bassitt. Stewart recorded his first MLB home run, a two-run home run, on September 6 against Jonah Tong of the New York Mets. Stewart played in 18 games for the Reds in 2025 and hit .255 with five home runs and eight RBI.

==== 2026 ====
Stewart was named to the 2026 Major League Baseball All-Star Game, his first All-Star selection. Against the San Francisco Giants on August 26, Stewart became the third rookie ever to reach 100 RBI before any other MLB player that season. Two days later against the Chicago Cubs, he had his 101st RBI, passing Jim Greengrass (1953) for the most by a Reds rookie. One day later, he became the first Reds rookie to achieve a 30 home run and 100 RBI season. Stewart finished the 2026 season with a .263/.330/.457 slash line, 32 home runs, and 112 RBI across 162 games. After the season, he was named a finalist for National League Rookie of the Year. Stewart was named the winner of the award on November 9, receiving 20 first-place votes.

== Career accomplishments ==
=== Cincinnati Reds franchise records ===
- Most RBI by a rookie (previously held by Jim Greengrass with 100)

== Personal life ==
Stewart is a Christian.

== See also ==
- List of Major League Baseball home run records

Awards
Preceded by Daylen Lile; Esmerlyn Valdez	National League Rookie of the Month; April 2026; August 2026	Succeeded by T. J. Rumfield; Himself
