= Ryan McBroom =

American baseball player (born 1992)

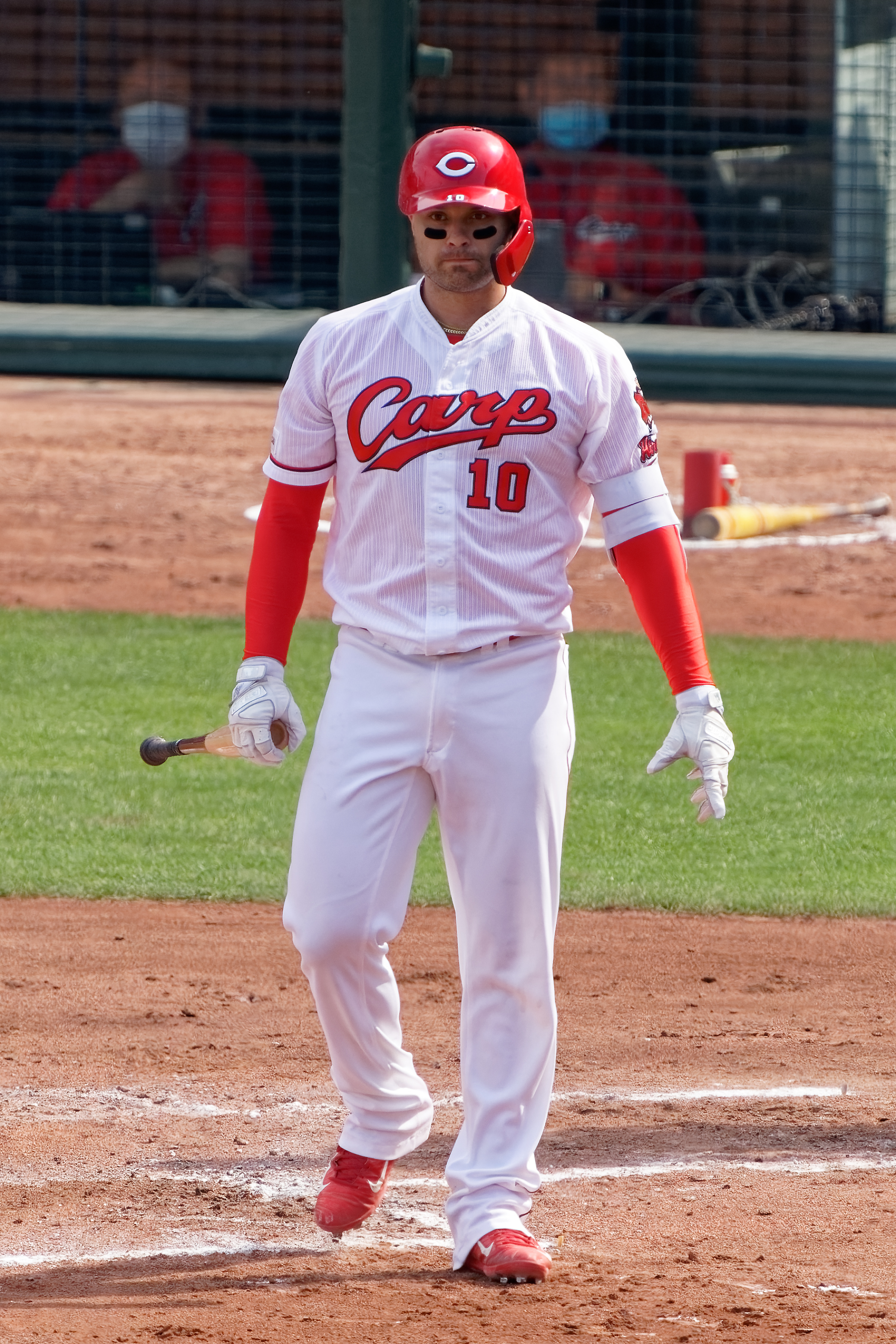
- McBroom with the Hiroshima Toyo Carp in 2022

Free agent
- First baseman / Outfielder
- Born: April 9, 1992 (age 34); Fredericksburg, Virginia, U.S.
- Bats: Right Throws: Left

Professional debut
- MLB: September 3, 2019, for the Kansas City Royals
- NPB: March 29, 2022, for the Hiroshima Toyo Carp
- KBO: April 25, 2025, for the SSG Landers

MLB statistics (through 2021 season)
- Batting average: .268
- Home runs: 6
- Runs batted in: 16

NPB statistics (through 2023 season)
- Batting average: .255
- Home runs: 23
- Runs batted in: 105

KBO statistics (through 2025 season)
- Batting average: .203
- Home runs: 4
- Runs batted in: 11
- Stats at Baseball Reference

Teams
- Kansas City Royals (2019–2021); Hiroshima Toyo Carp (2022–2023); SSG Landers (2025)

Ryan Patrick McBroom (born April 9, 1992) is an American professional baseball first baseman who is a free agent. He has previously played in Major League Baseball (MLB) for the Kansas City Royals, in Nippon Professional Baseball (NPB) for the Hiroshima Toyo Carp, and in the KBO League for the SSG Landers.

== Career ==
=== Amateur career ===
McBroom attended Holy Cross Academy in Fredericksburg, Virginia during his formative years of elementary and middle school. He attended Courtland High School in Spotsylvania County, Virginia, and later West Virginia University.

The Kansas City Royals selected McBroom in the 36th round of the 2013 Major League Baseball draft, but he did not sign and returned to finish college.

=== Toronto Blue Jays ===
The Toronto Blue Jays selected McBroom in the 15th round, with the 444th overall pick, of the 2014 Major League Baseball draft, and was assigned to the Low-A Vancouver Canadians of the Northwest League. In 70 games, McBroom batted .297 with 11 home runs and 59 RBI. His 11 home runs tied for the league lead. McBroom began the 2015 season with the Lansing Lugnuts. On June 5, he was named a Midwest League midseason All-Star. At that time, McBroom was batting .307 with 16 doubles. On August 24, McBroom was named the 2015 Midwest League MVP, becoming the third Blue Jays prospect to win the award after Kevin Pillar and Brian Dopirak. McBroom played in 127 games in 2015 for Lansing, and batted .315 with 12 home runs and 90 RBIs. He was assigned to the High-A Dunedin Blue Jays to open the 2016 season. McBroom played in 119 games for Dunedin in 2016, as well as nine games with the Double-A New Hampshire Fisher Cats. He would bat a combined .266 with 22 home runs and 85 RBIs. After the 2016 season, the Blue Jays assigned McBroom to the Mesa Solar Sox of the Arizona Fall League. He appeared in seven games for the Sox before being removed from the roster due to injury. He began 2017 with New Hampshire Fisher Cats.

=== New York Yankees ===
On July 23, 2017, McBroom was traded to the New York Yankees in exchange for Rob Refsnyder. The Yankees assigned him to the Double-A Trenton Thunder, where he spent the remainder of the season. In 134 total games between the two affiliates, McBroom batted a combined .247 with 16 home runs and 70 RBI. He split the 2018 season between Trenton and the Triple-A Scranton/Wilkes-Barre RailRiders, hitting a combined .302/.348/.458 with 15 home runs and 60 RBI. McBroom returned to Scranton/Wilkes-Barre in 2019.

=== Kansas City Royals ===
On August 31, 2019, McBroom was traded to the Kansas City Royals in exchange for international bonus pool allotments and cash considerations or a player to be named later. On September 3, the Royals selected McBroom's contract and promoted him to the major leagues. He made his debut that night versus the Detroit Tigers, recording his first major league hit off Daniel Norris. McBroom made 23 appearances during his rookie campaign, batting .293/.361/.360 with six RBI.

McBroom hit his first career home run on July 31, 2020. McBroom made 36 appearances for Kansas City during the truncated 2020 campaign, slashing .247/.282/.506 with six home runs and 10 RBI.

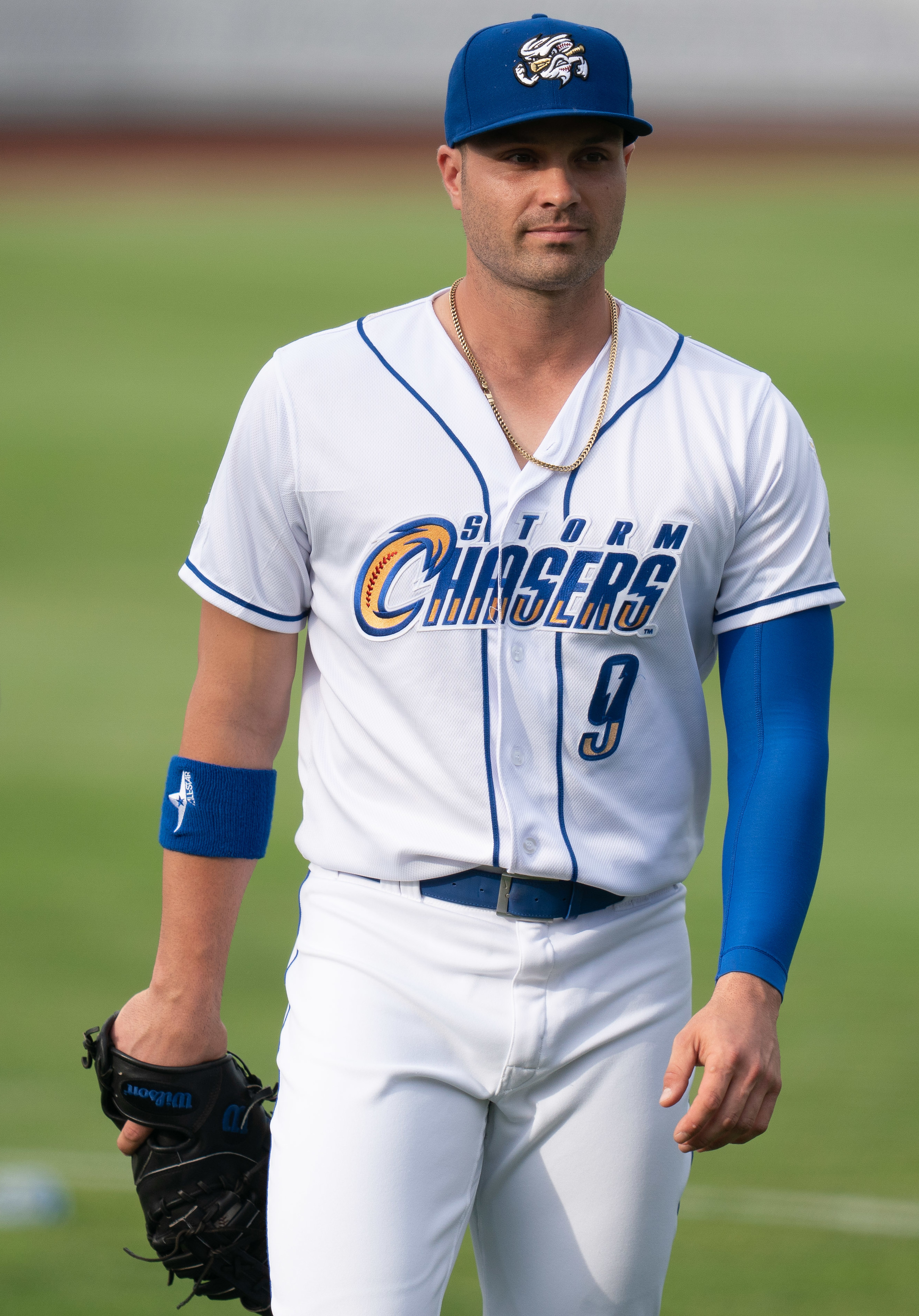
McBroom with the Omaha Storm Chasers in 2021

McBroom spent the 2021 season with the Triple-A Omaha Storm Chasers and the Royals. He only had eight at-bats with Kansas City, recording two hits (.250). McBroom played in 115 games with Triple-A Omaha, hitting .261 with 32 home runs and 88 RBI. On November 1, 2021, McBroom was released by the Royals to pursue an opportunity in Asia.

=== Hiroshima Toyo Carp ===
On November 5, 2021, McBroom signed a $1 million dollar deal with the Hiroshima Toyo Carp of Nippon Professional Baseball. In 128 games for Hiroshima in 2022, he batted .272/.352/.442 with 17 home runs and 74 RBI.

In 2023 McBroom exercised his player option by agreeing to a 1 year $1.8 million dollar deal. McBroom played in 70 contests for the Carp, hitting .221/.305/.354 with 6 home runs and 31 RBI. On November 16, 2023, Hiroshima announced that they would not offer McBroom a contract for the 2024 season, and he became a free agent.

=== Long Island Ducks ===
On May 8, 2024, McBroom signed with the Long Island Ducks of the Atlantic League of Professional Baseball. In 88 games for the Ducks, he slashed .268/.376/.497 with 19 home runs, 68 RBI, and eight stolen bases. McBroom became a free agent following the season.

On April 11, 2025, McBroom re-signed with Long Island.

=== SSG Landers ===
On April 20, 2025, McBroom signed with the SSG Landers of the KBO League as an injury replacement for Guillermo Heredia. He made 22 appearances for the Landers, slashing .203/.263/.405 with four home runs and 11 RBI. On May 23, the Landers parted ways with McBroom following the expiration of his contract.
