= Alfredo Duno =

Venezuelan baseball player (born 2006)

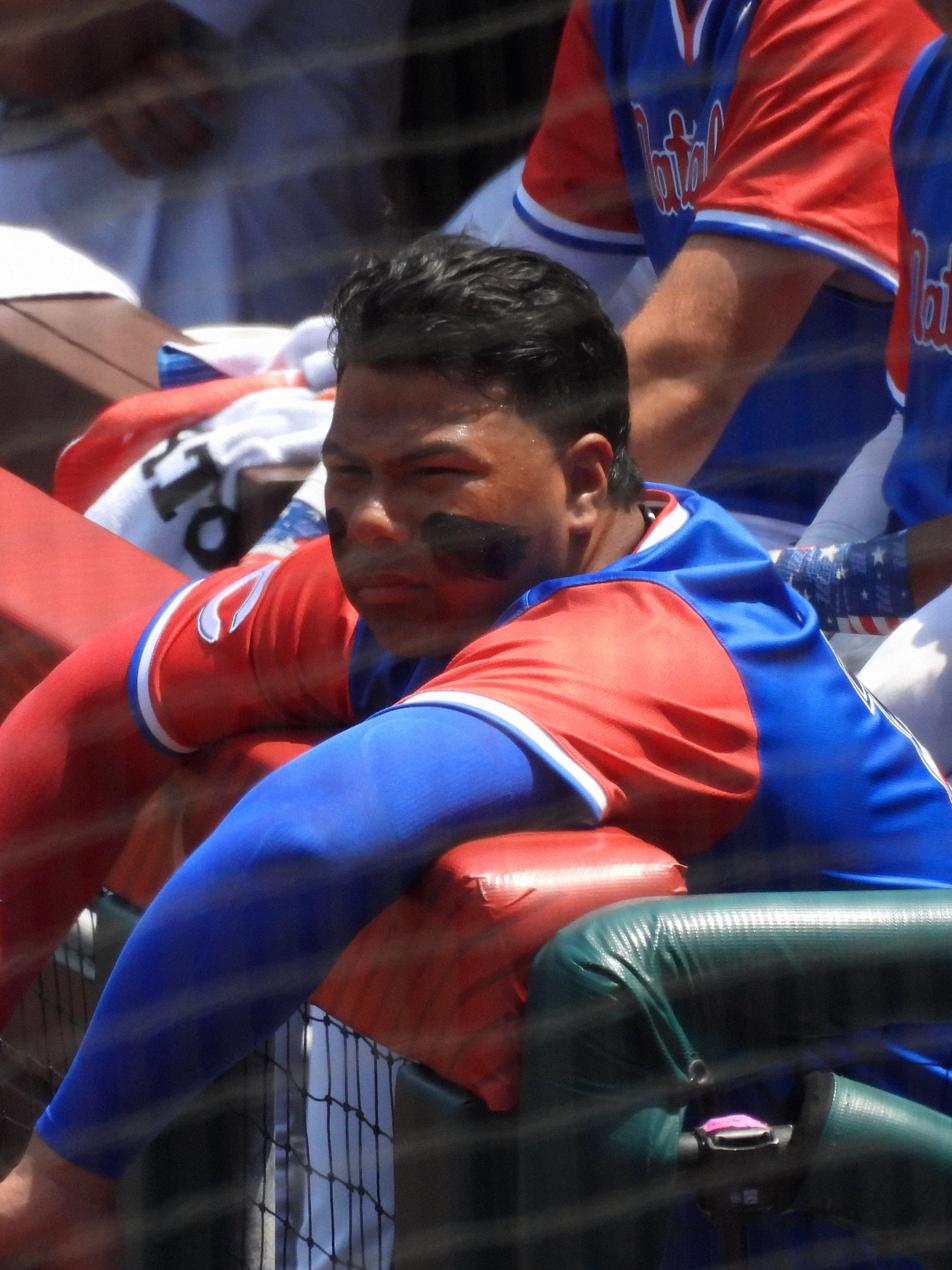
- Duno representing the National League Futures in 2026

Cincinnati Reds
- Catcher
- Born: January 7, 2006 (age 20); Miranda, Venezuela
- Bats: Right Throws: Right
- Stats at Baseball Reference

Alfredo Enrique Duno (born January 7, 2006) is a Venezuelan professional baseball catcher in the Cincinnati Reds organization.

== Professional career ==
Duno signed with the Cincinnati Reds as an international free agent in January 2023. He made his professional debut that year with the Dominican Summer League Reds.

Duno played 2024 with the Daytona Tortugas, although he was limited to only 32 games due to a subluxation in his right ribs. He would spend the entire 2025 season with Daytona. On July 2, 2025, Duno was named to the All-Star Futures Game, alongside third baseman Sal Stewart.

Duno began the 2026 season with the Dayton Dragons. On May 28, Keith Law ranked Duno as the 35th prospect in his in-season rankings update. Law noted that Duno possesses power and an understanding of the strike zone, although he noted his struggles making contact. Duno was selected as the Cincinnati Reds Minor League Player of the Month for May, and at the time was ranked the #1 prospect in the Reds prospect pool by both MLB Pipeline and Baseball America. On July 2, Duno was named to the 2026 All-Star Futures Game, as the only representative of the Reds.

== Personal life ==
Duno was born when his parents were both teenagers, and their family moved to the Dominican Republic when he was 11 years old. Growing up, his favorite player was fellow Venezuelan catcher Salvador Perez.
