= Brian Dopirak =

American baseball player (born 1983)

- First baseman
- Born: December 20, 1983 (age 41); Tampa, Florida, U.S.
- Bats: Right Throws: Right

Brian Allan Dopirak (born December 20, 1983) is an American former professional baseball first baseman. He was drafted by the Chicago Cubs in the second round of the 2002 MLB draft.

== Early life ==
=== High school ===
Dopirak attended Dunedin High School. He was originally selected by Chicago Cubs in the second round (56th overall) of the 2002 Major League Baseball draft.

== Professional career ==
=== Chicago Cubs ===
Dopirak spent 2002, his first professional season, with the rookie-level Arizona League Cubs batting .253 with no home runs and six runs. In 2003, Dopirak played for the Low-A Boise Hawks of the Northwest League, batting .240 while clubbing 13 home runs and 37 runs batted in. He was then promoted to the Single-A Lansing Lugnuts of Midwest League, concluding the 2003 hitting another two more home runs. In 2004, he hit 39 home runs and 120 RBI with Lansing to go along with a .307 batting average.

After the 2004 season, Dopirak experienced injury problems. He spent the 2005 campaign with the High-A Daytona Cubs, batting .235/.290/.382 with 16 home runs and 76 RBI across 131 appearances. On November 18, 2005, the Cubs added Dopirak to their 40-man roster to protect him from the Rule 5 draft. Two left foot surgeries in 2006 resulted in a setback, and Dopirak hit .257 with one home run and 23 RBI in 52 games for the Double-A West Tenn Diamond Jaxx.

On August 6, 2007, Dopirak was designated for assignment following the promotion of Eric Patterson. The transaction culminated in his release following the 2007 season. In 115 appearances split between Daytona and the Double-A Tennessee Smokies, Dopirak slashed a combined .266/.311/.449 with 18 home runs and 68 RBI.

=== Toronto Blue Jays ===
Dopirak signed a minor league contract with the Toronto Blue Jays in March 2008. Dopirak was assigned to the High-A Dunedin Blue Jays, where he slashed .308/.382/.577 with hitting 27 home runs and 88 RBI. He was promoted to the Blue Jays' Double-A affiliate, the New Hampshire Fisher Cats, where he stayed for the remainder of the year. With New Hampshire, Dopirak batted .287/.297/.425 with two home runs and 13 RBI.

Dopirak started the 2009 season with the Fisher Cats and hit .308/.374/.576 to go along with 19 home runs and 68 RBI. He then earned another promotion to the Jays' Triple-A affiliate, the Las Vegas 51s. With Las Vegas, Dopirak hit .330/.366/.509 with eight home runs and 34 RBI.

On November 9, 2009, Dopirak's contract was purchased by Toronto, adding him to their 40-man roster. On June 16, 2010, Dopirak was removed from the 40-man roster and sent outright to Triple-A Las Vegas. In 86 games for he 51s, he batted .274/.309/.454 with 11 home runs and 53 RBI. Dopirak became a free agent on October 5.

=== Houston Astros ===
On November 13, 2010, Dopirak signed a one-year minor league contract with the Houston Astros that included an invitation to spring training. He played in 57 games for the Triple-A Oklahoma City RedHawks, hitting .252/.287/.429 with six home runs and 17 RBI. Dopirak was released by the Astros organization on June 16, 2011.

== Awards ==
- High School All-American 2002 (DH)
- Midwest League Most Valuable Player Award 2004
- Top Prospect 2005 MLB (#21)
- FSL Post-Season All-Star 2008
- FSL Player of the Week 2008
- FSL Mid-Season All-Star 2008
- R. Howard Webster Award 2008 (Dunedin Blue Jays)
- Topps Double-A All-Star 2009
- Eastern League (EAS) Post-Season All-Star 2009
- EAS Mid-Season All-Star 2009
- EAS Player of the Week 2009
- EAS Player of the Week 2009
- R. Howard Webster Award 2009 (New Hampshire Fisher Cats)
