= Steve Gibralter =

American baseball player (born 1972)

- Outfielder
- Born: October 9, 1972; Dallas, Texas, United States
- Batted: Right Threw: Right

MLB debut
- June 1, 1995, for the Cincinnati Reds

Last MLB appearance
- April 4, 1996, for the Cincinnati Reds

MLB statistics
- Batting average: .200
- Home runs: 0
- Runs batted in: 0
- Stats at Baseball Reference

Teams
- Cincinnati Reds (1995–1996)

Stephan Benson Gibralter (born October 9, 1972) is an American former Major League Baseball player. He played parts of two seasons for the Cincinnati Reds. He was drafted by the Cincinnati Reds in the 6th round of the 1990 amateur draft. His Major League debut came on June 1, 1995.

== Career statistics ==
G	AB	R	H	HR	RBI	AVG
6	5	0	1	0	0	.200

Baseball-Reference
