= Rymer Liriano =

Dominican baseball player (born 1991)

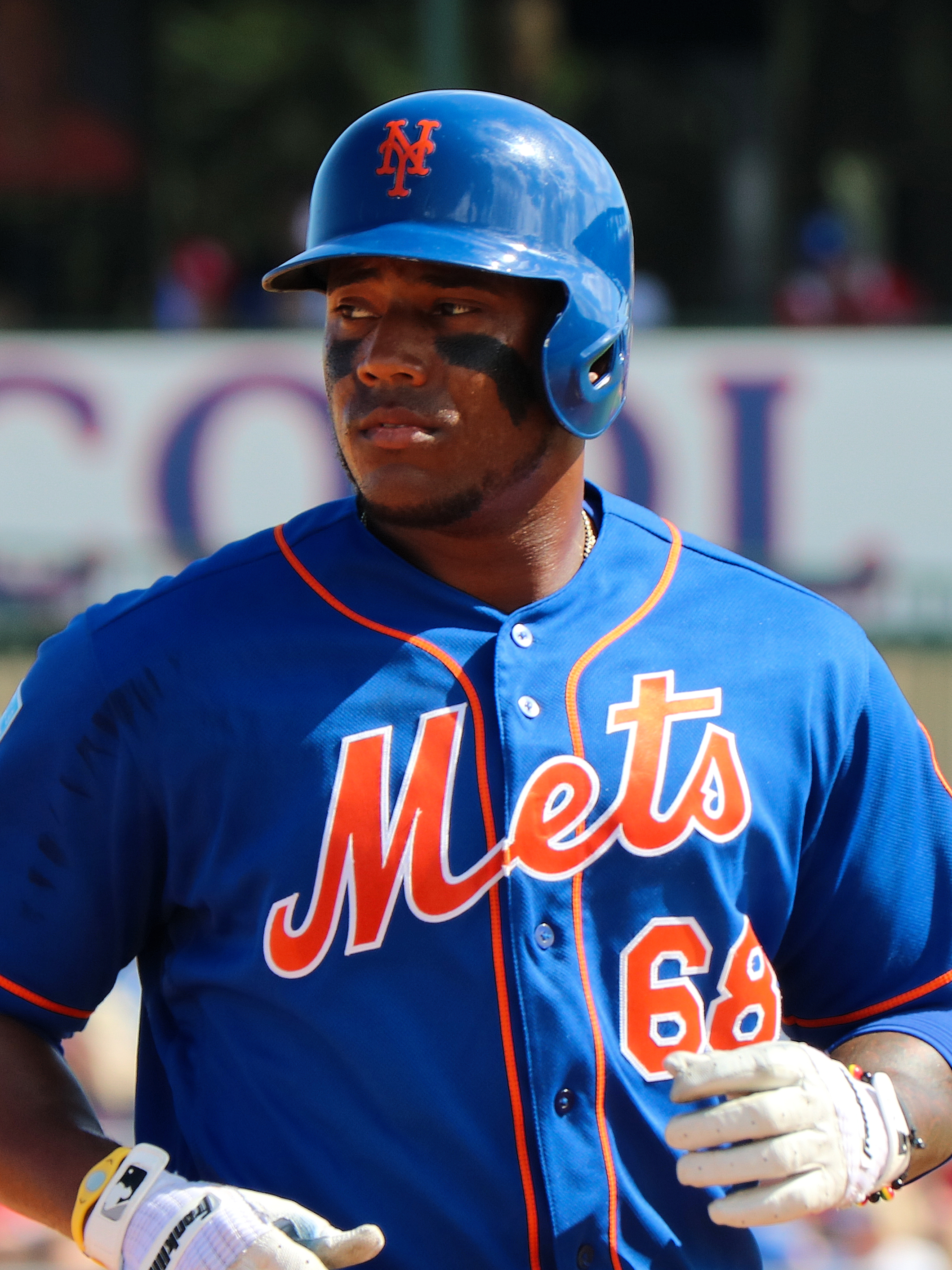
- Liriano with the Mets in 2019
- Outfielder
- Born: June 20, 1991 (age 35); Santo Domingo, Dominican Republic
- Batted: Right Threw: Right

MLB debut
- August 11, 2014, for the San Diego Padres

Last MLB appearance
- October 1, 2017, for the Chicago White Sox

MLB statistics
- Batting average: .220
- Home runs: 2
- Runs batted in: 12
- Stats at Baseball Reference

Teams
- San Diego Padres (2014); Chicago White Sox (2017)

Rymer Omar Liriano (born June 20, 1991) is a Dominican former professional baseball outfielder. He played in Major League Baseball (MLB) for the San Diego Padres and Chicago White Sox.

== Career ==
=== San Diego Padres ===
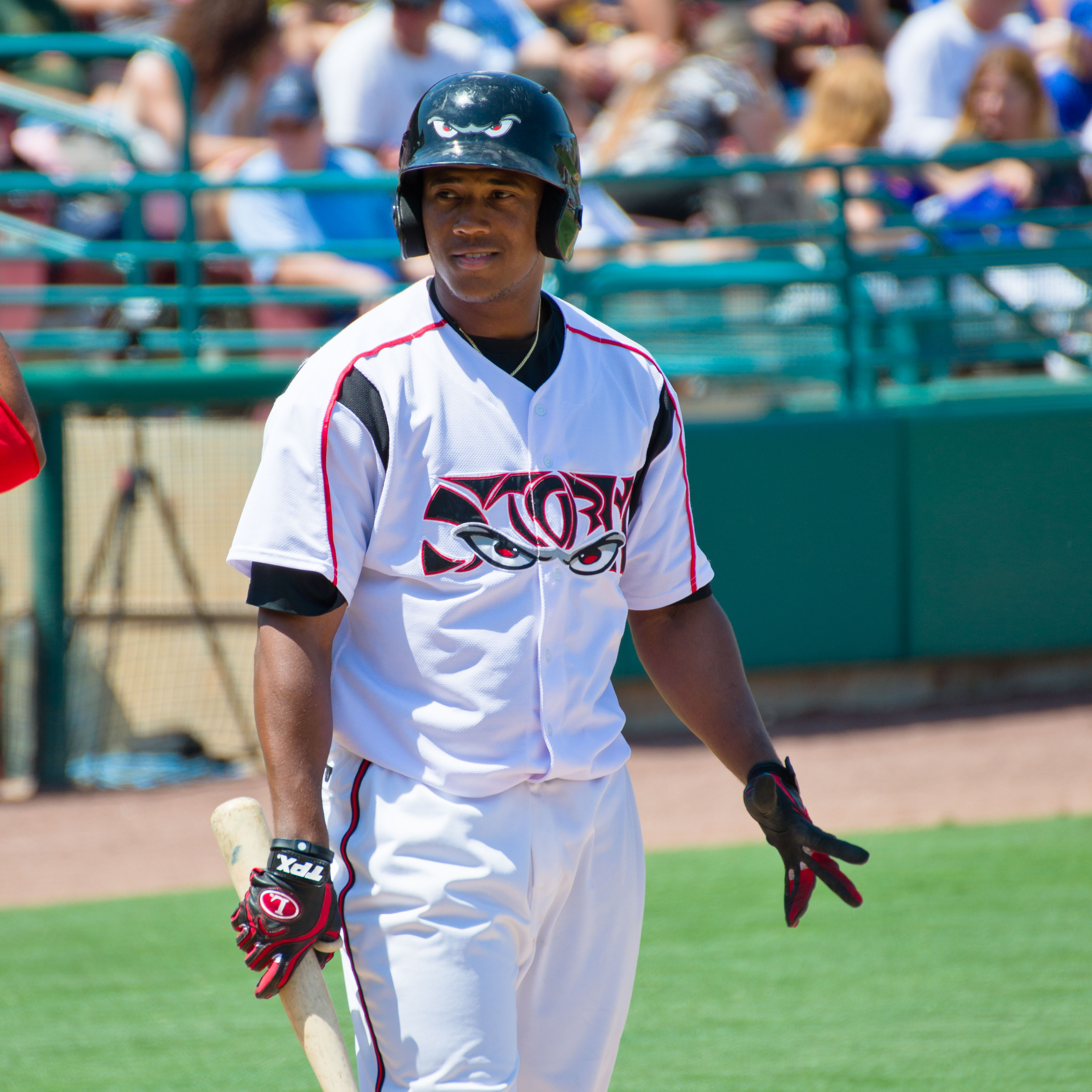
Liriano with the Lake Elsinore Storm

Liriano signed with the San Diego Padres as an international free agent in 2008, and spent the first two seasons on the Padres' rookie-class teams. He then spent the 2010 season primarily with the Eugene Emeralds and the Fort Wayne TinCaps.

Liriano played most of the 2011 season in level-A, batting .319 with 12 home runs and 65 stolen bases and was named Midwest League MVP. Liriano began the 2012 season with the Padres' High-A affiliate Lake Elsinore Storm in the California League and was named a midseason All Star.

On November 18, 2011, the Padres added Liriano to their 40-man roster to protect him from the Rule 5 draft. Liriano was named by Baseball America as the 49th best prospect in baseball heading into the 2012 season. He was named to appear in the 2012 All-Star Futures Game.

Liriano was called up to the majors for the first time on August 11, 2014, and he played in 38 games his rookie season. On August 13, 2014, he hit his first career home run off Tyler Matzek.

Liriano spent the 2015 season with the El Paso Chihuahuas of the Triple–A Pacific Coast League. The Padres designated Liriano for assignment after the 2015 season.

=== Milwaukee Brewers ===
The Padres traded Liriano to the Milwaukee Brewers in exchange for Trevor Seidenberger on January 28, 2016.

=== Chicago White Sox ===
On October 28, 2016, Liriano was claimed off waivers by the Chicago White Sox. On September 4, 2017, Liriano recorded his first White Sox hit, a solo home run off Trevor Bauer of the Cleveland Indians. In 21 appearances for Chicago, he batted .220/.304/.341 with one home run, six RBI, and one stolen base. On October 4, Liriano was removed from the 40-man roster and sent outright to the Triple-A Charlotte Knights.

=== Los Angeles Angels ===
Liriano signed a minor league contract with the Los Angeles Angels on December 12, 2017. In 65 games for the Triple–A Salt Lake Bees, he batted .268/.343/.523 with 16 home runs, 48 RBI, and 6 stolen bases. Liriano was released by the Angels on July 9.

=== Milwaukee Brewers ===
On July 20, 2018, Liriano signed a minor league contract with the Milwaukee Brewers. In 37 games for the Triple–A Colorado Springs Sky Sox, he hit .221/.341/.363 with four home runs, 11 RBI, and five stolen bases. Liriano elected free agency following the season on November 2.

=== New York Mets ===
On January 3, 2019, Liriano signed a minor league contract with the New York Mets that included an invitation to spring training. In 82 games for the Triple–A Syracuse Mets, he batted .209/.346/.403 with 10 home runs, 29 RBI, and seven stolen bases. Liriano elected free agency following the season on November 4.

=== Seattle Mariners ===
On February 23, 2020, Liriano signed a minor league deal with the Seattle Mariners. He did not play in a game in 2020 due to the cancellation of the minor league season because of the COVID-19 pandemic. Liriano was released by the Mariners organization on May 27.

=== West Virginia Power ===
On April 5, 2021, Liriano signed with the West Virginia Power of the Atlantic League of Professional Baseball. In 101 games for the Power, he slashed .297/.415/.466 with nine home runs, 42 RBI, and five stolen bases. Liriano became a free agent following the season.

=== Staten Island FerryHawks ===
On March 24, 2022, Liriano signed with the Staten Island FerryHawks of the Atlantic League of Professional Baseball. In 21 appearances for Staten Island, he batted .157/.302/.229 with one home run and 10 RBI.

=== Fargo-Moorhead RedHawks ===
On May 29, 2022, Liriano was traded to the Fargo-Moorhead RedHawks of the American Association of Professional Baseball in exchange for a player to be named later. In 61 games for the RedHawks, he batted .283/.362/.425 with eight home runs and 36 RBI. Liriano was released by Fargo on September 12.
