= Sports in Indiana =

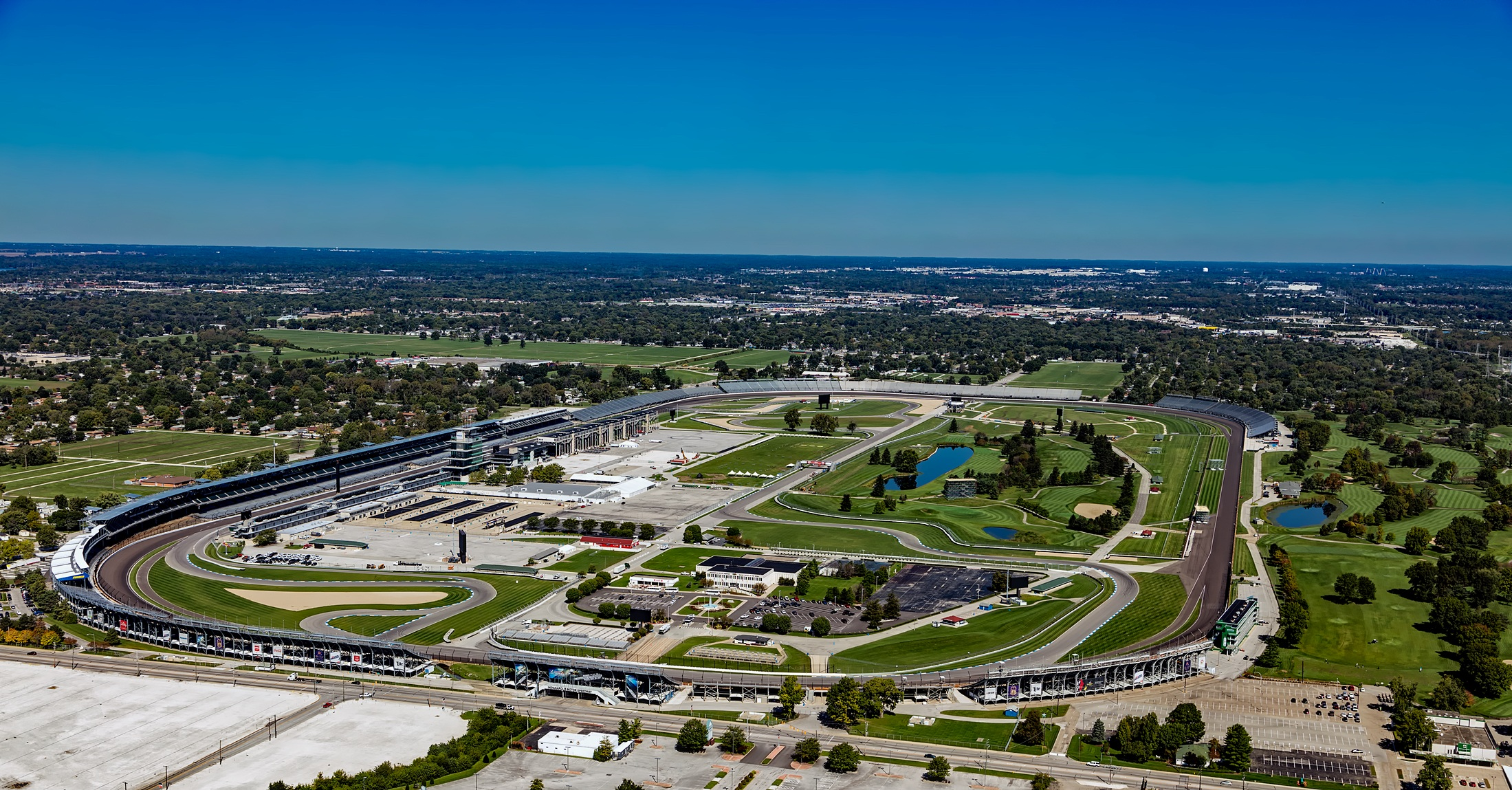
Indianapolis Motor Speedway

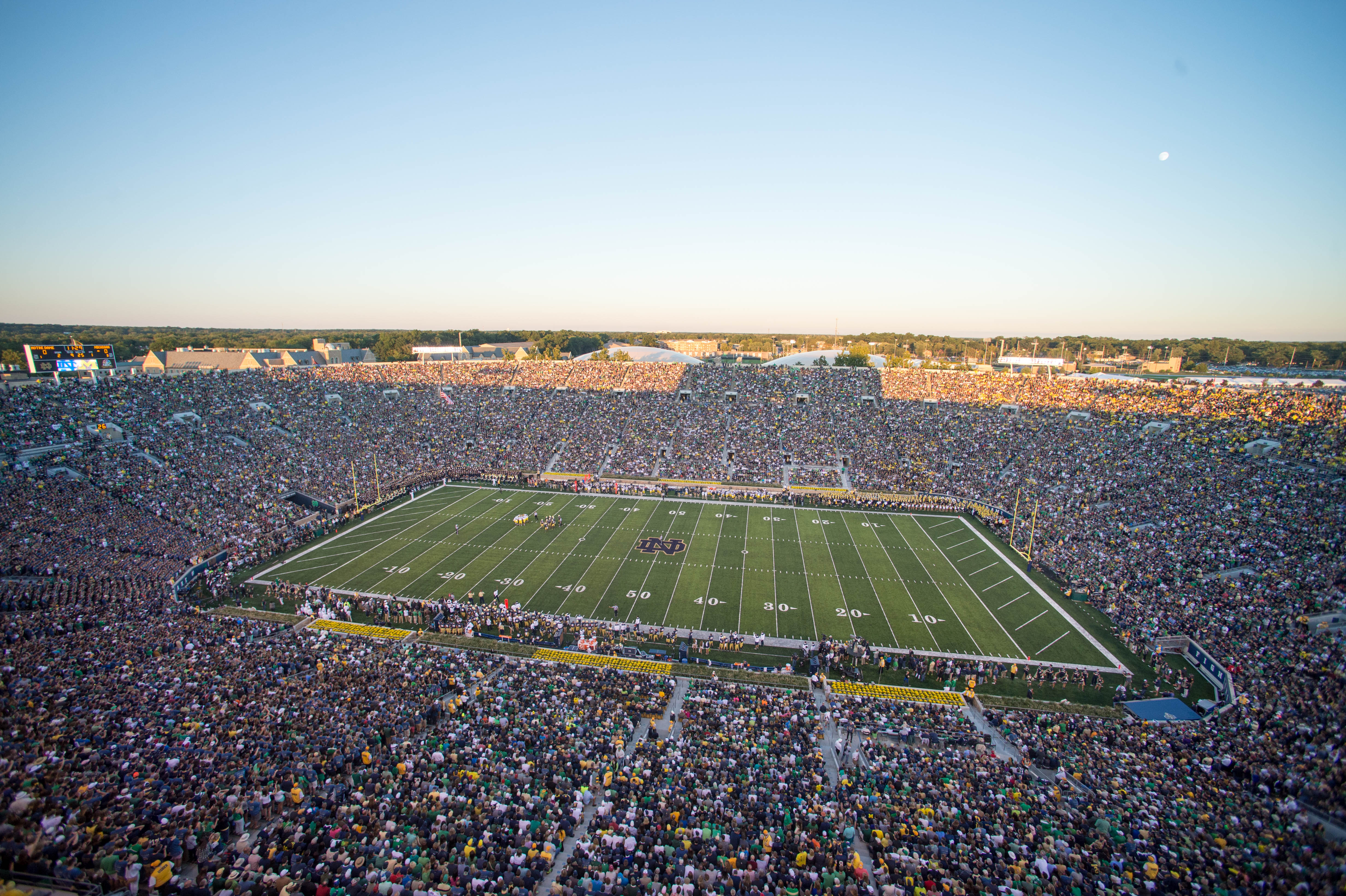
Notre Dame Stadium in South Bend

The state of Indiana is home to two major professional sport franchises, and a number of college sports teams. Indiana is also prominent in auto racing.

== Professional sports teams ==
Indiana has a rich basketball heritage that reaches back to the formative years of the sport itself. Although Canadian educator and inventor James Naismith developed basketball in Springfield, Massachusetts, in 1891, Indiana is where high school basketball was born. In 1925, Naismith visited an Indiana basketball state finals game along with 15,000 screaming fans and later wrote "Basketball really had its origin in Indiana, which remains the center of the sport." The 1986 film Hoosiers is inspired by the story of the 1954 Indiana state champions Milan High School.

As of 2013 Indiana has produced more National Basketball Association (NBA) players per capita than any other state. Muncie has produced the most per capita of any American city, with two other Indiana cities in the top ten. Professional basketball player Larry Bird was born in West Baden Springs and was raised in French Lick. He went on to lead the Boston Celtics to the NBA championship in 1981, 1984, and 1986.

The Indiana Pacers of the NBA play their home games at Gainbridge Fieldhouse; they began play in 1967 in the American Basketball Association (ABA) and joined the NBA when the leagues merged in 1976.

Indianapolis is home to the Indianapolis Colts. The Colts are members of the South Division of the American Football Conference. The Colts have roots back to 1913 as the Dayton Triangles. They became an official team after moving to Baltimore, MD, in 1953. In 1984, the Colts relocated to Indianapolis, leading to an eventual rivalry with the Baltimore Ravens. After calling the RCA Dome home for 25 years, the Colts currently play their home games at Lucas Oil Stadium in Indianapolis. While in Baltimore, the Colts won the 1970 Super Bowl. In Indianapolis, the Colts won Super Bowl XLI, bringing the franchise total to two. In recent years the Colts have regularly competed in the NFL playoffs.

=== List of current major professional teams ===
Club	Sport	Established	League	Venue
Indiana Fever	Basketball	2000	Women's National Basketball Association	Gainbridge Fieldhouse
Indiana Pacers	Basketball	1967	National Basketball Association	Gainbridge Fieldhouse
Indianapolis Colts	Football	1953/1984	National Football League	Lucas Oil Stadium

=== List of other current professional teams ===
Club	Sport	Established	League	Venue
Evansville Otters	Baseball	1995	Frontier League	Bosse Field
Evansville Thunderbolts	Ice hockey	2016	Southern Professional Hockey League	Ford Center
Fishers Freight	Indoor football	2023	Indoor Football League	Fishers Event Center
Fort Wayne FC	Soccer	2019	USL League One	Ruoff Mortgage Stadium
Fort Wayne Komets	Ice hockey	1952	ECHL	Allen County War Memorial Coliseum
Fort Wayne TinCaps	Baseball	1993	Midwest League	Parkview Field
Gary SouthShore RailCats	Baseball	2002	American Association	U.S. Steel Yard
Hamilton County Huskers	Basketball	2026	The Basketball League	SAC Arena
Indiana Sentinels	Ice hockey	2025	Federal Prospects Hockey League	Hamilton Community Center & Ice Arena
Indianapolis AlleyCats	Ultimate	2012	American Ultimate Disc League	Grand Park Events Center
Indianapolis Indians	Baseball	1902	International League	Victory Field
Indy Eleven	Soccer	2014	USL Championship	IU Michael A. Carroll Track & Soccer Stadium
Indy Fuel	Ice hockey	2014	ECHL	Fishers Event Center
Kokomo BobKats	Basketball	2020	The Basketball League	Memorial Gymnasium
Lebanon Leprechauns	Basketball	2021	The Basketball League	Rosenstihl Gymnasium
Noblesville Boom	Basketball	2007	NBA G League	Riverview Health Arena at Innovation Mile
South Bend Cubs	Baseball	1988	Midwest League	Four Winds Field
Indy Ignite	Indoor volleyball	2025	Major League Volleyball	Fishers Event Center

=== List of current amateur teams ===
Club	Sport	Established	League	Venue
1927 SC	Soccer	1927	Midwest Premier League	
Crestwood Panthers	Collegiate summer baseball	2017	Northern League	
Dubois County Bombers	Collegiate summer baseball	1998	Prospect League	League Stadium
Elkhart County Miracle	Collegiate summer baseball	2023	Northern League	
Fort Wayne Spacemen	Junior ice hockey	2012	United States Premier Hockey League	
Griffith Generals	Collegiate summer baseball	2014	Northern League	
Indy Eleven (Women)	Soccer	2021	USL W League	Grand Park
Indianapolis Impalas	Rugby	1980	USA Rugby	Indianapolis World Sports Park
Kokomo Creek Chubs	Collegiate summer baseball	2026	Prospect League	
Lafayette Aviators	Collegiate summer baseball	2015	Prospect League	Loeb Stadium
Lake County Corn Dogs	Collegiate summer baseball	2022	Northern League	
Northwest Indiana Oilmen	Collegiate summer baseball	2012	Northern League	
Richmond Flying Mummies	Collegiate summer baseball	2026	Northwoods League	
Southland Vikings	Collegiate summer baseball	2011	Northern League	
Terre Haute Rex	Collegiate summer baseball	2010	Prospect League	Bob Warn Field

=== List of former major professional teams ===
Club	Sport	Years	League
Anderson Packers / Duffey Packers / Chiefs	Basketball	1946–1951	NBL, NBA, NPBL
Evansville Crimson Giants	Football	1921–1922	NFL
Fort Wayne Kekiongas	Baseball	1866–1871	National Association of Professional Base Ball Players, National Association of Base Ball Players
Fort Wayne Pistons / Zollner Pistons	Basketball	1937–1957	NBL, BAA, NBA
Hammond Pros	Football	1920–1926	National Football League
Indianapolis Blues	Baseball	1878	National League
Indianapolis Hoosiers	Baseball	1884	American Association
Indianapolis Hoosiers	Baseball	1887–1889	National League
Indianapolis Jets/Kautskys/Oilers/Pure Oils	Basketball	1931–1949	NPBL, MBC, NBL, BAA
Indianapolis Olympians	Basketball	1949–1953	NBA
Indianapolis Racers	Ice hockey	1974–1978	World Hockey Association
Muncie/Congerville/Jonesboro Flyers	Football	1905–1926	APFA/NFL, Independent

=== List of other former professional and amateur teams ===
Club	Sport	Years	League
Chi-Town Shooters	Ice hockey	2008–2011	All American Hockey League
Pine Village Villagers	American Football	early 1900's-1910's	Independent
Elkhart Express	Basketball	2006–2009	International Basketball League
Evansville Crush	Indoor Soccer	2010–2013	Premier Arena Soccer League
Evansville IceMen	Ice hockey	2008–2010	All American Hockey League
Evansville IceMen	Ice hockey	2010–2016	ECHL
Evansville Jr. Thunderbolts	Junior ice hockey	2015–2019	North American 3 Hockey League
Evansville Kings	Indoor Soccer	2013–2014	Premier Arena Soccer League
Fort Wayne Fever	Soccer	2003–2009	USL Premier Development League
Fort Wayne General Electrics	Basketball	1936–1948	AAU, MBC, NBL, NIBL
Gary Steelheads	Basketball	2000–2008	International Basketball League
Illiana Blackbirds	Junior ice hockey	2012–2016	MnJHL/USPHL
Indiana Blizzard	Ice hockey	2010–2011	All American Hockey League
Indiana Ice	Junior ice hockey	2004–2014	United States Hockey League
Indiana Invaders	Soccer	1998–2011	USL Premier Development League
Indianapolis Clowns	Baseball	1944–1962	Negro American League, independent barnstorming
Indianapolis Crawfords	Baseball	1940	Negro American League
Indianapolis ABCs	Baseball	1913–1926	Negro National League
Indianapolis ABCs	Baseball	1931–1933	NNL(I), NSL, NNL(II)
Indianapolis ABCs	Baseball	1938	Negro American League
Indianapolis ABCs	Baseball	1939	Negro American League
Indianapolis Athletics	Baseball	1937	Negro American League
Richmond Giants	Baseball	1918–1919	Independent

== College sports ==
Indiana has had great sports success at the collegiate level. NCAA Division I athletic programs in the state are:

Team	City	Type	Conferences
Ball State Cardinals	Muncie	State	Mid-American Conference (FBS)
Butler Bulldogs	Indianapolis	Private / non-sectarian	Big East Conference / Pioneer Football League (FCS)
Evansville Purple Aces	Evansville	Private / Methodist	Missouri Valley Conference (non-football)
Indiana Hoosiers	Bloomington	State	Big Ten Conference (FBS)
Indiana State Sycamores	Terre Haute	State	Missouri Valley Conference / Missouri Valley Football Conference (FCS)
IU Indy Jaguars (Note: Inherited the athletic program of the former Indiana University–Purdue University Indianapolis (IUPUI), which was dissolved in 2024 and replaced by separate institutions affiliated with the Indiana University and Purdue University systems.)	Indianapolis	State	Horizon League (non-football)
Notre Dame Fighting Irish	South Bend	Private / Catholic	Atlantic Coast Conference / FBS independent
Purdue Boilermakers	West Lafayette	State	Big Ten Conference (FBS)
Purdue Fort Wayne Mastodons	Fort Wayne	State	Horizon League (non-football)
Southern Indiana Screaming Eagles	Evansville (Note: Mailing address; the campus is outside the city limits in Perry Township.)	State	Ohio Valley Conference (non-football)
Valparaiso Beacons	Valparaiso	Private / Lutheran	Missouri Valley Conference / Pioneer Football League (FCS)

NCAA Division II athletic programs in the state are:

Team	City	Type	Conferences
Indianapolis Greyhounds	Indianapolis	State	Great Lakes Valley Conference
Purdue Northwest Pride	Hammond	State	Great Lakes Intercollegiate Athletic Conference (non-football)

NCAA Division III athletic programs in the state are:

Team	City	Type	Conferences
Anderson Ravens	Anderson	Private	HCAC
DePauw Tigers	Greencastle	Private	North Coast
Earlham Hustlin' Quakers	Richmond	Private	HCAC
Franklin Grizzlies	Franklin	Private	HCAC
Hanover Panthers	Hanover	Private	HCAC
Manchester Spartans	North Manchester	Private	HCAC
Rose-Hulman Fightin' Engineers	Terre Haute	Private	HCAC
St. Mary's Belles	Notre Dame	Private	Michigan
Trine Thunder	Angola	Private	Michigan
Wabash Little Giants	Crawfordsville	Private	North Coast

NAIA athletic programs in the state are:

Team	City	Type	Conferences
Bethel Pilots	Mishawaka	Private	Crossroads
CCSJ Crimson Wave	Whiting	Private	Chicagoland
Goshen Maple Leafs	Goshen	Private	Crossroads
Grace Lancers	Winona Lake	Private	Crossroads
Holy Cross Saints	Notre Dame	Private	Chicagoland
Huntington Foresters	Huntington	Private	Crossroads
Indiana Tech Warriors	Fort Wayne	Private	Wolverine–Hoosier
Indiana Wesleyan Wildcats	Marion	Private	Crossroads
IU Columbus Crimson Pride (Note: Inherited the athletic program of the former Indiana University–Purdue University Columbus (IUPUC), which had been administered by IUPUI. Upon IUPUI's dissolution, almost all of IUPUC's academic programs fell under the administration of the Indiana University system, and more specifically the new IU Indianapolis.)	Columbus	State	River States
IU East Red Wolves	Richmond	State	River States
IU Kokomo Cougars	Kokomo	State	River States
IU Northwest Redhawks	Gary	State	Chicagoland
IU South Bend Titans	South Bend	State	Chicagoland
IU Southeast Grenadiers	New Albany	State	River States
Marian Knights	Indianapolis	Private	Crossroads
Saint Francis Cougars	Fort Wayne	Private	Crossroads
Saint Mary-of-the-Woods Pomeroys	St. Mary's	Private	River States
Taylor Trojans	Upland	Private	Crossroads

NJCAA athletic programs in the state are:

Team	City	Type	Conferences
Ancilla Chargers	Donaldson	Private	MCCAA
Ivy Tech Titans	Fort Wayne	State	OCCAC
Vincennes Trailblazers	Vincennes	State	MWAC

== Motorsport ==
Indiana has an extensive history with motorsport. Indianapolis hosts the Indianapolis 500 mile race over Memorial Day weekend at the Indianapolis Motor Speedway every May since 1911. The name of the race is usually shortened to "Indy 500" and also goes by the nickname "The Greatest Spectacle in Racing." The race attracts over 350,000 people every year, making it the largest single day sporting event in the world. The track also hosts the Brickyard 400 of the NASCAR Cup Series since 1994. From 2000 to 2007, it hosted the United States Grand Prix (Formula One). From 2008 to 2015, it hosted the Indianapolis motorcycle Grand Prix.

Indiana features the world's largest and most prestigious drag race, the NHRA's U.S. Nationals, held each Labor Day weekend at Lucas Oil Indianapolis Raceway Park in Clermont, Indiana.

The United States Auto Club is headquartered next to the Indianapolis Motor Speedway, and sanctions the Indiana Midget Week in June and the Indiana Sprint Week in July. Notable short ovals in Indiana include Indianapolis Raceway Park (NASCAR Trucks and USAC Silver Crown), Anderson Speedway (Little 500 and ARCA/CRA Redbud 400), Salem Speedway (ARCA, USAC Silver Crown), Terre Haute Action Track (USAC Silver Crown Sumar Classic, Hut Hundred, Hulman Classic), and Winchester Speedway (USAC Silver Crown and ARCA/CRA Winchester 400). The Indiana State Fairgrounds used to host the USAC Silver Crown Hoosier Hundred from 1953 to 2020.

Ironman Raceway hosts annual rounds of the Grand National Cross Country since 1995 and the AMA Motocross Championship since 2014. In addition, the AMA Supercross Championship visited the RCA Dome from 1998 to 2008, and the Lucas Oil Stadium has hosted a round since 2009.

Indiana is also host to a major unlimited hydroplane racing power boat race circuits in the major H1 Unlimited league, the Madison Regatta (Madison).

=== Major annual events ===
Sport	Event	League	Facility	Location	Year established
Auto racing	Indianapolis 500	IndyCar Series	Indianapolis Motor Speedway	Speedway	1911
Auto racing	GMR Grand Prix	IndyCar Series	Indianapolis Motor Speedway	Speedway	2014
Auto racing	Gallagher Grand Prix	IndyCar Series	Indianapolis Motor Speedway	Speedway	2020
Auto racing	Verizon 200 at the Brickyard	NASCAR Cup Series	Indianapolis Motor Speedway	Speedway	2021
Auto racing	Pennzoil 150	NASCAR O'Reilly Auto Parts Series	Indianapolis Motor Speedway	Speedway	2012
Auto racing	Battle on the Bricks	IMSA SportsCar Championship	Indianapolis Motor Speedway	Speedway	2014/2023
Auto racing	Dodge//SRT NHRA U.S. Nationals	NHRA Camping World Drag Racing Series	Lucas Oil Indianapolis Raceway Park	Brownsburg	1961
Auto racing	TSport 200	NASCAR Craftsman Truck Series	Lucas Oil Indianapolis Raceway Park	Brownsburg	1995/2022
Auto racing	Reese's 200	ARCA Menards Series	Lucas Oil Indianapolis Raceway Park	Brownsburg	1983/2022
Auto racing	Hoosier Hundred	USAC Silver Crown Series	Lucas Oil Indianapolis Raceway Park	Brownsburg	1946/2023

== Horse racing ==
Pari-mutuel betting was legalized in 1989. Hoosier Park opened in Anderson in 1994, and off-track betting parlors opened in the state in 1995. Indiana Downs opened in Shelbyville in 2002. Hoosier Park became a racino on 2008 and Indiana Downs did the same in 2009.

== Sports venues ==
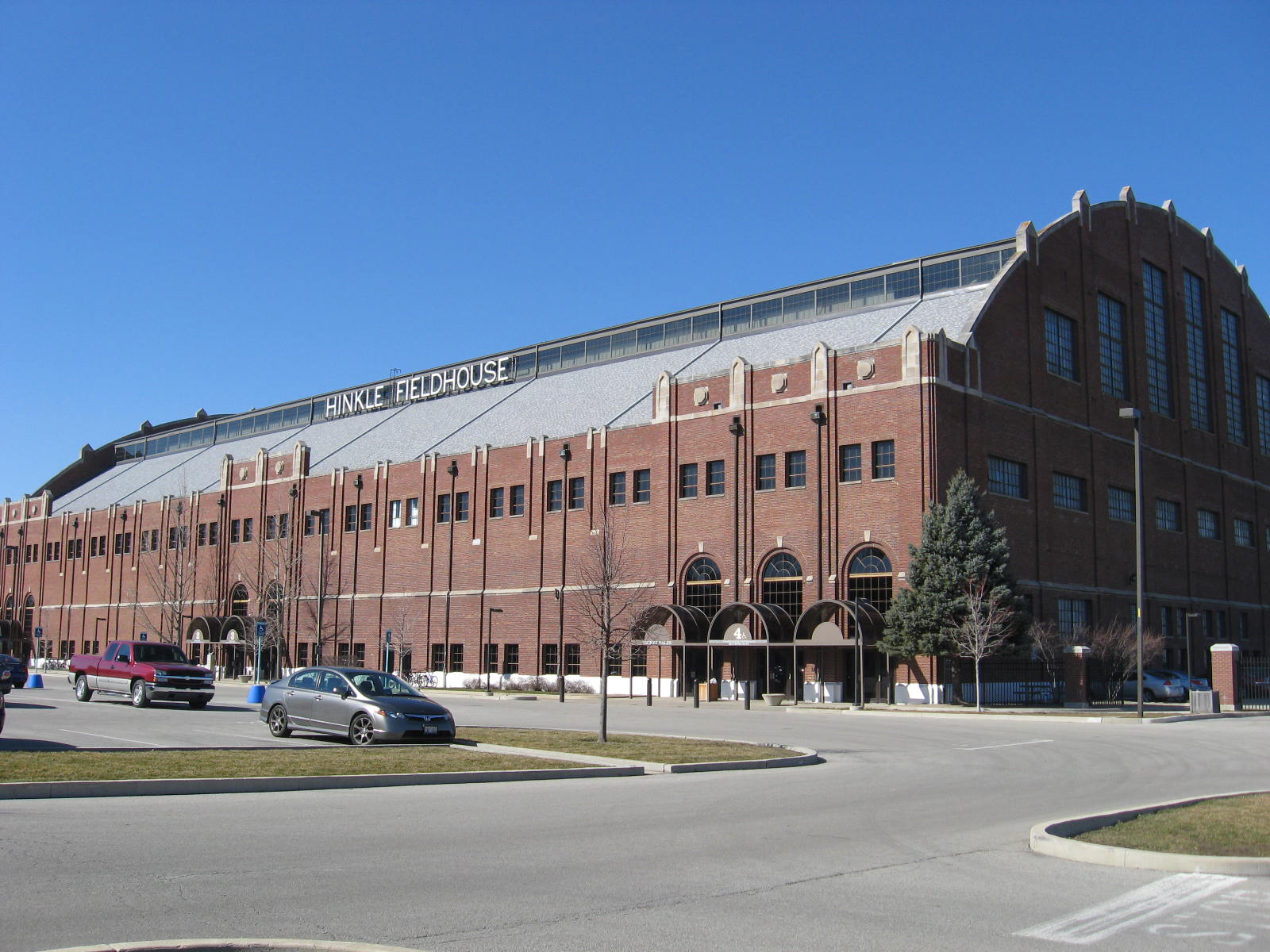
National Historic Landmark Hinkle Fieldhouse, located on the campus of Butler University.

Facility	Seating Capacity	City
Indianapolis Motor Speedway	257,325	Speedway
Notre Dame Stadium	80,795	Notre Dame
Ross–Ade Stadium	65,000	West Lafayette
Lucas Oil Stadium	63,000	Indianapolis
Memorial Stadium	52,929	Bloomington
Lucas Oil Indianapolis Raceway Park	30,000	Brownsburg
Scheumann Stadium	25,400	Muncie
Gainbridge Fieldhouse	18,165	Indianapolis
Simon Skjodt Assembly Hall	17,456	Bloomington
Mackey Arena	14,240	West Lafayette
Allen County War Memorial Coliseum	13,000	Fort Wayne
Memorial Stadium	12,764	Terre Haute
Victory Field	12,496	Indianapolis
Michael Carroll Stadium	12,111	Indianapolis
John E. Worthen Arena	11,500	Muncie
Hulman Center	10,200	Terre Haute
Ford Center	10,000	Evansville
Edmund P. Joyce Center	9,800	South Bend
New Castle High School Field House	9,325	New Castle
Hinkle Fieldhouse	9,100	Indianapolis
Anderson Wigwam	8,996	Anderson
Parkview Field	8,100	Fort Wayne
Muncie Fieldhouse	7,635	Muncie
Bud and Jackie Sellick Bowl	7,500	Indianapolis
Corteva Coliseum	6,300	Indianapolis
U.S. Steel Yard	6,000	Gary
Indiana State College Arena	5,500	Terre Haute
Bosse Field	5,181	Evansville
Compton Family Ice Arena	5,022	South Bend
Stanley Coveleski Regional Stadium	5,000	South Bend

== List of Professional Championships ==
Team	League	Total	Season
Indianapolis Indians	American Association	13	1902, 1908, 1917, 1928, 1949, 1956, 1963, 1982, 1986, 1987, 1988, 1989, 1994
Indianapolis Indians	AAA	7	1917, 1928, 1949, 1956, 1988, 1989, 2000
Gary SouthShore RailCats	American Association of Professional Baseball	3	2005, 2007, 2013
Indiana Fever	WNBA	1	2012
Indiana Mad Ants	G League	1	2013–14
Indiana Pacers	ABA	3	1969–70, 1971–72, 1972–73
Indianapolis Colts	NFL	1	2006
Indy Eleven	USL W League	1	2023
Evansville Otters	Frontier League	2	2006, 2016
