= List of baseball parks in Rockford, Illinois =

List of baseball venues in Rockford, Illinois

This is a list of ballparks in Rockford and nearby Loves Park that have hosted professional, independent, or collegiate summer baseball teams. The list is compiled from the historical sources listed below.

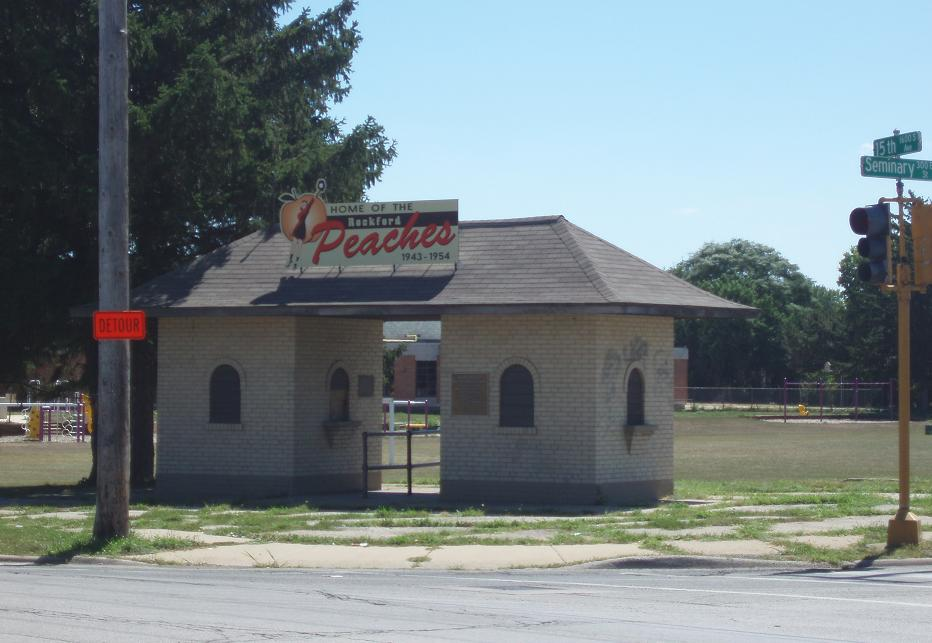
Ticket booth at Beyer Stadium

The Commons
Occupant: Forest Citys – independent (1865)
Location: North Whitman Street (southwest); Church Street (southeast)
Currently: Residential
Sources: Filichia, Benson

ballpark unknown
Occupants: Rockford – 2 clubs – Northwestern League 1869–1870
Source: Filichia

Agricultural Society Fair Grounds later renamed Fairgrounds Park
Occupants:

Forest City – independent (1866–1870), NA (1871 only)
Rockford White Stockings – Northwestern League 1879 only

Location:

Original boundaries: Oak (now Acorn) Street (north); Pecatonica Street and Cherry Street (northeast); buildings and Horsman Street (east); Mulberry Street (south); Kent Creek and St. Paul Railroad (later Milwaukee Road) tracks (west)
Current boundaries: Harkins Aquatic Center and Acorn Street (north); Kilburn Avenue, buildings and Horsman Street (east); West Jefferson Street a.k.a. Business US-20 (south); and Mulberry Street, Kent Creek and railroad tracks (west) – address 900 West Jefferson Street

Sources: Filichia, Benson, Lowry, contemporary maps, Google Maps

North Church Street Grounds
Occupant: Rockford – Central Inter-State League (1888 only)
Location: somewhere on North Church Street (potentially same area as The Commons)
Source: Filichia, local newspapers

West End Park
Occupant: Rockford Hustlers – Illinois–Iowa League (1891–1892)
Location: uncertain
Source: Filichia, local newspapers

Riverside Park
Occupants:

Rockford Reds (a.k.a. Nicol Platers – manager Hugh Nicol) / Forest City / Rough Riders – Western Association (1895–1899)
Rockford Red Sox – Three-I League (1901–1904)
Rockford Reds / Hottentots / Indignants / Wolverines – Wisconsin-Illinois League (1908–1912)

Original location listed as north of Auburn Street (city limits) at B Avenue and Melrose Street
Final location listed as Fulton Avenue (north); Oxford Street (east); Van Wie Avenue (south); Cumberland Street (west)
Sources: Filichia, local newspapers, city directories

Kishwaukee Park a.k.a. Rockford Base Ball Park – sold to Rockford High School in December 1923
Occupants:

Rockford Indignants (a.k.a. Drys) / Wolves – Wisconsin-Illinois League (1913)
Rockford Wakes (a.k.a. Rox 1917) – Three-I League (1915 - mid-1917) (league disbanded)
Rockford Rox (a.k.a. Bells / Rocks) – Three-I League (1919–1923)

Location: 311-335 15th Avenue; just east of Seminary Street
Sources: Filichia, local newspapers, city directories

Rockford Municipal Stadium a.k.a. 15th Avenue Stadium - renamed Beyer Stadium, 1948
Occupants:

Rockford Peaches – All-American Girls Professional Baseball League (1943–1954)
Rockford High School baseball, football, track and field

Location: same as Kishwaukee Park - 311 15th Avenue (north, left field); Seminary Street (west, third base); entrance booth at 15th and Seminary
Sources: Filichia, local newspapers, city directories

Rox Park or 15th Avenue Park
Occupant: Rockford Rox (a.k.a. Rocks) – Central Association (1947–1949)
Location: adjacent to Beyer Stadium, just to the east
Currently: Beyer Early Childhood Center and parking lots
Source: local newspapers

Marinelli Field
Occupants:

Rockford Expos / Royals / Cubbies / Reds – Midwest League (1988–1999)
Rockford RiverHawks – Frontier League (2002–2005)

Location: at the north end of Blackhawk Park – 15th Avenue (north, right field); Nelson Boulevard and Rock River (west, left field) – about 4 blocks west of Beyer Stadium – address is 101 15th Avenue
Sources: Filichia, Benson, Google Maps

Aviators Stadium now known as Rivets Stadium; orig. RiverHawks Stadium, then Road Ranger Stadium
Occupants:

Rockford RiverHawks – Frontier League (2006–2009)
Rockford RiverHawks Northern League (2010 only)
Rockford RiverHawks / Aviators – Frontier League (2011–2015)
Rockford Rivets – Northwoods League (2016–present)

Location: Loves Park, Illinois – 4503 Interstate Boulevard (west, third base); Orth Road (north, left field); Paladin Parkway (east, right field); Commerce Drive (south, first base)

== See also ==
- Lists of baseball parks
