= North West League =

The North West League can refer to:

- North West Football League, Australian rules football league in Tasmania
- North West Hockey League, ice hockey minor league in the United States and Canada
- North West Junior Hockey League, junior ice hockey league in Canada
- Northwest League, Minor League Baseball League in the United States and Canada
- North West Men's League, rugby league competition in England
- North West Merit League, rugby league competition in England
- North West Senior League, cricket league in Ireland
- North West Women's League, association football league in England
- Pacific Northwest League, early baseball league in the United States

== See also ==
- Northwestern League (19th-century), an early central U.S. baseball league
- Northwestern League (1905–1917), a baseball league in the U.S. Pacific Northwest, and B.C. in Canada
- Northern League (disambiguation)
- Western League (disambiguation)
