= Beloit Sky Carp =

American Minor League baseball team

- Founded in 1982; Beloit, Wisconsin
Team logo
Cap insignia

Minor league affiliations
- Class: High-A (2021–present)
- Previous classes: Class A (1982–2020)
- League: Midwest League (1982–present)
- Division: West Division

Major league affiliations
- Team: Miami Marlins (2021–present)
- Previous teams: Oakland Athletics (2013–2020); Minnesota Twins (2005–2012); Milwaukee Brewers (1982–2004)

Minor league titles
- League titles (1): 1995
- Division titles (8): 1984; 1985; 1987; 1992; 1995; 2000; 2003; 2007
- First-half titles (4): 1995; 2000; 2007; 2013
- Second-half titles (4): 1992; 1995; 2003; 2025
- Wild card berths (1): 2018

Team data
- Name: Beloit Sky Carp (2022–present)
- Previous names: Beloit Snappers (1995–2021); Beloit Brewers (1982–1994)
- Colors: Blue, orange, black, gray, white
- Mascot: Poopsie
- Ballpark: ABC Supply Stadium (2021–present)
- Previous parks: Harry C. Pohlman Field (1982–2021)
- Owner/ Operator: Quint Studer
- President: Zach Brockman
- Manager: Angel Espada
- Website: milb.com/beloit

The Beloit Sky Carp are a Minor League Baseball team of the Midwest League and the High-A affiliate of the Miami Marlins. They are located in Beloit, Wisconsin, and play their home games at ABC Supply Stadium. They previously played at Harry C. Pohlman Field from its opening in 1982 until moving into their current ballpark in August 2021.

Originally known as the Beloit Brewers from 1982 to 1994 and the Beloit Snappers from 1995 to 2021, the team played in the Class A Midwest League from 1982 to 2020. In conjunction with Major League Baseball's reorganization of Minor League Baseball in 2021, Beloit was shifted to the High-A Central, though this was renamed the Midwest League in 2022. The team rebranded as the Sky Carp prior to the 2022 season.

== History ==
The Beloit Brewers joined the Midwest League as an expansion franchise in 1982. The club was a Milwaukee Brewers farm team from its inception through 2004. Beloit switched to the Minnesota Twins' farm system for the 2005 season. The organization adopted the Snappers nickname in 1995 after using its parent team's nickname for its first 13 seasons. The Snappers' name was inspired by the history of the Beloit area, which includes Turtle Creek, a local town named Turtle, and turtle-shaped burial mounds near Beloit College.

After the Brewers and Snappers ended their affiliation, efforts were started to build a new stadium similar to the facilities used by the Rockford RiverHawks or the Wisconsin Timber Rattlers. One possible scenario involved construction on a site near Janesville, which could have included renaming the team to reflect a broader Rock County audience. However, no new stadium was built and improvements, including redoing the entire field and repairing the concrete concourse, were made to the existing site. After the 2012 season, the city of Beloit appropriated $100,000 in order to completely redo the outfield. The outfield was raised and leveled with the infield and a new sprinkler system was installed.

In September 2018, the team entered into the process of being sold to a new group of investors who planned to build a new ballpark in downtown Beloit. The sale was cancelled in May 2020 amid uncertainty surrounding the Professional Baseball Agreement between Minor and Major League Baseball set to expire after the 2020 season. The group, led by Quint Studer, retained the right to operate the Snappers in 2020 and continued to move forward with plans to build a new stadium. On June 15, 2020, construction began on the new ABC Supply Stadium. The Snappers started the 2021 season at Pohlman Field, and played their first game at ABC Supply Stadium on August 3.

Prior to the 2021 season, the Snappers were organized into the High-A Central. Plans to rebrand the team for the 2021 season, with a new name selected through a "name the team contest" and a new mascot, were postponed until 2022. In November 2021, the team rebranded as the Beloit Sky Carp, taking their new moniker from a nickname for geese. In July 2022, the Sky Carp welcomed their new mascot Poopsie, who was named after a term of endearment used toward a child or significant other. In 2022, the High-A Central became known as the Midwest League, the name historically used by the regional circuit prior to the 2021 reorganization.

=== Former players ===
The 2003 team included two sons of former major league players. Prince Fielder, the son of former American League home run champion Cecil Fielder and Tony Gwynn Jr., son of Tony Gwynn. Future major leaguer Danny Valencia played for the 2007 team. Another noted major leaguer, Jim Morris of The Rookie fame played for the Beloit Brewers when he came out of college in the 1980s. Other former Snappers players who moved on to major league ball include Greg Vaughn, Geoff Jenkins, Jeff D'Amico, Ron Belliard, and Yovani Gallardo. Minnesota Twins players that have come through include Matt Garza and Kevin Slowey.

== Roster ==
Beloit Sky Carp roster
Players		Coaches/Other
Pitchers: 19 Hayden Cuthbertson; 39 Luis De La Cruz; 35 Jaydenn Estanista; 11 Peyton Fosher; 10 Carson Laws; 28 Liomar Martinez; 23 Julio Mendez; 19 Brayan Mendoza; 29 Noble Meyer; 31 Nate Payne; 27 Engel Peralta; 37 Michael Perez; 26 Cannon Pickell; 29 Jesus Rios; 35 Braulio Salas	Catchers: 24 Victor Ortega; 18 Wilson Weber; Infielders: 17 Emilio Barreras; 6 Starlyn Caba; 12 Cam Clayton; 14 Jesus Hernandez; 5 Chase Jaworsky; 22 Carter Johnson; 34 Abrahan Ramirez; 8 Cody Schrier; Outfielders: 3 Dillon Head; 33 Jacob Jenkins-Cowart; 20 Brian Sanchez; 5 Esmil Valencia	Manager: 1 Angel Espada; Coaches: -- Bobby Dorta (assistant); 41 Jason Erickson (pitching); 43 Josh Glenn (defensive); -- Michael Ryan (hitting); 60-day injured list: 22 Cade Austin; 27 Nick Brink (full season); 39 Xavier Cardenas III; 22 Drew Faurot (full season); 7 Wilfredo Lara; 9 Luke Lashutka (full season); -- Nick Maldonado (full season); 36 Chase Renner; 7-day injured list; * On Miami Marlins 40-man roster; ~ Development list; # Rehab assignment; ∞ Reserve list; ‡ Restricted list; § Suspended list; † Temporarily inactive list; Roster updated September 21, 2026; Transactions; → More rosters: MiLB • Midwest League; → Miami Marlins minor league players

== Season-by-season record ==
Season-by-season record
Year	Regular season					Postseason		
Year	Record	Win %	League	Division	GB	Record	Win %	Result
1982	71–68	.511	6th	2nd	13.5	—	—	—
1983	66–71	.482	9th	3rd	8.5	—	—	—
1984	86–53	.619	2nd	1st	—	0–2	.000	Lost semifinals vs. Springfield Cardinals, 2–0
1985	79–57	.581	2nd	1st	—	1–2	.333	Lost semifinals vs. Peoria Chiefs, 2–1
1986	70–69	.504	6th	2nd	7.5	—	—	—
1987	76–64	.543	3rd	1st	—	1–2	.333	Lost semifinals vs. Kenosha Twins, 2–1
1988	66–74	.471	8th	3rd	18	—	—	—
1989	62–72	.463	10th	6th	24	—	—	—
1990	72–63	.533	7th	3rd	5.5	—	—	—
1991	70–67	.511	6th	3rd	6.5	—	—	—
1992	77–58	.570	4th	1st	—	4–4	.500	Won semifinals vs. Appleton Foxes, 2–1; Lost MWL Championship vs. Cedar Rapids Reds, 3–2
1993	60–74	.448	10th	7th	19	—	—	—
1994	76–64	.543	3rd	2nd	13.5	—	—	—
1995	88–51	.633	1st	1st	—	7–1	.875	Won quarterfinals vs. Rockford Cubbies, 2–0; Won semifinals vs. Quad Cities River Bandits, 2–1; Won MWL Championship vs. Michigan Battle Cats, 3–0
1996	88–51	.633	1st	1st	—	1–2	.333	Lost quarterfinals vs. Rockford Cubbies, 2–1
1997	60–73	.451	11th	5th	13	—	—	—
1998	64–75	.460	12th	5th	9	—	—	—
1999	59–80	.424	14th	5th	20	—	—	—
2000	71–64	.526	t-5th	3rd	5.5	4–5	.444	Won quarterfinals vs. Clinton LumberKings, 2–1; Won semifinals vs. Wisconsin Timber Rattlers, 2–1; Lost MWL Championship vs. Michigan Battle Cats, 3–0
2001	67–71	.486	7th	4th	21	0–2	.000	Lost quarterfinals vs. Kane County Cougars, 2–0
2002	57–82	.410	12th	7th	28.5	—	—	—
2003	71–65	.551	2nd	2nd	3.5	4–4	.500	Won quarterfinals vs. Wisconsin Timber Rattlers, 2–0; Won semifinals vs. Clinton LumberKings, 2–1; Lost MWL Championship vs. Lansing Lugnuts, 3–0
2004	72–68	.514	t-7th	5th	11.5	—	—	—
2005	69–71	.493	8th	4th	7.5	1–2	.333	Lost quarterfinals vs. Wisconsin Timber Rattlers, 2–1
2006	74–64	.536	6th	4th	4.5	2–3	.400	Won quarterfinals vs. Peoria Chiefs, 2–1; Lost semifinals vs. Kane County Cougars, 2–0
2007	79–61	.564	2nd	1st	—	6–3	.667	Won quarterfinals vs. Quad Cities River Bandits, 2–0; Won semifinals vs. Clinton LumberKings, 2–0; Lost MWL Championship vs. West Michigan Whitecaps, 3–2
2008	71–67	.514	8th	5th	7.5	—	—	—
2009	57–83	.407	13th	14th	25.0	—	—	—
2010	71–65	.522	7th	4th	11.0	—	—	—
2011	69–69	.500	8th	3rd	12.5	—	—	—
2012	77–63	.550	4th	2nd	1.5	1–2	.333	Lost quarterfinals vs. Clinton LumberKings, 2–1
2013	77–62	.554	5th	3rd	11.5	2–2	.500	Won quarterfinals vs. Clinton LumberKings, 2–0; Lost semifinals vs. Quad Cities River Bandits, 2–0
2014	55–84	.396	16th	8th	35.5	—	—	—
2015	55–84	.396	14th	6th	33.5	—	—	—
2016	65–77	.458	15th	8th	26.5	—	—	—
2017	65–73	.471	11th	5th	14.0	—	—	—
2018	69–69	.500	—	5th	11.0	—	—	—
2019	54–84	.391	—	7th	26.5	—	—	—
2021	55–65	.458	—	4th	14.0	—	—	—
2022	62-67	.481	—	4th	8.0	—	—	—
2023	56–75	.427	—	5th	25.5	—	—	—
2024	60-69	.465	—	4th	16.0	—	—	—
2025	68-63	.519	—	3rd	5.5	1-2	.333	Lost MWL Western Division Finals vs Cedar Rapids Kernels, 2-1
2026	66-65	.504	—	4th	12.5	—	—	—
Totals	2,696–2,664	.503	—	—	—	35–38	.479	1 MWL Championship

== Notable alumni ==
Baseball Hall of Fame alumni

- Paul Molitor (1990) Inducted, 2004

=== Non-HOF and current players ===
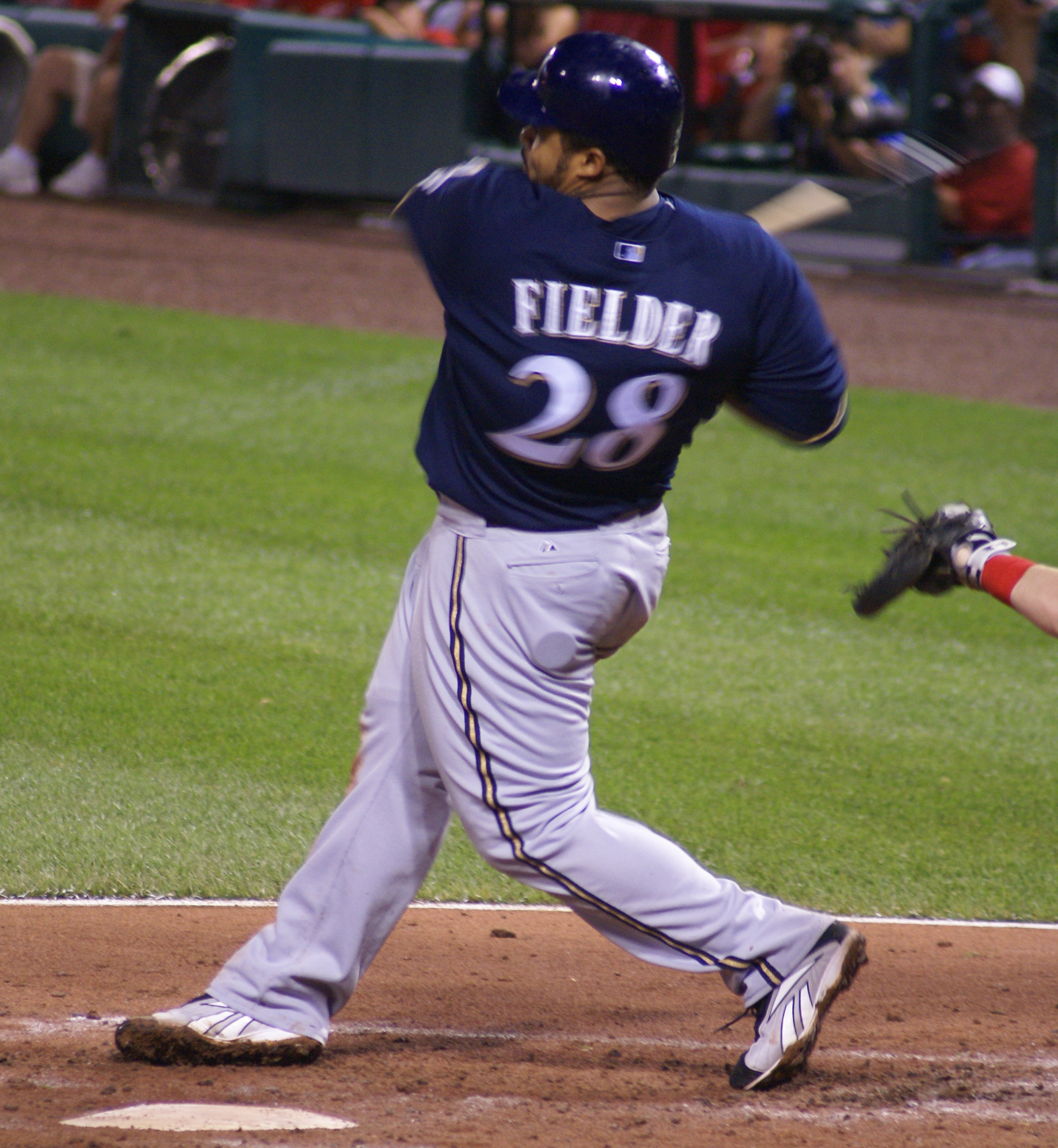
Prince Fielder (2002–03) was selected as the Midwest League's MVP and Prospect of the Year in 2003.

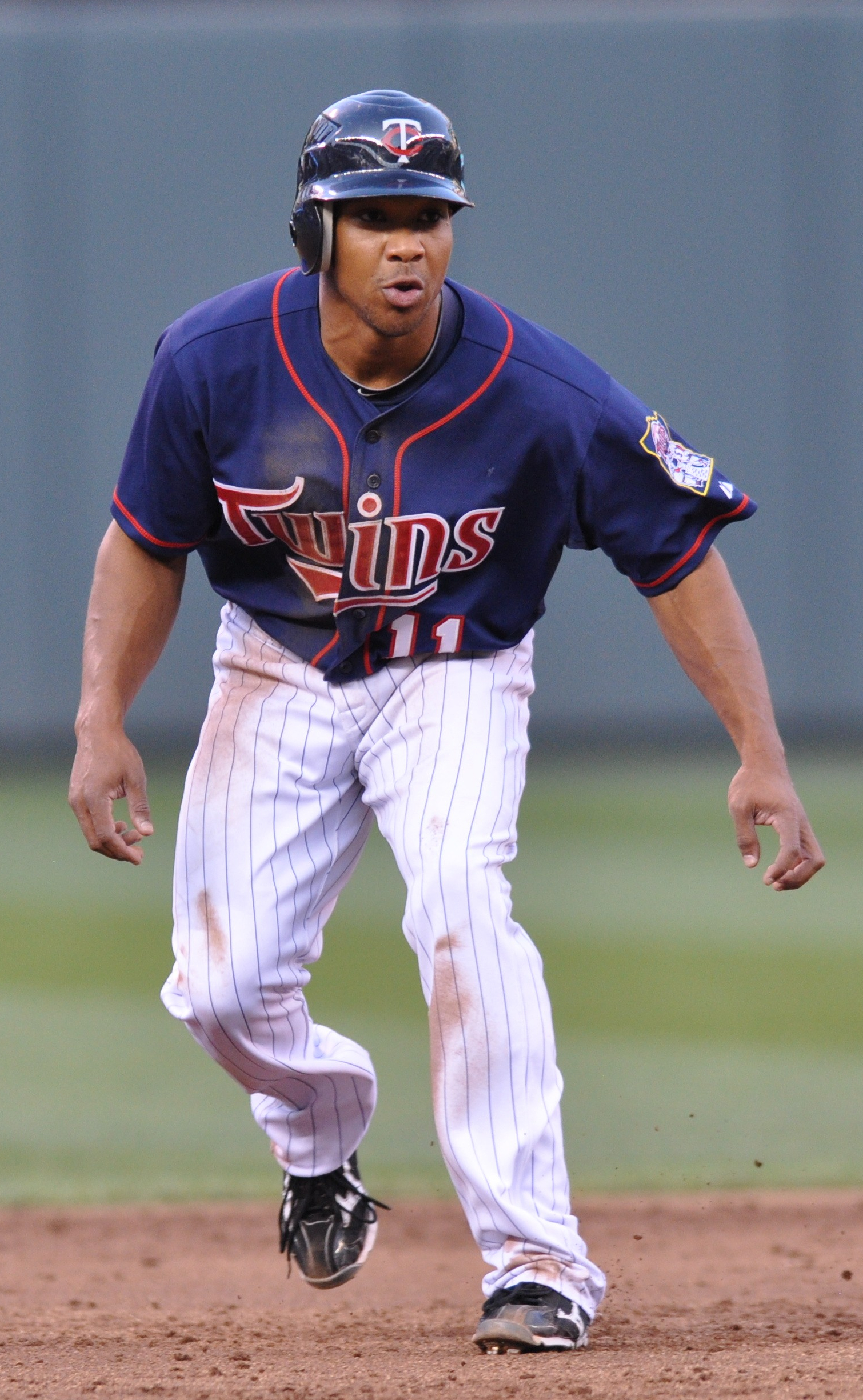
Ben Revere (2008) was selected as the Midwest League's MVP and Prospect of the Year.

- Skye Bolt (2014)
- Matt Chapman (2014) MLB All-Star, 3x MLB Gold Glove Award
- Matt Olson (2013)
- Ryan Dull (2013)
- Miguel Sano (2012) MLB All-Star
- Brian Dozier (2010) MLB All-Star
- Eddie Rosario (2012) 2021 NLCS MVP
- J. J. Hardy (2010) 2 x MLB All-Star
- Aaron Hicks (2010)
- Ben Revere (2008)
- Yangervis Solarte (2008)
- Wilson Ramos (2007) 2014 Tony Conigliaro Award
- Danny Valencia (2007)
- Brian Duensing (2006)
- Matt Garza (2005)
- Evan Meek (2005) MLB All-Star
- Trevor Plouffe (2005)
- Carlos Silva (2005)
- Kevin Slowey (2005)
- Chris Capuano (2004) MLB All-Star
- Yovani Gallardo (2004) MLB All-Star
- Carlos Villanueva (2004)
- Tony Gwynn Jr. (2003)
- Manny Parra (2003)
- Rickie Weeks (2003) MLB All-Star
- Tom Wilhelmsen (2003)
- Mike Adams (2002)
- Prince Fielder (2002–03) 6 x MLB All-Star; 2007 NL Home Run Leader; 2009 NL RBI Leader
- Geoff Jenkins (2001) MLB All-Star
- Mark Leiter (2001)
- Bill Hall (2000)
- Don Money (2000–04, MGR) 4 x MLB All-Star
- Fernando Vina (1999) MLB All-Star
- Chad Fox (1998)
- Mike Matheny (1998)
- José Valentín (1997)
- Ronnie Belliard (1995) MLB All-Star
- Jeff D'Amico (1995, 1997)
- Kevin Seitzer (1994) 2 x MLB All-Star;
- Cory Lidle (1996) Died: Age 34
- Greg Vaughn (1994) 4 x MLB All-Star
- Mike Boddicker (1993) MLB All-Star
- Jeff Cirillo (1992) MLB All-Star
- Teddy Higuera (1992) MLB All-Star
- Darren Holmes (1991)
- Ed Nunez (1991)
- Jim Gantner (1990)
- Bill Krueger (1990)
- Greg Brock (1989)
- Cal Eldred (1989)
- Paul Mirabella (1989)
- Dale Sveum (1989)
- Pat Listach (1988) 1992 AL Rookie of the Year
- Dave Nilsson (1988, 1998) MLB All-Star
- Steve Sparks (1988)
- John Jaha (1987, 1995, 1998) MLB All-Star
- Bill Spiers (1987, 1992)
- Greg Vaughn (1987)
- Narciso Elvira (1987)
- Doug Henry (1986)
- Randy Veres (1986)
- B.J. Surhoff (1985) MLB All-Star
- Tom Candiotti (1984) MLB All-Star
- Jim Morris (1984–85) subject: The Rookie
- Jeff Parrett (1984)
- Chris Bosio (1983–84, 1990) MLB All-Star
- Chuck Crim (1983, 1990)
- Juan Nieves (1983)
- Bill Wegman (1982, 1990)
