= Rivets Stadium =

Stadium in Loves Park, Illinois, United States

Coordinates: 42°19′27″N 88°57′18″W

- Interactive map of Rivets Stadium
- Former names: RiverHawks Stadium (2006, 2012 ); Road Ranger Stadium (2007–2011); Aviators Stadium (2013–2015)
- Location: 4503 Interstate Blvd. Loves Park, Illinois, United States 61111
- Capacity: Baseball: 3,279
- Surface: Natural grass
- Field size: Left - 312'; Left-center - 350'; Center - 380'; Right-center - 350'; Right - 312'

Construction
- Groundbreaking: May 1, 2004
- Opened: May 31, 2006
- Architect: Michael Brady

Tenants
- Rockford RiverHawks (FL/NL) 2006–2012; Rockford Aviators (FL) 2013–2015; Rockford Rivets (NWL) 2016–present

Rivets Stadium is a stadium in Loves Park, Illinois, United States. It is primarily used for baseball, and is the home field of the Rockford Rivets baseball team of the Northwoods League. The stadium has 3,279 seats, but can host crowds of over 4,000. The field is officially known as Rivets Stadium at First Community CU Field through a three-year naming rights agreement for the 2024, 2025, and 2026 seasons. It opened in 2006 as the home of the Rockford RiverHawks, replacing the club's former home, Marinelli Field.

Beginning in 2007, the Rockford College Regents played their home games at Rivets Stadium. The program moved its home games to Pohlman Field in Beloit, Wisconsin, in 2023, before the university broke ground on its own on-campus field in November 2023. The field also hosts some Illinois High School Association Super Sectional games. The stadium was reportedly sold by Northside Community Bank to River Rock Properties of Illinois, LLC for $820,000 on December 28, 2017.

In 2009, when it was known as Road Ranger Stadium, it hosted the Frontier League All-Star Game.
