= Dayton Dragons =

American Minor League baseball team

- Founded in 1988 in Rockford, Illinois; Based in Dayton, Ohio since 2000

Team logo	Cap insignia

Minor league affiliations
- Class: High-A (2021–present)
- Previous classes: Class A (2000–2020)
- League: Midwest League (1988–present)
- Division: East Division

Major league affiliations
- Team: Cincinnati Reds (1999–present)
- Previous teams: Chicago Cubs (1995–1998); Kansas City Royals (1993–1994); Montreal Expos (1988–1992)

Minor league titles
- League titles (0): None
- Division titles (7): 1988; 1993; 1994; 2001; 2011; 2021; 2026
- First-half titles (1): 2026
- Second-half titles (1): 2024

Team data
- Name: Dayton Dragons (2000–present)
- Previous names: Rockford Reds (1999); Rockford Cubbies (1995–1998); Rockford Royals (1993–1994); Rockford Expos (1988–1992)
- Colors: Black, medium green, light gray, white
- Mascots: Heater, Gem, Wink, and Blaze
- Ballpark: Day Air Ballpark (2000–present)
- Previous parks: Marinelli Field (1988–1999)
- Owner/ Operator: Diamond Baseball Holdings
- General manager: Julio Morillo
- Website: milb.com/dayton

The Dayton Dragons are a Minor League Baseball team of the Midwest League and the High-A affiliate of the Cincinnati Reds. They are located in Dayton, Ohio, and play their home games at Day Air Ballpark. In 2011, they broke the record for most consecutive sellouts by a professional sports team, selling out their 815th consecutive game, breaking the record formerly held by the Portland Trail Blazers.

The Dragons came to Dayton in 2000 as the franchise was relocated from Rockford, Illinois. The franchise was previously known as the Rockford Expos (then Royals, Cubbies, and Reds). In 2021, the Dragons and 11 other teams that had previously competed in the Midwest League entered the High-A Central as Major League Baseball completed a large restructuring of Minor League Baseball. This was a temporary name change, with the historical "Midwest League" moniker returning for the 2022 season.

== Day Air Ballpark ==
The team's home park is Day Air Ballpark in Dayton, formerly (until 2020) known as Fifth Third Field. During its first season, the Dragons set a Minor League Baseball Class-A single-season attendance record of 581,853. The Dragons broke that record in 2003 and again in 2004. The Dragons broke the record again in 2010 with a season attendance total of 597,433, which still stands as the Class-A record.

The Dragons have averaged 8,258 fans per game over their 21-year history (through the 2021 season). They have led the Class-A level in attendance in all 24 years of their existence and have finished first among all teams below the Triple-A level for 18 straight seasons, from 2006 to 2019 and in 2021-24 (there was no season in 2020). In 2022, the Dragons' per-game average attendance of 7,935 was first among all 120 teams across Minor League Baseball.

On July 9, 2011, the Dragons officially set a new record of 815 consecutive sellout home games. The sellout streak is the longest across all professional sports in the US, passing the previous record set by the Portland Trail Blazers from 1977 to 1995. On May 10, 2014, the streak of consecutive sellouts reached 1,000 games. After announcing the sellout streak was in jeopardy at the beginning of the 2023 season, the streak reached 1,500 games on August 26, 2023. According to the official team website, every home game in the team's first 20 years (prior to the canceled 2020 season) was a sellout. The streak (which was "paused" in 2020 due to the season being cancelled, and again in 2021 due to all minor league ballparks opening with reduced capacity due to COVID-19 restrictions) now stands at 1,573 consecutive sold-out home games (through the end of the 2024 season), an all-time record for sports in North America.

== Ownership ==
In 2014, the founding ownership group, Peter Guber's Mandalay Baseball Properties, sold the team to Palisades Arcadia Baseball LLC, led by Greg Rosenbaum, Nicholas Sakellariadis, and Michael Savit.

On March 14, 2025, Palisades Arcadia announced that they had agreed to sell the Dragons to Diamond Baseball Holdings, an organization which owns and operates over 40 Minor League clubs including the Louisville Bats, the Reds' Triple A club. The Dragons will remain in Dayton as the Reds' High A affiliate and Robert Murphy and his front office staff will continue to operate the club.

== Achievements ==
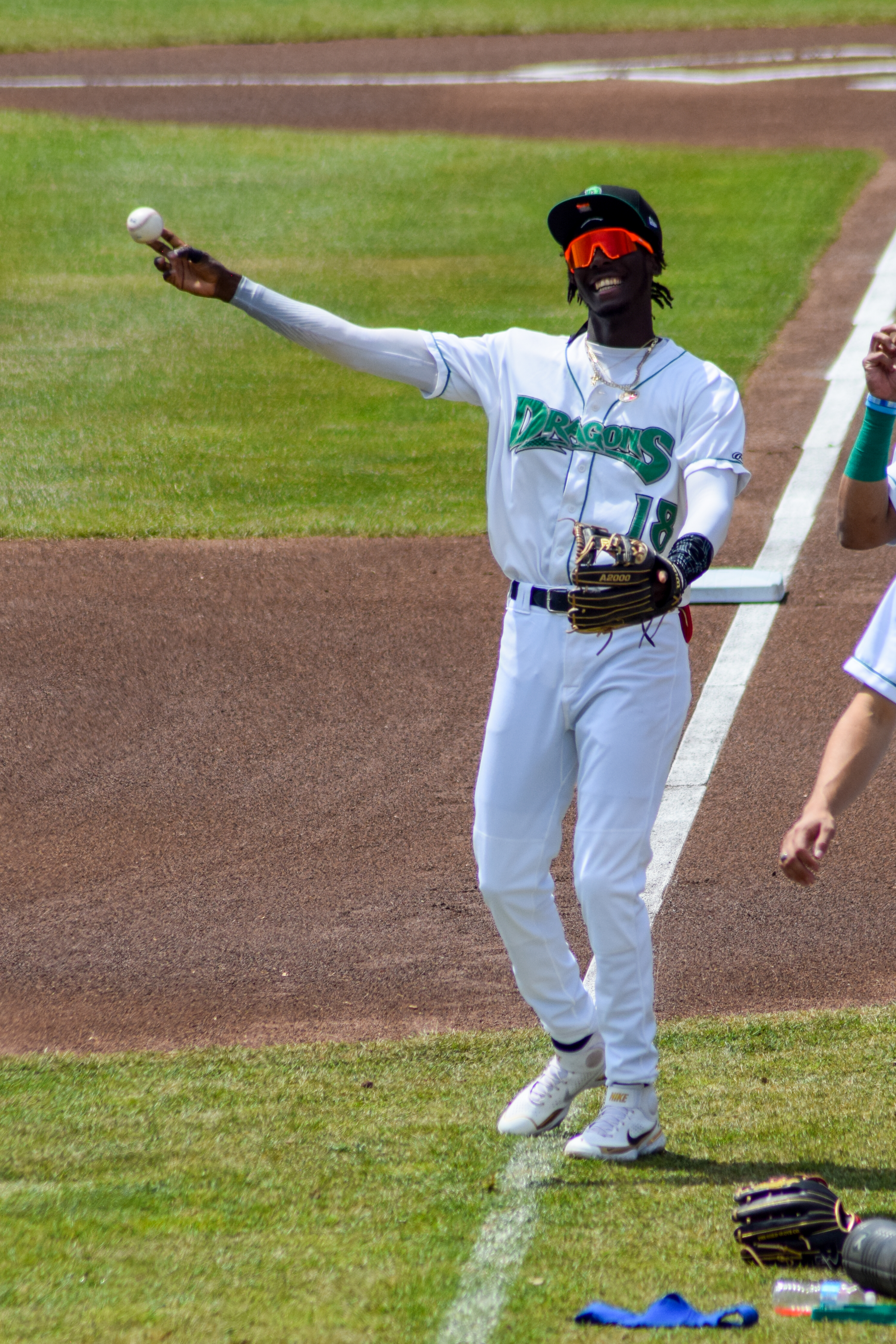
Elly De La Cruz with the Dayton Dragons in 2022.

- The Dragons have led the Midwest League and all of Single A baseball in total season attendance in each of their 23 season, and the #1 for under Triple - A level Ball for the last 17 seasons.
- In 2000, Dragons President Robert Murphy received the Midwest League Executive of the Year Award. He received the award again in 2012.
- In 2004, the Dragons were selected as the winner of the Bob Freitas Award by Baseball America (top Class-A franchise).
- In 2007, the Dragons were selected as one of the "10 Hottest Tickets in Sports" by Sports Illustrated.
- On July 9, 2011, the Dragons set a new record for most consecutive sold-out games (815 total) in all of professional sports. As of the beginning of the 2026 season, the still-in-progress record stands at 1,639 straight games.
- In 2011, Ballpark Digest named the Dragons the "Minor League Baseball Organization of the Year." This honor came during a year in which
  - they set the all-time professional sports sellout streak of 815 (they finished the season at 843 consecutive sellouts)
  - finished 1st in the Midwest League Eastern Division
  - best overall Midwest League record (.593)
  - set franchise records for
    - wins (83–57),
    - wins in a half (48–22 during the second half) ,
    - road wins (38),
    - wins in a month (22 in August);
    - stolen bases (224, including 103 by shortstop Billy Hamilton, which was the 9th highest total ever for a Minor Leaguer);
    - team ERA (3.39);
    - and shutout wins (14);
  - set a Midwest League pitching record for strikeouts (1,292).
- In 2012, the Dragons were a finalist team for the Sports Business Journal "Professional Sports Team of the Year".
- In 2012, the Dragons franchise was selected as the winner of the John H. Johnson President's Trophy. The winning team, chosen from all minor league teams (Single A, Double A, and Triple A), is chosen by the president of Minor League Baseball and given to "the complete baseball franchise—based on franchise stability, contributions to league stability, contributions to baseball in the community, and promotion of the baseball industry." Only two other Midwest Leagues teams have received this award.
- In 2016, Forbes listed the Dragons as the third-most valuable Minor League Baseball team with a value of $45 million, making them the most valuable Class A minor league franchise.
- In 2016, Dragons Vice President of Sponsor Services Brandy Guinaugh was named the Rawlings Woman Executive of the Year for all of Minor League Baseball
- In 2016, 2017, and 2018, the Dragons have been the Midwest League nominee for Minor League Baseball's Charles K. Murphy Patriot Award for outstanding support of U.S. Armed Forces and Veterans.
- In 2018, the Dragons were selected by Dayton Business Journal as the Miami Valley's Customer Service Business of the Year.
- In 2018, Robert Murphy, Dragons President & General Manager, was selected by Baseball America as the Minor League Baseball Executive of the Year.

== Season-by-season records ==
Season	Regular Season				Postseason			
Season	Won	Lost	Win %	Finish	Won	Lost	Win %	Result
2000	70	67	.511	4th in MWL East	2	3	.400	Defeated West Michigan in League Quarterfinals, 2–1; Lost to Michigan in League Semifinals, 2–0
2001	82	57	.590	2nd in MWL East	2	2	.500	Defeated Lansing in League Quarterfinals, 2–0; Lost to South Bend in League Semifinals, 2–0
2002	73	67	.521	4th in MWL East	0	2	.000	Lost to West Michigan in League Quarterfinals, 2–0
2003	61	78	.439	6th in MWL East	–	–	–	Did not Qualify
2004	48	92	.343	6th in MWL East	–	–	–	Did not Qualify
2005	60	79	.432	6th in MWL East	–	–	–	Did not Qualify
2006	67	73	.479	5th in MWL East	–	–	–	Did not Qualify
2007	78	62	.557	3rd in MWL East	1	2	.333	Lost to South Bend in League Quarterfinals, 2–1
2008	66	72	.478	2nd in MWL East	2	2	.500	Defeated Lansing in League Quarterfinals, 2–0; Lost to South Bend In League Semifinals, 2–0
2009	59	80	.425	4th in MWL East	–	–	–	Did not Qualify
2010	53	85	.384	8th in MWL East	–	–	–	Did not Qualify
2011	83	57	.593	1st in MWL East	1	2	.333	Lost to Lansing In League Quarterfinals, 2–1
2012	60	78	.435	8th in MWL East	–	–	–	Did not Qualify
2013	65	74	.468	6th in MWL East	–	–	–	Did not Qualify
2014	68	70	.493	3rd in MWL East	–	–	–	Did not Qualify
2015	71	68	.511	5th in MWL East	–	–	–	Did not Qualify
2016	47	93	.336	8th in MWL East	–	–	–	Did not Qualify
2017	71	69	.507	4th in MWL East	3	3	.500	Defeated West Michigan in League Quarterfinals, 2–1; Lost to Fort Wayne in League Semifinals, 2–1
2018	58	80	.420	8th in MWL East	–	–	–	Did not Qualify
2019	58	82	.414	7th in MWL East	–	–	–	Did not Qualify
2020	0	0	.000	Season Canceled	–	–	–	No playoffs
2021	65	55	.542	T-1st in High-A Central East	–	–	–	Did not Qualify
2022	67	61	.523	1st Half: 2nd in MWL East; 2nd Half: 4th in MWL East	-	-	-	Did not Qualify
2023	67	65	.508	1st Half: 2nd in MWL East; 2nd Half: 4th in MWL East	-	-	-	Did not Qualify
2024	74	58	.566	1st Half: T - 2nd in MWL East; 2nd Half: 1st MWL East	0	2	.000	Lost to Lake County Captains in League Semi- Finals, 0-2
2025	52	76	.406	1st Half: 6th in MWL East; 2nd Half: 4th in MWL East	-	-	-	Did not Qualify
2026	67	63	.515	1st Half: 1st in MWL East; 2nd Half: 5th in MWL East	2	3	.400	Defeated Great Lakes in League Semi-Finals, 2-1; Lost to Quad Cities in League Finals, 2-0
TOTAL	1690	1861	.476	—	13	21	.382	—

== Major league alumni ==
Through the 2025 season, 157 Dragons players have gone on to play in Major League Baseball since the team's move to Dayton in 2000. The following are notable players whose minor league career included playing for the Dayton Dragons, including the years they played in Dayton.

- Austin Kearns (2000)
- Adam Dunn (2000)
- Wily Mo Peña (2001)
- Edwin Encarnación (2001–02)
- Ryan Hanigan (2002–03)
- Todd Coffey (2002–03)
- Joey Votto (2003–04)
- Chris Dickerson (2004)
- Homer Bailey (2005)
- Johnny Cueto (2006)
- Travis Wood (2006)
- Adam Rosales (2006)
- Jay Bruce (2006)
- Drew Stubbs (2007)
- Justin Turner (2007)
- Chris Heisey (2007)
- Zack Cozart (2007–08)
- Devin Mesoraco (2008)
- Todd Frazier (2007–08)
- Didi Gregorius (2010)
- Ronald Torreyes (2010–11)
- Billy Hamilton (2011)
- Tucker Barnhart (2011)
- Michael Lorenzen (2013)
- Jesse Winker (2013)
- Sal Romano (2013–2014)
- Amir Garrett (2013–14)
- Tyler Mahle (2015)
- Aristides Aquino (2015)
- Nick Senzel (2015)
- Tanner Rainey (2016)
- José Siri (2016–17)
- Jonathan India (2018)
- Noah Davis (2021)
- Elly De La Cruz (2022)

== Managers and coaches ==
The Dragons have had 13 managers in their history:

- Freddie Benavides (2000)
- Donnie Scott (2001–2003, 2007–2008)
- Alonzo Powell (2004–2005)
- Billy Gardner, Jr. (2006)
- Todd Benzinger (2009–2010)
- Delino DeShields (2011–2012)
- José Nieves (2013–2015)
- Dick Schofield (2016)
- Luis Bolivar (2017–19)
- José Moreno (2021)
- Bryan LaHair (2022-2023)
- Vince Harrison, Jr. (2024-2025)
- Julio Morillo (2026–present)

Additionally, past Dragons coaching staffs have included three inductees into the Cincinnati Reds Hall of Fame as players:

- Chris Sabo (2005 Dragons hitting coach)
- Ken Griffey, Sr. (2010 Dragons hitting coach)
- Tom Browning (2012, 2015 Dragons pitching coach)

== Media ==
Radio: All Dragons home and road games are broadcast on radio on 980 WONE, with Tom Nichols as the lead broadcaster. The broadcasts are also available via the internet at daytondragons.com and wone.com and on mobile devices via the Dragons mobile app. Dragons radio broadcasts moved to WONE starting with the 2011 season after Dragons games aired on WING 1410 AM from 2003 to 2010 and on WHIO 1290 AM from 2000 to 2002. Nichols has served as the Dragons Director of Broadcasting and lead play-by-play announcer since the 2008 season. Mike Vander Woude was the team's primary broadcaster from 2000 to 2007. All home and road games have been broadcast throughout the Dragons history.

Television: The Dragons have televised 25 games per season since the 2011 season with Dragons Director of Broadcasting Tom Nichols serving as the lead announcer. In 2016, telecasts moved to WBDT (Dayton's CW) as games appeared on an over-the-air network station for the first time in Dragons history. Since the 2016 season, WDTN sports director Jack Pohl has teamed with Nichols on Dragons television broadcasts. From 2001 to 2010, the Dragons television schedule included 15 games per season before the number of broadcasts was increased to 25 in 2011. The Dragons televised five games in their inaugural season of 2000. Dragons games were televised on WHIO-TV digital channel 7.2 (Time Warner Cable channels 23 and 372) from 2009 to 2015. Games were televised on Time Warner Cable from 2000 to 2008. Over the years, Dragons color commentators on television broadcasts have included Joe Nuxhall, Ken Griffey Sr., Tom Browning, Ron Oester, Bill Doran, Tommy Helms, Todd Benzinger, Doug Bair, Jeff Reboulet, and Hal McCoy, among others.

== Roster ==
Dayton Dragons roster
Players	Coaches/Other
Pitchers: 36 Brady Afthim; 22 Bryce Archie; 26 Edgar Colon; 24 Victor Diaz; 27 Jacob Edwards; 21 Trent Hodgdon; 32 Jordan Little; 39 David Lorduy; 17 Kyle McCoy; 18 Jose Montero; 37 Mason Morris; 11 JeanPierre Ortiz; 28 Graham Osman; 34 Drew Pestka; 20 Jimmy Romano; 31 Andrew Shaffner; 27 Cole Schoenwetter; 33 Stharlin Torres; 14 Deivi Villafana; Catchers: 12 John Michael Faile; 3 Jacob Friend; 7 Ryan McCrystal; -- Diego Omana; Infielders: 38 Victor Acosta; 2 Alfredo Alcantara; 5 Johnny Ascanio; 35 Eric Becker; 10 Ty Doucette; 15 Justin Lebron; 16 Tyson Lewis; Outfielders: 9 Kyle Henley; 23 Mason Neville; 13 Esmith Pineda; 29 Damian Ruiz; 6 Kien Vu	Manager: 4 Julio Morillo; Coaches: 19 Willie Blair (pitching); 32 Troy Gingrich (hitting); 44 Gustavo Molina (coach); 25 Eric Richardson (coach); 60-day injured list: -- Ricky Cabrera (Full Season); 31 Reynardo Cruz; 26 Ty Floyd; 40 Ovis Portes; -- Anthony Stephan (Full Season); 7-day injured list; * On Cincinnati Reds 40-man roster; ~ Development list; # Rehab assignment; ∞ Reserve list; ‡ Restricted list; § Suspended list; † Temporarily inactive list; Roster updated September 16, 2026; Transactions; → More rosters: MiLB • Midwest League; → Cincinnati Reds minor league players

== Player milestones in Dayton Dragons history ==
- Austin Kearns hit home runs in eight consecutive games from July 17–24, 2000.
- In 2002, Bobby Basham pitched three consecutive nine-inning complete game shutouts for the Dragons. Over 27 innings, he allowed just two walks with 34 strikeouts and surrendered only 11 hits.
- Donald Lutz became the first and only Dragons player to hit for the cycle on July 21, 2011, vs. the Peoria Chiefs. He did it in reverse order within the first five innings of the game (home run, triple, double, single).
- Billy Hamilton became the first player in the history of the Cincinnati Reds organization to compile at least 100 stolen bases in a season when he stole 103 in 2011.
- Seth Mejias-Brean hit an ultimate grand slam home run (game-ending home run with team trailing by three runs) to defeat Beloit on July 18, 2013. Mejias-Brean's walk-off homer came with one out and the bases loaded in the bottom of the 9th, trailing 6–3.
- On May 20, 2017, three Dayton pitchers combined for the first nine-inning no-hitter in Dragons history. Scott Moss, Carlos Machorro, and Brian Hunter combined to no-hit the Bowling Green Hot Rods.
- On July 31, 2017, José Siri extended his hitting streak to 36 consecutive games to break the Midwest League record that had stood since 1977 (Tony Toups, Waterloo, 35). Siri's streak eventually reached 39 straight games.
