= Rockford Foresters =

Former collegiate summer baseball team based in Illinois

Rockford Foresters
Founded	2010
League	Midwest Collegiate League (2010–2013)
Based in	Rockford, Illinois

The Rockford Foresters were a collegiate summer baseball team based in Rockford, Illinois. They played in the Midwest Collegiate League (MCL), which was later renamed the Northern League.

== History ==
The Foresters began play in 2010. In 2012, their third season, owner Joe Stefani described the club as his first venture into sports ownership; the team played in the MCL alongside the DuPage County Hounds.

The Foresters played at Marinelli Field in Rockford. A 2012 Eastern Illinois University release listed Dane Sauer among the players assigned to the Foresters for that summer, confirming the team's collegiate-summer composition. The Northern League's alumni database records Foresters players from 2011 through 2013.
