= League of the North =

League of the North may refer to:

- Lega Nord, an Italian nationalist party
- another term for the Second League of Armed Neutrality

== See also ==
- Northern Alliance (disambiguation)
- Northern League (disambiguation)
