= Trinity Christian College =

Private Christian college in Palos Heights, Illinois, U.S.

Coordinates: 41°40′8.2″N 87°46′58.7″W

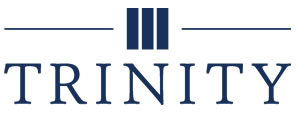
- Motto: Unum Deum In Tres Laudamus Te
- Motto in English: Glory to God Alone
- Type: Private college
- Active: 1959–2026
- Affiliations: CCCU CIC
- President: Jeanine Mozie (acting)
- Faculty: 55
- Students: 854 (fall 2024)
- Undergraduates: 825 (fall 2024)
- Postgraduates: 29 (fall 2024)
- Location: Palos Heights, Illinois, United States
- Campus: Suburban, 130 acres (52.6 ha), Illinois
- Colors: Navy Blue & Columbia Blue
- Nickname: Trolls
- Sporting affiliations: NAIA – CCAC; NCCAA Division I – North Central
- Mascot: Troll
- Website: www.trnty.edu

Trinity Christian College was a private Christian college in Palos Heights, Illinois, United States. It was founded in 1959 by a group of individuals from the Chicagoland area who wanted to establish a college providing students with a Christian higher education in a Reformed tradition as a college in Illinois. The college offered degrees in more than 70 programs of study. In 2023 and 2024, it reduced its number of employees by ten percent. On November 4, 2025, Trinity Christian College announced it would close at the end of the 2025-26 academic calendar.

== Campus ==
The Martin and Janet Ozinga Chapel, a 1200-seat facility, provided practice and rehearsal rooms for the music department, and housed the campus ministries program under the direction of the campus chaplain. The Grand Lobby hosted a variety of events beneath its stained glass window, the first of a series of stained glass panels hung throughout the building designed to celebrate Trinity Christian's mission in Reformed higher education.

The Heritage Science Center comprised 38,000-square feet (3,500 m^{2}) of classroom and lab space for chemistry, biology, and physics programs, as well as classrooms and a lecture hall for technology and computer science studies.

The Art and Communication Center (ARCC) provided Trinity Christian students with art and design studios, a graphic design lab, student gallery, The Marg Kallemeyn (black box) Theatre for the performing arts, and the Seerveld Gallery that welcomed guest artists and student artists.

New athletics fields and a new athletics complex were developed with completion of the DeVos Athletics and Recreation Center in the autumn of 2013. The facility featured a state of the art lab for exercise students, a bouldering wall, and a fitness center.

== Academics ==
Trinity Christian College claimed a cohesive approach to its core curriculum of philosophy, history, English, and theology. Although students were drawn from predominantly Reformed and Presbyterian church backgrounds, students also came from other Christian traditions such as Baptist, Lutheran, Methodist, Pentecostal, and Roman Catholic.

=== Accreditation and memberships ===
Trinity Christian College was a member of the Council for Christian Colleges and Universities (CCCU) and the Council for Independent Colleges (CIC). The college was accredited by the Higher Learning Commission.

=== Adult undergraduate programs ===
In 1998 Trinity Christian College opened the TRACS department, now called Adult Undergraduate Programs, to serve the needs of the non-traditional student. Adults 23 years of age and older could complete their college degree through this program.

=== Graduate studies ===
In 2012 Trinity Christian College began offering two graduate level programs: a Master of Arts in Special Education and a Master of Arts in Counseling Psychology.

== Athletics ==
The Trinity Christian athletic teams were called the Trolls. The college was a member of the National Association of Intercollegiate Athletics (NAIA), primarily competing in the Chicagoland Collegiate Athletic Conference (CCAC) since the 1987–1988 academic year. The teams were also a member of the National Christian College Athletic Association (NCCAA), primarily competing as an independent in the North Central Region of the Division I level.

Trinity Christian competed in 14 intercollegiate varsity sports: Men's sports included baseball, basketball, cross country, golf, soccer, track & field and volleyball. Women's sports included basketball, cross country, golf, soccer, softball, track & field and volleyball.

The women's soccer team collected Trinity's first national title by winning the NCCAA National Soccer Tournament in 2005 and returned to the NCCAA national finals in 2007.

== Closure ==
On November 4, 2025, Trinity announced it would close after the 2025-2026 academic year. The college's board of trustees made this decision after reviewing the college's financial outlook. Reasons cited were financial challenges post-COVID, declining enrollment, competition for students, and shifting donor support. According to Inside Higher Ed, the college "operated at a loss in eight of its last 10 fiscal years and enrollment shrank from 1,068 in fall 2019 to 872 last year."

Academic records and transcripts were put under the custodianship of Calvin University in Grand Rapids, Michigan.
