= ABC Supply Stadium =

Baseball stadium in Beloit, Wisconsin, home to the Beloit Sky Carp

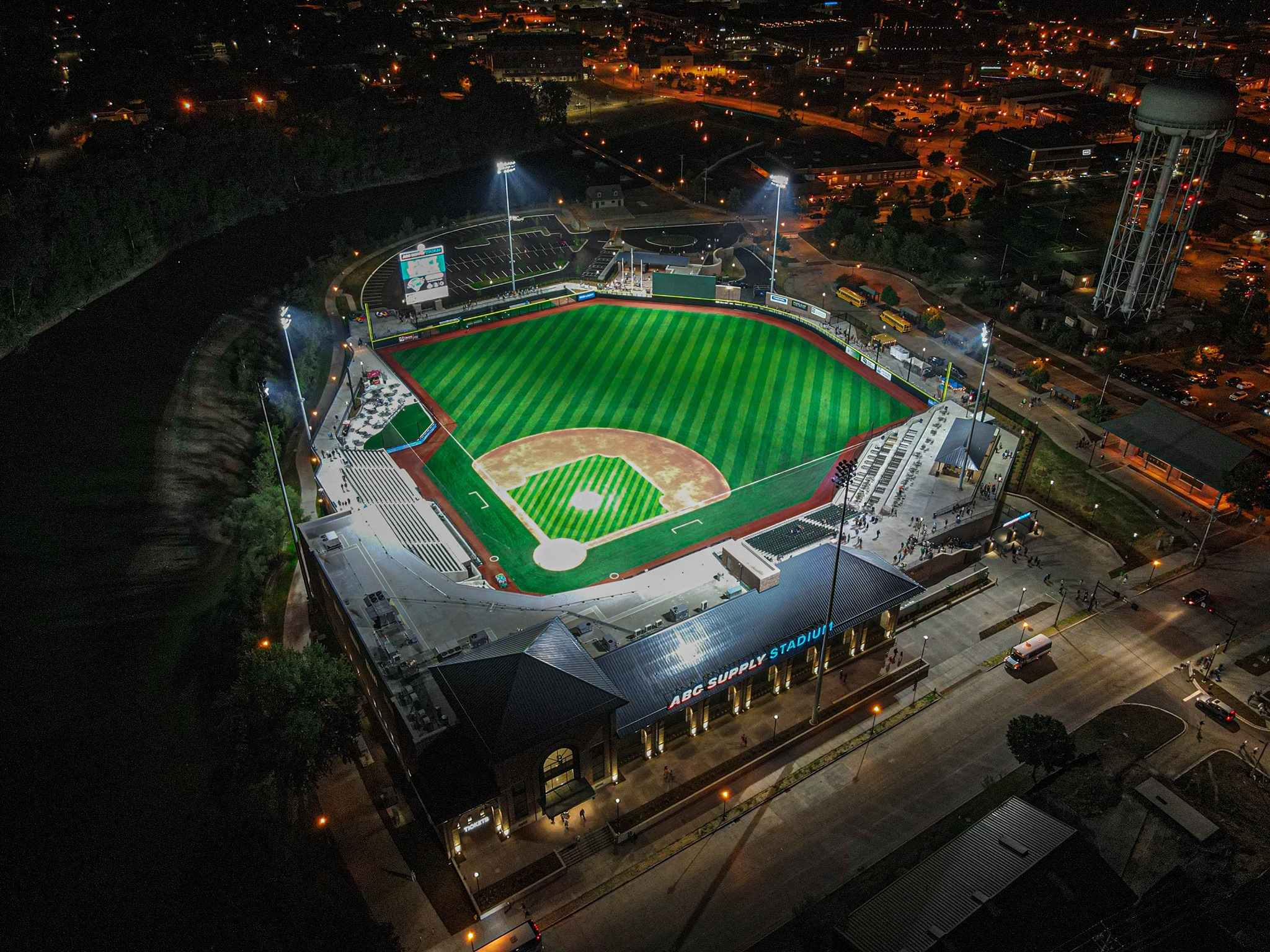
- ABC Supply Stadium on Opening Night

- Location within Wisconsin Location within the United States
- Interactive map of ABC Supply Stadium
- Address: 217 Shirland Ave; Beloit, Wisconsin 53511
- Coordinates: 42°29′51.5″N 89°02′24.3″W
- Owner: Riverbend Stadium Authority
- Capacity: 3,850
- Surface: Artificial Turf
- Public transit: Beloit Transit

Construction
- Groundbreaking: June 15, 2020
- Opened: August 3, 2021
- Architect: Jones Petrie Rafinski

Tenant
- Beloit Sky Carp (MWL) 2021–present

ABC Supply Stadium is a baseball park in Beloit, Wisconsin, and the home field of the Beloit Sky Carp, the Midwest League affiliate of the Miami Marlins. It opened on August 3, 2021, replacing Harry C. Pohlman Field. ABC Supply purchased the stadium's naming rights for 20 years.

== History ==
Plans for a replacement for Pohlman Field gained urgency in 2019, when the possible contraction of Minor League Baseball teams placed Beloit's franchise at risk because of its outdated facility. A local group developed a privately financed replacement that met new facility standards. The nonprofit Riverbend Stadium Authority owns the stadium and leases its site from the City of Beloit. Hendricks Commercial Properties led development of the stadium site.

Construction began on June 15, 2020. The $37 million stadium was completed in 13 months. The Snappers began the 2021 season at Pohlman Field before moving to the new stadium, where they played their first game against the Wisconsin Timber Rattlers on August 3.

In the stadium's first full season in 2022, the Sky Carp drew 102,794 fans, setting a Beloit professional-baseball single-season attendance record. The team raised the record to 112,808 over 61 home openings in 2025.

== Features ==
The stadium has a listed capacity of 3,850; baseball seating at opening was 3,500, while field seating could increase capacity to 6,000 for concerts and similar events. The three-level, 67,000-square-foot (6,200 m^{2}) brick structure includes a 360-degree concourse, offices, player facilities, batting tunnels, and entertainment areas. Its playing surface is artificial turf with dirt basepaths, supporting events beyond professional baseball. The stadium is along the Rock River in downtown Beloit, with its southern edge a few hundred feet from the Wisconsin-Illinois state line.
