= Marinelli Field =

Baseball stadium in Rockford, Illinois

- Interactive map of Marinelli Field
- Full name: Louis F. Marinelli Field
- Address: 101 15th Avenue
- Location: Rockford, Illinois, U.S.
- Coordinates: 42.249555°N 89.100924°W
- Owner: Rockford Park District
- Operator: Rock River Valley Baseball
- Capacity: 3,100 (2002–present); 4,200 (1988–2001)
- Type: Baseball park
- Surface: Grass
- Field size: Left field: 335 ft (102 m); Center field: 405 ft (123 m); Right field: 335 ft (102 m)

Construction
- Built: 1988
- Opened: 1988
- Cost: $1.5 million

Tenants
- Rockford Expos (MWL) (1988–1992); Rockford Royals (MWL) (1993–1994); Rockford Cubbies (MWL) (1995–1998); Rockford Reds (MWL) (1999); Rockford RiverHawks (Frontier League) (2002–2005); Rockford Foresters (Midwest Collegiate League) (2010–2012)

Marinelli Field (officially Louis F. Marinelli Field) is a baseball park in Rockford, Illinois. Located within Blackhawk Park along the Rock River, it is owned and operated by the Rockford Park District. The stadium was the primary home for professional baseball in Rockford from its opening in 1988 until 2005, when the Rockford RiverHawks moved to the newly constructed RiverHawks Stadium (now Rivets Stadium) in Loves Park, Illinois.

== History ==
Marinelli Field was constructed in 1988 at a cost of $1.5 million to replace the aging Beyer Stadium as the home of Rockford's minor league baseball teams. It was named in honor of Louis F. Marinelli, a long-time Rockford Park District Commissioner and the late manager of the Rockford Blackhawks, a local athletic team that played at Blackhawk Park.

The stadium hosted the Midwest League All-Star Game in 1991. After the departure of affiliated minor league baseball in 1999, the stadium hosted the independent Rockford RiverHawks of the Frontier League from 2002 to 2005.

=== Decline and restoration ===
Following the RiverHawks' move to Loves Park in 2006, Marinelli Field saw a period of reduced use and physical decline. The Rockford Foresters, members of the Midwest Collegiate League, played at the field from 2010 to 2012, before losing the stadium lease to the Rockford Aviators for the 2013 season.

In 2023, local resident David Aarvig led a community effort to restore the neglected facility. The restoration included cleaning the stands, repairing the field, and improving the amenities. The stadium held a "grand reopening" on May 26, 2023, hosting a high school baseball tournament.

== Current use ==
As of 2026, the venue hosts amateur baseball tournaments, showcases, high school games, and practices.

== Tenants ==
The stadium has hosted several professional and collegiate baseball teams:

Team	League	Years
Rockford Expos	Midwest League	1988–1992
Rockford Royals	Midwest League	1993–1994
Rockford Cubbies	Midwest League	1995–1998
Rockford Reds	Midwest League	1999
Rockford RiverHawks	Frontier League	2002–2005
Rockford Foresters	Midwest Collegiate League	2010–2012

The four Midwest League franchises were all affiliated farm teams that eventually relocated to Dayton, Ohio, to become the Dayton Dragons in 2000.

== See also ==
- Beyer Stadium
- Rivets Stadium
