= Indiana University Northwest =

Public university in Gary, Indiana, U.S.

Coordinates: 41.556629°N 87.337875°W

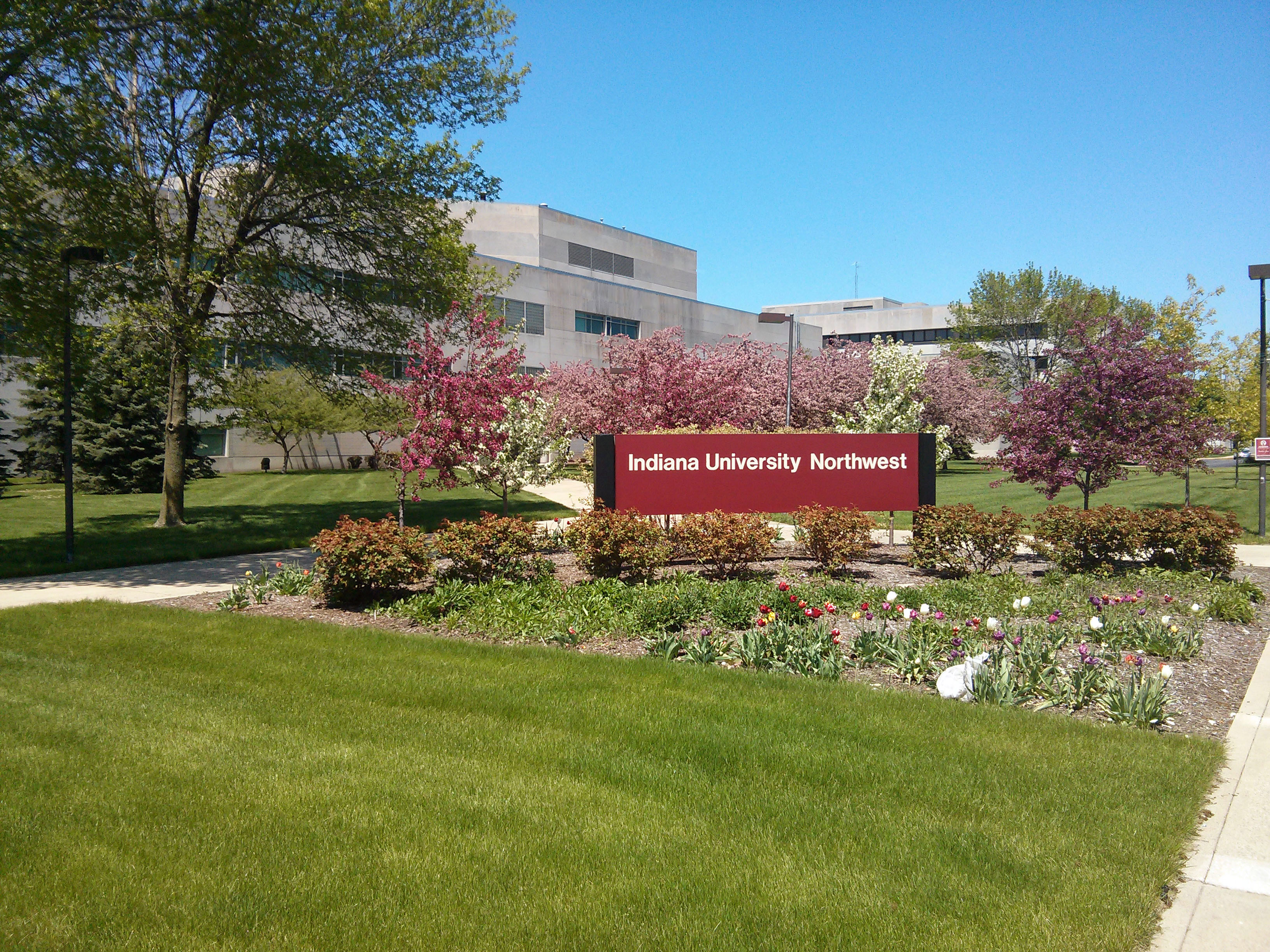
- Other name: IU Northwest or IUN
- Type: Public university
- Established: 1963; 63 years ago
- Parent institution: Indiana University System
- Academic affiliations: CUMU
- Chancellor: Arrick Jackson
- Faculty: 180^{[3]}
- Students: 3,198 (fall 2022)
- Undergraduates: 2,860 (fall 2022)
- Postgraduates: 338 (fall 2022)
- Location: Gary, Indiana, United States
- Campus: 43 acres (17.40 ha)^{[2]}; Urban
- Colors: Cream & Crimson
- Nickname: RedHawks
- Sporting affiliations: NAIA – CCAC
- Mascot: Rufus the RedHawk
- Website: northwest.iu.edu

Indiana University Northwest (IU Northwest or IUN) is a public university in Gary, Indiana, United States. It is one of seven regional campuses of Indiana University and was established in 1963. The university enrolls approximately 3,500 degree-seeking traditional and non-traditional students along with 1,800 dual-credit students.

== Academics ==
IU Northwest offers 70 undergraduate degree programs and over 200 degrees, academic certificates and pre-professional programs.

It is located on a 43-acre (17.40 ha) campus located in Northwest Indiana. Class sizes average 30 students, and the faculty-student ratio is 14:1.

Programs, both part- and full-time, are taught during days, evenings and weekends, and lead to certificates, associate, bachelor's and master's degrees. There are more than 170 full-time and more than 200 part-time faculty, more than 75% of whom have doctorates or the highest degree available in their field.

There is a network of 29,000 alumni.

In 2023, Indiana University Northwest was censured by the American Association of University Professors over the firing of a tenured professor.

== College, schools, and divisions ==
Indiana University Northwest offers over 200 degree programs, academic certificates, and pre-professional programs in six schools and colleges:

- School of the Arts
- College of Arts and Sciences
- School of Business and Economics
- School of Education
- College of Health and Human Services
- School of Public and Environmental Affairs (SPEA)

== Student enrollment ==
In the fall of 2022, there were 3,198 students enrolled at IU Northwest. Of that:

- 40% first-generation students
- 49% underrepresented students of color
- 32% over the age of 25
- 90% undergraduate and 10% graduate students
- 65% full-time and 35% part-time students
- 75% female and 25% male
- 95% residents of Indiana

== Financial aid ==
Nearly 75% of IU Northwest students receive some sort of financial aid and tuition is about $8,000 a year. IU Northwest offers support for first-generation college students, academic advising, counseling services, a number of scholarships and grants, loans, tuition reimbursement, student employment, private loans and the Midwest Student Exchange Program.

== Campus buildings ==
IU Northwest is located in Gary, Indiana. The campus sits on 42 acres, and facilities include a $45 million Arts & Sciences Building.

== Athletics ==
The Indiana–Northwest (IU Northwest) athletic teams are called the RedHawks. The university is a member of the National Association of Intercollegiate Athletics (NAIA), primarily competing in the Chicagoland Collegiate Athletic Conference (CCAC) since the 2019–20 academic year. The RedHawks previously competed as an NAIA Independent within the Association of Independent Institutions (AII) from 1998–99 (when the school joined the NAIA) to 2018–19.

IU Northwest (IUN) competes in seven intercollegiate varsity sports, including: basketball (men's/women's), cross-country (men's/women's), soccer (men's/women's) and volleyball (women's). It also fields a club competitive dance team. Former sports included men's & women's golf and men's & women's tennis.

== Rankings ==
The university was ranked #127-166 in "Regional Universities Midwest" and #45-56 in "Top Public Schools" in 2023 by U.S. News & World Report.

== Notes ==
1. ^{1} ^{endowment} "America's Best Colleges 2008". U.S. News & World Report.
2. ^{2} ^{real_estate} "FactBook > Physical Facilities > Real Estate Acreage". Indiana University system. Archived from the original on December 8, 2004.
3. ^{3} ^{full-time_faculty} "FactBook > Personnel > Number of Faculty > full-time". Indiana University system. Archived from the original on February 15, 2008.
