= Northern League (collegiate summer baseball) =

American collegiate baseball league

- Formerly: Midwest Collegiate League
- Sport: Baseball
- Founded: 2010
- President: Don Popravak
- No. of teams: 6
- Country: United States
- Most recent champion: Elkhart County Miracle (2024)
- Most titles: Northwest Indiana Oilmen (4)
- Website: thenorthernleague.com

The Northern League was a collegiate summer baseball league consisting of teams in Indiana. It was named the Midwest Collegiate League (MCL) from 2010 to 2021. The league has not operated since the 2025 season.

== History ==
Formed in 2010, as a four-team summer collegiate wood bat league, MCL played their first season in the summer of 2011. The original four members were the Chicago Zephyrs, Rockford Foresters, Southland Vikings and Will County CrackerJacks. Teams play a 45 game schedule with league playoffs. The league all-star game is played sometime around mid-season.

The league expanded to eight teams for their second season in 2012, with the addition of the DeKalb County Liners, DuPage County Hounds, Illinois Lincolns and Northwest Indiana Oilmen. Two of the teams (Illinois and Will County) failed to complete the season schedule.

Six teams made up the 2013 season as the league welcomed the Lexington Snipes, replacing DeKalb County.

MCL stayed steady with six teams with the addition of the Joliet Admirals (2014) and Michigan City Lakers (2015) replacing two teams (Rockford in 2014; Chicago in 2015) who ceased operations.

Before the 2016 season, the Lexington Snipes announced that they would sit out the season. The league continued with six teams with the addition of the Bloomington Bobcats.

The Crestwood Panthers, the newest team in the Midwest Collegiate League, replaced the Michigan City Lakers before the 2017 season.

Before the 2018 season, the Joliet Admirals became the Joliet Generals.

During the 2020 season, the MCL Minutemen made their debut and stayed in the league for two seasons.

After the 2021 season, the Midwest Collegiate League rebranded itself to the Northern League. The Northern League was a name used by several baseball leagues between 1902 and 2010 as is described on the pages listed at Northern League.

For the 2023 season, the Joliet Generals relocated from Illinois to Griffith, Indiana as the Griffith Generals; the Crestwood Panthers moved to Highland, Indiana as the Indiana Panthers; and the Chicago American Giants were replaced by the Elkhart County Miracle in Nappanee, Indiana. With these changes, all of the league's teams are located in Indiana.

== Teams ==
=== Current teams ===
Team	City	Home Ballpark	Year Joined
Elkhart County Miracle	Elkhart, Ind.	Elkhart High School	2023
Griffith Generals	Griffith, Ind.	Griffith High School	2014
Indiana Panthers	Highland, Ind.	Highland High School	2017
Lake County Corn Dogs	Crown Point, Ind.	Legacy Fields	2022
Northwest Indiana Oilmen	Whiting, Ind.	Oil City Stadium	2012
Southland Vikings	Hammond, Ind.	Dowling Park	2011

=== Former teams ===
- Chicago Zephyrs (2011–14)
- Chicago American Giants (2019–22)
- DeKalb County Liners (2012)
- Illinois Lincolns (2012)
- MCL Minutemen (2020–21)
- Michigan City Lakers (2015–16)
- Rockford Foresters (2011–13)
- Will County CrackerJacks (2011–12)

== Champions ==
Championship series are a best-of three.

Season	Winner	Runner-up	Result
2011	Will County CrackerJacks	Rockford Foresters	2–1
2012	Northwest Indiana Oilmen	DeKalb County Liners	2–0
2013	Southland Vikings	Northwest Indiana Oilmen	2–0
2014	Southland Vikings	DuPage County Hounds	2–0
2015	DuPage County Hounds	Lexington Snipes	2–1
2016	Northwest Indiana Oilmen	DuPage County Hounds	2–1
2017	Southland Vikings	Bloomington Bobcats	2–1
2018	Northwest Indiana Oilmen	DuPage County Hounds	2–1
2019	Bloomington Bobcats	Northwest Indiana Oilmen	2–0
2020	DuPage County Hounds	Northwest Indiana Oilmen	2–1
2021	Joliet Generals	Northwest Indiana Oilmen	2–1
2022	Lake County Corn Dogs	Northwest Indiana Oilmen	2–0
2023	Northwest Indiana Oilmen	Lake County Corn Dogs	2–0
2024	Elkhart County Miracle	Northwest Indiana Oilmen	2–1
