= Elkhart County Miracle =

Amateur baseball team based in Elkhart County, Indiana, US

Information
- League: Northern League
- Location: Elkhart, Indiana
- Founded: 2013
- League championships: 1
- Ownership: Craig Wallin
- Website: https://elkhartcountymiracle.com/

The Elkhart County Miracle is a collegiate baseball team based in Elkhart County, Indiana; the team plays in the collegiate Northern League.

== History ==
Originally set to be a charter member of a newly resurrected Northern League in independent professional baseball which was titled "Northern League of Professional Baseball", the Miracle was set to play in 2014 following the construction of a stadium located at the former American Countryside Farmer's Market site in Elkhart.

As of mid-2014, stadium construction delays ended any chance of Elkhart fielding a team for that season. In October 2014, team president and founder Craig Wallin said that a 2015 start was also doubtful, but remained confident the stadium would be built and the Miracle would take the field. Ultimately, the new Northern League was never resurrected, meaning the Elkhart County Miracle never came to fruition.

On March 23, 2023, it was announced that the Elkhart County Miracle would join a different incarnation of the Northern League in collegiate baseball. The team's first home stadium was NorthWood Field of Dreams in Nappanee, Indiana. The Miracle played its first game on May 31, 2023.

The Miracle won the Northern League championship in 2024.
