= Purdue Northwest Lions =

- University: Purdue University Northwest
- Nickname: Lions
- NCAA: Division II
- Conference: Great Lakes Intercollegiate Athletic Conference (GLIAC)
- Athletic director: Rick Costello
- Location: Hammond, Indiana; Westville, Indiana
- Varsity teams: 19
- Basketball arena: John Friend Court
- Ice hockey arena: Kube Sports Complex
- Baseball stadium: Laborers' Local 41 Field
- Softball stadium: Fifth Third Bank Field
- Soccer stadium: Pepsi Field at Dowling Park
- Tennis venue: Community Hospital Tennis Complex
- Website: pnwathletics.com

The Purdue Northwest Lions are the athletic teams that represent Purdue University Northwest, jointly located in the cities of Westville, Indiana and Hammond in Indiana, in NCAA Division II intercollegiate sports. The Lions primarily compete in the Great Lakes Intercollegiate Athletic Conference (GLIAC), which they joined in provisionally in 2017 and fully in 2019. Until June 30, 2026, the teams were known as the Pride.

The Lions previously competed in the Chicagoland Collegiate Athletic Conference (CCAC) of the National Association of Intercollegiate Athletics (NAIA) only during the 2016–17 school year.

== History ==
Purdue–Northwest was formed in 2016 by the combination of Purdue–Calumet (PUC; located in Hammond, Indiana and competing as the Purdue Calumet Peregrines) and Purdue–North Central (PUNC; located in Westville, Indiana and competing as the Purdue North Central Panthers). Purdue–North Central joined the CCAC from 2004–05 to 2015–16; while Purdue–Calumet joined the CCAC from 1973–74 to 1974–75, and from 1993–94 to 2015–16.

On September 27, 2016, Purdue–Northwest (PUNW) gained provisional acceptance into the NCAA Division II ranks as a provisional member of the GLIAC, starting the 2017–18 school year. As of the 2019–20 school year, the Lions became full-time NCAA D-II members of the GLIAC.

== Varsity sports ==
=== Men's sports ===
- Baseball
- Basketball
- Cross Country
- Esports
- Golf
- Ice hockey
- Soccer
- Tennis
- Track and field

=== Women's sports ===
- Basketball
- Cross Country
- Esports
- Golf
- Soccer
- Softball
- Tennis
- Track and field
- Volleyball
- Stunt

== Facilities ==
Both campus locations offer a Fitness Center and Recreation Center. Memberships are free to every current, enrolled student. However, a fee is applied to other memberships, i.e. alumni, public, employee, etc. The Fitness Center also provides students with Intramural opportunities. With over 40 activities, any student, regardless of skill level and experience, can participate. Also, group exercise classes are available throughout the year for fitness center members.

Another major location is Dowling Park, an outdoor facility home to PNW Lions Athletic Teams and a partnership with the City of Hammond. The complex started to be built on December 9, 2013, and was completed the Fall of 2015.

Other facilities include:

- Laborers' Local 41 Field — Spring of 2015, the field was debuted. It is located in Dowling Park and is the official home of PNW baseball.
- Fifth Third Bank Field — Spring of 2015, the field was debuted. It is, also, located in Dowling Park and is the official home of PNW softball.
- John Friend Court — This basketball court is located at the Fitness and Recreational Center in Hammond. It is home to the Lions volleyball and women's and men's basketball teams.
- Paul K. & Barbara Graegin Academic Excellence Center — The center is located in the Hammond Fitness and Recreational building and was funded by Barbara and the late Paul Graegin. The center offers a learning space for student-athletes that include computers, printers, and a place for presentations.
- Pepsi Field — Completed in spring 2015 and opened in August 2015, this field in Dowling Park is home of PNW's men and women's soccer teams.
- H.D. Kesling Gymnasium — Completed in Spring of 2016 and located in the Dworkin Student Services and Activities Complex in Westville. The 107,000 square foot facility is home to a gymnasium, athletic offices, locker rooms, and a conference center.
- Community Hospital Tennis Complex — Spring of 2016, the complex debuted and located in Dowling Park. It is home of the men and women's tennis team.
- Community Hospital Training Room & Physical Therapy Center — In April 2015, the center opened up. PNW's partnership with Community Hospital offers physical therapy and other injury-related services for students, student-athletes, and public members.
- Lalaeff & Fischer PNW Golf Training Center — April 27, 2018 was the opening of the training center. The 800-square foot golf center offers five types of synthetic surf, two television screens, and Ground Reaction Force (GRF) technology.
