= Harry C. Pohlman Field =

Stadium in Beloit, Wisconsin which hosts baseball

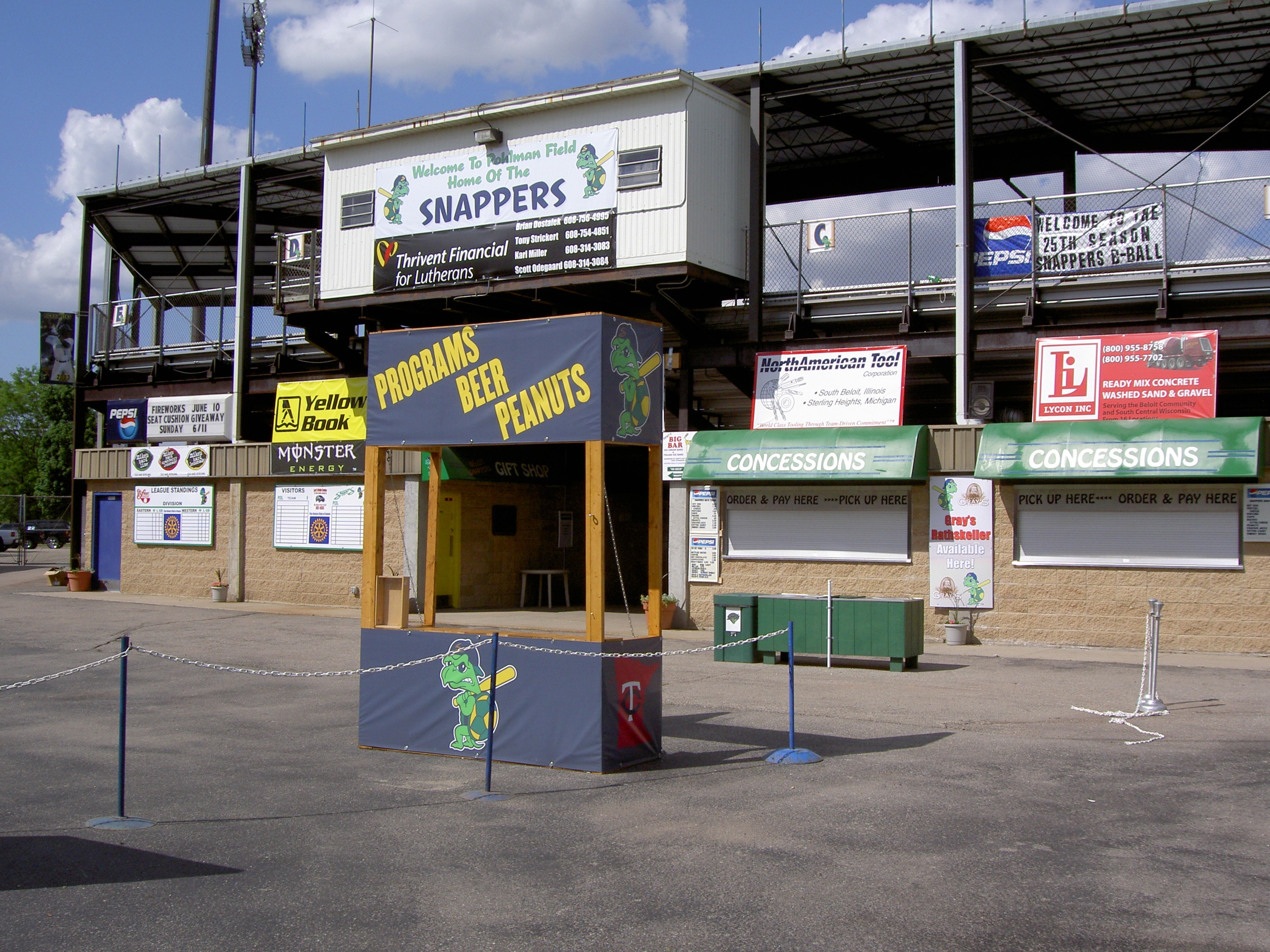
- Interactive map of Harry C. Pohlman Field
- Former names: Telfer Park (1982–1986)
- Location: 2301 Skyline Drive; Beloit, Wisconsin; United States
- Coordinates: 42.53539°N 89.007947°W
- Owner: City of Beloit
- Operator: Beloit Professional Baseball Association
- Capacity: 3,501
- Surface: Natural Grass (3.1 acres (1.3 ha))
- Field size: Left Field: 325 feet (99 m); Center Field: 380 feet (120 m); Right Field: 325 feet (99 m)
- Public transit: Beloit Transit

Construction
- Groundbreaking: 1981
- Opened: April 14, 1982
- Renovated: 1995

Tenants
- Beloit Snappers (MWL) 1982–2021; Beloit Memorial High School; Beloit American Legion

Harry C. Pohlman Field is a baseball field located in Beloit, Wisconsin, United States. The stadium was built in 1982 and holds 3,501 people. It was the home of the Beloit Snappers minor league baseball team of the Midwest League from its founding until July 18, 2021.

The Beloit Memorial High School and Beloit American Legion baseball teams both play their home games there as well.

== History ==
The ballpark's construction began in 1981 and was completed in April 1982. Its name was originally Telfer Park until the 1987 season, when it was named after Harry C. Pohlman, who was a long-time coach in the Beloit school system and in American Legion Baseball. He was also an original member of the Beloit Brewers board of directors. The stadium hosted the Midwest League All-Star Game in 1986.

=== Seating capacity ===
The seating capacity has been as follows:

- 3,100 (1982–1985)
- 3,800 (1986–1989)
- 3,100 (1990)
- 3,200 (1991–1996)
- 3,501 (1997–present)

=== Improvements ===
After the 2012 season, the city of Beloit appropriated $100,000 in order to completely redo the outfield. The outfield was raised and leveled with the infield and a new sprinkler system was installed. After the 2013 season, the concrete making up the concourses was repaired.

== New stadium ==
The Snappers started the 2021 season at Pohlman Field before officially moving to the new ABC Supply Stadium in August. The first game at ABC Supply Stadium was on August 3, 2021. It has not been confirmed whether or not the Beloit Memorial High School and Beloit American Legion will move into the new stadium but it is assumed that they will not. The Snappers final game at Pohlman Field was on July 18, 2021, a 5–4 win over the Quad Cities River Bandits
