= Northern League =

Northern League may refer to:

== Sport ==
Baseball

- Northern League (baseball, 1902–1971), a name used by several minor leagues that operated in the upper midwestern U.S. and Manitoba from 1902 to 1971
- Northern League (baseball, 1993–2010), an independent baseball league in the United States from 1993 to 2010
- Northern League (1936–1952), a collegiate summer baseball league that operated primarily in New York and Vermont
- Northern Association (1910), a minor league in Illinois and Iowa that operated for only one season
- Northern League (collegiate summer baseball), a collegiate summer baseball league named the Midwest Collegiate League from 2010 to 2022

Cricket

- Northern Premier Cricket League, a cricket league in England

Football

- Northern Football League, also known as Ebac Northern League, an association football league in North East England
- Northern Football League (Scotland) A now defunct Scottish football competition, in existence between 1891 and 1920
- Northern League (New Zealand), an association football league covering the northern part of the North Island, New Zealand
- Northern Premier League, also known as EvoStik League and previously UniBond League, an association football league covering the whole of the north of England
- Lega Nord (football), the first association football league in Italy

Ice hockey

- Northern League (ice hockey, 1966–1982), existed in the late 1970s and early 1980s in the United Kingdom
- Northern League (ice hockey, 2005–), a current minor ice hockey league in the United Kingdom

Motorcycle speedway

- Northern League (speedway), one of two British speedway leagues between 1929 and 1931

== Other meanings ==
- Northern League (Lega Nord), a political party in Italy
- Northern League (British neo-Nazi organisation), a eugenics group active in the United Kingdom in the mid-20th century

== See also ==
- League of the North (disambiguation)
