= Chicagoland Collegiate Athletic Conference =

Athletic conference in North America

- Association: NAIA
- Founded: 1949; 77 years ago
- Commissioner: Jeff Schimmelpfennig
- Sports fielded: 16; men's: 8; women's: 8
- No. of teams: 11
- Region: Midwestern United States
- Website: ccacsports.com

Locations
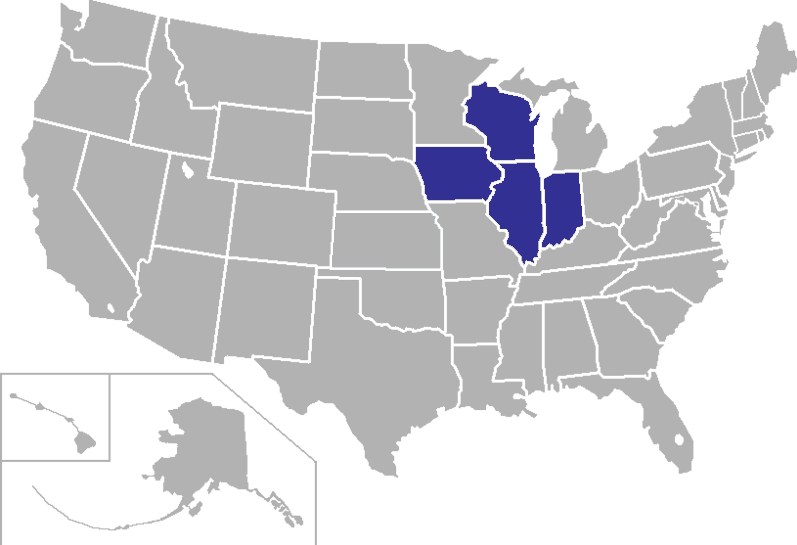

The Chicagoland Collegiate Athletic Conference (CCAC) is a college athletic conference affiliated with the National Association of Intercollegiate Athletics (NAIA). Its 11 members are located in the Midwestern United States. In many sports, the conference champion qualifies directly for national competition.

The CCAC sanctions play in eight men's and eight women's sports. Men's sports include soccer, cross country, basketball, track and field, tennis, baseball, golf, and volleyball; while women's sports include soccer, volleyball, cross country, track and field, basketball, tennis, golf, and softball.

In all sports, it sanctions regular season league play as well as a postseason tournament.

== Member schools ==
Chicagoland Collegiate Athletic Conference
Location of CCAC members: full member

=== Current members ===
Former Chicagoland Collegiate Athletic Conference until spring 2022

The CCAC currently has 11 full members, all but three are private schools:

Institution	Location	Founded	Affiliation	Enrollment	Nickname	Joined (Note: Represents the calendar year when fall sports competition begins.)
Calumet College of St. Joseph	Whiting, Indiana	1951	Catholic (C.PP.S.)	658	Crimson Wave	2001
Governors State University	University Park, Illinois	1969	Public	4,397	Jaguars	2016
Holy Cross College	Notre Dame, Indiana	1966	Catholic (C.S.C.)	661	Saints	2009
Indiana University Northwest (IU Northwest)	Gary, Indiana	1959	Public	3,041	Redhawks	2019
Indiana University South Bend (IU South Bend)	South Bend, Indiana	1966	Public	4,631	Titans	2003
Judson University	Elgin, Illinois	1963	American Baptist	960	Eagles	1996
Mount Mary University (Note: This institution is a women's college, therefore it does not field men's sports.)	Milwaukee, Wisconsin	1913	Catholic (SSND)	1,182	Blue Angels	2025
Olivet Nazarene University	Bourbonnais, Illinois	1907	Nazarene	3,339	Tigers	1993
University of St. Francis	Joliet, Illinois	1920	Catholic (Franciscans)	3,074	Fighting Saints	1973
Saint Xavier University	Chicago, Illinois	1846	Catholic (R.S.M.)	3,485	Cougars	1973
Viterbo University	La Crosse, Wisconsin	1890	Catholic (Franciscan)	2,094	V-Hawks	2024

=== Former members ===
The CCAC has 24 former full members, all but four are private schools:

Institution	Location	Founded	Affiliation	Nickname	Joined (Note: Represents the calendar year when fall sports competition begins.)	Left (Note: Represents the calendar year when spring sports competition ends.)	Current conference
Aurora University (Note: Formerly known as Aurora College until 1985.)	Aurora, Illinois	1893	Nonsectarian	Spartans	1954	1970^{?}	Northern (NACC) (Note: Currently an NCAA Division III athletic conference.)
Barat College	Lake Forest, Illinois	1858	Catholic	Bulldogs	1998^{?}	2001	N/A (Note: Barat was merged with DePaul University in 2001; which was later closed in 2005.)
Cardinal Stritch University	Milwaukee, Wisconsin	1931	Catholic (S.S.F.A.)	Wolves	1997	2023	Closed in 2023
University of Chicago (Note: Didn't participate for the basketball charter member side before 1973.)	Chicago, Illinois	1890	Nonsectarian	Maroons	1949	?	University (UAA)
Chicago State University	Chicago, Illinois	1867	Public (TMCF)	Cougars	1965^{?}	1981^{?}	Northeast (NEC) (Note: Currently an NCAA Division I athletic conference.)
Dominican University (Note: Formerly known as Rosary College until 1997.)	River Forest, Illinois	1901	Catholic (Dominican Order)	Stars	1981^{?}	1999^{?}	Northern (NACC)
Eureka College	Eureka, Illinois	1855	Disciples of Christ	Red Devils	?	1996^{?}	St. Louis (SLIAC)
George Williams College	Williams Bay, Wisconsin	1890	Christian	Indians	1976	1978^{?} (or 1980^{?})	N/A (Note: George Williams was merged into Aurora University in 2000.)
Illinois Institute of Technology	Chicago, Illinois	1890	Nonsectarian	Scarlet Hawks	1949; 1993^{?}	1981^{?} 2013	Northern (NACC)
University of Illinois–Chicago	Chicago, Illinois	1858	Public	Flames	1949	1978^{?} (or 1980^{?})	Missouri Valley (MVC)
Indiana Institute of Technology	Fort Wayne, Indiana	1930	Nonsectarian	Warriors	1978	1988	Wolverine–Hoosier (WHAC)
Kendall College	Chicago, Illinois	1934	Nonsectarian	Vikings	1997	2004^{?}	N/A (Note: Kendall was purchased in 2008 by Laureate International Universities, and later transferred to National Louis University in 2018.)
Lewis University (Note: Formerly known as Lewis College until 1973.)	Romeoville, Illinois	1932	Catholic (C.F.C.)	Flyers	1954	1980	Great Lakes Valley (GLVC) (Note: Currently an NCAA Division II athletic conference.)
Lincoln College	Lincoln, Illinois	1865	Nonsectarian	Lynx	2020	2022	Closed in 2022
Mundelein College (Note: This institution was a women's college, therefore it did not compete in men's sports.)	Chicago, Illinois	1930	Catholic (B.V.M.)	Lakers	1982^{?}	1991^{?} (or 1993^{?})	N/A (Note: Mundelein was merged with Loyola University Chicago in 1991.)
National Louis University	Chicago, Illinois	1886	Nonsectarian	Eagles (Note: National Louis's nickname was Lakers before 1990.)	1982	1994 (or 1993^{?})	N/A (Note: National-Louis dropped its athletic program during the 1990s.)
North Park University	Chicago, Illinois	1891	Evangelical; Covenant	Vikings	1959	1962^{?}	Illinois–Wisconsin (CCIW)
Northeastern Illinois University	Chicago, Illinois	1867	Public	Golden Eagles	1949	1980 (or 1989^{?})	N/A (Note: Northeastern Illinois dropped its athletic program after the 1997–98 school year.)
Purdue University–Northwest (Note: Purdue–Northwest was formed in 2016 by the combining of Purdue–Calumet (located in Hammond, Indiana and competing as the Peregrines) and Purdue–North Central (located in Westville, Indiana and competing as the Panthers).: Purdue–North Central joined the CCAC from before 2004–05 to 2015–16; while Purdue–Calumet joined from 1973–74 to 1974–75, and from 1993–94 to 2015–16.)	Hammond & Westville, Indiana	1973	Public	Pride (Note: Purdue–Northwest athletics are currently known as the Lions.)	1973	2017	Great Lakes (GLIAC)
Robert Morris University	Chicago, Illinois	1913	Nonsectarian	Eagles	1995 (or 1996^{?})	2020	N/A (Note: Robert Morris (Ill.) merged into Roosevelt University after the 2019–20 school year.)
Roosevelt University	Chicago, Illinois	1945	Nonsectarian	Lakers	2010	2024 (Note: Roosevelt left the CCAC after the 2023–24 school year. Initially the school joined the Great Lakes Intercollegiate Athletic Conference (GLIAC) as a provisional member for most sports as a transitional NCAA Division II member school during 2023–24; but was fulfilling its commitments to the final year of competition in the CCAC and in the NAIA.)	Great Lakes (GLIAC)
St. Ambrose University	Davenport, Iowa	1882	Catholic (Diocese of Davenport)	Fighting Bees	2015	2026	Heart of America (HAAC)
Trinity Christian College	Palos Heights, Illinois	1959	Reformed	Trolls	1987	2026	Closed in 2026
Trinity International University	Deerfield, Illinois	1897	Evangelical; Christian	Trojans	1996	2023	N/A (Note: Trinity International closed their residential campus after 2022–2023 school year and now it only have online modalities.)

=== Former affiliate members ===
The CCAC currently had one former affiliate member, which is also a private school:

Institution	Location	Founded	Affiliation	Nickname	Joined (Note: Represents the calendar year when fall sports competition begins.)	Left (Note: Represents the calendar year when spring sports competition ends.)	CCAC sport(s)	Current primary conference	Conference in former CCAC sport(s)
Viterbo University	La Crosse, Wisconsin	1890	Catholic (Franciscan)	V-Hawks	2018	2024 (Note: Viterbo became a full member of the CCAC in the 2024–25 school year.)	Men's volleyball	Chicagoland (CCAC)	
Viterbo University	La Crosse, Wisconsin	1890	Catholic (Franciscan)	V-Hawks	2018	2024	Men's soccer	Chicagoland (CCAC)	
Viterbo University	La Crosse, Wisconsin	1890	Catholic (Franciscan)	V-Hawks	2018	2024	Women's soccer	Chicagoland (CCAC)	
