= Rockford Expos =

- 1988–1999; Rockford, Illinois

Minor league affiliations
- Class: Class A (1988–1999)
- League: Midwest League (1988–1999)

Major league affiliations
- Team: Montreal Expos (1988–1992); Kansas City Royals (1993–1994); Chicago Cubs (1995–1998); Cincinnati Reds (1999)

Minor league titles
- League titles: None
- Conference titles (1): 1994
- Division titles (5): 1988; 1989; 1993; 1998; 1999
- Wild card berths (8): 1988; 1989; 1993; 1994; 1995; 1996; 1998; 1999

Team data
- Name: Rockford Expos (1988–1992); Rockford Royals (1993–1994); Rockford Cubbies (1995–1998); Rockford Reds (1999)
- Ballpark: Marinelli Field (1988–1999)

The Rockford Expos was the initial name of a Class A minor league baseball franchise based in Rockford, Illinois that operated from 1988 to 1999. Rockford's first franchise in the Midwest League, it was affiliated with the Montreal Expos (1988–1992), Kansas City Royals (1993–1994), Chicago Cubs (1995–1998) and Cincinnati Reds (1999), and played home games at Marinelli Field.

After minor league baseball first began in Rockford in 1871, Rockford hosted various teams in different minor leagues. The Rockford Expos were immediately preceded in Rockford by the Rockford Rox (1947–1949) of the Central Association. In 2000, the Rockford franchise moved to Dayton, Ohio, where the franchise played in the Midwest League and continues play today as the Dayton Dragons.

== History ==
Minor league baseball began in Rockford, Illinois with the 1871 Rockford Forest Citys, who were one of the earliest professional teams. In 1947, the Rockford Rox returned minor league baseball to Rockford after a 24–year absence.

34 years after the Rockford Rox last played, Rockford became home to the Rockford Expos in 1988. The Midwest League's expansion occurred in 1988 when the Rockford Expos and South Bend White Sox joined the Class A level, 14–team league.

The 1988 Expos finished third in attendance (158,674), were second in the northern division in the first half (39–29) and won the division in the second half (45–27). The Expos lost in the postseason to the Kenosha Twins.

The 1989 Rockford Expos finished with a record 34–32 in the first half, winning the second half with a 40–27 record. Managed by Mike Quade, the 1989 Expos drew 139,338 fans (6th in the MWL). In the playoffs, the Expos lost to the South Bend White Sox, 2 games to none.

In 1990, the Rockford Expos finished the first half with a 34–34 record and were last with a 22–46 second half. The team drew 140,864 fans (5th in the 14–team league).

The 1991 Rockford Expos finished second in both halves with a 76–61 overall record. Attendance was 66,524 (12th in the league) as Pat Kelly and Rob Leary managed the team.

The 1992 Expos finished with a record of 66–70, with a home attendance total of 50,900 in 1992 (9th place).

After the 1992 season, the Rockford franchise agreed to eventually become an affiliate of the Chicago Cubs. An existing agreement with the Peoria Chiefs prevented the Cubs from leaving as a Peoria affiliate until 1994. Rockford became a Kansas City Royals affiliate for the next two seasons.

The newly named Rockford Royals finished with a 78–54 overall record in 1993, playing under Manager Mike Jirschele. The Rockford Royals won the first–half northern division title with a 43–22 record. The Royals finished the regular season 1.0 games behind the Clinton Giants for the top Midwest League record, with attendance of 68,206. The Royals lost in the 1st round in the playoffs, two-games to zero to the South Bend White Sox.

Rockford was dominant in 1994, capturing a first-place finish in both halves (44–25 and 45–25), while drawing 70,527 fans. The Rockford Royals won their opening playoff series, beating the West Michigan Whitecaps two–games to zero. Rockford then lost 3 games to 1 to the Cedar Rapids Kernels in the 1994 Midwest League finals.

As planned, Rockford became the Rockford Cubbies in 1995.

The Rockford Cubbies finished 75–65 overall in 1995 under manager Steve Roadcap. Rockford lost in the first round of the playoffs to the Beloit Brewers two–games to zero. The Cubbies drew 110,052 fans, 10th in the league.

In 1996 the Cubbies finished 70-65 overall and drew fans 102,479 (11th). They defeated the Beloit Brewers two-games to one in the playoffs, but fell to the West Michigan WhiteCaps two–games to zero in the semifinals.

In September 1996, the Chicago Cubs announced an agreement in principle to develop a new Rockford Cubbies stadium in Cherry Valley. In April 1997, local officials met to discuss ways to revive the proposal.

The 1997 Rockford Cubbies finished 66–66 overall under manager Rubén Amaro and missed the playoffs. The team drew 86,716 (11th).

In 1997, Chicago-area investor Sherrie Myers planned to buy the Rockford franchise and move it to Dayton, Ohio, but the purchase was not completed.

The last year for the Rockford Cubbies was 1998. Rockford finished last in the first half in the central division at 32–39. The Cubbies then won the second half at 39–29. In the playoffs, the Rockford Cubbies beat the Wisconsin Timber Rattlers (2–1) and the Fort Wayne Wizards (2–0) to advance to the Midwest League Finals. The Cubbies lost 3 games to 1 in the finals against the West Michigan Whitecaps. They drew 75,600 (11th).

In February 1999, Mandalay Sports Entertainment acquired the franchise and announced plans to relocate it to Dayton after the season. It changed its affiliation to the Cincinnati Reds and adopted the Rockford Reds name for its final Rockford season. The Rockford Reds finished 45–24 in the first half to capture the Central Division first half crown. The Reds finished 31–39 in the second half of the season for an overall record of 76–63. The Rockford Reds played the franchise's final games, losing to the Wisconsin Timber Rattlers two games to zero in the first round of the postseason.

After the 1999 season, the franchise relocated to Dayton and became the Dayton Dragons, who remain members of the Midwest League.

== The ballparks ==
In 1947–1949, the Rockford Rox played at Blackhawk Park. The ballpark was located within the park, located at 101 15th Avenue. Built in 1988, the Rockford Midwest League teams played at Marinelli Field. Still in use today, Marinelli Field is located at 101 15th Avenue, Rockford, Illinois.

== Year–by–year records ==
Year	Record	Finish	Manager	Playoffs
1988	84–56	2nd	Alan Bannister	Lost in 1st Round
1989	74–59	4th	Mike Quade	Lost in 1st Round
1990	56–80	12th	Mike Quade	Did not qualify
1991	76–61	2nd	Pat Kelly (27–21) / Rich Dubee (1–1) / Rob Leary (48–39)	Did not qualify
1992	66–70	7th	Rob Leary	Did not qualify
1993	78–64	2nd	Mike Jirschele	Lost in 1st Round
1994	89–50	1st	John Mizerock	Lost in League Finals
1995	75–65	5th	Steve Roadcap	Lost in 1st Round
1996	70–65	5th	Steve Roadcap	Lost in 2nd Round
1997	66–66	9th	Rubén Amaro	Did not qualify
1998	71–68	7th	Rubén Amaro	Lost League Finals
1999	76–63	4th	Mike Rojas	Lost in 1st Round

== Notable alumni ==
- Miguel Batista (1990-1991)
- Greg Colbrunn (1988)
- Johnny Damon (1993) 2x MLB All-Star
- Delino DeShields (1988)
- Adam Dunn (1999) 2x MLB All-Star; Cincinnati Reds Hall of Fame
- Kyle Farnsworth (1996)
- Sal Fasano (1994)
- Kevin Foster (1989)
- Geremi Gonzalez (1995)
- Willie Greene (1990)
- Mark Grudzielanek (1992) MLB All-Star
- Chris Haney (1990)
- Eric Hinske (1998) 2002 AL Rookie of the Year
- Austin Kearns (1999)
- Tim Laker (1989–1990)
- Kyle Lohse (1998)
- Ramon Martinez (1994)
- Corky Miller (1999)
- Jose Molina (1996)
- Rodney Myers (1993)
- Chris Nabholz (1989)
- Will Ohman (1998)
- Carlos Perez (1992) MLB All-Star
- Al Reyes (1991)
- Mel Rojas (1988)
- Kirk Rueter (1992) San Francisco Giants Wall of Fame
- Glendon Rusch (1993–1994)
- Matt Stairs (1989)
- Mike Sweeney (1994) 5x MLB All-Star; Kansas City Royals Hall of Fame
- Gabe White (1992)
- Mark Wohlers (1999) MLB All-Star

== See also ==
- Rockford Expos players
- Rockford Forest Citys (minor league) players
- Rockford Cubbies players
- Rockford Royals players
- Rockford Reds players
- Rockford Rox players
