= Western League =

Western League may refer to:

== Baseball ==
- Western League (1885–1900), the predecessor to the modern American League of 1901 in Major League Baseball
- Western League (1900–1958), a former U.S. minor baseball league loop. Its region was later represented by the more dominant Pacific Coast League in Class AAA ("Triple A")
- Western League (1939–1941), a Class D, low minor circuit in the U.S. that existed briefly before World War II
- Western Baseball League, a former independent minor league in the U.S. which ceased operation in 2002
- Western League (Japanese baseball), one of two professional minor leagues in Japan
- Liga Occidental de Béisbol Profesional, a former Venezuelan professional league known in English as the Western League

== Other sports ==
- Western Football League, a semi-professional United Kingdom football league in the English National League System
- West of England Premier League, an English cricket league formerly known as the Western League

== See also ==
- Western Association, a name used by several unrelated baseball leagues
- Western States Football League, a defunct American junior college football league
