= Rockford Aviators =

- Logo

Information
- League: Frontier League (2002-2009, 2011–2015); Northern League (2010)
- Location: Loves Park, Illinois
- Ballpark: Marinelli Field (2002-2005); Aviators Stadium (2006-2015)
- Founded: 2002
- Folded: 2015
- League championships: 1 (2004)
- Division championships: 2 (2004, 2006)
- Former name: Rockford RiverHawks (2002–2012)
- Colors: Navy, orange, Columbia blue, white

The Rockford Aviators were a professional baseball team based in Loves Park, Illinois, that played in the independent Frontier League from 2013 through 2015. Their home field was Aviators Stadium.

== History ==
Rockford joined the Frontier League in 2002, replacing Springfield in the league's membership. In 2011, after the previous Rockford RiverHawks organization left the North American League, a new ownership group acquired the ballpark lease and team marks and returned a Rockford RiverHawks team to the Frontier League. The Frontier League recorded the club's 2013 rebranding as the Aviators.

The highlight for Rockford was the stellar 2004 Frontier League season with manager Bob Koopmann, winning the West division with a 59-37 (.615) record, advancing to the playoffs where they edged the Windy City Thunderbolts 3-2 in the best of five series to advance to the league championship series. Rockford would then sweep the Evansville Otters 3-0 to win the Frontier League title. The team was led by pitcher Josh Tomsu (10-3, 2.64 ERA), closer Josh Latimer (3-3, 15 saves, 2.47 ERA), Aaron McEachran (.332 BA, 11 HR, 62 RBI), Rico Santana (.284 BA, 5 HR, 65 RBI, 27 SB), Doug Schutt (.286 BA, 3 HR, 32 RBI, 39 SB) and Frontier League MVP Rich Austin (.359 BA, 15 HR, 77 RBI, 22 SB).

The franchise faced ballpark financial difficulties beginning in 2012, when the stadium entered foreclosure proceedings. The ballpark was offered for sale in 2015. The Aviators did not return to the Frontier League for the 2016 season.

Rockford is represented in the Frontier League Hall of Fame by outfielders Stephen Holdren, Jason James and Richard Austin.

== Seasons ==
Rockford RiverHawks (Frontier League)
Year	W-L	PCT	Place	Postseason
2002	45-39	.536	2nd in FL West	
2003	48-42	.533	2nd in FL West	
2004	59-37	.615	1st in FL West	Division Series: Defeated the Gateway Grizzlies 3-2; Championship Series: Defeated the Evansville Otters 3-0; Frontier League Champions
2005	51-45	.531	2nd in FL West	League Division Series: Lost vs. Kalamazoo Kings 3-1
2006	49-47	.510	1st in FL West	League Division Series: Lost vs. Evansville Otters 3-2
2007	52-43	.547	2nd in FL Central	League Division Series: Lost vs. Windy City Thunderbolts 3-0
2008	48-48	.500	4th in FL West	
2009	44-50	.468	4th in FL West	
Rockford RiverHawks (Northern League)
Year	W-L	PCT	Place	Postseason
2010	47-52	.475	5th in NL	
Rockford RiverHawks (Frontier League)
Year	W-L	PCT	Place	Postseason
2011	37-59	.385	6th in FL East	
2012	41-55	.427	5th in FL West	
Rockford Aviators (Frontier League)
Year	W-L	PCT	Place	Postseason
2013	36-60	.375	6th in FL West	
2014	40-56	.417	5th in FL West	
2015	49-47	.538	3rd in FL West	Quarterfinals: Lost vs. Traverse City Beach Bums 1-0
				2 Division Titles, 5 Playoff Appearances, 1 Championship

== Notable alumni ==
- Drew Rucinski (2011–13)
- José Martínez (2014)
- Josh Smoker (2014)
- Nick Anderson (2012–13)
