= Goodland =

Goodland, Goodlands, or, Good Land, may refer to:

== Places ==
=== United States ===
- Goodland, Florida
- Goodland, Indiana
- Goodland, Kansas
- Goodland Township, Michigan
  - Goodland, Michigan, an unincorporated community
- Goodland, Minnesota
- Goodland Township, Itasca County, Minnesota
- Goodland, Iron County, Missouri
- Goodland, Knox County, Missouri
- Goodland, Oklahoma
- Goodland, Bailey County, Texas
- Goodland, Robertson County, Texas

=== Elsewhere ===
- Goodland, Barbados
- Goodlands, Canada, the Canadian side of the Carbury–Goodlands Border Crossing
- Goodland, County Antrim, a townland in County Antrim, Northern Ireland
- Goodlands, Mauritius
- Goodlands, Manitoba

== People ==
- Goodland (surname)

== Other uses ==
- Benton County Wind Farm, Indiana, U.S., also known as Goodland I
- Goodland Academy, Choctaw County, Oklahoma, U.S.; a boarding school
- Goodland Field, now Nienhaus Field, in Appleton, Wisconsin, U.S.; a sports field
- Goodland Municipal Airport, Goodland, Kansas, U.S.

== See also ==
- The Good Earth (disambiguation)
- Good (disambiguation)
- Land (disambiguation)
- Terrebonne (disambiguation) (French: Good Land)
- Bonne Terre (disambiguation) (French: Good Land)
