= Midwest League Manager of the Year Award =

- Sport: Baseball
- League: Midwest League
- Awarded for: Best regular-season manager in the Midwest League
- Country: United States
- Presented by: Texas League

History
- First award: Walt DeFreitas (1947)
- Most wins: Mark Haley (3)
- Most recent: Jair Fernandez (2026)

The Midwest League Manager of the Year Award is an annual award given to the best manager in Minor League Baseball's Midwest League based on their regular-season performance as voted on by league managers. Broadcasters, Minor League Baseball executives, and members of the media have previously voted as well. The award was created in the league's inaugural 1947 season. The circuit was known as the Illinois State League from 1947 to 1948 and as the Mississippi–Ohio Valley League from 1949 to 1955 before becoming the Midwest League in 1956. After the cancellation of the 2020 season, the league was known as the High-A Central in 2021 before reverting to the Midwest League name in 2022.

The only manager to win the award on three occasions is Mark Haley, who won in 2005, 2008, and 2013. Three others have each won twice: Bruce Fields, Gomer Hodge, and Buddy Kerr.

Seven managers from the and Wisconsin Timber Rattlers have been selected for the Manager of the Year Award, more than any other team in the league, followed by the Cedar Rapids Kernels and West Michigan Whitecaps (6); the Kane County Cougars and Waterloo Indians (5); the Great Lakes Loons, Quad Cities River Bandits, and South Bend Cubs (4); the Burlington Bees and Danville Warriors (3); the Clinton Giants, Kenosha Twins, Lansing Lugnuts, Michigan Battle Cats, Peoria Chiefs, and Wisconsin Rapids Twins (2); and the Belleville Stags, Beloit Sky Carp, Bowling Green Hot Rods, Decatur Commodores, Fort Wayne TinCaps, Lafayette Red Sox, Madison Muskies, Michigan City White Caps, Quincy Giants, Rockford Royals, Springfield Cardinals, and Wausau Timbers (1).

Seven managers from the Detroit Tigers Major League Baseball (MLB) organization have won the award, more than any other, followed by the Chicago White Sox, Milwaukee Brewers, Minnesota Twins, and Oakland Athletics organizations (5); the Boston Red Sox, Chicago Cubs, Los Angeles Dodgers, and San Francisco Giants organizations (4); the Arizona Diamondbacks, Cleveland Guardians, Kansas City Royals, and St. Louis Cardinals organizations (3); the Baltimore Orioles, Cincinnati Reds, Los Angeles Angels, Houston Astros, Miami Marlins, and Toronto Blue Jays organizations (2); and the San Diego Padres and Tampa Bay Rays organizations (1). Two award winners played for teams that operated as cooperatives of several MLB organizations.

== Winners ==
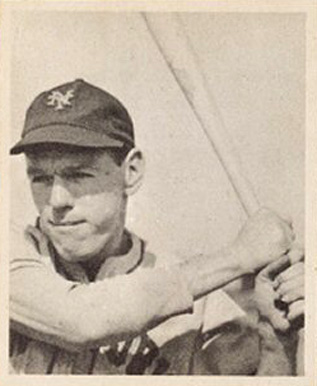
Buddy Kerr won the Manager of the Year Award in 1958 and 1961.

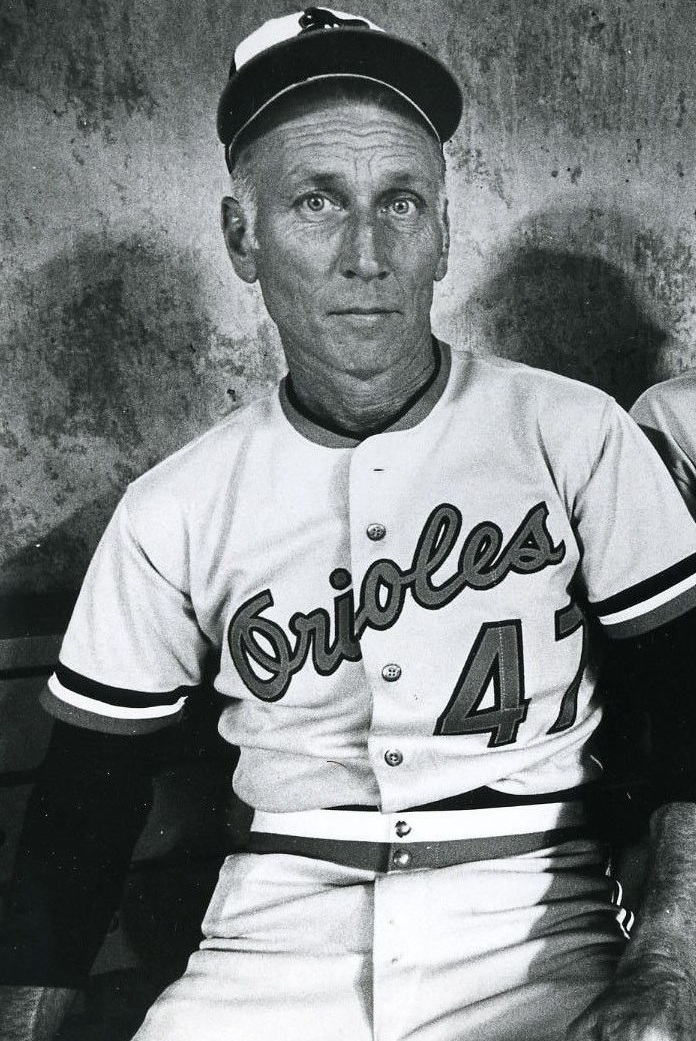
Cal Ripken Sr. was the 1962 Manager of the Year.

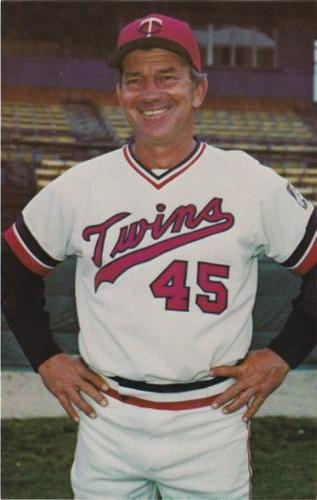
John Goryl, the 1974 winner, was the recipient of the 2012 Mike Coolbaugh Award.

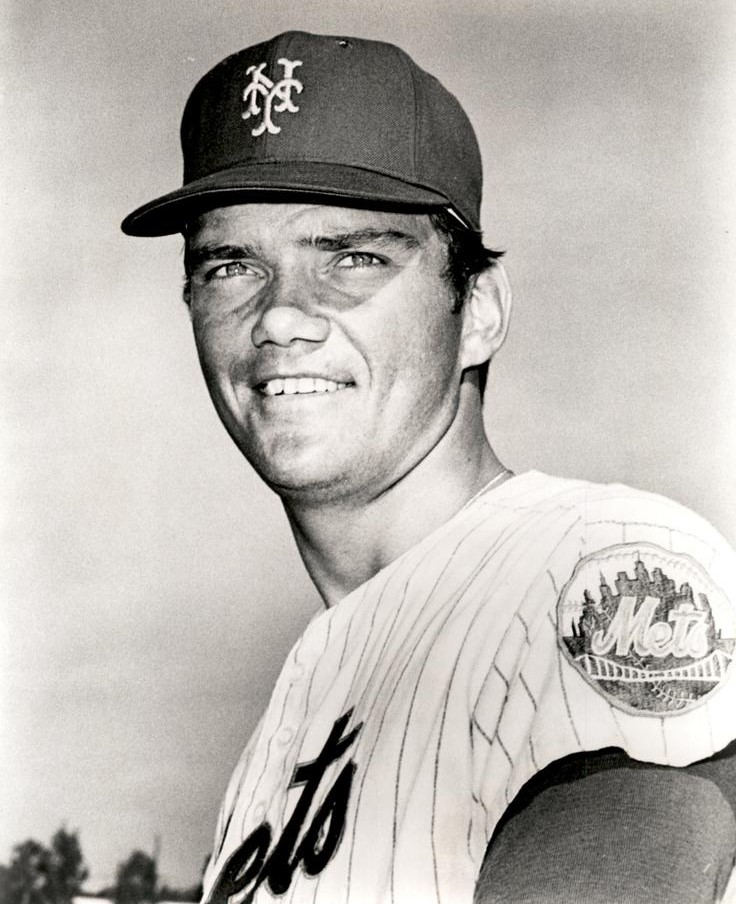
Duffy Dyer was the 1985 Manager of the Year.

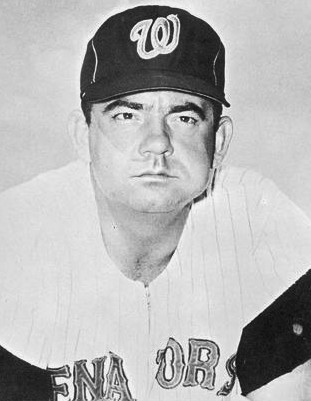
Don Leppert won the Manager of the Year Award in 1987.

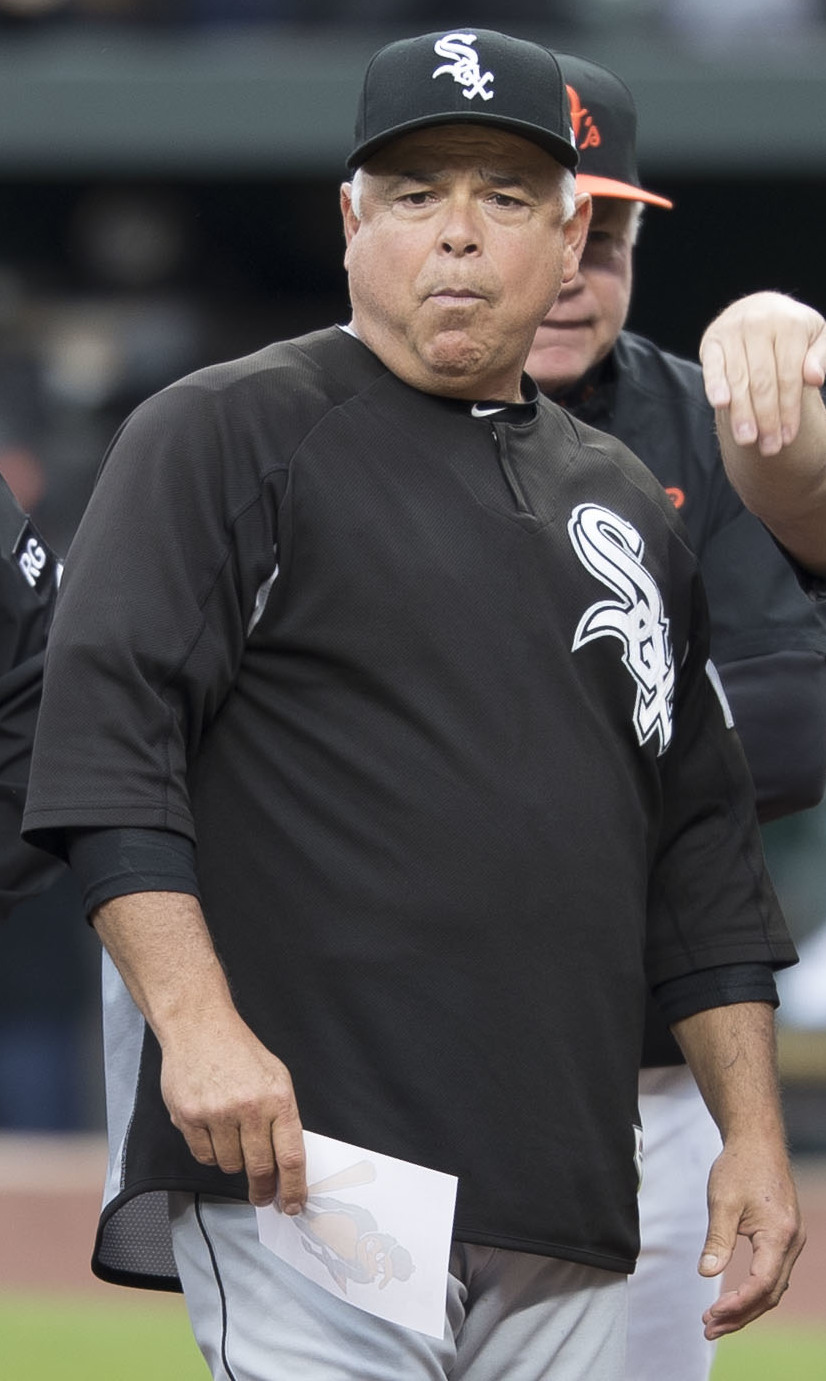
Rick Renteria was the 1999 Manager of the Year.

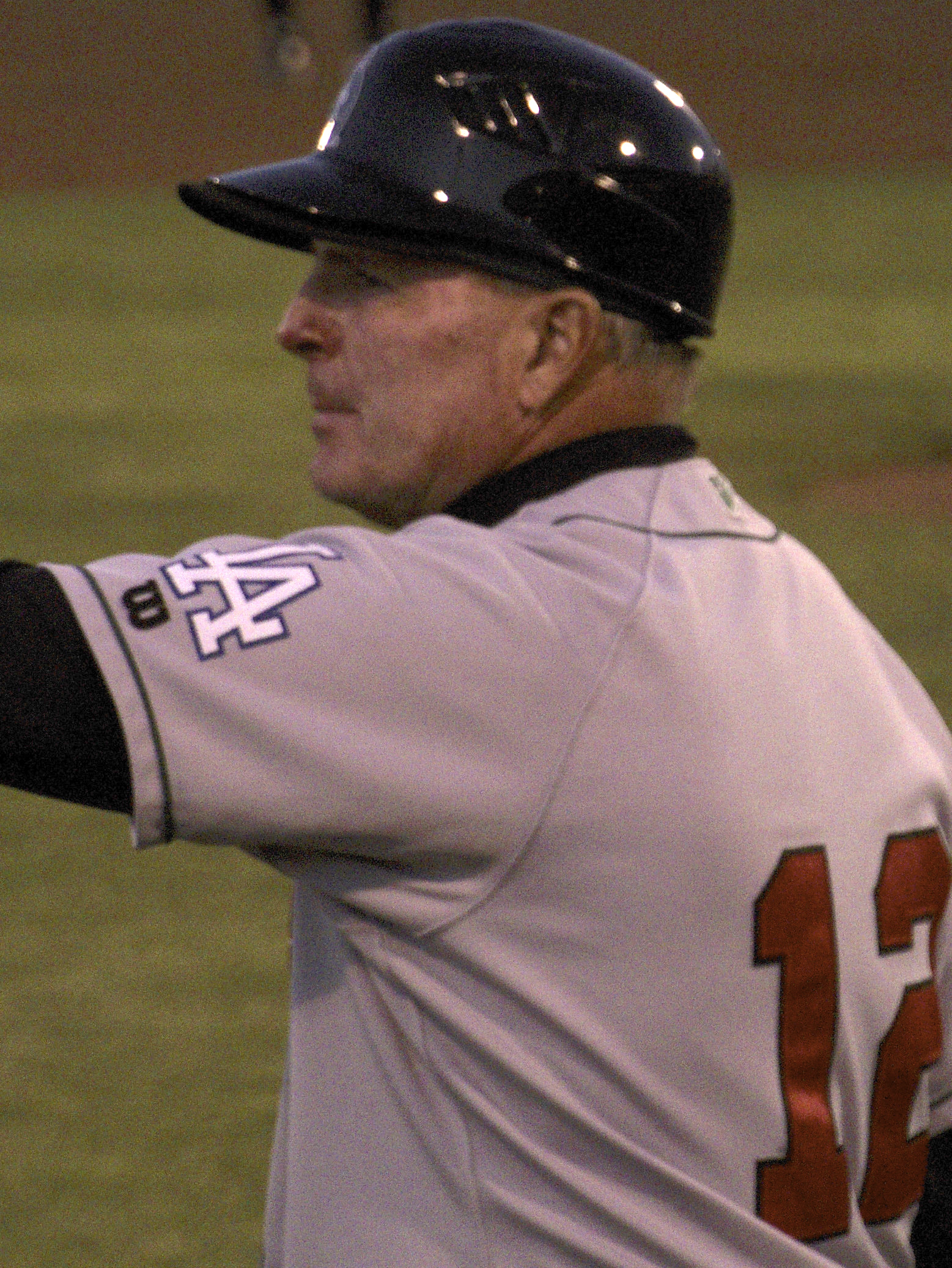
John Shoemaker was the Manager of the Year in 2019.

Key
League	The team's final position in the league standings
Division	The team's final position in the divisional standings
Record	The team's wins and losses during the regular season
(#)	Number of wins by managers who won the award multiple times
^	Indicates multiple award winners in the same year
*	Indicates league champions

Winners
Year	Winner	Team	Organization	League	Division	Record	Ref(s).
1947	Walt DeFreitas	Belleville Stags*	St. Louis Browns	1st	—	75–37	
1948	None selected						
1949	None selected						
1950	None selected						
1951	None selected						
1952	None selected						
1953	None selected						
1954	None selected						
1955	None selected						
1956	Len Okrie	Lafayette Red Sox	Boston Red Sox	2nd	—	69–56	
1957	None selected						
1958	Buddy Kerr (1)	Michigan City White Caps	San Francisco Giants	2nd	—	69–55	
1959	Stubby Overmire	Decatur Commodores	Detroit Tigers	3rd (tie)	—	63–61	
1960	Matt Sczesny	Waterloo Hawks*	Boston Red Sox	1st	—	81–43	
1961	Buddy Kerr (2)	Quincy Giants*	San Francisco Giants	4th	—	67–59	
1962	Cal Ripken Sr.	Appleton Foxes	Baltimore Orioles	7th	—	61–63	
1963	Don Bacon	Clinton C-Sox*	Chicago White Sox	1st	—	83–41	
1964	None selected						
1965	Gus Niarhos	Burlington Bees*	Kansas City Athletics	1st	—	82–40	
1966	Al Ronning	Burlington Bees	Kansas City Athletics	3rd	—	77–48	
1967	Alex Cosmidis	Appleton Foxes*	Chicago White Sox	1st	—	71–46	
1968	Jack Krol	Cedar Rapids Cardinals	St. Louis Cardinals	3rd	—	63–53	
1969	Tom Saffell	Appleton Foxes*	Chicago White Sox	1st	—	84–41	
1970	Frank Calo	Danville Warriors	Co-op (Note: Danville operated as a cooperative of 15 Major League Baseball teams in 1970.)	4th	—	64–59	
1971	Joe Sparks	Appleton Foxes	Chicago White Sox	1st	1st	79–44	
1972	Joe Nossek	Danville Warriors*	Milwaukee Brewers	2nd	1st	73–52	
1973	Bernie Smith	Danville Warriors	Milwaukee Brewers	3rd	1st	66–57	
1974	Johnny Goryl	Wisconsin Rapids Twins	Minnesota Twins	1st	1st	80–48	
1975	John Sullivan	Waterloo Royals*	Kansas City Royals	1st	1st	93–35	
1976	Salty Parker	Cedar Rapids Giants	San Francisco Giants	2nd	1st	78–53	
1977	Denis Menke	Burlington Bees*	Milwaukee Brewers	5th	4th	71–68	
1978^	Gordon Lund	Appleton Foxes*	Chicago White Sox	1st	1st	97–40	
1978^	Woody Smith	Waterloo Indians	Cleveland Indians	2nd	2nd	91–46	
1979	Tom Robson	Wausau Timbers	Co-op (Note: Wasau operated as a cooperative of seven Major League Baseball teams in 1979, with most players coming from the Texas Rangers.)	4th	2nd	69–61	
1980	Rick Stelmaszek	Wisconsin Rapids Twins	Minnesota Twins	3rd	3rd	77–64	
1981	Gomer Hodge (1)	Waterloo Indians	Cleveland Indians	2nd	2nd	81–55	
1982	George Enright	Quad Cities Cubs	Chicago Cubs	4th	1st	79–60	
1983	Gomer Hodge (2)	Waterloo Indians	Cleveland Indians	3rd (tie)	1st (tie)	76–64	
1984	Tom Gamboa	Beloit Brewers	Milwaukee Brewers	2nd	1st	86–53	
1985	Duffy Dyer	Kenosha Twins*	Minnesota Twins	4th	1st	76–60	
1986	Gaylen Pitts	Springfield Cardinals	St. Louis Cardinals	1st	1st	87–53	
1987	Don Leppert	Kenosha Twins*	Minnesota Twins	2nd	1st	82–58	
1988	Marc Bombard	Cedar Rapids Reds*	Cincinnati Reds	1st	1st	87–53	
1989	Dave Miley	Cedar Rapids Reds	Cincinnati Reds	2nd	1st	80–57	
1990	Don Long	Quad Cities Angels*	California Angels	2nd	2nd	81–59	
1991	Gary Jones	Madison Muskies	Oakland Athletics	1st	1st	77–61	
1992	Tom Poquette	Appleton Foxes	Kansas City Royals	6th	3rd	70–62	
1993	Jack Mull	Clinton Giants	San Francisco Giants	1st	1st	80–54	
1994	John Mizerock	Rockford Royals	Kansas City Royals	1st	1st	89–50	
1995	DeMarlo Hale	Michigan Battle Cats	Boston Red Sox	4th	1st	75–63	
1996	Roy Silver	Peoria Chiefs	St. Louis Cardinals	1st	1st	79–57	
1997	Bruce Fields (1)	West Michigan Whitecaps	Detroit Tigers	1st	1st	92–39	
1998	Billy Gardner Jr.	Michigan Battle Cats	Boston Red Sox	2nd (tie)	2nd (tie)	79–61	
1999	Rick Renteria	Kane County Cougars	Florida Marlins	1st	1st	78–59	
2000	Bruce Fields (2)	West Michigan Whitecaps	Detroit Tigers	1st	1st	88–52	
2001	Russ Morman	Kane County Cougars*	Florida Marlins	1st	1st	88–50	
2002	Todd Claus	Cedar Rapids Kernels	Anaheim Angels	3rd	2nd	81–58	
2003	Webster Garrison	Kane County Cougars	Oakland Athletics	1st	1st	80–59	
2004	Dave Joppie	Kane County Cougars	Oakland Athletics	1st	1st	83–56	
2005	Mark Haley (1)	South Bend Silver Hawks*	Arizona Diamondbacks	1st	1st	84–56	
2006	Matt Walbeck	West Michigan Whitecaps*	Detroit Tigers	1st	1st	89–48	
2007	Tom Brookens	West Michigan Whitecaps*	Detroit Tigers	1st	1st	83–57	
2008	Mark Haley (2)	South Bend Silver Hawks	Arizona Diamondbacks	2nd	2nd	76–63	
2009^	Doug Dascenzo	Fort Wayne TinCaps*	San Diego Padres	1st	1st	94–46	
2009^	Marty Pevey	Peoria Chiefs	Chicago Cubs	2nd	1st	81–57	
2010	Juan Bustabad	Great Lakes Loons	Los Angeles Dodgers	1st	1st	90–49	
2011	Mike Redmond	Lansing Lugnuts	Toronto Blue Jays	3rd	2nd	77–60	
2012	John Tamargo	Lansing Lugnuts	Toronto Blue Jays	1st	1st	82–55	
2013	Mark Haley (3)	South Bend Silver Hawks	Arizona Diamondbacks	4th	2nd	81–58	
2014	Mark Johnson	Kane County Cougars*	Chicago Cubs	1st	1st	91–49	
2015	Josh Bonifay	Quad Cities River Bandits	Houston Astros	1st	1st	88–50	
2016	Jimmy Gonzalez	South Bend Cubs	Chicago Cubs	2nd (tie)	1st (tie)	84–55	
2017	Mike Rabelo	West Michigan Whitecaps	Detroit Tigers	1st	1st	91–45	
2018	Craig Albernaz	Bowling Green Hot Rods*	Tampa Bay Rays	1st	1st	90–49	
2019	John Shoemaker	Great Lakes Loons	Los Angeles Dodgers	1st	1st	81–55	
2020	None selected (season cancelled due to COVID-19 pandemic)						
2021	Chris Widger	Quad Cities River Bandits*	Houston Astros	1st	1st	77–41	
2022	Austin Chubb	Great Lakes Loons	Los Angeles Dodgers	2nd	2nd	76–55	
2023	Brian Dinkelman	Cedar Rapids Kernels*	Minnesota Twins	1st	1st	82–50	
2024	Victor Estevez	Wisconsin Timber Rattlers	Milwaukee Brewers	1st	2nd	77–54	
2025	Tony Cappuccilli	West Michigan Whitecaps*	Detroit Tigers	1st	1st	92–39	
2026	Jair Fernandez	Great Lakes Loons	Los Angeles Dodgers	2nd	1st	75–54	

== Wins by team ==
Active Midwest League teams appear in bold.

Team	Award(s)	Year(s)
**Wisconsin Timber Rattlers** (Appleton Foxes)	7	1962, 1967, 1969, 1971, 1978, 1992, 2024
**Cedar Rapids Kernels** (Cedar Rapids Cardinals/Giants/Reds)	6	1968, 1976, 1988, 1989, 2002, 2023
**West Michigan Whitecaps**	6	1997, 2000, 2006, 2007, 2017, 2025
Kane County Cougars	5	1999, 2001, 2003, 2004, 2014
Waterloo Indians (Waterloo Hawks/Royals)	5	1960, 1975, 1978, 1981, 1983
**Great Lakes Loons**	4	2010, 2019, 2022, 2026
**Quad Cities River Bandits** (Quad Cities Cubs/Angels)	4	1982, 1990, 2015, 2021
**South Bend Cubs** (South Bend Silver Hawks)	4	2005, 2008, 2013, 2016
Burlington Bees	3	1965, 1966, 1977
Danville Warriors	3	1970, 1972, 1973
Clinton Giants (Clinton C-Sox)	2	1963, 1993
Kenosha Twins	2	1985, 1987
**Lansing Lugnuts**	2	2011, 2012
Michigan Battle Cats	2	1995, 1998
**Peoria Chiefs**	2	1996, 2009
Wisconsin Rapids Twins	2	1974, 1980
Belleville Stags	1	1947
**Beloit Sky Carp** (Beloit Brewers)	1	1984
Bowling Green Hot Rods	1	2018
Decatur Commodores	1	1959
**Fort Wayne TinCaps**	1	2009
Lafayette Red Sox	1	1956
Madison Muskies	1	1991
Michigan City White Caps	1	1958
Quincy Giants	1	1961
Rockford Royals	1	1994
Springfield Cardinals	1	1986
Wausau Timbers	1	1979

== Wins by organization ==
Active Midwest League–Major League Baseball affiliations appear in bold.

Organization	Award(s)	Year(s)
**Detroit Tigers**	7	1959, 1997, 2000, 2006, 2007, 2017, 2025
Chicago White Sox	5	1963, 1967, 1969, 1971, 1978
**Milwaukee Brewers**	5	1972, 1973, 1977, 1984, 2024
**Minnesota Twins**	5	1974, 1980, 1985, 1987, 2023
**Oakland Athletics** (Kansas City Athletics)	5	1965, 1966, 1991, 2003, 2004
Boston Red Sox	4	1956, 1960, 1995, 1998
**Chicago Cubs**	4	1982, 2009, 2014, 2016
**Los Angeles Dodgers**	4	2010, 2019, 2022, 2026
San Francisco Giants	4	1958, 1961 1976, 1993
Arizona Diamondbacks	3	2005, 2008, 2013
**Cleveland Guardians** (Cleveland Indians)	3	1978, 1981, 1983
**Kansas City Royals**	3	1975, 1992, 1994
**St. Louis Cardinals**	3	1968, 1986, 1996
Baltimore Orioles (St. Louis Browns)	2	1947, 1962
**Cincinnati Reds**	2	1988, 1989
Los Angeles Angels (California/Anaheim Angels)	2	1990, 2002
Houston Astros	2	2015, 2021
**Miami Marlins** (Florida Marlins)	2	1999, 2001
Toronto Blue Jays	2	2011, 2012
**San Diego Padres**	1	2009
Tampa Bay Rays	1	2018
