= The Good Earth (disambiguation) =

The Good Earth is a Pulitzer Prize-winning novel by Pearl S. Buck.

The Good Earth or Good Earth, may also refer to:

- The Good Earth (film), the 1937 adaptation of the novel, starring Paul Muni and Luise Rainer
- The Good Earth (Manfred Mann's Earth Band album), 1974
- The Good Earth (The Feelies album), 1986
- Good Earth Tea, a tea company based in Santa Cruz, California
- Good Earth (restaurant chain), US health food franchise restaurant from the 1970s and 1980s

== See also ==
- Goodland (disambiguation)
- Good (disambiguation)
- Earth (disambiguation)
- Terrebonne (disambiguation) (French: Good Earth)
- Bonne Terre (disambiguation) (French: Good Earth)
