= Dave Joppie =

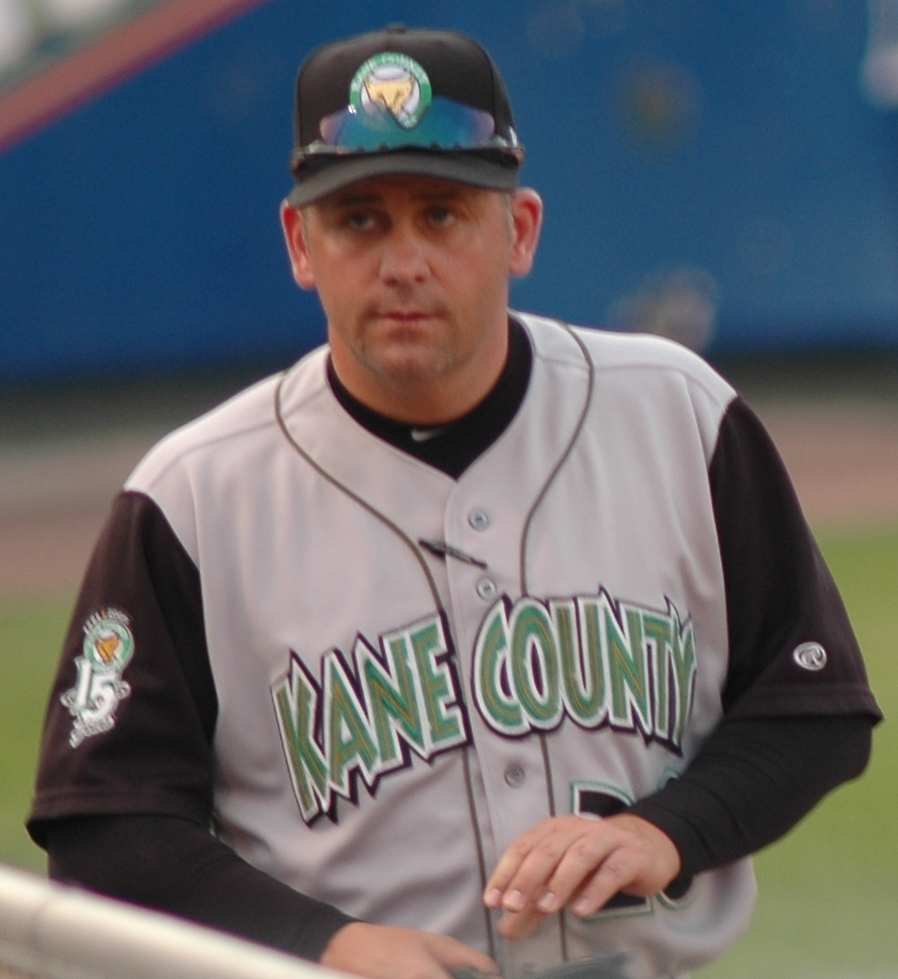
- Joppie with the Kane County Cougars in 2005
- Hitting coach
- Born: December 11, 1965 (age 59); Hastings, Michigan
- Bats: Right Throws: Right

Managing statistics
- Games: 354
- Wins: 189
- Losses: 165
- W-L%: .534

Teams
- Huntsville Stars (1995–1996, 1998); Modesto A's (1997); Visalia Oaks (1999); Vancouver Canadians (2000) [manager]; Midland RockHounds (2001–2003); Kane County Cougars (2004–2005) [manager]; Wilmington Blue Rocks (2006); Lancaster JetHawks (2007); Portland Sea Dogs (2008–2012); Pawtucket Red Sox (2013–2014); Portland Sea Dogs (2015); Carolina Mudcats (2017); Colorado Springs Sky Sox (2018); Wisconsin Timber Rattlers (2019)

Career highlights and awards
- MIDW Manager of the Year (2004); Baseball America's Class Low-A Minor League Manager of the Year (2004); Arizona Fall League-Surprise Saguaros (2012)

David Joppie (born December 11, 1965) is an American professional baseball coach and minor league manager.

Joppie is a former Lakewood High School graduate, Aquinas College baseball player and men's college basketball official. He worked games in the Great Lakes Intercollegiate Athletic Conference, Michigan Intercollegiate Athletic Association and Wolverine-Hoosier Athletic Conference for almost 20 years, deciding to retire from officiating after the 2009–2010 basketball season to concentrate exclusively on baseball.

In 1995 Joppie joined the Oakland Athletics organization as the hitting coach of the Double-A Huntsville Stars for two seasons. He went on to coach Class A+ Modesto A's (1997), then returned with Huntsville (1998) before joining Class A+ Visalia Oaks (1999).

In 2000, he was promoted to manage Single-A Vancouver Canadians. He led his team to a record of 39-37 (.513), good for a fourth place in the Northwest League. He returned to coaching with Double-A Midland RockHounds from 2001 to 2003 and later managed Class-A Kane County Cougars in 2004 and 2005.

In his first season with the Cougars, Joppie guided them to a first-place finish in the Midwest League West Division with a record of 83-56 (.597), but lost the final series to the West Michigan Whitecaps. At the end of the season, he was named both Midwest League Manager of the Year and Baseball America's Class Low-A Minor League Manager of the Year. In 2005, his team finished with a mark of 70-69 (.504) and failed to secure a playoff berth.

Joppie worked in the Athletics system in 11 uninterrupted seasons before joining the Boston Red Sox organization as the hitting coach for Class-A Wilmington Blue Rocks in 2006. He then joined Single-A Lancaster JetHawks in 2007, helping the team to a record offensive season in which they set all-time California League records with 1,081 runs and 217 home runs while leading the circuit in batting average (.296), hits (1,493), and base on balls (672).

He continued his success as a hitting coach upon coming to Double-A Portland Sea Dogs in 2008, where he guided the team to the best on-base percentage in the 12-team Eastern League in his first season (.351) and in 2010 (.347).

In 2011 the Sea Dogs topped the league in runs (684), doubles (298) and slugging average (.422), along with the second best on-base pct. (.339) and the third best in batting average (.267). The Portland hitters batted for a combined .255 average in 2012, while leading the league in doubles (272) and ending fourth in home runs (112).

He gained a promotion to Triple-A Pawtucket Red Sox of the International League for the 2013 season. and returned to Pawtucket in the same capacity in 2014 helping guide the Paw Sox' hitters to the International League championship.

For the 2015 season, Joppie headed back to the Double-A Portland Sea Dogs for his tenth and final year with the Boston Red Sox organization.

As a batting coach during his Boston tenure, Joppie has been credited for the development of players such as Josh Reddick (2008–2009), Ryan Kalish (2009–2010), Daniel Nava (2009), Ryan Lavarnway (2010–2011), Anthony Rizzo (2010), Will Middlebrooks (2011), Xander Bogaerts (2012-2013), Jackie Bradley Jr. (2012-2014) and Mookie Betts (2014).

In 2017, Dave signed a contract with the Milwaukee Brewers to become the hitting coach for the Single-A Carolina Mudcats of the Carolina League. On January 31, 2018, Joppie was named hitting coach for the Colorado Springs Sky Sox, the Brewers' Triple-A affiliate. In 2019, he was named the hitting coach for the Wisconsin Timber Rattlers.
