= Goodland (surname) =

Goodland is an English surname. Notable people with the surname include:

- Edward Goodland (1883–1974), English cricket player
- Geoff Goodland (born 1955), American curler
- Ken Goodland (born 1940), Australian rules footballer
- Roger Goodland (1880–1944), English bibliographer and author
- Walter Samuel Goodland (1862–1947), American lawyer and politician

== See also ==
- Alastair Goodlad (born 1943), Baron Goodlad, British Conservative politician
