= Bruce Fields =

American baseball player and coach (born 1960)

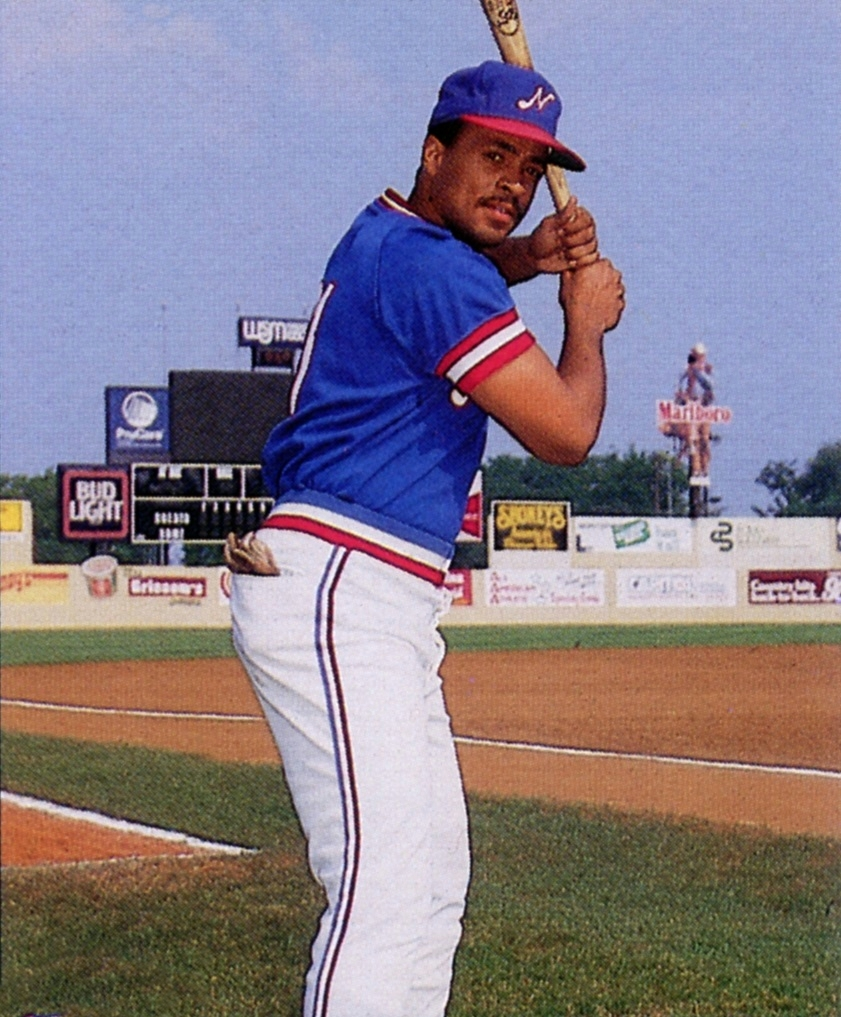
- Fields with the Nashville Sounds in 1986
- Outfielder
- Born: October 6, 1960 (age 65); Cleveland, Ohio, U.S.
- Batted: Left Threw: Right

MLB debut
- September 3, 1986, for the Detroit Tigers

Last MLB appearance
- July 14, 1989, for the Seattle Mariners

MLB statistics
- Batting average: .274
- Home runs: 1
- Runs batted in: 11
- Stats at Baseball Reference

Teams
- as player: Detroit Tigers (1986); Seattle Mariners (1988–1989); as coach: Detroit Tigers (2003)–(2005); Cleveland Indians (2011)–(2012)

Bruce Alan Fields (born October 6, 1960) is an American former professional baseball outfielder, manager, and coach. He played during three seasons in Major League Baseball (MLB) for the Detroit Tigers and Seattle Mariners.

== Playing career ==
Fields was drafted by the Tigers in the seventh round of the 1978 MLB draft out of Lansing Community College. He played his first professional season with their Rookie league Bristol Tigers in 1978, and split his last season between twoTriple-A clubs, the Richmond Braves and the Syracuse Chiefs, in 1991. In 1978, he was a Florida State League All-Star and led the league in stolen bases. He led the Southern League in batting average in 1985, then the American Association in batting average in 1986.

Fields made his MLB debut with the Tigers on September 3, 1986, getting a hit against the Mariners. He played in 16 games for the Tigers, batting .279, then spent 1987 back in the minors, setting a Toledo Mud Hens single-season record with 32 doubles.

After that season, Detroit traded Fields to the Mariners for Stan Clarke. He made the Mariners Opening Day roster but was sent down after batting 2-for-14. He returned to the majors in July, hitting a pinch-hit home run against the Chicago White Sox, his only MLB home run, on July 25. He had his best stretch in the majors, hitting .302 after his recall. He played in three games for the Mariners in 1989, ending his MLB career.

== Coaching career ==
After ending his playing career, Fields began coaching in the Tigers organization. He was a minor league hitting coach from 1992 to 1994, then managed the Jamestown Jammers for two seasons. From 1997 through 2000, Fields was manager of the Class A West Michigan Whitecaps, leading them in 2000 to the league's best record and winning the Midwest League Manager of the Year Award twice (1997 and 2000). He managed the Triple-A Toledo Mud Hens for two seasons, before serving as hitting coach for the Detroit Tigers from 2003 to 2005.

In 2006, Fields joined the Cleveland Indians organization, as the hitting coach for the Buffalo Bisons. He became the hitting coach for Cleveland on June 19, 2011. After the 2012 season, he became a minor league instructor with the Tigers.

Fields was a hitting coach in the New York Mets system in 2019 and 2021.

== Personal life ==
Fields' son, Daniel Fields, played one MLB game for the Tigers on June 4, 2015. Fields' older son, Aaron, a former minor league prospect in the Cleveland's farm system, was in attendance.

Fields was a basketball teammate of Magic Johnson at Everett High School (Michigan) in Lansing, Michigan, starting on the school's 1977 Class A Michigan High School Athletic Association championship team.
