= John Mizerock =

American baseball player and coach (born 1960)

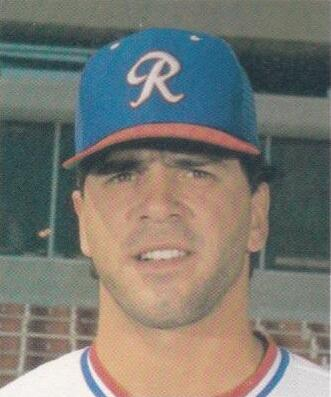
- Mizerock with the Richmond Braves c. 1987
- Catcher / Coach
- Born: December 8, 1960 (age 65); Punxsutawney, Pennsylvania, U.S.
- Batted: Left Threw: Right

MLB debut
- April 12, 1983, for the Houston Astros

Last MLB appearance
- October 1, 1989, for the Atlanta Braves

MLB statistics
- Batting average: .186
- Home runs: 2
- Runs batted in: 24
- Stats at Baseball Reference
- Managerial record at Baseball Reference

Teams
- As player: Houston Astros (1983–1986); Atlanta Braves (1989); As manager: Kansas City Royals (2002); As coach: Kansas City Royals (2002–2004, 2008–2009); Philadelphia Phillies (2014–2015)

John Joseph Mizerock (/ˈmɪzərɒk/; born December 8, 1960) is an American former Major League Baseball (MLB) catcher who played for the Houston Astros and the Atlanta Braves. He was the eighth overall pick in the 1979 Major League Baseball draft. He later served as a coach for the Kansas City Royals and Philadelphia Phillies. He is currently the hitting coach for the Clearwater Threshers.

== Houston Astros ==
The Houston Astros drafted eighteen-year-old Mizerock straight out of Punxsutawney High School where he was a three sport all-star athlete (Football, Basketball, Baseball) in Punxsutawney, Pennsylvania. He was the second of five catchers selected in the first round of the June 1979 draft. After four seasons in their farm system, in which he batted .228 with eighteen home runs (twelve of which were hit in 1982) and 143 runs batted in, Mizerock made the Astros out of spring training 1983 as Alan Ashby's back-up. He allowed three passed balls in a game against the Cincinnati Reds on April 19 to not only lose the back-up catcher job, but to also get himself sent back down to the minors. In fairness to Mizerock, knuckleballer Joe Niekro was pitching.

After Ashby was lost for a month of the season with a viral infection in his ear, Mizerock was called back up. However, he only appeared in four games during that span, and was optioned back down to the triple A Tucson Toros upon Ashby's return. He was brought back up for a third time in mid-August, and remained on the major league roster through the end of the season. He had a second game with Niekro on the mound on August 31 in which he had two passed balls. In all, Mizerock had eleven passed balls for the season; eight of which occurred with Niekro pitching.

After spending all of the 1984 season with the double A Columbus Astros, he returned to Houston late in the 1985 season to fill in for an injured Ashby. He was with the Astros on and off throughout their division winning 1986 season, and was on their post-season roster, but did not make an appearance in the 1986 National League Championship Series against the New York Mets. He was released after the season.

== Atlanta Braves ==
Mizerock spent spring training 1987 with the Montreal Expos, but failed to make the club. Just as the season was set to begin, he signed with the Atlanta Braves. Mizerock batted .240 with eight home runs and 94 RBIs in three seasons with the Richmond Braves to earn a September call-up to Atlanta in 1989. He batted .222 with two RBIs in eleven games. After one more season in the Braves' minor league system, Mizerock retired.

== Coaching ==
Since retiring as a player, Mizerock has served as a minor league manager, a coach and interim manager with the Kansas City Royals. He is a two time winner of the Dick Howser Award, awarded for outstanding contributions to the Royals organization (1996 and 2007).

Mizerock's first managerial job came with the rookie league Eugene Emeralds in 1993. After leading the team to a 40-36 record, he was promoted to the Class A Rockford Royals in 1994, where he earned Midwest League Manager of the Year honors. Mizerock moved to the Carolina League's Wilmington Blue Rocks in 1995, where he was again named his league's manager of the year. In 1996, Wilmington won the league championship with Mizerock at the helm. He remained with Wilmington through 1997 before moving on to the Wichita Wranglers in 1998. Mizerock won the Texas League title and was Minor League Manager of the Year with Wichita in 1999. He spent the 2000 & 2001 seasons with the Omaha Golden Spikes before getting his first major league coaching gig with the major league club in 2002. He compiled 646 wins and 554 losses in his minor league managerial career.

Mizerock was promoted from bullpen coach to interim manager of the Royals 23 games into the season when Tony Muser was fired. His first game managing was against the Detroit Tigers, who were being managed by Luis Pujols on an interim basis. Pujols and Mizerock were teammates on the 1983 Houston Astros, competing for the back-up catcher job.

After losing their first six games under Mizerock, the Royals won five of their next seven before he was replaced by Tony Peña. In all, he led his team to a 5–8 record in thirteen games. 2002 was the first time in franchise history that Kansas City had lost 100 games. He stayed on as third base coach for the Royals until the end of 2004, when he was assigned to be a roving instructor for the organization. He accepted a position to once again manage the high level Class A Wilmington Blue Rocks minor league team for the 2007 season. With his leadership, the team led the Carolina League in winning percentage, and returned to the playoffs.

On October 23, 2007, Mizerock was named the Royals' bullpen coach for the 2008 season. His contract was not renewed following the 2009 season.

Mizerock moved to the Philadelphia Phillies organization in 2011 as hitting coach of their Florida State League affiliate, the Clearwater Threshers. He became the assistant hitting coach of the Philadelphia Phillies on December 18, 2013, and later became their third base coach. Mizerock was not retained by the Phillies following the 2015 season. He later accepted a position as a coach for Philadelphia's Short Season-A team, the Williamsport Crosscutters for the 2016 season. Mizerock was named as the pitching coach for the Clearwater Threshers of the 2018 season.
