= Bonne Terre =

Bonneterre or Bonne Terre (French: Good Earth), may refer to:

== Places ==
- Bonne Terre, Missouri, USA; a city in St. Francois County
  - Bonne Terre Mine, also known as the St. Joseph Lead Mine, a show mine and dive resort
  - Bonne Terre station on the Mississippi River and Bonne Terre Railway, a NRHP-listed depot
- Bonneterre Formation, St. Francois Mountains, Ozarks; a geological formation in Missouri, USA
- Bonne Terre (suburb), Vacoas-Phoenix, Mauritius

== Other uses ==
- Bonne Terre Limited, operating as Sky Betting & Gaming, a British gambling company

== See also ==
- Mississippi River and Bonne Terre Railway
- Bonne (disambiguation)
- Terre
- Terrebonne (disambiguation)
- The Good Earth (disambiguation) (French: La Bonne Terre, la Terrebonne)
- Goodland (disambiguation) (French: Bonne Terre, Terrebonne)
- Pierre Joseph Bonnaterre (1752–1804), French zoologist
