= Wisconsin Timber Rattlers =

Minor League Baseball team in Grand Chute, Wisconsin

- Founded in 1958 in Appleton, Wisconsin; Based in Grand Chute, Wisconsin since 1995
Team logo
Cap insignia

Minor league affiliations
- Class: High-A (2021–present)
- Previous classes: Class A (1963–2020); Class D (1962); Class B (1958–1961)
- League: Midwest League (1962–present)
- Division: West Division
- Previous leagues: Three–I League (1958–1961)

Major league affiliations
- Team: Milwaukee Brewers (2009–present)
- Previous teams: Seattle Mariners (1993–2008); Kansas City Royals (1987–1992); Chicago White Sox (1966–1986); Baltimore Orioles (1960–1965); Washington Senators (1958–1959)

Minor league titles
- League titles (10): 1960; 1964; 1966; 1967; 1969; 1978; 1982; 1983; 1984; 2012
- Division titles (12): 1971; 1972; 1974; 1978; 1983; 1984; 1985; 1996; 1999; 2005; 2012; 2024
- First-half titles (11): 1966; 1969; 1971; 1978; 1992; 1996; 1997; 1998; 2005; 2012; 2024
- Second-half titles (10): 1964; 1967; 1969; 1971; 1972; 1974; 1999; 2000; 2001; 2005
- Wild card berths (4): 1982; 2003; 2014; 2016

Team data
- Name: Wisconsin Timber Rattlers (1995–present)
- Previous names: Appleton Foxes (1967–1994); Fox Cities Foxes (1958–1966)
- Colors: Burgundy, tan, black, silver, white
- Mascots: Fang and Whiffer
- Ballpark: Neuroscience Group Field at Fox Cities Stadium (1995–present)
- Previous parks: Goodland Field (1958–1994)
- Owner/ Operator: Diamond Baseball Holdings
- President: Rob Zerjav
- General manager: Rob Zerjav
- Manager: Nick Stanley
- Website: milb.com/wisconsin

The Wisconsin Timber Rattlers are a Minor League Baseball team of the Midwest League and the High-A affiliate of the Milwaukee Brewers. They are located in Grand Chute, Wisconsin, a town on the outskirts of Appleton in the Fox Cities, and are named for the timber rattlesnake, which is more commonly found in southwest Wisconsin. The team plays their home games at Neuroscience Group Field at Fox Cities Stadium, which opened in 1995. They previously played at Goodland Field from their founding in 1958 until the end of the 1994 season.

Originally known as the Fox Cities Foxes, the team began play in 1958 as members of the Three–I League. The circuit suspended operations after the 1961 season, so the club joined the Midwest League in 1962. They became known as the Appleton Foxes in 1967 and adopted their Wisconsin Timber Rattlers moniker in 1995. In conjunction with Major League Baseball's reorganization of Minor League Baseball in 2021, Wisconsin was shifted to the High-A Central, which was renamed the Midwest League in 2022.

Wisconsin has served as a farm club for six Major League Baseball franchises. They have won ten league titles, including one Three–I League championship and nine Midwest League championships, most recently in 2012.

== History ==
=== Prior professional baseball in Appleton ===
Appleton, the largest of Wisconsin's Fox Cities, has hosted Minor League Baseball teams since the late 19th century. The city's professional baseball history dates back to 1891 with the formation of the Appleton Papermakers in the single-season Wisconsin State League. The city was home to a new Papermakers team in the Wisconsin–Illinois League from 1909 to 1914. The Wisconsin State League was revived in 1940 with the Papermakers as members from 1940 to 1942 and 1946 to 1953 when the team and its league disbanded.

=== Washington Senators (1958–1959) ===
In 1958, the Fox Cities Foxes joined the Illinois–Indiana–Iowa League, popularly known as the Three–I League, as the Class B affiliate of the Washington Senators. Their home ballpark was Goodland Field in Appleton. This team was owned and operated by Appleton Baseball Club, Inc., a non-stock and nonprofit organization. Governed by a volunteer board of directors, this entity continued to own and operate the franchise through 2020.

The Foxes played their inaugural game on the road against the Davenport DavSox on April 27, 1958, a 9–2 victory. Their first home game, a 6–0 win over the Cedar Rapids Braves, was played on May 3. The Senators affiliation ended after two seasons with the Foxes having a 115–140 record over that period.

=== Baltimore Orioles (1960–1965) ===
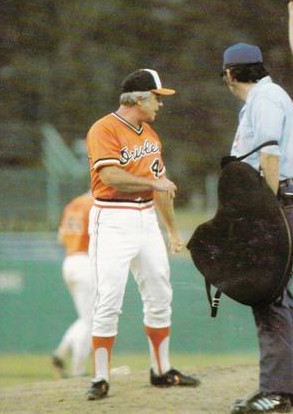
Earl Weaver managed the 1960 Foxes to win the Three–I League championship.

Prior to the 1960 season, the team became an affiliate of the Baltimore Orioles. Managed by future Baseball Hall of Famer Earl Weaver, they won the Three–I League championship pennant with a league-best 82–56 record in their first season with the Orioles. Third baseman Pete Ward was selected as the league's Most Valuable Player, and first baseman Boog Powell won the Rookie of the Year Award. The team also included pitcher Pat Gillick, who was later inducted in the Hall of Fame as an executive. The Three–I League suspended operations after the 1961 season, hoping to resume in 1963.

As a result, Fox Cities joined the Class D Midwest League (MWL) for 1962. Despite a sub-.500 season, Cal Ripken Sr. won the 1962 Midwest League Manager of the Year Award. The MWL was reclassified as a Class A league in 1963. Manager Billy DeMars led the 1964 Foxes to win the second half title, qualifying them for a single championship game against the Clinton C-Sox. The Foxes won the game, giving them their first Midwest League championship. The affiliation with Baltimore ended after the 1965 season with the Foxes having a 401–352 record over the six-year period.

=== Chicago White Sox (1966–1986) ===
The Foxes joined the Chicago White Sox organization in 1966. The partnership began with the club winning back-to-back Midwest League championships. Stan Wasiak managed the 1966 squad to the first half title and a 2–0 championship series win over the Cedar Rapids Cardinals. In 1967, then known as the Appleton Foxes, Manager of the Year Alex Cosmidis' team won the second half title before sweeping the Wisconsin Rapids Twins in two games to win the MWL crown again. Two years later, Tom Saffell's Foxes won both halves of the 1969 season and were named league champions without any playoffs being held. Saffell was selected for the league's Manager of the Year Award.

Appleton won three Northern Division titles from 1971 to 1974, but they lost the league title each time in the final round. Joe Sparks was recognized as the MWL Manager of the Year for 1971. Future Hall of Fame pitcher Goose Gossage played with Appleton from 1970 to 1971 and in 1974. Fellow Hall of Famer Harold Baines began his career with the Foxes in 1977. The 1978 team, under the management of Gordon Lund, set a franchise record with their 97–40 season. Having won the first half, they went on to capture the Northern Division title versus the Waterloo Indians, 2–0, before beating the Burlington Bees, 2–1, to win their fifth MWL championship. Lund won the season's Manager of the Year Award, and the team was recognized as one of the 100 greatest minor league teams of all-time by baseball historians in 2001.

From 1982 to 1984, the Foxes won three consecutive Midwest League championships. Clinching a wild card berth in 1982, Appleton won the semifinals against the Springfield Cardinals, 2–0, then claimed the league title over the Madison Muskies, 2–1, under manager Adrian Garrett. The 1983 Northern Division champions, then led by John Boles, won the semifinals versus Waterloo, 2–1, then won a second consecutive championship against Springfield, 3–1. Sal Rende's 1984 Foxes completed the back-to-back-to-back feat by winning the division, defeating Madison, 2–1, in the semifinals, and again taking the championship from Springfield in a full five-game series. The 1986 Foxes won another division title, but were kept from winning a fourth consecutive championship with elimination in the semifinals.

The White Sox affiliation ended after the 1986 season. Spanning 21 years, this was the longest affiliation in the minor league team's history. It was also the most successful in terms of their win–loss record with the team going 1,471–1,261 over that stretch.

=== Kansas City Royals (1987–1992) ===
Appleton affiliated with the Kansas City Royals in 1987. Aside from a 71–69 finish in 1987 and a 70–62 record with a first half title in 1992, the Foxes finished under .500 in four out of six years with the Royals. Pitcher Tom Gordon led the Midwest League with 172 strikeouts in 1988 and was named the league's Prospect of the Year. Tom Poquette, manager of the 1992 team, won the Manager of the Year Award. Appleton accumulated a 386–433 record during the affiliation.

=== Seattle Mariners (1993–2008) ===
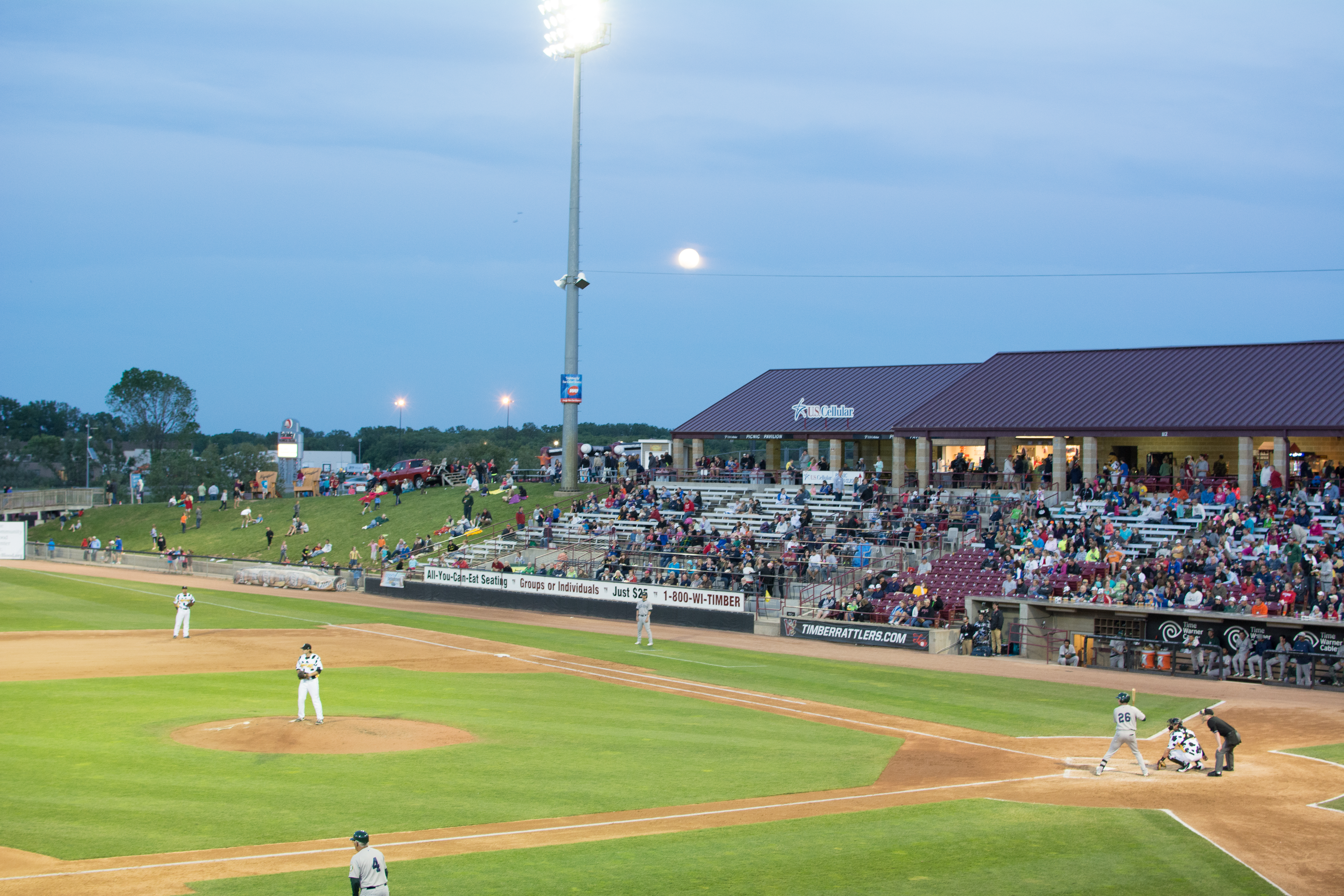
Fox Cities Stadium, home of the Timber Rattlers since 1995

Appleton became the Class A affiliate of the Seattle Mariners in 1993. On August 29, 1994, the Foxes played their final game at the 54-year-old Goodland Field. The 8–1 loss to the South Bend Silver Hawks was attended by a season-high 3,492 people. The team would move to the new $4.75-million Fox Cities Stadium in Grand Chute the next season. Also in 1995, after 37 seasons as the Foxes, the team rebranded as the Wisconsin Timber Rattlers. This change was made to increase their regional appeal outside the Fox Cities and to boost merchandise sales. "Timber Rattlers" was chosen by area school children who selected it from among three possible monikers along with several logos for each. The name refers to the timber rattlesnake, which is not typically found in the Appleton area but is more common in southwest Wisconsin. The team's scheduled April 5, 1995, home opener at their new facility was postponed due to snow and rescheduled for the next afternoon as a doubleheader. The Timber Rattlers won both games, defeating the West Michigan Whitecaps, 3–1 and 8–6, before an audience of 1,937 people.

In 1994, shortstop Alex Rodriguez was selected as the league's Prospect of the Year after hitting for a .319 batting average with 14 home runs and 55 RBI in just 65 games. Wisconsin failed to reach the postseason in their first three seasons with Seattle. As first-half winners in 1996, they won the Central Division title versus the Peoria Chiefs, 2–1, and then beat the Quad Cities River Bandits, 2–1, to advance to the championship round, but they were defeated by West Michigan, 3–1. The 1997 and 1998 teams repeated as first half champions, but were each eliminated in the divisional rounds. In 1999, the Timber Rattlers qualified for the postseason with a second half title, won the Central Division over the Rockford Reds, 2–0, advanced through the semifinals over the Lansing Lugnuts, 2–0, but again lost the championship to Burlington, 3–2. The team won second half titles and the quarterfinals in the next two seasons but were unable to win in the divisional rounds, and the 2003 first-half winners did not make it past the quarterfinals. In 2005, Wisconsin won both halves, the quarterfinals over the Beloit Snappers, 2–1, and the Western Division title against the Clinton LumberKings, 2–0, but failed to win the league championship as they were defeated by South Bend, 3–2.

The Mariners affiliation ended after the 2008 season without any further postseason appearances. Over the 16-year relationship, Wisconsin had a 1,077–1,124 record.

=== Milwaukee Brewers (2009–present) ===
The Timber Rattlers affiliated with the Milwaukee Brewers in 2009. Managed by Matt Erickson, Wisconsin qualified for the postseason in 2012 after a six-year absence from the playoffs. Having won the first half, they won the quarterfinals over Burlington, 2–1, and the Western Division title versus Clinton, 2–0. They ended the postseason by winning their ninth Midwest League championship over Fort Wayne, 3–1. That same season, the franchise won the Larry MacPhail Award for outstanding minor league promotions. Their most recent postseason appearances came in 2014 and 2016 via second half titles, but the Timber Rattlers were eliminated in each quarterfinal round.

Following the 2020 season, Appleton Baseball Club, Inc, sold the team to Third Base Ventures, LLC, a group consisting of principal owner Craig Dickman and minority owners team president Rob Zerjav and Brad Raaths. The group also purchased the team's ballpark from the Fox Cities Amateur Sports Authority with plans to keep the team in Grand Chute. Major League Baseball assumed control of Minor League Baseball before the 2021 season in a move to increase player salaries, modernize facility standards, and reduce travel. As a result, the Midwest League disbanded and the Timber Rattlers were elevated to the High-A classification and placed in the High-A Central, where they continued their affiliation with Milwaukee. Wisconsin began competition in the new league on May 4 with a 2–1 victory over the Beloit Snappers at Fox Cities Stadium. They ended the season in third place in the West Division with a 59–60 record. In 2022, the High-A Central became known as the Midwest League, the name historically used by the regional circuit prior to the 2021 reorganization. Wisconsin placed second in both halves of the split-season, missing out on qualifying for the postseason. Their season record was 69–60. They did not win either half of the 2023 season in which they finished 62–68. The Timber Rattlers won the first-half of the 2024 season with a record of 42–44, clinching a spot in the playoffs. They won the Western Division title over the Quad Cities River Bandits, 2–0, but were defeated in the championship series by the Lake County Captains, 2–1. Wisconsin posted a season record of 77–54. Victor Estevez won the Midwest League Manager of the Year Award.

In April 2025, Third Base Ventures, LLC, sold the Timber Rattlers and their ballpark to Diamond Baseball Holdings, an organization that owns and operates other affiliated minor league teams across the country. Over 18 complete seasons of competition as a Brewers farm club, the Timber Rattlers hold a regular-season win–loss record of 1,100–1,190.

== Season-by-season records ==
Key
League	The team's final position in the league standings
Division	The team's final position in the divisional standings
GB	Games behind the team that finished in first place in the division that season
†	League champions (1958–present)
*	Division champions (1971–present)
^	Postseason berth (1958–present)

Season-by-season records
Season	League	Regular-season					Postseason			MLB affiliate	Ref.
Season	League	Record	Win %	League	Division	GB	Record	Win %	Result	MLB affiliate	Ref.
1958	IIIL	56–73	.434	6th	—	20 1/2	—	—	Result	—	Washington Senators
1959	IIIL	59–67	.468	4th	—	19	—	—	—	Washington Senators	
1960 †	IIIL	82–56	.594	1st	—	—	—	—	Won IIIL championship	Baltimore Orioles	
1961	IIIL	67–62	.519	4th	—	12	—	—	—	Baltimore Orioles	
1962	MWL	61–63	.492	7th	—	12 1/2	—	—	—	Baltimore Orioles	
1963	MWL	55–65	.458	8th	—	26	—	—	—	Baltimore Orioles	
1964^ †	MWL	81–43	.653	1st	—	—	1–0	1.000	Won second-half title Won MWL championship vs. Clinton C-Sox, 1–0	Baltimore Orioles	
1965	MWL	55–63	.466	7th	—	25	—	—	—	Baltimore Orioles	
1966^ †	MWL	77–47	.621	2nd	—	5 1/2	2–0	1.000	Won first-half title Won MWL championship vs. Cedar Rapids Cardinals, 2–0	Chicago White Sox	
1967^ †	MWL	71–46	.607	1st	—	—	2–0	1.000	Won second-half title Won MWL championship vs. Wisconsin Rapids Twins, 2–0	Chicago White Sox	
1968	MWL	57–61	.483	6th	—	12 1/2	—	—	—	Chicago White Sox	
1969 †	MWL	84–41	.672	1st	—	—	—	—	Won first and second-half titles Won MWL championship	Chicago White Sox	
1970	MWL	64–60	.516	5th	—	9 1/2	—	—	—	Chicago White Sox	
1971^ *	MWL	79–44	.642	1st	1st	—	1–2	.333	Won First and Second-Half Northern Division titles Won Northern Division title Lost MWL championship vs. Quad Cities Angels, 2–1	Chicago White Sox	
1972^ *	MWL	76–51	.598	1st	1st	—	1–2	.333	Won Second-Half Northern Division title Won Northern Division title vs. Wisconsin Rapids Twins, 1–0; Lost MWL championship vs. Danville Warriors, 2–0	Chicago White Sox	
1973	MWL	44–76	.367	10th	5th	27	—	—	—	Chicago White Sox	
1974^ *	MWL	73–50	.593	2nd	2nd	4 1/2	3–2	.600	Won Second-Half Northern Division title Won Northern Division title vs. Wisconsin Rapids Twins, 2–0; Lost MWL championship vs. Danville Warriors, 2–1	Chicago White Sox	
1975	MWL	50–77	.394	9th	5th	42 1/2	—	—	—	Chicago White Sox	
1976	MWL	56–74	.431	10th	5th	22	—	—	—	Chicago White Sox	
1977	MWL	54–84	.391	8th	4th	26	—	—	—	Chicago White Sox	
1978^ * †	MWL	97–40	.708	1st	1st	—	4–1	.800	Won First-Half Northern Division title Won Northern Division title vs. Waterloo Indians, 2–0; Won MWL championship vs. Burlington Bees, 2–1	Chicago White Sox	
1979	MWL	63–72	.467	5th	3rd	18	—	—	—	Chicago White Sox	
1980	MWL	76–63	.547	2nd	2nd	9	—	—	—	Chicago White Sox	
1981	MWL	54–80	.403	6th	4th	31	—	—	—	Chicago White Sox	
1982^ * †	MWL	81–59	.579	3rd	2nd	6 1/2	4–1	.800	Won wild card berth Won semifinals vs. Springfield Cardinals, 2–0; Won MWL championship vs. Madison Muskies, 2–1	Chicago White Sox	
1983 * †	MWL	87–50	.635	1st	1st	—	5–2	.714	Won Northern Division title Won semifinals vs. Waterloo Indians, 2–1; Won MWL championship vs. Springfield Cardinals, 3–1	Chicago White Sox	
1984 * †	MWL	87–49	.640	1st	1st	—	5–3	.625	Won Northern Division title Won semifinals vs. Madison Muskies, 2–1; Won MWL championship vs. Springfield Cardinals, 3–2	Chicago White Sox	
1985 *	MWL	85–54	.612	1st	1st	—	1–2	.333	Won Northern Division title Lost semifinals vs. Kenosha Twins, 2–1	Chicago White Sox	
1986	MWL	56–83	.403	11th	3rd	29 1/2	—	—	—	Chicago White Sox	
1987	MWL	71–69	.507	6th (tie)	2nd	11	—	—	—	Kansas City Royals	
1988	MWL	58–82	.414	13th	6th	26	—	—	—	Kansas City Royals	
1989	MWL	67–68	.496	7th	3rd	19 1/2	—	—	—	Kansas City Royals	
1990	MWL	62–71	.466	8th	4th	14 1/2	—	—	—	Kansas City Royals	
1991	MWL	58–81	.417	14th	7th	19 1/2	—	—	—	Kansas City Royals	
1992^	MWL	70–62	.530	10th	3rd	5 1/2	1–2	.333	Won First-Half Northern Division title Lost Northern Division title vs. Beloit Brewers, 2–1	Kansas City Royals	
1993	MWL	62–73	.459	9th	6th	17 1/2	—	—	—	Seattle Mariners	
1994	MWL	75–64	.540	4th	3rd	14	—	—	—	Seattle Mariners	
1995	MWL	63–75	.457	12th	4th	24 1/2	—	—	—	Seattle Mariners	
1996^ *	MWL	77–58	.570	2nd	2nd	1 1/2	5–5	.500	Won First-Half Central Division title Won Central Division title vs. Peoria Chiefs, 2–1; Won semifinals vs. Quad Cities River Bandits, 2–1; Lost MWL championship vs. West Michigan Whitecaps, 3–1	Seattle Mariners	
1997^	MWL	76–63	.547	2nd	1st	—	0–2	.000	Won First-Half Central Division title Lost Central Division title vs. Kane County Cougars, 2–0	Seattle Mariners	
1998^	MWL	72–65	.526	5th	1st	—	1–2	.333	Won First-Half Central Division title Lost Central Division title vs. Rockford Cubbies, 2–1	Seattle Mariners	
1999^ *	MWL	72–66	.522	5th	3rd	6 1/2	6–3	.667	Won Second-Half Central Division title Won Central Division title vs. Rockford Reds, 2–0; Won semifinals vs. Lansing Lugnuts, 2–0; Lost MWL championship vs. Burlington Bees, 3–2	Seattle Mariners	
2000^	MWL	78–60	.565	3rd	1st	—	3–3	.500	Won Second-Half Western Division title Won quarterfinals vs. Kane County Cougars, 2–1; Lost Western Division title vs. Beloit Snappers, 2–1	Seattle Mariners	
2001^	MWL	84–52	.618	2nd	2nd	3	2–2	.500	Won Second-Half Western Division title Won quarterfinals vs. Quad Cities River Bandits, 2–0; Lost Western Division title vs. Kane County Cougars, 2–0	Seattle Mariners	
2002	MWL	53–86	.381	13th	8th	32 1/2	—	—	—	Seattle Mariners	
2003^	MWL	69–66	.511	6th (tie)	3rd (tie)	9	0–2	.000	Won First-Half Western Division wild card berth Lost quarterfinals vs. Beloit Snappers, 2–0	Seattle Mariners	
2004	MWL	57–82	.410	12th	7th	26	—	—	—	Seattle Mariners	
2005^ *	MWL	76–63	.547	2nd	1st	—	6–4	.600	Won First and Second-Half Western Division title Won quarterfinals vs. Beloit Snappers, 2–1; Won Western Division title vs. Clinton LumberKings, 2–0; Lost MWL championship vs. South Bend Silver Hawks, 3–2	Seattle Mariners	
2006	MWL	54–86	.386	13th	7th	25 1/2	—	—	—	Seattle Mariners	
2007	MWL	53–85	.384	14th	8th	25	—	—	—	Seattle Mariners	
2008	MWL	56–80	.412	13th	8th	21 1/2	—	—	—	Seattle Mariners	
2009	MWL	58–81	.417	12th	7th	23 1/2	—	—	—	Milwaukee Brewers	
2010	MWL	58–80	.420	14th	7th	25	—	—	—	Milwaukee Brewers	
2011	MWL	67–72	.482	10th (tie)	4th	15	—	—	—	Milwaukee Brewers	
2012^ * †	MWL	78–61	.561	3rd	1st	—	7–2	.778	Won First-Half Western Division title Won quarterfinals vs. Burlington Bees, 2–1; Won Western Division title vs. Clinton LumberKings, 2–0; Won MWL championship vs. Fort Wayne TinCaps, 3–1	Milwaukee Brewers	
2013	MWL	59–76	.437	13th	6th	27 1/2	—	—	—	Milwaukee Brewers	
2014^	MWL	72–67	.518	5th (tie)	3rd (tie)	18 1/2	0–2	.000	Won Second-Half Western Division wild card berth Lost quarterfinals vs. Kane County Cougars, 2–0	Milwaukee Brewers	
2015	MWL	50–89	.360	15th	7th	38 1/2	—	—	—	Milwaukee Brewers	
2016^	MWL	71–69	.507	8th	4th	15	0–2	.000	Won Second-Half Western Division wild card berth Lost quarterfinals vs. Cedar Rapids Kernels, 2–0	Milwaukee Brewers	
2017	MWL	59–79	.428	15th	8th	20	—	—	—	Milwaukee Brewers	
2018	MWL	68–71	.489	10th	7th	12 1/2	—	—	—	Milwaukee Brewers	
2019	MWL	69–70	.496	9th	5th	12	—	—	—	Milwaukee Brewers	
2020	MWL	Season cancelled (COVID-19 pandemic)								Milwaukee Brewers	
2021	A+C	59–60	.496	6th	3rd	18 1/2	—	—	—	Milwaukee Brewers	
2022	MWL	69–60	.535	6th	3rd	3	—	—	—	Milwaukee Brewers	
2023	MWL	62–68	.477	8th	3rd	19	—	—	—	Milwaukee Brewers	
2024^ *	MWL	77–54	.588	2nd	1st	—	3–2	.600	Won First-Half Western Division title Won Western Division title vs. Quad Cities River Bandits, 2–0; Lost MWL championship vs. Lake County Captains, 2–1	Milwaukee Brewers	
2025	MWL	56–74	.431	8th	4th	17	—	—	—	Milwaukee Brewers	
2026	MWL	68–59	.535	5th	3rd	8 1/2	—	—	—	Milwaukee Brewers	
Totals	—	4,550–4,501	.503	—	—	—	63–48	.568	—	—	—

Franchise totals by affiliation
Affiliation	Regular season		Postseason			Composite	
Affiliation	Record	Win %	Apps.	Record	Win %	Record	Win %
Washington Senators (1958–1959)	115–140	.451	0	—	—	115–140	.451
Baltimore Orioles (1960–1965)	401–352	.533	1	1–0	1.000	402–352	.533
Chicago White Sox (1966–1986)	1,471–1,261	.538	11	28–15	.651	1,499–1,276	.540
Kansas City Royals (1987–1992)	386–433	.471	1	1–2	.333	387–435	.471
Seattle Mariners (1993–2008)	1,077–1,124	.489	8	23–23	.500	1,100–1,147	.490
Milwaukee Brewers (2009–present)	1,100–1,190	.480	4	10–8	.556	1,110–1,198	.481
All-time	4,550–4,501	.503	25	63–48	.568	4,613–4,549	.503

== Radio and television ==
All home and road games are broadcast on WOSH 1490 AM. Live audio broadcasts are also available online through the team's website and the MiLB First Pitch app. All home games and select road games can be viewed through the MiLB.TV subscription feature of the official website of Minor League Baseball, with audio provided by a radio simulcast. Select home games are televised on WCWF CW 14 and WACY-TV The Spot- Green Bay 32 in Green Bay/Appleton, and on WVTV-DT2 My 24 in Milwaukee.

== Mascots ==
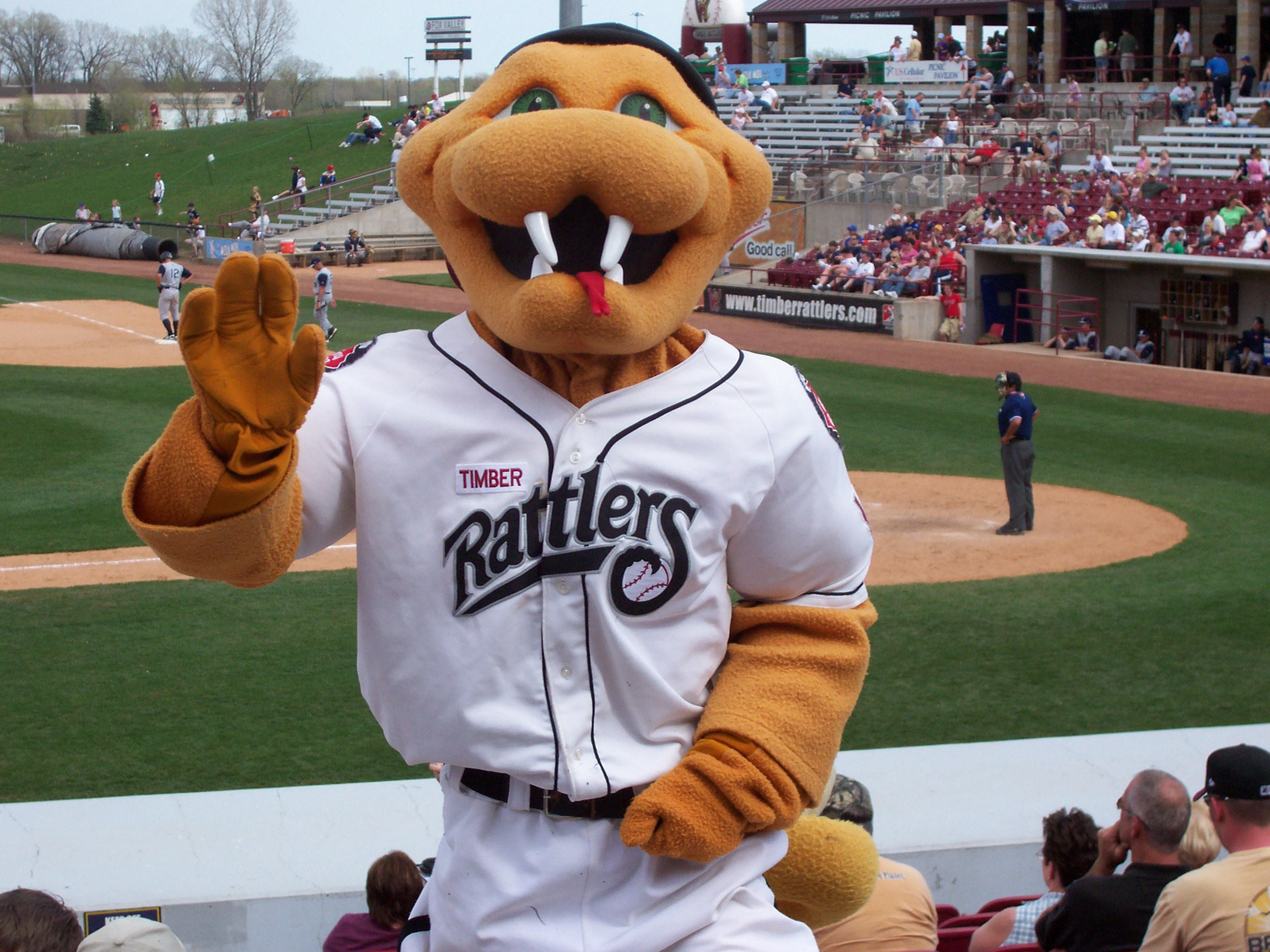
Fang, the team mascot

Wisconsin's primary mascot is an anthropomorphic timber rattler snake named Fang. He is golden yellow with a red tongue extending from his mouth and wears the same uniform as the team. Fang is joined by Whiffer, a secondary mascot whose appearance resembles that of the Phillie Phanatic with teal fur and green face and hands.

Prior to Fang and the 1995 rebrand, Appleton's mascot was Freddy Fox, an anthropomorphic fox who wore the team's jersey and cap. Circa 1980, the mascot was Homer Run, who was human in appearance and wore the same style uniform as the Foxes.

== Roster ==
Wisconsin Timber Rattlers roster
Players	Coaches/Other
Pitchers: 33 Jarrette Bonet; 18 Daniel Corniel; 35 Ethan Dorchies; 19 Jayden Dubanewicz; 27 Michael Fowler; 20 Andrew Healy; 31 Bjorn Johnson; 29 Jose Meneses; 31 Miqueas Mercedes; 34 Jacob Morrison; 28 Tanner Perry; 26 Joshua Quezada; 30 Yerlin Rodriguez; 13 JoJo Romero * #; 11 Abner Uribe * #; 23 Chandler Welch; -- Jason Woodward; Catchers: 15 Blayberg Diaz; 22 Tayden Hall; 5 Edgardo Ordonez; 17 Yannic Walther; Infielders: 1 Luiyin Alastre; 2 Juan Baez; 24 Eric Bitonti; 3 Daniel Dickinson; 14 Brady Ebel; 6 Juan Ortuno; 4 Tyler Rodriguez; Outfielders: 16 Luis Castillo; 12 Sawyer Strosnider	Manager: 7 Nick Stanley; Coaches: -- Evan Berliner (hitting); -- Patrick McGuff (pitching); 8 Liu Rodríguez (coach); 60-day injured list: -- Jesus Flores; 32 Quinton Low; -- Bryce Meccage; -- Bryan Rivera; -- Will Rudy (full season); 7-day injured list; * On Milwaukee Brewers 40-man roster; ~ Development list; # Rehab assignment; ∞ Reserve list; ‡ Restricted list; § Suspended list; † Temporarily inactive list; Roster updated August 31, 2026; Transactions; → More rosters: MiLB • Midwest League; → Milwaukee Brewers minor league players

== Achievements ==
=== Awards ===
Four players and seven managers have won league awards in recognition for their performance with the Foxes/Timber Rattlers.

Three–I League awards
Award	Recipient	Season	Ref.
Most Valuable Player	Pete Ward	1960	
Rookie of the Year	Boog Powell	1960	

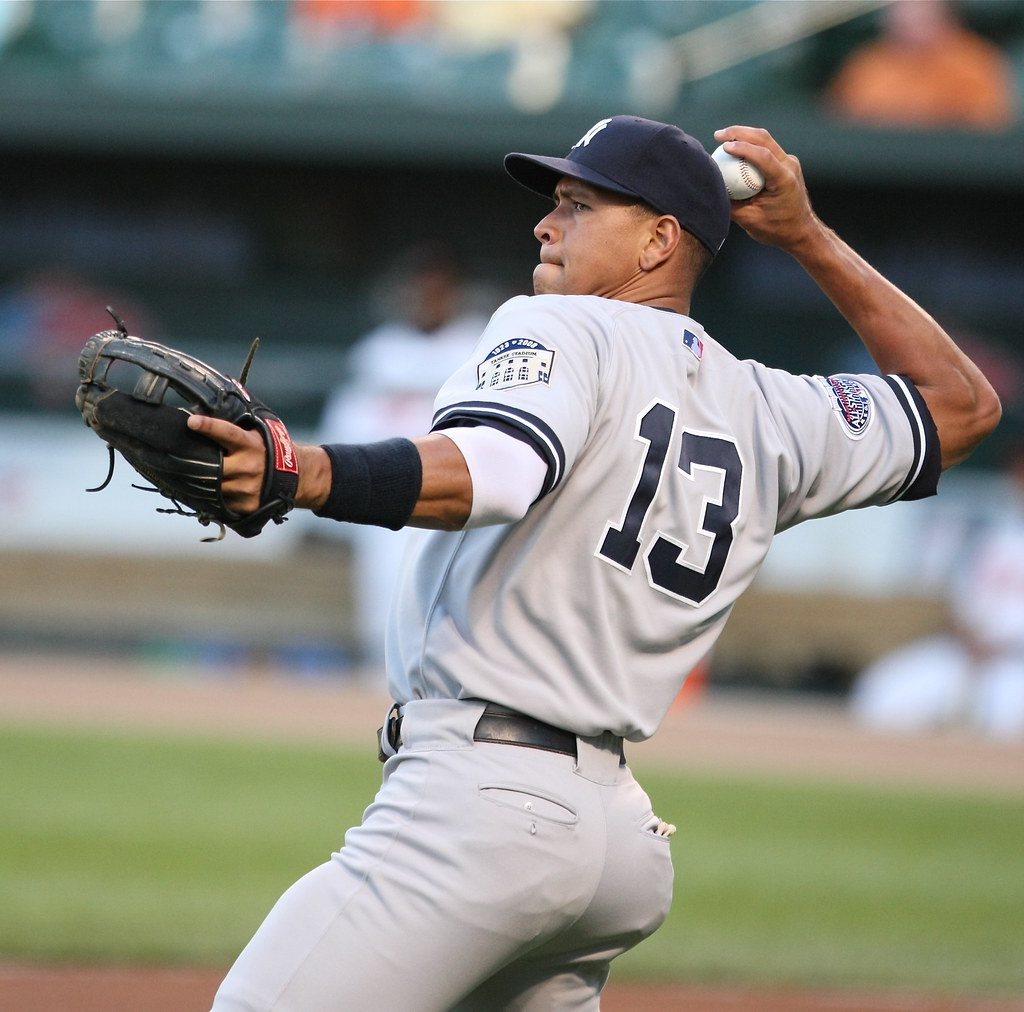
Alex Rodriguez won the 1994 MWL Prospect of the Year Award.

Midwest League awards
Award	Recipient	Season	Ref.
Prospect of the Year	Tom Gordon	1988	
Prospect of the Year	Alex Rodriguez	1994	
Manager of the Year	Cal Ripken Sr.	1962	
Manager of the Year	Alex Cosmidis	1967	
Manager of the Year	Tom Saffell	1969	
Manager of the Year	Joe Sparks	1971	
Manager of the Year	Gordon Lund	1978	
Manager of the Year	Tom Poquette	1992	
Manager of the Year	Victor Estevez	2024	

=== No-hitters ===
The Timber Rattlers have pitched 14 no-hitters in their franchise history. A no-hit game occurs when a pitcher (or pitchers) allows no hits over the course of a game. A perfect game, a much rarer feat, occurs when no batters reach base by a hit or any other means, such as a walk, hit by pitch, or error. Wisconsin's no-hitters were accomplished by a total of 19 pitchers. Nine were complete games pitched by a lone pitcher, and five were combined no-hitters.

Table key
Score	Game score with Wisconsin runs listed first
(#)	Number of innings in a game that was shorter or longer than 9 innings
£	Pitcher was left-handed

No-hitters
No.	Date	Pitcher(s)	Score	Opponent	Location	Catcher(s)	Ref.
1	July 17, 1962	Alan Riffle^{£}	7–0 (5)	Decatur Commodores	Goodland Field	William Shirah	
2	July 22, 1965	Emmanuel Fitzgerald	4–0 (7)	Quincy Cubs	Q Stadium	Jim Rouse	
3	May 28, 1966	Mickey Abarbanel^{£}	9–1	Wisconsin Rapids Twins	Goodland Field	Robert Von Eps	
4	June 15, 1972	Robert McCauley	2–0 (7)	Quincy Cubs	Goodland Field	Michael Reynolds	
5	August 22, 1975	Larry Monroe	1–0 (7)	Cedar Rapids Giants	Goodland Field	Harris Price	
6	May 26, 1986	John Stein	5–0	Beloit Brewers	Goodland Field	Eric Milholland	
7	July 26, 1990	John Conner (7 IP) Jim Smith (2 IP)	8–0	Wausau Timbers	Goodland Field	Colin Ryan	
8	June 28, 1994	Brett Hinchliffe	13–0	Cedar Rapids Kernels	Veterans Memorial Stadium	Jose Cuellar	
9	April 29, 2000	J. J. Putz	6–1 (7)	Kane County Cougars	Philip B. Elfstrom Stadium	Juan Alcala	
10	August 27, 2001	Derrick Van Dusen^{£}	2–0	Cedar Rapids Kernels	Veterans Memorial Stadium	Ben Hudson	
11	August 24, 2010	Jake Odorizzi (8 IP) Adrian Rosario (1 IP)	3–0	Cedar Rapids Kernels	Veterans Memorial Stadium	Cameron Garfield	
12	May 4, 2012	Chad Thompson (5 IP) Mark Williams (4 IP)	5–0	Clinton LumberKings	Ashford University Field	Rafael Neda	
13	May 29, 2021	Freisis Adames (5 IP) Taylor Floyd (2 IP)	8–1 (7)	Cedar Rapids Kernels	Veterans Memorial Stadium	Kekai Rios (4 Inn.); Nick Kahle (3 Inn.)	
14	June 10, 2021	Justin Bullock (5 IP) Carlos Luna (4 IP)	6–1	South Bend Cubs	Four Winds Field	Nick Kahle	
