= Gomer Hodge =

American baseball player (1944–2007)

- Infielder
- Born: April 3, 1944; Rutherfordton, North Carolina, U.S.
- Died: May 13, 2007 (aged 63); Saluda, North Carolina, U.S.
- Batted: Switch Threw: Right

MLB debut
- April 6, 1971, for the Cleveland Indians

Last MLB appearance
- September 26, 1971, for the Cleveland Indians

MLB statistics
- Batting average: .205
- Games played: 80
- At bats: 83
- Stats at Baseball Reference

Teams
- Cleveland Indians (1971)

Harold Morris "Gomer" Hodge (April 3, 1944 – May 13, 2007) was an American professional baseball player, coach and manager. He appeared in 80 Major League Baseball games primarily as a pinch hitter for the Cleveland Indians in 1971. Born in Rutherfordton, North Carolina, Hodge was signed by the Indians in 1963, and spent the next eight seasons in the minor leagues. He joined the Indians in 1971, hitting four times in his first four at bats and becoming a fan favorite of the team. After a full season with the Indians, he was demoted back to the minor leagues, served as a player-coach for one season and, after retiring as a ballplayer, became a coach in the Indians organization. He then served as a manager and coach for teams in the Milwaukee Brewers, Montreal Expos, and Boston Red Sox organizations until his death in 2007.

== Early life ==
Hodge was born on April 3, 1944, in Rutherfordton, North Carolina. His mother worked at a garment factory, while his father worked at the local textile mill and ran the family farm. His nickname of "Gomer" came from a teammate Bob Wolfe on the Burlington Indians in 1964 due to his resemblance to Jim Nabors, who played the role of Gomer Pyle on television's The Andy Griffith Show and its spinoff Gomer Pyle, U.S.M.C. The nickname stuck with him throughout his career.

== Playing career ==
After being signed by the Cleveland Indians as an amateur free agent in 1963, Hodge began his professional career with the Dubuque Packers. In 80 games with the Packers, he had a .218 batting average. The following year he played with the Burlington Indians, and had a .273 batting average in 127 games. He next played with the Salinas Indians in 1965, and had a .277 batting average and 13 stolen bases in 117 games. In 1966, he was promoted to the Pawtucket Indians of the Eastern League and played there for two seasons. He had a .220 batting average in 114 games in 1966, but only played in 46 games the following year. Hodge then played for the Waterbury Indians in 1968. In 120 games, he had a .231 batting average, eight triples, 13 stolen bases, and was named to the Eastern League All-Star Team as a third baseman. He spent part of 1969 with Waterbury, then was promoted to the Portland Beavers of the Pacific Coast League. In 122 combined games, he had a .287 batting average and 11 home runs. Hodge spent the 1970 season with the Savannah Indians, where he hit .291 with nine home runs, 66 runs batted in, and 13 stolen bases.

Hodge was signed by the Cleveland Indians in 1971 and received an invitation to spring training. During spring training, he was given an endorsement by Indians minor league manager Ray Hathaway, who said of him, "He has more hustle, desire, determination, and fan appeal than any player in our organization." He survived the final day of roster cuts, and made his MLB debut on April 6, hitting a single off Mickey Lolich of the Detroit Tigers in the fifth inning and drove in a run. Two days later, in the Indians' home opener against the Boston Red Sox with the team down 2–0, Hodge pinch hit for second baseman Eddie Leon in the eighth inning, hitting a double, later scoring the Tribe's first run of the game. Hodge replaced Leon in the field and came to bat in the bottom of the ninth inning with two outs and runners on second and third, hitting a single and allowing both baserunners to score, giving the Indians the 3–2 win. On April 11, Hodge pinch hit again and doubled for his fourth consecutive MLB hit to drive in another run. After the game, which gave him four hits in four at bats for the year, he told sportswriters, "Golly, fellas, I'm hitting 4.000," becoming a fan favorite as a result. He followed that up with another game-winning play, a sacrifice fly on April 28 to give the Indians a 3–2 win against the California Angels. He followed that up in May with two game-winning hits in the ninth inning over three days against the New York Yankees. However, he struggled in the second half of the season, finishing the year with a .205 batting average in 80 games played, and was demoted to the Portland Beavers after the season ended.

Entering the 1972 season, Hodge was not invited to spring training, as Indians management felt he needed to work on his fielding to return to the majors, which Hodge felt was unjust since he had been used as a pinch hitter the primary season and was not given the opportunity to field. He spent the season with Portland, where he had a .247 batting average in 116 games. During a period in August of that year, Portland tried him out as a pinch hitter like Cleveland had done the year prior, and he had nine hits in 17 at bats for a .530 average during the experiment.

== Coaching career and later life ==
After spending the winter in the Mexican League, Hodge was named to the Oklahoma City 89ers as a player-coach for the 1973 season. After serving as a coach for Oklahoma City in 1974 and the San Jose Bees in 1975, Hodge was named manager of the San Jose team for the 1976 season. The Bees went 45–95 that year, and Hodge was fired at season's end. In 1981, he was named manager of the Waterloo Indians. The team went 81–55 in his first season, and he was named Manager of the Year for the Midwest League. He served as manager for three more seasons, leading the team to records of 75–64, 76–64, and 65–74, then was named as the Indians' traveling minor league hitting instructor for the 1985 season.

After serving one season in that role, Hodge was named manager of the Beloit Brewers, and served from 1986 to 1988, guiding the team to records of 70–69, 76–64, and 66–74. His last managerial role came in 1995, when he served as the manager for the West Palm Beach Expos, going 54–81 that season. During his time in the Expos organization, he served as a scout, and convinced the organization to sign Vladimir Guerrero. His last job in baseball was as a hitting coach for the Pawtucket Red Sox, and he served in that role through 2001. Hodge died on May 13, 2007, from Lou Gehrig's Disease, and was survived by his wife, Linda, and two children.
