= Terrebonne =

Terrebonne or Terre Bonne (French: good earth) is a name of several places in North America:

== Canada ==
- Terrebonne, Quebec, a suburb of Montreal
  - Terrebonne station, a commuter railway station in Terrebonne, Quebec
  - Terrebonne City Council, the governing body for Terrebonne, Quebec
- Terrebonne County, Quebec, a historical county in Quebec
- Terrebonne (federal electoral district), a Quebec federal electoral district
- Terrebonne (provincial electoral district), a Quebec provincial electoral district
- Terrebonne—Blainville, a former Quebec federal electoral district

== United States ==
- Terrebonne, Minnesota, a former village site in Red Lake County
- Terrebonne, Oregon, a census-designated place notable for its proximity to Smith Rock State Park
- Terrebonne Parish, Louisiana
- Terrebonne Township, Red Lake County, Minnesota
- Terre Bonne, Stamford, Connecticut; a mansion also known as Marion Castle

== See also ==
- Bonne Terre (disambiguation)
