= Terrebonne, Minnesota =

Former community in Minnesota, United States

Terrebonne
- Former community
- Location within Minnesota Location within the United States
- Coordinates: 47°49′57″N 96°08′00″W
- Country: United States
- State: Minnesota
- County: Red Lake
- Elevation: 1,093 ft (333 m)
- Time zone: UTC-6 (Central (CST))
  - Summer (DST): UTC-5 (CDT)
- Area code: 218
- GNIS feature ID: 653098

Terrebonne is an unincorporated community on the Clearwater River in Terrebonne Township, Red Lake County, Minnesota, United States. It is along State Highway 92 (MN 92) and County Road 12.

In 1901, the village of Terrebonne was the site of a thriving flour mill, a cheese factory, a blacksmith shop, a general store and an "eating place", the latter operated by a Mrs. Lajeunesse, in addition to a number of residences. In 1920, the village was reported to have as many as 119 residents. The St. Anthony of Padua Catholic Church, founded in the spring of 1879, was closed in 2000, and burned down on April 29, 2016. The other establishments of the town have long since disappeared. The flour mill burned down in 1915, was rebuilt, and burned down for good on July 4, 1954. The area was settled by farmers who were primarily of French-Canadian descent, and remains at the center of an extremely rural farming community.
