= Terrebonne Township, Red Lake County, Minnesota =

Terrebonne Township, Minnesota
- Township
- Location of Terrebonne Township, within Red Lake County, Minnesota
- Coordinates: 47°48′24″N 96°9′5″W
- Country: United States
- State: Minnesota
- County: Red Lake

Area
  - Total: 36.0 sq mi (93.2 km^{2})
  - Land: 36.0 sq mi (93.2 km^{2})
  - Water: 0 sq mi (0.0 km^{2})
- Elevation: 1,096 ft (334 m)

Population (2020)
  - Total: 145
  - Density: 4.03/sq mi (1.56/km^{2})
- Time zone: UTC-6 (Central (CST))
  - Summer (DST): UTC-5 (CDT)
- FIPS code: 27-64498
- GNIS feature ID: 0665777

Terrebonne Township is a township in Red Lake County, Minnesota, United States. The population was 145 at the 2020 census. The ghost town of Terrebonne is located within the township.

Terrebonne Township was named after Terrebonne, Quebec.

== Geography ==
According to the United States Census Bureau, the township has a total area of 36.0 square miles (93.2 km^{2}), all land.

== Demographics ==
As of the census of 2000, there were 140 people, 59 households, and 37 families residing in the township. The population density was 3.9 people per square mile (1.5/km^{2}). There were 65 housing units at an average density of 1.8/sq mi (0.7/km^{2}). The racial makeup of the township was 100.00% White.

There were 59 households, out of which 23.7% had children under the age of 18 living with them, 55.9% were married couples living together, 8.5% had a female householder with no husband present, and 35.6% were non-families. 27.1% of all households were made up of individuals, and 15.3% had someone living alone who was 65 years of age or older. The average household size was 2.37 and the average family size was 2.95.

In the township the population was spread out, with 24.3% under the age of 18, 5.7% from 18 to 24, 27.1% from 25 to 44, 20.7% from 45 to 64, and 22.1% who were 65 years of age or older. The median age was 40 years. For every 100 females, there were 109.0 males. For every 100 females age 18 and over, there were 107.8 males.

The median income for a household in the township was $34,375, and the median income for a family was $44,688. Males had a median income of $31,875 versus $28,750 for females. The per capita income for the township was $13,924. There were 6.5% of families and 8.6% of the population living below the poverty line, including no under eighteens and 22.2% of those over 64.
