= Woody Smith =

Baseball player and coach

Forest Elwood "Woody" Smith (February 25, 1927, in University City, Missouri – February 4, 2005) was an American baseball figure who spent 18 seasons playing in the minor leagues and another 12 managing at that level.

A third baseman, Smith played from 1946 to 1962 and again in 1969. Though his statistical record is incomplete, it is known that he collected at least 1,755 hits in his career - with at least 342 being doubles, 43 being triples and 130 being home runs. In 1951, he had perhaps his best season when he hit .320 with 30 doubles, six triples, three home runs and 162 hits for the West Palm Beach Indians.

He spent 1957 with the Miami Marlins of the International League, where he, Pancho Herrera, Mickey Micelotta, and Pancho Herrera were considered to be one of the best infields in the International League, with one writer saying, "they make plays the Phillies couldn't make." In October 1957, he was purchased by the Philadelphia Phillies to be placed on their roster, however he never appeared in the major leagues with them.

Smith began his managerial career in 1969 as skipper of the Miami Marlins, heading them until 1970. He then skippered the Miami Orioles until 1972. Each of the teams he managed in his first four seasons ended up becoming league champions.

In 1973, Smith managed the Key West Conchs. He skippered the San Antonio Missions in 1974 and 1975. Though he did not manage in 1976, he returned in 1977, managing the Waterloo Indians. That year, he led them to the league finals, which they lost, and in 1978 he led them to the playoffs, though they did not get past the first round. From 1979 to 1981, he managed the Chattanooga Lookouts.
