= Edward Goodland =

English cricketer

Personal information
- Full name: Edward Stanley Goodland
- Born: 22 September 1883; Taunton, Somerset, England
- Died: 12 January 1974 (aged 90); Bristol, England
- Batting: Right-handed
- Role: Batsman

Domestic team information
- Years: Team
- 1908–09: Somerset
- First-class debut: 28 May 1908 Somerset v Worcestershire
- Last First-class: 2 June 1909 Somerset v Gloucestershire

Career statistics
Competition	First-class
Matches	4
Runs scored	47
Batting average	9.40
100s/50s	–/–
Top score	42*
Balls bowled	–
Wickets	–
Bowling average	–
5 wickets in innings	–
10 wickets in match	–
Best bowling	–
Catches/stumpings	2/–
- Source: CricketArchive, 8 February 2011

Edward Stanley Goodland (22 September 1883 – 12 January 1974) played first-class cricket for Somerset in 1908 and 1909. He was born at Taunton, Somerset and died at Bristol.

Goodland was a member of a prominent Taunton family involved in the coal trade and in bringing coal to the town by water through improvements to the navigation on the River Tone and the Bridgwater and Taunton Canal. The family name is preserved in Taunton in Goodland Gardens, a park. Edward Goodland was educated at Taunton School where he was captain of both the cricket and football teams. As a first-class cricketer, he was a right-handed lower-order batsman. He made an unbeaten 42 in his first first-class innings, in the match against Worcestershire at Taunton in 1908. But in five other innings, he made only five further runs.

In the First World War, Goodland joined the territorial battalion of the Somerset Light Infantry and was promoted from second lieutenant to full lieutenant in 1916. The same year he was transferred to the East Kent Regiment as a temporary captain. By April 1917, when he was formally promoted to captain, he had been awarded the Military Cross and was back with the Somerset Light Infantry. He was appointed adjutant to the Somerset Light Infantry in November 1917, and in this role he was further promoted to acting Major in July 1918 and second-in-command of the 5th battalion of the regiment. He left these posts when the territorial battalions were returned to civilian life in 1920 and finally left the army in 1933 with the rank of major when he reached the upper age limit.

In civilian life, he was one of the six employees who were left in charge of the antique furniture and jewellery company Mallett & Son by the company founder in 1930, and he became both chairman and managing director. Mallett had offices in New Bond Street, London and in Bath where it had been founded, but the Bath premises at The Octagon were abandoned in the 1930s and the company has since concentrated on Bond Street and in New York.
