= Nienhaus Field =

Sports complex in Appleton, Wisconsin, U.S.

Coordinates: 44°15′28″N 88°25′47″W

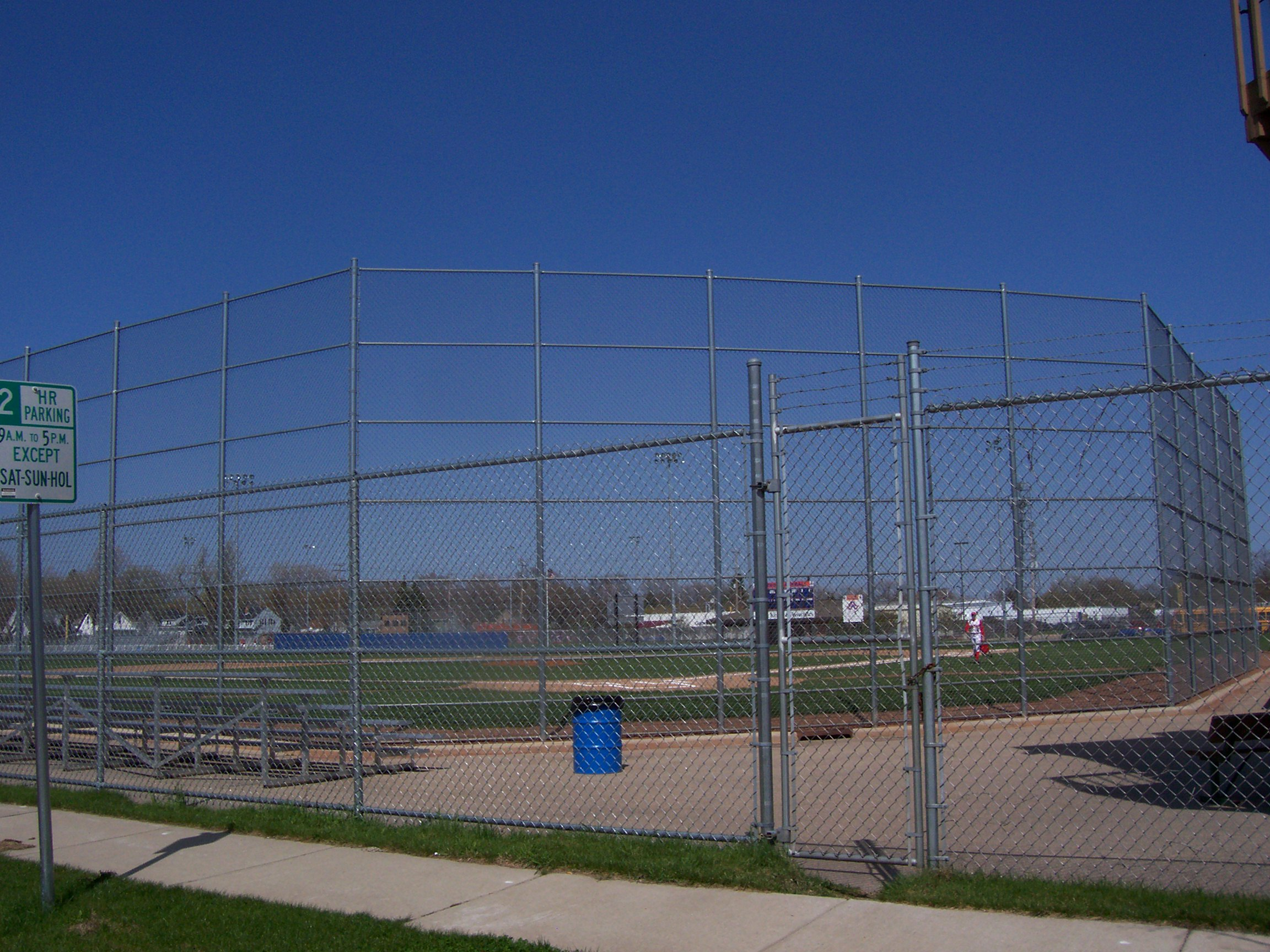
Sports complex at the site of Nienhaus Field, taken in 2008

Nienhaus Field, formally Goodland Field, is a sports park in Appleton, Wisconsin. It was originally named after Appleton mayor John Goodland.

== History ==
The ballpark opened in 1940 as the Spencer Street Athletic Field and was primarily used for baseball. The first team to play in the stadium was the Appleton Papermakers, who played there from 1940 to 1942 and from 1946 to 1953. The primary team to play at the field, however, was the Appleton Foxes, a minor league baseball team that played there from 1958 until August 29, 1994. The team then moved to Fox Cities Stadium, becoming the Wisconsin Timber Rattlers in the 1995 season. The season attendance the last seven years at Goodland Field (1988-94) ranged from 46,576 to 85,310, while the season attendance the first seven years at Fox Cities Stadium ranged from 207,823 to 233,797.

Goodland Field was taken over by the Appleton Area School District, which converted the site into a sports complex and renamed it Nienhaus Field after Appleton West High School teacher and successful coach and 1994 Wisconsin State Golf Hall of Fame member, Mary Beth Nienhaus. Nienhaus Field is used regularly by Appleton West baseball and softball teams, as well as a number of area baseball, softball, and soccer teams, including The Appleton Legends.

Goodland Field's most famous player may have been New York Yankees third baseman Alex Rodriguez, who played a short time in the venue's final season, 1994. Philadelphia Phillies pitcher Tom Gordon also played for the Foxes, between the time he was drafted in 1986 and when he was called up to the majors in 1988.
