= Roger Goodland =

British bibliographer and author

Roger Goodland (June 1880 – December 1944) was a British author and bibliographer best known for his 1931 annotated bibliography of literature concerning sexual rites, customs and their religious and anthropological aspects.

== Life ==
Roger Goodland was born in Taunton, Somerset in June 1880. His father was Charles Goodland (1845–1924) from Taunton, his mother Kate (1845–1921) was born in Montréal, Canada. It is known that Roger Goodland lived in Canada for an extended period of time and served in the Somerset Light Infantry during World War I.

After his return to England, he became a fellow of the Royal Anthropological Institute of Great Britain and Ireland in 1925.

Goodland died in December 1944 and is buried at St. James Cemetery, Somerset, England.

== A Bibliography of Sex Rites and Customs ==
Goodland's principal work was A Bibliography of Sex Rites and Customs: An Annotated Record of Books, Articles and Illustrations in All Languages, published in London by George Routledge & Sons in 1931. The bibliography comprises 752 pages and contains and index of approximately 9,000 works concerned with sexual rituals and customs. The entries are arranged alphabetically by author and are supplemented by a substantial subject index. Goodland also provided brief indications of the subjects covered by individual works and page references to the relevant topics. The bibliography covered subjects including phallicism and religious aspects of sex.

=== Reception ===
The book received contemporary attention in several scholarly journals. The contemporary review in Nature described it as a "monumental work" in which "a high standard of accuracy is maintained". The reviewer assumed that Goodland had spent between fifteen and twenty years compiling the bibliography.

It was reviewed by E. W. Gifford in the 1932 volume of American Anthropologist. It was also reviewed in the Journal of the Royal Asiatic Society in 1932 and in the Journal of American Folklore in 1933.

Reprints of the book were published by AMS Press in 1974 and by Longwood Press in 1977.

== Bibliography ==
- Goodland, Roger. A Bibliography of Sex Rites and Customs: An Annotated Record of Books, Articles and Illustrations in All Languages. London: George Routledge & Sons, 1931. 752 pp.
