= Waterloo Indians =

Professional minor-league baseball team in Waterloo, Iowa (1977–1988)

The Waterloo Indians were a minor league baseball team that played from 1977 to 1988 in the Midwest League, winning the league championship in 1980 and 1986. They played their home games at Riverfront Stadium and were affiliated with the Cleveland Indians. They were located in Waterloo, Iowa.

== Year-by-year record ==
Year	Record	Finish	Manager	Playoffs
1977	80-58	1st	Woody Smith	Lost League Finals
1978	91-46	2nd	Woody Smith	Lost in 1st round
1979	81-54	1st	Cal Emery	Lost League Finals
1980	86-55	1st	Cal Emery	League Champs
1981	81-55	2nd	Gomer Hodge	Lost in 1st round
1982	75-64	5th	Gomer Hodge	
1983	76-64	3rd (t)	Gomer Hodge	Lost in 1st round
1984	65-74	9th	Gomer Hodge	
1985	67-73	7th	Steve Swisher	
1986	78-62	3rd	Steve Swisher	League Champs
1987	72-68	5th	Glenn Adams	
1988	78-62	5th (t)	Ken Bolek	
