= List of Midwest League stadiums =

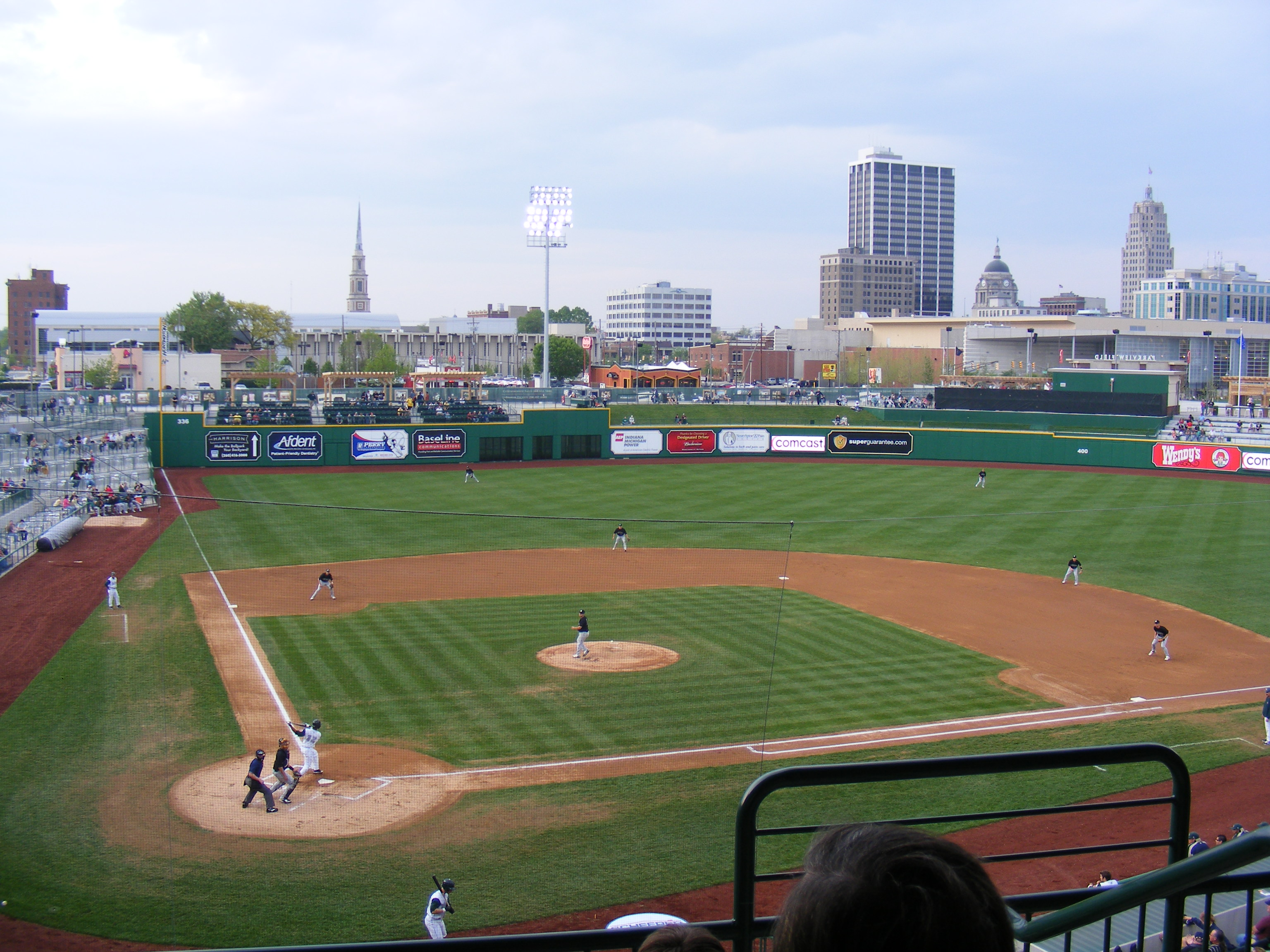
Parkview Field was built in 2009 and is home to the Fort Wayne TinCaps.

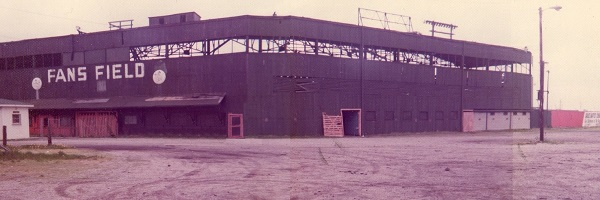
Fans Field, shown here in 1975 shortly before demolition, was the former home of the Decatur Commodores.

There are twelve stadiums in use by Midwest League (MWL) baseball teams. The oldest stadium is Modern Woodmen Park (1931) in Davenport, Iowa, home of the Quad Cities River Bandits. The newest stadium is ABC Supply Stadium (2021) in Beloit, Wisconsin, home of the Beloit Sky Carp. One stadium was built in each of the 1930s and 1980s, three in the 1990s, six in the 2000s, and one in the 2020s. The highest seating capacity is 11,000 at Jackson Field in Lansing, Michigan, where the Lansing Lugnuts play. The lowest capacity is 3,850 at ABC Supply Stadium.

Since its founding in 1947, there have been approximately 50 stadiums located among over 40 municipalities used by the league, including the periods when it was known as the Illinois State League (1947–1948) and the Mississippi–Ohio Valley League (1949–1955). Of the stadiums with known opening dates, the oldest to have hosted MWL games was then-Municipal Park (1914) in Dubuque, Iowa, home of the Dubuque Packers/Royals and Midwest Dodgers. ABC Supply Stadium (2021) is also the newest among all MWL stadiums. The highest known seating capacity is 11,000 at Jackson Field. The stadium with the lowest known capacity was Laker Stadium, home of the Paris Lakers, which seated only 600.

== Active stadiums ==
Name	Team	City	State	Opened	Capacity	Ref.
Day Air Ballpark	Dayton Dragons	Dayton	Ohio	2000	7,230	
Parkview Field	Fort Wayne TinCaps	Fort Wayne	Indiana	2009	8,100	
Dow Diamond	Great Lakes Loons	Midland	Michigan	2007	5,200	
Classic Auto Group Park	Lake County Captains	Eastlake	Ohio	2003	7,273	
Jackson Field	Lansing Lugnuts	Lansing	Michigan	1996	11,000	
LMCU Ballpark	West Michigan Whitecaps	Comstock Park	Michigan	1994	9,281	
ABC Supply Stadium	Beloit Sky Carp	Beloit	Wisconsin	2021	3,850	
Veterans Memorial Stadium	Cedar Rapids Kernels	Cedar Rapids	Iowa	2002	5,300	
Dozer Park	Peoria Chiefs	Peoria	Illinois	2002	8,500	
Modern Woodmen Park	Quad Cities River Bandits	Davenport	Iowa	1931	7,140	
Four Winds Field at Coveleski Stadium	South Bend Cubs	South Bend	Indiana	1987	10,500	
Neuroscience Group Field at Fox Cities Stadium	Wisconsin Timber Rattlers	Appleton	Wisconsin	1995	5,900	

=== Map ===
Current stadium locations:
- East Division
- West Division

=== Gallery ===
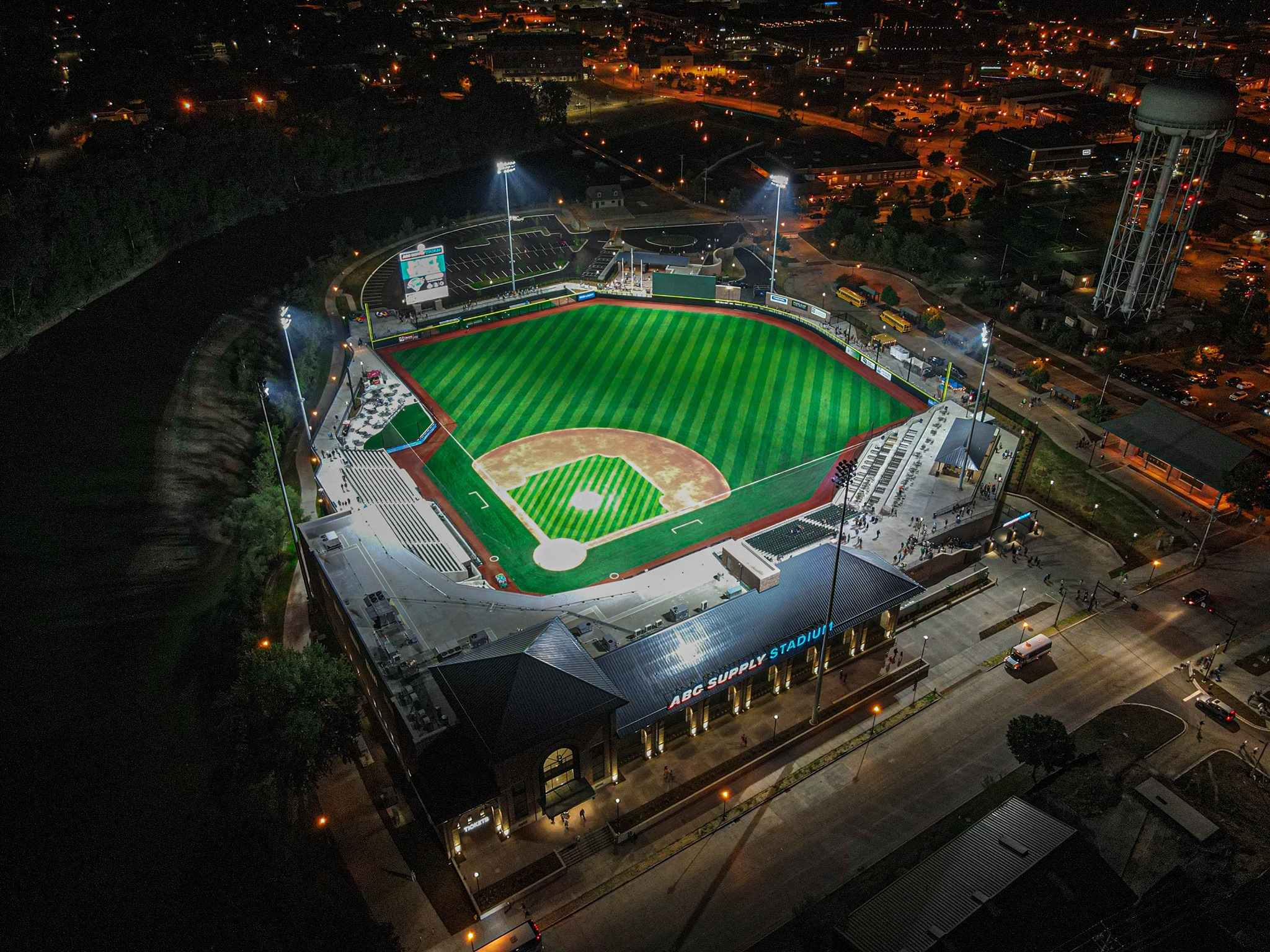
ABC Supply Stadium (Beloit Sky Carp)

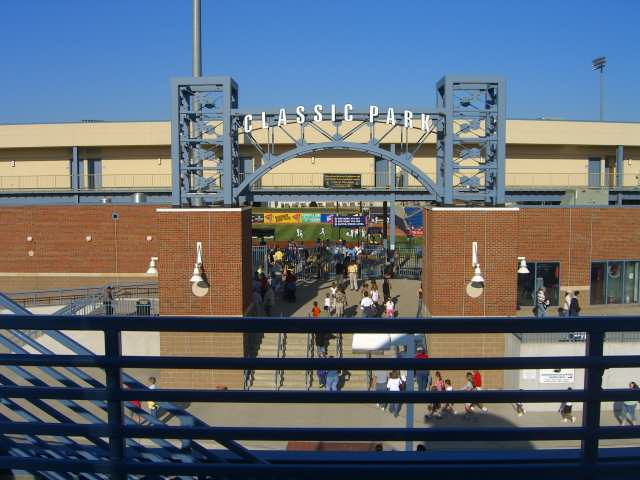
Classic Auto Group Park (Lake County Captains)

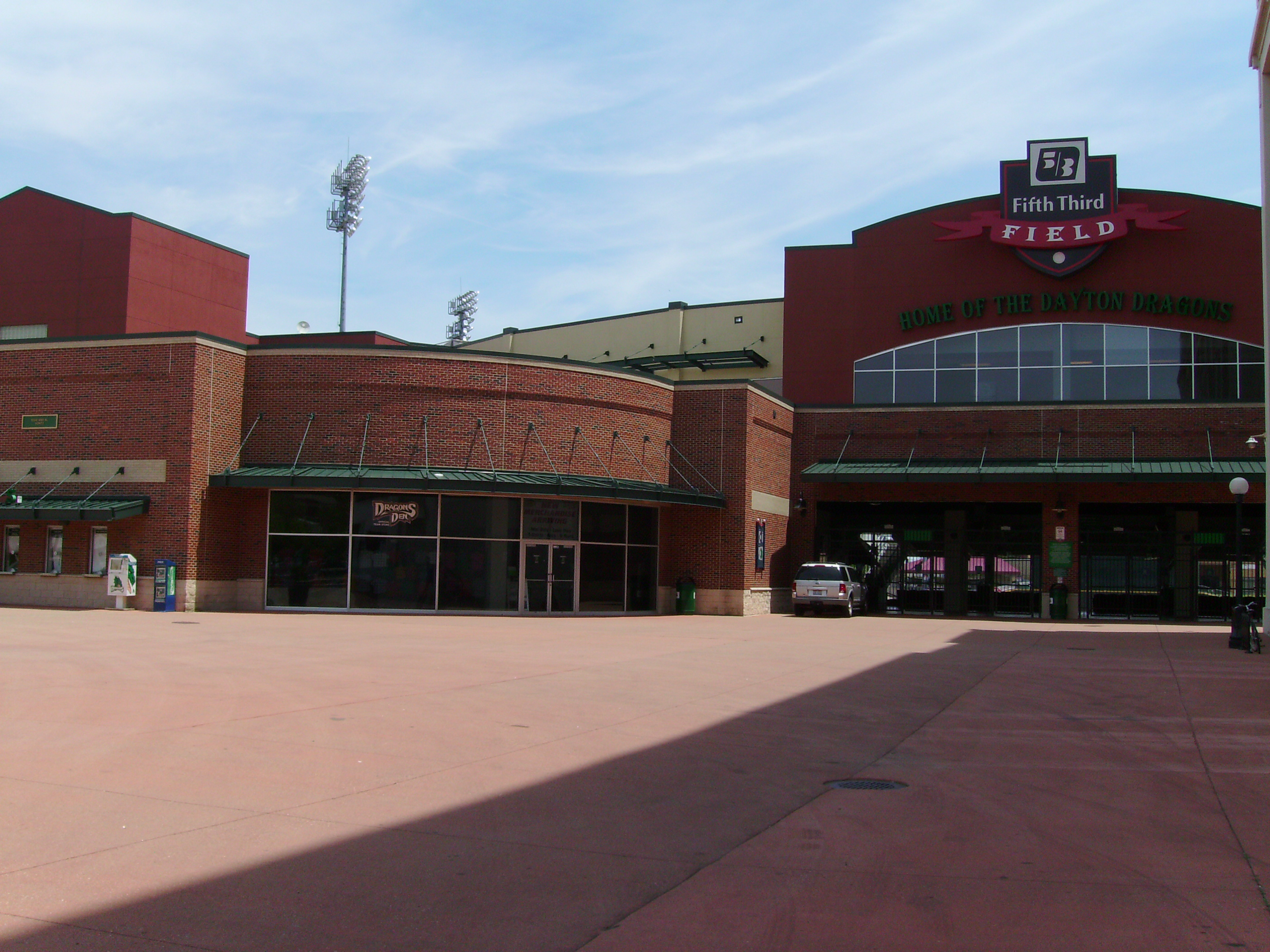
Day Air Ballpark (Dayton Dragons)

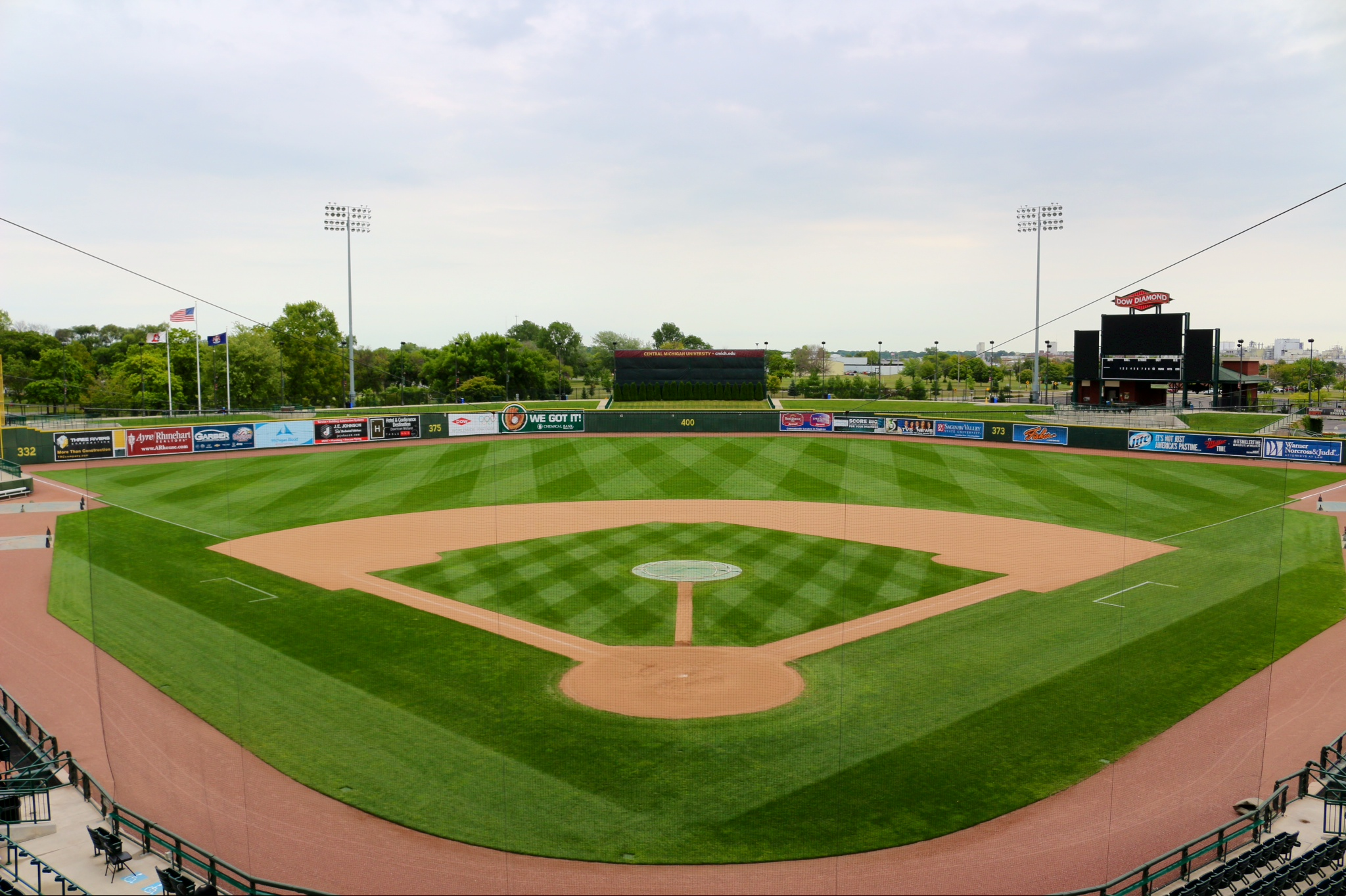
Dow Diamond (Great Lakes Loons)

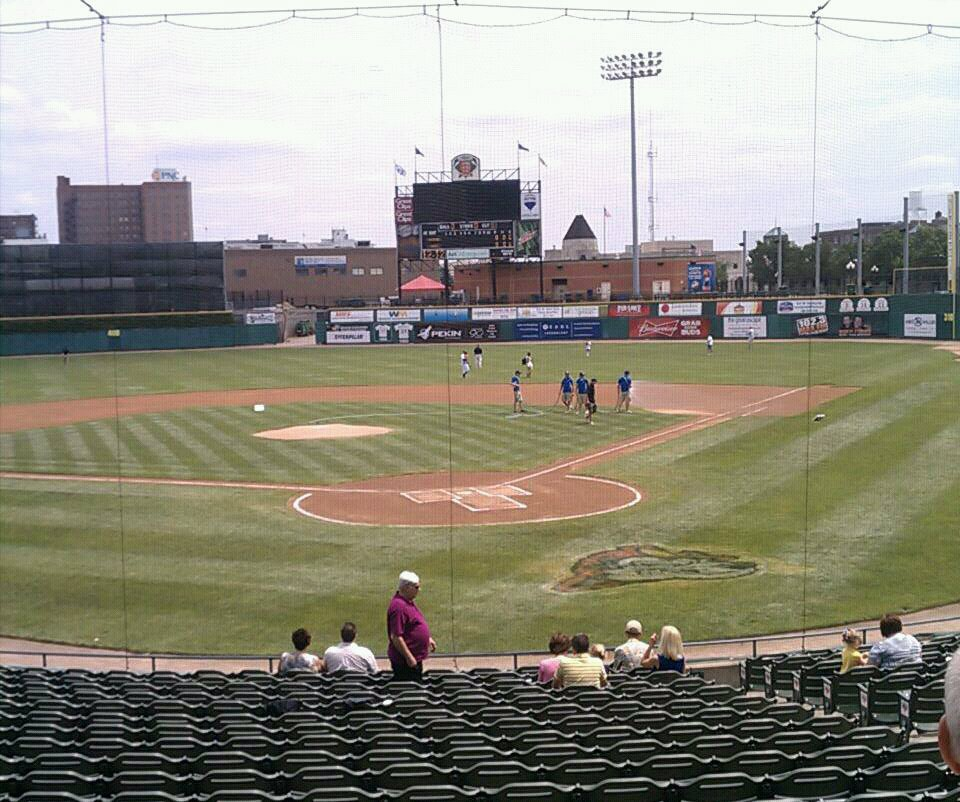
Dozer Park (Peoria Chiefs)

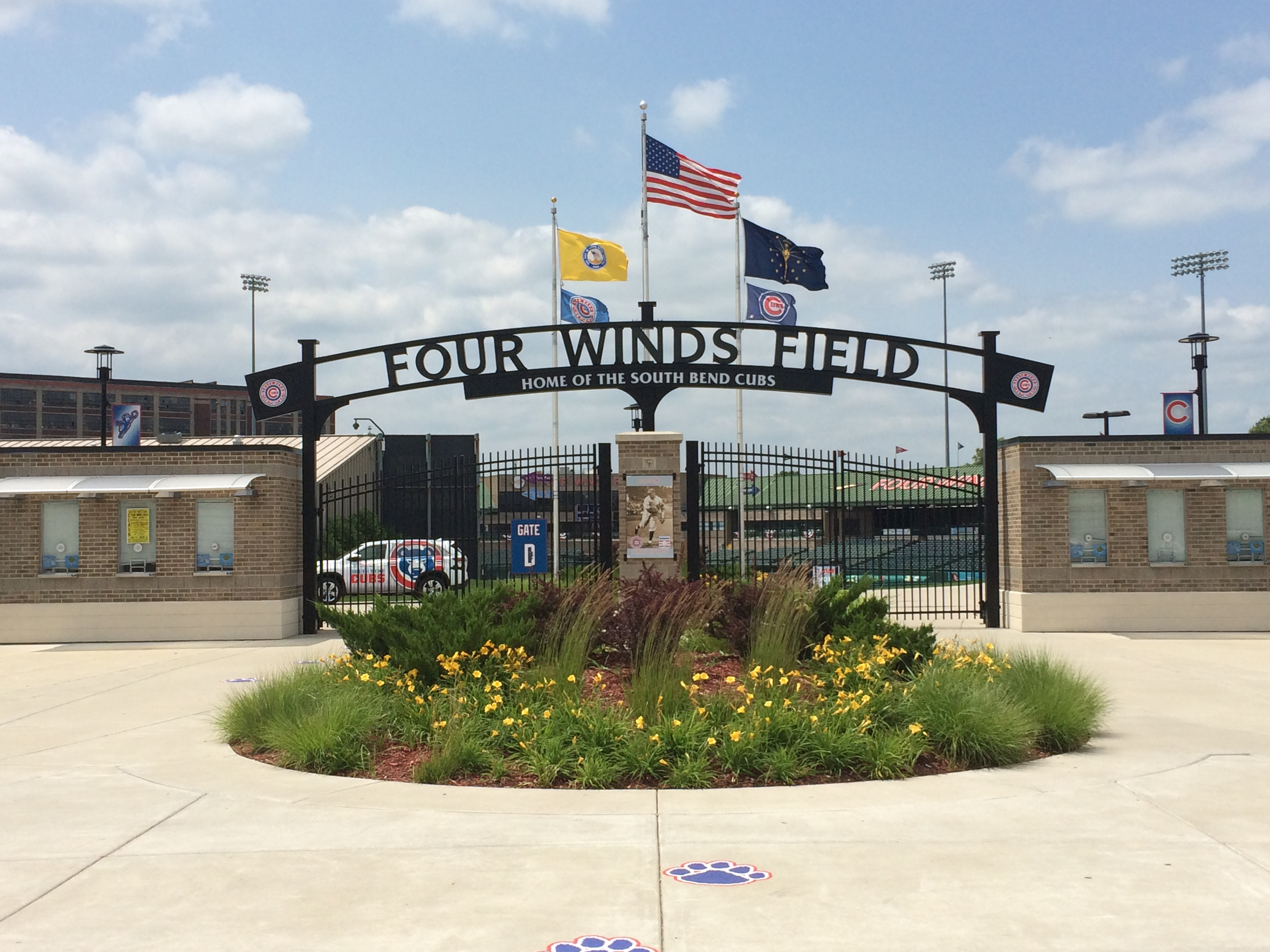
Four Winds Field at Coveleski Stadium (South Bend Cubs)

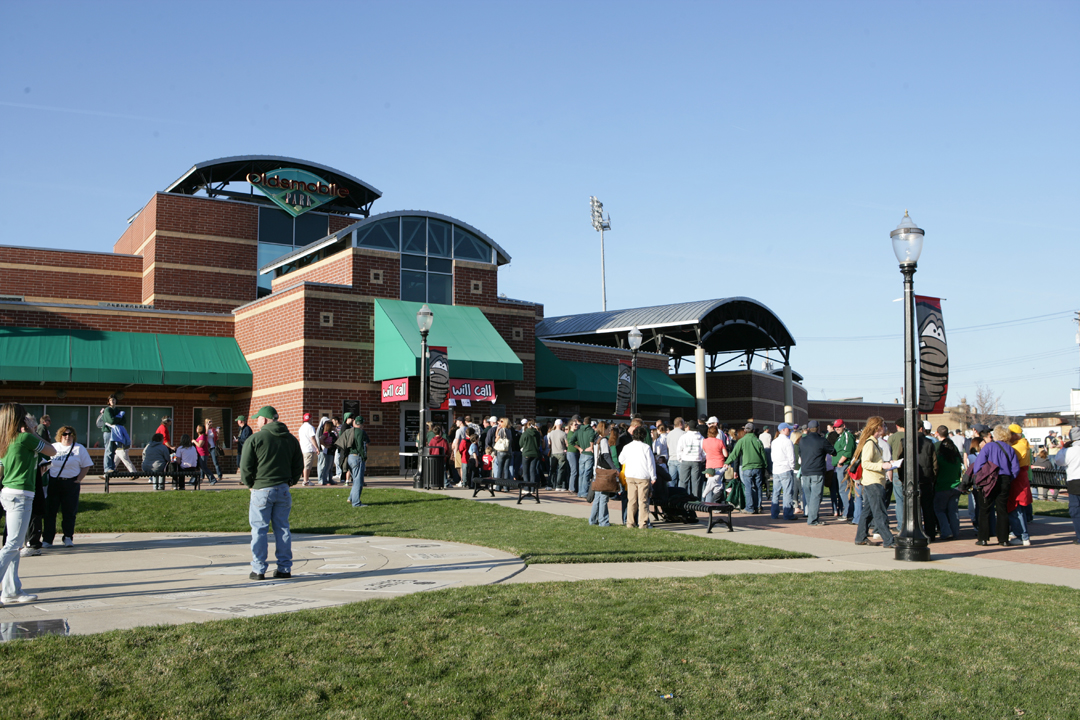
Jackson Field (Lansing Lugnuts)

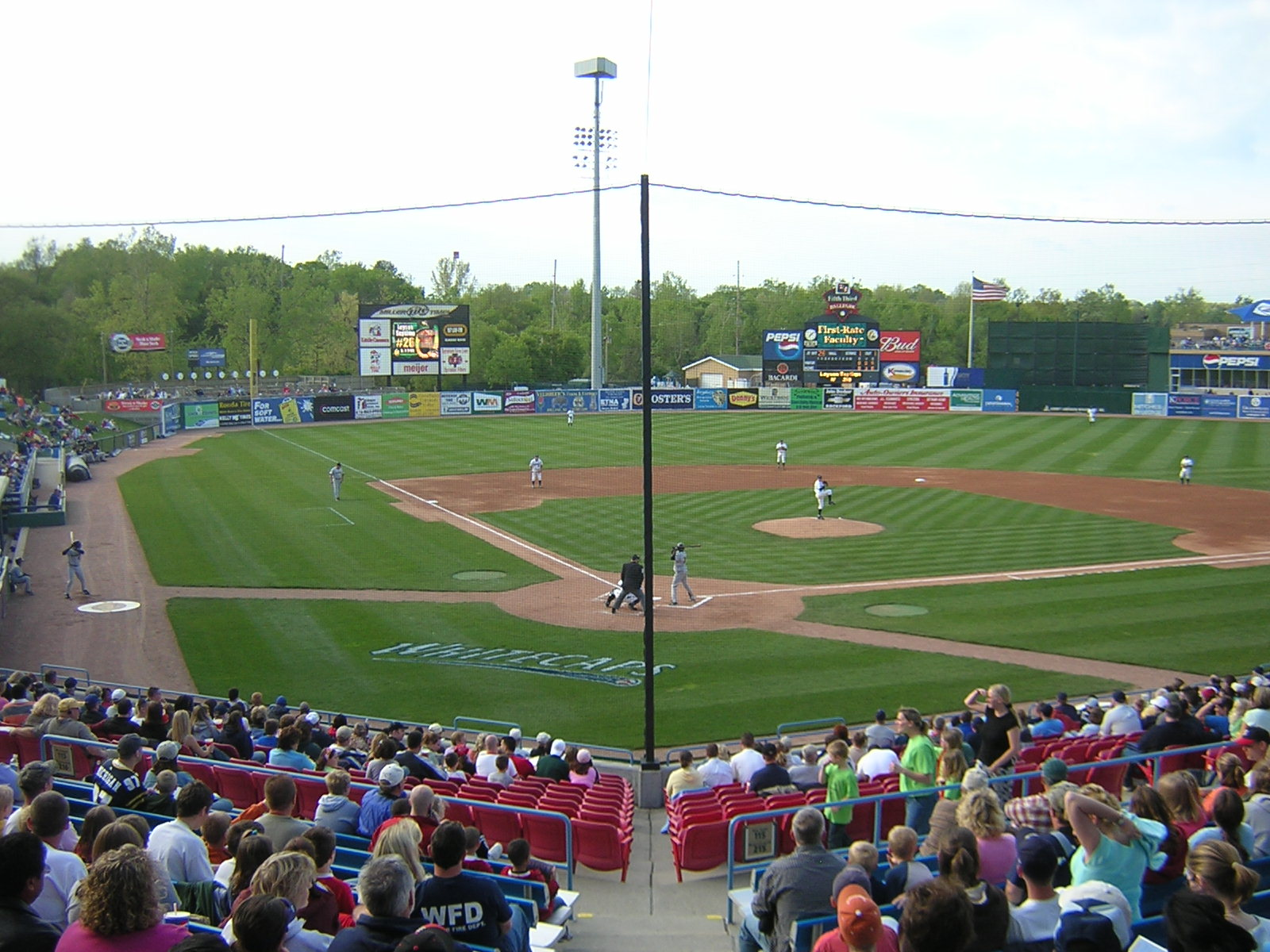
LMCU Ballpark (West Michigan Whitecaps)

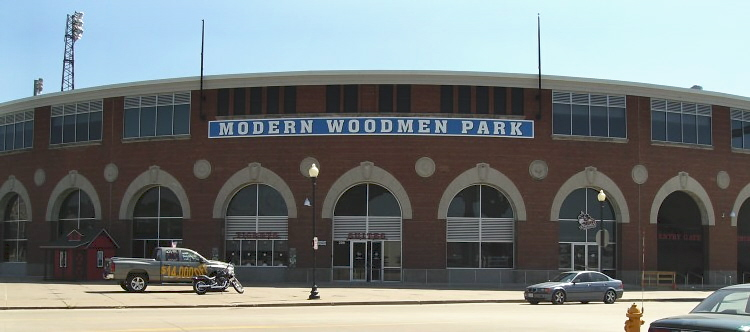
Modern Woodmen Park (Quad Cities River Bandits)

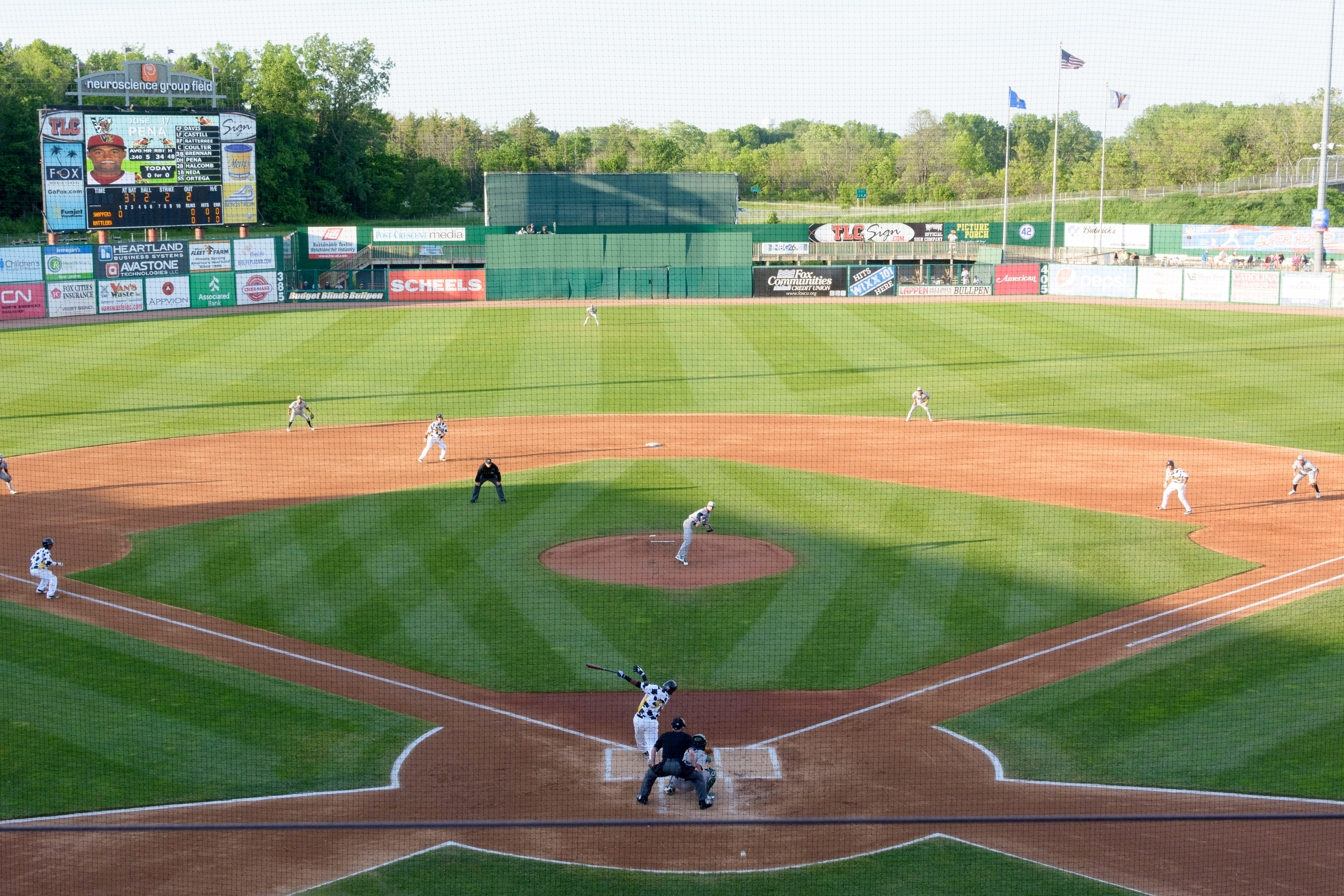
Neuroscience Group Field at Fox Cities Stadium (Wisconsin Timber Rattlers)

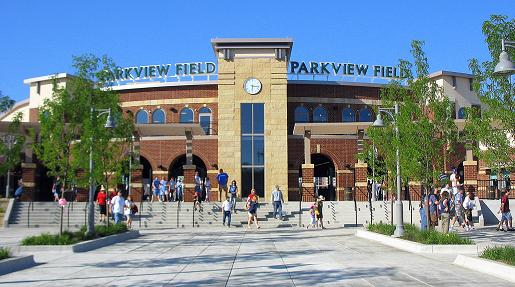
Parkview Field (Fort Wayne TinCaps)

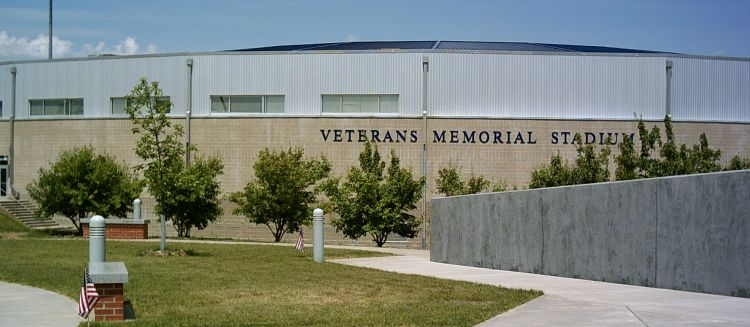
Veterans Memorial Stadium (Cedar Rapids Kernels)

== All stadiums ==
Key
Name	Stadium's name in its last season of hosting MWL baseball
Opened	Opening of earliest stadium variant used for hosting MWL baseball
Capacity	Stadium's most recent capacity while hosting MWL baseball

Name	Team(s)	Locality	State	Opened	Capacity	Ref(s)
Goodland Field (Note: Goodland Field was originally known as Spencer Street Athletic Field.)	Appleton/Fox Cities Foxes	Appleton	Wisconsin	1937	4,300	
C.O. Brown Stadium	Michigan Battle Cats, Battle Creek Yankees, Southwest Michigan Devil Rays	Battle Creek	Michigan		4,500	
Belleville Athletic Field	Belleville Stags	Belleville	Illinois		2,500	
Harry C. Pohlman Field (Note: Harry C. Pohlman Field was known as Telfer Park (1982–1986).)	Beloit Brewers/Snappers (Note: The Beloit Snappers began play of the 2021 season at Harry C. Pohlman Field until the opening of ABC Supply Stadium on August 3.)	Beloit	Wisconsin		3,501	
ABC Supply Stadium	Beloit Snappers/Sky Carp	Beloit	Wisconsin	2021	3,850	
Bowling Green Baseball Park	Bowling Green Hot Rods	Bowling Green	Kentucky		4,559	
Community Field	Burlington Bees/Rangers/Expos/Braves/Astros	Burlington	Iowa		3,200	
Veterans Memorial Stadium (Old)	Cedar Rapids Red Raiders/Cardinals/Astros/Giants/Reds/Kernels	Cedar Rapids	Iowa		6,000	
Veterans Memorial Stadium (New)	Cedar Rapids Kernels	Cedar Rapids	Iowa	2002	5,300	
Fans Field	Centralia Cubs, Centralia Sterlings, Centralia Zeros	Centralia	Illinois		2,400	
Alliant Energy Field (Note: Alliant Energy Field was known as Riverview Stadium (1937–2001).)	Clinton Pirates/C-Sox/Pilots/Dodgers/Giants/LumberKings	Clinton	Iowa	1937	4,000	
Danville Stadium (Note: Danville Stadium was known as Recreation Field (1946–1971).)	Danville Dans/Warriors/Dodgers/Suns	Danville	Illinois		5,700	
John O'Donnell Stadium (Note: John O'Donnell Stadium was known as Municipal Stadium (1931–1969).) (Note: John O'Donnell Stadium was completely renovated in 2004 and is sometimes referred to as "John O'Donnell Stadium II". It has been known as Modern Woodmen Park since 2008.)	Davenport Braves, Swing of the Quad Cities, Quad Cities Braves/Angels/Cubs/River Bandits	Davenport	Iowa	1931	7,140	
Day Air Ballpark (Note: Day Air Ballpark is also known as Fifth Third Field.)	Dayton Dragons	Dayton	Ohio	2000	7,230	
Fans Field	Decatur Commodores	Decatur	Illinois		5,200	
John Patrakis Memorial Park (Note: John Patrakis Memorial Park was known as Municipal Park (1914–1932).)	Dubuque Packers/Royals, Midwest Dodgers (Note: The Midwest Dodgers started the 1962 season as the Keokuk Dodgers and moved from Keokuk, Iowa, after being surrendered to the Midwest League on August 7.)	Dubuque	Iowa	1914	3,500	
Parkview Field	Fort Wayne TinCaps	Fort Wayne	Indiana	2009	8,100	
Memorial Stadium	Fort Wayne Wizards	Fort Wayne	Indiana		6,516	
Dow Diamond	Great Lakes Loons	Midland	Michigan	2007	5,200	
Clemens Field	Hannibal Stags/Cardinals/Citizens	Hannibal	Missouri	1925	2,000	
Philip Elfstrom Stadium (Note: Philip Elfstrom Stadium is also known as Cougar Stadium.)	Kane County Cougars	Geneva	Illinois		7,400	
Simmons Park	Kenosha Twins	Kenosha	Wisconsin	1920	3,500	
Joyce Park (Note: Joyce Park was known as Keokuk Baseball Park (1926–1933).)	Keokuk Cardinals/Dodgers (Note: The Keokuk Dodgers were surrendered to the Midwest League on August 7, 1962, moved to Dubuque, Iowa, and renamed the Midwest Dodgers.)	Keokuk	Iowa		2,500	
Highland Park Stadium	Kokomo Giants/Dodgers	Kokomo	Indiana		7,000	
Columbian Park (Note: Columbian Park is also known as Loeb Stadium.)	Lafayette Chiefs/Red Sox	Lafayette	Indiana	1937	5,000	
Classic Park	Lake County Captains	Eastlake	Ohio	2003	7,273	
Oldsmobile Park	Lansing Lugnuts	Lansing	Michigan	1996	11,000	
Warner Park	Madison Muskies, Madison Hatters	Madison	Wisconsin		4,000	
Breese Stevens Field	Madison Muskies	Madison	Wisconsin	1925	5,000	
City Park	Marion Indians	Marion	Illinois		600	
Mattoon Baseball Park	Mattoon Indians/Phillies/Athletics	Mattoon	Illinois		2,000	
Ames Field	Michigan City White Caps	Michigan City, Indiana	Indiana		3,700	
Veterans Park (Note: Veterans Park was known as Vernon Field (1947–1948) and Bob Strothman Baseball Park.)	Mount Vernon Braves/Kings	Mount Vernon	Illinois		2,000	
Brooks Stadium	Paducah Chiefs	Paducah	Kentucky		3,500	
Laker Stadium (Note: Laker Stadium was known as Twin Lakes Park (1950–1951).)	Paris Lakers	Paris	Illinois		1,500	
Pete Vonachen Stadium (Note: Pete Vonachen Stadium was known as Meinen Field (1969–1991).)	Peoria Suns/Chiefs	Peoria	Illinois		5,200	
Dozer Park (Note: Dozer Park is also known as O'Brien Field.)	Peoria Chiefs	Peoria	Illinois	2002	8,500	
Q-Stadium	Quincy Gems/Giants, Quincy Jets, Quincy Cubs	Quincy	Illinois	1938	2,500	
Marinelli Stadium	Rockford Expos/Royals/Cubbies/Reds	Rockford	Illinois	1988	4,200	
Stanley Coveleski Regional Stadium	South Bend White Sox/Silver Hawks/Cubs	South Bend, Indiana	Indiana	1987	10,500	
Jim Fitzpatrick Memorial Stadium	Springfield Giants	Springfield	Illinois		4,500	
Robin Roberts Stadium at Lanphier Park	Springfield Cardinals/Sultans	Springfield	Illinois	1925	5,000	
Nehi Park	Vincennes Citizens/Velvets (Note: The Vincennes Velvets transferred to Canton, Illinois, to become the Canton Citizens on June 7, 1952.)	Vincennes	Indiana		2,000	
Memorial Stadium	Canton Citizens (Note: The Canton Citizens were formed when the Vincennes Velvets transferred from Vincennes, Indiana, on June 7, 1952.)	Canton	Illinois			
Municipal Stadium (Note: Municipal Stadium is also known as Riverfront Stadium.)	Waterloo Hawks/Royals, Waterloo Indians, Waterloo Diamonds	Waterloo	Iowa	1946	4,800	
Athletic Park	Wausau Mets/Timbers	Wausau	Wisconsin		2,500	
Memorial Stadium	West Frankfort Cardinals	West Frankfort	Illinois		2,500	
Fifth Third Ballpark (Note: Fifth Third Ballpark was known as Old Kent Park (1994–2001).)	West Michigan Whitecaps	Comstock Park	Michigan	1994	9,281	
Witter Field (Note: Witter Field is also known as Witter Athletic Park.)	Wisconsin Rapids Senators/Twins	Wisconsin Rapids	Wisconsin		3,000	
Neuroscience Group Field at Fox Cities Stadium (Note: Neuroscience Group Field at Fox Cities Stadium was known as Time Warner Cable Field at Fox Cities Stadium (2007–2013) and Fox Cities Stadium (1995–2007).)	Wisconsin Timber Rattlers	Appleton	Wisconsin	1995	5,900	

=== Map ===
Midwest League stadium locations

== See also ==
- List of High-A baseball stadiums
- List of Northwest League stadiums
- List of South Atlantic League stadiums
- List of Midwest League teams
