= List of Midwest League teams =

Minor League Realignment

The Midwest League was formed in 1956, from the Mississippi–Ohio Valley League, which existed from 1947–1955. It primarily serves the Midwestern United States. It was a Class A level league from 1956–2020. In 2021, it became a High-A league as part of the Minor League restructuring by Major League Baseball. During the 2021 season, the league operated as the High-A Central before switching back to its previous moniker in 2022. Over the league's 70-season span, its teams relocated, changed names, transferred to different leagues, or ceased operations altogether. This list documents teams which played in the league.

== Teams ==
Key
Team name (#)	A number following a team's name indicates multiple iterations of the team in chronological order.

Team	First season	Last season	City	Fate
Appleton Foxes (1)	1962	1962	Appleton, Wisconsin	Renamed the Fox Cities Foxes
Appleton Foxes (2)	1967	1994	Appleton, Wisconsin	Renamed the Wisconsin Timber Rattlers
Battle Creek Yankees	2003	2004	Battle Creek, Michigan	Renamed the Southwest Michigan Devil Rays
Beloit Brewers	1982	1994	Beloit, Wisconsin	Renamed the Beloit Snappers
Beloit Sky Carp	2022	–	Beloit, Wisconsin	Active
Beloit Snappers	1995	2021	Beloit, Wisconsin	Renamed the Beloit Sky Carp
Bowling Green Hot Rods (Note: The Bowling Green Hot Rods, Burlington Bees (2), Clinton LumberKings, and Kane County Cougars all last played in the league during the 2019 season, since the 2020 season was cancelled due to the COVID-19 pandemic.)	2010	2020	Bowling Green, Kentucky	Transferred to the South Atlantic League
Burlington Astros	1991	1992	Burlington, Iowa	Renamed the Burlington Bees
Burlington Bees (1)	1962	1981	Burlington, Iowa	Renamed the Burlington Rangers
Burlington Bees (2)	1993	2020	Burlington, Iowa	Transferred to the Prospect League
Burlington Braves	1988	1990	Burlington, Iowa	Renamed the Burlington Astros
Burlington Expos	1986	1987	Burlington, Iowa	Renamed the Burlington Braves
Burlington Rangers	1982	1985	Burlington, Iowa	Renamed the Burlington Expos
Cedar Rapids Astros	1973	1974	Cedar Rapids, Iowa	Renamed the Cedar Rapids Giants
Cedar Rapids Cardinals	1965	1972	Cedar Rapids, Iowa	Renamed the Cedar Rapids Astros
Cedar Rapids Giants	1975	1979	Cedar Rapids, Iowa	Renamed the Cedar Rapids Reds
Cedar Rapids Kernels	1993	–	Cedar Rapids, Iowa	Active
Cedar Rapids Red Raiders	1962	1964	Cedar Rapids, Iowa	Renamed the Cedar Rapids Cardinals
Cedar Rapids Reds	1980	1992	Cedar Rapids, Iowa	Renamed the Cedar Rapids Kernels
Clinton C-Sox	1960	1965	Clinton, Iowa	Renamed the Clinton Pilots
Clinton Dodgers	1977	1979	Clinton, Iowa	Renamed the Clinton Giants
Clinton Giants	1980	1993	Clinton, Iowa	Renamed the Clinton LumberKings
Clinton LumberKings	1994	2020	Clinton, Iowa	Transferred to the Prospect League
Clinton Pilots	1966	1976	Clinton, Iowa	Renamed the Clinton Dodgers
Clinton Pirates	1956	1959	Clinton, Iowa	Renamed the Clinton C-Sox
Danville Suns	1982	1982	Danville, Illinois	Relocated to Peoria, Illinois as the Peoria Suns
Danville Warriors	1970	1976	Danville, Illinois	Folded
Davenport Braves	1960	1960	Davenport, Iowa	Renamed the Quad Cities Braves
Dayton Dragons	2000	–	Dayton, Ohio	Active
Decatur Commodores	1956	1974	Decatur, Illinois	Relocated to Wausau, Wisconsin as the Wausau Mets
Dubuque Packers (1)	1956	1967	Dubuque, Iowa	Renamed the Dubuque Royals
Dubuque Packers (2)	1974	1976	Dubuque, Iowa	Folded
Dubuque Royals	1968	1968	Dubuque, Iowa	Folded
Fort Wayne TinCaps	2009	–	Fort Wayne, Indiana	Active
Fort Wayne Wizards	1993	2008	Fort Wayne, Indiana	Renamed the Fort Wayne TinCaps
Fox Cities Foxes	1963	1966	Appleton, Wisconsin	Renamed the Appleton Foxes
Great Lakes Loons	2007	–	Midland, Michigan	Active
Kane County Cougars	1991	2020	Geneva, Illinois	Transferred to the American Association of Professional Baseball
Kenosha Twins	1984	1992	Kenosha, Wisconsin	Relocated to Fort Wayne, Indiana as the Fort Wayne Wizards
Keokuk Cardinals	1958	1961	Keokuk, Iowa	Renamed the Keokuk Dodgers
Keokuk Dodgers/Midwest Dodgers	1962	1962	Keokuk, Iowa/Dubuque, Iowa	Relocated to Wisconsin Rapids, Wisconsin as the Wisconsin Rapids Senators
Kokomo Dodgers	1956	1961	Kokomo, Indiana	Folded
Lafayette Red Sox	1956	1957	Lafayette, Indiana	Relocated to Waterloo, Iowa as the Waterloo Hawks
Lake County Captains	2010	–	Eastlake, Ohio	Active
Lansing Lugnuts	1996	–	Lansing, Michigan	Active
Madison Hatters	1994	1994	Madison, Wisconsin	Relocated to Battle Creek, Michigan as the Michigan Battle Cats
Madison Muskies	1982	1993	Madison, Wisconsin	Relocated to Comstock Park, Michigan as the West Michigan Whitecaps
Mattoon Athletics	1957	1957	Mattoon, Illinois	Relocated to Keokuk, Iowa as the Keokuk Cardinals
Mattoon Phillies	1956	1956	Mattoon, Illinois	Renamed the Mattoon Athletics
Michigan Battle Cats	1995	2002	Battle Creek, Michigan	Renamed the Battle Creek Yankees
Michigan City White Caps	1956	1959	Michigan City, Indiana	Folded
Paris Lakers	1956	1959	Paris, Illinois	Folded
Peoria Chiefs	1984	–	Peoria, Illinois	Active
Peoria Suns	1983	1983	Peoria, Illinois	Renamed the Peoria Chiefs
Quad Cities Angels	1962	1976	Davenport, Iowa	Renamed the Quad City Angels
Quad Cities Braves	1961	1961	Davenport, Iowa	Renamed the Quad Cities Angels
Quad Cities River Bandits	2008	–	Davenport, Iowa	Active
Quad City Angels (1)	1976	1978	Davenport, Iowa	Renamed the Quad City Cubs
Quad City Angels (2)	1985	1991	Davenport, Iowa	Renamed the Quad City River Bandits
Quad City Cubs	1979	1984	Davenport, Iowa	Renamed the Quad City Angels
Quad City River Bandits	1992	2003	Davenport, Iowa	Renamed the Swing of the Quad Cities
Quincy Cubs	1965	1973	Quincy, Illinois	Relocated to Dubuque, Iowa as the Dubuque Packers
Quincy Gems	1964	1964	Quincy, Illinois	Renamed the Quincy Cubs
Quincy Giants	1960	1961	Quincy, Illinois	Renamed the Quincy Jets
Quincy Jets	1962	1963	Quincy, Illinois	Renamed the Quincy Gems
Rockford Cubbies	1995	1998	Rockford, Illinois	Renamed the Rockford Reds
Rockford Expos	1988	1992	Rockford, Illinois	Renamed the Rockford Royals
Rockford Reds	1999	1999	Rockford, Illinois	Relocated to Dayton, Ohio as the Dayton Dragons
Rockford Royals	1993	1994	Rockford, Illinois	Renamed the Rockford Cubbies
South Bend Cubs	2015	–	South Bend, Indiana	Active
South Bend Silver Hawks	1994	2014	South Bend, Indiana	Renamed the South Bend Cubs
South Bend White Sox	1988	1993	South Bend, Indiana	Renamed the South Bend Silver Hawks
Southwest Michigan Devil Rays	2005	2006	Battle Creek, Michigan	Relocated to Midland, Michigan as the Great Lakes Loons
Springfield (IL) Cardinals	1982	1993	Springfield, Illinois	Relocated to Madison, Wisconsin as the Madison Hatters
Springfield Sultans	1994	1995	Springfield, Illinois	Relocated to Lansing, Michigan as the Lansing Lugnuts
Swing of the Quad Cities	2004	2007	Davenport, Iowa	Renamed the Quad Cities River Bandits
Waterloo Diamonds	1989	1993	Waterloo, Iowa	Relocated to Springfield, Illinois as the Springfield Sultans
Wausau Mets	1975	1978	Wausau, Wisconsin	Renamed the Wausau Timbers
Waterloo Hawks	1958	1969	Waterloo, Iowa	Renamed the Waterloo Royals
Waterloo Indians	1977	1988	Waterloo, Iowa	Renamed the Waterloo Diamonds
Waterloo Royals	1970	1976	Waterloo, Iowa	Renamed the Waterloo Indians
Wausau Timbers	1979	1990	Wausau, Wisconsin	Relocated to Geneva, Illinois as the Kane County Cougars
West Michigan Whitecaps	1994	–	Comstock Park, Michigan	Active
Wisconsin Rapids Senators	1963	1963	Wisconsin Rapids, Wisconsin	Renamed the Wisconsin Rapids Twins
Wisconsin Rapids Twins	1964	1983	Wisconsin Rapids, Wisconsin	Relocated to Kenosha, Wisconsin as the Kenosha Twins
Wisconsin Timber Rattlers	1995	–	Grand Chute, Wisconsin	Active

=== Map ===
Midwest League team locations

== See also ==
- List of Midwest League stadiums
