= 1959 Chicago Cubs season =

1959 Chicago Cubs
- League: National League
- Ballpark: Wrigley Field
- City: Chicago
- Record: 74–80 (.481)
- League place: 5th
- Owners: Philip K. Wrigley
- General managers: John Holland
- Managers: Bob Scheffing
- Television: WGN-TV (Jack Brickhouse, Vince Lloyd)
- Radio: WGN (Jack Quinlan, Lou Boudreau)

The 1959 Chicago Cubs season was the 88th season of the Chicago Cubs franchise, the 84th in the National League and the 44th at Wrigley Field. The Cubs tied the Cincinnati Reds for fifth in the National League with a record of 74–80, thirteen games behind the NL and World Series champion Los Angeles Dodgers.

== Offseason ==
- January 23, 1959: Jim Bolger and John Briggs were traded by the Cubs to the Cleveland Indians for Earl Averill and Morrie Martin.
- March 9, 1959: Chuck Tanner was traded by the Cubs to the Boston Red Sox for Bob Smith.
- Prior to 1959 season: Dick Burwell was signed as an amateur free agent by the Cubs.

== Regular season ==
Ernie Banks became the first shortstop in the history of the NL to win the MVP award in back to back seasons.

One of baseball history's weirdest plays took place on June 30, 1959, when the St. Louis Cardinals played the Cubs at Wrigley Field. Stan Musial was at the plate facing Bob Anderson with a count of 3–1. Anderson's next pitch was errant, the ball evaded catcher Sammy Taylor and rolled all the way to the backstop. Umpire Vic Delmore called "ball four", but Anderson and Taylor contended that Musial foul tipped the ball. Because the ball was still in play and Delmore was embroiled in an argument with Anderson and Taylor, Musial tried to run for second base. Seeing that Musial was running to second, third baseman Alvin Dark ran to the backstop to retrieve the ball. The ball wound up in the hands of field announcer Pat Pieper, but Dark ended up getting it back anyway. Absentmindedly, however, Delmore pulled out a new baseball and gave it to Taylor. When Anderson noticed that Musial was trying for second, he took the new ball from Sammy Taylor and threw it towards Tony Taylor covering second base, and the ball went over Taylor's head into the outfield. At the same time that Anderson threw the new ball towards second baseman Taylor, Dark threw the original ball to shortstop Ernie Banks. Musial did not see the throw and he was declared out when the tag was made.

=== Season standings ===
National League
Team	W	L	Pct.	GB	Home	Road
Los Angeles Dodgers	88	68	.564	—	46‍–‍32	42‍–‍36
Milwaukee Braves	86	70	.551	2	49‍–‍29	37‍–‍41
San Francisco Giants	83	71	.539	4	42‍–‍35	41‍–‍36
Pittsburgh Pirates	78	76	.506	9	47‍–‍30	31‍–‍46
Chicago Cubs	74	80	.481	13	38‍–‍39	36‍–‍41
Cincinnati Reds	74	80	.481	13	43‍–‍34	31‍–‍46
St. Louis Cardinals	71	83	.461	16	42‍–‍35	29‍–‍48
Philadelphia Phillies	64	90	.416	23	37‍–‍40	27‍–‍50

=== Record vs. opponents ===
1959 National League record Sources:
Team	CHC	CIN	LAD	MIL	PHI	PIT	SF	STL
Chicago	—	9–13	11–11	10–12	10–12–1	12–10	12–10	10–12
Cincinnati	13–9	—	13–9	11–11	9–13	9–13	8–14	11–11
Los Angeles	11–11	9–13	—	14–10	17–5	11–11	14–8	12–10
Milwaukee	12–10	11–11	10–14	—	13–9	15–7–1	12–10	13–9
Philadelphia	12–10–1	13–9	5–17	9–13	—	9–13	9–13	7–15
Pittsburgh	10–12	13–9	11–11	7–15–1	13–9	—	10–12	14–8
San Francisco	10–12	14–8	8–14	10–12	13–9	12–10	—	16–6
St. Louis	12–10	11–11	10–12	9–13	15–7	8–14	6–16	—

=== Notable transactions ===
- May 4, 1959: Bob Smith was traded by the Cubs to the Cleveland Indians for Randy Jackson.

=== Roster ===
1959 Chicago Cubs
Roster
Pitchers: 32 Bob Anderson; 38 John Buzhardt; 41 Art Ceccarelli; 22 Ed Donnelly; 39 Moe Drabowsky; 30 Dick Drott; 36 Don Elston; 37 Bill Henry; 31 Dave Hillman; 40 Glen Hobbie; 45 Ben Johnson; 45 Morrie Martin; 41 Seth Morehead; 41 Taylor Phillips; 43 Bob Porterfield; 46 Joe Schaffernoth; 42 Elmer Singleton; 43 Bob Smith	Catchers: 6 Earl Averill; 11 Cal Neeman; 15 Sammy Taylor; Infielders: 16 Bobby Adams; 14 Ernie Banks; 17 Alvin Dark; 18 Don Eaddy; 4 Johnny Goryl; 16 Randy Jackson; 8 Dale Long; 12 Jim Marshall; 43 Art Schult; 5 Tony Taylor	Outfielders: 21 George Altman; 20 Chick King; 7 Walt Moryn; 20 Irv Noren; 9 Bobby Thomson; 2 Lee Walls; 4 Billy Williams; Other batters: 22,42 Lou Jackson	Manager: 25 Bob Scheffing; Coaches: 33 Fred Fitzsimmons; 35 Rogers Hornsby; 34 George Myatt; 10 El Tappe

== Player stats ==
=== Batting ===
==== Starters by position ====
Note: Pos = Position; G = Games played; AB = At bats; H = Hits; Avg. = Batting average; HR = Home runs; RBI = Runs batted in

Pos	Player	G	AB	H	Avg.	HR	RBI
C	Sammy Taylor	110	353	95	.269	13	43
1B	Dale Long	110	296	70	.236	14	37
2B	Tony Taylor	150	624	175	.280	8	38
3B	Alvin Dark	136	477	126	.264	6	45
SS	Ernie Banks	155	589	179	.304	45	143
LF	Walt Moryn	117	381	89	.234	14	48
CF	George Altman	135	420	103	.245	12	47
RF	Lee Walls	120	354	91	.257	8	33

==== Other batters ====
Note: G = Games played; AB = At bats; H = Hits; Avg. = Batting average; HR = Home runs; RBI = Runs batted in

Player	G	AB	H	Avg.	HR	RBI
Bobby Thomson	122	374	97	.259	11	52
Jim Marshall	108	294	74	.252	11	40
Earl Averill	74	186	44	.237	10	34
Irv Noren	65	156	50	.321	4	19
Art Schult	42	118	32	.271	2	14
Cal Neeman	44	105	17	.162	3	9
Randy Jackson	41	74	18	.243	1	10
Johnny Goryl	25	48	9	.188	1	6
Billy Williams	18	33	5	.152	0	2
Lou Jackson	6	4	1	.250	0	1
Chick King	7	3	0	.000	0	0
Bobby Adams	3	2	0	.000	0	0
Don Eaddy	15	1	0	.000	0	0

=== Pitching ===
==== Starting pitchers ====
Note: G = Games pitched; IP = Innings pitched; W = Wins; L = Losses; ERA = Earned run average; SO = Strikeouts

Player	G	IP	W	L	ERA	SO
Bob Anderson	37	235.1	12	13	4.13	113
Glen Hobbie	46	234.0	16	13	3.69	138
Moe Drabowsky	31	141.2	5	10	4.13	70
Art Ceccarelli	18	102.0	5	5	4.76	56
Dick Drott	8	27.1	1	2	5.93	15

==== Other pitchers ====
Note: G = Games pitched; IP = Innings pitched; W = Wins; L = Losses; ERA = Earned run average; SO = Strikeouts

Player	G	IP	W	L	ERA	SO
Dave Hillman	39	191.0	8	11	3.53	88
John Buzhardt	31	101.1	4	5	4.97	33
Seth Morehead	11	18.2	0	1	4.82	9
Ben Johnson	4	16.2	0	0	2.16	6
Taylor Phillips	7	16.2	0	2	7.56	5
Joe Schaffernoth	5	7.2	1	0	8.22	3

==== Relief pitchers ====
Note: G = Games pitched; W = Wins; L = Losses; SV = Saves; ERA = Earned run average; SO = Strikeouts

Player	G	W	L	SV	ERA	SO
Don Elston	65	10	8	13	3.32	82
Bill Henry	65	9	8	12	2.68	115
Elmer Singleton	21	2	1	0	2.72	25
Ed Donnelly	9	1	1	0	3.14	6
Bob Porterfield	4	0	0	0	11.37	0
Morrie Martin	3	0	0	0	19.29	1
Bob Smith	1	0	0	0	81.00	0

== Awards and records ==
- Ernie Banks, National League MVP

== Farm system ==
Level	Team	League	Manager
AAA	Fort Worth Cats	American Association	Lou Klein
AA	San Antonio Missions	Texas League	Grady Hatton
A	Lancaster Red Roses	Eastern League	Nick Cullop
B	Burlington Bees	Illinois–Indiana–Iowa League	Ray Mueller
D	Morristown Cubs	Appalachian League	Red Hayworth
D	Paris Lakers	Midwest League	Verlon Walker
D	Carlsbad Potashers	Sophomore League	Walt Dixon

LEAGUE CHAMPIONS: Morristown
