= Eldorado (baseball) =

- 1910; Eldorado, Illinois

Minor league affiliations
- Class: Class D (1910)
- League: Southern Illinois League (1910)

Major league affiliations
- Team: None

Minor league titles
- League titles (0): None

Team data
- Name: Eldoardo (1910)
- Ballpark: Mahoney Park (1910)

The Eldorado team was a minor league baseball team based in Eldorado, Illinois. In 1910, Eldorado played as members of the Class D level Southern Illinois League, hosting home games at Mahoney Park. The league folded during the 1910 season with the Eldorado in second place.

== History ==
Eldorado began minor league play in 1910, when the Southern Illinois League formed as a five–team Class D level minor league. Playing under the direction of league president C.C. Wright, the Southern Illinois League began play with the Harrisburg Merchants, Herrin, Illinois team, McLeansboro Merchants and Mount Vernon Merchants teams joining Eldorado in beginning league play. The league schedule began on May 30, 1910.

The Southern Illinois League was short lived and lost a team when the Mount Vernon Merchants disbanded on June 30, 1910. After briefly continuing play with the four remaining teams, the Southern Illinois League permanently folded on July 11, 1910. The McLeansboro Merchants were in first place when the league folded, followed by Eldorado.

In the final 1910 standings, the McLeansboro Merchants had a record of 20–5 when the league folded and finished 6½ games ahead of second place Eldorado (14–12), followed by Herrin (8–11), the Mount Vernon Merchants (8–11) and Harrisburg Merchants (6–17).

Eldorado has not hosted another minor league team.

== The ballpark ==
The 1910 Eldorado team hosted minor league home games at Mahoney Park. The ballpark was located at State Street & Eldorado Street. Today, Mahoney Park is still in use as a public park, located at 1805 Hardy Street.

== Year–by–year record ==
Year	Record	Finish	Manager	Playoffs/Notes
1910	14–12	2nd	NA	League folded July 10

== Notable alumni ==
- The roster information for the 1910 Eldorado team is unknown.
