= Veterans Park (Mount Vernon, Illinois) =

Former sports facility in Mount Vernon, Illinois

Coordinates: 38°18′34″N 88°55′21″W

Veterans Park was a baseball ballpark in Mount Vernon, Illinois that served as the home field of the Mount Vernon Kings from 1947 to 1954. It was also known as Braves Field and Vernon Park. The park still exists without a ball field and is located at 800 South 27th Street, Mount Vernon, Illinois 62864.

Veterans Park hosted the Mississippi–Ohio Valley League All-Star Games in 1949 and 1951. The Mississippi-Ohio Valley League was a direct predecessor of the Midwest League.
