= Vincennes Velvets =

- 1950–1952; Vincennes, Indiana

Minor league affiliations
- Class: Class D (1950–1952)
- League: Mississippi–Ohio Valley League (1950–1952)

Major league affiliations
- Team: St. Louis Browns (1950)

Minor league titles
- League titles (3): 1905; 1906; 1910

Team data
- Name: Vincennes Velvets (1950–1952)
- Ballpark: Nehi Park (1950–1952)

The Vincennes Velvets was the final moniker of the minor league baseball teams based in Vincennes, Indiana, United States. From 1950 to 1952, Vincennes played as members of the Class D level Mississippi–Ohio Valley League, which evolved to become today's Midwest League.

Previous Vincennes teams played under numerous nicknames as members of the Kentucky-Indiana League (1896), Kentucky-Illinois-Tennessee League (1903–1906, 1910–1911, 1913) and Eastern Illinois League (1908), winning league championships in 1905, 1906 and 1910.

The 1950 Vincennes Velvets were a minor league affiliate of the St. Louis Browns. The Velvets hosted minor league home games at Nehi Park.

== History ==
The Vincennes Velvets were preceded in minor league play by other Vincennes-based teams. In 1903, the Vincennes Alices first played minor league baseball as members of the Kentucky-Illinois-Tennessee League, also known as the KITTY League. Vincennes played in the Kentucky-Illinois-Tennessee League in the 1903–1906, 1910–1911 and 1913 seasons. The team used the Vincennes Reds moniker in 1904 and the Vincennes Hoosiers moniker in 1911. In 1908, the Vincennes Alices played one season as members of the 1908 Eastern Illinois League.

The Vincennes Alices won Kentucky-Illinois-Tennessee League Championships in 1905, 1906 and 1910.

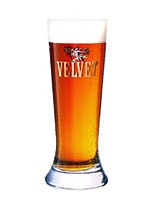
Velvet Beer, namesake of the Vincennes Velvets

Following the 1949 season, the Belleville Stags of the Mississippi–Ohio Valley League moved to Vincennes. The franchise became the Vincennes Velvets beginning play in 1950 as an affiliate of the St. Louis Browns, before operating as an independent in 1951–1952. The Velvets team was named after the Champagne Velvet Beer sponsor.

The 1950 Vincennes Velvets ended the season with a record of 43–76, finishing in seventh place in the eight–team Mississippi–Ohio Valley League regular season under managers Mel Ivy and Andy Smith. Vincennes was 38.0 games behind the first place Centralia Sterlings in the final regular season standings. Playing at Nehi Park, Vincennes had total home attendance of 18,977, an average of 319 per game.

The Vincennes Velvets finished in sixth place in 1951, ending the season 39.5 games behind the first place Paris Lakers in the regular season standings. With a 43–74 record under managers Stormy Kromer and Bob Signaigo, Vincennes was last in the six–team Mississippi–Ohio Valley League standings. Vincennes had 1951 total attendance of 25,652, an average of 438 per game, fifth in the league.

The Vincennes Velvets franchise moved to Canton, Illinois, where the franchise became the Canton Aces on June 7, 1952. The Vincennes/Canton team finished the 1952 season with a 54–70 record and placed sixth in the eight–team Mississippi–Ohio Valley League, finishing 31.5 games behind the first place Danville Dans. The Vincennes Velvets were the last minor league team in Vincennes, Indiana.

== The ballpark ==
Beginning in 1950, Vincennes hosted minor league home games at Nehi Park. No longer in existence, Nehi Park was located at 13th Street and Willow Street in Vincennes, Indiana. The ballpark was located behind the Nehi Bottling Works.

== Timeline ==
Year(s)	# Yrs.	Team	Level	League
1903	1	Vincennes Alices	Class D	Kentucky-Illinois-Tennessee League
1904	1	Vincennes Reds	Class D	Kentucky-Illinois-Tennessee League
1905–1906	2	Vincennes Alices	Class D	Kentucky-Illinois-Tennessee League
1908	1	Vincennes Alices	Class D	Eastern Illinois League
1910	1	Vincennes Alices	Class D	Kentucky-Illinois-Tennessee League
1911	1	Vincennes Hoosiers	Class D	Kentucky-Illinois-Tennessee League
1913	1	Vincennes Alices	Class D	Kentucky-Illinois-Tennessee League
1950–1952	3	Vincennes Velvets	Class D	Mississippi–Ohio Valley League

== Notable alumni ==
- Zinn Beck (1908)
- Chet Carmichael (1908)
- Jim Duggan (1905)
- Charlie French (1905–1906)
- Harry Glenn (1911)
- Clyde Goodwin (1904)
- Roy Hawes (1950)
- Ed Hug (1904)
- Heinie Jantzen (1911)
- Eddie Kolb (1905–1906)
- Hub Perdue (1905–1906)
- Ollie Pickering (1911, 1913, MGR)

== See also ==
Vincennes Velvets/Canton Aces
- Vincennes Alices players
- Vincennes Hoosiers players
