= Joe Schaffernoth =

American baseball player (1937–2016)

- Pitcher
- Born: August 6, 1937; Trenton, New Jersey, U.S.
- Died: June 18, 2016 (aged 78); Berkeley Heights, New Jersey, U.S.
- Batted: Right Threw: Right

MLB debut
- April 15, 1959, for the Chicago Cubs

Last MLB appearance
- September 30, 1961, for the Cleveland Indians

MLB statistics
- Win–loss record: 3–8
- Earned run average: 4.58
- Strikeouts: 68
- Stats at Baseball Reference

Teams
- Chicago Cubs (1959–1961); Cleveland Indians (1961)

Joseph Arthur Schaffernoth (August 6, 1937 – June 18, 2016) was an American professional baseball player and right-handed pitcher who appeared in 74 games, all but one in relief, in Major League Baseball for the Chicago Cubs (1959–1961) and Cleveland Indians (1961). He was listed as 6 feet 4 inches (1.93 m) tall and 195 pounds (88 kg).

== Playing career ==
Born in Trenton, New Jersey, Schaffernoth attended Jonathan Dayton High School in Springfield Township. After graduating, he began his professional career in the Cubs' organization 1956 with the Class-D Paris Lakers. In 31 games, he had a win–loss record of 21–6 and a 2.72 earned run average (ERA). The following two seasons, he played for the Des Moines Bruins and Pueblo Bruins and had records of 9–12 and 5–8.

Schaffernoth made the 1959 Cubs' roster out of spring training, and made his MLB debut on April 15, 1959, with a scoreless inning of relief against the San Francisco Giants. In his second appearance, on April 18 at Los Angeles Memorial Coliseum, he made his only big-league start against the Dodgers, who were en route to the 1959 World Series championship. Schaffernoth failed to retire a batter, surrendering three hits, one base on balls and three earned runs. He was spared a loss when the Cubs came back to tie the game in the third inning, but Chicago eventually dropped the contest, 8–7. When the Cubs signed Bob Porterfield a month later, Schaffernoth was placed on the disabled list due to an elbow injury, and finished the year with the Fort Worth Cats.

In 1960, Schaffernoth split the season between the Triple-A Houston Buffs (where he went 8–2) and the Cubs. Called back to Chicago in June, he posted his best major-league season. In 33 games, he had a 2–3 record, a 2.78 ERA, and 33 strikeouts in 55 innings pitched.

However, in 1961, he was less effective, and had a 0–4 record and a 6.34 ERA when his contract was sold on waivers to the Indians. He relieved in 15 games for the Tribe, and dropped his only decision with a 4.76 earned run average. At the end of the season, the Washington Senators acquired his contract, but they returned him to the Cleveland organization prior to the 1962 season.

Schaffernoth spent the year with the Jacksonville Suns, compiling an 18–11 record with a 2.67 ERA in 30 starts, and was named the International League pitcher of the year. Schaffernoth spent 1963 with Jacksonville in what ended up being his final professional season, finishing with a 3–7 record and a 3.47 ERA in 17 games.

As a major leaguer, Schaffernoth lost eight of 11 decisions, with three saves and a career ERA of 4.58. In 118 innings pitched, he allowed 116 hits and 53 bases on balls, with 68 strikeouts.

He died of cancer in 2016, at the age of 78.
