= McLeansboro, Illinois, minor league baseball history =

McLeansboro, Illinois minor league teams
- 1910–1911; McLeansboro, Illinois

Minor league affiliations
- Class: Class D (1910–1911)
- League: Southern Illinois League (1910); Kentucky-Illinois-Tennessee League (1910–1911)

Major league affiliations
- Team: None

Minor league titles
- League titles (2): 1910; 1910

Team data
- Name: McLeansboro Merchants (1910); McLeansboro Billikens (1910); McLeansboro Miners (1911)
- Ballpark: Fairgrounds Park (1910–1911)

Minor league baseball teams were based in McLeansboro, Illinois. In 1910 and 1911, McLeansboro teams played under three nicknames as members of the 1910 Southern Illinois League and the Kentucky-Illinois-Tennessee League from 1910 to 1911, winning two league championships in 1910. McLeansboro hosted home minor league games at Fairgrounds Park.

== History ==
The McLeansboro Merchants began minor league play in 1910, a season that saw the team win championships in two different leagues under two different nicknames. The McLeansboro franchise was a charter member when the Southern Illinois League was formed for the 1910 season as a five–team Class D level league. The Southern Illinois League began play on May 30, 1910, with the charter franchises Eldorado, Illinois team, Harrisburg Merchants, Herrin, Illinois team and Mount Vernon Merchants joining McLeansboro in league play.

The Southern Illinois League permanently folded on July 11, 1910. In the final 1910 standings, the McLeansboro Merchants were in first place with a 20–5 record when the league folded. Playing under manager Ollie Gfroerer, McLeansboro finished 6.5 games ahead of Eldorado (14–12). They were followed by Herrin (8–11), the Mount Vernon Merchants (8–11) and Harrisburg Merchants (6–17) in the final standings.

McLeansboro immediately continued play in 1910 in a second league and won a second championship under manager Ollie Gfroerer. The franchise became members of the Class D level Kentucky-Illinois-Tennessee League (KITTY League) at the half–way point of the season. They were joined by the Harrisburg Merchants in moving to the Kitty League. The newly named McLeansboro Billikens had a record of 40–18 in the second half of the split–season schedule and won the second half title. There were no playoffs held, with McLeansboro and the Vincennes Alices, who won the first half title, being declared Co–Champions. McLeansboro's Clarence Kraft led the team with a .292 average and his 4 homers tied for the league lead. He also led the league with a 13–2 record as a pitcher.

In 1911, the team was renamed the McLeansboro Miners as the franchise continued play as members of the Kentucky-Illinois–Tennessee–League. On June 20, 1911, after compiling a 19–15 record, McLeansboro moved to Henderson, Kentucky. The move was made in part because McLeansboro did not permit Sunday baseball. The team became the Henderson Hens after the move. The McLeansboro/Henderson team ended the 1911 season with a 65–58 overall record, placing third in the Kentucky-Illinois–Tennessee–League. The managers were Miles Bradshaw and John Stelle.

McLeansboro, Illinois has not hosted another minor league team.

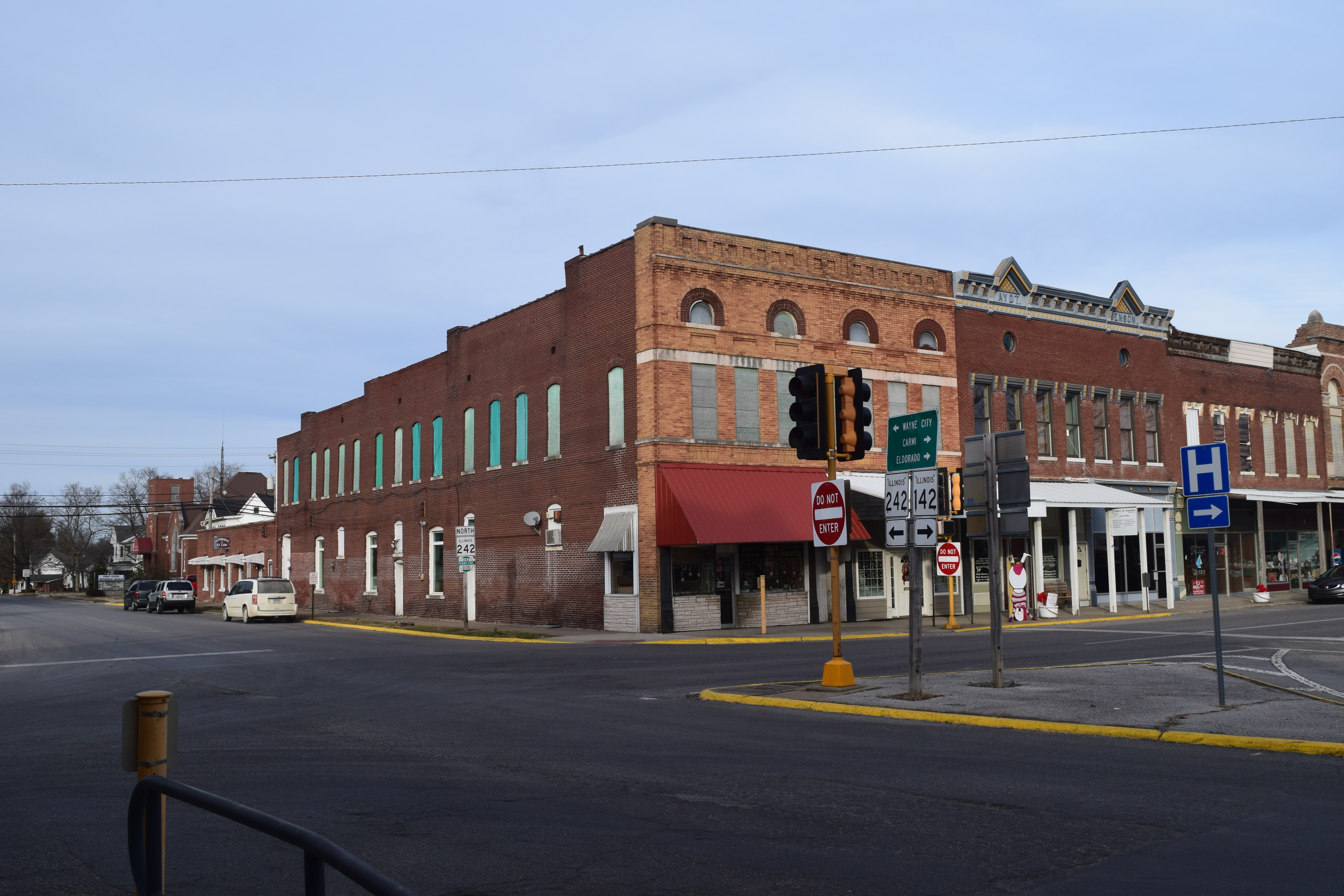
(2019) Illinois Route 142 and 242. McLeansboro, Illinois

== The ballpark ==
The McLeansboro teams played minor league home games at Fairgrounds Park. The ballpark was located at the Hamilton County Fairgrounds. Today, the fairgrounds are still in use as home to the Hamilton County Fair. The address is 808 West Randolph Street.

== Timeline ==
Year(s)	# Yrs.	Team	Level	League	Ballpark
1910 (1)	1	McLeansboro Merchants	Class D	Southern Illinois League	Fairgrounds Park
1910 (2)	1	McLeansboro Billikens	Class D	Kentucky-Illinois-Tennessee League	Fairgrounds Park
1911	1	McLeansboro Miners	Class D	Kentucky-Illinois-Tennessee League	Fairgrounds Park

== Year–by–year records ==
Year	Record	Finish	Manager	Playoffs/Notes
1910 (1)	20–5	1st	Ollie Gfroerer	League champions
1910 (2)	40–18	1st	Ollie Gfroerer	League Co-Champions
1911	65–58	3rd	Miles Bradshaw / John Stelle	Moved to Henderson (19–15) June 11

== Notable alumni ==
- George Beck (1910)
- Clarence Kraft (1910)
- McLeansboro Merchants players
- McLeansboro Billikens players
