= Kokomo Dodgers =

- 1955–1961; Kokomo, Indiana

Minor league affiliations
- Class: Class D (1955–1961)
- League: Midwest League (1956–1961); Mississippi–Ohio Valley League (1955)

Major league affiliations
- Team: Brooklyn/Los Angeles Dodgers (1956–1961); New York Giants (1955)

Team data
- Name: Kokomo Dodgers (1956–1961); Kokomo Giants (1955)
- Ballpark: Highland Park Stadium (1955–1961)

The Kokomo Dodgers were a Minor League Baseball team based in Kokomo, Indiana, between 1955 and 1961. After playing the 1955 season as the Kokomo Giants, a New York Giants affiliate, the 1956 "Dodgers" became charter members of the Midwest League, as the Mississippi–Ohio Valley League, as the changed Mississippi–Ohio Valley League names following the 1955 season. The Dodgers were an affiliate of the Brooklyn/Los Angeles Dodgers from 1956 to 1961. The Kokomo teams hosted minor league home games at Highland Park Stadium.

Baseball Hall of Fame member Orlando Cepeda played for the 1955 Kokomo Giants.

== History ==
In 1955, Kokomo replaced the Mount Vernon Kings in the Mississippi-Ohio Valley League, playing as the Kokomo Giants, an affiliate of the San Francisco Giants. The next season, the Kokomo Dodgers became a charter member of newly formed Midwest League, which grew out of the Mississippi-Ohio Valley League. The other seven Midwest League charter franchises were the Clinton Pirates, Dubuque Packers, Decatur Commodores, Michigan City White Caps, Paris Lakers, Lafayette Red Sox and Mattoon Phillies.

Former Dodger Pete Reiser was the team's manager during the 1956 and 1957 seasons. The team won the Midwest League pennant in 1957, but lost in the playoffs.

== The Ballpark ==
The team played at Highland Park Stadium.

== Notable alumni ==
=== Baseball Hall of Fame alumni ===
- Orlando Cepeda (1955) Inducted, 1999

=== Notable alumni ===
- Mike Brumley (1957)
- Tommy Davis (1957) 3x MLB All–Star; 2× NL Batting Champion (1962, 1963); 1962 NL RBI Leader
- Tim Harkness (1957)
- Clarence Jones (1961)
- Bill Kelso (1961)
- Don Miles (1956)
- Rod Miller (1959)
- Ed Palmquist (1956)
- Pete Reiser (1956–1957, MGR) 3x MLB All–Star; 1941 NL Batting Champion; 2× NL Stolen Base Leader (1942, 1946)
- Nate Smith (1956)
- Hector Valle (1960)

=== See also ===
Kokomo Dodgers players
