= Fans Field (Decatur) =

Former minor league baseball park in Decatur, IL, USA

Coordinates: 39.861518°N 88.935893°W

Fans Field was a minor league baseball park in Decatur, IL. It was the home of the Decatur Commodores, of the Three-I League, Mississippi-Ohio Valley League and Midwest League, from 1927 through 1974. It was at the southeast corner of East Garfield Avenue (left field) and North Woodford Street (third base).

During late 1974 and early 1975, the city debated what to do with the abandoned ballpark. The decision to redevelop it came in August 1975, and by month's end its mostly-wooden stands had been demolished.[Decatur Daily Review, August 22, 1975, p. 22]

The site was remade into a softball venue, retaining the name Fans Field. The new softball facility opened in June 1977.[Decatur Herald and Review, May 30, 1977, p. 3]

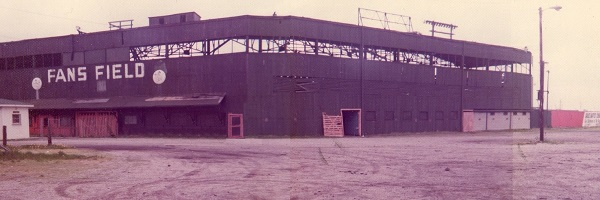
Fans Field shortly before its demolition

== History ==
The first game played at Fans Field was on Thursday May 5, 1927 at 3pm, and was attended by Commissioner of Baseball Kenesaw Mountain Landis along with a crowd of nearly 7,000. The Commodores lost to the Evansville Hubs, 5–3.

The finale came on August 19, 1974, with the Commodores losing to Wisconsin Rapids 3–1. Final attendance was about 300.[Decatur Herald and Review, August 20, 1974, p. 6]

== Dimensions ==
The left and right field foul poles were 340 feet (100 m) from home plate, and the center field fence was 370 feet (110 m) from home plate.[Philip J. Lowry, Green Cathedrals, 1986, p. 125]
