= Southern Illinois League =

- Classification: Independent (1895–1896); Class D (1910)
- Sport: Minor League Baseball
- First season: 1895
- Folded: July 11, 1910
- President: C.C. Wright (1910)
- No. of teams: 5
- Country: United States of America
- Most titles: 1 McLeansboro Merchants (1910)
- Related competitions: Kentucky–Illinois–Tennessee League

The Southern Illinois League was a Class D level minor league baseball league that played in the 1910 season. The five–team Southern Illinois League consisted of franchises based exclusively in Illinois. The Southern Illinois League permanently folded during the 1910 season, with the McLeansboro Merchants in first place.

== History ==
An Independent minor league named the "Southern Illinois League" played in the 1895 and 1896 seasons. The teams and statistics from the 1895 and 1896 seasons are unknown.

The Southern Illinois League was formed for the 1910 season as a five–team Class D level minor league under the direction of league president C.C. Wright. The Southern Illinois League began play on May 30, 1910, with the Eldorado, Illinois team, Harrisburg Merchants, Herrin, Illinois team, McLeansboro Merchants and Mount Vernon Merchants as charter members.

After beginning play, the Southern Illinois League lost a team when the Mount Vernon Merchants disbanded on June 30, 1910. After continuing play, the Southern Illinois League permanently folded on July 11, 1910. The McLeansboro Merchants were in first place when the league shut down.

In the final 1910 standings, the McLeansboro Merchants had a record of 20–5 when the league folded to finish in first place. McLeansboro finished 6.5 games ahead of Eldorado (14–12), followed by Herrin (8–11), the Mount Vernon Merchants (8–11) and Harrisburg Merchants (6–17).

After the Southern Illinois League folded, two of its members, McLeansboro and Harrisburg, joined the Kentucky–Illinois–Tennessee League (KITTY League) in the middle of the 1910 season.

== 1910 Southern Illinois League teams ==
Team name	City represented	Ballpark	Year active
Eldorado	Eldorado, Illinois	Mahoney Park	1910
Harrisburg Merchants	Harrisburg, Illinois	Unknown	1910
Herrin	Herrin, Illinois	Unknown	1910
McLeansboro Merchants	McLeansboro, Illinois	Fairgrounds Park	1910
Mount Vernon Merchants	Mount Vernon, Illinois	Unknown	1910

== League standings ==
=== 1910 Southern Illinois League ===
Team standings	W	L	PCT	GB	Managers
McLeansboro Merchants	20	5	.800	–	Ollie Gfroerer
Eldorado	14	12	.538	6½	NA
Herrin	8	11	.421	9	Pa Bradshaw
Mt. Vernon Merchants	8	11	.421	9	Ira Hastings
Harrisburg Merchants	6	17	.261	13	NA

Mt. Vernon disbanded June 30.
The league folded June 30. Harrisburg and McLeansboro joined the Kitty League July 24.
