= Ben Johnson (pitcher) =

American baseball player (1931–2020)

- Pitcher
- Born: May 15, 1931; Greenwood, South Carolina, U.S.
- Died: May 8, 2020 (aged 88); Greenwood, South Carolina, U.S.
- Batted: Right Threw: Right

MLB debut
- September 6, 1959, for the Chicago Cubs

Last MLB appearance
- June 12, 1960, for the Chicago Cubs

MLB statistics
- Win–loss record: 2–1
- Earned run average: 3.59
- Strikeouts: 15
- Stats at Baseball Reference

Teams
- Chicago Cubs (1959–1960)

Benjamin Franklin Johnson Jr. (May 15, 1931 – May 8, 2020) was an American professional baseball pitcher who appeared in 21 games in Major League Baseball over parts of the 1959 and 1960 seasons for the Chicago Cubs. A native and lifelong resident of Greenwood, South Carolina, he graduated from Greenwood High School and was a veteran of the United States Marine Corps.

Johnson threw and batted right-handed, and was listed as 6 feet 2 inches (1.88 m) tall and 190 pounds (86 kg). He signed his first pro contract with the Boston Braves' organization in 1949 and missed the 1952 and 1953 seasons performing military service in the Korean War. He was 28 years old when he received his first MLB opportunity in the closing weeks of the 1959 Cubs' season, working in four games with two starts. In those starting assignments, against the Cincinnati Reds on September 10 and the Pittsburgh Pirates six days later, he went a total of ten innings pitched and allowed only three earned runs. Chicago won both contests, but Johnson was not involved in either decision. He began 1960 with the Cubs and appeared in 17 games through June 12, all in relief, picking up two wins and one save. He spent the rest of the year with the Triple-A Houston Buffs.

As a major leaguer, Johnson compiled a 2–1 won–lost mark, with that one save, and a 3.91 earned run average. In 46 innings pitched, he allowed 56 hits and 15 bases on balls, striking out 15. He had an extensive minor league baseball career, spanning 14 seasons between 1949 and 1964, and winning 132 games.

Ben Johnson died May 8, 2020, at his home.
