= Clinton Owls =

Clinton Giants
- 1937–1941; Clinton, Iowa

Minor league affiliations
- Class: Class B
- League: Illinois–Indiana–Iowa League

Major league affiliations
- Team: New York Giants (1939–1941); Brooklyn Dodgers (1937–1938)

Team data
- Name: Clinton Giants (1939–1941); Clinton Owls (1937–1939)
- Ballpark: Riverview Stadium

The Clinton Owls were a Minor League Baseball team based in Clinton, Iowa, United States, that operated in the Illinois–Indiana–Iowa League in 1937–1938 as an affiliate of the Brooklyn Dodgers. From 1939–1940 they were an affiliate of the New York Giants and were known as the Clinton Giants. The team was disbanded at the onset of World War II. Today, the Clinton franchise is the Clinton LumberKings who still play at Riverview Stadium, now called NelsonCorp Field.

== Notable players ==
- Sam Nahem (1915–2004), Major League Baseball pitcher
