= Doc Bracken =

American baseball player

- Pitcher
- Born: May 12, 1915; Paducah, Kentucky, U.S.
- Died: February 15, 1994 (aged 78); St. Louis, Missouri, U.S.
- Batted: Right Threw: Right

Negro league baseball debut
- 1946, for the Cleveland Buckeyes

Last appearance
- 1947, for the Cleveland Buckeyes

Career statistics
- Win–loss record: 4–3
- Earned run average: 5.52
- Strikeouts: 37
- Stats at Baseball Reference

Teams
- Cleveland Buckeyes (1946–1947)

Herbert Bracken (May 12, 1915 – February 15, 1994), nicknamed "Doc", was an American Negro league pitcher in the 1940s.

A native of Paducah, Kentucky, Bracken served in the US Navy during World War II. He made his Negro leagues debut in 1946 for the Cleveland Buckeyes, and was the winning pitcher in Cleveland's lone victory of the 1947 Negro World Series, tossing nine innings and allowing one earned run in the Buckeyes' 10–7 Game 2 win. Bracken went on to play in the minor leagues for the Belleville Stags in 1949 and the Paris Lakers in 1954. He died in St. Louis, Missouri in 1994 at age 78.
