= Centralia Cubs =

- 1947–1952; (1947–1952); Centralia, Illinois

Minor league affiliations
- Previous classes: Class D 1947–1952
- Previous leagues: Mississippi–Ohio Valley League (1949–1952); Illinois State League (1947–1948)

Major league affiliations
- Previous teams: Chicago Cubs (1947–1948)

Team data
- Previous names: Centralia Sterlings (1950); Centralia Zeros (1951–1952)
- Previous parks: Fan's Field

The Centralia Cubs, based in Centralia, Illinois, US, were one namesake of the Centralia franchise that played in the Illinois State League (1947–1948) and Mississippi–Ohio Valley League (1949–1952), the two leagues that were the direct predecessors of the Midwest League.

== History ==
The Centralia franchise lasted for six seasons. The two leagues it played in were direct predecessors of today's Midwest League. Centralia was a charter member of the ISL. Centralia was affiliated with the Chicago Cubs in 1947 and 1948 and played home games at Fan's Field. The franchise was also known as the Centralia Sterlings (1950) and the Centralia Zeros (1951–1952). The 1950 squad finished 83–40. The franchise folded in 1952 and was not replaced in the Mississippi–Ohio Valley League. Their overall record was 368–349 (.513).

== The ballpark ==
The franchise played at Fan's Field, which was located at East Rexford Street at Jackson Avenue, where the park sat adjacent to the public school.

== No Hitters ==
- On July 8, 1950, Centralia's Gene Pisarski threw a no-hitter against the West Frankfort Cardinals, winning 6–0.

== Notable alumni ==
- Chuck Hawley (1947, MGR) Also played professional basketball
- Billy Klaus (1947) 2nd in 1955 AL Rookie of the Year voting
- Claude Passeau (1948, MGR/Player) 5 x MLB All-Star; 1939 NL Strikeout Leader
