= Chuck Hawley =

American baseball player

Personal information
- Born: April 3, 1915 Odin, Illinois, U.S.
- Died: October 2, 1992 (aged 77) Odin, Illinois, U.S.
- Listed height: 6 ft 3 in (1.91 m)
- Listed weight: 195 lb (88 kg)
- Position: Guard / forward

Career history
- 1946–1947: Detroit Gems

Charles Stanley Hawley (April 3, 1915 – October 2, 1992) was an American professional basketball and minor league baseball player. He also coached baseball at the junior college level at Kaskaskia College.

== Basketball career ==
Hawley's brief professional basketball career was in the National Basketball League. In 12 career games during the 1946–47 season, Hawley played for the Detroit Gems and scored 17 points.

== Minor league baseball career ==
=== Player ===
Hawley began playing in the minor league at age 21 as a pitcher and pitched from 1936 to 1954. He had 210 wins and 160 losses with an ERA of 3.68. His batting average for those 19 years was .263 including 28 home runs. His playing career consisted of:

- 7 seasons D league – Centralia, Mattoon, Mt. Vernon, Canton/Vincennes
- 3 seasons C league – Greenville, El Dorado,
- 6 seasons B league – Durham, Columbia, Anniston, Texarkana, Bryan/Del Rio
- 4 seasons A league – Waterloo, Albany
- 4 seasons A1 league – Birmingham, Little Rock

He holds the best pitching record with Mattoon Indians in 1948 with 18 wins and ERA of 1.80. Mattoon was a charter member of the Midwest League's predecessor, the Illinois State League. The franchise moved to Keokuk after the 1957 season.

=== Manager ===
Hawley managed/played from 1947 to 1954 for:

- 1947 – Centralia Cubs
- 1948 – Mattoon Indians
- 1949 – Mattoon Indians
- 1950 – Mattoon Indians
- 1951 – Mount Vernon Kings
- 1952 – Canton Citizens/Vincennes Velvets
- 1953 – Texarkana Bears
- 1954 – Bryan/Del Rio Indians
