= Lou Jackson =

American baseball player (1935–1969)

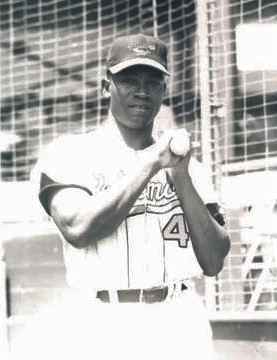
- Outfielder
- Born: July 26, 1935; Riverton, Louisiana, U.S.
- Died: May 28, 1969 (aged 33); Tokyo, Japan
- Batted: Left Threw: Right

Professional debut
- MLB: July 23, 1958, for the Chicago Cubs
- NPB: 1966, for the Sankei Atoms

Last appearance
- MLB: May 11, 1964, for the Baltimore Orioles
- NPB: 1968, for the Sankei Atoms

MLB statistics
- Batting average: .213
- Home runs: 1
- Runs batted in: 7

NPB statistics
- Batting average: .257
- Home runs: 68
- Runs batted in: 181
- Stats at Baseball Reference

Teams
- Chicago Cubs (1958–1959); Baltimore Orioles (1964); Sankei Atoms (1966–1968)

Louis Clarence Jackson (July 26, 1935 – May 27, 1969) was an American professional baseball player. Jackson, an outfielder, played Major League Baseball and Nippon Professional Baseball between 1958 and 1968, appearing in 34 games over parts of three seasons in the Majors for the Chicago Cubs and Baltimore Orioles, and in 329 games over three seasons in Japan for the Sankei Atoms. He attended Grambling State University, threw right-handed, batted left-handed, and was listed at 5 feet 10 inches (1.78 m) tall and 168 pounds (76 kg).

== Chicago Cubs ==
Jackson was originally signed by the Cubs in 1957 as an amateur free agent. That season, he played for the class-C Magic Valley Cowboys, batting .310 with 15 home runs. The following season, he was moved up to the class-A Pueblo Dodgers, and made his major league debut in July. He played 24 games for the Cubs, with just 6 hits in 35 at-bats, including his first and only major league home run off Ray Semproch of the Philadelphia Phillies on August 3, 1958.

In 1959, Jackson spent most of the season back in the minors, most of it with the class-A Lancaster Red Roses. He did play in 6 games for the Cubs that September, but had just four at-bats. During the offseason, he was traded with two other players to the Cincinnati Redlegs for Frank Thomas. Jackson wound up spending just one season in the Cincinnati organization before being acquired by the independent Toronto Maple Leafs. After one season with Maple Leafs, he was picked up by the Milwaukee Braves. He lasted just a single season with the Braves, and spent 1963 with the Washington Senators organization.

== Baltimore Orioles ==
After the 1963 season, he was drafted by the Orioles. He started the season with them, but played just four of the team's first 23 games. He spent the rest of 1964 and all of 1965 with the Rochester Red Wings, the Orioles' top minor league club.

== Japan ==
In 1966, Jackson signed with the Sankei Atoms. In his first season in Japan, he hit 20 home runs in 97 games, batting .254. In 1967, he improved to a .296 batting average, with 28 home runs. The following season, however, he slumped at the plate, hitting just .219, and one day collapsed at home plate while batting. He died the following year of pancreatitis at age 33.
