= Fan's Field =

Coordinates: 38.5326°N 89.1221°W

Fan's Field was a ballpark in Centralia, Illinois that served as the home field for the Centralia Cubs (1947-1949), Centralia Sterlings (1950) and Centralia Zeros (1951-1952). Fan's Field had a capacity of 2,500 and was located at the corner of East Rexford Street and Jackson Avenue. The park was adjacent to the Franklin Elementary School.
