= Highland Park Stadium =

Baseball stadium in Kokomo, Indiana

Coordinates: 40°28′01″N 86°08′25″W

- CFD Investments Stadium
- Kokomo Highland Park Stadium
- Interactive map of Highland Park Stadium
- Location: 900 West Defenbaugh Street, Kokomo, Indiana, 46902
- Capacity: 3,000 (Fixed seats); Unknown (Total)
- Field size: Right Field – 270 ft

Construction
- Groundbreaking: 1955
- Built: 1955
- Opened: 1955
- Renovated: 1985, 2014
- Expanded: 1985

Tenants
- Kokomo Dodgers (1956–1961); Kokomo Giants (1955)

Highland Park Stadium, also known as CFD Investments Stadium, is a minor league baseball stadium located in the Highland Park in Kokomo, Indiana, United States.

== History ==
Highland Park Stadium was built as the home of the Kokomo Giants in 1955, and then Kokomo Dodgers from 1956 to 1961. The stadium generally holds 3,000 people, but findable records show 7,000 people attended a game in 1961. The stadium received its first renovation in 1985, which added most of the bleachers that are there today. 1985 was also when it hosted a minor league world series game.

The stadium is currently used for American Legion Baseball.

== Tenants ==
- Kokomo Giants (1955)
- Kokomo Dodgers (1956–1961)
