= Canton Citizens =

US minor league baseball team (1952)

- 1952; Canton, Illinois

Minor league affiliations
- Class: Class D (1952)
- League: Mississippi–Ohio Valley League (1952)

Major league affiliations
- Team: None

Minor league titles
- League titles (0): None

Team data
- Name: Canton Citizens (1952)
- Ballpark: Athletic Park (1952)

The Canton Citizens were a minor league baseball team based in Canton, Illinois, United States. In 1952, the franchise was relocated from Vincennes, Indiana, during the season. The Canton Citizens played as members of the Class D level Mississippi–Ohio Valley League, predecessor to the Midwest League. The Citizens franchise then was disbanded after completing the 1952 season. Canton hosted 1952 minor league home games at Athletic Park.

== History ==
Preceded in Canton by the Canton Chinks, the "Canton Citizens" came into existence during the 1952 season. On June 7, 1952, the Vincennes Velvets of the Class D level Mississippi–Ohio Valley League moved to Canton with a 15–15 record. The Canton Chinks had preceded the Canton Citizens decades earlier, playing from 1908 to 1913. The 1952 Canton team is also reported to as being called the "Aces" in some references.

The Vincennes/Canton team finished in sixth place in the eight–team league, playing under managers Chuck Hawley and Bob Sisk. With an overall record of 54–70, the Vincennes/Canton team finished 31½ games behind the first place Danville Dans in the final standings. Canton permanently folded following the 1952 season, as the 1953 Mississippi–Ohio Valley League reduced to six teams.

Canton players Edward Gilde hit .303 with 90 RBI and McPherson Crum had 12 wins and 119 strikeouts to lead the team in 1952.

The Canton franchise did not return to the 1953 Mississippi-Ohio Valley League. Canton, Illinois has not hosted another minor league team.

== The ballpark ==
The 1952 Canton Citizens played home games at Canton Athletic Park. The Canton Athletic Park is still in use and is located at 900 First Avenue Canton, Illinois.

== Timeline ==
Year(s)	# Yrs.	Team	Level	League
1908–1911	4	Canton Chinks	Class D	Illinois-Missouri League
1912	1	Canton Highlanders	Class D	Illinois-Missouri League
1913	1	Canton Chinks	Class D	Illinois-Missouri League
1952	1	Canton Citizens	Class D	Mississippi-Ohio Valley League

== Year–by–year records ==
Year	Record	Finish	Manager	Playoffs/Notes
1952	54–70	6th	Chuck Hawley / Bob Sisk	Vincennes (15–15) moved to Canton June 7; 39–55 record in Canton

== Notable alumni ==
Chuck Hawley (1592, MGR)
