= NelsonCorp Field =

Stadium in Clinton, Iowa, United States

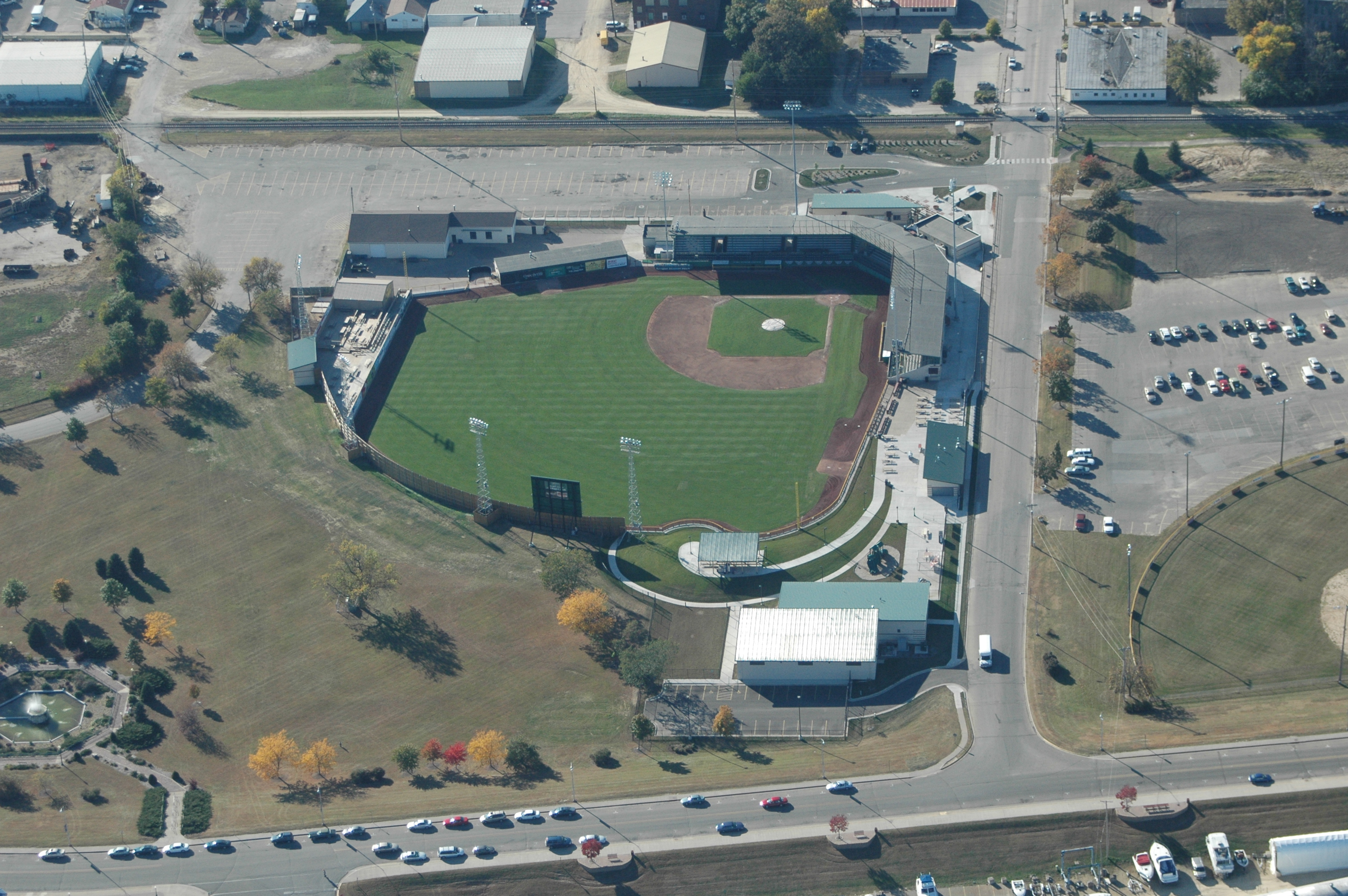

- Location within Iowa Location within the United States
- Interactive map of NelsonCorp Field
- Former names: LumberKings Stadium (2019); Ashford University Field (2011–2018); Alliant Energy Field (2002–2011); Riverview Stadium (1937–2001)
- Address: 537 Ballpark Drive; Clinton, Iowa 52732
- Coordinates: 41.849265°N 90.185394°W
- Owner: City of Clinton, Iowa
- Operator: Clinton Baseball Club, Inc. (Clinton LumberKings)
- Capacity: 5,500
- Surface: Kentucky Blue Grass
- Field size: Left field: 330 ft (100 m); Center field: 401 ft (122 m); Right field: 325 ft (99 m)

Construction
- Groundbreaking: November 29, 1935
- Opened: May 9, 1937
- Renovated: 2005–2006
- Cost: $150,000 ($3.36 million in 2025 dollars)
- Architects: Albert H. Morrell & Associates
- General contractor: Fred N. Grumstrup

Tenants
- Clinton Owls (IIIL) 1937–1941; Clinton LumberKings (MWL/PL) 1954–present Ashford Saints (NAIA) 2012–2016

NelsonCorp Field is a stadium in Clinton, Iowa. It is primarily used for baseball, and is operated by and is the home field of the Clinton LumberKings collegiate summer baseball team of the Prospect League. It was built in 1937 and its capacity is roughly 5,500 fans.

== History ==
The construction of Riverview Stadium began in 1935 and completed in 1937 as a Works Progress Administration project, and it beckoned baseball's return after a 19-year hiatus in the city. The Clinton Owls, a Brooklyn Dodgers affiliate in the Three-I League, christened the stadium with a first-place finish that season. The stadium was renamed Alliant Energy Field in 2002 and has undergone several renovation projects in recent years: replacement of entire field lighting system, new home clubhouse, installation of new drainage tiles, expansion of both dugouts and the renovation of covered batting cages. In 2006, the stadium underwent a $4.2 million renovation. On October 1, 2011, the stadium was renamed Ashford University Field. That naming rights deal ended after the 2018 season. The stadium was called LumberKings Stadium until a new naming rights deal was announced on May 27, 2019, making it NelsonCorp Field.

In 2009, the ballpark played host to the Midwest League All-Star Game as the East All-Stars defeated the West All-Stars 6–3 in front of 2,561 fans.

In 2016, in addition to playing host to the franchise record setting LumberKings (86–54), the field was transformed overnight following game two of the Midwest League Championship to become a football field. The LumberKings played host to Camanche High School Football in the inaugural "LumberBowl." Camanche hosted Williamsburg High School in the game on September 16, 2016. The Raiders of Williamsburg defeated the Indians 55–7.

Following the 2020 season, the LumberKings were cut from the Midwest League and affiliated baseball as part of Major League Baseball's reorganization of the minor leagues. They later joined the Prospect League, a collegiate summer baseball league, for 2021.

== Features ==
As of September 2, 2015, features of the stadium included the Leinenkugel's Lumber Lounge party deck located in right field, the Coors Light Picnic Pavilion and berm in left field, the Dr. Pepper Picnic Garden party area along the left field foul line and bullpen.
