= Verlon Walker =

Verlon "Rube" Walker
- Coach
- Born: March 7, 1929; Lenoir, North Carolina, U.S.
- Died: March 24, 1971 (aged 42); Chicago, Illinois, U.S.
- Batted: Left Threw: Right
- Stats at Baseball Reference

Teams
- Chicago Cubs (1961–1970)

Verlon Lee Walker (March 7, 1929 – March 24, 1971) was an American catcher in minor league baseball and a coach for the Chicago Cubs of Major League Baseball from 1961 through 1970. He was also known as Rube Walker, nicknamed after his more famous older brother Albert, who preceded him as a catcher in the Chicago farm system. Albert played 11 seasons in the Major Leagues with the Cubs and Brooklyn Dodgers, and was an MLB pitching coach for three clubs, most notably the New York Mets.

Born in Lenoir, North Carolina, Verlon Walker never rose higher than eleven total games in the Double-A Texas League and Southern Association as a minor league catcher (1948–50; 1953–61). He turned to managing in 1957 as the playing skipper of the Paris Lakers of the Class D Midwest League, where he enjoyed his finest season as a hitter, batting .321 with 20 home runs. A left-handed batter who threw right-handed, Walker stood 6 feet (1.8 m) tall and weighed 210 pounds (95 kg).

In 1961, he was appointed to the Cubs' College of Coaches, a rotating team of instructors and "head coaches" created as an experimental alternative to the traditional baseball hierarchy of a manager and a coaching staff. He was a member of this group for the five years of its existence, then was retained when Leo Durocher was named the Cubs' manager for 1966. However, that year Walker discovered he was suffering from acute myeloid leukemia. After treatments offered a remission from the illness, he served under Durocher through the 1970 season, initially as third-base coach before moving to the bullpen. Upon the retirement of Joe Becker, Walker was poised to become the Cubs' new pitching coach for 1971. But a recurrence of leukemia caused his death on March 24, 1971, in Chicago at the age of 42.

Upon his death, the Cubs established the Verlon "Rube" Walker Leukemia Center at Northwestern Memorial Hospital, which still exists today as the Rube Walker Blood Center.
