= Mississippi–Ohio Valley League =

Class D level American minor league baseball league

- Most recent season or competition: 1955 Mississippi-Ohio Valley League season
- Formerly: Illinois State League
- Classification: Class D (1949–1955)
- Sport: Minor League Baseball
- First season: 1949
- Folded: 1955
- Replaced by: Midwest League
- President: Dutch Hoffman (1949–1955)
- No. of teams: 23
- Country: United States of America
- Most titles: 2 Danville Dans (1951, 1954); Decatur Commodores (1952–1953)
- Related competitions: Illinois-Indiana-Iowa League

The Mississippi–Ohio Valley League was a Class D level American minor league baseball league. Evolving from the renamed Illinois State League (1947–1948), the Mississippi–Ohio Valley League operated for seven seasons, from 1949 through 1955. In 1956 the league was renamed the Midwest League, which still exists today.

== History ==
In 1947, the Illinois State League was formed. Charter franchises were in the Illinois cities of Belleville, Centralia, Marion, Mattoon, Mount Vernon and West Frankfort. After the 1948 season, the Marion Indians moved out of Illinois to Kentucky. This necessitated a name change for the league.

The league changed names in 1949 to the Mississippi–Ohio Valley League. The league incorporated the new Paducah Chiefs and the five former Illinois State League teams, the Belleville Stags, Centralia Cubs, Mattoon Indians, Mount Vernon Kings, and West Frankfort Cardinals as 1949 charter members.

In 1950, a Springfield, Illinois franchise left the Illinois–Indiana–Iowa League, the join the Mississippi–Ohio Valley League. The Mississippi–Ohio Valley League added expansion teams in the Paris Lakers and Vincennes Velvets. The Belleville franchise folded. There was more movement in 1951, as the Springfield Giants and West Frankfort Cardinals both folded and the Paducah Chiefs left to join the Kentucky–Illinois–Tennessee League. The league played 1951 with six teams, as Danville Dans joined from the Illinois–Indiana–Iowa League.

In 1952, the league again expanded to eight teams, adding the Commodores in Decatur, Illinois and Cardinals in Hannibal, Missouri, while Vincennes relocated to Canton, Illinois. In 1953, the Canton and Centralia franchises both folded and the league returned to six teams. There was expansion again in 1954, as two Iowa teams, the Clinton Pirates and Dubuque Packers returned the league to eight members.

In the final season of the league, the Mount Vernon Kings moved to Kokomo, Indiana and became the Kokomo Giants and the Danville Dans moved to Lafayette, Indiana as the Lafayette Red Sox. Following the 1955 season, Hannibal moved to become the Michigan City White Caps, joining Kokomo, Lafayette, Clinton, Dubuque, Decatur, Mattoon and Paris in the renamed Midwest League. The Midwest League still exists today, with 16 teams.

== Cities represented ==
- Belleville, Illinois: Belleville Stags 1949, moved from Illinois State League 1947–1948
- Canton, Illinois: Canton Citizens 1952
- Centralia, Illinois: Centralia Cubs 1949, moved from Illinois State League 1947–1948; Centralia Sterlings 1950; Centralia Zeros 1951–1952
- Clinton, Iowa: Clinton Pirates 1954–1955, moved to Midwest League 1956–1959
- Danville, Illinois: Danville Dans 1951–1954
- Decatur, Illinois: Decatur Commies 1952–1955, moved to Midwest League 1956–1974
- Dubuque, Iowa: Dubuque Packers 1954–1955, moved to Midwest League 1956–1967
- Hannibal, Missouri: Hannibal Stags 1952; Hannibal Cardinals 1953–1954; Hannibal Citizens 1955
- Kokomo, Indiana: Kokomo Giants 1955
- Lafayette, Indiana: Lafayette Chiefs 1955
- Mattoon, Illinois: Mattoon Indians 1949–1954, moved from Illinois State League 1947–1948; Mattoon Phillies 1955, moved to Midwest League 1956
- Mount Vernon, Illinois: Mount Vernon Kings 1949–1954
- Paducah, Kentucky: Paducah Chiefs 1949–1950, moved to Kitty League 1951–1955
- Paris, Illinois: Paris Lakers 1950–1955, moved to Midwest League 1956–1959
- Springfield, Illinois: Springfield Giants 1950
- Vincennes, Indiana: Vincennes Velvets 1950–1952
- West Frankfort, Illinois: West Frankfort Cardinals 1949–1950, moved from Illinois State League 1947–1948

== Standings & statistics ==
1949 Mississippi–Ohio Valley League

Team name	W	L	PCT	GB	Attend	Managers
Centralia Cubs	74	44	.627	–	35,000	Lou Bekeza
West Frankfort Cardinals	71	49	.592	4	24,140	Robert Stanton
Mattoon Indians	62	56	.525	12	38,325	Chuck Hawley
Paducah Chiefs	54	65	.454	20½	54,859	Caroll Peterson / Eddie Kearse
Mt. Vernon Kings	53	67	.442	22	36,240	Robert Shreve / Bill Trotter
Belleville Stags	43	76	.361	31½	13,500	Les Mueller / Joe Yurkovich / Addie Nesbit / Bunny Mick

Playoffs: Mattoon 3 games, Centralia 0; Paducah 3 games, West Frankfort 0;
Finals: Paducah 4 games, Mattoon 3.

Player statistics
Player	Team	Stat	Tot	Player	Team	Stat	Tot
Bunny Mick	Belleville	BA	.354	Joseph Prucha	Centralia	W	19
Ev Joyner	West Frankfort	Hits	170	Joseph Mattis	Mattoon	SO	166
Richard Martz	Paducah	RBI	100	Dick Loeser	West Frankfort	ERA	2.22
Arthur Oliver	Paducah	HR	17	Dick Loeser	West Frankfort	PCT	.857 12–2
Ev Joyner	West Frankfort	Runs	104				

1950 Mississippi–Ohio Valley League - schedule

Team name	W	L	PCT	GB	Attend	Managers
Centralia Sterlings	83	40	.675	–	35,767	Lou Bekeza
West Frankfort	72	47	.605	9	20,910	Robert Stanton
Mattoon Indians	71	47	.602	9½	27,982	Chuck Hawley
Paducah Chiefs	67	55	.549	15½	47,297	Walter DeFreitas
Springfield Giants	60	59	.504	21	21,126	Ham Schulte / Von Price
Paris Lakers	43	75	.364	37½	24,089	Earl Skaggs / Von Price; John Morris
Vincennes Citizens	43	76	.361	38	18,977	Melvin Ivy / Andy E. Smith
Mt. Vernon Kings	37	77	.325	41½	28,431	Benny Meyer / Robert Schlemmer

Playoffs: Centralia 3 games, Mattoon 1; Paducah 3 games, West Frankfort 0
Finals: Cancelled; Bad Weather & Military Call–up.

Player statistics
Player	Team	Stat	Tot	Player	Team	Stat	Tot
James Belz	West Frankfort	BA	.349	Gene Pisarski	Centralia	W	22
James Belz	West Frankfort	Hits	154	William Ecklund	Centralia	SO	174
Lou Bekeza	Centralia	RBI	120	Gene Pisarski	Centralia	ERA	2.06
Kenneth Dickens	Vincennes	HR	21	Gene Pisarski	Centralia	PCT	.880 22–3
James Belz	West Frankfort	Runs	133				

1951 Mississippi–Ohio Valley League

Team name	W	L	PCT	GB	Attend	Managers
Paris Lakers	84	36	.700	–	51,331	Tom Sunkel
Centralia Zeroes	69	51	.575	15	38,554	Lou Bekeza
Mt. Vernon Kings	60	59	.504	23½	39,665	Chuck Hawley / Charles Popovich
Danville Dans	51	67	.432	32	24,775	Frank Piet / Everett Hall
Mattoon Indians	49	69	.415	34	28,442	Melvin Ivy
Vincennes Velvets	43	74	.368	39½	25,652	Stormy Kromer / Robert Signaigo

Playoffs: Mt. Vernon 2 games, Centralia 0. Danville 2 games, Paris 1.
Finals: Danville 2 games, Mt. Vernon 0.

Player statistics
Player	Team	Stat	Tot	Player	Team	Stat	Tot
Clint McCord	Paris	BA	.363	Lee Tunnison	Centralia	W	20
Clint McCord	Paris	Hits	173	Lee Tunnison	Centralia	SO	170
James Given	Mt. Vernon	RBI	119	Lee Tunnison	Centralia	ERA	3.12
Clint McCord	Paris	HR	16	Fred Williams	Paris	PCT	.789 15–4
Clint McCord	Paris	Runs	132				
Lou Bekeza	Centralia	HR	16				

1952 Mississippi–Ohio Valley League - schedule

Team name	W	L	PCT	GB	Attend	Managers
Danville Dans	87	40	.685	–	75,898	Virl Minnis
Paris Lakers	85	42	.669	2	36,606	Tom Sunkel
Decatur Commodores	73	52	.584	13	94,300	Julian Acosta
Hannibal Stags	70	57	.551	17	36,616	Walter DeFreitas
Mt. Vernon Kings	55	67	.451	29½	34,752	James Granneman / Stanley Sadich; Frank Brookman
Vincennes Velvets / Canton Citizens	54	70	.435	31½	25,654	Chuck Hawley / Robert Sisk
Centralia Zeroes	41	83	.331	44½	28,755	Charles Starasta / John Streza
Mattoon Indians	35	89	.282	50½	49,316	Walter Dunkovich / Charles Popovich; Robert Carson

Vincennes moved to Canton June 7.
Playoffs: Hannibal 3 games, Danville 1. Decatur 3 games, Paris 2.
Finals: Decatur 3 games, Hannibal 1.

Player statistics
Player	Team	Stat	Tot	Player	Team	Stat	Tot
Clint McCord	Paris	BA	.392	Ken Gohn	Danville	W	22
Clint McCord	Paris	Hits	189	Amacio Ferro	Hannibal	SO	183
Jim Zapp	Paris	RBI	136	Ken Gohn	Danville	ERA	1.58
Jim Zapp	Paris	HR	20	James Agnew	Danville	PCT	.889 16–2
Quincy Smith	Paris	Runs	124				

1953 Mississippi–Ohio Valley League - schedule

Team name	W	L	PCT	GB	Attend	Managers
Decatur Commodores	68	50	.576	–	96,337	Ray Taylor
Paris Lakers	66	53	.555	2½	35,000	Tom Sunkel
Mattoon Phillies	64	56	.533	5	61,000	James Deery
Hannibal Cardinals	55	62	.470	12½	35,200	Tince Leonard
Mt. Vernon Kings	55	64	.462	13½	31,600	Robert Schmidt
Danville Dans	48	71	.403	20½	62,700	Virl Minnis

Playoffs: Decatur 3 games, Hannibal 0. Paris 3 games, Mattoon 0.
Finals: Decatur 3 games, Paris 2.

Player statistics
Player	Team	Stat	Tot	Player	Team	Stat	Tot
Robert Schmidt	Mt. Vernon	BA	.358	Juan Garcia; Tince Leonard	Decatur; Hannibal	W	18
James Partin	Danville	Hits	167	Dennis Hamilton	Mattoon	SO	195
James Freeman	Decatur	RBI	106	William Bright	Mattoon	ERA	2.51
Kenneth Payne	Paris	HR	16	Michael Rolls	Mt. Vernon	PCT	.824 14–3
Gonzalo Chenard	Decatur	Runs	105				

1954 Mississippi–Ohio Valley League - schedule

Team name	W	L	PCT	GB	Attend	Managers
Decatur Commodores	74	52	.587	–	38,776	Johnny Lucadello
Danville Dans	66	59	.528	7½	39,992	Richard Klaus
Clinton Pirates	63	59	.516	9	74,768	Robert Clark
Dubuque Packers	62	61	.504	10½	65,993	Jack Conway
Mattoon Phillies	62	64	.492	12	48,422	Carl Bush / Don Osborn
Paris Lakers	58	68	.460	16	39,103	Tom Sunkel
Hannibal Cardinals	58	68	.460	16	33,065	J.C. Dunn
Mt. Vernon Kings	57	69	.452	17	27,584	Lou Bekeza

Playoffs: Clinton 2 games, Decatur 0. Danville 2 games, Dubuque 1.
Finals: Danville 3 games, Clinton 1.

Player statistics
Player	Team	Stat	Tot	Player	Team	Stat	Tot
Johnny Lucadello	Decatur	BA	.362	John Bumgarner	Decatur	W	22
Leon Wagner	Danville	Hits	160	David Jiminez	Clinton	SO	249
Robert Schmidt	Paris	RBI	125	John Bumgarner	Decatur	ERA	2.67
J.C. Dunn	Hannibal	HR	26	David Jimenez	Clinton	PCT	.769 20–6
Leon Wagner	Danville	Runs	108				

1955 Mississippi–Ohio Valley League - schedule

Team name	W	L	PCT	GB	Attend	Managers
Dubuque Packers	74	52	.587	–	94,925	Ira Hutchinson
Mattoon Phillies	68	57	.544	5½	51,277	Burl Storie
Clinton Pirates	68	57	.544	5½	57,683	Robert Clark
Kokomo Giants	64	62	.508	10	45,289	Walt Dixon / Jack Milaskey
Lafayette Chiefs	63	63	.500	11	61,287	Mark Wylie
Decatur Commodores	62	64	.492	12	54,260	Al Unser
Paris Lakers	62	64	.492	12	30,245	Richard Rigazio
Hannibal Citizens	42	84	.333	32	40,977	James Granneman / Allan Shinn

Playoffs: Dubuque 2 games, Clinton 0. Mattoon 2 games, Kokomo 0.
Finals: Dubuque 3 games, Mattoon 0.

Player statistics
Player	Team	Stat	Tot	Player	Team	Stat	Tot
Orlando Cepeda	Kokomo	BA	.393	Allen Evans	Kokomo	W	21
Jimmy Lynn	Dubuque	Hits	180	Benjamin Rich	Clinton	SO	199
Jimmy Lynn	Dubuque	RBI	121	Dave Wegerek	Lafayette	ERA	2.59
Walt Dixon	Kokomo	HR	24	Glen Rosenbaum	Dubuque	PCT	.833 15–3
Jimmy Lynn	Dubuque	Runs	121				

Following the 1955 season, Hannibal folded. The other seven teams became charter members of the newly named, Class D level Midwest League and the Mississippi–Ohio Valley League was permanently folded.
