= Tom Sunkel =

American baseball player (1912–2002)

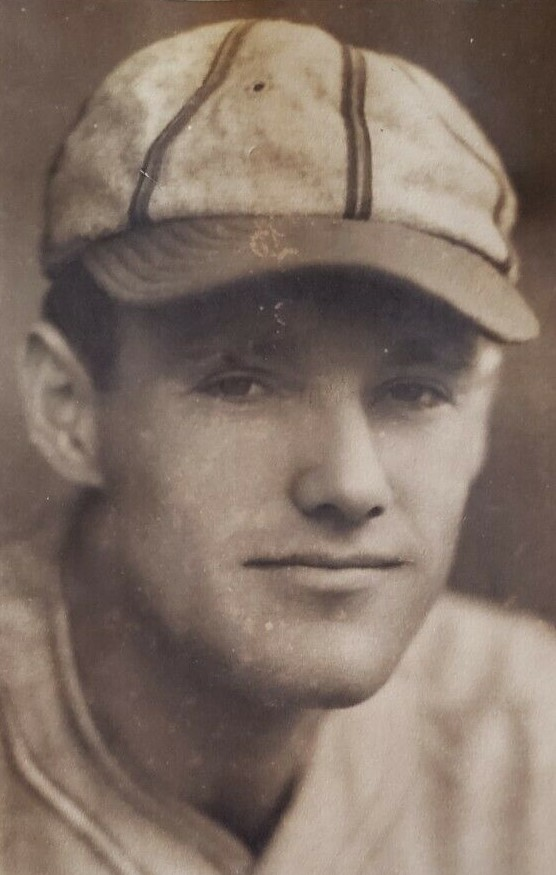
- Pitcher
- Born: August 9, 1912; Paris, Illinois, U.S.
- Died: April 6, 2002 (aged 89); Paris, Illinois, U.S.
- Batted: Left Threw: Left

MLB debut
- August 26, 1937, for the St. Louis Cardinals

Last MLB appearance
- September 29, 1944, for the Brooklyn Dodgers

MLB statistics
- Win–loss record: 9–15
- Earned run average: 4.53
- Strikeouts: 112
- Stats at Baseball Reference

Teams
- St. Louis Cardinals (1937, 1939); New York Giants (1941–1943); Brooklyn Dodgers (1944)

Thomas Jacob Sunkel (August 9, 1912 – April 6, 2002) was an American professional baseball player who was a pitcher in the Major Leagues from 1937 to 1944. He would play for the St. Louis Cardinals, New York Giants, and Brooklyn Dodgers.

Sunkel's left eye was damaged when he was a child, and he eventually lost all sight in this eye by 1941. He pitched and batted with his head cocked to the side to compensate.

Sunkel was born and died in Paris, Illinois.
