= Centralia Zeros =

The Centralia Zeroes were a Mississippi–Ohio Valley League baseball team based in Centralia, Illinois, USA that played from 1951 to 1952. They played their home games at Fan's Field.
