= Decatur Commodores =

- Founded in 1900; Decatur, Illinois

Minor league affiliations
- Previous classes: Class-A (1963–74); Class-D (1952–1962); Class-B (1902–1909; 1911–15; 1922–1932; 1935; 1937–48)
- Previous leagues: Midwest League (1956–1974) Mississippi–Ohio Valley League (1952-55); Illinois–Indiana–Iowa League (Three-I) (1901–1909; 1911–1915; 1922–1932; 1935; 1937–1942; 1946–50); Northern Association (1910); Central League (1900); Illinois-Indiana league (1889); Central Interstate League (1888)

Major league affiliations
- Previous teams: San Francisco Giants (1962–1974); Detroit Tigers (1957–1961; 1932); St. Louis Cardinals (1955–56; 1946–47; 1937–1942); Cincinnati Reds (1950); Chicago Cubs (1948–49)

Minor league titles
- League titles (4): 1928; 1952; 1953; 1957

Team data
- Name: Commodores (60 Seasons)
- Previous names: Decatur Cubs (1949); Decatur Nomads (1911); Unknown (1888-89)
- Previous parks: Fans Field (1927–1974); Staley Field (1922-1926); Downing Racetrack (1911-1915)

The Decatur Commodores were a professional minor league baseball team based in Decatur, Illinois that played for 64 seasons. The Commodores are the primary ancestor of today's Kane County Cougars. They played, with sporadic interruptions, from 1900 to 1974 in a variety of minor leagues, but spent the majority of their existence in the Illinois–Indiana–Iowa League (the "Three-I" League), later joining the Mississippi–Ohio Valley League (1952–1955) and the Midwest League (1956–1974). While they spent most of their years as an independent without formal major league baseball team affiliation, their primary affiliations were with the St. Louis Cardinals and later the San Francisco Giants, with isolated affiliations with the Detroit Tigers, Chicago Cubs and Philadelphia Phillies.

== The ballparks ==
The Commodores played home games at Fans Field (1924–1974). Fans Field had a 5,200-seat grandstand which was demolished when the team moved to Wausau, Wisconsin in 1974 and became the Wausau Timbers. The field is still being used as a softball field.

Before the 1927 construction of Fans Field, the Commodores played at Racetrack Ballpark (1911-1915) and Staley Field (1922–1926). They shared Staley Field with the football team for which it was built, the Decatur Staleys. The Staleys were the early NFL franchise started by A.E. Staley and headed by George Halas that relocated from Decatur in 1922 and became the Chicago Bears.

The Commodores began play at Downing Racetrack (now called Hess Park) in 1901. The ball club played at the racetrack until 1915, but a tornado destroyed the grandstand on July 15. The structure was razed, but the Commies continued to play until ceasing operations on August 10.

== Commodores nickname ==
The nickname Commodores refers to Stephen Decatur, for whom the city is named. The team was often called the "Commies" for short, from a time before that became a slang term for "Communist". In their final years, they wore hand-me-down Giants uniforms, although still called the "Commodores", leading some fans to call them the "Commodore Giants".

== League Championships ==
- 1928 – Illinois–Indiana–Iowa League Champions
- 1952 – Mississippi-Ohio Valley League Champions
- 1953 – Mississippi-Ohio Valley League Champions
- 1957 – Midwest League Champions

== No-hitters ==
The following no-hitters were pitched by Decatur pitchers in Midwest League play.

Date	Pitcher	Opponent	Score	Notes	Ref
May 31, 1952	Ed Garrett	Mt. Vernon	5–1		
July 28, 1954	John Bumgarner	Clinton	1–0		
August 3, 1958	Jerry Fields	Clinton	5–0		
August 18, 1960	Bob Sprout	Waterloo	3–0	22 strikeouts	
June 20, 1961	Vern Orndorff	Clinton	3–0	7 Innings, Perfect Game	
August 13, 1963	Ollie Brown	Wisconsin Rapids	8–0		
June 7, 1966	Jesse Huggins	Wisconsin Rapids	1–0	7 Innings	
August 15, 1969	Gary Lavelle	Clinton	4–0	7 Innings	
May 31, 1972	Doug Capilla	Appleton	1–0	7 Innings	
June 12, 1974	Jeff Little	Dubuque	1–0	7 Innings	

== Notable alumni ==
=== Baseball Hall of Fame alumni ===
- Carl Hubbell (1927) Inducted, 1947

=== Other notable alumni ===
- Morrie Arnovich (1949–1950 MGR) MLB AS
- Ray Benge (1926)
- Buddy Blattner (1939) Inducted Missouri Sports Hall of Fame (1980)
- Ollie Brown (1962–63)
- Don Bryant (1961)
- Ron Bryant (1966) 1973 NL Wins Leader
- Bud Byerly (1941)
- Charlie Case (1908)
- Bob Clear – 1947
- John D'Acquisto (1971) 1974 NL Rookie Pitcher of the Year
- Rube Dessau (1928–1931 MGR)
- Murry Dickson (1936–38) MLB All-Star
- Ben Dyer (1912–13)
- Ed Figueroa (1970)
- Jim Freeman (1952–54) First Black Decatur player
- Tito Fuentes (1963)
- Heinie Groh (1911)
- Johnny Groth (1961, MGR)
- Odell Hale (1930)
- Ed Halicki (1972)
- Jack Hamilton (1957)
- Grover Hartley (1910)
- Bob Hartsfield (1974, MGR)
- Beany Jacobson (1903, 1908–09)
- Oscar Judd (1939) MLB All-Star
- Eddie Lake (1938)
- Gary Lavelle (1969) 2 x MLB All-Star
- Johnnie LeMaster (1974)
- Dutch Leonard (1932) 4 x MLB All-Star
- Grover Lowdermilk (1909–10)
- Bob Knepper (1973) 2 x MLB All-Star
- Gary Matthews (1969) MLB All-Star; 1973 NL Rookie of the Year
- Frank McCormick (1935) 8 x MLB All-Star; 1939 NL Runs Batted In Leader; 1940 NL Most Valuable Player
- Hal McKain (1928)
- Butch Metzger (1972) 1976 NL Rookie of the Year
- John Montefusco (1973) MLB All-Star; 1975 NL Rookie of the Year
- Skeeter Newsome (1932)
- Jim Northrup (1961)
- Tom Oliver (1925)
- Jimmy Outlaw (1935)
- Claude Passeau (1932) 3 x MLB All-Star; 1939 AL Strikeouts Leader
- Jim Rooker (1960)
- Bob Scheffing (1938)
- Dick Sisler (1941) MLB All-Star
- Elías Sosa (1969)
- Denny Sothern (1925)
- Mickey Stanley (1961) 4 x Gold Glove
- Max Surkont (1940)
- Emil Verban (1939) 2 x MLB All-Star
- Pinky Whitney (1925–26) MLB All-Star

== Memorable games ==
- May 30, 1909 – The Commodores win a 26-inning, 5-hour marathon over the Bloomington Bloomers 2–1. The 26 innings stays the record for the most innings in a completed professional game in the United States for 57 years.
- August 18, 1960 – 18-year-old, left-handed pitcher Bob Sprout of the Commodores pitched a no hitter against the Waterloo Hawks. In that game, Sprout struck out 22 hitters, which stands as the MWL single-game strikeout record. The Commies won by a 3–0 score.

== In fiction ==
The Commodores appear in Harry Turtledove's Worldwar series, an alternate history in which aliens invade Earth in 1942 and the Second World War turns into an interplanetary war. Members of the team are on a train which the aliens attack at the beginning of the invasion. One ball player is kidnapped by the invaders and is eventually taken by them to China, while another player and the team's manager escape and join the forces fighting the invasion. A considerable part of the series is described from these three characters' points of view, in which their baseball background plays a significant role in a number of ways.

== See also ==
- Fans Field - Home of the Commodores
