= Mount Vernon Kings =

- 1910–1954; (1910, 1947–1954); Mount Vernon, Illinois

Minor league affiliations
- Previous classes: Class D ( 1910, 1947–1954)
- Previous leagues: Mississippi–Ohio Valley League (1949–1954); Illinois State League (1947–1948); Southern Illinois League (1910)

Major league affiliations
- Previous teams: Boston Braves (1947–1948)

Team data
- Previous names: Mount Vernon Kings (1949–1954); Mount Vernon Braves (1947-1948); Mount Vernon Merchants (1910)
- Previous parks: Braves Field (1947-1948); Renamed Veterans Park in 1949 (Mount Vernon, Illinois)

The Mount Vernon Kings was the final moniker of the minor league baseball teams based in Mount Vernon, Illinois, U.S. between 1910 and 1954. Mount Vernon last played as members of the Mississippi–Ohio Valley League from 1949 to 1954, a league that evolved into today's Midwest League. Mount Vernon teams previously played as members of the Southern Illinois League in 1910 and Illinois State League in 1947 and 1948. The Mount Vernon franchise permanently folded after the 1954 season.

== The ballpark ==
The Mount Vernon Braves played their minor league home games at Braves Field 1947-1948. Braves Field was renamed Veterans Park in 1949, when the team became the Mount Vernon Kings. Veterans Park hosted Mississippi-Ohio Valley League All-Star Games in 1949 and 1951.

== No hitter ==
On September 4, 1951, Stanley Burat threw a no-hitter against the Centralia Zeros, winning 10–0.

== Notable alumni ==
- Roy Lee (1953)
- Chuck Hawley (1951,1954) Played Professional Basketball
- Billy Queen (1947-1948)
- Otto Huber (1947)
- Don Liddle (1947)
- Jose Colas (1954)
- Roy Hawes (1947)
