= Centralia Sterlings =

The Centralia Sterlings were a Mississippi–Ohio Valley League baseball team based in Centralia, Illinois, USA that played in 1950. They played their home games at Fan's Field. They finished first in the league in their only year of existence, however the finals for the league playoffs against the Paducah Chiefs were canceled.
