= Paris Lakers =

- 1950–1959; Paris, Illinois

Minor league affiliations
- Class: Class D (1950–1959)
- League: Midwest League (1956–1959); Mississippi–Ohio Valley League (1950–1955)

Major league affiliations
- Team: Chicago Cubs (1955–1959)

Minor league titles
- League titles (1): 1956
- Conference titles (1): 1951
- Wild card berths (3): 1952; 1953; 1956

Team data
- Name: Paris Lakers (1950–1959)
- Ballpark: Laker Stadium (1950-1959)

The Paris Lakers were a minor league baseball team based in Paris, Illinois from 1950 to 1959. The Lakers played as members of the Midwest League from 1956 to 1959 and its predecessor, the Mississippi–Ohio Valley League from 1950 to 1955. The Lakers won the first Midwest League championship in 1956. The Paris Lakers were a minor league affiliate of the Chicago Cubs from 1955 to 1959.

== History ==
The Lakers were preceded in Paris, Illinois by the 1908 Paris Parisians, who played as a member of the Class D level Eastern Illinois League.

The Paris Lakers were an original franchise in the 1956 Midwest League, having previously had played in the Mississippi–Ohio Valley League, the predecessor of the Midwest League.

From 1950 to 1954, the Lakers played as a non-affiliated team, and from 1955 to 1959, they were affiliated with the Chicago Cubs.

Paris finished 85–42 in the 1952 Mississippi–Ohio Valley League, to place 2nd. Their manager from 1950 to 1954 was Paris native Tom Sunkel.

The Lakers won the first ever Midwest League championship in 1956, defeating the Dubuque Packers 3 games to 1 in the Finals.

On August 18, 1957 Kenneth Rollins threw a no-hitter against the Michigan City White Caps, winning 12–0.

== The ballpark ==
The Lakers' home field was Laker Stadium. Laker Stadium hosted the 1951 Mississippi–Ohio Valley League All-Star Game. The ballfield and part of the original stands are still in use today at the stadium, which sits within Twin Lakes Park. The address is 137 West Steidl Road, Paris, Illinois.

== Timeline ==
Year(s)	# Yrs.	Team	Level	League	Affiliate
1950–1954	5	Paris Lakers	Class D	Mississippi–Ohio Valley League	None
1955	1	Paris Lakers	Class D	Mississippi–Ohio Valley League	Chicago Cubs
1956–1959	4	Paris Lakers	Class D	Midwest League	Chicago Cubs

== Year–by–year records ==
Year	Record	Finish	Manager(s)	Playoffs / notes
1950	43–675	6th	Earl Skaggs / Von Price / John Morris	Did not qualify
1951	84–36	1st	Tom Sunkel	Lost in 1st round
1952	82–42	2nd	Tom Sunkel	Lost in 1st Round
1953	66–53	2nd	Tom Sunkel	Lost in Finals
1954	58–68	6th	Tom Sunkel	Did not qualify
1955	62–64	7th	Richard Rigazio	Did not qualify
1956	73–52	2nd	Marty Purtell	League champions
1957	51–473	7th	Verlon Walker	Did not qualify
1958	64–61	4th	Verlon Walker	Did not qualify
1959	57–68	6th	Verlon Walker	Did not qualify

== Notable alumni ==
- Tony Balsamo (1959)
- Doc Bracken (1953–1954)
- Harvey Branch (1958–1959)
- Dick Burwell (1959)
- John Buzhardt (1955)
- Jack Curtis (1956)
- Dave Gerard (baseball) (1955)
- Bob Giggie (1951)
- Lou Johnson (1958)
- Mike Krsnich (1950–1951)
- Nelson Mathews (1959)
- Moe Morhardt (1959)
- Don Prince (1958)
- Marty Purtell (1956, MGR)
- Joe Schaffernoth (1956)
- Johnnie Seale (1959)
- Quincy Smith (1951–1954)
- Morrie Steevens (1959)
- Tom Sunkel (1950–1954, MGR)
- Harry Taylor (1955)
- Verlon Walker (1957–1959, MGR)
- Jim Zapp (1952)

=== See also ===
Paris Lakers players
