= Peru (Indiana baseball) =

- 1890; Peru, Indiana

Minor league affiliations
- Class: Independent (1890)
- League: Indiana State League (1890)

Major league affiliations
- Team: None

Minor league titles
- League titles (0): None

Team data
- Name: Peru (1890)
- Ballpark: Unknown (1890)

The Peru team was a minor league baseball team based in Peru, Indiana. In 1890, the "Peru" team played as members of the eight–team Independent level Indiana State League and were without a team moniker, common in the era. The formal name of the team was the "Peru Baseball Club."

== History ==
Peru, Indiana began minor league play in 1890, when the "Peru" team became members of the eight–team Independent level Indiana State League, as the league reformed. The Anderson, Bluffton, Elkhart, Fort Wayne Reds, Kokomo, Marion and Muncie teams joined with Peru in beginning league play.

As was common in the era, the "Peru Baseball Club" had no formal nickname.

On July 24, 1890, the Indiana State League folded after the Bluffton and Elkhart teams had disbanded, leaving the league with six teams. Peru finished last in the standings. Peru completed the season with a record of 25–35, playing under managers Charles Farrell, Ace Stewart, Louis Johnson and Edward Egan to place sixth, finishing 11.5 games behind the first place Anderson team.

The final 1890 Indiana State League standings were leb by Anderson (38–25), followed by Muncie (33–29), the Fort Wayne Reds (33–30), Kokomo (29–29), Marion/Logansport (29–29) and Peru (25–35). Bluffton (25–21) and Elkhart (14–28) weren't counted in the final standings after folding.

The Indiana State League did not return to play in 1891. The league reformed in 1896 without a Peru team. Peru, Indiana has not hosted another minor league team.

== The ballpark ==
The name of the 1890 Peru home minor league ballpark is not known.

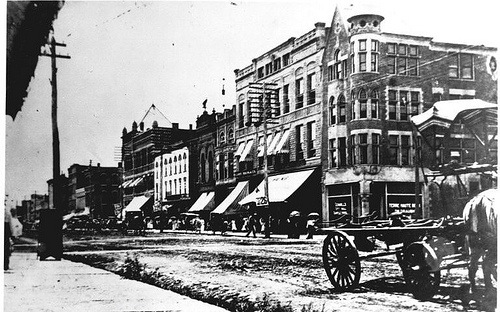
(1900) Peru, Indiana.

== Year-by-year record ==
| Year | Record | Finish | Manager | Playoffs/notes |
|---|---|---|---|---|
| 1890 | 25–35 | 6th | Charles Farrell / Ace Stewart; Louis Johnson / Edward Egan | League folded July 24 |

== Notable alumni ==
- Hal Mauck (1890)
- Ace Stewart (1890)
- Peru (minor league baseball) players
