= Everett Scott =

American baseball player (1892–1960)

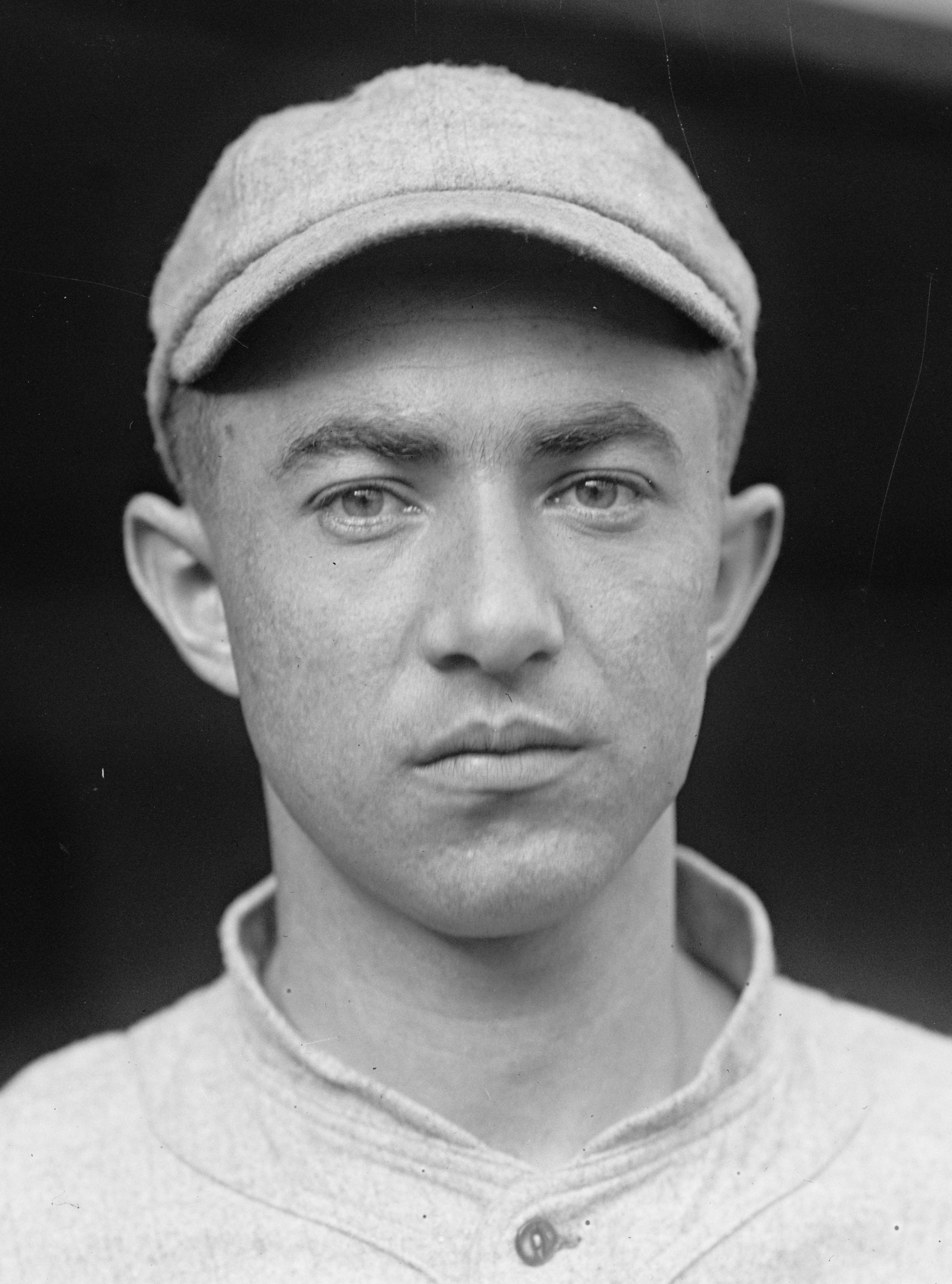
- Scott in 1915
- Shortstop
- Born: November 19, 1892; Bluffton, Indiana, U.S.
- Died: November 2, 1960 (aged 67); Fort Wayne, Indiana, U.S.
- Batted: Right Threw: Right

MLB debut
- April 14, 1914, for the Boston Red Sox

Last MLB appearance
- July 27, 1926, for the Cincinnati Reds

MLB statistics
- Batting average: .249
- Home runs: 20
- Runs batted in: 551
- Stats at Baseball Reference

Teams
- Boston Red Sox (1914–1921); New York Yankees (1922–1925); Washington Senators (1925); Chicago White Sox (1926); Cincinnati Reds (1926)

Career highlights and awards
- 4x World Series champion (1915, 1916, 1918, 1923); Boston Red Sox Hall of Fame

Lewis Everett Scott (November 19, 1892 – November 2, 1960), nicknamed "Deacon", was an American professional baseball player. A shortstop, Scott played in Major League Baseball for 12 seasons as a member of the Boston Red Sox, New York Yankees, Washington Senators, Chicago White Sox and Cincinnati Reds, from 1914 through 1926. Scott batted and threw right-handed.

Scott served as captain of both the Red Sox and Yankees, who have become fierce rivals. He compiled a lifetime batting average of .249, hitting 20 home runs with 551 runs batted in in 1,654 games. He led American League shortstops in fielding percentage seven straight seasons (1916–22) and appeared in 1,307 consecutive games from June 20, 1916, through May 5, 1925, setting a record later broken by Lou Gehrig. As of 2026, it is still the third-longest streak in history.

After retiring from baseball, Scott became a professional bowler and owned bowling alleys. He died in Fort Wayne, Indiana, at the age of 67. He was posthumously inducted into the Indiana Baseball Hall of Fame and Boston Red Sox Hall of Fame.

== Early life ==
Scott was born in Bluffton, Indiana. He had two brothers and a sister. His father, Lewis, had moved to Bluffton from Warren, Indiana, shortly before Everett's birth. Lewis' brother, Frame, had been a baseball player when he was younger.

Scott attended Bluffton High School, where he played for the school's baseball and basketball teams. He graduated in 1909. Scott married his high school sweetheart, Gladys Watt, in 1912.

== Career ==
=== Early career ===
After graduating from Bluffton, Scott made his professional baseball debut in Minor League Baseball with the Kokomo Wild Cats of the Class D Northern State of Indiana League in 1909. He moved to the Fairmont Champions of the Class D Pennsylvania–West Virginia League for the remainder of the 1909 season. He began the 1910 season with Fairmont, and completed the season with Kokomo. He joined the Youngstown Steelmen of the Class C Ohio–Pennsylvania League in 1911, and remained with them in 1912, when they played in the Class B Central League.

Jimmy McAleer, a native of Youngstown and minority owner of the Boston Red Sox of the American League (AL), noticed Scott playing for the Steelmen. On McAleer's suggestion, the Red Sox purchased Scott from Youngstown after the 1912 season, and optioned him to the St. Paul Saints of the Class AA American Association. Towards the end of the 1913 season, the Red Sox recalled Scott.

Bill Phillips, manager of the Indianapolis Hoosiers of the outlaw Federal League, attempted to convince Scott to jump from the AL after the 1913 season by offering Scott a $4,000 contract ($130,303 today). Scott remained with the Red Sox, signing a contract for $2,500 ($80,357 today) for the 1914 season.

=== Boston Red Sox ===
Scott made his major league debut on April 14, 1914, for the Red Sox, and had a .239 batting average with strong fielding as a rookie. His batting average dropped to .201 in the 1915 season. The Red Sox won the AL pennant, and defeated the Philadelphia Phillies in the 1915 World Series. Scott had one hit in 18 at bats during the series.

On June 20, 1916, Scott began a consecutive games played streak. Scott batted .232 in the 1916 season and led all AL shortstops in fielding percentage. In the 1916 World Series, the Red Sox defeated the Brooklyn Robins. Scott had two hits in 16 at bats, and Wilbert Robinson of the Robins nicknamed Scott "Trolley Wire" due to his accurate throws.

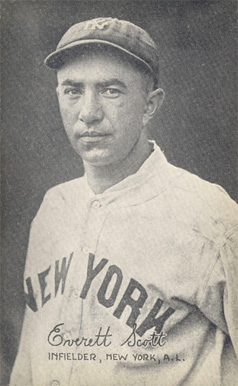
Scott with the Yankees in 1922

After a contract dispute, when Scott refused a pay cut from the Red Sox, Scott signed a contract for the 1918 season. He batted .241 in 1917, while leading AL shortstops in fielding percentage and defensive games played, but the Red Sox did not win the pennant. Scott batted .221 in the 1918 season, while leading AL shortstops in fielding percentage for the third consecutive season, as the Red Sox won the 1918 World Series. In April 1919, Scott signed a three-year contract with the Red Sox. Scott led AL shortstops in fielding percentage for the fourth consecutive season in 1919, and batted .278, the highest average of his career.

Scott broke George Pinkney's MLB consecutive games played streak of 577 on April 26, 1920. He again led AL shortstops in fielding percentage. The Red Sox named Scott team captain for the 1921 season, after the previous captain, Harry Hooper, was traded to the Chicago White Sox. During spring training in 1921, Scott dealt with leg cramp that threatened his playing streak, but he was able to continue playing. Scott had 62 runs batted in on the season, and stated that it was his goal to play in 1,000 consecutive games.

=== New York Yankees ===
After the 1921 season, the Red Sox traded Scott with Bullet Joe Bush and Sad Sam Jones to the New York Yankees for Rip Collins, Roger Peckinpaugh, Bill Piercy, Jack Quinn and $100,000 ($1,805,037 in current dollar terms). Del Pratt succeeded Scott as captain of the Red Sox.

After Peckinpaugh, the captain of the Yankees, was traded, Babe Ruth was named the new team captain. Ruth was suspended in May 1922 and Scott was named captain in Ruth's place. Scott remained the Yankees' captain through 1925.

Scott played with the Yankees in the 1922 World Series. He entered the 1923 season 14 games shy of his goal of 1,000 consecutive games played, but sprained his ankle during spring training. He played on Opening Day at the newly opened Yankee Stadium, recording the first assist in the stadium's history. He played his 1,000th consecutive MLB game on May 2, 1923. U.S. Secretary of the Navy Edwin C. Denby presented Scott with a gold medal during a pregame ceremony. Scott broke Perry Lipe's record for consecutive professional baseball games (regardless of level) with his 1,127th game on September 14, 1923; Lipe was a career minor leaguer who never played at the MLB level. By the following offseason, manager Miller Huggins began to consider ending Scott's streak. Huggins benched Scott on May 6, 1925, in favor of Pee Wee Wanninger, ending his record consecutive games played streak at 1,307.

=== Later career ===
The Washington Senators selected Scott off waivers from the New York Yankees in June 1925, paying the Yankees the waiver price of $4,000 ($73,435 today). With the Senators, Scott served as Peckinpaugh's backup. The Senators reached the 1925 World Series, but lost to the Pittsburgh Pirates; Scott did not appear in the series.

Though it was reported that Scott would retire to manage his business in Fort Wayne, Indiana, the Chicago White Sox signed Scott in February 1926. The Cincinnati Reds purchased Scott from the White Sox in July 1926. He played in four games for the Reds.

Scott signed with the Baltimore Orioles of the International League for the 1927 season, receiving his unconditionally release on August 4. He signed with the Toledo Mud Hens of the American Association in August, and played in 33 games for them. Toledo released him after the season. Scott played with the Reading Keystones of the International League in 1928, batting .315. Scott returned to the Keystones in 1929, but received his release in July 1929 after 62 games, due to the team's disappointing play.

== Later life ==
Scott was an avid bowler, and he competed in ten-pin bowling events sanctioned by the American Bowling Congress. He bowled against professional Hank Marino in 1931, though he lost. Scott also owned bowling alleys in Fort Wayne. He wrote a children's book, called Third Base Thatcher, that was published in 1928.

Lou Gehrig, a former teammate of Scott's on the Yankees, surpassed Scott's record of consecutive games played on August 17, 1933, in a game against the St. Louis Browns. Gehrig's streak began in 1925, by pinch hitting for Wanninger, the same season Scott's streak ended. Scott attended the game at Sportsman's Park as a special guest of the Browns. Scott died in Parkview Hospital in Fort Wayne, Indiana at age 67. He was posthumously inducted into the Indiana Baseball Hall of Fame in 1986, and the Boston Red Sox Hall of Fame in 2008. The News-Sentinel named Scott the fourth-best athlete from Northeastern Indiana of the 20th century.

== See also ==
- List of Major League Baseball consecutive games played leaders
- List of Boston Red Sox captains
- List of New York Yankees captains

Preceded by Babe Ruth	New York Yankees team captain 1922 to 1925	Succeeded by Lou Gehrig
