= Lafayette, Indiana minor league baseball history =

Lafayette, Indiana minor league baseball teams
- 1909–1994; (1909–1911, 1955–1957, 1994); Lafayette, Indiana

Minor league affiliations
- Class: Class D (1909–1911, 1955–1957); Inddpendent (1994)
- League: Northern State of Indiana League (1909–1911); Mississippi–Ohio Valley League (1955); Midwest League (1956–1957); Great Central League (1994)

Major league affiliations
- Team: Cleveland Indians (1955); Boston Red Sox (1956–1957)

Minor league titles
- League titles (2): 1909; 1994
- Wild card berths (1): 1956

Team data
- Name: Lafayette Maroons (1909); Lafayette Farmers (1910–1911); Lafayette Chiefs (1955); Lafayette Red Sox (1956–1957); Lafayette Leopards (1994)
- Ballpark: Loeb Stadium (1955–1957)

Minor league baseball teams were based in Lafayette, Indiana in various seasons between 1909 and 1994. Known under various nicknames, Lafayette teams played as members of the Northern State of Indiana League from 1909 to 1911, the Mississippi–Ohio Valley League in 1955, the Midwest League in 1956 and 1957 and 1994 Great Central League, winning two league championships.

Lafayette played as a minor league affiliate of the Cleveland Indians in 1955 and Boston Red Sox in 1956 and 1957.

Beginning in 1955, Lafayette played minor league home games at Loeb Stadium.

== History ==
=== 1909 to 1911: Northern State of Indiana League ===
Lafayette, Indiana first hosted minor league baseball with the 1909 Lafayette Maroons. The Lafayette Maroons were members of the six–team Class D level Northern State of Indiana League. The Maroons finished as co–league champions in their first season. The Bluffton Babes, Huntington Johnnies, Kokomo Wild Cats, Marion Boosters and Wabash Whitecaps joined Lafayette in league play. The Maroons finished the 1909 season with a record of 66–39, playing under manager Pete Driver. The Bluffton Babes with a 65–38 (.631) record and the Lafayette Maroons with a 66–39 record (.629) tied for first place in the standings, as no playoffs were held. The teams finished 6.0 games ahead of the third place Huntington Johnnies in the final standings.

Continuing play in 1910, the Lafayette Farmers placed third in the Northern State of Indiana League final standings after the league realigned during the season. The Farmers finished the season with a 39–30 record under managers Fred Payne and Carl Cominger. In 1910, the Northern State of Indiana League began the season with four teams. On July 2, 1910, the Bluffton Babes and Marion Booster franchises joined league play and games played prior to July 1, 1910, were not counted in the standings. The Wabash Rockeries won the league championship with a 46–25 record, finishing 3.5 games ahead of the second place Bluffton Babes and 6.0 games ahead of the third place Lafayette Farmers.

The Lafayette Farmers continued play in 1911, as the Northern State of Indiana League folded during the season. Lafayette was in fourth place when the 1911 Northern State of Indiana League folded during the season. On July 29, 1911, the Farmers had a record of 28–37 under Carl Cominger when the league permanently folded. Lafayette finished 13.0 games behind the first place Marion Boosters in the final standings.

=== 1955: Mississippi–Ohio Valley League ===
Minor league play next returned to Lafayette, Indiana in 1955. The 1955 the Lafayette Chiefs began play in the Mississippi–Ohio Valley League, playing as an affiliate of the Cleveland Indians. The Lafayette Chiefs became members of the eight–team Class D level Mississippi–Ohio Valley League, joining the Clinton Pirates, Decatur Commodores, Dubuque Packers, Hannibal Citizens, Kokomo Giants, Mattoon Indians and Paris Lakers in league play. The Chiefs ended the season with a 63–63 record, finishing in fifth place, playing the season under manager Mark Wylie and finishing 11.0 games behind the first place Dubuque Packers. Lafayette had home attendance of 61,287 fans for the season.

=== 1956 & 1957: Midwest League ===
Continuing minor league play in 1956, Lafayette qualified for the playoffs in a newly named league. Layafette became an affiliate of the Boston Red Sox, adopting the corresponding Lafayette Red Sox nickname. The franchise remained a member as the Mississippi–Ohio Valley League changed its league name to become the Midwest League, which continued play as a Class D level league. The Clinton Pirates, Decatur Commodores, Dubuque Packers, Kokomo Dodgers, Mattoon Phillies, Michigan City White Caps and Paris Lakers were the other Midwest League charter members. The Lafayette Red Sox placed second in the initial Midwest League standings with a 69–56 record, playing under manager Len Okrie. In the playoffs, the Red Sox were defeated in the firsrst round of the four–team playoff by the eventual champion Paris Lakers 2 games to 0. Lafayette had total season attendance of 42,821.

In their final season of play, the 1957 Lafayette Red Sox did not qualify for the Midwest League playoffs. Lafayette ended the season with a 55–67 record, under manager Ken Deal, placing sixth in the final standings and finishing 19.0 games behind the first place Kokomo Dodgers. The franchise drew 32,667 at home for the season.

After the 1957 season, the Lafayette franchise moved to Waterloo, Iowa and became the Waterloo Hawks, playing in the 1958 Midwest League. The franchise is still in existence, having evolved into today's Lansing Lugnuts.

=== 1994: Great Central League ===
Lafayette, Indiana was without minor league baseball until the 1994 Lafayette Leopards played as members of the Independent level Great Central League which folded during the 1994 season. Lafayette was in first place with a 44–24 record when the league folded.

== The ballpark ==
Starting in 1955, Lafayette hosted minor league home games at Loeb Stadium. The ballpark was known as "Colombian Park" until 1971. Built in 1937, the ballpark had a capacity of 5,000 in 1955 and 3,200 in 1997, with dimensions (Left, Center, Right) of 322–415–333. The stadium was demolished in 2019, with a new ballpark opening on the site in 2021.

From 1943 to 1945, Colombian Park was the Spring Training site of the Cleveland Indians. In this era, teams held spring training at cities in their region because of restrictions in place due to World War II.

== Timeline ==
Year(s)	# Yrs.	Team	Level	League	Affiliate
1909	1	Lafayette Maroons	Class D	Northern State of Indiana League	None
1910–1911	2	Lafayette Farmers	Class D	Northern State of Indiana League	None
1955	1	Lafayette Chiefs	Class D	Mississippi-Ohio Valley League	Cleveland Indians
1956–1957	2	Lafayette Red Sox	Class D	Midwest League	Boston Red Sox
1994	1	Lafayette Leopards	Independent	Great Central League	None

== Year–by–year records ==
Year	Record	Finish	Manager	Playoffs/Notes
1909	66–39	1st (tied)	Pete Driver	League Co-Champions
1910	39–30	3rd	Fred Payne / Carl Cominger	No playoffs held
1911	28–37	5th	Carl Cominger	League folded July 29
1955	63–63	5th	Mark Wylie	Did not qualify
1956	69–56	2nd	Len Okrie	Lost in 1st round
1957	55–67	6th	Ken Deal	Did not qualify
1994	44–24	1st	Jim Gonzales	League champions League folded

== Notable alumni ==
- Ken Deal (1957, MGR)
- Russ Gibson (1957)
- Carl Mathias (1955)
- Len Okrie (1957, MGR)
- Fred Payne (1910, MGR)
- Jay Ritchie (1956)
- Tracy Stallard (1956–1957) Surrendered Roger Maris' #61 Home Run, 1961

== See also ==
- Lafayette Red Sox players
