= Logansport, Indiana minor league baseball history =

Logansport, Indiana minor league baseball
- 1888–1911; (1888, 1890, 1896, 1900, 1910–1911); Logansport, Indiana

Minor league affiliations
- Class: Independent (1888, 1890, 1896, 1900); Class D (1910–1911)
- League: Indiana State League (1888, 1890, 1896, 1900); Northern State of Indiana League (1910–1911)

Major league affiliations
- Team: None

Minor league titles
- League titles (2): 1888; 1896

Team data
- Name: Logansport Oilers (1888); Logansport (1890); Logansport Ottos (1896); Logansport (1900); Logansport Whitecaps (1910–1911)
- Ballpark: Unknown

Minor league baseball teams were based in Logansport, Indiana in various seasons between 1888 and 1911. Logansport teams played as members of the Indiana State League in 1888, 1890, 1896, 1900 and the Northern State of Indiana League in 1910 and 1911.

== History ==
The 1888 Logansport Oilers first began minor league play as members of the Indiana State League and won a championship in a shortened season. Logansport began play on May 11, 1888, as members of the Independent six–team league with fellow members representing from Indiana cities of Elkhart, Fort Wayne, Frankfort, Lafayette, and Marion. After the season began, the Lafayette, Indiana franchise withdrew on June 12, 1888, to join the Central Interstate League and were replaced by the South Bend Green Stockings. The 1888 Indiana State League folded mid–season, on June 18, 1888. The Logansport Oilers were in first place with a 10–3 record when the Indiana State League stopped play in 1888.

The Indiana State League expanded and played as an eight–team league in 1890, with Logansport joining the league mid–season. The 1890 member teams to begin the season were the Anderson, Bluffton, Elkhart, Fort Wayne Reds, Kokomo, Marion, Muncie and Peru teams. During the season, on July 6, 1890, Marion (27–24) transferred to Logansport. The team finished 29–29 overall to place fifth, playing the season under manager Bob Berryhill.

The Logansport Ottos played a brief season as members of the 1896 six–team Independent level Indiana State League. The Ottos were the 1896 league champions with a 4–2 record under manager M.A Ryan. The league began play on July 26 and the season ended on August 4, 1896. The team was named after club owner Otto Kraus.

In the final season of play, the Indiana State League reformed as a six–team league for the 1900 season. Logansport moved to become the Elwood Wanderers during the season and the team then disbanded June 10. The team had a 7–17 record and were in sixth place under manager John Ray when the franchise folded. When the Logansport/Elwood and Muncie teams both disbanded on June 10, 1900, it caused the entire league to fold. The Wabash Farmers were in first place with a 19–9 record when the league disbanded.

In 1910, the Logansport Whitecaps became members of the Class D level Northern State of Indiana League. The league began the season with four teams. On July 2, 1910, the Bluffton and Marion franchises joined league play and games played prior to July 1, 1910, were not counted in the standings. The Wabash Rockeries won the league championship with a 46–25 record, finishing 3.5 games ahead of the second place Bluffton Babes, while the Whitecaps placed 6th in the standings with a record of 24–45 under managers Nathanial Fleming, Thomas and Fred Payne.

The 1911 season was the final season of play for the Northern State of Indiana League and Logansport. During the final season, the Logansport Whitecaps franchise moved to Anderson, Indiana on July 2, 1911, and Bluffton folded on the same date. The league permanently folded on July 29, 1911. At the time the league folded, the Marion Boosters, with a record of 46–24, finished 6.0 games ahead of the second place Huntington Indians in the six–team league. The Bluffton Babes (31–31), Wabash Rockeries (30–35), Lafayette Farmers (28–37) and Logansport /Anderson Whitecaps (22–40) were the remaining franchises in the last season of play. The Whitecaps were managed by John Reagan in their final season.

The Northern State of Indiana League permanently folded following the 1911 season. Logansport has not hosted another minor league team.

== The ballpark ==
The name of the Logansport home minor league ballpark is not directly referenced. In the era, Spencer Park was in use as a public park, beginning in 1892.

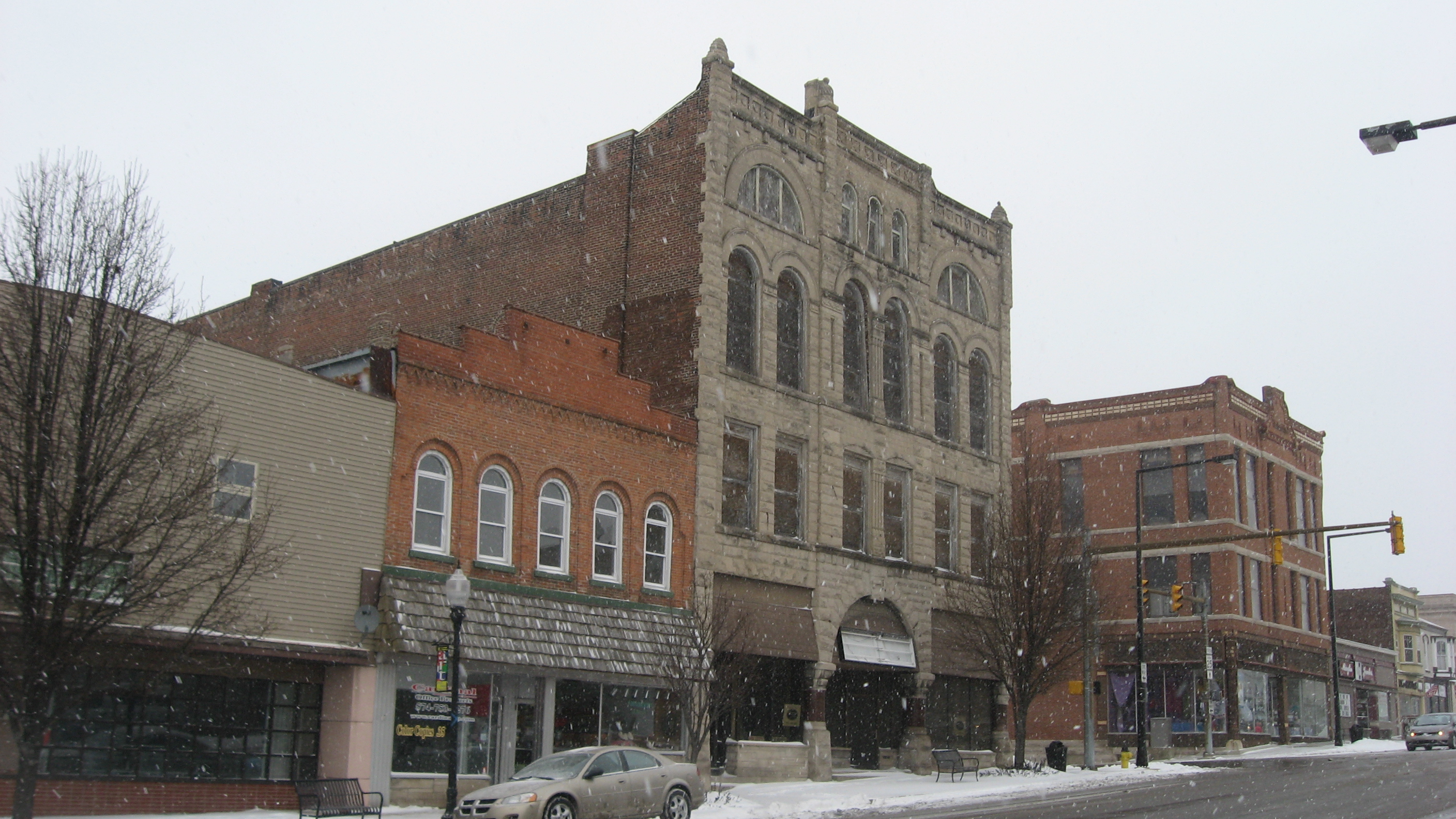
(2012) Four National Register of Historic Places buildings on Broadway. Logansport, Indiana

== Timeline ==
Year(s)	# Yrs.	Team	Level	League
1888	1	Logansport Oilers	Independent	Indiana State League
1890	1	Logansport	Independent	Indiana State League
1896	1	Logansport Ottos	Independent	Indiana State League
1900	1	Logansport	Independent	Indiana State League
1910–1911	2	Logansport Whitecaps	Class D	Northern State of Indiana League

== Year–by–year records ==
Year	Record	Finish	Manager	Playoffs/Notes
1888	10–3	1st	NA	League disbanded June 18, 1888; League champions
1890	29–29	5th	Bob Berryhill	Marion moved to Logansport July 6
1896	4–2	1st	M.A Ryan	League champions
1900	7–17	6th	John Ray	Moved to Elwood; Team disbanded June 10
1910	24–45	6th	Nathanial Fleming / Thomas; Fred Payne	No playoffs held
1911	22–40	6th	John Reagan	Team moved to Anderson July 2

== Notable alumni ==
- Monte Beville (1896)
- Bill Byers (1896)
- Logansport Ottos players
