= Northern State of Indiana League =

- Classification: Class D (1909–1911)
- Sport: Minor League Baseball
- First season: 1909
- Folded: July 29, 1911
- President: Charles Klunk (1909); Daniel Flanagan (1910); Charles Halderman (1910); Charles Klunk (1911)
- No. of teams: 8
- Country: United States of America
- Most titles: 1 Bluffton Babes/Lafayette Maroons (1909); Wabash Rockeries (1910); Marion Boosters (1911)

The Northern State of Indiana League was a Class D level minor league baseball league that played from 1909 to 1911. The six–team Northern State of Indiana League consisted of teams based in Indiana.

== History ==
The Northern State of Indiana League began minor league play on May 5, 1909, as a Class D level six–team league, under the direction of league president Charles Klunk. The Bluffton Babes, Huntington Johnnies, Kokomo Wild Cats, Lafayette Maroons and Marion Boosters joined the Wabash Whitecaps as charter members of the league.

At the conclusion of the 1909 Northern State of Indiana League season, there was a tie for first place. The Bluffton Babes with a 65–38 (.631) record and the Lafayette Maroons with a 66–39 record (.629) tied for first place in the standings, with the two teams finishing 6.0 games ahead of the third place Huntington Johnnies. The league held no playoffs for its duration. The regular season 1st place team was the Northern State of Indiana League champion.

In 1910, the Northern State of Indiana League was under the direction of presidents Daniel Flanagan and Charles Halderman and began the season with four teams. On July 2, 1910, the Bluffton and Marion franchises joined league play and games played prior to July 1, 1910, were not counted in the standings. The Wabash Rockeries won the league championship with a 46–25 record, finishing 3.5 games ahead of the second place Bluffton Babes.

The 1911 season was the final season of play for the Northern State of Indiana League. Charles Klunk returned as league president as play began on May 24, 1911. During the final season, the Logansport franchise moved to Anderson on July 2, 1911, and Bluffton folded on the same date. The league permanently folded on July 29, 1911. At the time the league folded, the Marion Boosters, with a record of 46–24, finished 6.0 games ahead of the second place Huntington Indians in the six–team league. The Bluffton Babes (31–31), Wabash Rockeries (30–35), Lafayette Farmers (28–37) and Logansport Whitecaps /Anderson Whitecaps (22–40) were the remaining franchises in the last season of play.

== Northern State of Indiana League teams ==
Team name	City represented	Ballpark	Year(s) active
Anderson Whitecaps	Anderson, Indiana	Unknown	1911
Bluffton Babes	Bluffton, Indiana	Unknown	1909 to 1911
Huntington Johnnies (1909–1910); Huntington Indians (1911)	Huntington, Indiana	Unknown	1909 to 1911
Kokomo Wild Cats	Kokomo, Indiana	Unknown	1909
Lafayette Maroons (1909); Lafayette Farmers (1910–1911)	Lafayette, Indiana	Unknown	1909 to 1911
Logansport Whitecaps	Logansport, Indiana	Unknown	1910 to 1911
Marion Boosters	Marion, Indiana	Unknown	1909 to 1911
Wabash Whitecaps (1909); Wabash Rockeries (1910–1911)	Wabash, Indiana	City Park	1909 to 1911

== League standings ==
1909 Northern State of Indiana League

Team standings	W	L	PCT	GB	Managers
Bluffton Babes	65	38	.631	–	Ducky Eberts / Herman Webber
Lafayette Maroons	66	39	.629	-	Pete Driver
Huntington Johnnies	61	46	.570	6	Larry Strands
Kokomo Wild Cats	50	53	.485	15	Ed Hill
Marion Boosters	38	67	.362	28	Mike Lawrence / Beach Edmiston
Wabash Whitecaps	35	72	.327	32	Charles Klunk

1910 Northern State of Indiana League

Team standings	W	L	PCT	GB	Managers
Wabash Rockeries	46	25	.648	–	Eddie Pferferle
Bluffton Babes	42	28	.600	3½	Daddy Orr / Herman Webber
Lafayette Farmers	39	30	.565	6	Fred Payne / Carl Cominger
Marion Boosters	32	37	.464	13	Mike Lawrence
Huntington Johnnies	23	41	.359	19½	Larry Strands
Logansport Whitecaps	24	45	.348	21	Nathanial Fleming / Thomas /Fred Payne

1911 Northern State of Indiana League

Team standings	W	L	PCT	GB	Managers
Marion Boosters	46	24	.657	–	Mike Lawrence
Huntington Indians	40	30	.571	6	Larry Strands
Bluffton Babes	31	31	.500	11	Jake Schock / Lew Scott
Wabash Rockeries	30	35	.462	13½	Eddie Pferferle
Lafayette Farmers	28	37	.431	15½	Carl Cominger
Logansport / Anderson Whitecaps	22	40	.355	20	NA
