= Nick Reeder =

American baseball player (1867–1894)

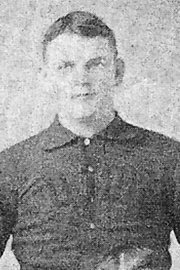
- Third baseman
- Born: March 22, 1867; Louisville, Kentucky, U.S.
- Died: September 26, 1894 (aged 27); Louisville, Kentucky, U.S.
- Batted: Right Threw: Right

MLB debut
- April 11, 1891, for the Louisville Colonels

Last MLB appearance
- April 11, 1891, for the Louisville Colonels

MLB statistics
- Games played: 1
- Batting average: .000
- Runs scored: 0
- Stats at Baseball Reference

Teams
- Louisville Colonels (1891)

Nicholas Reeder (born Nicholas Herchenroeder; March 22, 1867 – September 26, 1894) was an American professional baseball player. He played one game for the Louisville Colonels of the major-league American Association in 1891.

== Biography ==
Reeder was born in 1867 in Louisville, Kentucky. Detail of his early years is lacking. Baseball records, which are incomplete for the era, show that Reeder played professionally during 1890 in the Indiana State League, for the Bluffton and Muncie teams.

Reeder is primarily known for his one appearance in a major-league game. On April 11, 1891, playing for the Louisville Colonels, Reeder pinch hit for Tim Shinnick and then remained in the game as third baseman, going 0-for-2 in the game. That season, he also played for Fort Wayne of the Northwestern League and Marinette of the Wisconsin State League.

In 1892, Reeder played 17 games for Spokane of the Pacific Northwest League. He appears to have played semi-professionally in 1893 for a team based in Louisville, and also worked as an umpire that season. In 1894, Reeder played for Peoria of the Western Association. A report in the Lexington Herald-Leader indicates he was playing for a team based in Georgetown, Kentucky, in early August 1894.

Reeder died in Louisville on September 26, 1894, at age 27, while still an active player. His death was reportedly caused by "brain fever". He was buried in Cave Hill Cemetery in Louisville.
