= Elkhart Blue Sox =

- 1910; (1888, 1890, 1910); Elkhart, Indiana

Minor league affiliations
- Class: Independent (1888, 1890); Class D (1910)
- League: Indiana State League (1888, 1890); Indiana-Michigan League (1910)

Major league affiliations
- Team: None

Minor league titles
- League titles (0): None

Team data
- Name: Elkhart (1888, 1890); Elkhart Blue Sox (1910)
- Ballpark: Unknown

The Elkhart Blue Sox were a minor league baseball team based in Elkhart, Indiana. The Blue Sox played as members of the 1910 Class D level Indiana-Michigan League. The Blue Sox were preceded in minor league play by two "Elkhart" teams that played single seasons as members of the Indiana State League in 1888 and 1890.

== History ==
Elkhart, Indiana first hosted minor league baseball play in 1888, when the "Elkhart" team became members of the six–team Independent level Indiana State League. Elkhart began league play on May 11, 1888, with the Fort Wayne, Frankfort, Lafayette, the Logansport Oilers and Marion teams joining Elkhart as members.

On June 18, 1888, the Indiana State League folded in mid-season with Elkhart in second place, playing under manager Dave Carpenter. The Logansport Oilers were in first place with a 10–3 record, followed by Elkhart with a 10–8 record when the league folded.

Elkhart briefly rejoined the 1890 Indiana State League as the league reformed. Teams from Anderson, Bluffton, Fort Wayne Reds, Kokomo, Marion, Muncie and Peru joined Elkhart in beginning league play. On July 6, 1890, Elkhart disbanded from the league with a record of 14–28, playing under returning manager Dave Carpenter. Anderson eventually finished first in the league standings with a 38–25 record.

The 1910 Elkhart "Blue Sox" resumed minor league play. The Blue Sox became charter members of the short–lived 1910 Class D level Indiana-Michigan League, which formed as a six–team league. The league played games only on Sunday. The Berrien Springs Grays, Dowagiac, Michigan team, Gary Sand Fleas, Ligonier, Indiana team and Niles Blues joined the Blue Sox as charter members in league play.

The 1910 Elkhart Blue Sox began league play when the league opened on May 8, 1910. On June 19, 1910, the Gary Sand Fleas franchise folded. The Ligonier franchise folded on June 30, 1910. After their folding, the league continued play as a four–team league. The league then folded on August 21, 1910, with the Elkhart Blue Sox in second place in the standings, playing under manager Charles Karnell.

When the Indiana–Michigan League permanently folded on August 21, 1910, the Berrien Springs Grays finished 4.5 games ahead of second place Elkhart in the standings. The Indiana–Michigan League final overall standings were led by the Berrien Springs Grays (15–4), followed by the Elkhart Blue Sox (10–8), Niles Blues (8–10) and Dowagiac (7–10). The Gary Sand Fleas had a record of 2–5 when the team folded and Ligonier had a 2–6 final record. The Indiana–Michigan League never reformed.

Elkhart, Indiana has not hosted another minor league team. In 2014, a new ballpark was scheduled to be constructed in Elkhart, Indiana to host the Elkhart County Miracle team, who were a planned franchise of the Northern League of Professional Baseball. However, the league never materialized.

== The ballpark ==
The name and location of the Elkhart home minor league ballpark in the era are unknown. Numerous Elkhart ballparks are noted to have been in existence in the era.

== Timeline ==
Year(s)	# Yrs.	Team	Level	League
1888, 1890	2	Elkhart	Independent	Indiana State League
1910	1	Elkhart Blue Sox	Class D	Indiana-Michigan League

== Year–by–year records ==
Year	Record	Finish	Manager	Playoffs/notes
1888	10–8	2nd	Dave Carpenter	League folded June 18
1890	14–28	NA	Dave Carpenter	Team folded June 26
1910	10–8	2nd	Charles Karnell	League folded August 21

== Notable alumni ==
- Charlie Bohn (1890)
- Phil Coridan (1888)
- John Dolan (1888)
- Mac MacArthur (1888)

== See also ==
- Elkhart (minor league baseball) players

The player rosters and statistics for the 1910 Indiana-Michigan League teams, Elkhart included, is unknown.
