= Indiana State League =

Minor League Baseball league

- Classification: Independent (1888, 1890, 1896, 1900)
- Sport: Minor League Baseball
- First season: 1888
- Folded: June 10, 1900
- President: McCullough (1890); Edward E. Hill (1900)
- No. of teams: 13
- Country: United States of America
- Most titles: 1 Logansport Oilers (1888); Anderson (1890); Logansport Ottos (1896); Wabash Farmers (1900)

The Indiana State League was an Independent level minor league baseball league that played in the 1888, 1890, 1896 and 1900 seasons. The Indiana State League consisted of teams based exclusively in Indiana. The Indiana State League permanently folded after the 1900 season.

== History ==
The Indiana State League first began minor league play in 1888. The league began play on May 11, 1888, as an Independent six–team league with members Elkhart, Fort Wayne, Frankfort, Lafayette, Logansport Oilers and Marion. After the season began, the Lafayette, Indiana franchise withdrew on June 12, 1888, to join the Central Interstate League and were replaced by the South Bend Green Stockings. The 1888 Indiana State League folded mid–season, on June 18, 1888. The Logansport Oilers were in first place with a 10–3 record when the Indiana State League stopped play in 1888.

The Indiana State League expanded and played as an eight–team league in 1890 under league president McCullough. The 1890 member teams were Anderson, Bluffton, Elkhart, Fort Wayne Reds, Kokomo, Marion/Logansport, Muncie and Peru. During the season, Marion relocated to Logansport on July 6, 1890. Elkhart disbanded June 26, 1890 and Bluffton disbanded June 30, 1890. Anderson finished first in the league standings with a 38–25 record.

The 1896 Indiana State League briefly formed as a six–team Independent level league. The Logansport Ottos were the 1896 league champions with a 4–2 record under manager M.A Ryan. The league began play on July 26, 1896, and the season ended on August 4, 1896.

In the final season of play, the Indiana State League reformed as a six–team league for the 1900 season. The president was Edward E. Hill. During the season, Elmwood moved from Logansport. Elwood and Muncie both disbanded on June 10, 1900, causing the entire league to fold. The Wabash Farmers were in first place with a 19–9 record when the league disbanded. Anderson and Marion joined Interstate League in August 1900.

== Cities represented ==
- Anderson, Indiana: Anderson (1890, 1896); Anderson Tigers (1900)
- Bluffton, Indiana: Bluffton (1890)
- Elkhart, Indiana: Elkhart (1888, 1890)
- Elwood, Indiana: Elmwood (1896); Elwood Wanderers (1900)
- Fort Wayne, Indiana: Fort Wayne (1888); Fort Wayne Reds (1890)
- Frankfort, Indiana: Frankfort (1888)
- Kokomo, Indiana: Kokomo (1890); Kokomo Blues (1896); Kokomo Wildcats (1900)
- Lafayette, Indiana: Lafayette (1888)
- Logansport, Indiana: Logansport Oilers (1888); Logansport Ottos (1896); Logansport (1900)
- Marion, Indiana: Marion (1888); Marion Veterans (1900)
- Muncie, Indiana: Muncie (1890, 1900)
- Peru, Indiana: Peru (1890)
- South Bend, Indiana: South Bend Green Stockings (1888)
- Wabash, Indiana: Wabash Farmers (1900)

== Standings & statistics ==
1888 Indiana State League

Team standings	W	L	PCT	GB	Managers
Logansport Oilers	10	3	.769	-	A.B. Royce
Elkhart	10	8	.566	3	Dave Carpenter
Lafayette	8	8	.475	4	Charles Tacleton
Marion	5	6	.455	4½	Jake Aydelott
Frankfort	4	9	.308	5	S. Bennett
Fort Wayne	3	7	.300	7	Billy Myers
South Bend Green Stockings	1	0	1.000	NA	Bootsey Johnson

1890 Indiana State League

Team standings	W	L	PCT	GB	Managers
Anderson	38	25	.603	-	Charles Faatz
Muncie	33	29	.532	5½	Benjamin Drischell
Fort Wayne	33	30	.524	6	Billy Meyers / Milton Scott
Kokomo	29	29	.500	6½	Smith
Marion/Logansport	29	29	.500	6½	Bob Berryhill
Peru	25	35	.417	11½	Charles Farrell / Leo Johnson / Lombard
Bluffton	25	21	.543	NA	Jake Aydelott
Elkhart	14	28	.338	NA	NA

1896 Indiana State League

Team standings	W	L	PCT	GB	Managers
Logansport Ottos	4	2	.667	-	M.A. Ryan
Elwood	4	2	.667	-	Huffman
Kokomo Blues	4	4	.500	1	NA
Connersville	2	2	.500	1½	O. M. Hempleman
Rushville	2	6	.333	3	NA
Anderson	1	1	.3500	NA	Nickolas Ivory

1900 Indiana State League

Team standings	W	L	PCT	GB	Managers
Wabash Farmers	19	9	.679	-	Newberger
Anderson Tigers	18	9	.667	½	Harry Quinn
Marion Veterans	17	12	.586	2½	C. Brozier
Muncie	11	17	.393	8	F.L. Wachtell
Kokomo Wildcats	8	16	.333	9	Edward Hill
Logansport/Elwood Wildcats	7	17	.346	10	John Ray
