= Bluffton Babes =

- 1909–1911; (1890, 1907, 1909–1911); Bluffton, Indiana

Minor league affiliations
- Class: Independent (1890); Class D (1907, 1909–1911)
- League: Indiana State League (1890); Ohio-Indiana League (1907); Northern State of Indiana League (1909–1911)

Major league affiliations
- Team: None

Minor league titles
- League titles (1): 1909
- Conference titles (0): None

Team data
- Name: Bluffton (1890); Bluffton Dregs (1907); Bluffton Babes (1909–1911)
- Ballpark: Unknown (1890, 1907, 1909–1911)

The Bluffton Babes were a minor league baseball team based in Bluffton, Indiana. From 1909 to 1911, the Babes played as members of the Class D level Northern State of Indiana League, having been preceded by Bluffton teams of the 1890 Indiana State League and 1907 Ohio-Indiana League. The Babes won the league championship in 1909.

== History ==
Bluffton, Indiana first hosted minor league baseball in 1890. The Bluffton team briefly became members of the Independent level Indiana State League. On June 30, 1890, Bluffton had a 25–21 record when the team folded from the eight–team league. The Bluffton manager in 1890 was Jake Aydelott.

In 1907, the Bluffton resumed minor league play as the Bluffton Dregs became members of the Class D level Ohio-Indiana League, a six–team league. A September 10, 1907, game saw Bluffton defeat Richmond at home by the score of 7–5 in front of a crowd of 150. With a 21–25 record, the Dregs ended the season in fifth place, managed by Frank Runyan, finishing behind the first place Decatur Admirals in the final standings. The Ohio-Indiana League did not return to play in 1908.

The 1909 Bluffton "Babes" became charter members of the six–team Class D level Northern State of Indiana League and won a championship. The Bluffton Babes were co–champions or champions, playing under managers Herman Weber and Henry Eberts. The Huntington Johnnies, Kokomo Wild Cats, Lafayette Maroons, Marion Boosters and Wabash Whitecaps joined Bluffington in beginning league play on May 5, 1909.

At the conclusion of the 1909 season, there was a tie for first place, with Bluffton having the higher winning percentage. The Bluffton Babes with a 65–38 record and .631 winning percentage finished with the Lafayette Maroons, who had a 66–39 record and .629 winning percentage. Bluffton and Lafayette finished 6.0 games ahead of the third place Huntington Johnnies. Bluffton could have been declared the champions with the slightly higher winning percentage, but no research indicates anything but a tie. The league held no playoffs and utilized a regular season format throughout its existence. The Bluffton use of the "Babes" moniker corresponds to the franchise being a new team in 1909.

In 1910, the Northern State of Indiana League began the season with four teams and without Bluffton fielding a team. However, on July 2, 1910, the Bluffton Babes and Marion Boosters both joined league play. As a result, the games played prior to July 1, 1910, were not counted in the standings. The Bluffton Babes placed second in the shortened season standings, with a 42–28 record, playing the season under managers Daddy Orr and Herman Webber. The Wabash Rockeries won the league championship with a 46–25 record, finishing 3.5 games ahead of Bluffton.

The 1911 season was the final season of play for the Northern State of Indiana League and Bluffton. The Bluffton Babes began league play on May 24, 1911. On July 28, 1911, the Bluffton franchise folded on the same date that the Anderson franchise folded. This occurred after the Logansport franchise moved to Anderson on July 2, 1911. The league briefly continued play before permanently folding on July 31, 1911. At the time the league folded, the Marion Boosters, with a record of 46–24, finished 6.0 games ahead of the second place Huntington Indians in the six–team league. The Bluffton Babes (31–31), Wabash Rockeries (30–35), Lafayette Farmers (28–37) and Logansport Whitecaps / Anderson Whitecaps (22–40) were the remaining franchises in the last season of play. Bluffton was managed by Jake Schock and Lew Scott.

Bluffton, Indiana has not hosted another minor league team.

== The ballpark ==
The name of the Bluffton home minor league ballpark is not directly referenced.

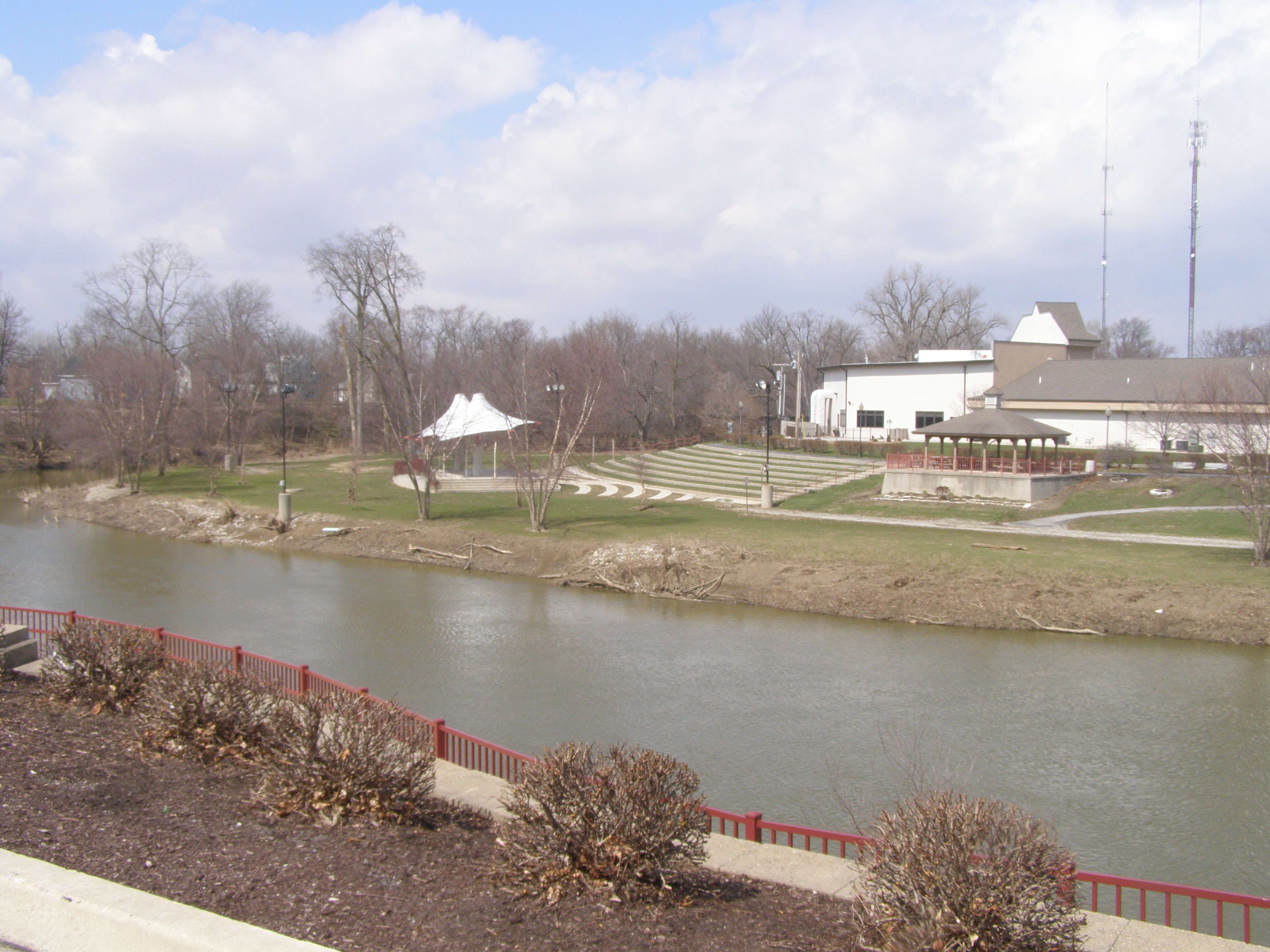
(2011) Bluffton, Indiana. Wabash River

== Timeline ==
Year(s)	# Yrs.	Team	Level	League
1890	1	Bluffton	Independent	Indiana State League
1907	1	Bluffton Dregs	Class D	Ohio-Indiana League
1909–1911	3	Bluffton Babes	Class D	Northern State of Indiana League

== Year–by–year records ==
Year	Record	Finish	Manager	Playoffs
1890	25–31	NA	Jake Aydelott	Team folded June 30
1907	21–25	5th	Frank Runyan	No playoffs held
1909	65–38	1st (tie)	Ducky Eberts / Herman Webber	League Co-Champions
1910	42–28	2nd	Daddy Orr / Herman Webber	No playoffs held
1911	31–31	NA	Jake Schock / Lew Scott	Team folded July 28

== Notable alumni ==
- Jake Aydelott (1890, MGR)
- Jack Heinzman (1890)
- Nick Reeder (1890)
