= Great Central League =

Former baseball league

The Great Central League was a short-lived baseball league of four teams that played baseball in the upper Midwest of the United States in 1994. The league and four teams were owned by Minneapolis-based strip club owner, Dick Jacobson, who previously attempted to purchase the Rochester Aces of the Northern League.

In an effort to bring notoriety to the league, Jacobson signed Boston Red Sox Hall of Fame member George Scott as manager for the Minneapolis Millers. However his presence from the dugout did not help the team or league draw larger crowds to games. The league folded before holding a championship game because it was underfunded, used facilities ill-equipped for professional baseball, and was run by inexperienced management.

== Teams ==
- Champaign-Urbana Bandits
- Lafayette Leopards
- Mason City Bats
- Minneapolis Millers

== Standings ==
Team Standings	W	L	PCT	GB	Attend	Managers
Lafayette Leopards	44	24	.647	0	11,682	Jim Gonzales
Champaign-Urbana Bandits	31	26	.559	7½	NA	Brett Robinson
Minneapolis Millers	30	33	.476	11½	3,000	George Scott
Mason City Bats	19	41	.317	21	NA	Tom Walechi
