= Wabash Rockeries =

- 1899–1911; (1899–1900, 1909–1911); Wabash, Indiana

Minor league affiliations
- Class: Independent (1899–1900); Class D (1909–1911)
- League: Indiana-Illinois League (1899); Indiana State League (1900); Northern State of Indiana League (1909–1911)

Major league affiliations
- Team: None

Minor league titles
- League titles (2): 1900; 1910

Team data
- Name: Wabash (1899); Wabash Farmers (1900); Wabash Rockeries (1909–1911)
- Ballpark: City Park

Playing from 1909 to 1911, the Wabash Rockeries was the final nickname of the minor league baseball teams based in Wabash, Indiana between 1899 and 1911. Wabash teams played as members of the 1899 Indiana-Illinois League, the 1900 Indiana State League and Northern State of Indiana League from 1909 to 1911. Wabash won the 1900 and 1910 league championships. Wabash hosted home minor league games at City Park.

== History ==
The Wabash team first played minor league baseball in 1899. In their first season of play, Wabash played in the six-team Indiana-Illinois League. The Wabash team ended the 1899 season with a record of 37–82, placing fourth as Poor served as the Wabash manager.

Wabash continued play in 1900, becoming members of the Indiana State League. The Wabash "Farmers" won a championship in a shortened season, as the Indiana State League played as a six–team league for the 1900 season. The league struggled during the season, as Elmwood moved from Logansport. On June 10, 1900, the Elwood and Muncie teams both disbanded, causing the entire league to fold. The Wabash Farmers were in first place with a 19–9 record when the league disbanded. Wabash was just 0.5 game ahead of the second place Anderson team. Newberger served as manager.

In 1909, the Wabash "Rockeries" were formed and became charter members of the six–team, Class D level Northern State of Indiana League. The Bluffton Babes, Huntington Johnnies, Kokomo Wild Cats, Lafayette Maroons and Marion Boosters teams joined Wabash in beginning league play on May 5, 1909.

The 1909 Wabash Rockeries are also referred to as the "Whitecaps." The team finished last in the Northern State of Indiana League standings. Under manager Charles Klunk, the Rockeries ended the 1909 season with a record of 35–72, placing sixth in the final standings. There was a standings tie for first place as the Bluffton Babes with a 65–38 record and .631 winning percentage finished with the Lafayette Maroons, who had a 66–39 record and .629 winning percentage, with Wabash 32.0 games behind. The league held no playoffs and utilized a regular season format throughout its existence.

The Wabash Rockeries rebounded from their last place finish and won the 1910 Northern State of Indiana League championship in a season of change. In 1910, the Northern State of Indiana League began the season with four teams. On July 2, 1910, the Bluffton Babes and Marion Boosters both rejoined league play. As a result, the games played prior to July 1, 1910, were not counted in the standings. With the league restarted, the Rockeries ended the 1910 season in first place with a record of 46–25. Playing under manager Eddie Pferferle, Wabash finished 3.5 games ahead of the second place Bluffton Babes in the six–team league.

The Wabash Rockeries continued Northern State of Indiana League play in 1911. The Rockeries ended the season with a record of 30–35, placing third in their final season. The 1911 season was the final season of play for the Northern State of Indiana League and Wabash. Playing under returning manager Eddie Pferferle, the Wabash Rockeries began league play on May 24, 1911. On July 28, 1911, the Bluffton (31–31) and Anderson (22–40) franchises folded. This occurred after the Logansport franchise moved to Anderson on July 2, 1911. The league briefly continued play before permanently folding on July 31, 1911. At the time the league folded, the Marion Boosters, with a record of 46–24, finished 6.0 games ahead of the second place Huntington Indians in the six–team league. The Wabash Rockeries (30–35), Lafayette Farmers (28–37) were the remaining franchises in the last season of play.

The Northern State of Indiana League did not return to play in 1912. Wabash, Indiana has not hosted another minor league team.

== The ballpark ==
Wabash teams hosted minor league home games at City Park. Today, the site is within Wabash City Park, which still contains baseball facilities. The park was founded on January 23, 1889. Today, the 35–acre Wabash City Park contains three lighted ballfields and is located at 800 West Hill street.

== Timeline ==
Year(s)	# Yrs.	Team	Level	League	Ballpark
1899	1	Wabash	Independent	Indiana–Illinois League	City Park
1900	1	Wabash Farmers	Independent	Indiana State League	City Park
1909–1911	3	Wabash Rockeries	Class D	Northern State of Indiana League	

== Year-by–year records ==
Year	Record	Finish	Manager	Playoffs / notes
1899	37–82	4th	Poor	No playoffs held
1900	19–9	1st	Newberger	League folded June 10; League champions
1909	35–72	6th	Charles Klunk	No playoffs held
1910	46–25	1st	Eddie Pferferle	League champions
1911	30–35	3rd	Eddie Pferferle	League folded July 31

== Notable alumni ==
- Charles Fuller (1900)
- George Mullin (1900)
