= Niles Blues =

- 1910; Niles, Michigan

Minor league affiliations
- Class: Class D (1910)
- League: Indiana-Michigan League (1910)

Major league affiliations
- Team: None

Minor league titles
- League titles (0): None

Team data
- Name: Niles Blues (1910)
- Ballpark: LaPierre Park (1910)

The Niles Blues were a minor league baseball team based in Niles, Michigan. In 1910, the Blues played their only season as charter members of the short–lived Class D level Indiana-Michigan League, hosting home games at LaPierre Park.

== History ==
Niles, Michigan first hosted minor league baseball play in 1910, when the Niles "Blues" became charter members of the short–lived 1910 Class D level Indiana-Michigan League, which formed as a six–team league. The league played games only on Sunday. The Berrien Springs Grays, Dowagiac, Michigan team, Elkhart Blue Sox, Gary Sand Fleas and Ligonier, Indiana team joined the Niles Blues as charter members in league play.

The Niles' use of the "Blues" moniker corresponded to their navy blue uniforms.

The 1910 Niles Blues were owned and managed by Fred "Bunny" Marshall. In 1910, Marshall also funded the building of the Blues' home ballpark, LaPierre Park. Marshall was the owner of the local New Niles Bottling Works. It was noted that Marshall enjoyed gambling, fun and outsmarting anyone who tried to outwit him. Reportedly, players named Claffy and Connory played for the Blues, George Fink was reported to have played outfield and Lyle Hasfelt played third base for the Blues, while Marshall's son "Bunny Jr." served as the team mascot.

Reportedly, Marshall hired Guy Morton to pitch a game for Niles when the team was without a pitcher. Allegedly, Marshall had Morton sit in the stands, while he took bets and then put Morton in to pitch, winning the game.

The 1910 Niles Blues began play on May 8, 1910, and placed third in the Indiana–Michigan League standings in a shortened season. After the Gary franchise folded on June 19, 1910 and Ligonier folded on June 30, 1910, the league continued play as a four–team league. The league then folded on August 21, 1910.

When the Indiana–Michigan League permanently folded on August 21, 1910, the Niles Blues were in third place with a 8–10 record, playing under manager Fred Marhsall. Niles finished 6.5 games behind first place Berrien Springs in the final overall standings. The final Indiana–Michigan League overall standings were led by the Berrien Springs Grays (15–4), followed by the Elkhart Blue Sox (10–8), Niles Blues (8–10) and Dowagiac (7–10). The Gary Sand Fleas had a record of 2–5 when they folded and Ligonier had a 2–6 final record in their brief period of play. The Indiana–Michigan League never reformed.

Niles, Michigan has not hosted another minor league team.

== The ballpark ==
The Niles Grays hosted 1910 minor league home games at LaPierre Park. The ballpark was built in 1910 by Fred Marshall, the owner and manager of the Niles Blues. The ballpark was also known as Springbrook Park and League Park. It was reported to have been located near the railroad tracks on Wayne Street between 7th street and 8th Street, Niles, Michigan.

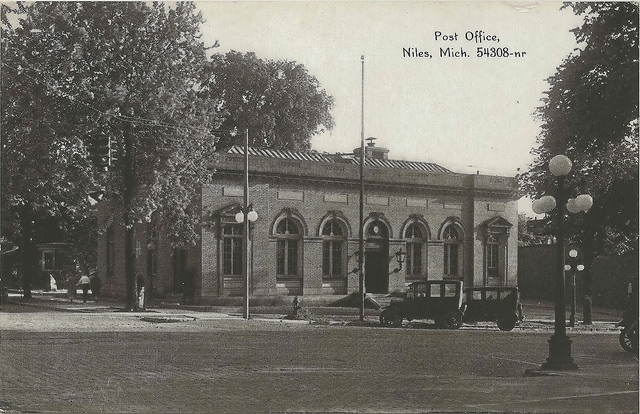
(1909) Post Office. National Register of Historic Places. Niles, Michigan

== Year–by–year record ==
Year	Record	Finish	Manager	Playoffs/Notes
1910	8–10	3rd	Fred Marshall	League folded August 21

== Notable alumni ==
- Guy Morton (1910)

The player rosters and statistics for the 1910 Indiana-Michigan League teams, Niles included, is unknown.
