= List of Boston Red Sox captains =

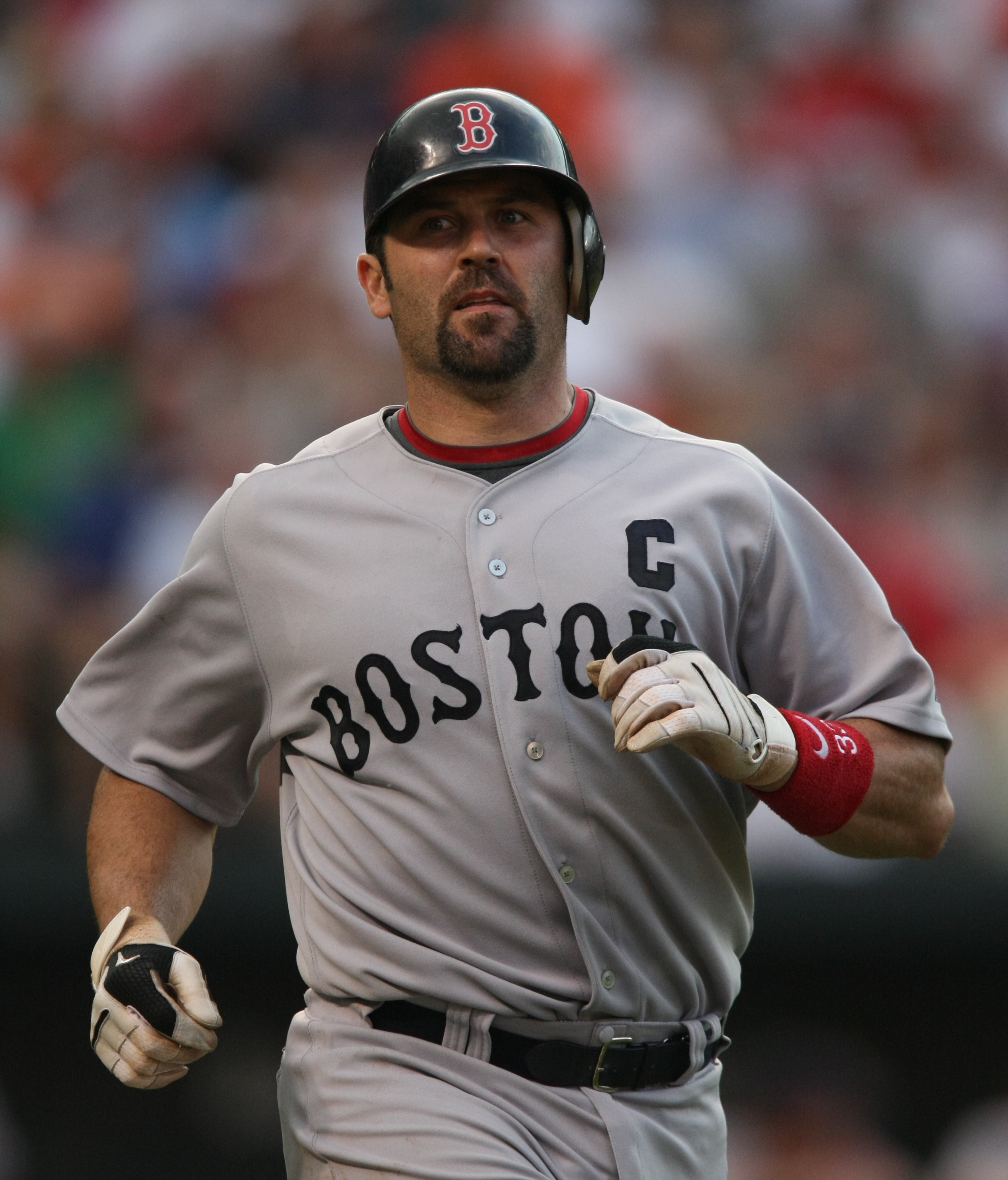
Jason Varitek in 2009 with the captain insignia on his chest

The Boston Red Sox, a professional baseball franchise in Major League Baseball (MLB), has given the title of captain to select players since the team's inaugural season as a member of the American League in 1901 (the team was known as the Boston Americans through the 1907 season). For various seasons during the team's history, the position has been vacant; while in early baseball a captain was responsible for many of the functions now assumed by managers and coaches, the title is purely honorary in modern professional baseball. Since the end of World War II, only three players have served as captain of the Red Sox. The most recent was catcher Jason Varitek, who was captain during the 2005–2011 seasons, and wore a distinctive "C" on the left side of his jersey, similar to captains in the National Hockey League.

== Captains ==
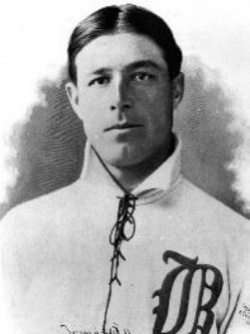
Jimmy Collins was the franchise's first captain, when the team was known as the Boston Americans.

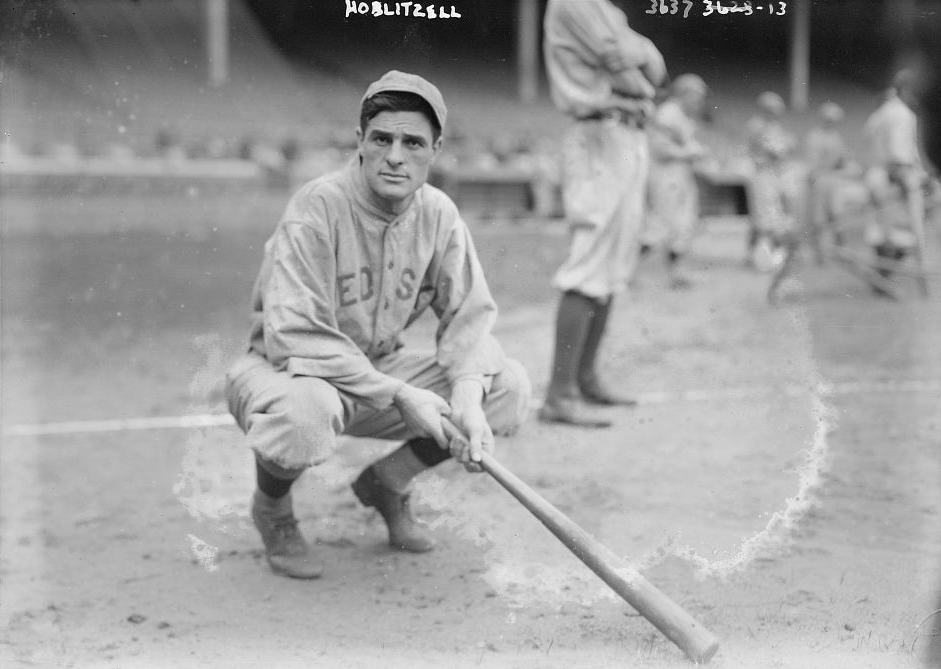
Dick Hoblitzell was captain in 1918.

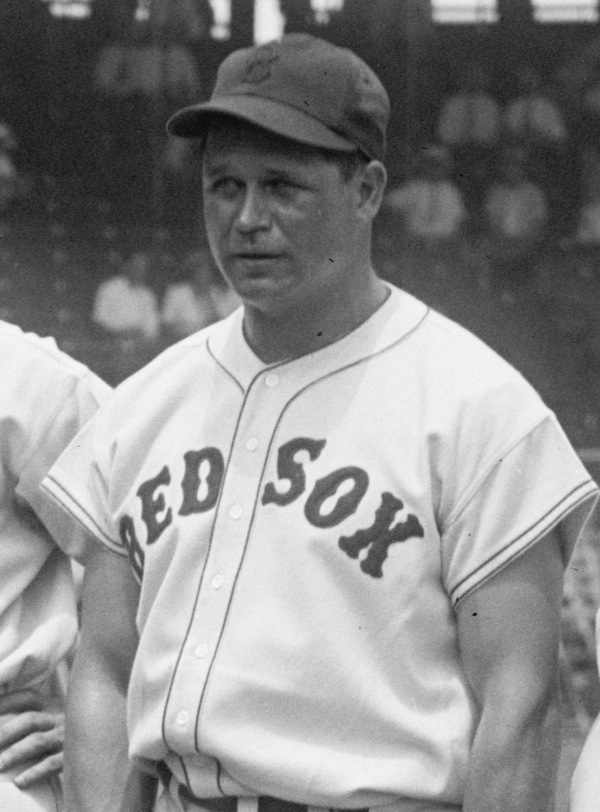
Jimmie Foxx was captain for three seasons during World War II.

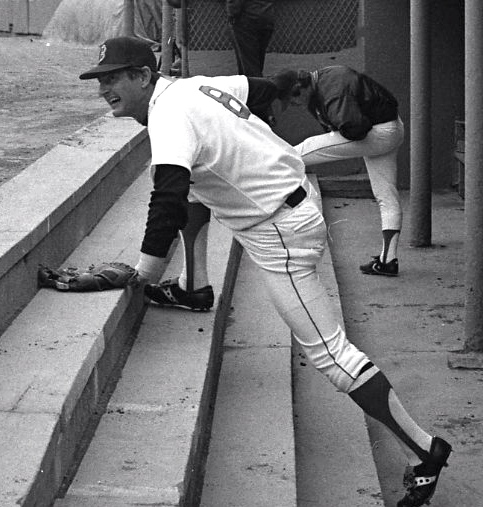
Carl Yastrzemski served the longest tenure as Red Sox captain, 1966 and 1969–1983.

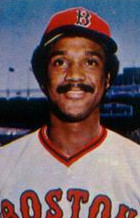
Jim Rice was captain during 1985–1989.

The history of Red Sox captains was researched by baseball historian Howard W. Rosenberg in 2004. The Red Sox front office contacted Rosenberg in advance of Jason Varitek being named captain, after learning that Rosenberg, author of a 2003 book featuring captains in 19th-century baseball, had disputed the official count of captains in New York Yankees franchise history.

| ‡ | Elected to the National Baseball Hall of Fame |

| Player | Position | Years active | Years as captain | Ref. |
|---|---|---|---|---|
Boston Americans (through 1907)
| Jimmy Collins ‡ | 3B | 1895–1908 | 1901–1905 | |
| Chick Stahl | OF | 1897–1906 | 1906 | |
| Bob Unglaub | 1B | 1904–1910 | 1907 | |
Boston Red Sox (1908 to present)
| Deacon McGuire | C | 1884–1912 | 1908 | |
| Doc Gessler | RF | 1903–1911 | 1909 | |
| Harry Lord | 3B | 1903–1911 | 1910 | |
| Heinie Wagner | SS | 1902–1918 | 1911 | |
| Jake Stahl | 1B | 1903–1912 | 1912 | |
| Heinie Wagner | SS | 1902–1918 | 1913–1914 | |
| Jack Barry | 2B | 1908–1919 | 1915–1917 | |
| Dick Hoblitzell | 1B | 1908–1918 | 1918 | |
| Harry Hooper ‡ | OF | 1908–1925 | 1919–1920 | |
| Everett Scott | SS | 1914–1926 | 1921 | |
| Del Pratt | 2B | 1914–1926 | 1922 | |
| George Burns | 1B | 1914–1929 | 1923 | |
| Mike Menosky | LF | 1914–1923 | 1923^{[a]} | |
No captain 1924–1939
| Jimmie Foxx ‡ | 1B | 1925–1945 | 1940–1942 | |
No captain 1943–1965
| Carl Yastrzemski ‡ | OF | 1961–1983 | 1966 | |
No captain 1967–1968
| Carl Yastrzemski ‡ | OF | 1961–1983 | 1969–1983 | |
No captain 1984
| Jim Rice ‡ | OF | 1974–1989 | 1985–1989 | |
No captain 1990–2004
| Jason Varitek | C | 1997–2011 | 2005–2011 | |
No captain 2012–present

== Notes ==
- ^{a} Served as acting captain for one game.
