= Gary Sand Fleas =

- 1910; Gary, Indiana

Minor league affiliations
- Class: Class D (1910)
- League: Indiana-Michigan League (1910)

Major league affiliations
- Team: None

Minor league titles
- League titles (0): None

Team data
- Name: Gary Sand Fleas (1910)
- Ballpark: Knerfs Park (1910)

The Gary Sand Fleas were a minor league baseball team based in Gary, Indiana. In 1910, the Gary Sand Fleas were charter members of the Class D level Indiana-Michigan League and folded during the league's only season of play. Gary hosted home minor league games at Knerfs Park.

== History ==
Gary, Indiana first hosted minor league baseball play in 1910, when the Gary Sand Fleas became charter members of the short–lived 1910 Class D level Indiana-Michigan League, which formed as a six–team league. The league played games only on Sunday. The Berrien Springs Grays, Dowagiac, Michigan team, Elkhart Blue Sox, Ligonier, Indiana team and Niles Blues joined the Gary Sand Fleas as charter members in league play.

The Gary use of the "Sand Fleas" moniker corresponds to local natural sand dunes in Gary's location adjacent to Lake Michigan.

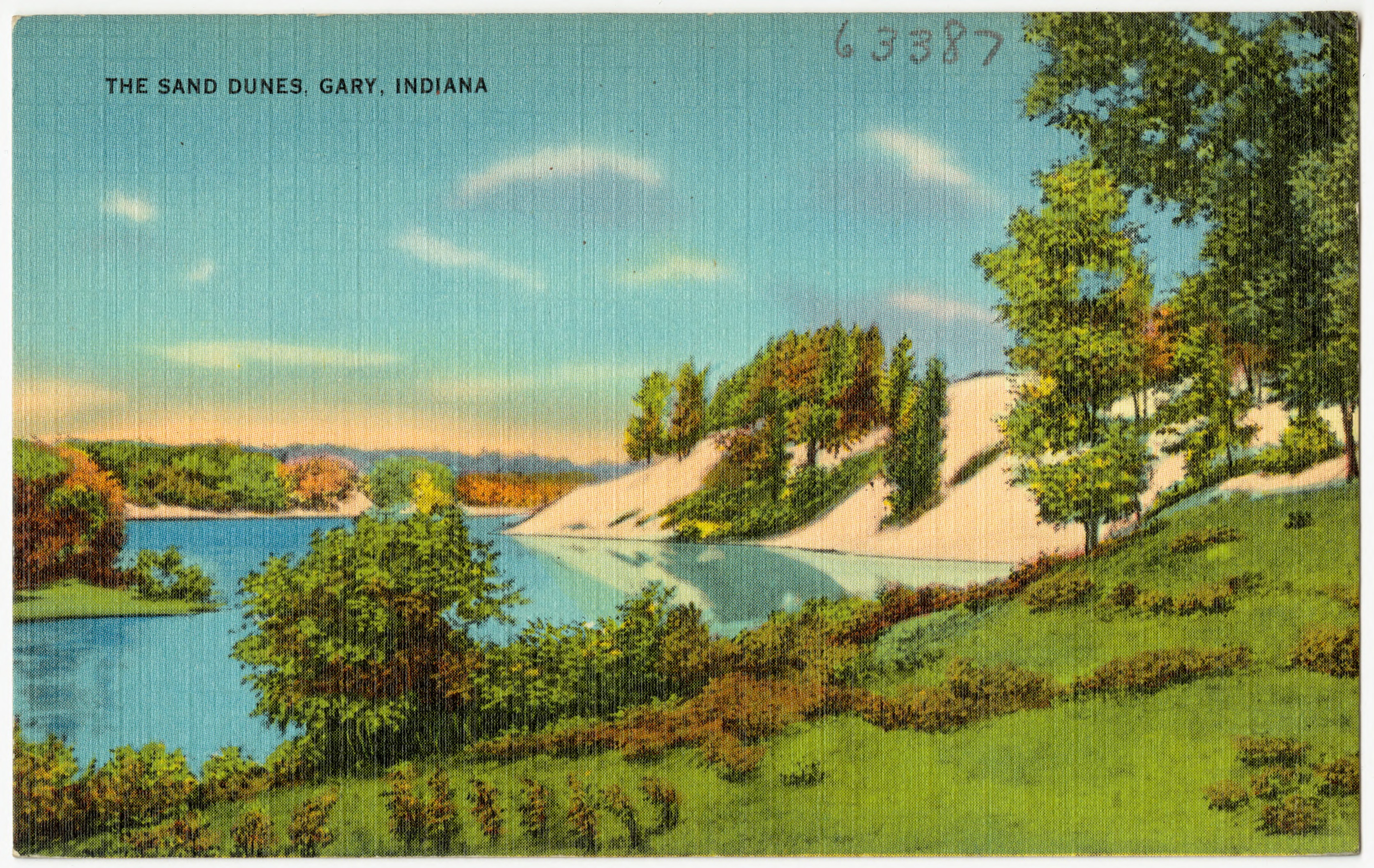
(Postcard) The sand dunes, Gary, Indiana

The 1910 Gary Sand Fleas began league play when the league opened on May 8, 1910. The Gary franchise quickly folded as the Indiana–Michigan League played their only season in a shortened season. On June 19, 1910, the Gary Sand Fleas franchise folded, with a 2–5 record playing under managers C.R. Woods and F.E. Copeland. The Ligonier franchise folded on June 30, 1910. After their folding, the league continued play as a four–team league. The league then folded on August 21, 1910, with Berrien Springs in first place in the standings.

When the Indiana–Michigan League permanently folded on August 21, 1910, Berrien Springs finished 4.5 games ahead of second place Elkhart in the standings. The final Indiana–Michigan League final overall standings were led by Berrien Springs (15–4), followed by the Elkhart Blue Sox (10–8), Niles Blues (8–10) and Dowagiac (7–10). The Gary Sand Fleas had a record of 2–5 when the team folded. Ligonier had a 2–6 final record in their brief period of play. The Indiana–Michigan League never reformed.

It was reported in newspaper accounts that the Gary Sand Fleas continued play on a semi–pro level following their folding from the Indiana–Michigan League. The team was noted to have scheduled and played series in June 1910 against teams from Hammond and the Whiting Grays. An away series in September 1910 at Whiting was cancelled due to "weather and rain."

Gary, Indiana was without minor league baseball until the 2002 Gary SouthShore RailCats began play as members of the Northern League.

== The ballpark ==
The Gary home ballpark for 1910 home games was referred to in newspaper accounts as Knerfs Park. The ballpark was noted to be located in the Tolleston area of Gary, Indiana.

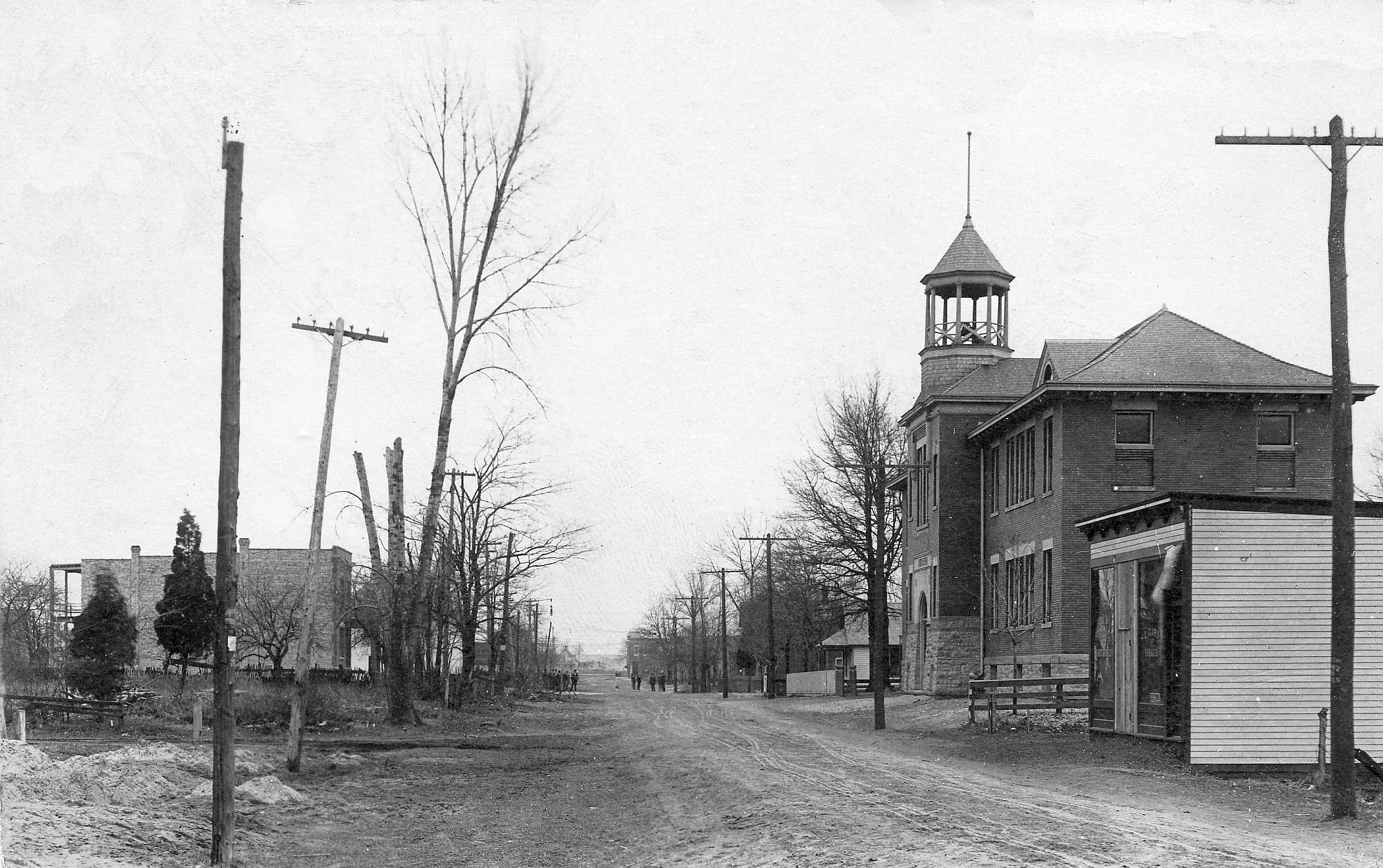
(1909) Tolleston, Indiana

== Year–by–year record ==
Year	Record	Finish	Manager	Playoffs/notes
1910	2–5	NA	C.R. Woods / F.E. Copeland	Team folded June 19; League folded August 21

== Notable alumni ==
The player rosters and statistics for the 1910 Indiana–Michigan League teams, Gary included, is unknown.
