= Indiana–Michigan League =

Class D level minor league baseball league

- Classification: Class D (1910)
- Sport: Minor League Baseball
- First season: 1910
- Folded: August 21, 1910
- President: Robert Proctor (1910)
- No. of teams: 6
- Country: United States of America
- Most titles: 1 Berrien Springs Grays (1910)

The Indiana–Michigan League was a Class D level minor league baseball league that played in the 1910 season. As the name indicates, the league franchises were based in Indiana and Michigan.

== History ==
The Indiana–Michigan League played only the 1910 season, folding on August 21, 1910. The league only played games on Sundays. The Gary team disbanded on June 19, the Ligonier team on June 30. The league permanently folded on August 21, 1910, with the Berrien Springs Grays winning the 1910 championship.

== Cities represented ==
- Berrien Springs, MI: Berrien Springs Grays 1910
- Dowagiac, MI: Dowagiac 1910
- Elkhart, IN: Elkhart Blue Sox 1910
- Gary, IN: Gary Sand Fleas 1910
- Ligonier, IN: Ligonier 1910
- Niles, MI: Niles Blues 1910

== Standings and statistics ==
=== 1910 Indiana–Michigan League ===
Team standings	W	L	PCT	GB	Managers
Berrien Springs Grays	15	4	.789	--	Fatty McComber
Elkhart Blue Sox	10	8	.556	4.5	Charles Karnell
Niles Blues	8	10	.444	6.5	Fred Marshall
Dowagiac	7	11	.389	7.5	John Shottz
Gary Sand Fleas	2	5	.286	NA	Walt Woods / F.E. Copeland
Ligonier	2	6	.250	NA	Bert Inks

Gary disbanded June 19.
Ligonier disbanded June 30.
The league, which played Sunday games only, disbanded August 21.

== Sources ==
The Encyclopedia of Minor league Baseball: Second Edition.
