= Berrien Springs Grays =

- 1910; Berrien Springs, Michigan

Minor league affiliations
- Class: Class D (1910)
- League: Indiana-Michigan League (1910)

Major league affiliations
- Team: None

Minor league titles
- League titles (1): 1910

Team data
- Name: Berrien Springs Grays (1910)
- Ballpark: Grove City Park (1910)

The Berrien Springs Grays were a minor league baseball team based in Berrien Springs, Michigan. In 1910, the Grays were charter members of the Class D level Indiana-Michigan League, winning the league championship in the league's only season of play. Berrien Springs hosted home minor league games at Grove City Park,

== History ==
Berrien Springs, Michigan first hosted minor league baseball play in 1910, when the Berrien Springs "Grays" became charter members of the short–lived 1910 Class D level Indiana-Michigan League. Formed as a six–team league, the Indiana-Michigan League played games only on Sunday. The Dowagiac, Michigan team, Elkhart Blue Sox, Gary Sand Fleas, Ligonier, Indiana team and Niles Blues joined the Grays as charter members in league play.

The 1910 Berrien Springs Grays began league play on May 8, 1910, and won the Indiana–Michigan League championship in a shortened season. After the Gary franchise folded on June 19, 1910, and Ligonier folded on June 30, 1910, the league continued play as a four-team league. The league then folded on August 21, 1910, with Berrien Springs in first place in the standings.

When the Indiana–Michigan League permanently folded on August 21, 1910, the Berrien Springs Grays were in first place with a 15–4 record, playing under manager G.O "Fatty" McComber. Berrien Springs finished 4.5 games ahead of second place Elkhart in the final overall standings. The final Indiana–Michigan League overall standings were led by the Berrien Springs (15–4), followed by the Elkhart Blue Sox (10–8), Niles Blues (8–10) and Dowagiac (7–10). The Gary Sand Fleas had a record of 2–5 when they folded, and Ligonier had a 2–6 final record in their brief period of play. The Indiana–Michigan League never reformed.

Berrien Springs, Michigan has not hosted another minor league team.

== The ballpark ==
The Berrien Springs Grays were noted to have played 1910 minor league home games at the ballpark within Grove City Park. The ballpark was constructed in 1909. Also known as "Wolf's Prairie", the park was formed in 1881. Grove Park is still in use today as a public park. The park is located at the end of Main Street, Berrien Springs, Michigan.

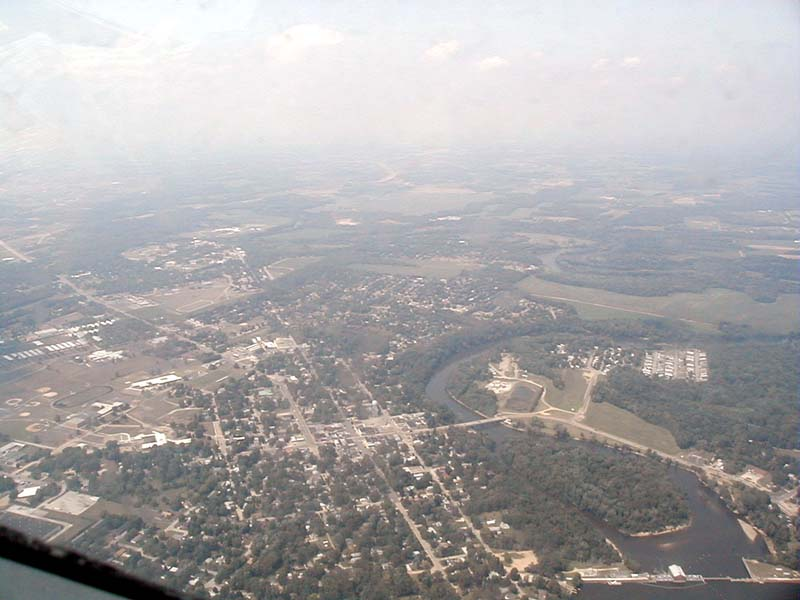
(2006) Berrien Springs, Michigan

== Year–by–year record ==
Year	Record	Finish	Manager	Playoffs/Notes
1933	15–4	1st	G.O "Fatty" McComber	League champions League folded August 21

== Notable alumni ==
Player rosters and statistics for the 1910 Indiana-Michigan League teams, Berrien Springs included, are unknown.
