= Jason Varitek =

American baseball player (born 1972)

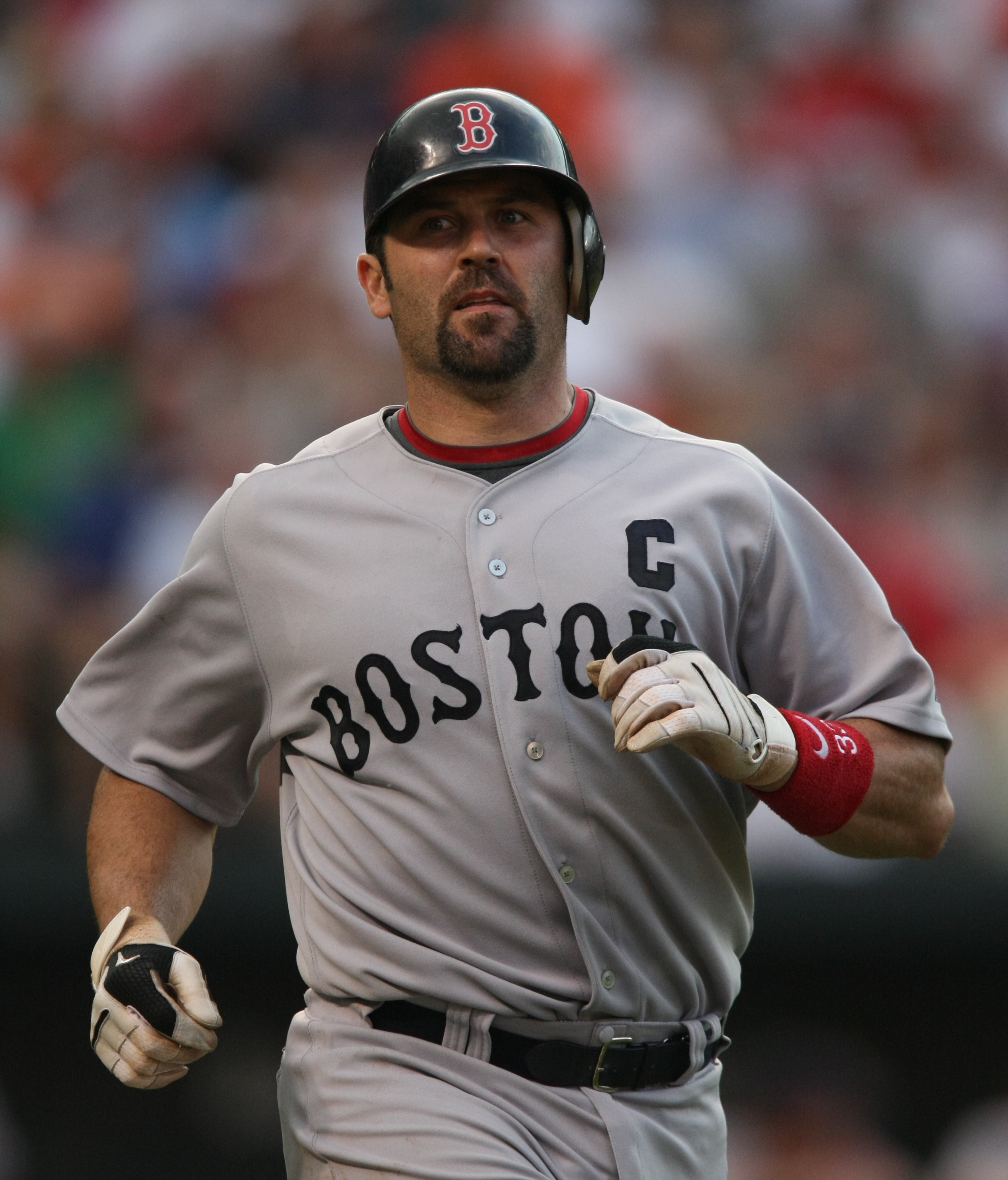
- Varitek in 2009
- Catcher
- Born: April 11, 1972 (age 54); Rochester, Michigan, U.S.
- Batted: Switch Threw: Right

MLB debut
- September 24, 1997, for the Boston Red Sox

Last MLB appearance
- September 25, 2011, for the Boston Red Sox

MLB statistics
- Batting average: .256
- Home runs: 193
- Runs batted in: 757
- Stats at Baseball Reference

Teams
- As player: Boston Red Sox (1997–2011); As coach: Boston Red Sox (2021–2026)

Career highlights and awards
- 3× All-Star (2003, 2005, 2008); 2× World Series champion (2004, 2007); Gold Glove Award (2005); Silver Slugger Award (2005); Golden Spikes Award (1994); Dick Howser Trophy (1994); Boston Red Sox Hall of Fame

Jason Andrew Varitek (/ˈværɪtɛk/; born April 11, 1972), nicknamed "Tek", is an American professional baseball coach and former catcher. He was most recently the game planning coordinator, a uniformed coaching position, for the Boston Red Sox of Major League Baseball (MLB). After being traded as a minor league prospect by the Seattle Mariners, Varitek played his entire 15-year career for the Red Sox. A three-time All-Star and Gold Glove Award winner at catcher, as well as a Silver Slugger Award winner, Varitek was part of the 2004 World Series and 2007 World Series Championship teams, and widely viewed as one of the team's leaders. In December 2004 he was named the captain of the Red Sox, only their fourth captain since 1923. He was a switch-hitter.

Varitek is one of three players, along with pitcher Ed Vosberg and outfielder Michael Conforto, to play in the Little League World Series, College World Series, and MLB World Series. He also participated in the Summer Olympics and World Baseball Classic. His Lake Brantley High School baseball team won the Florida state championship his senior year in 1990 and was named the number one high school baseball team in the nation by a USA Today poll. Varitek caught four no-hitters, an MLB record later tied by Carlos Ruiz.

== Amateur career ==
Varitek played in the 1984 Little League World Series, leading his Altamonte Springs, Florida, team to victory in the United States Championship bracket in a 4–2 victory over Southport, Indiana.

Varitek was Lake Brantley High School's third baseman and relief catcher. In 1990, the Patriots won the state championship.

Varitek attended Georgia Tech, where he helped lead the Yellow Jackets baseball team to the 1994 College World Series title game, along with future Red Sox teammates Nomar Garciaparra and Jay Payton (they lost to the University of Oklahoma). In 1994, he received the Baseball America College Player of the Year Award, and won the Dick Howser Trophy for national collegiate player of the year. Varitek graduated from Georgia Tech with a degree in management and was the first Tech baseball player to have his number (33) retired.

In 1991 and 1993, Varitek played collegiate summer baseball in the Cape Cod Baseball League (CCBL) for the Hyannis Mets. In 1993, he hit .371 for Hyannis, won the league batting title, and was named the league's MVP. In 2002, he was inducted into the CCBL Hall of Fame. Varitek was a member of the U.S. national baseball team at the 1992 Summer Olympics.

== Professional career ==
=== Seattle Mariners ===
Varitek was drafted 21st overall in the first round by the Minnesota Twins in 1993, but opted to return for his senior year of college. Following graduation, Varitek signed with agent Scott Boras and was drafted by the Seattle Mariners in the first round of the 1994 amateur draft, with the 14th pick overall. A pioneer of the loopholes in the draft process, Varitek signed with the St. Paul Saints in the independent Northern League before agreeing to terms with the Mariners, and consequently did not enter the Mariners' minor league system until 1995. When he finally did join the franchise, Varitek was sent to the Double-A affiliate Port City Roosters where he first met pitcher and longtime teammate Derek Lowe.

=== Boston Red Sox ===
==== 1997–2002 ====
Varitek was traded with Lowe to the Red Sox during the 1997 season in return for reliever Heathcliff Slocumb, often cited as one of the best trades in the Red Sox's favor in recent history.

Varitek was called up for a single game on September 24, 1997, collecting a single in his only at-bat. During the 1998 season, Varitek split time with incumbent catcher Scott Hatteberg, playing in 86 games. Varitek showed signs of things to come in the season, and with a strong spring training the following season, earned the starting catcher position.

The year 1999 was a breakout season for the catcher. Varitek played in 144 games, hitting for a .269 average with 20 home runs and 76 RBIs. Varitek went 5–21 with 3 RBI in the 1999 American League Division Series (ALDS) against the Cleveland Indians and 4–20 with one RBI in the American League Championship Series (ALCS) against the New York Yankees. During the ALDS, he set a postseason record by scoring five runs in a game.

Looking forward to building more success upon the year before, the 2000 season was a disappointment offensively, producing a .248 average with only 10 home runs and 65 RBI, as the Red Sox did not qualify for the postseason. Prior to the 2001 season, Varitek signed a three-year, $14.9 million contract extension with Boston. Varitek went on a hitting hot streak, homering three times in one game on May 20 and posting a .310 batting average through May 23. However, a broken left elbow injury sidelined him for the rest of the season, as he dove to catch a foul ball on June 7. The play went on to be a top Web Gem for the month of July 2001. Varitek finished the season with a .293 average, seven home runs, and 25 RBI in 51 games.

==== 2003–2004 ====
Varitek returned to the Red Sox lineup full-time in the 2002 season. The return did not go smoothly, however, as he struggled to find himself at the plate. Despite not reaching his full offensive potential, pitchers and coaches alike began to notice how much Varitek's preparation and knowledge of the game was helping the pitchers. His study habits and extra hours of work with pitchers would soon become his defining attribute. Varitek and the Red Sox entered the 2003 season with a renewed fire to reach the playoffs after missing in the previous three years. Varitek instantly became a leader in the clubhouse, featuring new faces such as Kevin Millar, David Ortiz, Bill Mueller, and Todd Walker along with original players Trot Nixon and Lou Merloni. The 2003 season was Varitek's best to date and he earned his first All-Star selection after the fans voted him in with the All-Star Final Vote. He was hitting .296 with 15 home runs and 51 RBI when he was chosen and finished the season with a solid .273 average, 25 home runs and 85 RBI, all career highs. The Red Sox earned a Wild Card berth and their first playoff appearance since 1999, before losing the 2003 ALCS to the Yankees.

In 2004, Varitek compiled a career-high .296 batting average with 18 home runs and 73 RBI. During a nationally televised game on July 24, Varitek shoved his glove into the face of the Yankees' Alex Rodriguez after Rodriguez was hit by a pitch and gestured towards pitcher Bronson Arroyo, causing a bench-clearing brawl. Though he was ejected (along with Rodriguez) from the game, the Red Sox, spurred on by the fight, came back to win 11–10. It is also sometimes regarded as the turning point in the Red Sox' season, as they posted MLB's best record after the melee. Boston culminated the season with its first World Series championship in 86 years, after being the first MLB team to overcome a three games to none deficit, doing so in the ALCS against the Yankees. Varitek went 3-for-4 in the crucial Game 6 (the "Bloody Sock game" in the ALCS which Boston won 4–2).

After the season, Varitek became a free agent and signed a four-year, $40-million contract with the Red Sox.

==== 2005–2011: Captain ====
After re-signing, the Red Sox appointed Varitek team captain, only the fourth Red Sox player so honored since 1923, following Hall of Famers Jimmie Foxx (1940–1942), Carl Yastrzemski (1966 and 1969–1983) and Jim Rice (1986–1989). Varitek was one of just three captains then in MLB (the others were Derek Jeter of the Yankees and Paul Konerko of the Chicago White Sox). Varitek remained captain until his retirement after the 2011 season. He wore a "C" patch on his uniform, making him the first player to do so in a World Series.

In 2005, Varitek won his first Gold Glove Award, his first Silver Slugger, and his second All-Star selection.

In 2006, Varitek represented the United States in the World Baseball Classic, playing in three games. He made the most of his playing time, hitting a grand slam against Canada allowing the U.S. to narrow an 8–2 deficit to 8–6. Canada, however, kept the lead in the upset victory.

On July 18, Varitek played his 991st game at catcher for the Boston Red Sox, breaking Carlton Fisk's club record. That game was a home game against the Kansas City, during which his achievement was recognized before the bottom of the fifth inning (when the game became official and could not be cancelled due to weather). Varitek received a standing ovation from the sellout crowd at Fenway Park for a few moments before play resumed. On July 31, 2006, Varitek was injured rounding the bases in a 9–8 victory over the Cleveland Indians (his 1,000th career game as catcher), but said he believed the initial injury to the knee occurred while he was blocking home plate to make the tag against the Angels Mike Napoli on July 29. He had surgery on August 3, to repair torn cartilage in his left knee. Varitek returned to the Red Sox lineup on September 4 following a short rehabilitation assignment in Pawtucket.

On September 19, Varitek was honored during a pre-game ceremony as the first Red Sox catcher to catch 1,000 games. He was presented with a special award by Fisk, who held the Boston club record with 990 career games caught. By the evening of the ceremony, Varitek had appeared in 1,009 games behind the plate. That same night, Varitek also received the 2006 Red Sox Heart and Hustle Award from the local chapter of the MLB Players Alumni Association, which is presented to a player exemplifying the values, tradition, and spirit of the game of baseball.

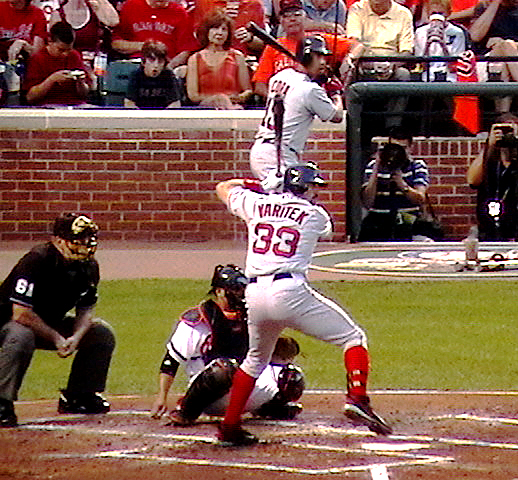
Varitek at bat in 2008

In 2007, Varitek and the Red Sox returned to the World Series, winning for the second time in four years. During the season, Varitek recorded his 1,000th career hit. On May 19, 2008, he caught Jon Lester's no-hitter, giving him a major league record of having caught four no-hitters in a career.

In honor of being captain, Varitek released Captain Cabernet, a charity wine with proceeds benefiting Pitching In For Kids and Boston Children's Hospital.

At the end of the 2008 season, Varitek elected free agency. Reports in the Boston Globe suggested his agent, Scott Boras, was using Yankees catcher Jorge Posada's four-year, $52.4 million deal as a benchmark for negotiations. On February 6, 2009, Varitek signed a new one-year deal with the Red Sox worth $5 million with a $5 million club option or $3 million player option for 2010. During the 2009 season, Varitek's numbers were similar to his dismal 2008 season, with slightly more home runs (14), doubles (24), and runs batted in (51), and a higher slugging percentage (.390) despite a lower batting average (.209) and fewer at bats (425). He eventually became the backup catcher when the Red Sox acquired All-Star Victor Martinez at the July 31 trade deadline.

On December 2, 2010, Sports Illustrated reported Varitek signed a one-year, $2 million deal to stay with the Red Sox for the 2011 season. The deal was finalized on December 10. With the addition of Jarrod Saltalamacchia, Varitek usually came off the bench during the 2011 season, playing in 68 games, hitting .221 with 11 home runs, 36 RBI, with a .300 on-base percentage.

After the 2011 season, Varitek became a free agent again and was offered a minor league contract with an invitation to spring training by the Red Sox. On March 1, 2012, at JetBlue Park in Fort Myers, Florida, Varitek officially announced his retirement.

Ryan Lavarnway, a fellow catcher and teammate of Varitek in 2011, listed the Boston veteran as his favorite player growing up. "Varitek has set the gold standard for the position, catching four no-hitters and winning two World Series. He’s a true professional in handling a pitching staff and is something I’d like to become as my career progresses."

== Post-playing career ==
On September 27, 2012, then-Red Sox general manager Ben Cherington announced Varitek was named special assistant to the general manager. In that role, Cherington said Varitek would be involved in areas such as "major league personnel decisions, evaluations, and mentorship and instruction of young players." In March 2018, his role was "special assistant to the president of baseball operations". After not appearing in the team's front-office directory during the 2019 season, in 2020 he was listed as "special assistant / catching coach". On November 20, 2020, Varitek was named to the uniformed coaching role of game planning coordinator on the staff of manager Alex Cora. His title was changed to player information coach before the 2021 season. On November 2, 2022, Varitek signed a three-year contract extension to remain on Boston's coaching staff. He confirmed in late 2025 he would remain with the Red Sox in 2026. On April 25, 2026, he was reassigned to a new role as part of a coaching overhaul following a 10–17 start to the season. However, MassLive reported Varitek chose not to accept the reassignment. At the end of the season, Red Sox leadership stated that Varitek was no longer part of the organization.

== Records and awards ==
=== Georgia Tech records ===
- Most career games played (253)
- Most career base hits (351)
- Most career home runs (57)
- Most career runs batted in (251)
- Most career runs scored (261)
- Most career doubles (82)
- Most career total bases (610)
- Most single-season walks (76 in 1994)

=== College awards and achievements ===
- His number 33 is only the second number ever retired by Georgia Tech; the first was number 44, worn by Coach Jim Luck
- Baseball America's 1993 player of the year
- Named by Baseball America to "All-Time College All-Star Team"
- 1994 Golden Spikes Award
- 1994 Rotary Smith Award
- 1994 Dick Howser Trophy
- Three-time consensus All-American (1992, '93, '94)
- Inducted into Georgia Tech Hall of Fame
- Inducted into Cape Cod Baseball League hall of fame
- 1994 College World Series runner-up

=== MLB career ===
- Three-time All-Star (2003, 2005 and 2008), one-time starter (2005)
- Two-time World Series champion (2004, 2007)
- 2005 Silver Slugger Award winner
- 2005 Gold Glove winner
- 2006 Heart and Hustle Award
- Has caught four no-hitters, a record now shared with Carlos Ruiz. (Ruiz has one team no-hitter and three solo no-hitters.
- Only catcher to catch four no-hitters by four different starting pitchers.

=== Red Sox milestones and achievements ===
- Became 26th player to hit 100 home runs for club on April 14, 2005
- Third Red Sox catcher to win a Gold Glove (Carlton Fisk and Tony Peña)
- First Red Sox at any position to win Gold Glove since Peña in 1991
- 1,488 games caught – most in franchise history – breaking Fisk's club record of 990 on July 18, 2006 vs. Kansas City
- Has caught a major league record four official no-hitters
  - Hideo Nomo: April 4, 2001, vs. Baltimore
  - Derek Lowe: April 27, 2002, vs. Tampa Bay
  - Clay Buchholz: September 1, 2007, vs. Baltimore (Buchholz's no-hitter was his second major league start)
  - Jon Lester: May 19, 2008, vs. Kansas City
  - Does not count the five-inning, rain-shortened no-hit game by Devern Hansack in 2006, which is not considered an official no-hitter.
- Most postseason home runs for a catcher (11, tied)
- One of only six catchers to have at least two triples in the playoffs (2)
- Most Opening Day starts for a Red Sox catcher

=== Notable first ===
- In the 2004 World Series, Varitek batted against the St. Louis Cardinals' Jason Marquis, the first time two former Little League World Series participants have faced each other in the MLB World Series. Varitek had played for Altamonte Springs, Florida, in 1984.

== Personal life ==
In 2005, Varitek identified as an evangelical Christian.

Varitek has three daughters from his previous marriage. He and his first wife divorced in 2008. He married his second wife on November 26, 2011, and their first child was born on May 26, 2012. They reside in Hingham, Massachusetts.

== See also ==
- 1992 College Baseball All-America Team
- 1993 College Baseball All-America Team
- Boston Red Sox Hall of Fame
- List of Boston Red Sox award winners
- List of Georgia Institute of Technology athletes
- List of Major League Baseball career games played as a catcher leaders
- List of Major League Baseball career putouts as a catcher leaders
- List of Major League Baseball players who spent their entire career with one franchise
- List of people from Detroit
