= Captain (baseball) =

Honorary title in baseball

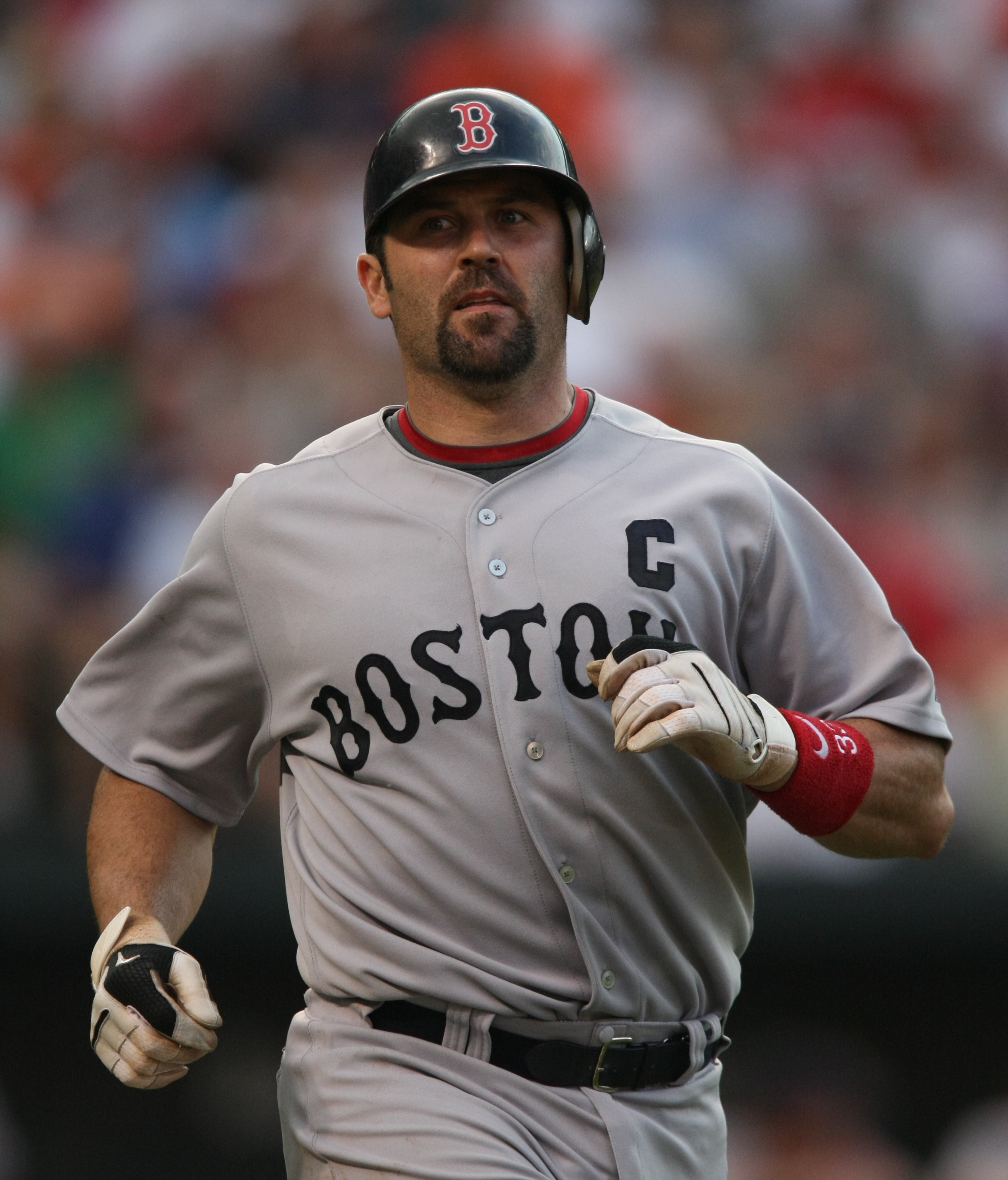
Jason Varitek of the Boston Red Sox with a captain insignia on his chest

In baseball, a captain is an honorary title sometimes given to a member of the team to acknowledge his leadership. Few Major League teams today have captains. In the early days of baseball, a captain was a player who was responsible for many of the functions now assumed by managers and coaches, such as preparing lineups, making decisions about strategy, and encouraging teamwork. In amateur or youth baseball, a manager or coach may appoint a team captain to assist in communicating with the players and to encourage teamwork and improvement.

The official rules of Major League Baseball (MLB) only briefly mention the position of team captain. Official Baseball Rule 4.03 Comment (formerly Rule 4.01 Comment), which discusses the submission of a team's lineup card to the umpire, notes that obvious errors in the lineup should be brought to the attention of the team's manager or captain.

Only a few major league teams have had captains in recent years, two examples being Adrián Beltré of the Texas Rangers and David Wright of the New York Mets, both of whom served in the role from 2013 through 2018. As of the 2026 season, the New York Yankees, Kansas City Royals, and Milwaukee Brewers are the only teams with captains; Aaron Judge was named the Yankees' captain on December 21, 2022, Salvador Pérez was named the Royals' captain on March 30, 2023, and Christian Yelich was named the Brewers’ captain on September 26, 2026. Jerry Remy, who was named as captain of the California Angels in 1977 at age 24, explained that in today's modern age of baseball, "there's probably no need for a captain on a major league team. I think there are guys who lead by example. You could name the best player on your team as captain, but he may not be the guy other players will talk to or who will quietly go to other players and give them a prod."

Baseball captains in MLB generally do not wear an NFL or NHL-style "C" on their jersey. Mike Sweeney, captain of the Kansas City Royals from 2003 to 2007, wore the "C" patch, as did John Franco and Keith Hernandez of the Mets, Barry Larkin of the Cincinnati Reds and Jason Varitek of the Boston Red Sox. Brandon Belt of the San Francisco Giants wore an unofficial "C" patch (made from electrical tape) in a game on September 10, 2021, as a joke. Of the current captains in MLB, only Salvador Pérez and Yelich wear a "C" patch or letter.

== History ==
Jack Doyle, 1902 captain of the New York Giants

In the 19th and early 20th century, the captain held most of the on-field responsibilities that are held by managers and coaches in modern baseball. For example, according to the 1898 official rules, the captain was responsible for assigning the players' positions and batting order, for appealing to the umpire if he observed certain violations (for example, if the other team intentionally discolored the ball or its players illegally left the bench), and for informing the umpire of any special ground rules. During a period when teams didn't carry full-time coaches, the captain and one or more other players could serve as "coachers" of the base runners; the lines setting off the section where they were allowed to stand were designated as "captain's lines." If the umpire made a decision that could "be plainly shown by the code of rules to have been illegal", the "captain alone shall be allowed to make the appeal for reversal." The rules stated that the captain must be one of the nine players, implying that a non-playing manager would not have been allowed to act in the captain's role. In contrast with modern baseball, the 1898 rules did not mention the managers having any rights to interact with the umpires. The rules allowed managers to sit on the team's bench during the game, but were otherwise silent with respect to rights and responsibilities of managers.

In early baseball, many teams had playing managers who had both the off-field responsibilities of managers and the on-field responsibilities of captains. They held the title of "manager-captain." In contrast, teams that had non-playing managers hired a player to serve as captain. For example, in early 1902, Jack Doyle was signed as captain and first baseman of the New York Giants while non-player Horace Fogel was manager.

The role of captain has been significant in the histories of some teams, such as the Yankees, Red Sox, and Giants. Conversely, some teams have never named a captain, such as the Tampa Bay Rays.

== Lists of major league team captains ==
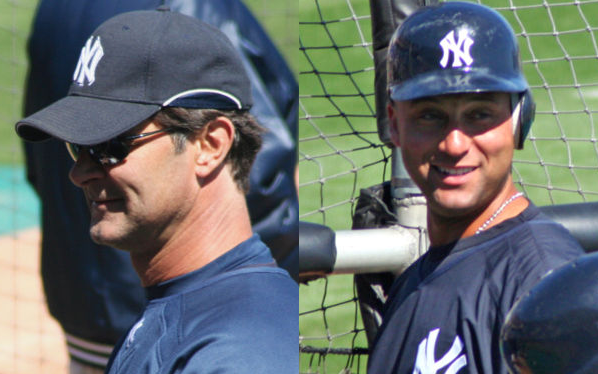
Two recent captains of the New York Yankees, Don Mattingly (left) and Derek Jeter

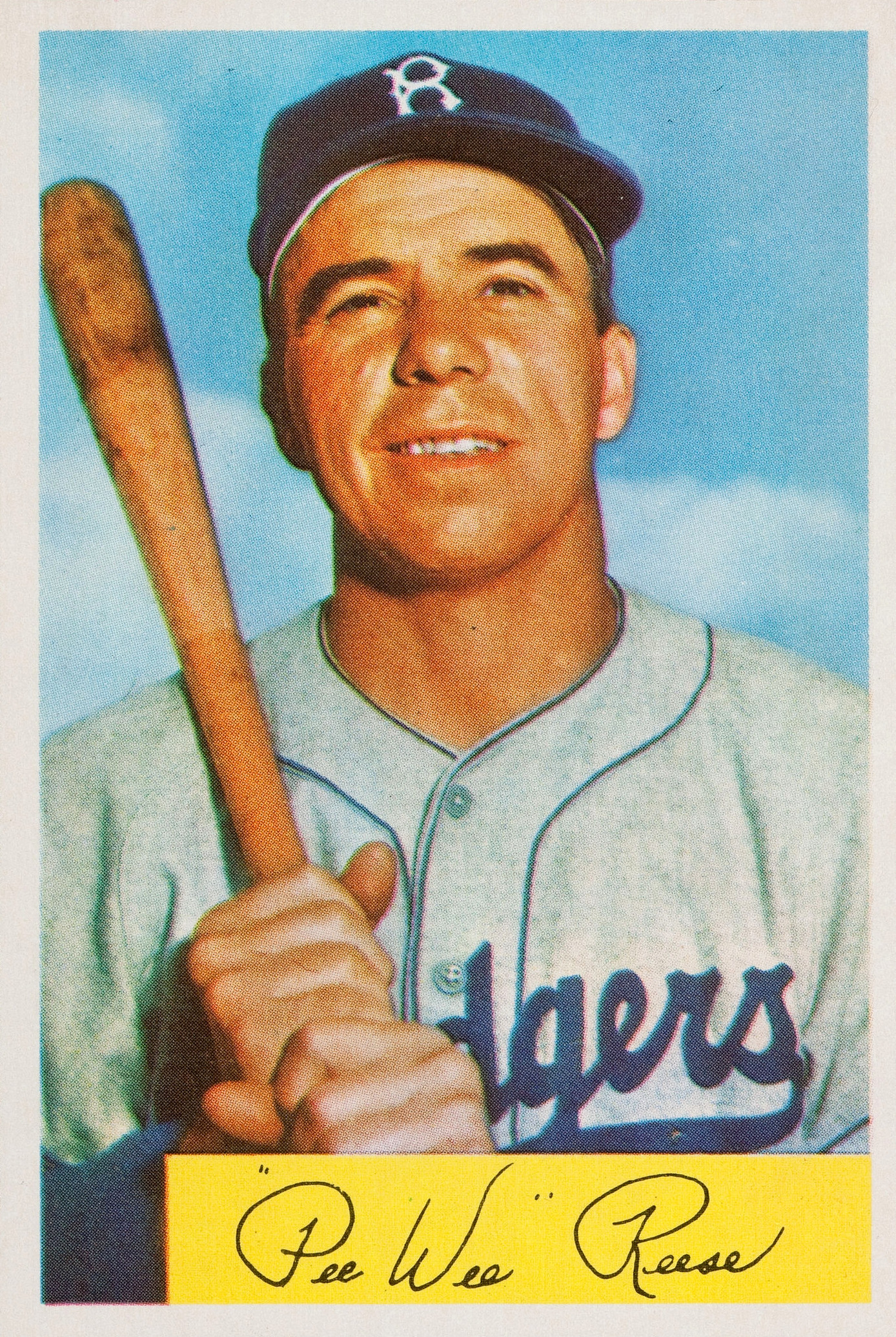
Pee Wee Reese, captain of the Brooklyn Dodgers in the 1950s

- List of Baltimore Orioles captains
- List of Boston Red Sox captains
- List of Chicago White Sox captains
- List of Cincinnati Reds captains
- List of Detroit Tigers captains
- List of Houston Astros captains
- List of Kansas City Royals captains
- List of Los Angeles Angels captains
- List of Los Angeles Dodgers captains
- List of Minnesota Twins captains
- List of Milwaukee Brewers captains
- List of New York Mets captains
- List of New York Yankees captains
- List of Oakland Athletics captains
- List of Philadelphia Phillies captains
- List of Pittsburgh Pirates captains
- List of San Francisco Giants captains
- List of St. Louis Cardinals captains
- List of Texas Rangers captains
