= Fred Payne (baseball) =

American baseball player (1879–1954)

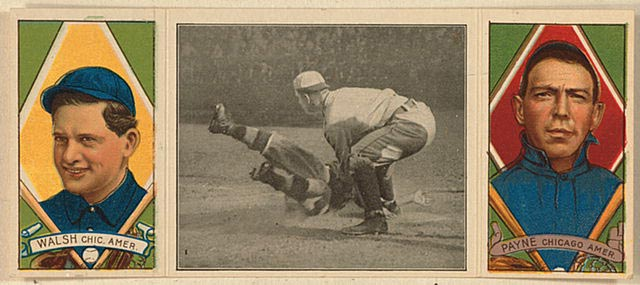
- Fred Payne, Hassan triple folder baseball card
- Catcher
- Born: September 2, 1879; Camden, New York, U.S.
- Died: January 16, 1954 (aged 74); Camden, New York, U.S.
- Batted: Right Threw: Right

MLB debut
- April 21, 1906, for the Detroit Tigers

Last MLB appearance
- September 4, 1911, for the Chicago White Sox

MLB statistics
- Batting average: .215
- Home runs: 1
- Runs batted in: 86
- Stats at Baseball Reference

Teams
- Detroit Tigers (1906–1908); Chicago White Sox (1909–1911)

Alfred Thomas Payne (September 2, 1879 – January 16, 1954) was an American Major League Baseball player who played six seasons in the major leagues with the Detroit Tigers (1906–1908) and Chicago White Sox (1909–1911). He played in a total of 334 major league games, of which 271 were as a catcher.

== Early years ==
Payne was born in Camden, New York, in 1879.

== Professional baseball ==
He began playing professional baseball with the Syracuse Stars in the New York State League. He appeared in 216 games for Syracuse from 1902 to 1904. He also played for Rochester 1905.

In October 1905, he was drafted by the Detroit Tigers from Rochester in the Rule 5 draft. He remained with the club from 1906 to 1908, appearing in 145 games, including 110 games at catcher and 23 games in the outfield. In three years with the Tigers, he compiled a .209 batting average He played on the Tigers with Ty Cobb and Sam Crawford that won American League pennants in 1907 and 1908. Payne played two games in the 1907 World Series, with a single in four at bats. He was the only man who ever pinch hit for Ty Cobb in the major leagues. He was brought in as a pinch-hitter for Cobb in 1906, Cobb's first in the major leagues.

In September 1908, the Tigers sold Payne to the Chicago White Sox. He played for Chicago from 1909 to 1911, appearing in 189 games, including 161 games at catcher and five in the outfield.

Payne had a career batting average of .215 and had 194 hits, 86 RBIs, 82 runs scored, 21 stolen bases, 16 doubles, 12 triples, and 1 home run. Payne died in 1954 at age 73.

Payne continued playing in the minor leagues from 1911 to 1917, including stints with the Baltimore Orioles (1911-1913), Syracuse Stars (1913-1914), Ottawa Senators (1915), Chattanooga Lookouts (1916), and Newport News Shipbuilders (1916-1917).

== Later years ==
He died in Camden, New York, in 1954 at age 75.
