= Kokomo Wild Cats =

- 1890–1909; (1890, 1896, 1899–1900, 1907, 1909); Kokomo, Indiana

Minor league affiliations
- Class: Independent (1890, 1896, 1899–1900); Class D (1907, 1909)
- League: Indiana State League (1890, 1896); Illinois-Indiana League (1899); Indiana State League (1900); Ohio-Indiana League (1907); Northern State of Indiana League (1909)

Major league affiliations
- Team: None

Minor league titles
- League titles (0): None

Team data
- Name: Kokomo (1890, 1896, 1899–1900); Kokomo–Sharpsville (1907); Kokomo Wild Cats (1909)
- Ballpark: Unknown

The Kokomo Wild Cats were a minor league baseball team based in Kokomo, Indiana. Between 1890 and 1909, Kokomo teams played as members of the Indiana State League in 1890, 1896 and 1900, the Illinois–Indiana League in 1899, Ohio-Indiana League in 1907 and Northern State of Indiana League in 1909.

The Kokomo Wild Cats were succeeded by the 1955 Kokomo Giants, who played as members of the Mississippi-Ohio Valley League

== History ==
Kokomo first hosted minor league baseball in 1890. When the Independent level Indiana State League expanded and played as an eight–team league in 1890, the Kokomo team joined the league. The 1890 member teams joining Kokomo to begin the season were teams representing the Indiana cities of Anderson, Bluffton, Elkhart, Fort Wayne Reds, Marion, Muncie and Peru. The Kokomo team finished the season in fourth place with a record of 29–29, playing under manager Frank Jones. Kokomo ended the season in a virtual tie with the Logansport Ottos in the final standings.

The 1896 Kokomo team resumed play as members of the six–team Independent level Indiana State League. The league played briefly, with Kokomo placing third with a 4–4 record. The league began play on July 26, 1986, and folded on August 4, 1896.

The Kokomo team played briefly as members of the 1899 Indiana–Illinois League before relocating. On June 30, 1899, Kokomo had a 21–17 record when the franchise relocated to Mattoon, Illinois. The franchise reportedly relocated to become the Mattoon team when the Kokomo home ballpark went into receivership due to a $125 debt.

In 1900, Kokomo resumed play when the Indiana State League reformed as a six–team league for the 1900 season. On June 10, 1900, the league folded with Kokomo in fifth place with a 8–16 record under manager Edward Hill. When the Logansport/Elwood and Muncie teams both disbanded on June 10, 1900, causing the entire league to fold. Kokomo finished 9.0 games behind the Wabash Farmers, who were in first place with a 19–9 record when the league disbanded.

In 1907, Kokomo partnered with neighboring Sharpsville, Indiana as the Kokomo-Sharpsville team became members of the Class D level Ohio-Indiana League. The team played under manager Frank Morris and finished in third place with a 24–22 record. Kokomo finished 3.5 games behind the first place Decatur Admirals in the final standings of the six–team league. The Ohio-Indiana League did not return to play in the 1908 season.

In 1909, the Kokomo "Wild Cats" became members of the six–team Class D level Northern State of Indiana League. The Wild Cats ended the season in fourth place with a record of 50–53, playing under manager Ed Hill. Kokomo ended the season 15.0 games behind the first place Bluffton Babes, who won the league championship with a 65–38 record. The Kokomo Wild Cats folded after the 1909 season, replaced by the Logansport Whitecaps franchise in the six–team 1910 Northern State of Indiana League.

Kokomo, Indiana was without minor league baseball until 1955, when the Kokomo Giants began play as members of the Mississippi-Ohio Valley League.

Beginning in 2014, Kokomo became home to the collegiate summer baseball level Kokomo Jackrabbits who began play as members of the Northwoods League.

== The ballpark ==
The name of the Kokomo home minor league ballpark in the era is unknown.

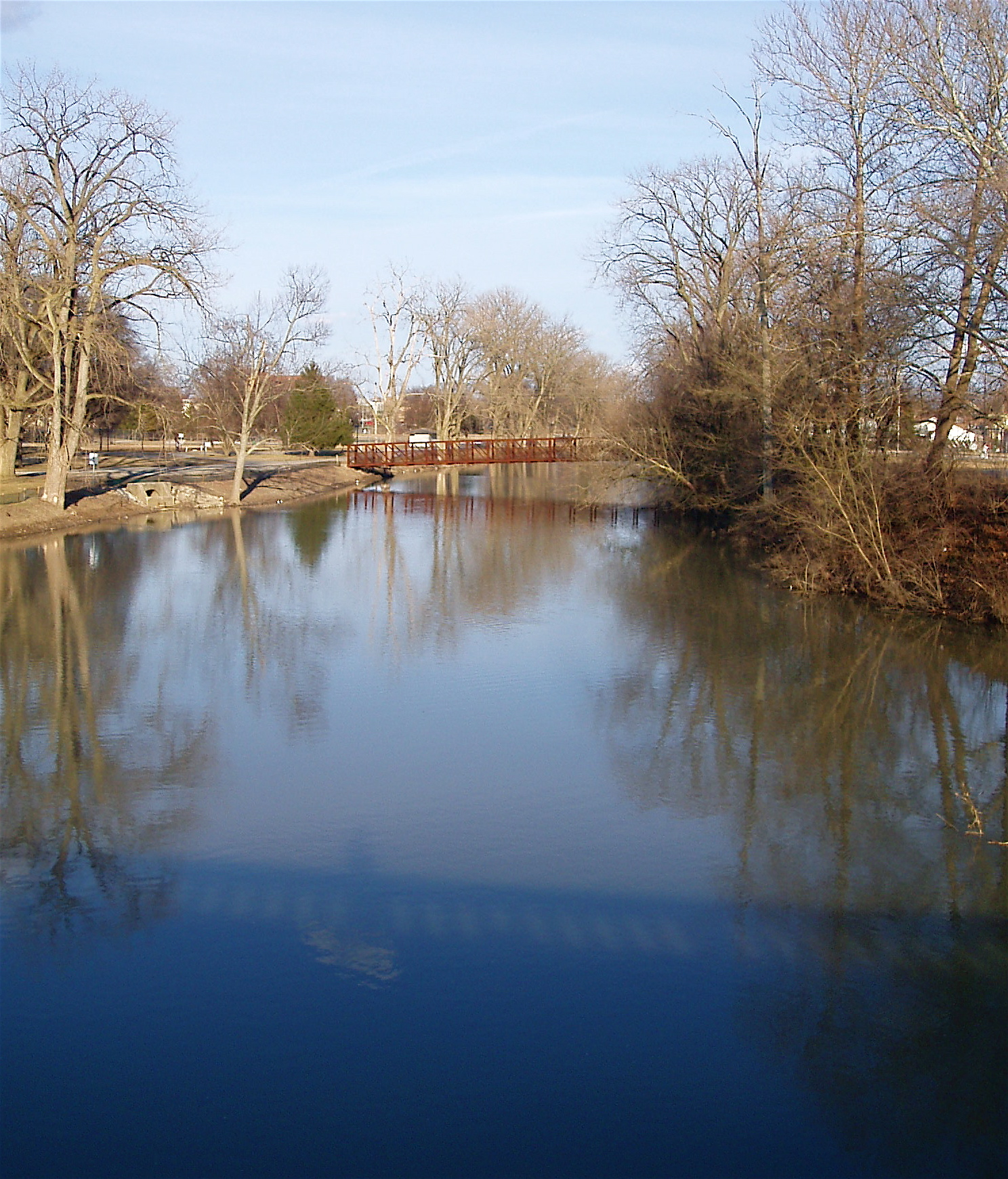
(2008) Wildcat Creek. Kokomo, Indiana.

== Timeline ==
Year(s)	# Yrs.	Team	Level	League
1890, 1896	2	Kokomo	Independent	Indiana State League
1899	1	Kokomo	Independent	Indiana–Illinois League
1900	1	Kokomo	Independent	Indiana State League
1906	1	Kokomo–Sharpsville	Class D	Ohio-Indiana League
1909	1	Kokomo Wild Cats	Class D	Northern State of Indiana League

== Year–by–year records ==
Year	Record	Finish	Manager	Playoffs/notes
1890	29–29	4th	Frank Jones	No playoffs held
1896	4–4	5th	Bob Berryhill	No playoffs held
1899	21–17	NA	NA	Relocated to Mattoon June 30
1900	8–16	5th	Edward Hill	No playoffs held
1907	24–22	3rd	Frank Morris	No playoffs held
1909	50–53	4th	Edward Hill	No playoffs held

== Notable alumni ==
- Con Lucid (1890)
- Everett Scott (1909) Boston Red Sox Hall of Fame
- Ed Smith (1900)
- Cal Vasbinder (1900)

== See also ==
Kokomo Wild Cats players
