= Jake Aydelott =

American baseball player (1861–1926)

- Pitcher
- Born: July 6, 1861; North Manchester, Indiana
- Died: October 22, 1926 (aged 65); Detroit, Michigan
- Batted: Left Threw: Right

MLB debut
- May 15, 1884, for the Indianapolis Hoosiers

Last MLB appearance
- July 12, 1886, for the Philadelphia Athletics

MLB statistics
- Win–loss record: 5–9
- Earned run average: 4.79
- Strikeouts: 35
- Stats at Baseball Reference

Teams
- Indianapolis Hoosiers (1884); Philadelphia Athletics (1886)

Jacob Stuart Aydelott (July 6, 1861 – October 22, 1926) was a professional baseball pitcher. He played parts of two seasons in Major League Baseball, 1884 for the Indianapolis Hoosiers and 1886 for the Philadelphia Athletics.

== Sources ==
- Career statistics from Baseball Reference · Baseball Reference (Minors) · Retrosheet
