= Larry Strands =

American baseball player (1885-1957)

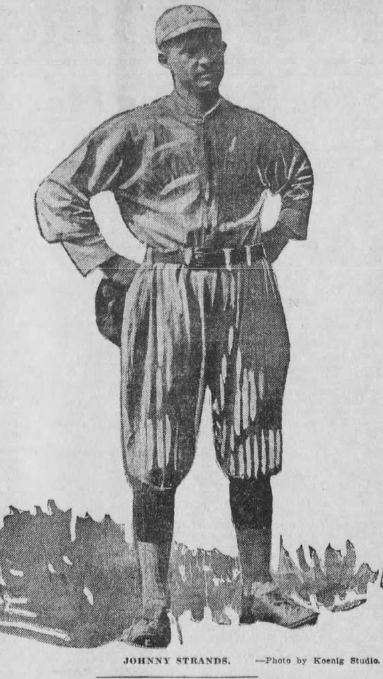
- Third baseman / Second baseman / Outfielder
- Born: December 5, 1885; Chicago, Illinois, U.S.
- Died: January 19, 1957 (aged 71); Forest Park, Illinois, U.S.
- Batted: Right Threw: Right

MLB debut
- April 25, 1915, for the Newark Pepper

Last MLB appearance
- September 7, 1915, for the Newark Pepper

MLB statistics
- Batting average: .187
- Home runs: 1
- Runs batted in: 11
- Stats at Baseball Reference

Teams
- Newark Pepper (1915)

John Lawrence Strands (December 5, 1885 – January 19, 1957) was an American Federal League third baseman, second baseman and outfielder. Strands played for the Newark Pepper in 1915. In 35 career games, he had 14 hits in 75 at-bats. He batted and threw right-handed.

Strands was born in Chicago, Illinois, and died in Forest Park, Illinois.
