= Huntington Johnnies =

- 1908–1911; Huntington, Indiana

Minor league affiliations
- Previous classes: Class D
- Previous leagues: Indiana-Ohio League (1908); Northern State of Indiana League (1909-1911)

Minor league titles
- League titles: 1908‡ ‡ In 1st place when the league folded, no official title awarded

Team data
- Previous names: Huntington Miamis (1908); Huntington Johnnies (1909-1910); Huntington Indians (1911)

The Huntington Johnnies were a minor league baseball, based in Huntington, Indiana, as a member of the Northern State of Indiana League from 1909 to 1911. Prior to being named the Johnnies, the team played as the Huntington Miamis in the short-lived Indiana-Ohio League in 1908. The team changed its name for a final time, in 1911, to the Huntington Indians before folding.

== Team name ==
The "Miamis" name was in reference to the Miami people, a Native-American tribe that inhabited parts of Indiana, Michigan and western Ohio, while the Johnnies name holds various meanings. The name be traced to three Civil War references. The first being John Hunt Morgan, a Confederate general who raided southern Indiana in 1863. The second reference for soldiers in the Union Army, termed "Johnnies", after the song, When Johnny Comes Marching Home. Then the third reference to confederate soldiers known as "Johnny Rebs". However the name can also be a reference to the team's manager from 1909 to 1911, John Lawrence "Larry" "Johnny" Strands. Meanwhile, the "Indians" moniker was a spin-off of the Miami Indian name from the 1908 team.

== Year-by-year records ==
According to the Ball Park Digest, the Huntington Johnnies had a record from 1909 to 1910.

Year	Record	Finish	Manager	Notes
1908	14-10	1st	Jack Smith	League champions League folded in mid-season
1909	61-46	3rd	Larry Strands	No playoffs held
1910	23-41	5th	Larry Strands	No playoffs held
1911	40-30	2nd	Larry Strands	No playoffs held
