= Quincy Gems (affiliated baseball) =

- 1883–1973; (1883–1894, 1889–1892, 1894–1898, 1907–1917, 1925–1932, 1946–1956, 1960–1973); Quincy, Illinois

Minor league affiliations
- Previous classes: Class A (1963–1973); Class A (1894); Class B (1895–1898, 1911–1917, 1925–1932, 1946–1956); Class D (1907–1910, 1960–1962)
- Previous leagues: Midwest League (1960–1973); Illinois-Indiana-Iowa League (1946–1956); Mississippi Valley League (1933); Illinois-Indiana-Iowa League (1911–1917, 1925–1932); Central Association (1908–1910); Iowa State League (1907); Central Interstate League (1889–1890); Western Association (1894–1898); Illinois-Iowa League (1891–1892); Central Interstate League (1889–1890); Northwestern League (1883–1884)

Major league affiliations
- Previous teams: Chicago Cubs (1965–1973); New York Mets (1962–63); San Francisco Giants (1956–60); New York Yankees (1946–1956)

Minor league titles
- League titles: 9 (1889, 1913, 1929, 1931, 1951, 1953, 1954, 1961, 1970)

Team data
- Name: Quincy Cubs (1965–1973); Quincy Gems (1964); Quincy Jets (1962–1963); Quincy Giants (1960–1961); Quincy Gems (1946–1956); Quincy Indians (1928–1933); Quincy Red Birds (1925–1927); Quincy Gems (1913–1917); Quincy Old Soldiers (1912); Quincy Infants (1911); Quincy Vets (1909–1910); Quincy Gems (1907–1908); Quincy Giants (1899); Quincy (1898); Quincy Little Giants (1897); Quincy Blue Birds (1896); Quincy Ravens (1890–1892, 1894); Quincy Black Birds (1889); Quincy Quincys (1883–1884)
- Ballpark: Q Stadium (1946–1973); Eagles Stadium

The Quincy Gems was the primary name of the minor league baseball team in Quincy, Illinois, that played in various seasons from 1883 to 1973.

Quincy teams played as members of the Midwest League (1960–1973), Illinois-Indiana-Iowa League (1946–1956), Mississippi Valley League (1933), Illinois-Indiana-Iowa League (1911–1917, 1925–1932), Central Association (1908–1910), Iowa State League (1907), Western Association (1894–1898), Illinois-Iowa League (1891–1892), Central Interstate League (1889–1890) and Northwestern League (1883–1884). Quincy won league championships in 1889, 1913, 1929, 1931, 1951, 1953, 1954, 1961 and 1970.

Baseball Hall of Fame members Bruce Sutter, Tony Kubek and Whitey Herzog played for Quincy teams.

The Quincy Gems name returned in 2009 with the Gems playing in the collegiate summer Prospect League.

== History ==
Beginning play in 1883, Quincy minor league teams played as members of the Midwest League (1960–1973), Illinois-Indiana-Iowa League (1946–1956), Mississippi Valley League (1933), Illinois-Indiana-Iowa League (1911–1917, 1925–1932). Central Association (1908–1910), Iowa State League (1907), Central Interstate League (1889–1890), Western Association (1894–1898), Illinois-Iowa League (1891–1892), Central Interstate League (1889–1890) and Northwestern League (1883–1884).

After beginning play in 1883 as the Quincy Quincys, the team was first called the "Gems" in 1907 and had various other nicknames. Besided the Gems moniker Quincy minor league teams played as the (Quincy Cubs (1965–1973), Quincy Jets (1962–1963), Quincy Giants (1960–1961), Quincy Indians (1928–1933), Quincy Red Birds (1925–1927), Quincy Old Soldiers (1912), Quincy Infants (1911), Quincy Vets (1909–1910), Quincy Giants (1899), Quincy (1898), Quincy Little Giants (1897), Quincy Blue Birds (1896), Quincy Ravens (1890–1892, 1894), Quincy Black Birds (1889) and Quincy Quincys (1883–1884)).

The team was known as the Quincy Ravens from 1890 to 1892, and then again in 1894. The team played in the Illinois Iowa League in 1891 and 1892, before moving to the Western Association in 1894. They were managed by Sam LaRocque and William Wittrock in 1892. Several major leaguers played for the Ravens, one of the most prominent being Sam Gillen who played for the Pittsburgh Pirates and Philadelphia Phillies. During the 1891 season, Pete Daniels threw 321 innings compiling a 0.79 ERA for the Ravens.

The franchise played in the Western Association (1894–1899), Iowa State League (1907), Central Association (1908–1910), Three-I League (1911–1932, 1946–1956), and the Midwest League (1960–73). They were affiliated with the New York Yankees (1946–1956), the San Francisco Giants (1956–60), New York Mets (1962–63) and the Chicago Cubs (1965–1973).

Overall, the franchise won a total of nine league championships. Quincy captured the Western Association championship in 1889, and Three-I League Championships in 1913, 1929, 1931, 1951, 1953 and 1954. Quincy won the 1961 and 1970 Midwest League Championships, defeating the Waterloo Hawks in 1961 and the Quad City Angels in 1970.

After the 1973 season, the franchise was moved to Dubuque, Iowa playing as the Dubuque Packers in the Midwest League for two seasons, before the franchise was folded and not replaced.

The Gems name returned in 2009 by the collegiate summer Prospect League team called the Gems, who also play at a renovated Q Stadium.

== Ballparks ==
Beginning in 1946, Quincy teams played at Q Stadium.

Previously, the team played at Eagles Stadium, which was located at the same site.

Q Stadium was constructed on the Eagles Stadium site as a Works Project Administration project in 1939. Q stadium is still an active baseball stadium, located at 1800 Sycamore Street, Quincy, IL 62301. The stadium is bounded by Sycamore Street (north, left field); football stadium and North 20th Street (east, right field); Spruce Street (south, first base); and North 18th Street (west, third base).

In 1984, the stadium was purchased by Quincy University from the City of Quincy for $1.00. Today, Q Stadium is home to Quincy University teams and the collegiate summer baseball team of the same name, the new Quincy Gems.

== Year-by-year record ==
Year	Record	Finish	Manager	Playoffs
1897	56-69	6th	Bill Traffley / Eugene McGreevy	
1889	66-50	1st	George Brackett	none League Champs
1890	41-42	4th	Billy Murray	none
1891	65-35	1st	Billy Murray	
1892	12-23	NA	Bill Whitrock (6/15)/ John Godar? / Sam LaRoque	
1907	61-66	6th	Harry Hofer	none
1908	73-55	3rd	Harry Hofer	none
1909	62-73	6th	Louis Cook / Harry Hofer	
1910	88-50	1st	Bade Myers	
1911	71-63	3rd	Bade Myers	none
1912	67-70	4th	Bade Myers	none
1913	79-60	1st	Thomas Hackett / Nick Kahl	League Champs
1914	61-71	6th	Nick Kahl	none
1915	65-56	4th	John Castle	
1916	57-77	7th	John Castle	none
1917	27-38	5th	Ted Waring	Season shortened to July 8
1925	54-82	8th	Newt Hunter (41-68) / Henry Wingfield (13-14)	none
1926	62-75	7th	Henry Wingfield (19-28) / Henry Wetzel (43-47)	none
1927	63-75	6th	Charles Schmidt (3-4) / Mack Allison (22-23) / Charles Knoll (38-48)	none
1928	50-85	8th	Joe Riggert / Hal Irelan	
1929	82-56	1st	Walter Holke	none League Champs
1930	78-58	2nd	Ray Schmidt	
1931	67-49	2nd	Walter Holke	League Champs
1932	38-31	3rd	Syl Simon	Team withdrew July 15, causing league to fold
1933	53-59	4th	Joe Klugmann	
1946	37-82	8th	Edward Marleau / Cedric Durst	
1947	50-75	7th	Gordie Hinkle	
1948	81-45	1st	James Adlam	Lost in 1st round
1949	59-67	5th	James Adlam	
1950	64-60	4th	James Adlam	Lost in 1st round
1951	65-65	3rd	Dutch Zwilling	League Champs
1952	54-72	7th	Paul Chervinko	
1953	70-58	2nd	Vern Hoscheit	League Champs
1954	71-64	4th	Vern Hoscheit	League Champs
1955	52-74	7th	Vern Hoscheit	
1956	56-64	5th	Vern Hoscheit	
1960	55-66	6th	Sam Calderone	none
1961	67-59	4th	Buddy Kerr	League Champs
1962	68-57	4th	Ken Deal	
1963	56-68	9th	Sheriff Robinson / Wally Millies	none
1964	42-78	10th	Jim Finigan / Les Peden	
1965	69-50	2nd	Walt Dixon	none
1966	61-63	5th	Walt Dixon	
1967	58-63	6th	Harry Bright	
1968	59-59	5th	Walt Dixon	
1969	64-55	3rd	Walt Dixon	none
1970	68-45	1st	Walt Dixon	League Champs
1971	61-63	6th	Dick LeMay	
1972	61-67	7th	Dick LeMay	
1973	61-64	7th	Walt Dixon	

== Notable alumni ==
- Whitey Herzog (1952) Inducted Baseball Hall of Fame, 2010
- Tony Kubek (1955) Ford C. Frick Award, 2009
- Bruce Sutter (1973) Inducted Baseball Hall of Fame, 2006
- Hank Bauer (1946) 6x MLB All-Star; 1966 MLB Manager of the Year; Baltimore Orioles Hall of Fame
- Lew Burdette (1948) 2× MLB All-Star; 1957 World Series MVP; Braves Hall of Fame
- Jim Finigan (1964) 2x MLB All-Star
- Jim Ray Hart (1960) MLB all-Star
- Woodie Held (1953)
- Vern Hoscheit (1953-1956)
- Walter Holke (1929)
- Baby Doll Jacobson (1929) .311 Lifetime Batting Average
- Buddy Kerr (1960, MGR) MLB All-Star
- Pete LaCock (1970)
- Dennis Lamp (1973)
- Hal Lanier (1961) MLB MGR: 1986 NL Manager of the Year
- Sam Mertes (1894) 1903 NL RBI Leader
- Joe Niekro (1966) MLB All-Star; Houston Astros Hall of Fame
- Bill North (1970) 1974, 1975 AL Stolen Base Leader
- Fritz Ostermueller (1926) 1938 NL Saves Leader
- Ray Powell (1931)
- Gary Ross (1967)
- Hal Smith (1951)
- Russ Snyder (1954)
- Tom Sturdivant (1948-1950)
- Gus Suhr (1925) MLB All-Star
- Steve Sundra (1932)
- Lee Thomas (1955) 2x MLB All-Star
- Marv Throneberry (1953) Miller Lite commercials
- Hal Trosky (1932) 1936 AL RBI Leader; Cleveland Indians Hall of Fame
- Rabbit Warstler (1927)
- Dutch Zwilling (1951) 1914 NL Home Run Leader; 1915 NL RBI Leader

== See also ==
- Quincy (minor league baseball) players
- Quincy Blackbirds players
- Quincy Bluebirds players
- Quincy Browns players
- Quincy Cubs players
- Quincy Gems players
- Quincy Giants players
- Quincy Indians players
- Quincy Infants players
- Quincy Jets players
- Quincy Little Giants players
- Quincy Old Soldiers players
- Quincy Quincys players
- Quincy Ravens players
- Quincy Red Birds players,
- Quincy Vets players,

== Photos ==
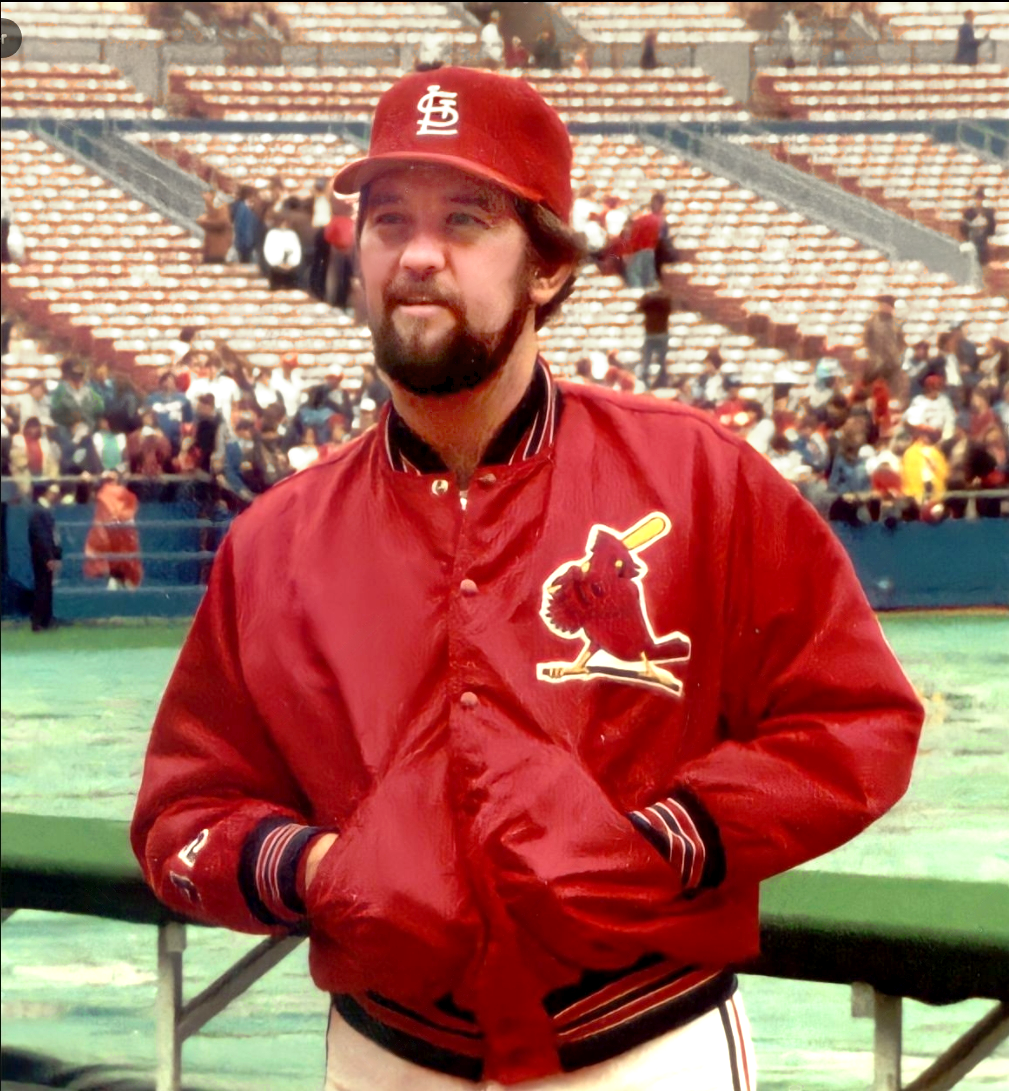
Hall of Fame Pitcher Bruce Sutter

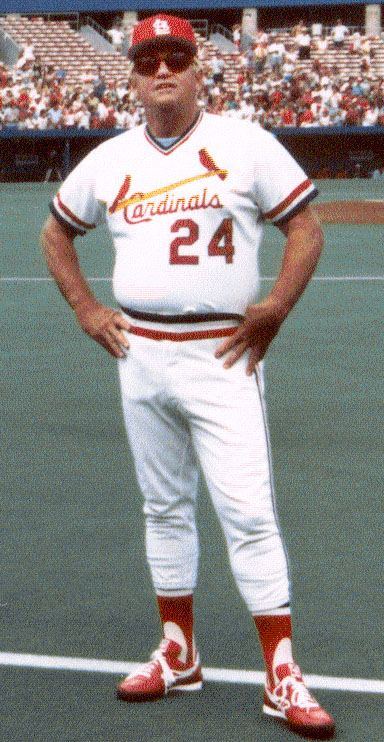
Hall of Famer Whitey Herzog, 1983

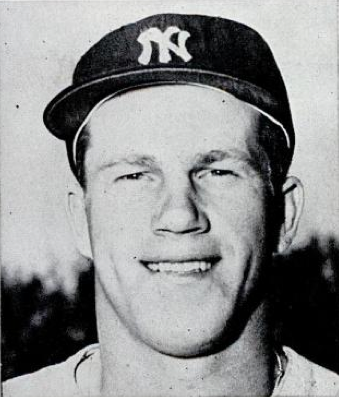
Tony Kubek, 1961

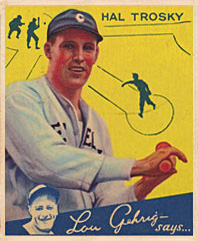
Hal Trosky, Goudey card

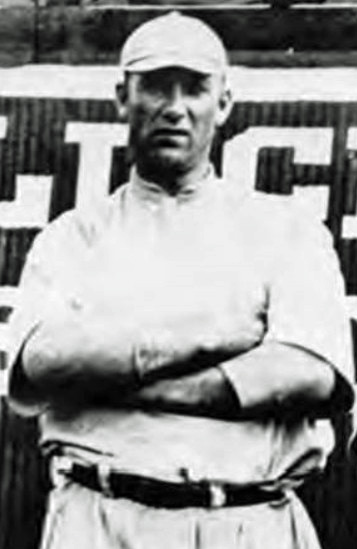
Ed Walker, Quincy Vets, 1910

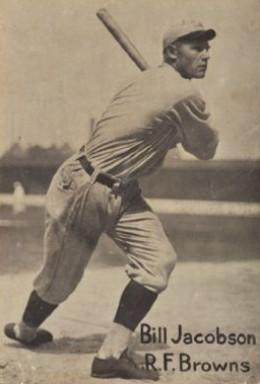
Baby Doll Jacobson, 1919

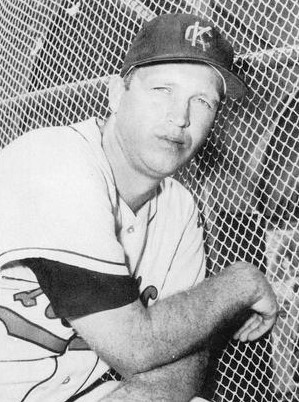
Marv Throneberry, 1961

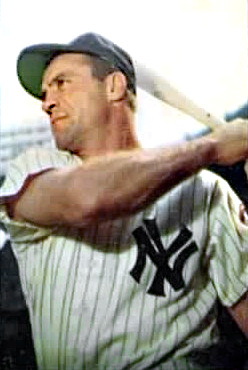
Hank Bauer, 1953
