= Al Piechota =

American baseball player (1914-1996)

- Pitcher
- Born: January 19, 1914; Chicago, Illinois, U.S.
- Died: June 13, 1996 (aged 82); Chicago, Illinois, U.S.
- Batted: Right Threw: Right

MLB debut
- May 7, 1940, for the Boston Bees

Last MLB appearance
- April 26, 1941, for the Boston Braves

MLB statistics
- Win–loss record: 2–5
- Earned run average: 5.66
- Strikeouts: 18
- Stats at Baseball Reference

Teams
- Boston Bees / Braves (1940–1941)

Aloysius Edward "Pie" Piechota (January 19, 1914 – June 13, 1996) was an American professional baseball player whose career spanned 15 seasons, two of which were spent with the Major League Baseball (MLB) Boston Bees / Braves from 1940 to 1941. Piechota, a pitcher, compiled an earned run average (ERA) of 5.66, allowing 39 earned runs off of 68 hits, 6 home runs, and 42 walks while recording 18 strikeouts over 62 innings pitched. Piechota also played in 14 seasons of minor league baseball. He made his MLB debut at the age of 26 and was officially listed as standing 6 feet 0 inches (183 cm) and weighing 195 pounds (88 kg).

== Early life ==
Piechota was born on January 19, 1914, in Chicago. His siblings include two brothers and a sister.

== Professional career ==
Piechota began his professional career in 1933 for the Davenport Blue Sox. In his first professional season, Piechota pitched to a 19–4 win–loss record; his 19 wins led the Mississippi Valley League, while the Blue Sox won the Mississippi Valley League championship. The following season, he recorded a 13–11 record, while the Blue Sox, under manager Cletus Dixon, won a Western League pennant. After spending the 1935 season with the team, Piechota played for the Newark Bears, a Double-A New York Yankees affiliate. He tied Steve Sundra for second most wins on the team (12), and finished second on the Bears in losses (10). After playing for the Bears, Oakland Oaks, and the Kansas City Blues, Piechota played for the Blues for three more years, including a 16 win, 2.88 ERA 1939 season in which the Blues won the American Association pennant, their first in ten years. In September of that year, Piechota was bought by the Boston Bees. In his major league debut, he pitched 2/3 innings, allowing an earned run off of three hits and a walk; for the year, he pitched to a 5.75 ERA, allowing 39 earned runs off of 68 hits. During the 1941 season, Piechota re-signed with the Bees, and, after pitching for an inning, he returned to the minor leagues, playing for the Hollywood Stars and the Toronto Maple Leafs.

He was drafted by the United States military to serve in World War II. In 1944, Piechota was based at the Great Lakes Naval Training Station, and also pitched for a Great Lakes baseball team. The same year, he was transferred to Naval Air Station Bunker Hill in Bunker Hill, Indiana; there, he pitched for the minor-league Michigan City Cubs, and defeated the National League Chicago Cubs after pitching a two-hitter on August 8. After he was discharged from the military, Piechota returned to minor league baseball until his retirement in 1951, playing in the National Baseball Congress with the St Joseph's Autos team in 1946.

== After baseball ==
After retiring from baseball, Piechota served as a police officer for the Chicago Police Department for 25 years, and pitched for their baseball team. He died on June 13, 1996. Funeral services were held on June 17 at St. Juliana Catholic Church in Chicago.
