= Perry Park =

Perry Park can refer to:

- Perry Park, Kentucky, USA
- Perry Park, Colorado, USA
- Perry Park (Iowa), a baseball grounds
- Perry Park, Brisbane, Australia
- Perry Park (Birmingham), England
