= Dubuque, Iowa minor league baseball =

Dubuque Baseball Club
- 1870–1976; (1870, 1879, 1888, 1890, 1895–1899, 1903–1915, 1917, 1922–1932, 1954–1968, 1974–1976); Dubuque, Iowa

Minor league affiliations
- Previous classes: Class A (1963–1968, 1974–1976); Class D (1917, 1922–1932, 1954–1962); Class B (1895–1899, 1903–1915)
- Previous leagues: Midwest League (1956–1968, 1974–1976); Mississippi–Ohio Valley League (1954–1955); Mississippi Valley League (1922–1932); Central Association (1917); Illinois–Indiana–Iowa League (1903–1915); Western Association (1895–1899); Eastern Iowa League (1895); Illinois–Iowa League (1890); Central Interstate League (1888); Northwestern League (1870, 1879)

Major league affiliations
- Previous teams: Houston Astros (1975–1976); Kansas City Royals (1968); Los Angeles Dodgers (1962*, 1967); Cleveland Indians (1961–1966); Pittsburgh Pirates (1959–1960); Chicago White Sox (1954–1958)

Minor league titles
- League titles: 7 (1895, 1905, 1923, 1927, 1929, 1955, 1962)

Team data
- Previous names: Dubuque Packers (1974–1976); Dubuque Royals (1968); Midwest Dodgers* (1962); Dubuque Packers (1954–1967); Dubuque Tigers (1929–1932); Dubuque Dubs (1927–1928); Dubuque Speasmen (1926); Dubuque Ironmen (1925); Dubuque Dubs (1924); Dubuque Climbers (1922–1923); Dubuque Dubs (1917); Dubuque Dubs (1912–1915); Dubuque Hustlers (1911); Dubuque Dubs (1906–1910); Dubuque (1899); Dubuque Tigers (1898); Dubuque Colts (1895); Dubuque (1888, 1890, 1896–1897); Dubuque Red Stockings (1879); Dubuque (1870)
- Previous parks: John Petrakis Field, Municipal Stadium (1915-1976)

Minor league baseball teams have operated in the city of Dubuque, Iowa under a variety of names in various leagues, playing in 52 seasons between 1879 and 1976. Dubuque teams were an affiliate of the Houston Astros (1975–1976), Kansas City Royals (1968), Los Angeles Dodgers (1962*, 1967), Cleveland Indians (1961–1966), Pittsburgh Pirates (1959–1960) and Chicago White Sox (1954–1958).

The Midwest Dodgers (1962), who briefly gave Dubuque a second team in 1962, evolved into today's Fort Wayne TinCaps of the Midwest League.

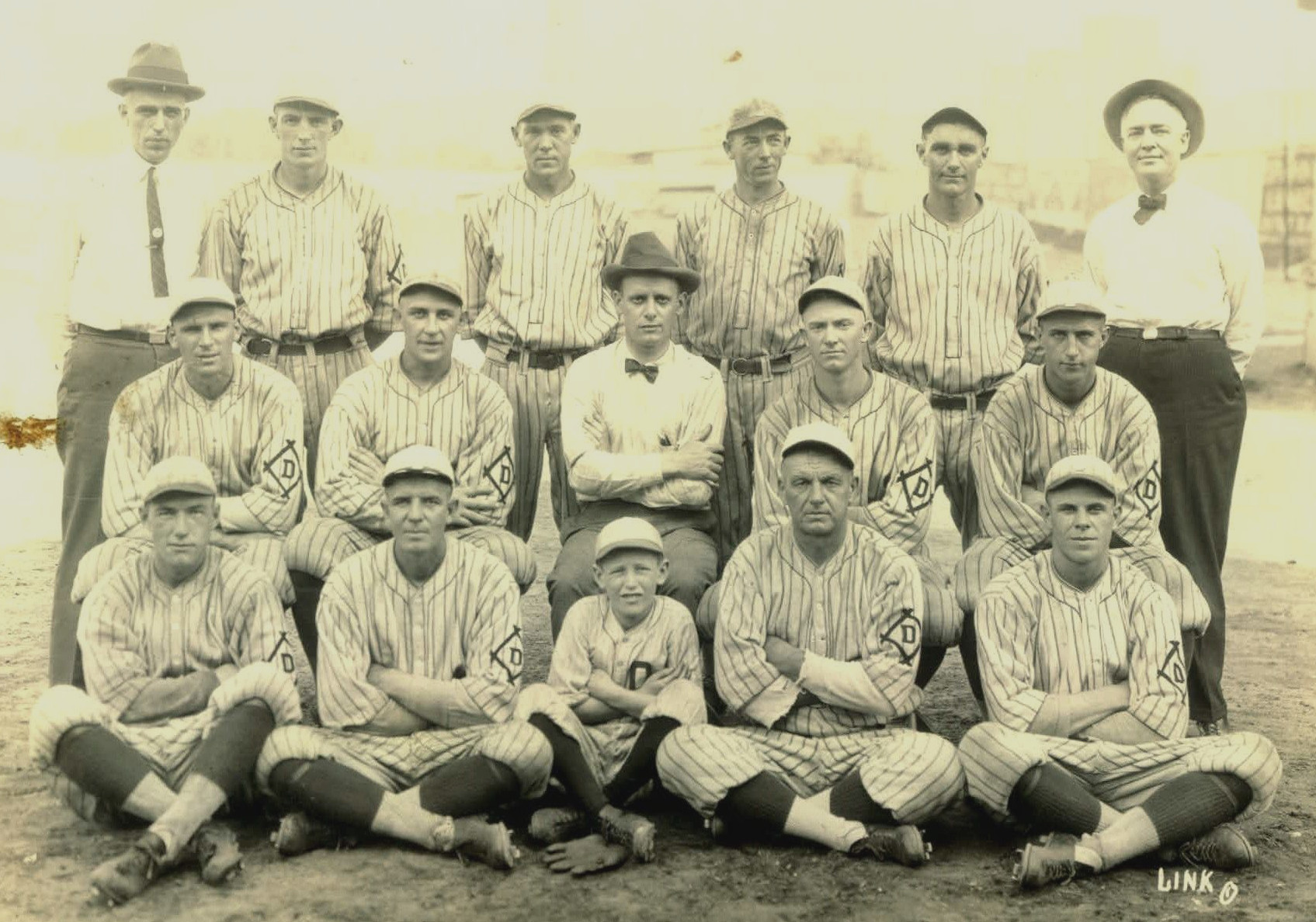
Dubuque Climbers, 1923

== Dubuque baseball history ==
Dubuque debuted playing as members in the Northwestern League in 1870.

The Dubuque Red Stockings played in the Northwestern League in 1879. Dubuque played in the Central Interstate League in 1888, Illinois–Iowa League in 1890, Eastern Iowa League in 1895 and the Western Association from 1895 to 1899.

The Dubuque Shamrocks played in the Illinois–Indiana–Iowa League from 1903 to 1905. During their inaugural season, the club was managed by future World Series-winning skipper Clarence "Pants" Rowland. The Shamrocks won the 1905 Illinois-Indiana-Iowa League Championship.

The Dubuque Dubs played in the Three-I League from 1906 to 1915. The franchise moved to Freeport, Illinois and became the Freeport Comeons on July 14, 1915. Baseball Hall of Fame pitcher Red Faber played for the Dubs in 1909–1910.

The Dubs returned in 1917 playing in the Central Association. The Dubs again moved mid-season, to Charles City, Iowa, where they became the Charles City Tractorites.

The Dubuque Climbers played in the Mississippi Valley League in 1922 and 1923. Baseball Hall of Fame inductee Joe McGinnity played for Dubuque both years, managing the 1923 team. McGinnity was 5–8 in 19 games in 1922. He was 15–12 with a 3.93 ERA in 42 games in 1923, at the age of 53. He led the squad to a first-place finish and the Mississippi Valley League Championship 1923.

After returning to the Dubs name for the 1924 season, the team became the Dubuque Ironmen for 1925. Hall of Fame baseball player Iron Joe McGinnity played for the team.

The name was the Dubuque Speasmen during the 1926 season and was managed by Bill Speas, after whom the team was nicknamed. The team featured multiple players who played or who would go on to play in the major leagues: Estel Crabtree, Luther Harvel, Al Platte and Webb Schultz.

They were once again the Dubs from 1924 to 1928. In 1927, still under manager Speas, they were Mississippi Valley League champions, finishing first in the standings.

They were the Dubuque Tigers from 1929 to 1932 and won a league championship in 1929. Numerous future and former major league players played for the team, including Otto Bluege, Paul Speraw and Biggs Wehde in 1929, Johnny Dickshot, Wally Millies and Wehde in 1930, George Caithamer, Red Lutz, Hal Trosky and Phil Weintraub in 1931, and Maurice Archdeacon, Red Evans and Wehde in 1932. Following the 1932 season, the Tigers folded.

The Dubuque Packers were in the Mississippi–Ohio Valley League from 1954 to 1955. The Packers remained after that league evolved into the Midwest League in 1955. The Packers played in the Midwest League from 1956 to 1968, before returning to play from 1974 to 1976. The Packers won Midwest League Championships in both 1955 and 1962.

In 1962, the Keokuk Dodgers franchise was moved by the Midwest League from Keokuk, Iowa to Dubuque on August 2, 1962, to finish the season as the Midwest Dodgers. The team was an affiliate of the Los Angeles Dodgers. This move briefly gave Dubuque two teams. After the season, the Midwest Dodgers franchise moved and became the Wisconsin Rapids Twins. This franchise evolved into today's Fort Wayne TinCaps of the Midwest League.

After the Packers folded, following the 1968 season, Dubuque was without a team until the Midwest League Quincy Gems franchise moved to Dubuque in 1974. The Packers played in the Midwest League from 1974 to 1976. The Danville Dodgers and Dubuque Packers franchises both folded from the Midwest League after the 1976 season.

== Ballpark ==
From 1915 to 1976, Dubuque teams played at Memorial Stadium / John Petrakis Park. Built in 1914, Memorial Stadium was renamed after the president and GM of the franchise in 1967. Its dimensions were (LF-CF-RF): 340–400–340. The park was prone to flooding. The stadium was located at the 4th Street Extension, before East Dubuque Bridge in Dubuque, Iowa.

== Media ==
The Dubuque Packers were the subject of the documentary A Pitch in Time: The Story of the Dubuque Packers (2013). The documentary was produced and directed by journalist Katlyn Gerken.

== Notable alumni ==
=== Joe McGinnity ===
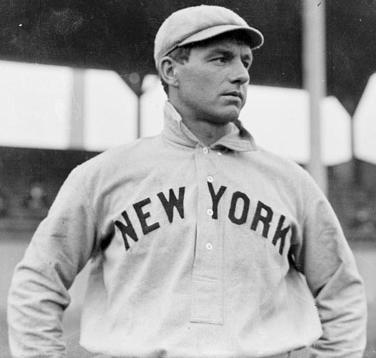
Hall of Fame Player Joe McGinnity, New York Giants, 1905

Nicknamed "Iron Man", Hall of Famer Joe McGinnity was a player/manager for three seasons (1922–23, 1925) in Dubuque, beginning at age 51. In his career, McGinnity won 246 Major League games and 231 Minor League games. Spanning 26 seasons, McGinnity threw 7,210 Innings in winning 485 games. He went 5–8 in 1922, 15–12 in 1923. He then went 6–6 in 1925, his final season to pitch, at age 54.

=== John Petrakis ===
The namesake of the ballpark, John Petrakis served as the President and GM of the franchise. Petrakis was a longtime baseball supporter in Dubuque and was instrumental in youth baseball and minor league baseball. Petrakis was recognized on a National level. In 1956, Petrakis was featured in the Saturday Evening Post and received the "Executive of the Year for minor leagues" by the Sporting News. After the demise of the original ballpark, a new field, within the Gerald McAleece Park & Recreation Complex, was named "John Petrakis Field" and dedicated on May 4, 1986.

=== Notable alumni ===
- Bruce Bochy (1976) 1996 NL Manager of the Year; Manager: 3× World Series Champions (2010, 2012, 2014) San Francisco Giants
- Terry Puhl (1975) MLB All-Star
- Sam Perlozzo (1974)
- Max Lanier (1968) 2x MLB All-Star
- Bill Russell (1967) 3x MLB All-Star
- Steve Yeager (1967) 1981 World Series Most Valuable Player
- Fran Healy (1965–1966)
- Ray Miller (1965)
- Joe Rudi (1965) 3x MLB All-Star
- Dave Nelson (1964) MLB All-Star
- Steve Hargan (1962) MLB All-Star
- Tommy Agee (1961) 2x MLB All-Star; 1966 AL Rookie of the Year; New York Mets Hall of Fame
- Jackie Hernández (1961)
- Tommy John (1961) 4x MLB All-Star; 288 Wins; Tommy John surgery pioneer
- Steve Blass (1960) MLB All-Star
- Gene Alley (1959) 2x MLB All-Star
- Syd Thrift (1959 MGR)
- J. C. Martin (1957)
- Gary Peters (1957) 2x MLB All-Star; 1964 AL Wins Leader; 2x AL ERA Leader (1963, 1966); 1963 AL Rookie of the Year
- Glen Hobbie (1956)
- Deacon Jones (1956) Hit .409, possibly last professional .400 Season
- John Romano (1954) 4x MLB All-Star
- Hal Trosky (1931) 1936 AL RBI Leader; Cleveland Indians Hall of Fame
- Phil Weintraub (1931)
- Estel Crabtree (1926–1927)
- Mel Harder (1927) 4x MLB All-Star; Cleveland Indians No. 18 retired; Cleveland Indians Hall of Fame
- Ernie Johnson (1911)
- George Browne (1898)
- Billy Sullivan (1897)
- Harry Wolverton (1897)

Bob Cluck. Manager 1975–76. Major League Pitching Coach, A's, Astros, and Tigers. 52 years in Professional Baseball.
