= Keokuk Indians =

- 1875–1972; (1875, 1885, 1904–1915, 1929–1933, 1935, 1947–1949, 1952–1962); Keokuk, Iowa

Minor league affiliations
- Class: Independent (1875, 1885); Class D (1904–1915, 1929–1932); Class B (1933); Class A (1935); Class C) (1947–1949); ClassB (1952–1957); Class D (1958–1962)
- League: National Association (1875); Western League (1885); Iowa State League (1904–1907); Central Association (1908–1915); Mississippi Valley League (1929–1933); Western League; Central Association (1947–1949); Illinois–Indiana–Iowa League (1952–1957); Midwest League (1958–1962)

Major league affiliations
- Team: St. Louis Cardinals (1931–1932); Pittsburgh Pirates (1947–1949); Cleveland Indians (1954–1957); St. Louis Cardinals (1958–1961); Los Angeles Dodgers (1962)

Minor league titles
- League titles (2): 1931; 1955

Team data
- Name: Keokuk Westerns (1875); Keokuk Hawkeyes (1885); Keokuk Indians (1904–1915, 1929–1933, 1935); Keokuk Pirates (1947–1949); Keokuk Kernels (1952–1957); Keokuk Cardinals (1958–1961); Keokuk Dodgers (1962); Midwest Dodgers (1962)
- Ballpark: Perry Park (1875); Sportsman's Park (1885); High Banks Park (1885); Hubinger Park (1904–1915); Joyce Park (1929–1933, 1935, 1947–1949, 1952–1962)

The Keokuk Indians were a minor league baseball team based in Keokuk, Iowa. The "Indians" played as members of various minor leagues between 1904 and 1935. Keokuk minor league teams played under other nicknames in the era.

The 1875 Keokuk Westerns were members of the National Association of Professional Base Ball Players, a league that directly evolved to become today's Major League Baseball.

Keokuk hosted minor league teams that subsequently played as members of the 1895 Western League, Iowa League of Professional Baseball Clubs (1904–1907), Central Association (1908–1915), Mississippi Valley League (1929–1933), Western League (1935), Central Association (1947–1949), Illinois–Indiana–Iowa League (1952–1957) and Midwest League (1958–1962).

Keokuk hosted minor league home games at Perry Park (1875), Sportsman's Park (1885), High Banks Park (1885), Hubinger Park (1904–1915) and finally Joyce Park (1929–1933, 1935, 1947–1949, 1952–1962).

Keokuk teams played as minor league affiliates of the St. Louis Cardinals (1931–1932), Pittsburgh Pirates (1947–1949), Cleveland Indians (1954–1957), St. Louis Cardinals (1958–1961) and Los Angeles Dodgers (1962).

The 1955 Keokuk Kernels were ranked 30th in The National Baseball Association's top 100 minor league teams.

Notable alumni include Baseball Hall of Fame member Bud Fowler, as well as Roger Maris and Tim McCarver.

After beginning playing as the Mattoon Indians in 1947, the Keokuk Midwest League franchise of 1958 to 1962 relocated and the franchise has evolved to become today's Fort Wayne TinCaps.

== History ==
Minor league baseball in Keokuk started in 1875. The 1875 Keokuk Westerns played as members of the National Association, a league that directly evolved into today's major League Baseball. On May 4, 1875, the Keokuk Westerns hosted the Chicago White Stockings (present-day Chicago Cubs) and the teams played the first professional baseball game in Iowa.

In 1885, the Keokuk Hawkeyes played one season as members of the Western League. Bud Fowler played for the Hawkeyes and became the first known African-American to play professional baseball, becoming a pioneer for baseball players.

Early Keokuk Indians teams played as members of the Iowa State League (1904–1907), Central Association (1908–1915), Mississippi Valley League (1929–1933) and the Western League (1935). The Indians were affiliated with the St. Louis Cardinals (1931–1932). The Keokuk Indians won the 1931 Mississippi Valley League Championship after a 73–51 season.

From 1947 to 1949, the Keokuk Pirates played in the Central Association as an affiliate of the Pittsburgh Pirates, as the league reformed along with 1947 members Burlington Indians, Clinton Cubs, |Hannibal Pilots, Rockford Rox and the Moline A's. The Keokuk Pirates made the playoffs all three seasons of play in the Central Association, losing in the first round in 1947 and 1949. In 1948, Managed by Phil Seghi, Keokuk defeated the Hannibal Pilots 4–1 in the first round playoffs. They were then defeated by the Clinton Cubs 4 games to 0 in the Finals. The Central Association folded after the 1949 season.

In 1952, Keokuk joined the Illinois–Indiana–Iowa League, playing as the Keokuk Kernels, a moniker derived from The Hubinger Company, a local corn starch producer. The Keokuk Kernels were an affiliate of the Cleveland Indians (1954–1957) The 1955 Kernels captured the Iowa-Illinois-Indiana League Championship. After a 92-34 regular season, Keokuk defeated the Peoria Chiefs 3–0 in the first playoff series. The Kernels defeated the Burlington Bees 3 games to 1 in the 1955 Finals.

The 1955 championship team was ranked thirtieth in the All-Time Top 100 Minor League Teams by Minor League Baseball and historians Bill Weiss and Marshall Wright. A year after having Roger Maris on the roster, the 1955 Keokuk Kernels finished with a record of 92–34 in the Three-I League. Their Manager was former Indiana University Manager Pinky May and the team had several players who made Major League teams, notably Mudcat Grant and Russ Nixon. Finishing 22 games ahead of runner up Waterloo White Hawks, Keokuk's .730 winning percentage was the highest in the last 50 years. Despite their great record, the Kernels drew 39,179 fans for the 1955 season.

In 1957, prisoners at the Iowa State Penitentiary in Fort Madison, Iowaa formed a team called the Fort Madison Prison Chiefs. The Chiefs played the Keokuk Kernels at Joyce Field in an exhibition. The spirit of the game was so successful, Keokuk played inside the prison the next season.

In 1958, the Mattoon Phillies franchise relocated to Keokuk, with the franchise becoming members of the Midwest League. The franchise became the Keokuk Cardinals, playing as a St. Louis Cardinals affiliate (1958–1961). Keokuk became a Los Angeles Dodgers affiliate in 1962. The Keokuk Dodgers were moved by the Midwest League to Dubuque, Iowa, on August 2, 1962, and were renamed the Midwest Dodgers for the duration of the 1962 season.

After the 1962 season, the franchise moved from Dubuque to become the Wisconsin Rapids Twins. Today, the franchise has evolved into the Fort Wayne TinCaps of the Midwest League.

== Hidden home plate microphone ==
In 1958, the Keokuk Cardinals placed a hidden live microphone under the home plate at Joyce Park. The microphone picked up conversations that were fed to the PA system at Joyce Park. The team broadcast the microphone feed of the players' and umpire live talking over the ballpark's PA system during Keokuk home games. The home plate microphone could reportedly pick up all conversations within 30 feet. The home plate microphone was first installed and used on May 16, 1958. Eventually, the natural occurring foul language led to the Keokuk team discontinuing the use of the microphone after the 1958 season. Magazinesof the era, such as Grit (June 1, 1958) and Popular Science (August 1958) had features of the unique home plate microphone installation in Keokuk.

== The ballparks ==
The Keokuk minor league teams between 1929 and 1962 played home games at Joyce Park. The ballpark dimensions were (LF-CF-RF): 320-381-265 (1961) and 306-385-345 (1962). Joyce Park had a capacity of 3,500 (1962). On September 9, 1931, the Indians played an exhibition game at Joyce Park against the St. Louis Cardinals squad, nicknamed the Gashouse Gang. Joyce Park was named after Thomas H. Joyce Sr., who bought the Keokuk Baseball Park and donated it to the city. The address was 3001 Main Street, Keokuk, Iowa.

Keokuk teams of 1904 to 1915 played at home games at Hubinger Park. It was located at North 15th Street & Grand Avenue. The name derived from its location behind the J. C. Hubinger Mansion at Rand Park.

The 1885 Keokuk Hawkeyes team of the Western League played home games at Sportsman's Park. Located at 15th Street & Palean Street. Due to Sunday laws in Iowa, the 1885 team would take a ferry across the Mississippi River to Illinois and play at High Banks Park on Sundays.

The 1875, the Keokuk Westerns played home games at Perry Park. The ballpark was noted to have been located in a field adjoining Rand Park. Rand Park is still in existence today and is located at North 17th Street & Park Land, Keokuk, Iowa.

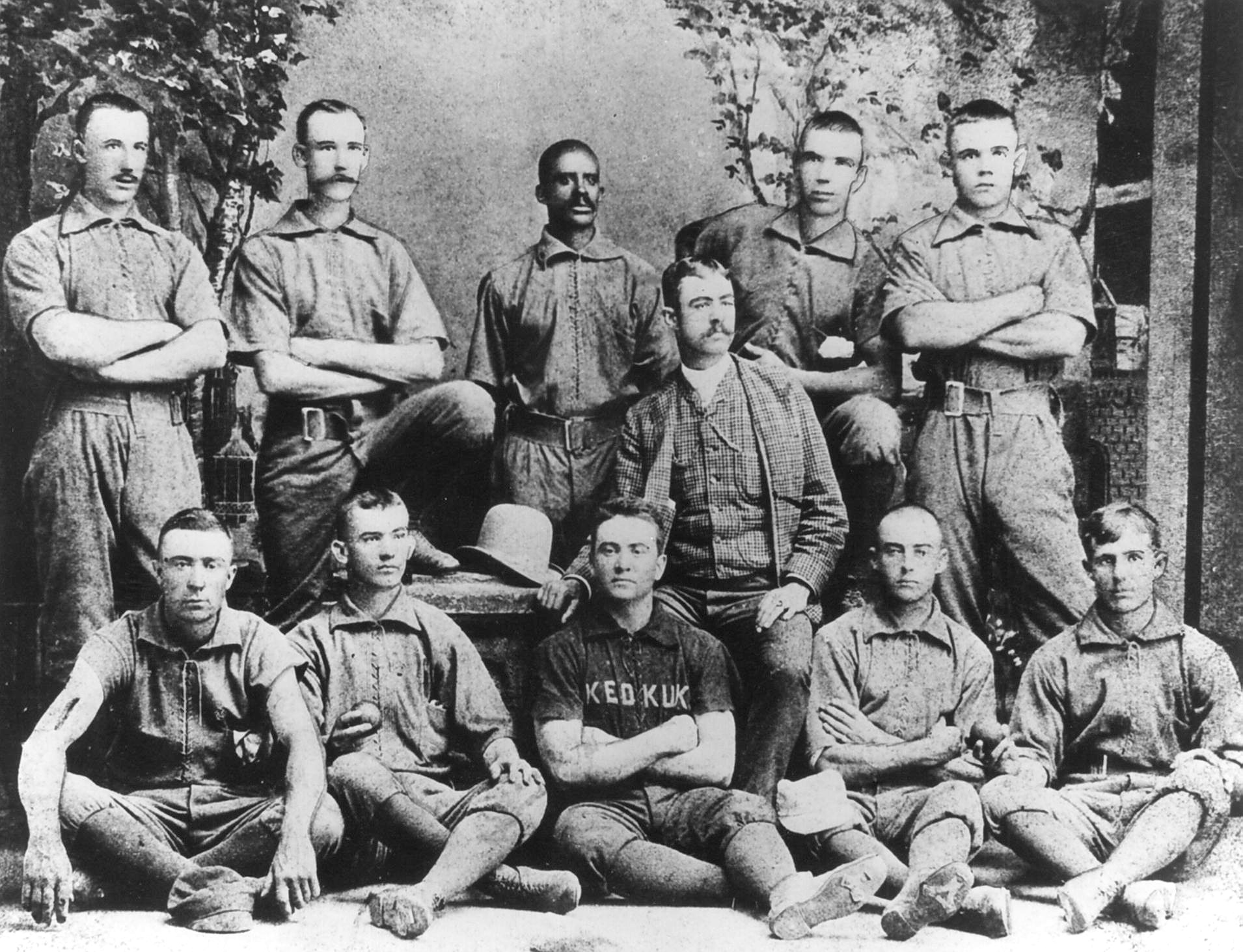
1885 Keokuk, Iowa baseball team featuring Bud Fowler

== Notable Keokuk alumni ==
Notable Keokuk franchise alumni included: Roger Maris, who hit 61 Home runs in 1961 and was 2-time AL Most Valuable Player; Baseball Hall of Fame member Bud Fowler, the earliest known African-American player in organized professional baseball; All-Star player and Hall of Fame announcer Tim McCarver; World Series hero Jesse Barnes; Chautauqua Sports Hall of Fame inductee Ray Caldwell; All-Star Mudcat Grant; Five time MLB All-Star Gus Bell and future MLB Manager Russ Nixon. Announcer Brent Musburger was first an umpire and worked behind the plate for McCarver's first professional game.

== Notable alumni ==
- Bud Fowler (1885) Inducted Baseball Hall of Fame, 2022
- Joe Becker (1930, 1933)
- Gus Bell (1947–48) 4x MLB All-Star; Cincinnati Reds Hall of Fame
- Gordy Coleman (1955)
- Red Corriden (1908)
- Mudcat Grant (1955) MLB All-Star
- Jack Hamilton (1958)
- Dick Hughes (1958)
- Gary Kolb (1960)
- Bobby Locke (1955)
- Roger Maris (1954) 4x MLB All-Star; 61 HR (1961); 2x AL RBI Leader (1960–61); 2x AL Most Valuable Player (1960–1961): Monument Park Yankee Stadium
- Tim McCarver (1959) 2x MLB All-Star; St. Louis Cardinals Hall of Fame
- Bill McGee (1933)
- Hughie Miller (1908–1910)
- Russ Nixon (1955)
- Dan Osinski (1954)
- Phil Seghi (1948, MGR)
- Fred Whitfield (1958)
- Rip Williams (1907)
- Roger Wolff (1931)

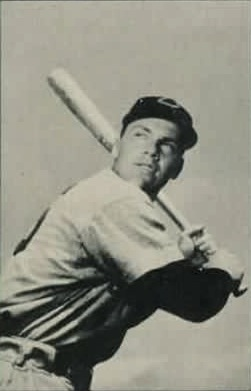
Cincinnati Reds All-Star Outfielder Gus Bell, 1953

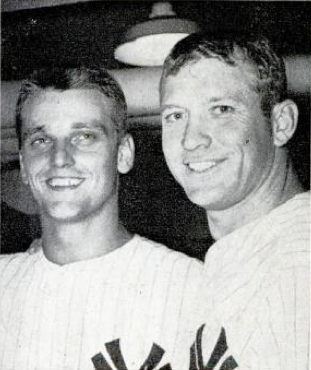
Roger Maris with Mickey Mantle, 1961
