= Ottumwa Cardinals =

The Ottumwa Cardinals were a Class-D Mississippi Valley League minor league baseball team based in Ottumwa, Iowa that played from 1922 to 1925. They were preceded and succeeded by the Ottumwa Packers.

Of note, Jack Saltzgaver and Johnny Welch, who both spent considerable time in Major League Baseball, played for the team. They were managed by Wally Mattick from 1923 to 1925.
