= Joyce Park =

Baseball park in Keokuk, Iowa

- Former names: Keokuk Baseball Park
- Location: Main Street (Hwy 218) and Joyce Park Road
- Owner: City of Keokuk
- Capacity: 3,500 (1962)
- Surface: Grass
- Field size: (LF-CF-RF): 320-381-265 (1961) 306-385-345 (1962)

Construction
- Groundbreaking: 1920
- Built: 1920
- Opened: 1921
- Demolished: 1964

Tenants
- Midwest League; Keokuk Dodgers (1962); Keokuk Cardinals (1958–1961); Illinois–Indiana–Iowa League; Keokuk Kernels (1952–1957); Central Association; Keokuk Pirates (1947–1949); Western League; Keokuk Indians (1935); Mississippi Valley League; Keokuk Indians (1929-1933)

Joyce Park was a minor league baseball park in Keokuk, Iowa.

Joyce Park hosted Keokuk minor league teams in various seasons between 1929 and 1962. The park had dimensions of (LF-CF-RF): 320-381-265 (1961) 306-385-345 (1962) and had a capacity of 3,500 (1962). Notable Keokuk players of the Joyce park era included Home Run record holder Roger Maris and All-Star player and baseball announcer Tim McCarver.

In 1958, a live microphone was placed in home plate at Joyce Park by the Keokuk Cardinals in order to broadcast live player conversations over the PA system. The concept received coverage nationally. However, the experiment was ended due to foul language.

Today, a new park of the same name has been constructed at a different Keokuk location.

== History ==
After early teams played at Hubinger Park, land was purchased privately on June 9, 1920, for what would become Joyce Park. The location at Main Street (Hwy 218) and Joyce Park Road was originally called Keokuk Baseball Park through 1933.

Joyce Park was home to the Keokuk Dodgers (1962), Keokuk Cardinals (1958–1961), Keokuk Kernels (1952–1957), Keokuk Pirates (1947–1949) and Keokuk Indians (1929–1933, 1935) minor league teams. Keokuk played as members of the Midwest League (1958–1962), Illinois–Indiana–Iowa League (1952–1957), Central Association (1947–1949), Western League (1935) and Mississippi Valley League (1929–1933).

The Keokuk teams played as minor league affiliates of the Los Angeles Dodgers (1962), St. Louis Cardinals (1958–1961, 1931–1932), Cleveland Indians (1954–1957) and Pittsburgh Pirates (1947–1949), usually taking the nickname of their affiliate team.

On September 9, 1931, Keokuk Baseball Park hosted a major league team. The Keokuk Indians played an exhibition game at Keokuk Baseball Park against the St. Louis Cardinals, then nicknamed the Gashouse Gang.

On September 10, 1934, Thomas H. Joyce bought the baseball park. Joyce deeded the land to the city of Keokuk under the conditions it remain a baseball park. The ballpark then took his name.

In 1957, prisoners at the Iowa State Penitentiary in Fort Madison, Iowa formed a team called the "Fort Madison Prison Chiefs." The Chiefs played the Keokuk Kernels at Joyce Field in an exhibition. The spirit of the game was so successful, the Kernels played inside the prison the next season.

== Home plate microphone ==
In 1958, the Keokuk Cardinals placed a hidden live microphone under home plate at Joyce Park. The purpose was to broadcast the player and umpire conversations and broadcast them live for fans over the PA system. The installed microphone reportedly picked up conversations within thirty feet. The first usage of the home plate microphone was on May 16, 1958. However, foul language led to discontinuing the live microphone after the 1958 season. Magazines Grit (June 1, 1958) and Popular Science (August 1958) did feature stories on the Keokuk microphone broadcasting.

After minor league baseball left Keokuk in 1962, the first Joyce Park was demolished in 1964. Today, a new Joyce Park, with baseball and softball fields, sits on 54 acres at 3574 Highway 218 (US Highway 218 at Highway 61), Keokuk, Iowa.
