= List of New York Mets minor league affiliates =

Locations of New York Mets' current top three minor league affiliates.

The New York Mets farm system consists of seven Minor League Baseball affiliates across the United States and in the Dominican Republic. Four teams are owned by the major league club, while three—the Syracuse Mets, Binghamton Rumble Ponies, and St. Lucie Mets—are independently owned.

The Mets have been affiliated with the Double-A Binghamton Rumble Ponies of the Eastern League since 1992, making it the longest-running active affiliation in the organization among teams not owned by the Mets. The longest affiliation in team history was the 38-year relationship with the Triple-A International League's Tidewater/Norfolk Tides from 1969 to 2006. Their newest affiliate is the Syracuse Mets of the International League, which became the Mets' Triple-A club in 2019.

Geographically, New York's closest domestic affiliate is the High-A Brooklyn Cyclones of the South Atlantic League, which are located approximately 15 miles (24 km) away. New York's furthest domestic affiliates are the Single-A St. Lucie Mets of the Florida State League and the Rookie Florida Complex League Mets, which share a facility some 1,001 miles (1,611 km) away.

== Current affiliates ==
The New York Mets farm system consists of seven minor league affiliates.

Class	Team	League	Location	Ballpark	Affiliated
Triple-A	Syracuse Mets	International League	Syracuse, New York	NBT Bank Stadium	2019
Double-A	Binghamton Rumble Ponies	Eastern League	Binghamton, New York	Mirabito Stadium	1991
High-A	Brooklyn Cyclones	South Atlantic League	Brooklyn, New York	Maimonides Park	2001
Single-A	St. Lucie Mets	Florida State League	Port St. Lucie, Florida	Clover Park	1988
Rookie	FCL Mets	Florida Complex League	Port St. Lucie, Florida	Clover Park	2013
Rookie	DSL Mets Blue	Dominican Summer League	Boca Chica, Santo Domingo	New York Mets Complex	2010
Rookie	DSL Mets Orange	Dominican Summer League	Boca Chica, Santo Domingo	New York Mets Complex	2010

== Past affiliates ==
=== Key ===
Season	Each year is linked to an article about that particular Mets season.

=== 1962 ===
Minor League Baseball operated with six classes (Triple-A, Double-A, Class A, Class B, Class C, and Class D) from 1961 to 1962.

Season	Triple-A	Double-A	Class A	Class B	Class C	Class D	Ref.
1962	Syracuse Chiefs (Note: In 1962, the Mets shared the Triple-A Syracuse Chiefs with the Washington Senators.)	—	—	—	Santa Barbara Rancheros	Auburn Mets; Quincy Jets; Salisbury Braves	

=== 1963–1989 ===
Prior to the 1963 season, Major League Baseball (MLB) initiated a reorganization of Minor League Baseball that resulted in a reduction from six classes to four (Triple-A, Double-A, Class A, and Rookie) in response to the general decline of the minors throughout the 1950s and early-1960s when leagues and teams folded due to shrinking attendance caused by baseball fans' preference for staying at home to watch MLB games on television. The only change made within the next 27 years was Class A being subdivided for the first time to form Class A Short Season in 1966.

Season	Triple-A	Double-A	Class A	Class A Short Season	Rookie	Ref(s).
1963	Buffalo Bisons	—	Auburn Mets; Quincy Jets; Raleigh Mets; Salinas Mets	—	—	
1964	Buffalo Bisons	Williamsport Mets	Auburn Mets; Salinas Mets	—	CRL Mets	
1965	Buffalo Bisons	Williamsport Mets	Auburn Mets; Greenville Mets	—	Marion Mets	
1966	Jacksonville Suns	Williamsport Mets	Auburn Mets; Greenville Mets	—	Marion Mets	
1967	Jacksonville Suns	Williamsport Mets	Durham Bulls; Winter Haven Mets	Mankato Mets	Marion Mets	
1968	Jacksonville Suns	Memphis Blues	Raleigh-Durham Mets; Visalia Mets	Mankato Mets	Marion Mets	
1969	Tidewater Tides	Memphis Blues	Pompano Beach Mets; Visalia Mets	—	Marion Mets	
1970	Tidewater Tides	Memphis Blues	Pompano Beach Mets; Visalia Mets	—	Marion Mets	
1971	Tidewater Tides	Memphis Blues	Pompano Beach Mets; Visalia Mets	—	Marion Mets	
1972	Tidewater Tides	Memphis Blues	Pompano Beach Mets; Visalia Mets	Batavia Trojans	Marion Mets	
1973	Tidewater Tides	Memphis Blues	Pompano Beach Mets; Visalia Mets	Batavia Trojans	Marion Mets	
1974	Tidewater Tides	Victoria Toros	Anderson Mets; Visalia Mets	Batavia Trojans	Marion Mets	
1975	Tidewater Tides	Jackson Mets	Visalia Mets; Wausau Mets	—	Marion Mets	
1976	Tidewater Tides	Jackson Mets	Lynchburg Mets; Wausau Mets	—	Marion Mets	
1977	Tidewater Tides	Jackson Mets	Lynchburg Mets; Wausau Mets	Little Falls Mets	—	
1978	Tidewater Tides	Jackson Mets	Lynchburg Mets; Wausau Mets	Little Falls Mets	—	
1979	Tidewater Tides	Jackson Mets	Lynchburg Mets	Grays Harbor Loggers; Little Falls Mets	—	
1980	Tidewater Tides	Jackson Mets	Lynchburg Mets	Little Falls Mets	Kingsport Mets	
1981	Tidewater Tides	Jackson Mets	Lynchburg Mets; Shelby Mets	Little Falls Mets	Kingsport Mets	
1982	Tidewater Tides	Jackson Mets	Lynchburg Mets; Shelby Mets	Little Falls Mets	Kingsport Mets	
1983	Tidewater Tides	Jackson Mets	Columbia Mets; Lynchburg Mets	Little Falls Mets	GCL Mets	
1984	Tidewater Tides	Jackson Mets	Columbia Mets; Lynchburg Mets	Little Falls Mets	Kingsport Mets	
1985	Tidewater Tides	Jackson Mets	Columbia Mets; Lynchburg Mets	Little Falls Mets	Kingsport Mets	
1986	Tidewater Tides	Jackson Mets	Columbia Mets; Lynchburg Mets	Little Falls Mets	Kingsport Mets	
1987	Tidewater Tides	Jackson Mets	Columbia Mets; Lynchburg Mets	Little Falls Mets	Kingsport Mets	
1988	Tidewater Tides	Jackson Mets	Columbia Mets; St. Lucie Mets	Little Falls Mets	Kingsport Mets; GCL Mets	
1989	Tidewater Tides	Jackson Mets	Columbia Mets; St. Lucie Mets	Pittsfield Mets	Kingsport Mets; GCL Mets; DSL Mets/Pirates/Cardinals	

=== 1990–2020 ===
Minor League Baseball operated with six classes from 1990 to 2020. In 1990, the Class A level was subdivided for a second time with the creation of Class A-Advanced. The Rookie level consisted of domestic and foreign circuits.

Season	Triple-A	Double-A	Class A-Advanced	Class A	Class A Short Season	Rookie	Foreign Rookie	Ref(s).
1990	Tidewater Tides	Jackson Mets	St. Lucie Mets	Columbia Mets	Pittsfield Mets	Kingsport Mets; GCL Mets	DSL Mets/Royals	
1991	Tidewater Tides	Williamsport Bills	St. Lucie Mets	Columbia Mets	Pittsfield Mets	Kingsport Mets; GCL Mets	DSL Mets/Yankees	
1992	Tidewater Tides	Binghamton Mets	St. Lucie Mets	Columbia Mets	Pittsfield Mets	Kingsport Mets; GCL Mets	DSL Mets	
1993	Norfolk Tides	Binghamton Mets	St. Lucie Mets	Capital City Bombers	Pittsfield Mets	Kingsport Mets; GCL Mets	DSL Mets	
1994	Norfolk Tides	Binghamton Mets	St. Lucie Mets	Capital City Bombers	Pittsfield Mets	Kingsport Mets; GCL Mets	DSL Mets	
1995	Norfolk Tides	Binghamton Mets	St. Lucie Mets	Capital City Bombers	Pittsfield Mets	Kingsport Mets; GCL Mets	DSL Mets	
1996	Norfolk Tides	Binghamton Mets	St. Lucie Mets	Capital City Bombers	Pittsfield Mets	Kingsport Mets; GCL Mets	DSL Mets	
1997	Norfolk Tides	Binghamton Mets	St. Lucie Mets	Capital City Bombers	Pittsfield Mets	Kingsport Mets; GCL Mets	DSL Mets	
1998	Norfolk Tides	Binghamton Mets	St. Lucie Mets	Capital City Bombers	Pittsfield Mets	Kingsport Mets; GCL Mets	DSL Mets 1 DSL Mets 2	
1999	Norfolk Tides	Binghamton Mets	St. Lucie Mets	Capital City Bombers	Pittsfield Mets	Kingsport Mets; GCL Mets	DSL Mets 1 DSL Mets 2/Co-op	
2000	Norfolk Tides	Binghamton Mets	St. Lucie Mets	Capital City Bombers	Pittsfield Mets	Kingsport Mets	DSL Mets East; DSL Mets West	
2001	Norfolk Tides	Binghamton Mets	St. Lucie Mets	Capital City Bombers	Brooklyn Cyclones	Kingsport Mets	DSL Mets	
2002	Norfolk Tides	Binghamton Mets	St. Lucie Mets	Capital City Bombers	Brooklyn Cyclones	Kingsport Mets	DSL Mets; VSL Universidad de Carabobo	
2003	Norfolk Tides	Binghamton Mets	St. Lucie Mets	Capital City Bombers	Brooklyn Cyclones	Kingsport Mets	DSL Mets; VSL Tronconero 2	
2004	Norfolk Tides	Binghamton Mets	St. Lucie Mets	Capital City Bombers	Brooklyn Cyclones	Kingsport Mets; GCL Mets	DSL Mets; VSL Tronconero 2	
2005	Norfolk Tides	Binghamton Mets	St. Lucie Mets	Hagerstown Suns	Brooklyn Cyclones	Kingsport Mets; GCL Mets	DSL Mets; VSL Mets	
2006	Norfolk Tides	Binghamton Mets	St. Lucie Mets	Hagerstown Suns	Brooklyn Cyclones	Kingsport Mets; GCL Mets	DSL Mets; VSL Mets	
2007	New Orleans Zephyrs	Binghamton Mets	St. Lucie Mets	Savannah Sand Gnats	Brooklyn Cyclones	Kingsport Mets; GCL Mets	DSL Mets; VSL Mets	
2008	New Orleans Zephyrs	Binghamton Mets	St. Lucie Mets	Savannah Sand Gnats	Brooklyn Cyclones	Kingsport Mets; GCL Mets	DSL Mets; VSL Mets	
2009	Buffalo Bisons	Binghamton Mets	St. Lucie Mets	Savannah Sand Gnats	Brooklyn Cyclones	Kingsport Mets; GCL Mets	DSL Mets; VSL Mets	
2010	Buffalo Bisons	Binghamton Mets	St. Lucie Mets	Savannah Sand Gnats	Brooklyn Cyclones	Kingsport Mets; GCL Mets	DSL Mets 1 DSL Mets 2	
2011	Buffalo Bisons	Binghamton Mets	St. Lucie Mets	Savannah Sand Gnats	Brooklyn Cyclones	Kingsport Mets; GCL Mets	DSL Mets 1 DSL Mets 2	
2012	Buffalo Bisons	Binghamton Mets	St. Lucie Mets	Savannah Sand Gnats	Brooklyn Cyclones	Kingsport Mets	DSL Mets 1 DSL Mets 2	
2013	Las Vegas 51s	Binghamton Mets	St. Lucie Mets	Savannah Sand Gnats	Brooklyn Cyclones	Kingsport Mets; GCL Mets	DSL Mets 1 DSL Mets 2	
2014	Las Vegas 51s	Binghamton Mets	St. Lucie Mets	Savannah Sand Gnats	Brooklyn Cyclones	Kingsport Mets; GCL Mets	DSL Mets 1 DSL Mets 2	
2015	Las Vegas 51s	Binghamton Mets	St. Lucie Mets	Savannah Sand Gnats	Brooklyn Cyclones	Kingsport Mets; GCL Mets	DSL Mets 1 DSL Mets 2	
2016	Las Vegas 51s	Binghamton Mets	St. Lucie Mets	Columbia Fireflies	Brooklyn Cyclones	Kingsport Mets; GCL Mets	DSL Mets 1 DSL Mets 2	
2017	Las Vegas 51s	Binghamton Rumble Ponies	St. Lucie Mets	Columbia Fireflies	Brooklyn Cyclones	Kingsport Mets; GCL Mets	DSL Mets 1 DSL Mets 2	
2018	Las Vegas 51s	Binghamton Rumble Ponies	St. Lucie Mets	Columbia Fireflies	Brooklyn Cyclones	Kingsport Mets; GCL Mets	DSL Mets 1 DSL Mets 2	
2019	Syracuse Mets	Binghamton Rumble Ponies	St. Lucie Mets	Columbia Fireflies	Brooklyn Cyclones	Kingsport Mets; GCL Mets	DSL Mets 1 DSL Mets 2	
2020 (Note: The 2020 Minor League Baseball season was cancelled due to the COVID-19 pandemic.)	Syracuse Mets	Binghamton Rumble Ponies	St. Lucie Mets	Columbia Fireflies	Brooklyn Cyclones	Kingsport Mets; GCL Mets	DSL Mets 1 DSL Mets 2	

=== 2021–present ===
The current structure of Minor League Baseball is the result of an overall contraction of the system beginning with the 2021 season. Class A was reduced to two levels: High-A and Low-A. Low-A was reclassified as Single-A in 2022.

Season	Triple-A	Double-A	High-A	Single-A	Rookie	Foreign Rookie	Ref.
2021	Syracuse Mets	Binghamton Rumble Ponies	Brooklyn Cyclones	St. Lucie Mets	FCL Mets	DSL Mets 1 DSL Mets 2	
2022	Syracuse Mets	Binghamton Rumble Ponies	Brooklyn Cyclones	St. Lucie Mets	FCL Mets	DSL Mets 1 DSL Mets 2	
2023	Syracuse Mets	Binghamton Rumble Ponies	Brooklyn Cyclones	St. Lucie Mets	FCL Mets	DSL Mets Blue; DSL Mets Orange	
2024	Syracuse Mets	Binghamton Rumble Ponies	Brooklyn Cyclones	St. Lucie Mets	FCL Mets	DSL Mets Blue; DSL Mets Orange	
2025	Syracuse Mets	Binghamton Rumble Ponies	Brooklyn Cyclones	St. Lucie Mets	FCL Mets	DSL Mets Blue; DSL Mets Orange	
2026	Syracuse Mets	Binghamton Rumble Ponies	Brooklyn Cyclones	St. Lucie Mets	FCL Mets	DSL Mets Blue; DSL Mets Orange	
