= Mississippi Valley League =

- Classification: Class D (1922–1932); Class B (1933)
- Sport: Minor League Baseball
- Founder: Michael H. Sexton
- First season: 1922; 104 years ago
- Folded: 1933; 93 years ago
- President: Michael H. Sexton (1922–1924); Belden Hill (1925–1926); Michael H. Sexton (1927; Belden Hill (1928–1931); Charles A. Logan (1932–1933)
- No. of teams: 13
- Country: United States of America
- Most titles: 3 Cedar Rapids Bunnies (1922, 1925, 1930); Dubuque Dubs (1923, 1927, 1929)
- Related competitions: Illinois-Indiana-Iowa League; Midwest League
- Website: https://www.milb.com/midwest

The Mississippi Valley League (MVL) was a baseball Class D level minor league that operated from 1922 through 1933. Playing its last year as a Class B level league, the league franchises were based in Iowa and Illinois. Like many leagues at the time, the Great Depression led to its demise. The Mississippi Valley League was founded by Michael H. Sexton, of Rock Island, Illinois, who was then president of the National Association of Professional Baseball Leagues.

== History ==
The league began play in 1922 with six teams: the Cedar Rapids Bunnies, Marshalltown Ansons, Rock Island Islanders, Waterloo Hawks, Ottumwa Cardinals and the Dubuque Climbers. There were no formal playoffs, and the Bunnies finished in first place. All teams from 1922 returned for 1923 with the Climbers finishing first in the league. Again, there were no formal playoffs.

In 1924, the league expanded to eight teams, adding the Moline Plowboys and Burlington Bees. The Dubuque Climbers became the Dubuque Dubs, though the other teams remained the same. The Hawks finished first in the league.

All teams from 1924 returned for 1925, with the Dubs becoming the Dubuque Ironmen. The Bunnies finished first in the league for the second time four years. In 1926, the Ottumwa Cardinals became the Ottumwa Packers and the Dubuque Dubs became the Dubuque Speasmen, named after their manager Bill Speas. The Packers finished in first place.

In 1927, the Speasmen returned to their former name the Dubuque Dubs. All other teams returned intact from the year before. Dubuque finished first in the league. The same teams played in 1928, with the Hawks finishing in first place. 1929 saw multiple league changes. The Dubs became the Dubuque Tigers. The Marshalltown Ansons and Ottumwa Packers left the league and were replaced by the Keokuk Indians and Davenport Blue Sox. The Tigers finished first in the league.

All teams from 1929 returned for 1930, with the Bunnies finishing in first place for the third time in league history. The teams remained intact for 1931 as well, with the Keokuk Indians finishing in first place. 1932 featured no new teams, though it did have a new feature - a playoff system. All teams returned from 1931, and the Blue Sox finishing in first place. They however lost in the league playoffs four games to two to the Islanders, so the Islanders were the league champions.

In 1933, the league featured only six teams for the first time since 1923. It also moved up in rank from Class-D to Class-B, and saw three new arrivals (Peoria Tractors, Quincy Indians, Springfield Senators) as well as multiple departures (Burlington Bees, Cedar Rapids Bunnies, Moline Plowboys, Waterloo Hawks, Dubuque Tigers). The Blue Sox finished in first place and defeated the Islanders four games to one in the playoffs to become league champions.

The 1933 Davenport Blue Sox are ranked #58 in the All-time Top 100 teams by MiLB.com. The Blue Sox finished the season 82-32, as Como Cotelle hit .407 and Ed Hall drove in 151 runs.

The Rock Island Islanders were the only team to play in the league through its entire 12-year existence.

== Cities represented: 1922–1933 ==
- Burlington, IA: Burlington Bees (1924–1932)
- Cedar Rapids, IA: Cedar Rapids Bunnies (1922–1932)
- Davenport, IA: Davenport Blue Sox (1929–1933)
- Dubuque, IA: Dubuque Climbers (1922–1923); Dubuque Dubs (1924); Dubuque Ironmen (1925); Dubuque Speasmen (1926); Dubuque Dubs (1927–1928); Dubuque Tigers (1929–1932)
- Keokuk, IA: Keokuk Indians (1929–1933)
- Marshalltown, IA: Marshalltown Ansons (1922–1928)
- Moline, IL: Moline Plowboys (1924–1932)
- Ottumwa, IA: Ottumwa Cardinals (1922–1925); Ottumwa Packers (1926–1928)
- Peoria, IL: Peoria Tractors (1933)
- Quincy, IL: Quincy Indians (1933)
- Rock Island, IL: Rock Island Islanders (1922–1933)
- Springfield, IL: Springfield Senators (1933)
- Waterloo, IA: Waterloo Hawks (1922–1932)

== Mississippi Valley League standings and statistics ==
=== 1922 to 1927 ===
1922 Mississippi Valley League
schedule

Team standings	W	L	PCT	GB	Managers
Cedar Rapids Bunnies	92	37	.713	--	Bill Speas
Marshalltown Ansons	73	55	.570	18½	Frank Boyle
Rock Island Islanders	66	63	.512	26	Jimmy Conzelman
Waterloo Hawks	59	68	.465	32	Pat Ragan
Ottumwa Cardinals	49	76	.392	41	Jim Drohan / Carl Bond
Dubuque Climbers	44	84	.344	47½	Larry Mullen / Harry Henge / Joe McGinnity

Player statistics
Player	Team	Stat	Tot	Player	Team	Stat	Tot
Fred Leach	Waterloo	BA	.383	Frank Johnson	Cedar Rap	W	24
Bill Speas	Cedar Rapids	Runs	128	Charles Schwiete	Marshall	SO	180
Bill Speas	Cedar Rapids	Hits	182	Frank Johnson	Cedar Rap	Pct	.828; 24-5
Fred Leach	Waterloo	HR	13				

1923 Mississippi Valley League
schedule

Team standings	W	L	PCT	GB	Managers
Dubuque Climbers	78	50	.609	--	Joe McGinnity
Ottumwa Cardinals	73	53	.579	4	Wally Mattick
Cedar Rapids Bunnies	69	56	.552	7½	Bill Speas
Waterloo Hawks	58	69	.457	19½	Bert Weeden
Rock Island Islanders	53	73	.421	24	Tommy Thompson
Marshalltown Ansons	48	78	.381	29	Frank Boyle

Playoffs: None held

Player statistics
Player	Team	Stat	Tot	Player	Team	Stat	Tot
Bill Speas	Cedar Rapids	BA	.363	John Dill	Ottumwa	W	22
John Armstrong	Dubuque	Runs	93	George Brown	Waterloo	SO	175
Bill Speas	Cedar Rapids	Hits	182	Emil Levson	Cedar Rapids	Pct	.826; 19-4
Andrew McEwan	Waterloo	HR	8	J. Johnson	Cedar Rapids	IP	317

1924 Mississippi Valley League
schedule

Team standings	W	L	PCT	GB	Managers
Waterloo Hawks	84	40	.678	--	Cletus Dixon
Dubuque Dubs	70	51	.579	12½	John Armstrong
Rock Island Islanders	64	57	.529	18½	Preston Gray
Ottumwa Cardinals	58	61	.487	23½	Wally Mattick
Moline Plowboys	59	65	.478	25	Jim Shollenberger
Burlington Bees	54	67	.446	28½	Henry Wingfield
Cedar Rapids Bunnies	54	67	.446	28½	Bill Speas
Marshalltown Ansons	43	78	.355	39½	Jack Lacey / Frank Boyle

Playoffs: None held

Player statistics
Player	Team	Stat	Tot	Player	Team	Stat	Tot
Fred Schulte	Waterloo	BA	.368	Ovid McCracken	Waterloo	W	23
Hal Anderson	Ottumwa	Runs	126	Richard Didier	Ottumwa	SO	145
Fred Schulte	Waterloo	Hits	167	Claude Willoughby	Waterloo	Pct	.750; 21-7
Fred Schulte	Waterloo	3B	25				
Stan Keyes	Rock Island	HR	20				

1925 Mississippi Valley League
schedule

Team standings	W	L	PCT	GB	Attend	Managers
Cedar Rapids Bunnies	74	51	.592	--	43,429	Bill Speas
Moline Plowboys	73	52	.584	1	39,738	Jim Schollenberger
Rock Island Islanders	65	60	.520	9	43,157	Preston Gray
Ottumwa Cardinals	61	64	.488	13	30,572	Wally Mattick
Dubuque Ironmen	60	65	.480	14	46,175	Joe McGinnity / John Armstrong
Waterloo Hawks	59	66	.472	15	54,702	Cletus Dixon
Marshalltown Ansons	55	70	.440	19	30,442	Frank Boyle
Burlington Bees	53	72	.424	22	42,179	Dick Speer / Whitey Mann / Ed Reichle

Playoffs: None held

Player statistics
Player	Team	Stat	Tot	Player	Team	Stat	Tot
Al Groski	Ottumwa	BA	.360	George Valentine	Cedar Rapids	W	26
John Armstrong	Dubuque	Runs	104	Archie Kelsey	Waterloo	SO	174
Ed Farber	Rock Island	Hits	174	George Valentine	Cedar Rapids	Pct	.765; 26-8
Chester Guppy	Moline	HR	17				
Ed Farber	Rock Island	2B	52				

1926 Mississippi Valley League
schedule

Team standings	W	L	PCT	GB	Managers
Ottumwa Packers	75	45	.625	--	Pat Harkins
Moline Plowboys	71	50	.587	4½	Jim Shollenberger
Waterloo Hawks	67	52	.563	7½	Cletus Dixon
Burlington Bees	68	53	.562	7½	Ed Reichle
Rock Island Islanders	65	55	.542	10	Preston Gray
Dubuque Speasmen	56	63	.471	18½	Bill Speas
Marshalltown Ansons	41	79	.342	34	Elmer Lane / Casey Coffin / Dick Brannigan / Dan O'Leary
Cedar Rapids Bunnies	38	84	.311	38	Fred Beck / Jack Lacy / Dutch White

Playoffs: None held

Player statistics
Player	Team	Stat	Tot	Player	Team	Stat	Tot
Red Worthington	Waterloo	BA	.389	Alvin Bauer	Ottumwa	W	25
Les Smith	Ottumwa	Runs	99	Robert Shanklin	Rock Island	SO	188
Red Worthington	Waterloo	Hits	185	Alvin Bauer	Ottumwa	Pct	.862; 25-4
Les Smith	Ottumwa	HR	20				
Nick Conrad	Marshalltown	SAC	36				

1927 Mississippi Valley League
schedule

Team standings	W	L	PCT	GB	Managers
Dubuque Dubs	66	41	.617	--	Bill Speas
Waterloo Hawks	75	47	.615	½	Cletus Dixon
Burlington Bees	71	52	.577	4½	Ed Reichle
Marshalltown Ansons	65	54	.546	8½	Jim Shollenberger
Moline Plowboys	63	55	.534	10	Fritz Mollwitz
Cedar Rapids Bunnies	50	70	.417	24	Pete Hughes/ Spoke Emery
Rock Island Islanders	40	75	.348	31½	Joe Kernan
Ottumwa Packers	41	77	.347	32	Pat Harkins

Playoffs: None held

Player statistics
Player	Team	Stat	Tot	Player	Team	Stat	Tot
Jim Stroner	Rock Island	BA	.380	Duncan Grant	Waterloo	W	22
James Worth	Dubuque	Runs	127	Harold McKain	Waterloo	SO	147
James Worth	Dubuque	Hits	171	Duncan Grant	Waterloo	SO	147
Len Koenecke	Moline	HR	20	Elbert Fisch	Dubuque	Pct	.800; 20-5

=== 1928 to 1933 ===
1928 Mississippi Valley League
schedule

Team standings	W	L	PCT	GB	Managers
Waterloo Hawks	81	41	.664	--	Cletus Dixon
Moline Plowboys	69	54	.561	12½	Richard Manchester
Rock Island Islanders	67	59	.532	16	Lester Patterson
Dubuque Dubs	63	60	.512	18½	Bill Speas / John Armstrong
Burlington Bees	59	61	.492	21	Ed Reichle
Marshalltown Ansons	58	65	.472	22½	Jim Shollenberger / George Tomer / Ben Diamond
Ottumwa Packers	48	72	.400	32	Preston Gray / Bill Speas
Cedar Rapids Bunnies	45	78	.366	36½	Spoke Emery / Bob Hasbrook

Playoffs: None held

Player Statistics
Player	Team	Stat	Tot	Player	Team	Stat	Tot
Len Koenecke	Moline	BA	.389	Duncan Grant	Waterloo	W	21
Walter Genin	Rock Island	Runs	115	Ray Wolf	Moline	W	21
Len Koenecke	Moline	Hits	182	Bob Weiland	Moline	SO	209
Len Koenecke	Moline	HR	22	Duncan Grant	Waterloo	Pct	.808; 21-5

1929 Mississippi Valley League
schedule

Team standings	W	L	PCT	GB	Managers
Dubuque Tigers	75	51	.595	--	Lester Patterson
Waterloo Hawks	72	54	.571	3	Cletus Dixon
Davenport Blue Sox	69	57	.548	6	Ed Reichle
Moline Plowboys	63	63	.500	12	Richard Manchester
Burlington Bees	62	64	.492	13	George Young
Keokuk Indians	60	65	.480	14½	Ben Diamond
Cedar Rapids Bunnies	58	67	.464	16½	Bill Speas / Tibb Serre
Rock Island Islanders	44	82	.349	31	Walt Genin / Buck Wheat

Playoffs: None held

Player statistics
Player	Team	Stat	Tot	Player	Team	Stat	Tot
Spot Grant	Cedar Rapids	BA	.368	Albert Eckert	Dubuque	W	19
Paul Speraw	Dubuque	Runs	112	H.H. Miller	Cedar Rapids	W	19
Ed Hendee	Davenport	Hits	183	Fred Witte	Davenport	W	19
Ken Storm	Waterloo	HR	23	Lester Neisslie	Moline	SO	141
Jack Frost	Waterloo	AB	547	Johnny Niggeling	Waterloo	Pct	.789;15-4

1930 Mississippi Valley League
schedule

Team standings	W	L	PCT	GB	Managers
Cedar Rapids Bunnies	71	55	.564	--	Paul Speraw
Rock Island Islanders	70	56	.556	1	Clarence Roper
Davenport Blue Sox	64	61	.512	6½	Ed Reichle
Moline Plowboys	63	62	.504	7½	Riley Parker
Waterloo Hawks	63	63	.500	8	Cletus Dixon
Burlington Bees	61	65	.484	10	George Young
Keokuk Indians	56	70	.445	15	Sam Schwartz / Lester Patterson / Henry Wingfield / John Schinski
Dubuque Tigers	55	71	.437	16	Richard Manchester / Ed Woerber

Playoffs: None held

Player statistics
Player	Team	Stat	Tot	Player	Team	Stat	Tot
Riley Parker	Moline	BA	.376	Delano Wetherell	Rock Island	W	21
Dick Esrey	Moline	Runs	114	Delano Wetherell	Rock Island	So	217
Dick Esrey	Moline	Hits	183	Walter Murphy	Rock Island	Pct	.667; 10-5
Joe Prerost	Waterloo	HR	15				
John Kerr	Cedar Rapids	SB	84				

1931 Mississippi Valley League
schedule

Team standings	W	L	PCT	GB	Managers
Keokuk Indians	73	51	.589	--	Bob Rice
Cedar Rapids Bunnies	74	52	.587	½	Paul Speraw
Moline Plowboys	68	58	.540	6	Riley Parker
Burlington Bees	64	60	.516	9	Art Mueller
Rock Island Islanders	61	65	.484	13	Clarence Roper
Waterloo Hawks	57	68	.456	16½	Dick Manchester / Babe Thomas
Davenport Blue Sox	53	73	.421	21	Ed Reichle / Cletus Dixon
Dubuque Tigers	51	74	.408	22½	Preston Gray / Ed Hendee / Elmer Peters

Playoffs: None held

Player statistics
Player	Team	Stat	Tot	Player	Team	Stat	Tot
Riley Parker	Moline	BA	.374	Gil Paulsen	Burlington	W	19
Pep Young	Keokuk	Runs	125	John Ziegler	Cedar Rapids	W	19
Dick Esrey	Moline	Hits	176	Al Gizelbach	Burlington	SO	185
Malcolm Pickett	Moline	HR	13	Gil Paulsen	Burlington	ERA	2.21
				Fred Newton	Rock Island	PCT	.750 12-4

1932 Mississippi Valley League
schedule

Team standings	W	L	PCT	GB	Managers
Davenport Blue Sox	78	47	.624	--	Cletus Dixon
Rock Island Islanders	70	56	.556	8½	George Young / Riley Parker
Burlington Bees	69	60	.535	11	Art Mueller / Jack Tesar
Keokuk Indians	67	61	.523	12½	Bob Rice
Cedar Rapids Bunnies	65	60	.520	13	Paul Speraw
Moline Plowboys	55	66	.455	21	Ernie Lorbeer
Waterloo Hawks	52	73	.416	26	Doc Bennett
Dubuque Tigers	47	80	.370	32	Clarence Roper / Dave Lamb

Playoffs: Rock Island 4 games, Davenport 2.

Player statistics
Player	Team	Stat	Tot	Player	Team	Stat	Tot
Brown Braley	Keokuk	BA	.374	Fred Newton	Davenport	W	20
Harold Patchett	Moline	Runs	90	Ed Linke	Davenport	SO	228
Thomas Leonard	Rock Island	Hits	163	Fred Newton	Davenport	Pct	.800; 20-5
Lawrence Wilbanks	Moline	HR	9				
William Mizeur	Cedar Rapids	RBI	86				

1933 Mississippi Valley League
schedule

Team standings	W	L	PCT	GB	Managers
Davenport Blue Sox	82	32	.719	-	Cletus Dixon
Rock Island Islanders	64	53	.547	19½	Riley Parker
Peoria Tractors	62	53	.539	20½	Paul Speraw / Frank Murphy
Quincy Indians	53	59	.473	28	Joe Klugmann
Springfield Senators	43	70	.381	38½	Clay Hopper
Keokuk Indians	40	77	.342	43½	Ed Sicking / Ray Caldwell

Playoffs: Davenport 4 games, Rock Island 1

Player statistics
Player	Team	Stat	Tot	Player	Team	Stat	Tot
Como Cotelle	Davenport	BA	.407	Al Piechota	Davenport	W	19
George Meyer	Davenport	Runs	130	Ray Harrell	Quincy	SO	193
Simon Rosenthal	Quincy	Hits	166	Al Hollingsworth	Rock Island	ERA	3.11
Ed Hall	Davenport	HR	28	Torsten Lengquist	Davenport	PCT	.833 10-2
Ed Hall	Davenport	RBI	151				
