= Michael H. Sexton =

American baseball executive

- Born: October 16, 1863; Rock Island, Illinois, U.S.
- Died: January 18, 1937 (aged 73); Rock Island, Illinois, U.S.
- Occupations: Minor League Baseball executive * National Association of Professional Baseball Leagues president (1909–1931) * Three-I League president (1901–1904; 1909) * Western League president (1902–1904) * Mississippi Valley League (1922–1924) president
- Years active: 1901–1931

Michael Henry Sexton (October 16, 1863 – January 18, 1937) was an American baseball executive, whose most significant role was as president of the National Association of Professional Baseball Leagues from 1910 through 1932.

== Early life, police career ==
Born in Rock Island, Illinois, on October 16, 1863, Sexton served as police chief in his hometown from 1893 to 1895.

== Baseball ==
=== Local organizer ===
Sexton later became a partner in the Rock Island Steam Laundry and Towel Supply Company located downtown, where he was known affectionately as "Mr. Baseball" for his passion for the sport and his efforts to establish organized local baseball clubs. Sexton served as president of the Three-I League from 1901 to 1904, and returned in 1909. Sexton also was the president of the Western League from 1902 to 1904, and later became the founder of a restarted Mississippi Valley League in 1922, serving as its president from 1922 to 1924, and again in 1927.

=== President of the NAPBL ===
At the Winter Meetings in 1909, Sexton was chosen to replace Patrick T. Powers as president of the NAPBL, a position Sexton held for 24 years, while collaborating to establish the system during his lengthy term.

Powers and his successor Sexton have been considered the fathers of Minor League Baseball, as they thought alike and acted alike, and were in agreement on the path that the NAPBL should take. Powers remained as president of the Eastern League, which would become the International League.

=== Stand against the Federal League ===
But there were more conflicts ahead for Sexton to confront. The first occurred in 1914, when the outlaw Federal League challenged the established National and American Leagues by raiding their rosters and territories in an effort to become a third Major League circuit. As expected, the incursion took their toll on the top Minor Leagues, as the Federal League also raided top NAPBL teams. Then some radical delegates at the Winter Meetings in 1914 tried to push the NAPBL to desert organized baseball and align with the Federal League. In a clever tactical move, Sexton led the group to take a stand, and passed a strong resolution backing the existing NAPBL agreements with the National and American Leagues. It was a critical time in his presidency, and established his firm command of the organization, leading to an unprecedented five-year contract a year later. The Federal League folded in 1916, but by then there was another conflict facing Sexton and the organization.

=== First World War, conflict with Major League Baseball ===
In 1917, ballplayers along with other large segments of the population served in World War I. It put a tremendous strain on Sexton and the NAPBL, as the season of this year opened with 21 leagues, but 10 of them were no longer active by the month of July. Things got worse in 1918, when just 10 leagues opened the season and the International League was the only one to finish. The others NAPBL members closed down early.

When peace returned after the war, many leagues began to re-emerge, but Sexton and the NAPBL had yet another battle to fight. At the Winter Meetings in 1919, members voted to abort the National Agreement subscribed with Major League Baseball over issues related to territorial rights, player limits and salary structure, among others.

By then, Major League Baseball had been governed by a three-man National Commission, consisting of American League President Ban Johnson, National League President John Heydler and Cincinnati Reds owner Garry Herrmann. In January 1920, Herrmann left office at the request of other club owners, leaving the Commission effectively deadlocked between Johnson and Heydler. A number of club owners, disliking one or both league presidents, preferred a single commissioner to rule over the game. The appointment in 1920 of Judge Kenesaw Mountain Landis as baseball's first commissioner has been described as the turning point for Major League Baseball, but it had a profound impact on the NAPBL, as well. By January 1921, Judge Landis had the two sides back together with a new National Agreement, and the NAPBL were on their way to a period of peace, growth and prosperity throughout the 1920s. The organization completed its 25th season in 1926 as a sound, stable, well-organized group with 28 leagues and nearly 200 clubs.

=== Great Depression, resignation ===
But the peace remained until the historical Wall Street crash of 1929, because only 25 NAPBL circuits were able to finish the regular season that year. That number dwindled to 21 in 1930 and 16 in 1932. From there, the administrative duties were put in the hands of an executive committee for a period of one year, with orders to survey conditions and report back with recommendations and specific requests for changes. The committee established a promotional department to organize new leagues and new business, including the advocacy of night baseball, and it created a press bureau to organize records and promote the game. Sexton then realized that he had served his time, and agreed to retire at the Winter Meetings in 1932. Sexton resigned to a position that he held for 24 years, the longest tenure of any Minor League president to this day. Judge William G. Bramham was elected as his replacement.

== Death ==
Michael Sexton died in 1937 at his home in Rock Island, Illinois at the age of 73. His death was caused by a myocardial infarction while he was recovering from influenza.
