= QU Stadium =

Stadium in Illinois, US

- "The Rock Pile", "The Rock"
- Location within Illinois Location within the United States
- Interactive map of QU Stadium
- Former names: Q Stadium (1938–1983); QC Stadium (1984–1993)
- Location: 1800 Sycamore Street; Quincy, Illinois 62301; United States
- Coordinates: 39.947517°N 91.386253°W
- Owner: Quincy University
- Operator: Quincy University
- Capacity: 2,000 (baseball); 1,600 (football/lacrosse)
- Surface: Shaw Sports Turf synthetic surface
- Field size: Left Field Line: 325 ft. Left Center Field: 355 ft. Center Field: 410 ft. Right Center Field: 345 ft. Right Field Line: 295 ft.
- Public transit: Quincy Transit Lines

Construction
- Opened: 1938
- Renovated: 2014

Tenants
- Baseball; Quincy Gems (IIIL) 1946–1956; Quincy Giants (MWL) 1960–1961; Quincy Jets (MWL) 1962–1963; Quincy Gems (MWL) 1964; Quincy Cubs (MWL) 1965–1973; Quincy Rivermen (CICL) 1974–1987; Quincy Hawks baseball (NCAA/NAIA) 1984–present Quincy Gems (CICL/PL) 1996–2023; Hannibal Hoots (PL) 2019; Quincy Doggy Paddlers (PL) 2025–present Football; Quincy Senior High School –1979; Quincy Notre Dame High School –1979; Quincy Hawks football (NCAA/NAIA) 1987–2009, 2014–present Other; Quincy Hawks lacrosse (NCAA) 2019–present Quincy Hawks sprint football (Midwest Sprint Football League) 2022–present

Website
- QU Stadium (Baseball); QU Stadium (Football, Lacrosse)

QU Stadium is a stadium in Quincy, Illinois originally known as Q Stadium. It is primarily used for baseball, but also has a separate football field. The baseball side of QU Stadium holds 2,000 people and the football/lacrosse side of holds 1,600 people. The football side of the stadium (located beyond the right and right center field fence of the baseball field) only has bleachers on one side of the field. The stadium is surrounded by its original limestone wall built in 1938.

== History ==
The stadium was built in 1938 as part of the Works Progress Administration (WPA) and originally owned by the City of Quincy. It is constructed of large limestone blocks and concrete. A "sister" facility of limestone and concrete was built near Quincy High School (which was then located at 13th & Maine). This sister facility was the practice field for Quincy High School athletic teams until a new high school was built at 30th & Maine. At that time, the building at 13th & Maine became Quincy Junior High School and the athletic fields continued to be used by QJHS athletic teams.

In 1984, the city sold the stadium to Quincy College (later Quincy University), a local liberal-arts 4-year Roman Catholic college affiliated with the Order of Friars Minor (Franciscans). The name of the stadium was changed to QC stadium and then to QU stadium, after Quincy College changed its name to Quincy University.

In 2014 a major renovation to the facility began including new turf for the football field and for the baseball infield.

In 2019 the university added Men's and Women's Lacrosse as its 18th and 19th varsity sports, both calling QU Stadium home.

In 2021 it was announced that sprint football, a variant of American football played under standard college rules but with a player weight limit of 178 lb (80.7 kg), would be launched and played at QU Stadium. QU is one of six charter members of the Midwest Sprint Football League.

=== Baseball history ===
The stadium has been home to the Quincy Gems of the Three-I League from 1946 to 1956. On August 3, 1947, it hosted a Negro League game between the Chicago American Giants and New York Black Yankees. From 1960 to 1961 the Quincy Giants of the Midwest League (ML) played there. During the 1962 and 1963 seasons the Quincy Jets of the Midwest League, a New York Mets farm team, played their home games at the stadium and in 1964 another Quincy Gems team played at the stadium. From 1965 to 1973, the Quincy Cubs, a Chicago Cubs farm team, also of the Midwest League called Q Stadium home. The Quincy Rivermen of the Central Illinois Collegiate League (CICL) played at the stadium from 1974 to 1987. Since 1984, it has been the home of the Quincy University Hawks baseball team, while the Quincy Gems of both the CICL and Prospect League have played at the stadium since 1996. The Gems departed after the 2023 season for Hendersonville, Tennessee and will be replaced by a new expansion team that will start play in 2025

=== Football history ===
The stadium was originally used for football by Quincy Senior High School and Quincy Notre Dame High School as their home football field until a new stadium was completed in 1980 (Flinn Stadium). Both schools, as well as Quincy College (later Quincy University), used the baseball side of the stadium for football.

After both high schools quit using the stadium for football, the Quincy YMCA Tackle Football League began using the football side for the 7th & 8th grade league. The YMCA also used the field for two youth flag football leagues – a 2nd through 4th grade league, and a 5th & 6th grade league. The Quincy Family YMCA completed a field on its property, so the tackle football and flag football leagues moved to that field in 1984.

In 1987, then Quincy College re-instated its football program after an over 30-year hiatus. The Hawks began using the football side of QC Stadium competing in NCAA Division III. The Hawks moved up to NCAA Division II during the 1990s. In 2010, the football team moved to Flinn Stadium, but moved back to QU Stadium in 2014 after a major renovation.

== Gallery ==
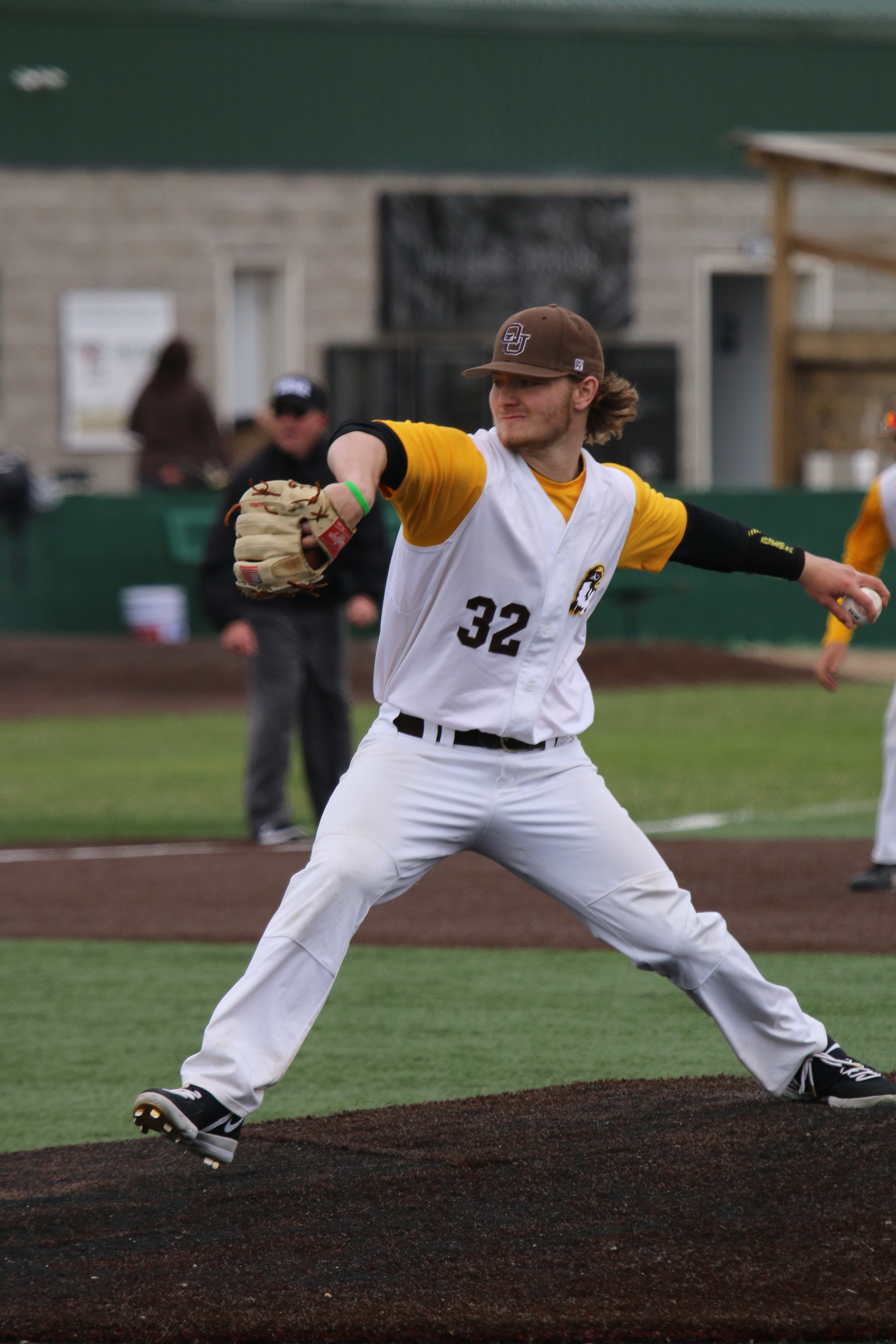
QU Baseball Pitcher

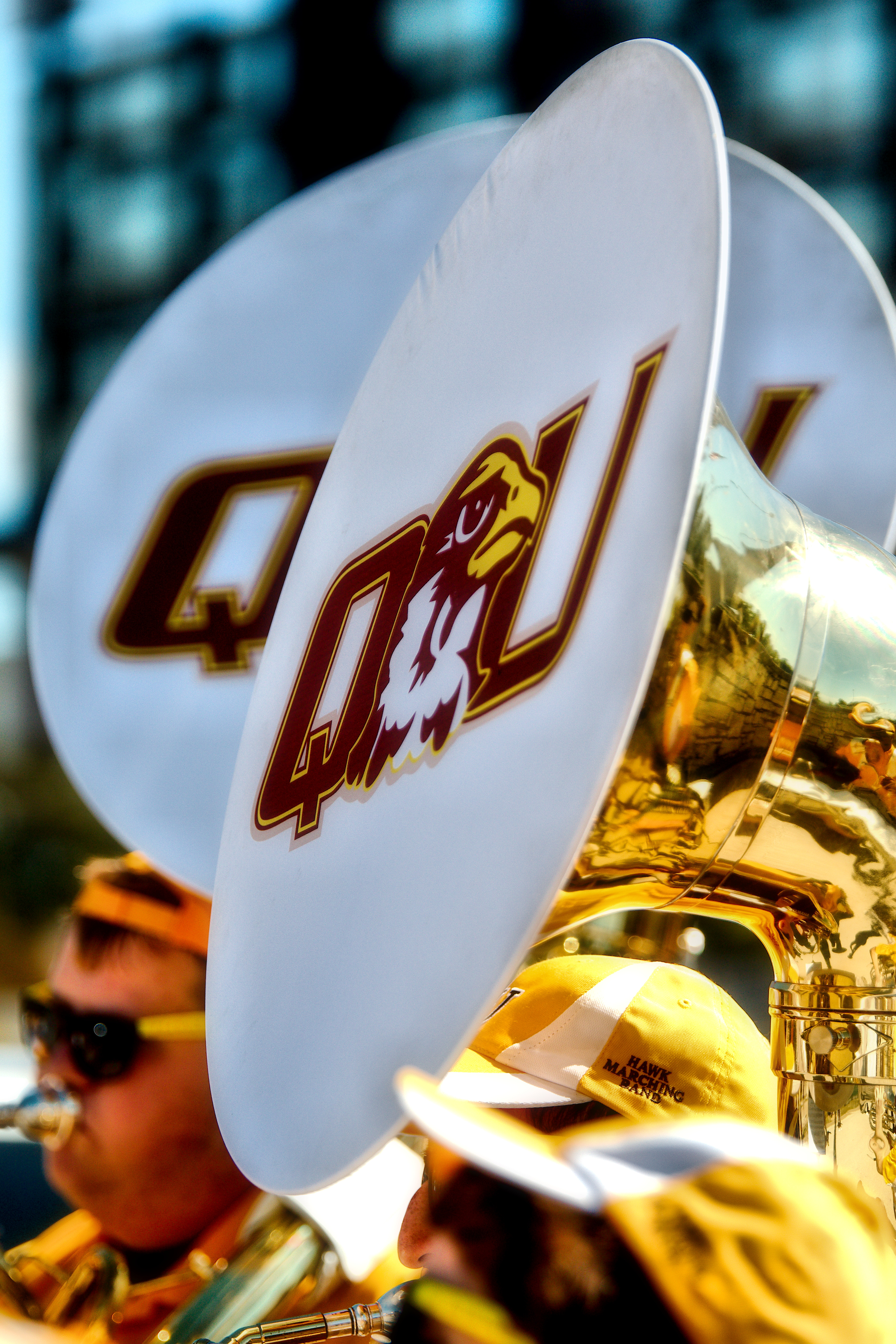
QU Marching Band
