= Sheriff Robinson =

American baseball player and coach

- Coach
- Born: September 8, 1921; Cambridge, Maryland, U.S.
- Died: April 5, 2002 (aged 80); Cambridge, Maryland, U.S.
- Batted: Right Threw: Right
- Stats at Baseball Reference

Teams
- New York Mets (1964, 1965–1967, 1972)

Warren Grant "Sheriff" Robinson (September 8, 1921 – April 5, 2002) was an American catcher and manager in minor league baseball and a coach and scout for the New York Mets of Major League Baseball. A native of Cambridge, Maryland, he earned his nickname from schoolmates after his father, William Lincoln Grant Robinson, twice ran unsuccessfully for the office of sheriff of Dorchester County, which is situated on the Maryland's Eastern Shore.

== Minor league playing and managing career ==
Robinson stood 6 feet 1 inch (1.85 m) tall, weighed 195 pounds (88 kg) and batted and threw right-handed during his playing career. He signed his first professional baseball contract with the St. Louis Cardinals and rose to the highest level of the minor leagues at age 19 with the 1941 Rochester Red Wings of the International League. However, Robinson would never reach the Major Leagues as a player. With the exception of a three-year (1943–45) tour of duty in military service during World War II, he caught in the International League with Rochester and the minor league edition of the Baltimore Orioles through the middle of the 1949 season, when he was acquired by the Boston Red Sox' Louisville Colonels farm club.

The following season, he became a playing coach in Boston's farm system, with the San Jose Red Sox. In 1953, he received his first managerial assignment as skipper of the Bosox' Salisbury Rocots Class D affiliate in the Tar Heel League. Robinson swiftly worked his way upward as a minor league manager in the Boston organization, winning a championship with the Corning Red Sox of the Pennsylvania–Ontario–New York League (PONY League) in 1954 and 98 games for the second-place San Jose club in the 1955 California League.

In 1957–58, Robinson managed Double-A clubs for Boston in the Texas League (with the Oklahoma City Indians) and the Southern Association (with the Memphis Chicks). However, a housecleaning in the Red Sox front office at the close of the 1960 season resulted in the departure of the team's farm system director, Johnny Murphy, and Robinson joined the New York Yankees for two seasons, managing the Amarillo Gold Sox to the 1961 Texas League pennant and helming the Triple-A Richmond Virginians in 1962.

== Career with New York Mets ==
He joined the Mets in 1963, their sophomore season, reunited with Murphy, who was a vice president in the club's front office. His first post was as the skipper of the Quincy Jets of the Class A Midwest League.

In 1964, Robinson was called up to the Mets for the first of three different terms as a Major League coach. That season, he served as bullpen coach under Casey Stengel. After spending a half-season as manager of the Mets' Buffalo Bisons Triple-A farm club in 1965, he returned to New York in midyear to work as the bullpen coach for the Mets' new manager, Wes Westrum, serving through 1967.

Robinson would spend the next decade as a scout for the Mets, except for the 1972 season. That April, he was appointed the Mets' first-base coach to fill the vacancy on the coaching staff left by Yogi Berra's promotion to manager following the sudden death of Gil Hodges.

Sheriff Robinson died in Cambridge, aged 80, in 2002. His record as a minor league manager, over 12 seasons, was 786–821 (.489).

Sporting positions
Preceded by Jodie Beeler	Oklahoma City Indians manager 1957	Succeeded by Club disbanded
Preceded by Lou Klein	Memphis Chickasaws manager 1958	Succeeded by Luke Appling
Preceded by Jim Gleeson	Amarillo Gold Sox manager 1961	Succeeded by Rube Walker
Preceded by Cal Ermer	Richmond Virginians manager 1962	Succeeded by Preston Gómez
Preceded by Whitey Kurowski	Buffalo Bisons manager 1965	Succeeded by Kerby Farrell
Preceded by Clyde McCullough; Wes Westrum	New York Mets bullpen coach 1964; 1965–1967	Succeeded by Wes Westrum; Joe Pignatano
Preceded by Yogi Berra	New York Mets first-base coach 1972	Succeeded by Roy McMillan
