= Len Koenecke =

American baseball player (1904-1935)

- Outfielder
- Born: January 18, 1904; Baraboo, Wisconsin, U.S.
- Died: September 17, 1935 (aged 31); Etobicoke, Ontario, Canada
- Batted: Left Threw: Right

MLB debut
- April 12, 1932, for the New York Giants

Last MLB appearance
- September 15, 1935, for the Brooklyn Dodgers

MLB statistics
- Batting average: .297
- Home runs: 22
- Runs batted in: 114
- Stats at Baseball Reference

Teams
- New York Giants (1932); Brooklyn Dodgers (1934–1935)

Leonard George Koenecke (January 18, 1904 – September 17, 1935) was an American professional baseball player who played Major League Baseball for the Brooklyn Dodgers and the New York Giants. He died of a blow to the head mid-flight at the hands of the pilot and a passenger after attempting to take control of an aircraft he had chartered.

== Early life ==
Koenecke was the son of a locomotive engineer and had worked as a fireman for the Chicago & Northwestern Railroad.

== Minor league career ==
Koenecke made his professional debut for the Moline Plowboys in the Mississippi Valley League in 1927.

In 1928 he joined Indianapolis in the American Association.

== Major League career ==
After several seasons with Indianapolis, Koenecke was signed to the New York Giants in December 1931 in a deal worth $75,000. Manager John McGraw predicted he would "be a bright star in the National League". He played just the one season with the Giants. Koenecke made his debut for the Giants, going hitless against the Philadelphia Phillies on April 12, 1932.

In 1933, playing for the International League Buffalo Bisons, he hit .334 and had 100 runs batted in with eight home runs. In 1934, Koenecke joined the Brooklyn Dodgers, where in his first season he hit .320 with 14 home runs, 73 RBIs and set a National League fielding record with a percentage of .994. His second season saw a decline in his onfield performance and he was cut on September 16, 1935, during the middle of a road trip after a game in Chicago.

Just one day later, he would be dead.

== Death ==
The Dodgers were in St. Louis preparing for a series against the Cardinals when Koenecke was informed that his season was over. Koenecke caught an American Airlines flight back to New York City via Chicago and Detroit. During the flight, he drank a quart (946 ml) of whiskey and became very drunk. After Koenecke had harassed other passengers and struck a stewardess, the pilot had to sit on him to restrain him while he was shackled to his seat. He was removed unconscious from the flight in Detroit. After sleeping on a chair in the airport, he chartered a flight to Buffalo in the hopes of rejoining the Bisons. En route, he had a disagreement with the pilot and a passenger, and attempted to take control of the aircraft.

In order to avoid a crash, Koenecke was hit over the head with a fire extinguisher by both the pilot, William Joseph Mulqueeney, who had left his controls, and the other passenger, Irwin Davis. Now lost in Canadian airspace, Mulqueeney made an emergency landing at Long Branch Racetrack in Etobicoke, Ontario, Canada where it was found that Koenecke had died of a cerebral hemorrhage. The two men were charged with manslaughter but were found not liable by a coroner's jury soon after.

He was buried in Mount Repose Cemetery at Friendship, Wisconsin.

== In popular culture ==
Koenecke's death was referenced in season 5, episode 7 of the animated TV series Archer, "Smuggler's Blues".

== See also ==
- List of baseball players who died during their careers
