= John Petrakis Park =

Baseball park in Dubuque, Iowa, United States

John Petrakis Park was a baseball ballpark located in Dubuque, Iowa.

It originally opened in 1915 as Municipal Stadium. It served as the home of the Dubuque Packers minor league baseball team from 1954 to 1976. It was renamed John Petrakis park in 1967.

The park was named for Johnny Petrakis, who was President and General Manager of the minor league franchise. A longtime baseball supporter in Dubuque, Petrakis was a supporter of both youth leagues and minor league baseball. In 1956, Petrakis received major recognition as he was featured in an edition of the Saturday Evening Post. The same year, he also was named "Executive of the Year for minor leagues" by the Sporting News, another national publication. On May 4, 1986, after the demise of the original ballpark, a new field was dedicated and named "John Petrakis Field". The new field is within the Gerald McAleece Park & Recreation Complex in Dubuque."
