= Quincy Cubs =

Minor league baseball team

The Quincy Cubs were a minor league baseball team located in Quincy, Illinois. The team played in the Midwest League, and were an affiliate of the Chicago Cubs. Their home stadium was Q Stadium. The franchise lasted from 1965 to 1973, when the Cubs relocated to Dubuque, Iowa as the Dubuque Packers.
