= Waterloo Hawks (baseball) =

American minor league baseball team

The Waterloo Hawks were an American minor-league professional baseball team based in Waterloo, Iowa, that existed on-and-off from 1922 to 1969. From 1922 to 1932, they played in the Mississippi Valley League and in 1932 they were affiliated with the Chicago White Sox. They played in the Western League in 1936 and from 1940 to 1942 in the Illinois-Iowa-Indiana League, where they were again affiliated with the White Sox. From 1958 to 1969 they played in the Midwest League and were affiliated with the Boston Red Sox (1958–1968) and Kansas City Royals (1969).

In 1936 and from 1940 to 1942, they played their home games at Red Hawk Stadium. From 1958 to 1969, they played their home games at Riverfront Stadium.

== Year-by-year record ==
Year	Record	Finish	Manager	Playoffs
1922	59-68	4th	Pat Ragan	No playoffs held
1923	58-69	4th	Bert Weeden	No playoffs held
1924	84-40	1st	Cletus Dixon	League champions
1925	59-66	6th	Cletus Dixon	No playoffs held
1926	67-52	3rd	Cletus Dixon	No playoffs held
1927	75-47	2nd	Cletus Dixon	No playoffs held
1928	81-41	1st	Cletus Dixon	League champions
1929	72-54	2nd	Cletus Dixon	No playoffs held
1930	63-63	5th	Cletus Dixon	No playoffs held
1931	57-68	6th	Dick Manchester / Babe Thomas	No playoffs held
1932	52-73	7th	Elmer Bennett	No playoffs held
1936	50-79	6th	Ralph Michaels / John Berger	No playoffs held
1940	36-85	8th	John Fitzpatrick / Frederick Bedore	No playoffs held
1941	59-65	5th	Louis Brower / Johnny Mostil	No playoffs held
1942	47-71	5th	Johnny Mostil	No playoffs held
1958	66-55	3rd	Ken Deal	League champions
1959	76-48	1st	Elmer Yoter	League champions
1960	81-43	1st	Matt Sczesny	League champions
1961	75-51	1st	Matt Sczesny / Bill Slack	Lost League Finals
1962	73-50	1st	Matt Sczesny	Lost League Finals
1963	58-66	6th	Len Okrie	No playoffs held
1964	65-61	5th	Matt Sczesny	No playoffs held
1965	63-55	4th	Larry Thomas	No playoffs held
1966	56-68	7th	Dave Philley	No playoffs held
1967	56-65	7th	Rac Slider	No playoffs held
1968	53-60	8th	Rac Slider	No playoffs held
1969	52-72	8th	Rollie Hemsley	No playoffs held

== See also ==
- Waterloo White Hawks
