= Bill Speas =

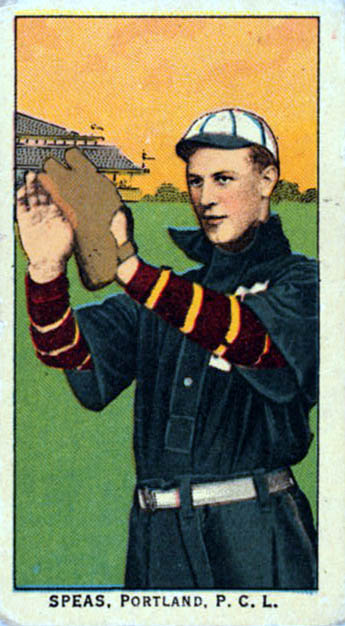
A 1910 baseball card of Speas issued by the American Tobacco Company.

William John Speas, Sr. (August 17, 1887 – January 13, 1969) was a long-time minor league baseball player and manager. He played in the minor leagues for 22 seasons, from 1906 to 1927, and managed at that level from 1918 to 1929.

== Playing career ==
Speas began his professional career as an 18-year-old in 1906, suiting up for the Mansfield Giants of the Ohio–Pennsylvania League. He remained in that league until 1908, moving to the Pacific Coast League for the first time in 1909, playing for the Portland Beavers. Moving to the Northwestern League in 1911, Speas remained there until partway through the 1913 campaign, when he returned to Portland and the PCL, where he remained until 1916. He also spent part of 1916 with the PCL's San Francisco Seals. During the height of his career, Speas was considered one of the best fielders in the Pacific Coast League and was once said to have had the best throwing arm in the league.

He bounced around the Central League, Pacific Coast International League, PCL, Western Canada League and Western League from 1917 to 1921, finally settling down in the Mississippi Valley League, where he remained for the rest of his playing career, until 1927. It was in the Mississippi Valley League that Speas posted the best offensive statistics of his career. From 1921 to 1924, he never hit below .326, and in 1922 and 1923, he hit .382 and .363, respectively. He finished second in the league in batting average in 1922 (trailing Freddy Leach by only a single point) and he led the league in 1923. He led the Western Canada League with a .350 batting average in 1921, as well.

Speas finished his career with a .284 batting average. He had 2,490 hits in 2,430 games.

== Managerial career ==
Speas managed the Tacoma Tigers (1918), Regina Senators (1919–1921), Cedar Rapids Bunnies (1922–1925, 1929), Dubuque Speasmen (named after Speas, 1926), Dubuque Dubs (1927–1928) and Ottumwa Packers (1928).

In 1922 and 1925, he led the Cedar Rapids Bunnies to first-place finishes in the Mississippi Valley League. Since no postseason was played in either year, they were de facto league champions. A similar situation unfolded in 1927, when he led the Dubuque Dubs to a first-place finish in the Mississippi Valley League.

== Personal life ==
Speas was born in Toledo, Ohio on August 17, 1887, to Fred W. and Minnie (Eble) Speas. His son, William Speas, played in the minor leagues in the 1930s and 1940s. He died on January 13, 1969, with a last known residence in Tyler, Texas.
