= Keokuk Westerns =

Defunct American baseball team

- Western Baseball Club

Information
- League: National Association of Professional Base Ball Players
- Location: Keokuk, Iowa
- Ballpark: Perry Park
- Founded: 1875
- Folded: 1875
- Last season: 1-12
- Manager: Joe Simmons

The Western baseball club of Keokuk, Iowa, or Keokuk Westerns in modern nomenclature, was a professional baseball team in the National Association in 1875, the last season of that first professional league. It is considered a major league team by those who count the NA as a major league. It was geographically the furthest west major league baseball had progressed up to that time.

== Team History ==
=== Baseball in Keokuk before 1875 ===
Baseball gained prominence in Iowa after the Civil War. Keokuk had three local baseball teams in 1867: the Pioneers, the Gate Citys, and the Athletics. The city was not always included in state-wide tournaments in the 1860s and 1870s, in part because incomplete railroads left Keokuk disconnected from some tournament sites. Despite this, it was Keokuk that managed to get the first Iowan team into a (debatably) major league, enrolling the Keokuk club the Westerns in the 1875 season of the National Association.

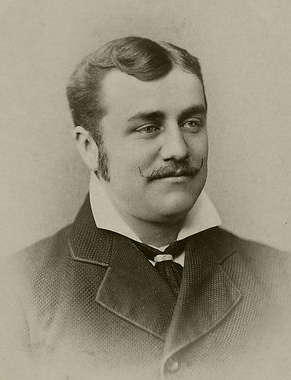
Charley Jones started his twelve-year professional career with Keokuk in 1875.

=== The 1875 season ===
In 1875, the NA entry fee was $20 for one championship season. The Westerns won one of 13 games (1–12 record) before going out of business. On June 14, 1875, the Western club played their last game and dropped out of the league two days later.

The Westerns were managed by Joe Simmons and played their home games at Perry Park, which was in a field located beyond Rand Park. Their top hitter was catcher Paddy Quinn, who went 14-for-43 for a batting average of .326.

=== Legacy ===
Many players from the Keokuk team managed to sign with bigger-name teams during or after the 1875 season. Charley Jones had the best post-Keokuk career, playing in the National League until 1880 and a further six seasons in the American Association after that. Mike Golden, Joe Miller, and Paddy Quinn played for the Chicago White Stockings after Keokuk folded, and Jimmy Hallinan and Billy Barnie played for the New York Mutuals.

Ahead of the 1876 season, stronger National Association clubs in larger cities, led by the Chicago White Stockings, organized the National League on a different basis, mainly in order to exclude weaker clubs from smaller cities such as Keokuk.

== See also ==
- 1875 Keokuk Westerns season
