= Quincy Indians =

Extinct minor league baseball team

- 1928–1933; Quincy, Illinois

Minor league affiliations
- Class: Class B
- League: Illinois–Indiana–Iowa League (1928-1932); Mississippi Valley League (1933)

Minor league titles
- League titles (2): 1929; 1931

Team data
- Ballpark: Eagles Stadium

The Quincy Indians were a minor league baseball team that existed from 1928 to 1933. They were located in Quincy, Illinois. From 1928 to 1932, they played in the Class B Illinois–Indiana–Iowa League, and in 1933, they played in the Class B Mississippi Valley League. The Indians' ballpark was Eagles Stadium.

== Year-by-year record ==
Year	Record	Finish	Manager	Playoffs
1928	50-85	8th	Joe Riggert / Hal Irelan	
1929	82-56	1st	Walter Holke	none / league champions
1930	78-58	2nd	Ray Schmidt	
1931	67-49	2nd	Walter Holke	league champions
1932	38-31	3rd	Syl Simon	team withdrew on July 15, causing league to fold
1933	53-59	4th	Joe Klugman	
