= Davenport Blue Sox =

- 1901–1937; (1901–1906, 1909–1916, 1929–1937); Davenport, Iowa

Minor league affiliations
- Previous classes: Class A (1934–1937); Class B (1933); Class D (1929–1932); Class B (1913–1916)
- League: Western League (1934–1937); Mississippi Valley League (1929–1933); Illinois–Indiana–Iowa League (1913–1916)

Major league affiliations
- Previous teams: Brooklyn Dodgers (1936–1937)

Minor league titles
- League titles: 3 (1914, 1933, 1936)

Team data
- Previous names: Davenport Blue Sox (1913–1916, 1929–1937); Davenport Prodigals (1909–1912); Davenport Knickerbockers (1906); Davenport Riversides (1905); Davenport River Rats (1901–1904)
- Previous parks: Blue Sox Park; Municipal Stadium

The Davenport Blue Sox was the name given to three minor league baseball teams based in Davenport, Iowa. The first version of the Blue Sox played in the Class B Three-I League from 1913–1916. The second played in the Class D Mississippi Valley League from 1929–1933, and the third version played in the Western League from 1934–1937. From 1936–1937, the team was a minor league affiliate of the Brooklyn Dodgers. The Blue Sox played their home games at Municipal Stadium from 1931–1937 and were the foundation for today's tenant, the Quad Cities River Bandits.

The 1933 club has been rated as the 58th best minor league baseball team of all time.

== Year-by-year records ==
Year	Record	Finish	Manager	Playoffs
1913	68-66	3rd	Daniel O'Leary	No playoffs held
1914	83-52	1st	Daniel O'Leary	League Champs
1915	76-52	1st (t)	Daniel O'Leary	Lost League Finals
1916	56-77	8th	Daniel O'Leary	No playoffs held
1929	69-57	3rd	Ed Reichle	No playoffs held
1930	64-61	3rd	Ed Reichle	No playoffs held
1931	53-73	6th	Ed Reichle / Cletus Dixon	No playoffs held
1932	78-47	1st	Cletus Dixon	Lost League Finals
1933	82-32	1st	Cletus Dixon	League Champs
1934	70-53	2nd	Cletus Dixon	Lost League Finals
1935	70-46	1st	Cletus Dixon	Lost in 1st round
1936	74-52	1st	Cletus Dixon	League Champs
1937	57-59	3rd	John Fitzpatrick	No playoffs held

== Notable alumni ==
- Davenport Blue Sox players
