= Syl Simon =

American baseball player

- Infielder
- Born: December 14, 1897; Evansville, Indiana, U.S.
- Died: February 28, 1973 (aged 75); Chandler, Indiana, U.S.
- Batted: Right Threw: Right

MLB debut
- October 1, 1923, for the St. Louis Browns

Last MLB appearance
- September 27, 1924, for the St. Louis Browns

MLB statistics
- Batting average: .242
- Home runs: 0
- Runs batted in: 6
- Stats at Baseball Reference

Teams
- St. Louis Browns (1923–1924)

Sylvester Adam Simon (December 14, 1897 – February 28, 1973) was an American professional baseball player for the St. Louis Browns in 1923 and 1924. He was an infielder, playing at both shortstop and third base. For his career he hit for a .242 batting average.

Simon sustained an injury to his hand but continued to play, earning him the respect of Babe Ruth, Lou Gehrig, Kenesaw Mountain Landis and others. However, after injuring his arm while playing for the Illinois-Indiana-Iowa League Quincy Indians in 1932, he decided to retire from playing.

Thirty years later, his wife instructed the Baseball Hall of Fame to include in his commemoration, "Tell youngsters there is no sport with the possibilities of baseball – it truly is our national pastime. Every boy, rich or poor, has a chance to make something of himself. There are no barriers of race religion or education. If [the glove and bat] can put heart or courage in someone, it will have done double duty.”
