= Perry Park (Iowa) =

Baseball grounds in Keokuk, Iowa

Coordinates: 40.41°N 91.38°W

Perry Park was the home field for the Keokuk Westerns of the National Association during the 1875 season, so it is considered a major league ballpark by those who count the NA as a major league. The Westerns played their first game against the Chicago White Stockings on May 4, 1875, at Perry Park, which was located in a field beyond Rand Park. They played their last game on June 14, 1875, against the New York Mutuals also at Perry Park.
