= Cletus Dixon =

- Born: April 26, 1899; Centerville, South Dakota, U.S.
- Died: April 1986 (aged 86–87)
- Batted: Left Threw: Left
- Stats at Baseball Reference

Cletus Loton "Smoke" Dixon (April 26, 1899 – April 1986) was an American baseball figure who played in the minor leagues from 1922 to 1935 and who managed at that level from 1924 to 1936. He is notable for leading four teams to league championship victories over the course of his 13-year managerial career.

== Career ==
Primarily a first baseman, Dixon hit .268 with 1,462 hits in 1,438 games. Not a power hitter, he hit only nine home runs in his career, with a career-high of five in a season. He also had 132 doubles and 46 triples. In 1925, he had his best season average-wise, hitting .323 in 124 games for the Waterloo Hawks.

Dixon managed the Waterloo Hawks from 1924 until 1930, leading them to league championship victory in 1924 (his first year as manager) and 1928. He skippered the Oklahoma City Indians for the beginning of 1929, eventually being replaced and taking the reins of the Davenport Blue Sox, who he managed until 1936. He led the Blue Sox to league championship glory in 1933 and 1936 (his final year managing in the minors). He also led to them to the league finals in 1932 and 1934, though they lost both times. They made it to the playoffs in 1935, though they did not get past the first round.
