= Wally Mattick =

American baseball player (1887–1968)

- Center fielder
- Born: March 12, 1887; St. Louis, Missouri, U.S.
- Died: November 5, 1968 (aged 81); Los Altos, California, U.S.
- Batted: Right Threw: Right

MLB debut
- April 11, 1912, for the Chicago White Sox

Last MLB appearance
- July 21, 1918, for the St. Louis Cardinals

MLB statistics
- Batting average: .227
- Stats at Baseball Reference

Teams
- Chicago White Sox (1912–1913); St. Louis Cardinals (1918)

Walter Joseph Mattick (March 12, 1887 – November 5, 1968) was an American Major League Baseball center fielder who played for the Chicago White Sox from 1912–1913 and briefly for the St. Louis Cardinals in 1918. He batted and threw right-handed.

Mattick's son Bobby Mattick played 5 seasons in the 1930s and 1940s, mostly with the Chicago Cubs.
