= Paul Speraw =

American baseball player (1893-1962)

- Third baseman
- Born: October 5, 1893; Annville, Pennsylvania, U.S.
- Died: February 22, 1962 (aged 68); Cedar Rapids, Iowa, U.S.
- Batted: Right Threw: Right

MLB debut
- September 15, 1920, for the St. Louis Browns

Last MLB appearance
- September 15, 1920, for the St. Louis Browns

MLB statistics
- Games played: 1
- At bats: 2
- Hits: 0
- Stats at Baseball Reference

Teams
- St. Louis Browns (1920)

Paul Bachman (Polly) Speraw (October 5, 1893 to February 22, 1962) was an American Major League Baseball third baseman. Speraw played for the St. Louis Browns in the 1920 season. In one career game, he had no hits in two at-bats. He batted and threw right-handed.

Speraw was born in Annville, Pennsylvania, and died in Cedar Rapids, Iowa.
