= Quincy Jets =

Minor league affiliations
- Class: A
- League: Midwest League

Major league affiliations
- Team: New York Mets (1962-1963)

Team data
- Ballpark: Quincy Stadium

The Quincy Jets were a former single-A minor league affiliate of the New York Mets from 1962 through 1963. The Jets played in the Midwest League at Quincy Stadium in Quincy, Illinois.

The Quincy Jets ended the 1963 season with a record of 56 wins and 68 losses, finishing ninth in the MWL. They had an attendance average of 529.
