= List of Midwest League champions =

The Midwest League of Minor League Baseball is one of three High-A baseball leagues in the United States. It was previously known as the Illinois State League from 1947 to 1948 and as the Mississippi-Ohio Valley League from 1949 to 1955, but has been the Midwest League since 1956 (with the exception of 2021 when known as the High-A Central). A league champion is determined at the end of each season. Champions have been determined by postseason playoffs, winning the regular season pennant, or being declared champion by the league office. For 2019, eight teams qualified for the postseason: the first- and second-half winners within each division, Eastern and Western, and wild card teams (the teams with the best second-place record) from each half in each division. Teams within each division met in a best-of-three quarterfinal round. The winners met in a best-of-three semifinal series to determine division champions. Then, the Eastern and Western division winners played a best-of-five series to determine a league champion. As of 2022, the winners of each division from both the first and second halves of the season meet in a best-of-three division series, with the winners of the two division series meeting in a best-of-three championship series.

== League champions ==
Score and finalist information is only presented when postseason play occurred. The lack of this information indicates a declared league champion.

Year	Champion	Series	Finalist
1947	Belleville Stags	NA	(Belleville won both halves)
1948	West Frankfort Cardinals	3–0	Mattoon Indians
1949	Paducah Chiefs	4–3	Mattoon Indians
1950^{[a]}	Centralia Sterlings	NA	(Finals Cancelled - weather)
1951	Danville Dans	2–0	Mount Vernon Kings
1952	Decatur Commodores	3–1	Hannibal Stags
1953	Decatur Commodores	3–2	Paris Lakers
1954	Danville Dans	3–0	Clinton Pirates
1955	Dubuque Packers	3–0	Mattoon Phillies
1956	Paris Lakers	3–1	Dubuque Packers
1957	Decatur Commodores	2–0	Clinton Pirates
1958	Waterloo Hawks	3–2	Michigan City White Caps
1959	Waterloo Hawks	NA	(Waterloo won both halves)
1960	Waterloo Hawks	NA	(Waterloo won both halves)
1961	Quincy Giants	3–2	Waterloo Hawks
1962	Dubuque Packers	3–1	Waterloo Hawks
1963	Clinton C-Sox	NA	(Clinton won both halves)
1964	Fox Cities Foxes	1–0	Clinton C-Sox
1965	Burlington Bees	NA	(Burlington won both halves)
1966	Fox Cities Foxes	2–1	Cedar Rapids Cardinals
1967	Appleton Foxes	2–0	Wisconsin Rapids Twins
1968	Quad City Angels	2–1	Decatur Commodores
1969	Appleton Foxes	NA	(Appleton won both halves)
1970	Quincy Cubs	2–0	Quad Cities Angels
1971	Quad City Angels	2–1	Appleton Foxes
1972	Danville Warriors	2–0	Appleton Foxes
1973	Wisconsin Rapids Twins	2–1	Danville Warriors
1974	Danville Warriors	2–1	Appleton Foxes
1975	Waterloo Royals	2–0	Quad Cities Angels
1976	Waterloo Royals	2–0	Quad Cities Angels
1977	Burlington Bees	2–0	Waterloo Indians
1978	Appleton Foxes	2–1	Burlington Bees
1979	Quad City Cubs	2–1	Waterloo Indians
1980	Waterloo Indians	2–1	Quad City Cubs
1981	Wausau Timbers	2–0	Quad City Cubs
1982	Appleton Foxes	2–1	Madison Muskies
1983	Appleton Foxes	3–1	Springfield Cardinals
1984	Appleton Foxes	3–2	Springfield Cardinals
1985	Kenosha Twins	3–1	Peoria Chiefs
1986	Waterloo Indians	3–0	Peoria Chiefs
1987	Kenosha Twins	3–1	Springfield Cardinals
1988	Cedar Rapids Reds	3–1	Kenosha Twins
1989	South Bend White Sox	3–0	Springfield Cardinals
1990	Quad City Angels	3–1	South Bend White Sox
1991	Clinton Giants	3–1	Madison Muskies
1992	Cedar Rapids Reds	3–2	Beloit Brewers
1993	South Bend White Sox	3–1	Clinton Giants
1994	Cedar Rapids Kernels	3–1	Rockford Royals
1995	Beloit Snappers	3–0	Michigan Battle Cats
1996	West Michigan Whitecaps	3–1	Wisconsin Timber Rattlers
1997	Lansing Lugnuts	3–2	Kane County Cougars
1998	West Michigan Whitecaps	3–1	Rockford Cubbies
1999	Burlington Bees	3–2	Wisconsin Timber Rattlers
2000	Michigan Battle Cats	3–0	Beloit Snappers
2001^{[b]}	Kane County Cougars	1–0	South Bend Silver Hawks
2002	Peoria Chiefs	3–1	Lansing Lugnuts
2003	Lansing Lugnuts	3–0	Beloit Snappers
2004	West Michigan Whitecaps	3–2	Kane County Cougars
2005	South Bend Silver Hawks	3–2	Wisconsin Timber Rattlers
2006	West Michigan Whitecaps	3–1	Kane County Cougars
2007	West Michigan Whitecaps	3–2	Beloit Snappers
2008^{[c]}	Burlington Bees	2–0	South Bend Silver Hawks
2009	Fort Wayne TinCaps	3–0	Burlington Bees
2010	Lake County Captains	3–2	Clinton LumberKings
2011	Quad Cities River Bandits	3–0	Lansing Lugnuts
2012	Wisconsin Timber Rattlers	3–1	Fort Wayne TinCaps
2013	Quad Cities River Bandits	3–0	South Bend Silver Hawks
2014	Kane County Cougars	3–0	Lake County Captains
2015	West Michigan Whitecaps	3–2	Cedar Rapids Kernels
2016	Great Lakes Loons	3–1	Clinton LumberKings
2017	Quad Cities River Bandits	3–0	Fort Wayne TinCaps
2018	Bowling Green Hot Rods	3–1	Peoria Chiefs
2019	South Bend Cubs	3–0	Clinton LumberKings
2020	None (season cancelled due to COVID-19 pandemic)		
2021	Quad Cities River Bandits	3–2	Cedar Rapids Kernels
2022	South Bend Cubs	2–1	Lake County Captains
2023	Cedar Rapids Kernels	2–1	Great Lakes Loons
2024	Lake County Captains	2–1	Wisconsin Timber Rattlers
2025	West Michigan Whitecaps	2–0	Cedar Rapids Kernels
2026	Quad Cities River Bandits	2–0	Dayton Dragons

== Championship wins by team ==
Active Midwest League teams appear in bold.

Wins	Team	Championship years
9	Fox Cities Foxes/Appleton Foxes/**Wisconsin Timber Rattlers**	1964, 1966, 1967, 1969, 1978, 1982, 1983, 1984, 2012
9	Waterloo Hawks/Royals/Indians/**Lansing Lugnuts**	1958, 1959, 1960, 1975, 1976, 1980, 1986, 1997, 2003
9	**Quad City Angels/Cubs/River Bandits**	1968, 1971, 1979, 1990, 2011, 2013, 2017, 2021, 2026
7	**West Michigan Whitecaps**	1996, 1998, 2004, 2006, 2007, 2015, 2025
6	Decatur Commodores/Wausau Timbers/Kane County Cougars	1952, 1953, 1957, 1981, 2001, 2014
5	**South Bend White Sox/Silver Hawks/Cubs**	1989, 1993, 2005, 2019, 2022
4	Burlington Bees	1965, 1977, 1999, 2008
4	**Cedar Rapids Reds/Kernels**	1988, 1992, 1994, 2023
4	Wisconsin Rapids Twins/Kenosha Twins/**Fort Wayne TinCaps**	1973, 1985, 1987, 2009
2	Clinton C-Sox/Giants	1963, 1991
2	Danville Dans	1951, 1954
2	Danville Warriors	1972, 1974
2	Dubuque Packers	1955, 1962
2	**Lake County Captains**	2010, 2024
2	Quincy Giants/Cubs	1961, 1970
2	Michigan Battle Cats/**Great Lakes Loons**	2000, 2016
1	Belleville Stags	1947
1	**Beloit Snappers**	1995
1	Bowling Green Hot Rods	2018
1	Centralia Sterlings	1950
1	Paducah Chiefs	1949
1	Paris Lakers	1956
1	**Peoria Chiefs**	2002
1	West Frankfort Cardinals	1948

== Notes ==
- ^{a} Centralia was declared champion after inclement weather and military call-ups forced the cancellation of the playoffs.
- ^{b} Kane County was declared champion after the playoffs were cancelled in the wake of the September 11 terrorist attacks, which caused a stoppage in professional baseball.
- ^{c} Burlington was declared champion after inclement weather forced the playoffs to be cut short.
