= West Frankfort Cardinals =

- 1947–1950; West Frankfort, Illinois

Minor league affiliations
- Class: Class D (1947–1950)
- League: Illinois State League (1947–1948); Mississippi–Ohio Valley League (1949–1950)

Major league affiliations
- Team: St. Louis Cardinals (1947–1950)

Minor league titles
- League titles (1): 1948
- Conference titles (1): 1948
- Wild card berths (2): 1949; 1950

Team data
- Name: West Frankfort Cardinals (1947–1950)
- Ballpark: Memorial Stadium (1947–1950)

The West Frankfort Cardinals were an American minor league baseball team based in West Frankfort, Illinois. The West Frankfort Cardinals played as members of the Illinois State League in 1947 to 1948 and the Mississippi–Ohio Valley League in 1949 and 1950, qualifying for the league playoffs twice. The two leagues were the direct predecessors to the Midwest League. West Frankfort was a minor affiliate of the St. Louis Cardinals for their duration, while hosting home games at Memorial Stadium.

Baseball Hall of Fame member Earl Weaver played for the 1948 West Frankfort Cardinals in his first professional season.

== History ==
The formation of the West Frankfort Cardinals was led by local businessmen Pete Mondino, Charlie Jacobs and Tony Finazzo. Through their efforts, the West Frankfort Baseball and Amusement Corporation was formed. In short order, a stadium was built, an affiliate secured and team was formed for West Frankfort in 1947. Mondino had been a minor league player and the manager of the Paducah Indians before returning to his hometown. The 1947 West Frankfort Cardinals became charter members of the six–team Class D level Illinois State League. Pete Mondino served as the team's general manager.

The Belleville Stags, Centralia Cubs, Marion Indians, Mattoon Indians and Mt. Vernon Braves teams joined West Frankfort in beginning Illinois State League play on May 4, 1947.

On May 24, 1947, West Frankfort played their home opener at Memorial Stadium with 2,896 fans in attendance. In pregame festivities, West Frankfort Mayor Luther Burpo threw out the ceremonial first pitch.

West Frankfort placed fourth in their first season of play and led the Illinois State League in home attendance. As an affiliate of the St. Louis Cardinals, the West Frankfort Cardinals finished the 1947 with an overall record of 42–60, playing the season under manager Everett Johnston. West Frankfort finished 23.0 games behind the champion Belleville Stags, who placed first in both half–season standings, negating the need for a playoff. Home attendance at Memorial Stadium was 43,004 for the season.

The 1948 West Frankfort Cardinals won the Illinois State League championship and pennant. In the 1948 regular season, the Cardinals' 85–35 record placed first in the regular season standings. The Cardinals played the season under manager Harold Contini and finished 9.5 games ahead of the second place Mattoon Indians. In the 1948 playoffs, West Frankfort defeated the Marion Indians 3 games to 1 to advance. In the Finals, the Cardinals swept the Mattoon Indians in 3 games to capture the championship. The Cardinals again led the league in home attendance with 36,656.

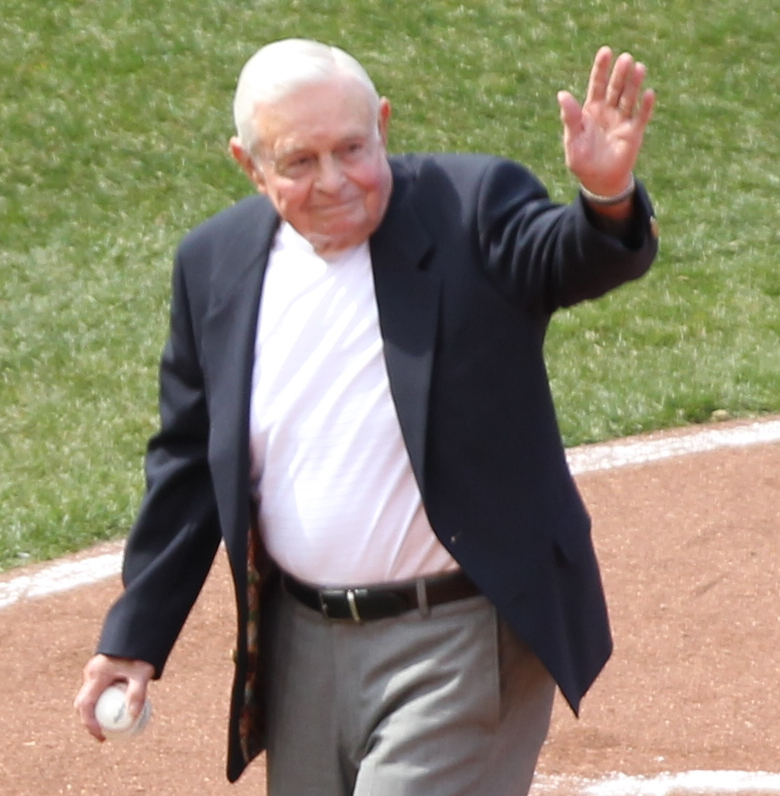
(2011) Baseball Hall of Fame member Earl Weaver

At age 17, Baseball Hall of Fame member Earl Weaver played for the champion West Frankfort Cardinals in 1948 in his first professional season. Weaver, who had received a $1,500 signing bonus, hit .268 playing in 120 games.

In 1949, the Cardinals continued play and became charter members of the Mississippi–Ohio Valley League after a league name change. The Illinois State League changed names after the Belleville franchise was replaced in the six–team league by the Paducah Chiefs, based in Kentucky. The Cardinals remained an affiliate of the St. Louis Cardinals and finished the Mississippi–Ohio Valley League regular season with a 71–49 record and qualified for the playoffs. The Cardinals placed second in the regular season standings under manager Robert Stanton, finishing 4.0 games behind the first place Centralia Cubs. In the first round of the playoffs, West Frankfort was defeated by eventual champion Paducah 3 games to 0. Season attendance in 1949 was 24,140.

In their final season of play, the West Frankfort Cardinals again placed second and qualified for the Mississippi–Ohio Valley League playoffs. As the Mississippi–Ohio Valley League expanded to an eight–team league, West Frankfort had a 72–47 record under manager Robert Stanton, finishing 9.0 games behind the first place Centralia Sterlings. West Frankfort played their final games in losing in the first round 3 games to 0 to the Paducah Chiefs. After 1950 season attendance of 20,910, seventh in the league, the franchise folded.

West Frankfort was not replaced in the 1951 season, as the Mississippi–Ohio Valley League reduced to six teams. West Frankfort has not hosted another minor league team.

On August 30, 2008, the Southern Illinois Miners of the independent Frontier League, based in nearby Marion, Illinois, honored the West Frankfort Cardinals during their game.

Franklin County, Illinois. Incorporated and Unincorporated areas West Frankfort, Illinois.

== The ballpark ==
The West Frankfort Cardinals hosted home minor league home games at Memorial Stadium. In 1947, owners of the new franchise purchased an 8.8-acre site, once used to store coal and dynamite from nearby mines, and construction began on the field and stadium. Memorial Stadium opened on May 24, 1957. It is believed the stadium name came to honor those killed in mine working.

Memorial Stadium hosted two league All-Star games: the 1947 Illinois State League All-Star Game and the 1950 Mississippi–Ohio Valley League All-Star Game. The Illinois State League All-Star Game was played on August 11, 1947. The game featured the Belleville Stags against an All-Star selected roster, as Belleville had the best first-half record. The All-Stars defeated Belleville 5–1 in front of 2,134 fans.

On July 13, 1950, West Frankfort hosted the Mississippi–Ohio Valley League All-Star Game at Memorial Stadium.

In 1951, after the departure of the Cardinals, the stadium hosted an exhibition game featuring local semi-pro team, the Orient Miners of the Southern Illinois Semi-Pro League played a barnstorming professional team at the park. Baseball Hall of Fame inductee Satchel Paige pitched for the barnstormers, who won 3–1. Ned Garver and future Hall of Famer Earl Weaver were also on the professional team.

Memorial Stadium went largely unused after the Cardinals left following the 1950 season. In 1956, the ballpark and land was sold to the US Government and the National Guard Armory was built at the site. The Armory is located at 802 West Main Street,\ in West Frankfort, Illinois.

== Media ==
The team is the subject of the book: Season of Change: Baseball, Coal Mining, and a Small Town's Struggle to Beat the Odds (2011) by author Toby J. Brooks. ISBN 978-0984736201

== Timeline ==
Year(s)	# Yrs.	Team	Level	League	Affiliate	Ballpark
1947–1948	2	West Frankfort Cardinals	Class D	Illinois State League	St. Louis Cardinals	Memorial Stadium
1949–1950	2	West Frankfort Cardinals	Class D	Mississippi–Ohio Valley League	St. Louis Cardinals	Memorial Stadium

== Year–by–year records ==
Year	Record	Finish	Manager	Playoffs/Notes
1947	42–60	4th	Everett Johnston	No playoffs held
1948	85–35	1st	Harold Contini	League champions
1949	71–49	2nd	Robert Stanton	Lost in 1st Round
1950	72–47	2nd	Robert Stanton	Lost in 1st Round

== Notable alumni ==
- Earl Weaver (1948) Inducted to Baseball Hall of Fame, 1996
- Eddie Phillips (1950)
- Johnny Reagan (1949)
- Rip Repulski (1947) MLB All-Star

== See also ==
West Frankfort Cardinals players
