= Madison Hatters =

- 1994; Madison, Wisconsin
Team logo
Cap insignia

Minor league affiliations
- Class: Class A (1994)
- League: Midwest League (1994)
- Division: Southern Division

Major league affiliations
- Team: St. Louis Cardinals (1994)

Team data
- Name: Madison Hatters (1994)
- Colors: Red, black, white, yellow, gray, pink
- Mascot: Madcap Mouse
- Ballpark: Warner Park (1994)

The Madison Hatters were a minor-league baseball team based in Madison, Wisconsin, in 1994. A Class A minor league baseball affiliate of the St. Louis Cardinals, they were a member of the Midwest League. The team played its home games at Warner Park.

Following the departure of the Madison Muskies after the 1993 season, the Springfield Cardinals franchise moved from Springfield, Illinois to Madison and became the Madison Hatters. The team never intended to stay in Madison for more than one season, and at the end of the 1994 campaign they moved to Battle Creek, Michigan, where they became the Michigan Battle Cats. The team again relocated for the 2007 season to Midland, Michigan, and they are now known as the Great Lakes Loons.

== Team history ==
After the 1993 season, the Madison Muskies, which had represented Madison in the Midwest League from 1982 to 1993, moved to Grand Rapids, Michigan, which had constructed a new stadium, to become the West Michigan Whitecaps. As a replacement, Madison obtained the Springfield Cardinals franchise, which was renamed the Madison Hatters.

The Hatters' mascot was "Madcap Mouse", a costumed performer dressed as a mouse wearing a red tuxedo and top hat. Local Madison 21-year old Scott Kelly portrayed Madcap, and was paid $50 per game, more than any player.

The team played well during the first half of 1994, finishing in second place in the seven-team Southern Division with a 37–33 record, just one game behind the Springfield Sultans. In the second half, however, their performance dropped off as they finished in fifth place with a 29–40 record. Joe Cunningham was the manager. Two players—outfielder Joe McEwing and pitcher Jay Witasick—were named to the league's post-season all-star team. McEwing hit .324 with 4 home runs and 47 runs batted in, while Witasick went 10–4 with a 2.32 earned run averaged and 141 strikeouts. Jeff Matulevich led the league with 30 saves.

With the pre-season announcement that the Hatters intended to be in Madison only one year, their attendance was weak, with a season total of 69,060 (11th in the 14-team league), down from the 101,219 attending the Muskies' games the previous season. By September, the city of Battle Creek had committed to stadium improvements to bring the Hatters to their city, and the Midwest League departed from Madison.
