= Southern Illinois Miners =

- 2007–2021; Marion, Illinois

Team logo	Cap insignia

Minor league affiliations
- Class: Independent (2007–2021)
- League: Frontier League (2007–2021)

Minor league titles
- League titles (1): 2012
- Division titles (4): 2010; 2014; 2015; 2016

Team data
- Name: Southern Illinois Miners (2007–2021)
- Colors: Black, white, gold, silver
- Ballpark: Rent One Park (2007–2021)
- Owner/ Operator: Jayne Simmons
- General manager: Cathy Perry
- Manager: Mike Pinto
- Media: Marion Daily Republican, The Southern Illinoisan
- Website: southernillinoisminers.com

The Southern Illinois Miners were a professional baseball team based in Marion, Illinois. The Miners were members of the West Division of the independent Frontier League. From 2007 to 2021, the Miners played their home games at Rent One Park.

The "Miners" name refers to the Southern Illinois region's history of coal mining.

The Miners won their first and only Frontier League championship in 2012.

Following the 2021 season, the team owners announced that their retirement would also result in the franchise's folding.

== History ==
The city of Marion had not hosted any professional baseball team since the departure of the Marion Indians after the 1948 season. The Indians played for only two seasons in the Class D Illinois State League.

John Simmons, an Illinois lawyer, originally proposed the Marion ballpark for an affiliated professional Minor League Baseball team, but that request was rejected by the Midwest League. However, Simmons remained interested in bringing professional baseball to Marion, so he petitioned several independent leagues for membership. In August 2006, Marion was officially announced as an expansion franchise of the Frontier League, to begin play in 2007. The region's close proximity to existing teams made Southern Illinois a natural fit for the Frontier League.

=== 2007 inaugural season ===
The Miners began their inaugural season on May 23, 2007, on the road against the Gateway Grizzlies, with the franchise's first home run hit by Tim Dorn that same night. Six days later, they played their first home game against the Evansville Otters, winning 9–6 in front of a crowd of 6,251. The team set a new Frontier League attendance record by hosting 259,392 fans (the prior record was 217,500 set by Gateway in 2004). The Miners also became the first team in Frontier League history to average over 5,000 fans per game for a season (5,086). In addition, Southern Illinois Miners fans contributed heavily to supporting their lead mascot, Big John, to become the record-setting overall winner of the Best Logo in Minor League Baseball, awarded April 2, 2008, by CNBC following their largest online poll ever. The Umpire was Wesley Penrod of Cobden, Il.

=== 2008 season: first playoff appearance ===
After going 49–47 in their first season, the Miners made their first playoff appearance in 2008. Led by postseason all-star outfielder Joey Metropoulos (who hit .315 with 20 home runs and 66 RBIs) and Frontier League Pitcher of the Year Ryan Bird (who went 13–3 with a 2.48 ERA and league-best 152 strikeouts), Southern Illinois went 58–38, making the postseason as a wild card entrant. On September 8, they won their first playoff game in team history, defeating the Windy City ThunderBolts 4–2 at home. They ultimately fell in the division series to the eventual league champion ThunderBolts in four games.

=== 2010 season: record-setting win streak, All-Star Game, first division title ===
The 2010 Season was a historic season for the Miners as they set a Frontier League record with a 20-game winning streak from June 9 to June 28, and with 64 total wins, they tied the record for second-most wins in a season in league history. That year, Rent One Park hosted its first-ever Frontier League All-Star Game, with the Miners sending 10 players to the midseason showcase while sporting a 39–9 record at the All-Star break. Thanks to a league-best 64–32 overall record, they also claimed their first-ever division title and made their second playoff appearance, falling in a hotly contested five-game series to the River City Rascals three games to two.

=== 2012 season: first Frontier League championship ===
After again making the postseason in 2011 with a 58–38 record, but again falling to River City in the Division Series, Southern Illinois made the playoffs as a wild card entrant at 55–39, finishing one win ahead of Windy City and the Schaumburg Boomers. The Miners faced the Traverse City Beach Bums, who finished with the league's best record at 64–32, in the division series. In Game 1 on the road, the Miners shut out the Beach Bums 1–0 behind a solo home run by postseason all-star outfielder Javier Herrera (acquired in a trade with the Rockford RiverHawks earlier in the season) and eight shutout innings from ace right-hander David Harden. In the second game, Traverse City scored three runs in the first inning and led 4–0 in the sixth before the Miners came back with three runs in the sixth and a game-tying RBI single by Cory Harrilchak in the eighth inning. With the score still tied at 4–4 in the tenth inning, outfielder Ken Gregory hit a go-ahead solo home run, which eventually proved to be the winning run in a 5–4 Miners extra-inning victory. Southern Illinois completed the sweep of the favored Beach Bums by winning Game 3 at home 4–3, sending the club to their first-ever Frontier League championship series.

In the championship series, the Miners took on the Florence Freedom, who had beaten the Gateway Grizzlies in a five-game series three games to two. Again, the Miners opened the series on the road, and again they took the first two games of the series. In Game 1, trailing 1–0 in the third inning, Southern Illinois got back-to-back home runs by catcher Chris Anderson (a two-run shot) and second baseman Cannon Lester to take a 3–1 lead. Florence would rally to tie the score with two runs in the sixth, but two Freedom errors in the seventh brought home the eventual winning run. The Miners added an RBI double in the eighth by Gregory to complete the scoring as they won 5–3.

In Game 2, Southern Illinois used home runs from Gregory, Lester and shortstop Jake Kaase to jump out to a 5–2 lead after six innings. Florence made it a one-run game with a two-run seventh inning, but the Miners responded with four runs in the eighth, including a three-run home run by outfielder Chad Maddox, to pull away and win 9–4.

Florence denied the Miners a clean sweep of the post season with a slim 4–3 victory in Game 3 at Rent One Park, setting up Game 4 on September 16 at home. After taking a 3–0 lead thanks to a three-run fourth inning that included a two-run blast by Maddox, Florence rallied to tie the game with two runs in the seventh and one run in the eighth. The game remained knotted at 3–3 into extra innings, with neither team being able to break through until the bottom of the 12th. With the bases loaded and two outs, Kaase drew a walk from Florence's Brent Choban to force in the championship-winning run as the Miners claimed their first league title in team history. Lester, who hit .500 (8-for-16) with two doubles, two home runs and three RBIs in the series, was named the championship series MVP.

=== 2014–2016: continued success ===
After the Miners missed the playoffs in 2013 for the first time since 2009, Southern Illinois finished with a 60–36 record in 2014, clinching the East Division title on September 3 (the second-to-last day of the regular season) with a road victory over the Lake Erie Crushers. It was the second divisional championship in team history. That year, they also retired uniform number 31 for 2009 Frontier League MVP Joey Metropoulos, the first retired number in team history. Ace left-hander Matt Bywater won the team's second Frontier League Pitcher of the Year Award.

In 2015, the Miners finished with the second-best record in team history, going 63–33 to finish with the league's best record. They also won their second-straight East Division championship, clinching it in memorable fashion on August 30 with a walk-off, two-run home run by third baseman Steve Marino against Traverse City. Right-handed starter Adam Lopez went 10–0 with a 1.86 ERA to become the second-straight Miners hurler to win the league's Pitcher of the Year Award. The Miners also retired number 13 for all-time wins and strikeouts leader Ryan Bird in 2015, the second retired number in team history.

In 2016, the Miners celebrated their 10th anniversary season with more on-field success, with a second-straight 63–33 regular season. They won their third-straight division championship (this time in the West Division) by 7 1/2 games over the second-place Evansville Otters, becoming the second team in Frontier League history to win three straight division titles (after the 2005–2007 Washington Wild Things) and the first team in league history to win 60 or more games in three consecutive seasons.

=== 2017–2019 ===
The Miners retired number 20 for player/coach/instructor Ralph Santana in 2017. Santana was the team's first post season all-star in 2007 as a second baseman, and served as hitting coach from 2008 to 2013, earning Frontier League Coach of the Year honors in 2012. They finished the year with a 39–57 record, their first (and to date, only) season with a losing record.

The Miners posted a 48–47 mark in 2018, their 11th winning season in 12 years.

In 2019 the Miners ended the year with a 53–43 record, their 12th winning season in 13 years. They also had their first post season all-star players since 2016, with Chase Cunningham going 10–5 with a 3.23 ERA and 132 strikeouts in a team-record 136 2/3 innings pitched to become their fifth Frontier League Pitcher of the Year, and outfielder Kyle Davis also taking home post season all-star honors. Cunningham finished atop the circuit in wins and innings while finishing second by one in strikeouts, and Davis finished in the league's top-10 in home runs (15) and RBIs (62).

=== 2020–2021: Final Season and Folding ===
Due to the Frontier League absorbing five teams from the former Can-Am League in October 2019, the Miners were placed in the new Midwestern Division of the league. The Miners' 2020 season was suspended on June 24 when the Frontier League announced it too would suspend the 2020 championship season due to the COVID-19 pandemic.

On October 6, 2021, after going 54-42 (.563) and coming 3rd in the West Division but missing the playoffs, owners Jayne and John Simmons announced they would be retiring from professional baseball, ceasing the operations of the Southern Illinois Miners.

2021 would also see the final set of baseball cards produced for the Miners. These had previously been printed and distributed by Grandstand, a company that specialize in the manufacturing of cards for Minor League teams.

Mike Pinto was the Miners Manager and this was his 14th season . It was also his 4th year in the dual role of Chief Operating Officer of the Miners.

== Team honors ==
The Miners have won the Frontier League Organization Of The Year Award three times (2007, 2009, 2010).

Southern Illinois finished with a winning record in each of their first ten seasons, from 2007 to 2016, representing a Frontier League record.

The team has sent a total of 66 players to the league's All-Star game in 13 seasons, with 17 post season all-stars in their history including five Pitchers of the Year (2008: Ryan Bird, 2010: Joe Augustine, 2014: Matt Bywater, 2015: Adam Lopez, 2019: Chase Cunningham), one league Most Valuable Player (2009: Joey Metropoulos) and one Rookie of the Year (2016: Shane Kennedy).

As of the end of the 2019 season, the Miners have had 59 former players signed by Major League Baseball organizations. Three former Miners (Tanner Roark, Clay Zavada and Brandon Cunniff) have made it to the major leagues.

Mike Pinto is / was the only Manager that the Miners have ever had. He held the title as the All Time Leader in Frontier League history in managerial wins.

== Season-by-season records ==
Division champions	Frontier League Champions

Southern Illinois Miners (Frontier League)
Season	W–L	Win %	Finish	Postseason	Individual/team postseason awards	Home attendance
2007	49–47	.510	2nd in FL West	Did not qualify	Frontier League Organization of the Year; Postseason All-Star: 2B Ralph Santana	259,392
2008	58–38	.604	2nd in FL West	Lost in first round vs Windy City ThunderBolts 3–1	Frontier League Pitcher of the Year: RHP Ryan Bird; Postseason All-Star: RHP Ryan Bird; Postseason All-Star: OF Joey Metropoulos	218,191
2009	56–40	.583	3rd in FL West	Did not qualify	Frontier League Organization of the Year; Frontier League MVP: OF Joey Metropoulos; Postseason All-Star: SS Tony Roth; Postseason All-Star: OF Joey Metropoulos	209,477
2010	64–32	.667	1st in FL West	Lost in first round vs River City Rascals 3–2	Frontier League Organization of the Year; Frontier League Pitcher of the Year: RHP Joe Augustine; Postseason All-Star: RHP Joe Augustine; Postseason All-Star: OF Jereme Milons	204,181
2011	58–38	.604	2nd in FL West	Lost in first round vs River City Rascals 3–1	Postseason All-Star: 2B Will Block	181,576
2012	55–39	.585	3rd in FL East	Won first round vs Traverse City Beach Bums 3–0; Won Frontier League Championship Series vs Florence Freedom 3–1	Postseason All-Star: OF Javier Herrera; Championship Series MVP: INF Cannon Lester	129,936
2013	50–46	.521	5th in FL East	Did not qualify		126,084
2014	60–36	.625	1st in FL East	Lost in first round vs Schaumburg Boomers 2–1	Frontier League Pitcher of the Year: LHP Matt Bywater; Postseason All-Star: LHP Matt Bywater	147,287
2015	63–33	.656	1st in FL East	Lost in first round vs River City Rascals 2–1	Frontier League Pitcher of the Year: RHP Adam Lopez; Postseason All-Star: RHP Adam Lopez; Postseason All-Star: OF Michael Earley	151,503
2016	63–33	.656	1st in FL West	Lost in first round vs River City Rascals 3–1	Frontier League Rookie of the Year: UTIL Shane Kennedy Postseason All-Star: 3B Steve Marino; Postseason All-Star: OF Shane Kennedy; Postseason All-Star: DH Craig Massey	153,940
2017	39–57	.406	5th in FL West	Did not qualify		151,521
2018	48–47	.505	4th in FL West	Did not qualify		109,691
2019	53–43	.552	4th in FL West	Did not qualify	Frontier League Pitcher of the Year: RHP Chase Cunningham; Postseason All-Star: RHP Chase Cunningham; Postseason All-Star: OF Kyle Davis	101,441
2020				Season not played due to COVID-19		
2021	54–42	.563	3rd in FL West	Did not qualify	Postseason All-Star: RHP Zac Westcott; Postseason All-Star: OF Nolan Earley	66,099
All-Time Record	716–529	.575		7 Playoff appearances, 4 Division titles, 1 Championship	3 Frontier League Organization of the Year Awards 1 Frontier League MVP 5 Frontier League Pitchers of the Year 1 Frontier League Championship Series MVP 17 Frontier League Postseason All-Stars	—

== Notable Miners ==
- Danny Almonte (2007)
- Clay Zavada (2008)
- Tanner Roark (2008)
- Brandon Cunniff (2012-2013)
- Williams Pérez (2018)
- Nick Duron (2019)
- Alejandro Chacín (2020-2021)
- Ryan Miller (2021)
- Several of these notable Miners played for major teams and had their own MLB baseball cards that collectors and fans of the Miners may be interested in obtaining.
