= Bob Turley =

American baseball player (1930–2013)

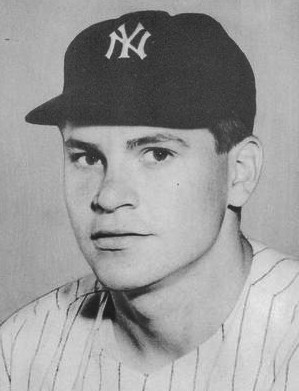
- Turley in 1957
- Pitcher
- Born: September 19, 1930; Troy, Illinois, U.S.
- Died: March 30, 2013 (aged 82); Atlanta, Georgia, U.S.
- Batted: Right Threw: Right

MLB debut
- September 29, 1951, for the St. Louis Browns

Last MLB appearance
- September 21, 1963, for the Boston Red Sox

MLB statistics
- Win–loss record: 101–85
- Earned run average: 3.64
- Strikeouts: 1,265
- Stats at Baseball Reference

Teams
- St. Louis Browns / Baltimore Orioles (1951, 1953–1954); New York Yankees (1955–1962); Los Angeles Angels (1963); Boston Red Sox (1963)

Career highlights and awards
- 3× All-Star (1954, 1955, 1958); 2× World Series champion (1956, 1958); Cy Young Award (1958); World Series MVP (1958); AL wins leader (1958); AL strikeout leader (1954)

Robert Lee Turley (September 19, 1930 – March 30, 2013), known as "Bullet Bob", was an American professional baseball player and financial planner. He played in Major League Baseball (MLB) as a pitcher from 1951 through 1963. After his retirement from baseball, he worked for Primerica Financial Services.

Turley made his MLB debut with the St. Louis Browns in 1951, and stayed with the team through their first season in Baltimore, when he appeared in his first MLB All-Star Game. After the 1954 season, he was traded to the New York Yankees. With the Yankees, Turley appeared in two more All-Star Games. He led the American League in wins in 1958, and won the Cy Young Award, World Series Most Valuable Player Award, and Hickok Belt that year. He finished his playing career with the Los Angeles Angels and Boston Red Sox in 1963, and then coached the Red Sox in 1964.

Turley began working in financial planning during the baseball offseason. In 1977, he cofounded with Arthur L. Williams Jr. the company that would become Primerica. He also invested in real estate, buying and selling 27 houses in Florida.

== Early life ==
Turley was born in Troy, Illinois. He was raised in East St. Louis, Illinois. He attended East St. Louis Senior High School in East St. Louis, and played for the school's baseball squad for three years. He was used as both a starter and reliever, becoming the staff's ace pitcher by the end of his senior season, in 1948. Turley won the team's sportsmanship award that year.

Bill DeWitt, the general manager of the St. Louis Browns, brought Turley to Sportsman's Park for a tryout. Turley also attended a workout camp for the New York Yankees, held in Maryville, Illinois. The day after he graduated from high school in 1948, Turley signed with the Browns as an amateur free agent. He received a $600 signing bonus ($8,040 in current dollar terms).

== Professional career ==
=== Minor leagues and St. Louis Browns / Baltimore Orioles ===
Turley made his professional debut that year in Minor League Baseball with the Belleville Stags of the Class D Illinois State League, pitching to a 9–3 win–loss record. He was promoted to the Aberdeen Pheasants of the Class C Northern League in 1949, and led the league in wins with 23, and strikeouts with 205. He split the 1950 season with the Wichita Indians of the Class A Western League and the San Antonio Missions of the Class AA Texas League. Turley led Wichita in the Western League playoffs. In 1951, he played for San Antonio. He appeared in the Texas League's All-Star Game, and was named the league's most valuable player at the end of the season. He struck out 22 batters in one game for San Antonio.

Turley played his first game in the major leagues on September 29, 1951. He lost to the Chicago White Sox. He did not pitch again in 1951, and after the season ended, he enlisted with the United States Army for two years. Turley returned to the Browns in August 1953, and caught attention for his high strikeout rate. Turley remained with the team after they moved to Baltimore, Maryland, to become the Baltimore Orioles in 1954. He earned $9,000 ($107,900 in current dollar terms) for the 1954 season. He pitched the first game at Memorial Stadium, striking out nine in a complete game. A power pitcher, Turley recorded many strikeouts, but did not have great control. For the 1954 season, he led the American League in strikeouts with 185, but also led the league with 181 walks. That year, he earned comparisons to fellow fireballer Bob Feller, and finished in third place in balloting for the Hickok Belt, given to the professional athlete of the year.

While playing for the Orioles, Turley obtained the nickname "Bullet Bob". The magazine Look wrote a story about Turley, and wanted to measure the velocity of his fastball. They used a bullet timer from the Aberdeen Proving Grounds, which recorded a speed of 98 miles per hour (158 km/h) by the time it reached home plate.

Casey Stengel, the manager of the New York Yankees, sought to acquire Turley. The Yankees needed younger starting pitchers, as their rotation fell off due to the ages of Allie Reynolds, Eddie Lopat, Johnny Sain, Tommy Byrne, and Jim Konstanty. In order to acquire the hitting the Orioles decided they needed to compete, they traded Turley to the Yankees after the 1954 season. The Yankees received Turley, Billy Hunter, Don Larsen, and players to be named later, while the Orioles acquired Harry Byrd, Jim McDonald, Willy Miranda, Hal Smith, Gus Triandos, Gene Woodling, and players to be named later. To complete the trade, the Yankees sent Bill Miller, Kal Segrist, Don Leppert, and Ted Del Guercio to the Orioles, and the Orioles sent Mike Blyzka, Darrell Johnson, Jim Fridley and Dick Kryhoski to the Yankees. Comprising 17 players, this trade remains the largest in MLB history.

=== New York Yankees ===
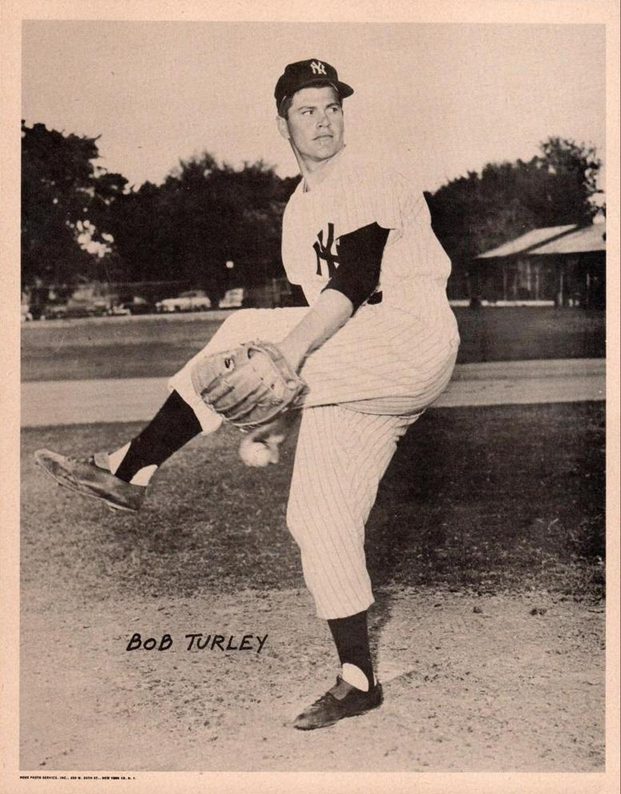
Turley in 1955 photo

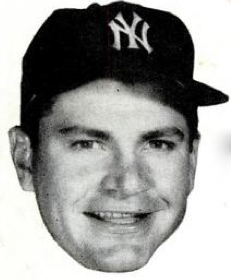
Headshot of Turley in 1959

Turley played for the Yankees from 1955 to 1962. In the 1955 season, Turley won 17 games for the Yankees, and recorded 210 strikeouts, second to Herb Score (245). However, he also led the league in walks with 177. The Yankees won the American League pennant, and advanced to the 1955 World Series, where they faced the Brooklyn Dodgers. He pitched in the third game of the series but was tabbed for four runs as he was taken out in the second inning of the subsequent 8–3 loss. He subsequently appeared in two relief for Game 5 and Game 6 as the Dodgers defeated the Yankees in seven games.

Turley had a disappointing season in 1956, with an 8–4 win–loss record and a 5.05 earned run average (ERA). However, the Yankees again won the American League pennant. Turley appeared in the first two games of the World Series against the Dodgers as a relief pitcher. He was tabbed to start Game 6 against Clem Labine; Turley pitched a complete game, but the Yankees lost the game by a 1–0 score to force a decisive Game 7, although the Yankees won that game to win the series and give Turley his first championship.

In the 1957 season, Turley developed a curveball. He finished the season with a 2.71 ERA, good for fourth-best in the American League as the Yankees won the pennant again. In the World Series that year, facing the Milwaukee Braves, Turley was tabbed to start Game 3, but after loading the bases in the second inning, he was taken out for Don Larsen, who finished the game en route to victory. In Game 6, Turley was the starter and threw a complete game, allowing four hits and two runs as the Yankees staved off elimination with a 3–2 victory; the Yankess lost the next day in Game 7 to lose the series.

Fellow pitcher Sal Maglie wrote during 1958 spring training that Turley "ha[d] started to step off the mound when things get a little shaky, take a couple of deep breaths and then go back to work." Maglie thought this helped with Turley's self-control, a characteristic Maglie considered one of the three most essential to a successful pitcher.

By the 1958 season, Turley changed his delivery in an effort to improve his control, by using a no-wind up pitching position. He proved to have his best season that year when he won 21 games and lost seven, for an American League-leading .750 winning percentage. He also led the American League with 19 complete games, and finished with the sixth-best ERA (2.97), although his 128 walks also led the league. Turley started Game 2 of the World Series against the Braves and proceeded to allow a leadoff home run to Bill Bruton to go along with two further hits and a walk before being taken out for Duke Maas, one of four pitchers utilized to get 26 combined outs as the Yankees lost for the second straight game. Facing elimination in Game 5, Turley threw a complete-game shutout to keep the Yankees alive. In Game 6 one day later, Turley was tabbed to step in for Ryne Duren in the 10th inning with the Yankees up 4–3 with two outs and two runners on base to face Frank Torre. He got him to lineout to second base to end the game. In Game 7 the following day, he relieved Don Larsen in the third inning and won his second game in three days, throwing 6 2/3 innings of two-hit relief. The Yankees became just the second team to recover from a 3–1 World Series deficit, and Turley was voted the World Series Most Valuable Player Award. As a result of his 1958 season, Turley won the Hickok Belt as top professional athlete of the year, receiving twice as many votes as Jim Brown, the second-place finisher. He also won the Cy Young Award as the best pitcher in Major League Baseball, edging Warren Spahn of the Braves by one vote, and Lew Burdette of the Braves and Bob Friend of the Pittsburgh Pirates by two votes. Turley finished second in the American League Most Valuable Player Award voting, losing to Jackie Jensen of the Boston Red Sox. Additionally, he won The Sporting News' Player of the Year and Pitcher of the Year Awards.

Turley earned a $35,000 salary for the 1959 season, his highest as a baseball player. The Yankees chose Turley to be their Opening Day starting pitcher for the 1959 season, opposing Tom Brewer of the Red Sox. The Yankees won the game by a 3–2 score. However, Turley's fastball began to lose its effectiveness. He increased the usage of his curveball to compensate. Turley finished the year with an 8–11 win–loss record. In the 1960 season, Turley had a 9–3 win–loss record, and his 3.27 ERA was the seventh best in the American League. He started Game Two of the 1960 World Series against the Pirates, earning the win. He also started the deciding Game Seven, which the Pirates won, taking the series.

Turley suffered through discomfort in his right elbow during the 1961 season, which resulted in a 3–5 win–loss record and 5.75 ERA in only 15 games pitched. New manager Ralph Houk began to emphasize his younger pitchers, as he removed Turley from the starting rotation and used him as a relief pitcher. Though the Yankees reached the 1961 World Series, and defeated the Cincinnati Reds four games to one, Turley did not make an appearance. After seeking medical attention, Turley was diagnosed with bone chips in his elbow. He underwent surgery in the offseason to remove the bone chips, and returned to the Yankees confident his performance would improve in 1962. He agreed to a salary cut, from $28,000 to $25,000. However, the bone chips recurred during the 1962 season. As a result, his effectiveness was limited in 1962 as well. On June 25, Turley started a game that lasted 22 innings, and a record seven hours, but was removed after recording only one out. During the 1962 season, American League players elected Turley as their player representative, following Woodling's trade to the National League. Over the season, Turley pitched to a 4.57 ERA in only 69 innings. The Yankees defeated the San Francisco Giants four games to three in the 1962 World Series, but Turley was not an active participant.

=== Los Angeles Angels, Boston Red Sox, and coaching ===
After the 1962 season, the Yankees sold Turley to the Los Angeles Angels for cash, in the first move made by new Yankees' general manager Roy Hamey, who sought to rebuild the Yankees pitching staff. The move was conditional; the Angels could return Turley if they were not satisfied with him. The Angels chose to retain Turley at the start of the 1963 season. Turley struggled, winning two games while losing seven, and the Angels released him in July. A week later, he signed with the Boston Red Sox. Turley retired after the 1963 season, with a 101–85 win–loss record and a 3.64 ERA in 12 seasons.

After the 1963 season, Turley agreed to remain with the Red Sox as their pitching coach, succeeding Harry Dorish. Turley spent one season as the Red Sox' pitching coach, and was released at the end of the year. He attempted to make a comeback as a pitcher with the Houston Astros in 1965, but did not make the team. He then agreed to become the pitching coach for the Richmond Braves of the International League, a minor league team in the Atlanta Braves organization, in 1966, but resigned before the start of the 1966 season.

=== Sign stealing ===
Turley got into the habit while on the bench of stealing signs when he saw the opposing pitcher throw. Using a system of whistling where be whistled if the next pitch was different from the last, he would attempt to help any Yankee who wanted the advice, with Johnny Blanchard and Elston Howard being appreciative of the help while Moose Skowron and Yogi Berra did not care. In one instance, Jim Bunning of the Detroit Tigers noticed the system and pointed to Turley to stop or he would knock down the batter (which happened to be Mickey Mantle). When Turley whistled anyway, he threw a missile in the middle of the box that Mantle missed on, which led to the next batter in Berra pleading that he wasn't listening to whistles. In 1961, even when he was on the injured list, he remained on the bench to do his system, and Tony Kubek estimated that Mickey Mantle hit fifty homeruns in part due to Turley, and Mantle once credited half of his home runs to Turley. Roger Maris and his historic 61st home run was hit after the sign for the pitch was decoded by the third base coach, an acolyte of Turley's system. He authored an article titled "How I Know What Pitchers Will Throw" in the 20 July 1964 issue of Sports Illustrated which was about his sign stealing based on the tendencies of opposing pitchers.

== Personal life ==
Turley moved from East St. Louis to Lutherville, Maryland, in 1954, when the Browns moved to Baltimore. Though he played in Baltimore for one season, he remained in Lutherville for the remainder of his baseball career, and sent his children to the local public schools.

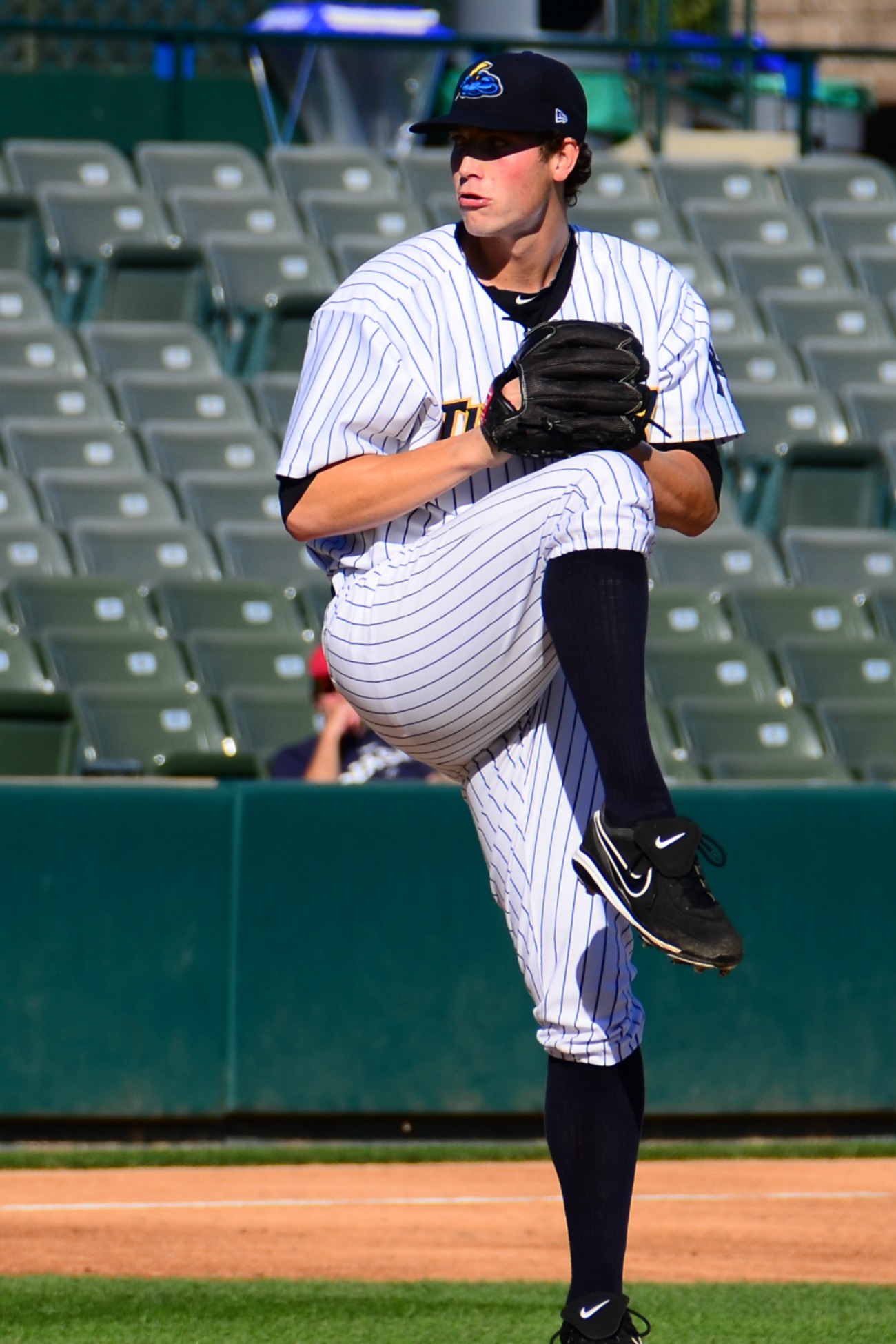
Nik Turley, who described Bob Turley as a "distant relative"

Turley began working as a financial planner in 1957, by selling life insurance. He also operated a bowling alley in Bel Air, Maryland, and an insurance firm in Baltimore. In 1977, Turley joined with Arthur L. Williams Jr. and five others to found A. L. Williams & Associates, an insurance company. At A. L. Williams, agents advised clients to purchase term life insurance, rather than cash value life insurance, and invest the money they saved in mutual funds. The company became Primerica Financial Services, and was later bought out by Citigroup in 1989. He retired from the business in 2001, and sold half of his business to his son and the other half to Lynn Webb, a senior national sales director.

Later in his life, Turley resided in Blue Ridge, Georgia, and had a winter home on Marco Island, Florida. Turley's hobby was real estate. He bought and sold many homes on Marco Island, including a 13,500 square feet (1,250 m^{2}) home he built that was locally referred to as "Turley Mansion" and "Turley Castle". In total, Turley and his wife bought and sold 27 houses on Marco Island and in Naples, Florida.

Turley made an appearance on It's News to Me, a current events-based game show hosted by Walter Cronkite. He was mentioned in a song called "St. Louis Browns" by Skip Battin, who was the bass guitarist of The Byrds and the New Riders of the Purple Sage. In the lyrics, Battin describes Turley as a "no-hit pitcher" who "got too surly" and who was "traded...too early".

Turley's uncle, Ralph, also played professional baseball. The Yankees signed Ralph Turley in 1949 when they meant to sign Bob, and released Ralph when they discovered he was the "wrong Turley". Nik Turley, a Yankees prospect, identified Bob Turley as a "distant relative".

=== Death ===
Turley lived in Alpharetta, Georgia, for the last two years of his life. He died on March 30, 2013, in hospice care at Lenbrook, a retirement community in Atlanta at age 82 from liver cancer. Turley was cremated in Duluth, Georgia.

== See also ==
- List of Major League Baseball annual strikeout leaders
- List of Major League Baseball annual wins leaders

Sporting positions
Preceded by Harry Dorish	Boston Red Sox Pitching Coach; 1964	Succeeded by Mace Brown
