= Belleville Stags =

- 1947–1949; Belleville, Illinois

Minor league affiliations
- Class: Class D (1947–1949)
- League: Illinois State League (1947–1948); Mississippi–Ohio Valley League (1949)

Major league affiliations
- Team: St. Louis Browns (1947–1948); New York Yankees (1949)

Minor league titles
- League titles (1): 1947

Team data
- Ballpark: Belleville Athletic Field/Stag Park (1947–1949)

The Belleville Stags were a minor league baseball team based in Belleville, Illinois. In 1947 and 1948, the Stags played as members of the Class D level Illinois State League and remained a franchise when the league changed names to the Mississippi–Ohio Valley League in 1949, which later evolved to become today's Midwest League. Winners of the 1947 league championship, the Stags were named and supported by their namesake, Stag Beer. The Stags were a minor league affiliate of the St. Louis Browns in 1947 and 1948 and New York Yankees in 1949. Belleville hosted home minor league games at the Belleville Athletic Field, also called "Stag Park" in the era.

== History ==
Minor league baseball in Belleville, Illinois began in 1947, when the Belleville Stags became a charter member of the Class D level Illinois State League. In 1947 league play, the Stags joined the Centralia Cubs, Mattoon White Sox, Marion Indians, Mount Vernon Braves, and West Frankfort Cardinals as charter members of the six–team Illinois State League. All the league teams were new franchises.

The use of the "Stags" moniker by Belleville was in reference to the team being sponsored by Stag Beer. Their home ballpark, Belleville Athletic Field, was also referred to as "Stag Park" while the team played there.

In their first season of play, the 1947 Belleville Stags won the Illinois State League championship in the first season of the Class D level league. The Stags, playing as a minor league affiliate of the St. Louis Browns, finished the regular season with a 75–37 record to place first in the standings under manager Walter DeFreitas. The league had no playoffs as Belleville finished 15.0 games ahead of the second place Centralia Cubs in the final standings. Belleville had season home attendance of 18,539, playing home games at Belleville Athletic Field.

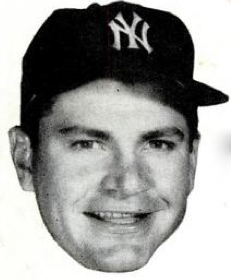
(1959) Bob Turley, New York Yankees.Turley had a 9–3 record for Bellville in 1948. Turley won the 1958 Cy Young Award.

Belleville continued play in the 1948 Illinois State League. The Stags finished with a record of 51–67 to place fifth in the standings under managers Gerald Nemitz and Shan Deniston. Belleville finished 33.0 games behind the first place West Frankfort Cardinals in the final standings of the six–team league. Belleville drew 6,085 fans for the season. 1958 Cy Young Award winner and World Series MVP Bob Turley pitched for the 1948 Belleville Stags, pitching to a 9–3 record.

Belleville played their final season in 1949. The Stags continued play as the Illinois State League changed names to become the Class D level Mississippi–Ohio Valley League. The name change occurred after the Paducah Chiefs franchise replaced the Marion Indians in the six–team league. The Belleville Stags became an affiliate of the New York Yankees and finished last in the league standings. The Stags finished with a record of 43–76, playing under managers Lee Mueller, Joseph Yurkovich, Addie Nesbit and Malcolm Mick. Belleville's Bunny Mick led the league in batting average, hitting .354. Belleville finished 22.0 games behind the first place Centralia Cubs. After drawing 13,500 for the 1949 season, Belleville permanently folded after the 1949 season and were replaced in the 1950 Mississippi–Ohio Valley League by the Vincennes Velvets.

The "Stags" had played as an independent local team before the minor league team, and they reformed to play as a local independent team into the 1950s after the demise of the professional franchise.

Today, the "Belleville Stags" moniker has been adopted by a local "vintage" baseball team, members of the Vintage Baseball Association.

Belleville, Illinois has not hosted another minor league team.

== The ballpark ==
The Belleville Stags played home games at the Belleville Athletic Field. As the team was sponsored by Stag Beer, the ballpark was also referred to as "Stag Park." The ballpark was located at 901 South Illinois Street at Cleveland Avenue (Route 159 & IL 13) in Belleville, Illinois. Today, the site houses an auto dealership.

== Timeline ==
Year(s)	# Yrs.	Team	Level	League	Affiliate	Ballpark
1947–1948	2	Belleville Stags	Class D	Illinois State League	St. Louis Browns	Belleville Athletic Field
1949	1	Belleville Stags	Class D	Mississippi–Ohio Valley League	New York Yankees	Belleville Athletic Field

== Year–by–year records ==
Year	Record	Finish	Attendance	Manager	Playoffs/Notes
1947	75–37	1st	18,539	Walter DeFreitas	League champions
1948	51–67	5th	6,085	Gerald Nemitz / Shan Deniston	Did not qualify
1949	43–76	6th	13,500	Lee Mueller / Joseph Yurkovich / Addie Nesbit / Malcolm Mick	Did not qualify

== Notable alumni ==
- Mike Blyzka (1948)
- John Gabler (1949)
- Frank Saucier (1948)
- Bob Turley (1948) 3 x MLB All-Star; 1958 World Series MVP; 1958 Cy Young Award
- Bud Thomas (1947)
- Jack Urban (1949)

== See also ==
- Belleville Stags players
