= Rhythm and Booms =

Annual fireworks show in Madison, Wisconsin

Coordinates: 43.131123°N 89.366827°W

Rhythm and Booms was an annual summer fireworks show in Madison, Wisconsin.

== History ==
The show was held on the last Saturday in June. From its inception in 1993 through 2013 the event was held at Warner Park. Upwards of 200,000 people regularly attended the celebration.

=== Location change ===
In 2014, the fireworks display moved from Warner Park to downtown Madison. Environmental concerns, nimbyism, and cost reduction were all cited by city officials as reasons for the move.

=== Demise ===
In 2015, after 22 years, the celebration was cancelled by event organizers. Rhythm and Booms was replaced by a new event, Shake the Lake, which was also later cancelled.

== Fireworks ==
30 minutes of fireworks were launched from Warner park on Madison’s north side.

== Production ==
The show was owned and operated by a 501(c)(3) non-profit organization, Madison Festivals, Inc. Some proceeds from Rhythm & Booms went to local charities, including American Family Children's Hospital.
