= Buddy Kerr =

American baseball player (1922-2006)

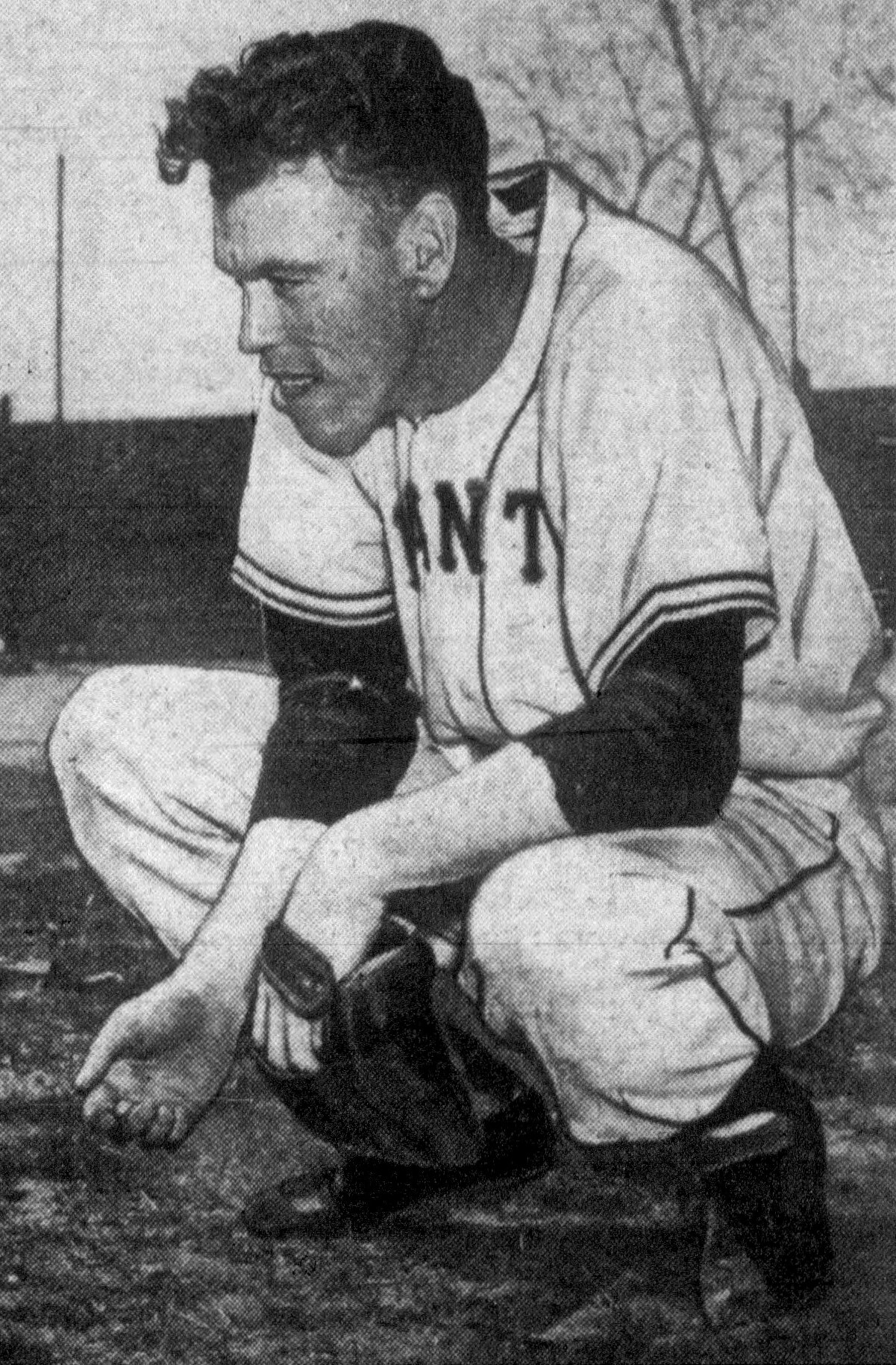
- Kerr in 1949
- Shortstop
- Born: November 6, 1922; Astoria, New York, U.S.
- Died: November 7, 2006 (aged 84); New York, New York, U.S.
- Batted: Right Threw: Right

MLB debut
- September 8, 1943, for the New York Giants

Last MLB appearance
- September 30, 1951, for the Boston Braves

MLB statistics
- Batting average: .249
- Home runs: 31
- Runs batted in: 333
- Stats at Baseball Reference

Teams
- New York Giants (1943–1949); Boston Braves (1950–1951)

Career highlights and awards
- All-Star (1948)

John Joseph "Buddy" Kerr (November 6, 1922 – November 7, 2006) was an American shortstop in Major League Baseball. From 1943 through 1951, Kerr played for the New York Giants (1943–1949) and Boston Braves (1950–1951). A native of Astoria, New York, he batted and threw right-handed.

Despite the fact that he hit a home run in his first major league at-bat on September 8 of his debut season, Kerr was known mostly as a slick fielder with a very light bat. He led National League shortstops in assists, putouts, and double plays in 1945, and achieved a top .982 fielding average in 1946. From 1946 to 1947, he played 68 consecutive games without committing an error, which was a major league record that would last until 1989. His most productive offensive season came in 1947, when he recorded a career-high .287 average. An All-Star in 1948, he also received minor consideration in the National League MVP voting in 1945 and 1946.

In a nine-season career, Kerr was a .249 hitter with 31 home runs and 333 runs batted in in 1067 games played.

== Professional career ==
The Giants signed Buddy Kerr out of George Washington High School in New York City. The team assigned Kerr to the Fort Smith Giants of the Western Association. As an 18 year old rookie, Kerr appeared in 102 games and batted over .300. He was promoted to Jersey City of the International League, where he'd spent the next two seasons before joining the Giants as the backup to Billy Jurges. At 20 years old, Kerr was the youngest player on the roster. However in his first season in the major leagues, Kerr appeared in 27 games and batted a respectable .285. In 1944, Giants player/manager Mel Ott named Kerr the starting shortstop and moved the veteran Jurges to third base. Kerr remained the regular shortstop for the Giants until he was traded to the Boston Braves ahead of the 1950 season, along with Willard Marshall and Sid Gordon, for Alvin Dark and Eddie Stanky. Kerr only played a couple of season in Boston, splitting his second season between shortstop and second base. He was released at the end of the 1951 season, and signed with the Philadelphia Phillies and was assigned to their minor league affiliate in Baltimore.

In 1953, he returned to the Braves, who by this time had relocated to Milwaukee and was assigned to the Toledo Sox, their top minor league affiliate. Kerr retired as an active player after playing one season for the Toronto Maple Leafs of the International League. Kerr later became a manager and made a few appearances as a player.

In 1958, Kerr was the manager of the Michigan City White Caps of the Midwest League. One of the players on that team was a young pitcher who had just been signed from the Dominican Republic, Juan Marichal. In his autobiography, My Journey From The Dominican Republic to Cooperstown, Marichal praised Kerr, writing that Kerr did everything he could to make Marichal feel less homesick. In the book, Marichal also related several stories in which Kerr defended him from racists and would refuse to eat at places that would not allow Marichal and Jose Tartabull, who had fled Cuba, to dine there.

Kerr remained with the Giants managing their minor league affiliates until 1963, when he was dismissed at the conclusion of the 1963 season, in which he had led the Springfield Giants of the Double-A Eastern League to a 72-68 record, which was good enough for a third place finish.

Kerr worked for the New York Mets from 1975 through 2000 as a special assignment scout. He died in New York City after a short illness, one day after his 84th birthday.

== See also ==
- List of Major League Baseball players with a home run in their first major league at bat
