= Marion Indians =

- 1947–1948; Marion, Illinois

Minor league affiliations
- Class: Class D (1947–1948)
- League: Illinois State League (1947–1948)

Major league affiliations
- Team: Cleveland Indians (1947)

Minor league titles
- League titles (0): None
- Wild card berths (1): 1948

Team data
- Name: Marion Indians (1947) Marion No-Names (1948)
- Ballpark: Marion City Park (Ray Fosse Park) (1947–1948)

The Marion Indians were a minor league baseball team based in Marion, Illinois. Marion held membership in the Class D level Illinois State League, which evolved into today's Midwest League. Hosting home games at Marion City Park (called Ray Fosse Park today), the Marion Indians were a minor league affiliate of the Cleveland Indians in 1947. Marion with no affiliation in 1948, and with one team in the league supported by the Cleveland Indians in Mattoon, Illinois. John Rackaway of the Mount Vernon Register-News Newspaper called the Marion team the No-Names in an early meeting in 1948, and the No-Names name stuck.

== History ==
Minor league baseball began in Marion, Illinois in 1947. The Marion Indians franchise was formed, and the team joined the Belleville Stags, Centralia Cubs, Mattoon White Sox, Mount Vernon Braves, and West Frankfort Cardinals as new franchises and charter members of the Illinois State League.

An Illinois State League franchise was originally awarded to the city of Murphysboro, Illinois. The Murphysboro franchise moved to Marion, Illinois shortly before Illinois State League play began. The Marion Indians were formed as a minor league affiliate of the Cleveland Indians.

In their first season of play, the Illinois State League played a split–season schedule. The Marion Indians placed third in the 1947 overall Illinois State League final standings. With record of 55–56, playing the season under manager Melvin Ivy, the Indians finished 19.5 games behind the champion Belleville Stags. Marion placed fourth in the first–half standings with a 22–30 record and second in the second–half standings with a 33–26 record. Belleville won both half seasons and no playoffs were held as a result.

The Marion Indians played their final season in 1948 and qualified for the playoffs. Marion again placed third in the 1948 Illinois State League, with a 53–56 regular season record. In the final standings, Marion finished 31.5 games behind the first place West Frankfort Cardinals, with Melvin Ivy returning as manager. In the first round of the playoffs, the West Frankfort Cardinals defeated Marion 3 games to 1

After the 1948 season, the franchise relocated. The Marion franchise moved to Paducah, Kentucky to become the Paducah Chiefs in 1949. After the Marion relocation into the State of Kentucky, the Illinois State League changed its name to the Mississippi–Ohio Valley League in 1949. The Mississippi–Ohio Valley League became known as the Midwest League in 1956.

In 2007, the Southern Illinois Miners became members of the Independent level Frontier League and became the first professional team hosted in Marion since the Indians relocated in 1948, a span of 59 seasons.

== The ballpark ==
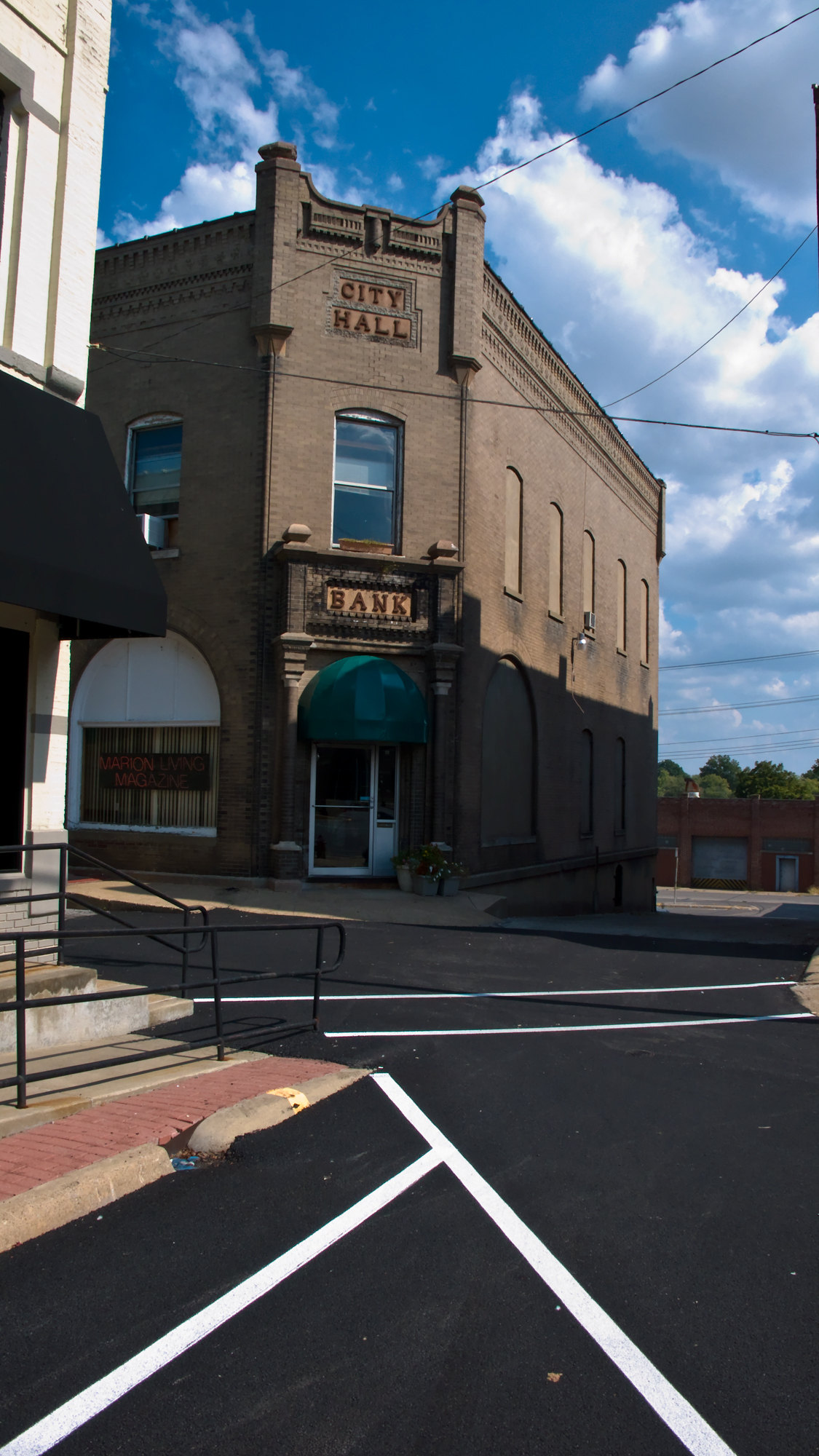
(2007) Marion, Illinois

The Marion Indians were noted to have played minor league home games at Marion City Park. Still in use today, the park is known as Ray Fosse Park, after Marion native and All-Star catcher Ray Fosse. The park has ballfields, a golf course and a municipal swimming pool. Ray Fosse Park is located at 500 East Deyoung Street in Marion, Illinois.

== Timeline ==
Year(s)	# Yrs.	Team	Level	League	Affiliate	Ballpark
1947	1	Marion Indians	Class D	Illinois State League	Cleveland Indians	Marion City Park
1948	1	Marion No-Names	Class D	Illinois State League	None	Marion City Park

== Year–by–year records ==
Year	Record	Finish	Attendance	Manager	Playoffs/Notes
1947	55–56	3rd	36,705	Melvin Ivy	No playoffs held
1948	53–56	3rd	13,697	Melvin Ivy	Lost 1st round

== Notable alumni ==
- Roy Hawes (1947)
- Marion Indians players
