= Madison Black Wolf =

- 1996–2000; Madison, Wisconsin

Minor league affiliations
- Previous classes: Independent (1996-2000)
- League: Northern League (1996-2000)
- Division: East Division

Team data
- Previous names: Madison Black Wolf (1996-2000)
- Previous parks: Warner Park (1996-2000)

The Madison Black Wolf was a Northern League baseball club located in Madison, Wisconsin, from 1996 to 2000. They played their home games at Warner Park which was then nicknamed "The Wolf Den". The club was owned by Madison Baseball, LLC, which folded operations following the 2000 season. The club moved then to Lincoln, Nebraska, where it is known as the Lincoln Saltdogs.

The Black Wolf made the playoffs in their inaugural season, losing to the St. Paul Saints in the first round. They followed that up with four straight losing seasons. They finished their five-year run in Madison with a 191–235 record, a .448 winning percentage.

Jimmy Buffett was part owner of the team when it started its first season in 1996.
