= Trish O'Kane =

American environmental educator, academic and investigative journalist

- Other name: Patricia O'Kane
- Education: University of Wisconsin-Madison, University of Southern California, London School of Economics
- Occupations: environmental educator, academic and investigative journalist
- Employer: University of Vermont
- Notable work: Birding to Change the World
- Website: https://trishokane.org/

Trish O'Kane is an American environmental educator and academic, and former international investigative journalist.

As of 2026, O'Kane is a senior lecturer in the Rubenstein School of Environment and Natural Resources at the University of Vermont.

== Early life and education ==
O'Kane was born in Orange County, California to Irish parents. She was brought up in California and graduated from El Modena High School.

She attended the University of Southern California, receiving her BA in Spanish and Latin American Studies in 1985 and an MA in International Journalism in 1988.

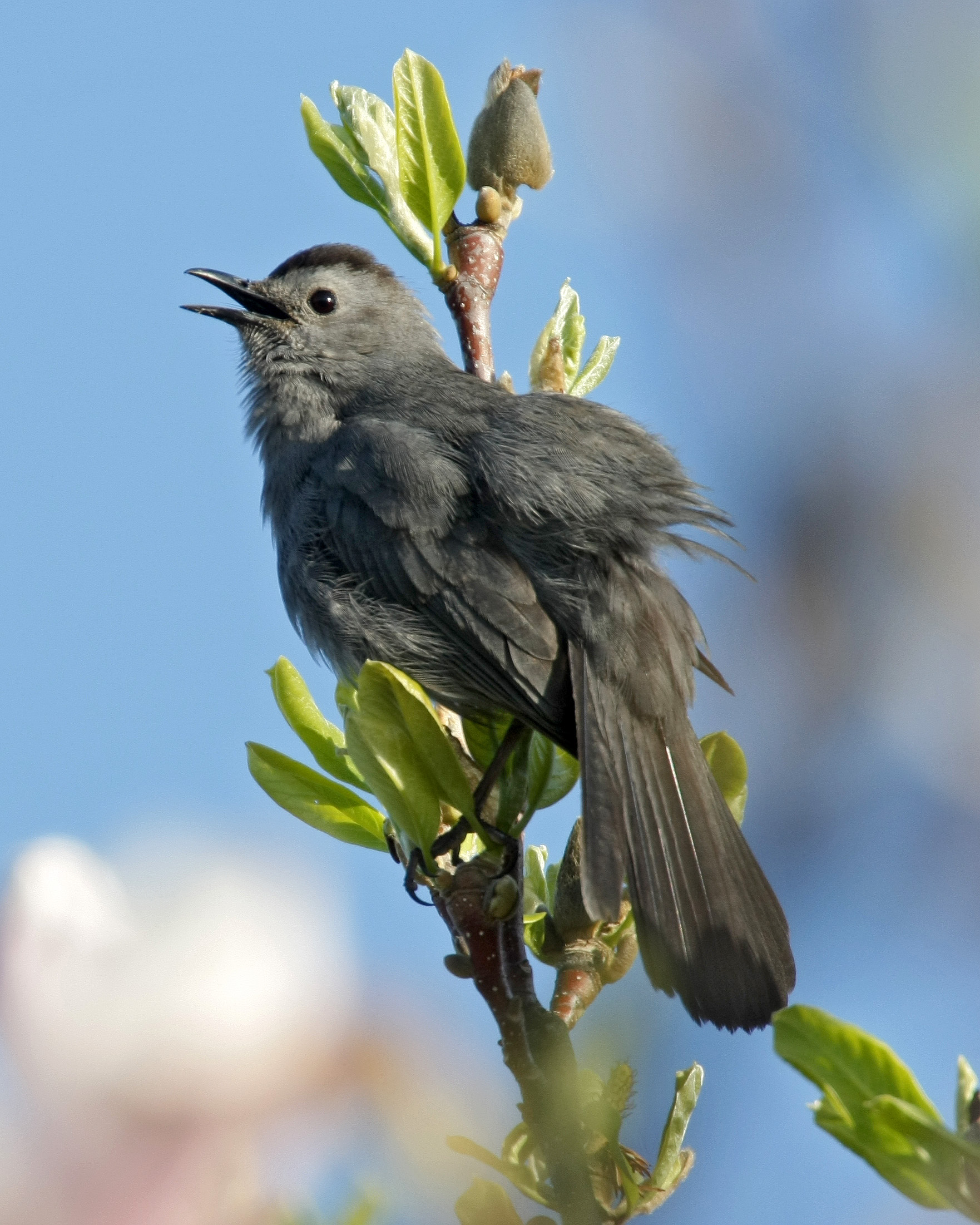
A gray catbird (Dumatella carolinensis) in Madison, Wisconsin

== Career ==
After a career in international investigative journalism focusing on human rights issues in Central America and hate crimes in Alabama, she taught journalism Auburn University and Loyola University in the early 2000s. O'Kane was living in New Orleans when Hurricane Katrina destroyed her home.

In 2010, O'Kane moved to Madison, Wisconsin where she pursued a PhD in Environmental Studies, which she received in 2015. Her dissertation, supervised by Jack Kloppenburg and entitled, Nesting in the City: Birds, Children and a City Park as Teachers of Environmental Literacy, was based on an environmental education and action plan to protect the urban wetland and bird habitat in Warner Park, including starting a local nonprofit advocacy group, Wild Warner and starting a birding mentoring programme with a local middle school.

As part of her PhD research, she also used geolocation to study the migration patterns of catbirds (Dumetella carolinensis) which documented that some birds return to Warner Park after wintering in northern Guatemala or southern Mexico.

=== Birding to Change the World ===
O'Kane's 2025 book, Birding to Change the World: An Uplifting Memoir that Explores what Birds Can Teach us about Life, describes her PhD research and career change from journalist to environmental educator and academic.

Reviewers noted that her 2025 memoir is a "thoroughly researched" book, an inspiring and beautiful tribute to local activism that details the tangible was that birds and people depend on each other. Trish O'Kane is described as a "woman with a cause" who has written a book that is "at once a natural history, a call for social change, and a memoir about repairing the world" and which offers "a refreshingly different perspective to the challenges of environmental education and advocacy for the value of an urban park and access to nature for local people."

== Awards ==
O'Kane has received awards for her teaching, including the 2018 Kroepsch-Maurice Excellence in Teaching Award and the 2025/26 Outstanding Part-Time Faculty Teaching Award, both from the University of Vermont.

She also won the 2022 UW-Madison Nelson Institute Rising Star Alumni Award for making a significant difference in the world after graduating from UW-Madison.

== Publications ==
- Trish O'Kane (2025). Birding to Change the World: An Uplifting Memoir that Explores what Birds Can Teach us about Life. Harper Collins. ISBN 978-0-06-322316-5.
- O'Kane, Patricia (2015). Nesting in the City: Birds, Children and a City Park as Teachers of Environmental Literacy (Thesis). University of Wisconsin–Madison. Wikidata Q141100438.
