= Warner Park =

Park in Madison, Wisconsin, United States

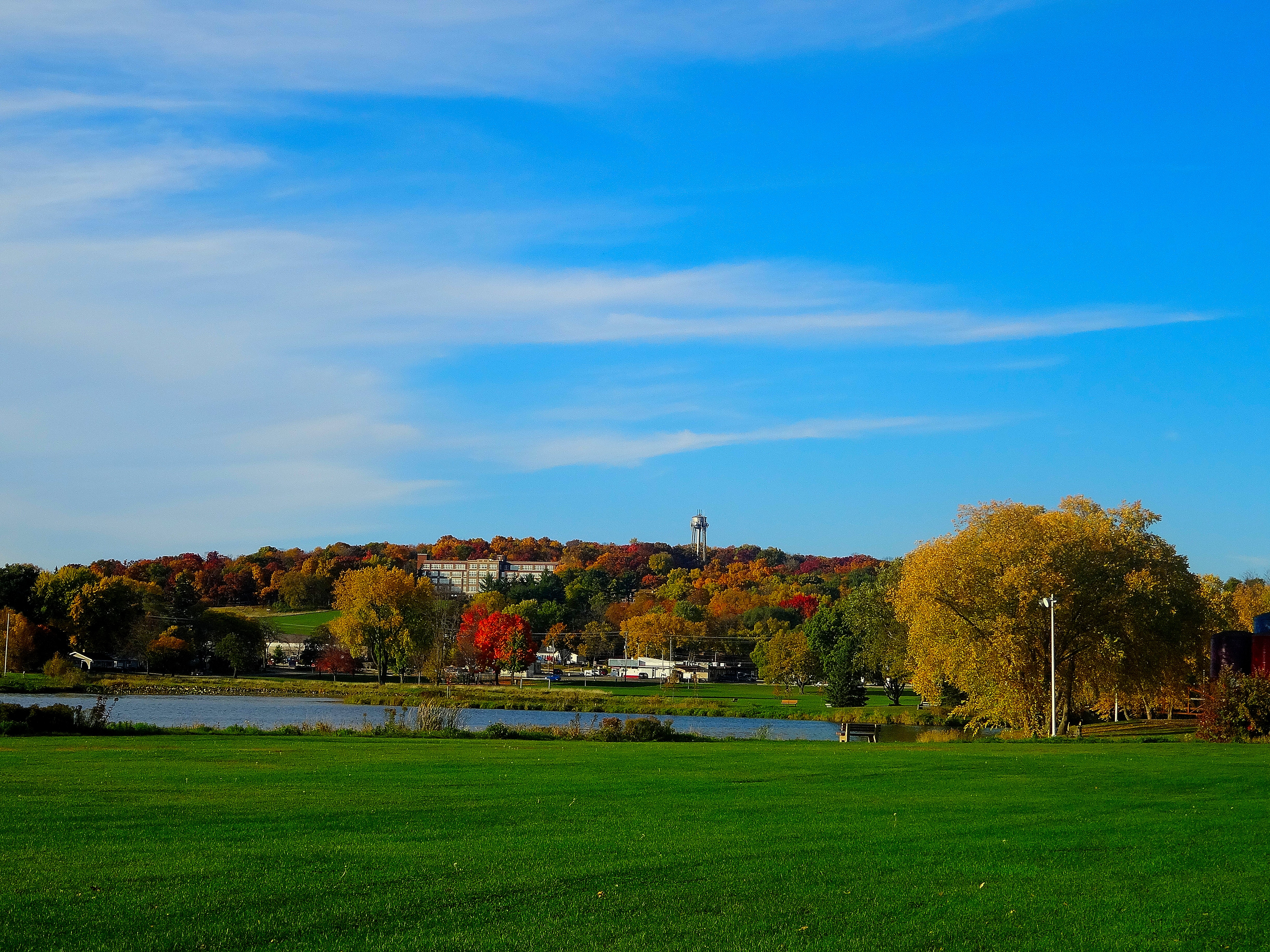
- The park in 2014

- Location within Wisconsin
- Interactive map of Warner Park
- Type: Municipal park
- Location: Madison, Wisconsin, United States
- Coordinates: 43°7′52″N 89°22′01″W
- Area: 213.49 acres (86.40 ha)
- Created: 1898
- Founder: Madison Park and Pleasure Drive Association
- Operator: City of Madison
- Open: All year

Warner Park is a municipal park and ballpark on the northeast side of Madison, Wisconsin near Lake Mendota.

Warner Park is on land that was originally marsh, woodland and prairie and was inhabited by indigenous people. As one of the last parts sponsored and purchased by the Madison Park and Pleasure Drive Association (MPPDA), it is now Madison's largest urban park. The designated wetlands of Warner Park are part of the Yahara River watershed and are closely connected to Lake Mendota. In the 2010s, a group of concerned neighbors, including Jack Hurst and Trish O'Kane, formed Wild Warner to protect the natural areas of the park which are an important habitat for native fish, plants and migrating birds.

The park has football fields. One field was formerly the home of the Madison Mustangs, a semi-professional football team that played in the Central States Football League in the 1960s and 1970s.

The park contains a 9-foot-tall metal replica of the Statue of Liberty (Liberty Enlightening the World), built in 1950.

== Baseball stadium ==
Warner Park
- "The Wolf Den" "The Duck Pond"
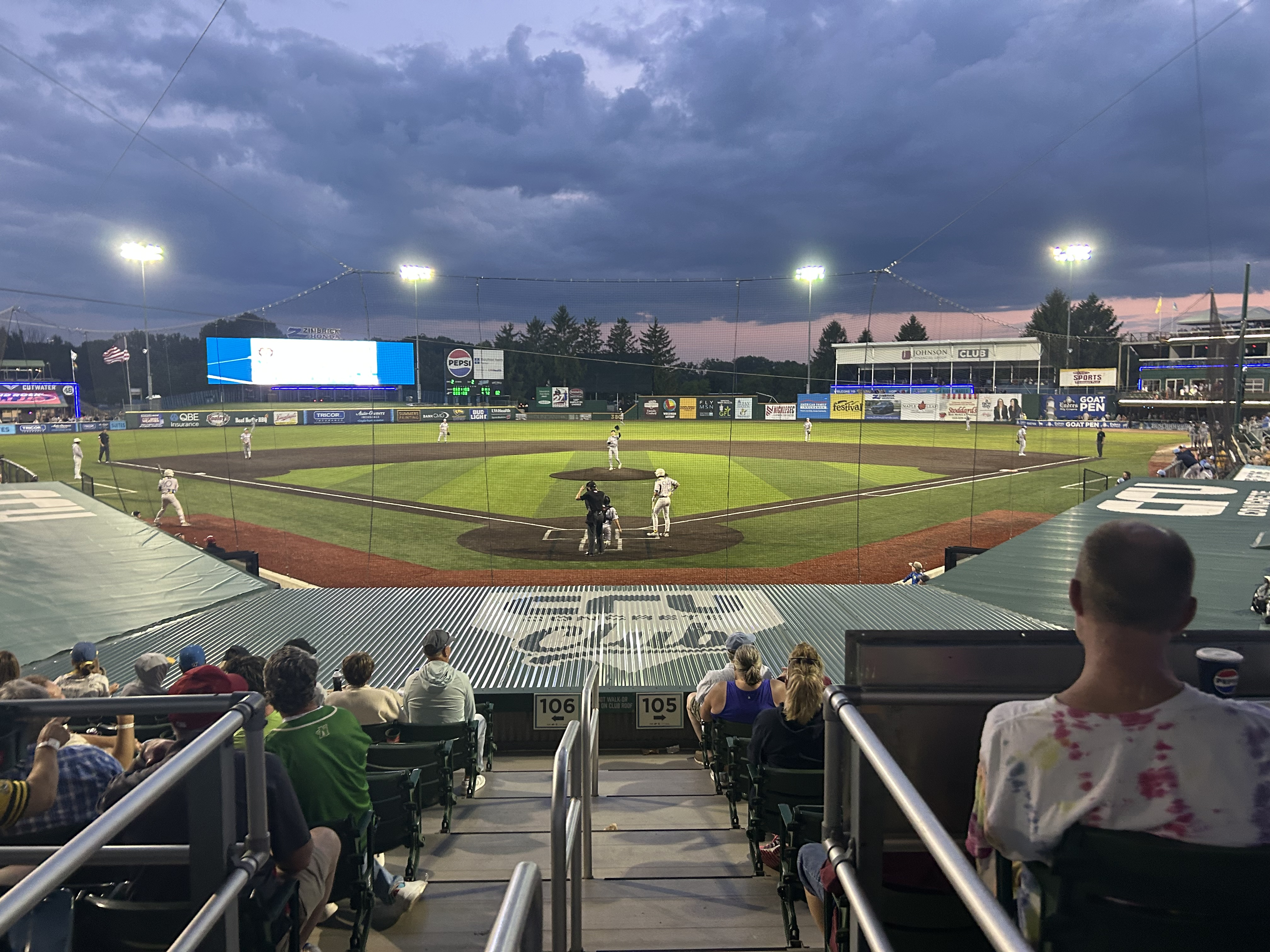
- The ballpark in 2026

- Location within Wisconsin
- Interactive map of Warner Park
- Owner: City of Madison
- Capacity: 6,750
- Surface: Artificial Turf
- Scoreboard: 1,800 square feet (170 m^{2})
- Record attendance: 10,061 (June 12, 2004)
- Field size: Left field – 308 1/3 ft (94.0 m); Left-center – 365 ft (111.3 m); Center field – 380 ft (115.8 m); Right-center – 365 ft (111.3 m); Right field – 295 2/3 ft (90.1 m)
- Public transit: Metro Transit

Construction
- Opened: 1982
- Renovated: 2011, 2024

Tenants
- Madison Muskies (MWL) 1982–1993; Madison Hatters (MWL) 1994; Madison Black Wolf (Northern) 1996–2000; Madison Mallards (NWL) 2001–present Madison Night Mares (NWL) 2024–present Madison East High School baseball Madison LaFollette High School baseball Edgewood High School baseball

Since 2001, Warner Park has been the home to the Madison Mallards, a member of the Northwoods League (baseball). In 2024, the Madison Night Mares, a women's collegiate softball team in the Northwoods League, joined the Mallards playing their home games at Warner Park. Its stadium, nicknamed the "Duck Pond," was built in 1982 for the now-defunct Madison Muskies and has a capacity of 6,750. The Madison Hatters used the stadium in 1994 as did the Madison Black Wolf from 1996-2000. Today it hosts the Madison East High School and Madison La Follette High School baseball teams.

== See also ==
- Replicas of the Statue of Liberty
