= Michigan City White Caps =

- 1956–1959; Michigan City, Indiana

Minor league affiliations
- Class: Class D (1956–1959)
- League: Midwest League (1956–1959)

Major league affiliations
- Team: San Francisco Giants (1958–1959); New York Giants (1956–1957)

Minor league titles
- Class titles: None

Team data
- Name: Michigan City White Caps (1956–1959)
- Ballpark: Ames Field

The Michigan City White Caps were a minor league baseball team based in Michigan City, Indiana from 1956 to 1959. The White Caps were a member of the Class C Midwest League (1956–1959).

Baseball Hall of Fame member Juan Marichal played for the 1958 Michigan City White Caps.

== History ==
The franchise had played in Hannibal, Missouri as the Hannibal Stags, before moving to Michigan City in 1956. The Michigan City White Caps became a become a charter member of the newly named Midwest League in 1956.

The White Caps were affiliated with the Giants, who played in New York from 1956 to 1957 and San Francisco from 1958 to 1959. The Michigan City franchise folded after the 1959 Midwest League season. The nickname name was restored to the region when today's West Michigan Whitecaps began play in the 1994 Midwest League.

Baseball Hall of Fame Inductee Juan Marichal pitched for Michigan City in 1958. Marichal captured the Midwest League Pitcher of the Year award, after a 21–8 record, 1.87 ERA and 246 strikeouts.

On August 12, 1957 Bobby Bolin threw a no-hitter against the Dubuque Packers, in an 11–0 victory.

During the White Caps era, Michigan City was home to the Jaymar-Ruby Corporation (1922–2009), Jaymar-Rubs produced the then-popular Sansabelt dress pants, among other apparel. As a perk, White Caps players were given free dress pants by the company. Allegedly, Juan Marichal did not like the pants and gave them away.

== The ballpark ==
The White Caps played at Ames Field. The park was constructed in 1939 and demolished in 1995. Today, the Michigan City High School football field occupies the site. The address is 2501 Franklin Street, Michigan City, Indiana.

== Notable alumni ==
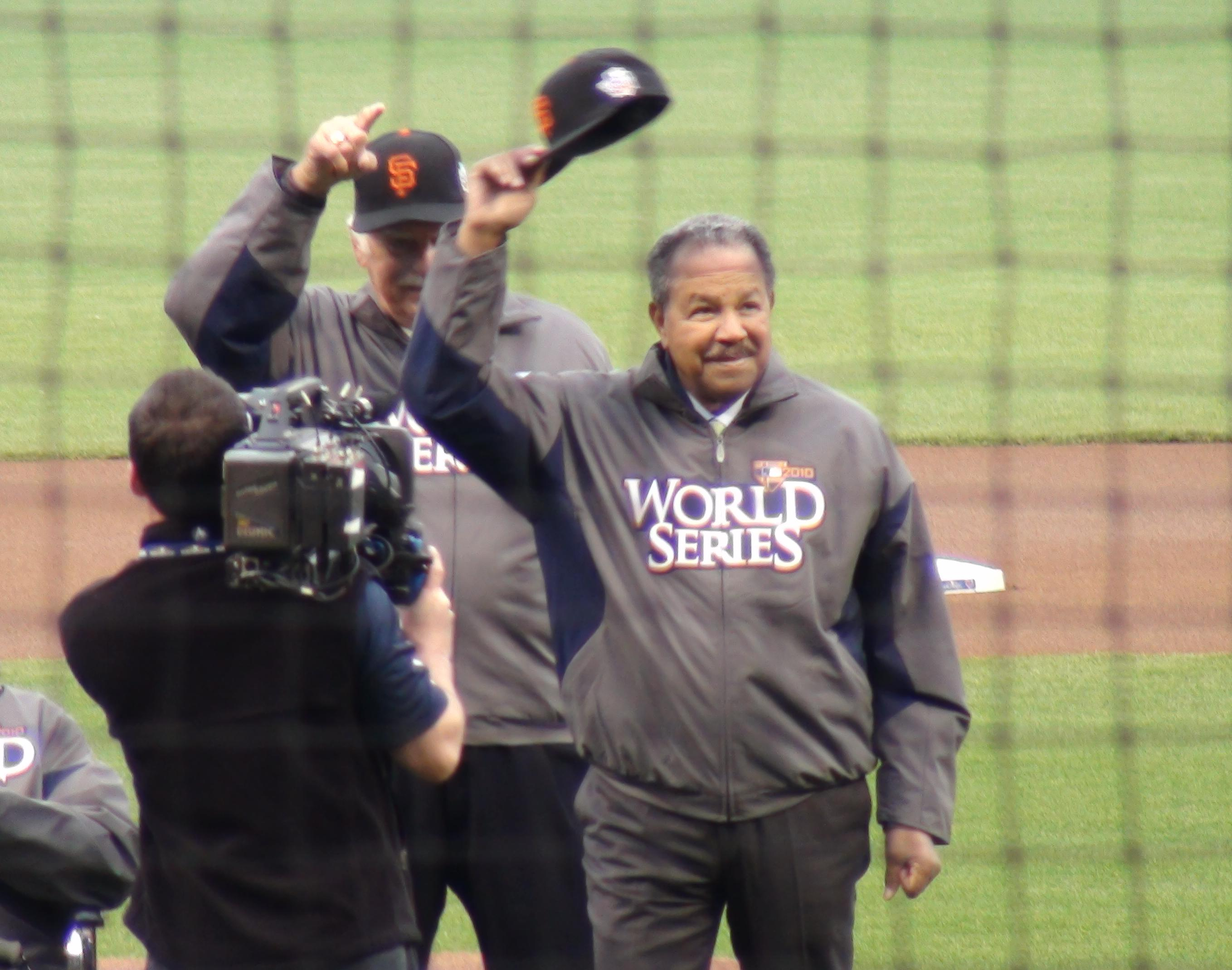
Juan Marichal 2010

Hall of Fame Alumni

- Juan Marichal (1958) Inducted, 1983

Notable Alumni

- Buddy Kerr (1958–1959, MGR) MLB All-Star
- Rick Joseph (1959)
- Wayne Schurr (1959)
- Jose Tartabull (1958–1959) Father of Danny Tartabull
- Matty Alou (1957) 2x MLB All-Star; 1966 NL Batting Champion
- Bobby Bolin (1957)
- Bob Farley (1957)
- Manny Mota (1957) MLB All-Star
- John Orsino (1957)

== Year-by-year record ==
Year	Record	Finish	Manager
1956	55–71	7th	Allan Shinn
1957	68–57	4th	Richard Klaus
1958	69–55	2nd	Buddy Kerr
1959	51–74	8th	Buddy Kerr
