= Midwest League =

American Minor League baseball league

- Current season, competition or edition: 2025 Midwest League season
- Formerly: Mississippi-Ohio Valley League (1949–1955); Illinois State League (1947–1948)
- Classification: High-A (2021–present); Class A (1963–2020); Class D (1947–1962)
- Sport: Baseball
- Founded: 1947 (79 years ago)
- No. of teams: 12
- Country: United States
- Most recent champion: Quad Cities River Bandits (2026)
- Most titles: Wisconsin Timber Rattlers, Lansing Lugnuts, and Quad Cities River Bandits (9)

The Midwest League is a Minor League Baseball league established in 1947 and based in the Midwestern United States. A Class A league for most of its history, the league was promoted to High-A as part of Major League Baseball's 2021 reorganization of the minor leagues.

The Midwest League began as the Illinois State League (1947–1948) and then became the Mississippi–Ohio Valley League (1949–1955). In 1956, the Mississippi–Ohio Valley League was renamed the Midwest League. The circuit temporarily operated for the 2021 season as the High-A Central before reassuming its original moniker in 2022.

The Lansing Lugnuts, Wisconsin Timber Rattlers, and Quad Cities River Bandits are tied for the most Midwest League championships, with nine each.

== History ==
The Midwest League directly evolved from two earlier leagues in the region. In 1947, the Class D Illinois State League (ISL) began operation with six Illinois teams: the Belleville Stags, Centralia Cubs, Marion Indians, Mattoon Indians, Mount Vernon Braves, and West Frankfort Cardinals. In 1949, the ISL changed its name to the Mississippi–Ohio Valley League after Marion moved their franchise to Kentucky and became the Paducah Chiefs. In 1954, the Mississippi-Ohio Valley League expanded, adding teams in Clinton and Dubuque, Iowa. The Mississippi-Ohio Valley League was then renamed Midwest League in 1956. Like its predecessors, it was a Class D league, the lowest level of organized baseball at the time (equivalent to a Rookie-level league today).

The original teams in 1956, the first year of Midwest League play, were: Clinton Pirates, Decatur Commodores, Dubuque Packers, Kokomo Dodgers, Lafayette Red Sox, Mattoon Phillies, Michigan City White Caps and the Paris Lakers. Mattoon is the oldest franchise in the MWL, evolving into today's Fort Wayne TinCaps, while Clinton is the oldest MWL locale.

In 1960, the Davenport Braves joined the league as an expansion team. In 1962, Appleton, Burlington, and Cedar Rapids joined the Midwest League from the Illinois-Indiana-Iowa League which folded operations when those franchises switched leagues. All those franchised remain in the league today. In 1963, the Midwest League, along with all other Class B, C, and D leagues, was designated as a Class A league after the minor league classification structure was reorganized.

The 1975 Waterloo Royals, led by future MLB All-Stars Willie Wilson and Dan Quisenberry, are ranked #60 on MiLB.com's Top 100 Teams. The Royals finished the season 93–35.

In 1976, the Midwest League contracted from ten teams to eight, as franchises in Danville and Dubuque were eliminated. In 1982, the league expanded from 8 to 12 teams, adding the Beloit Brewers, the Danville Suns, the Madison Muskies, and the Springfield Cardinals. The Peoria Suns relocated from Danville in 1983, and acquired their current name, Peoria Chiefs, the following year. In 1988, the league began splitting its season into two halves and expanded from 12 to 14 teams, with the addition of franchises in South Bend, Indiana, and Rockford, Illinois. During the 1990s several teams changed cities as Major League Baseball placed higher standards on minor league baseball facilities; franchises in smaller cities were sold to new owners who moved those teams to new ballparks in larger cities. Kenosha, Madison, Rockford, Springfield, Waterloo, and Wausau lost teams during this decade while Battle Creek, Dayton, Fort Wayne, Grand Rapids (West Michigan), Kane County, and Lansing gained teams.

The 1978 Appleton Foxes are ranked #93 on the Top-100 All Time teams by MiLB.com. Led by future Cy Young Award winner LaMarr Hoyt, the team finished 97–40. Harry Chappas, Ross Baumgarten and Britt Burns were all called up to the parent Chicago White Sox at the conclusion of the MWL season. The 97 wins by the Foxes remains a Midwest League record.

The Fort Wayne TinCaps are the oldest franchise in the league, having begun as the Mattoon Indians in 1947 and playing in Keokuk, Iowa; Wisconsin Rapids, Wisconsin; and Kenosha, Wisconsin, before moving to Fort Wayne, Indiana, in 1993. The Clinton LumberKings have been in one city longer than any Midwest League team, having called Clinton, Iowa, home since 1954.

The Southwest Michigan Devil Rays moved to Midland, Michigan, and became the Great Lakes Loons prior to the 2007 season.

On September 2, 2008, Minor League Baseball announced that two teams would transfer from the fellow Class A South Atlantic League to the Midwest League: the Lake County Captains (an affiliate of the Cleveland Indians playing in Eastlake, Ohio) and the Bowling Green Hot Rods (an affiliate of the Tampa Bay Rays playing in Bowling Green, Kentucky).

The start of the 2020 season was postponed due to the COVID-19 pandemic before ultimately being cancelled on June 30.

As part of Major League Baseball's 2021 reorganization of the minor leagues, the Midwest League was promoted to High-A (formerly Class A Advanced), reduced to 12 teams, and temporarily renamed the "High-A Central" for the 2021 season. Following MLB's acquisition of the rights to the names of the historical minor leagues, the High-A Central was renamed the Midwest League effective with the 2022 season.

== Current teams ==
Division	Team	MLB affiliation	City	Stadium	Capacity
East	Dayton Dragons	Cincinnati Reds	Dayton, Ohio	Day Air Ballpark	7,230
East	Fort Wayne TinCaps	San Diego Padres	Fort Wayne, Indiana	Parkview Field	8,100
East	Great Lakes Loons	Los Angeles Dodgers	Midland, Michigan	Dow Diamond	5,200
East	Lake County Captains	Cleveland Guardians	Eastlake, Ohio	Classic Auto Group Park	7,273
East	Lansing Lugnuts	Athletics	Lansing, Michigan	Jackson Field	9,500
East	West Michigan Whitecaps	Detroit Tigers	Comstock Park, Michigan	LMCU Ballpark	9,281
West	Beloit Sky Carp	Miami Marlins	Beloit, Wisconsin	ABC Supply Stadium	3,850
West	Cedar Rapids Kernels	Minnesota Twins	Cedar Rapids, Iowa	Veterans Memorial Stadium	5,300
West	Peoria Chiefs	St. Louis Cardinals	Peoria, Illinois	Dozer Park	8,500
West	Quad Cities River Bandits	Kansas City Royals	Davenport, Iowa	Modern Woodmen Park	7,140
West	South Bend Cubs	Chicago Cubs	South Bend, Indiana	Four Winds Field at Coveleski Stadium	10,500
West	Wisconsin Timber Rattlers	Milwaukee Brewers	Appleton, Wisconsin	Neuroscience Group Field at Fox Cities Stadium	5,900

East Division, West Division

== Teams since 1956 ==
- Beloit Sky Carp (2022–present)
  - Beloit Snappers (1995–2021)
  - Beloit Brewers (1982–1994)
- Bowling Green Hot Rods (2010–2020)
- Burlington Bees (1962–1981, 1993–2020)
  - Burlington Rangers (1982–1985)
  - Burlington Expos (1986–1987)
  - Burlington Braves (1988–1990)
  - Burlington Astros (1991–1992)
- Cedar Rapids Kernels (1993–present)
  - Cedar Rapids Red Raiders (1962–1964)
  - Cedar Rapids Cardinals (1965–1972)
  - Cedar Rapids Astros (1973–1974)
  - Cedar Rapids Giants (1975–1979)
  - Cedar Rapids Reds (1980–1992)
- Clinton LumberKings (1994–2020)
  - Clinton Pirates (1956–1959)
  - Clinton C-Sox (1960–1965)
  - Clinton Pilots (1966–1976)
  - Clinton Dodgers (1977–1979)
  - Clinton Giants (1980–1993)
- Danville Warriors (1970–1976)
- Dayton Dragons (2000–present)
  - Rockford Expos (1988–1992)
  - Rockford Royals (1993–1994)
  - Rockford Cubbies (1995–1998)
  - Rockford Reds (1999)
- Decatur Commodores (1956–1974)
- Dubuque Packers (1956–1967, 1974–1976; second franchise relocated from Quincy, Illinois)
  - Dubuque Royals (1968)
- Fort Wayne TinCaps (2009–present)
  - Mattoon Phillies (1956)
  - Mattoon Athletics (1957)
  - Keokuk Cardinals (1958–1961)
  - Keokuk Dodgers (April–August 1962)
  - Midwest Dodgers (August 1962), based in Dubuque, Iowa
  - Wisconsin Rapids Senators (1963)
  - Wisconsin Rapids Twins (1964–1983)
  - Kenosha Twins (1984–1992)
  - Fort Wayne Wizards (1993–2008)
- Great Lakes Loons (2007–present), based in Midland, Michigan
  - Springfield Cardinals (1982–1993), based in Springfield, Illinois
  - Madison Hatters (1994), based in Madison, Wisconsin
  - Michigan Battle Cats (1995–2002), based in Battle Creek, Michigan
  - Battle Creek Yankees (2003–2004), based in Battle Creek, Michigan
  - Southwest Michigan Devil Rays (2005–2006), based in Battle Creek, Michigan
- Kane County Cougars (1991–2020), based in Geneva, Illinois
  - Decatur Commodores (1956–1974)
  - Wausau Mets (1975–1978)
  - Wausau Timbers (1979–1990)
- Kokomo Dodgers (1956–1961)
- Lake County Captains (2010–present)
- Lansing Lugnuts (1996–present)
  - Lafayette Red Sox (1956–1957)
  - Waterloo Hawks (1958–1969)
  - Waterloo Royals (1970–1976)
  - Waterloo Indians (1977–1988)
  - Waterloo Diamonds (1989–1993)
  - Springfield Sultans (1994–1995)
- Michigan City White Caps (1956–1959)
- Paris Lakers (1956–1959)
- Peoria Chiefs (1984–present)
  - Danville Suns (1982)
  - Peoria Suns (1983)
- Quad Cities River Bandits (2008–present), based in Davenport, Iowa
  - Davenport Braves (1960)
  - Quad Cities Braves (1961)
  - Quad Cities Angels (1962–1976)
  - Quad City Angels (1976–1978, 1985–1991)
  - Quad City Cubs (1979–1984)
  - Quad City River Bandits (1992–2003)
  - Swing of the Quad Cities (2004–2007)
- Quincy Cubs (1965–1973); franchise moved to Dubuque, Iowa, after the 1973 season
  - Quincy Giants (1960–1961)
  - Quincy Jets (1962–1963)
  - Quincy Gems (1964)
- South Bend Cubs (2015–present)
  - South Bend White Sox (1988–1993)
  - South Bend Silver Hawks (1994–2014)
- West Michigan Whitecaps (1994–present)
  - Madison Muskies (1982–1993)
- Wisconsin Timber Rattlers (1995–present), based in Grand Chute, Wisconsin
  - Appleton Foxes (1962, 1967–1994)
  - Fox Cities Foxes (1963–1966)

== See also ==
- Baseball awards#U.S. minor leagues
