= Madison Muskies =

- 1982–1993; Madison, Wisconsin

Minor league affiliations
- Class: Class A (1982-1993)
- League: Midwest League (1982-1993)
- Division: North Division (1982-1993)

Major league affiliations
- Team: Oakland Athletics (1982-1993)

Minor league titles
- Division titles (3): 1982; 1986; 1991

Team data
- Name: Madison Muskies (1982-1993)
- Colors: Hunter green, gold, white, black (1990-1993); Kelly green, gold, white, black (1982-1989)
- Ballpark: Warner Park (1982-1993); Breese Stevens Field (1982)

The Madison Muskies were a Class A minor league baseball team that played in the Midwest League from 1982 to 1993 in Madison, Wisconsin. In 1993, the team relocated to Comstock Park, Michigan and became today's West Michigan Whitecaps. The Muskies were an affiliate of the Oakland Athletics. The team played at Breese Stevens Field and Warner Park and was founded by former Rochester Red Wings general manager Bob Drew.

== History ==
The Midwest League expanded in 1982, adding the Beloit Brewers, the Danville Suns, the Springfield Cardinals, and a team in Madison, Wisconsin. The name "Muskies" was chosen in a name-the-team contest and refers to the muskellunge, the state fish of Wisconsin. The debut Muskies team had a league-best 87–52 record, 6.5 games ahead of the Appleton Foxes in the North Division, however, they lost the Midwest League championship to the Foxes 2 games to 1. Tom Romano, a Muskies outfielder, was the Midwest League Most Valuable Player in 1982. In 1991, they made their second and last championship appearance, this time losing to the Clinton Giants 3 games to 0. That year, Muskies manager Gary Jones was awarded Midwest League Manager of the Year.

The Muskies played their last home game in Madison against the Foxes in 1993. In a driving rainstorm, with Appleton leading 5–3 in the bottom of the ninth inning, the Foxes' pitcher slipped on the mound and his manager requested that the game be called. After a second slip, the umpire called the game, ending the Muskies' Madison tenure in anticlimactic fashion: Madison's final home game ended with one out in the bottom of the ninth, with the potential tying run coming to bat.

They finished their 12-year run in Madison with an 860–786 record, .522 winning percentage, including three division titles and four second-place finishes.

== Notable Madison alumni ==
- Tim Belcher (1984)
- Scott Brosius (1988) MLB All-Star; 1998 World Series Most Valuable Player
- Jose Canseco (1983) 6 × MLB All-Star; 2 × MLB home run leader (1988, 1991); 1986 AL Rookie of the Year; 1988 AL Most Valuable Player
- Ron Coomer (1989) MLB All-Star
- Rick Honeycutt (1991) 2 x MLB All-Star; 1983 AL ERA Leader
- Tommy John (1985) 4 x MLB All-Star
- Luis Polonia (1984)
- Darren Lewis (1988)
- Terry Steinbach (1984) 3 x MLB All-Star
- Todd Van Poppel (1990) 1990 #1 Overall Draft Pick
- Walt Weiss (1986) MLB All-Star; 1988 AL Rookie of the Year
