= Mattoon Phillies =

- 1899–1957; (1899, 1906–1908, 1947–1957); Mattoon, Illinois

Minor league affiliations
- Class: Class E (1899); Class D (1906–1908, 1947–1957)
- League: Indiana–Illinois League (1899); Kentucky–Illinois–Tennessee League (1906); Eastern Illinois League (1907–1908); Illinois State League (1947–1948); Mississippi–Ohio Valley League (1949–1955); Midwest League (1956–1957)

Major league affiliations
- Team: Cleveland Indians (1948); Cincinnati Reds (1952); Philadelphia Phillies (1953–1956); Kansas City Athletics (1957)

Minor league titles
- League titles (1): 1907

Team data
- Name: Mattoon (1899); Mattoon Canaries (1906); Mattoon Giants (1907–1908); Mattoon Indians (1947–1952); Mattoon Phillies (1953–1956); Mattoon Athletics (1957)
- Ballpark: Mattoon Baseball Park (1947–1956)

The Mattoon Phillies was a primary nickname for the minor league baseball teams based in Mattoon, Illinois between 1899 and 1957. Mattoon teams played as members of the Indiana–Illinois League (1899), Kentucky–Illinois–Tennessee League (1906), Eastern Illinois League (1907–1908), Illinois State League (1947–1948), Mississippi–Ohio Valley League (1949–1955) and Midwest League (1956–1957).

Mattoon teams played as a minor league affiliate of the Chicago White Sox in 1947, Cleveland Indians in 1948, Cincinnati Reds in 1952, Philadelphia Phillies from 1953 to 1956 and Kansas City Athletics in 1957.

The franchise was the oldest in the Midwest League, evolving to become today's Fort Wayne TinCaps.

== History ==
The Mattoon Phillies were a charter member of the Midwest League in 1953. Additionally, Mattoon teams played in the two leagues directly preceding the Midwest League: the Mississippi–Ohio Valley League and the Illinois State League .

Earlier, Mattoon teams played in the Eastern Illinois League (1907–1908), Kentucky–Illinois–Tennessee League (1906) and Indiana–Illinois League (1899). Mattoon was an affiliate of the Chicago White Sox (1947), Cleveland Indians (1948), Cincinnati Reds (1952), Philadelphia Phillies (1953–1956) and Kansas City Athletics (1957).

The Mattoon Illinois State League franchise was the direct result of the efforts of the Mattoon Athletic Association, which was formed in 1947 by William Zurheider, Clyde Kirk and Charles Heath. The corporation issued 600 shares of stock at $250 and built a new ballpark. Charles Heath was also a founder of the ISL.

Mattoon had two no-hitters. On August 24, 1954, Tom Cronin defeated the Hannibal Cannibals 2–0 in a no-hitter. On July 16, 1956, Mike Wallace pitched a no-hitter against the Clinton Pirates, winning 6–0.

In 1958, the Mattoon franchise moved to Keokuk, Iowa and became the Keokuk Indians. The franchise is the oldest in the Midwest League, as it has evolved into today's Fort Wayne TinCaps.

== The ballpark ==
From 1947 to 1956 Mattoon teams were noted to have played minor league home games at the Mattoon Baseball Park. The ballpark hosted the 1948 Illinois State League All–Star Game and the 1950 Mississippi–Ohio Valley League All–Star Game. Baseball Hall of Fame member Earl Weaver played in the 1948 game. The ballpark had a capacity of 2,500 and was destroyed shortly after minor league team moved. The Mattoon Baseball Park was located at DeWitt Avenue & North Logan Street, Mattoon, Illinois.

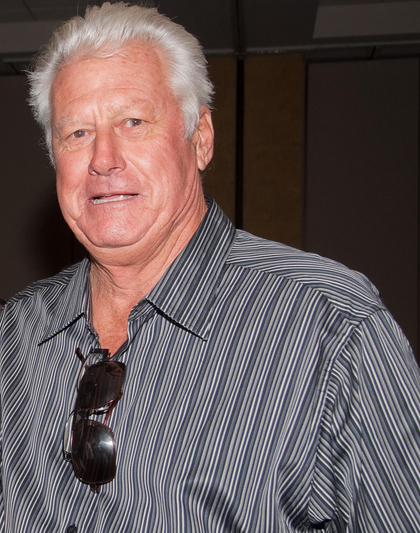
Dallas Green, 2009. Green managed the Philadelphia Phillies to the 1980 World Series Championship

== Timeline ==
Year(s)	# Yrs.	Team	Level	League	Affiliate
1899	1	Mattoon	Class E	Indiana–Illinois League	None
1906	1	Mattoon Canaries	Class D	Kentucky-Illinois-Tennessee League	None
1907–1908	1	Mattoon Giants	Class D	Eastern Illinois League	None
1947	1	Mattoon Indians	Class D	Illinois State League	None
1948	1	Mattoon Indians	Class D	Illinois State League	Cleveland Indians
1949–1951	3	Mattoon Indians	Class D	Mississippi–Ohio Valley League	None
1952	1	Mattoon Indians	Class D	Mississippi–Ohio Valley League	Cincinnati Reds
1953–1955	2	Mattoon Phillies	Class D	Mississippi–Ohio Valley League	Philadelphia Phillies
1956	1	Mattoon Phillies	Class D	Midwest League	Philadelphia Phillies
1957	1	Mattoon Athletics	Class D	Midwest League	Kansas City Athletics

== Notable alumni ==
- Lew Krausse, Sr. (1957, MGR)
- Art Mahaffey (1956) 3x MLB All-Star
- Jimmie Coker (1955)
- Jim Golden (1954–1955)
- Dallas Green (1955) Manager: 1980 World Series Champion – Philadelphia Phillies; Philadelphia Phillies Wall of Fame
- Don Landrum (1954)
- Grover Lowdermilk (1908)
- Larry Doyle (1906) 1915 NL Batting Champion; 1912 NL Most Valuable Player
- Pug Bennett (1899)
- Roy Brashear (1899)
- Dummy Taylor (1899)
- Bob Wicker (1899)

== See also ==
- Mattoon Giants players
- Mattoon Indians players
- Mattoon Phillies players
- Mattoon-Charleston Canaries players
