= Illinois State League =

- Most recent season or competition: 1948 Illinois State League season
- Classification: Class D (1947–1948)
- Sport: Minor League Baseball
- First season: 1947
- Folded: 1948
- Replaced by: Mississippi-Ohio Valley League
- President: Howard V. Millard (1947–1948)
- No. of teams: 6
- Country: United States of America
- Most titles: 1 Belleville Stags (1947); West Frankfort Cardinals (1948)
- Related competitions: Illinois-Indiana-Iowa League
- Website: Midwest League Official Website

The Illinois State League (ISL) was a baseball minor league formed in 1947. The Illinois State League operated in 1947–1948 and evolved to become today's Midwest League. The Class D league was composed entirely of new franchises, each located in Southern Illinois. The charter franchises were in the Illinois cities of Belleville, Centralia, Marion, Mattoon, Mount Vernon and West Frankfort.

== History ==
The Illinois State League formed in 1947. The first league president was Howard V. Millard. The Illinois State League had the same six franchises in both of its seasons: the Belleville Stags, Centralia Cubs, Marion Indians, Mattoon Indians, Mount Vernon Braves, and West Frankfort Cardinals.

In 1947, the league began play, with a 120–game season played in two halves. There was no championship series in 1947 as the Belleville Stags won both halves and were declared as the champion.

In 1948, the West Frankfort Cardinals finished 85–35 in the regular season, for the best record overall. In the playoffs, West Frankfort swept the Mattoon Indians in three games in the Championship Series to capture the 1948 championship.

The Illinois State League was renamed the Mississippi–Ohio Valley League after the 1948 season. The name change occurred as the Marion Indians moved to the state of Kentucky to become the Paducah Chiefs. Subsequently, the Mississippi–Ohio Valley League operated through 1955. In 1956, the league changed names again to become the Midwest League. The Midwest League has remained in operation since 1956.

== All–Star games ==
The Illinois State League held an annual All–Star Game, which featured an all–star team versus the team with the best record in the standings. The first All–Star Game was held on August 12, 1947 at Memorial Stadium in West Frankfort. The Illinois State League All–Stars defeated Belleville 5–1.

The 1948 Illinois State League All–Star Game was July 12, 1948 at Mattoon Baseball Park. The 1948 All–Stars defeated the Mattoon Indians 1–0.

== Illinois State League teams: 1947–1948 ==
| Team name | City represented | Ballpark | Year(s) active |
|---|---|---|---|
| Belleville Stags | Belleville, Illinois | Belleville Athletic Field | 1947 to 1948 |
| Centralia Cubs | Centralia, Illinois | Fan's Field | 1947 to 1948 |
| Marion Indians | Marion, Illinois | Marion City Park | 1947 to 1948 |
| Mattoon Indians | Mattoon, Illinois | Mattoon Baseball Park | 1947 to 1948 |
| Mount Vernon Braves | Mount Vernon, Illinois | Veterans Park | 1947 to 1948 |
| West Frankfort Cardinals | West Frankfort, Illinois | Memorial Stadium | 1947 to 1948 |

== Standings & statistics ==
=== 1947 season ===
| Team name | W | L | PCT | GB | Attend | Managers |
|---|---|---|---|---|---|---|
| Belleville Stags | 75 | 37 | .670 | - | 18,539 | Walter DeFreitas |
| Centralia Cubs | 60 | 52 | .536 | 15½ | 35,000 | Chuck Hawley |
| Marion Indians | 55 | 56 | .495 | 19½ | 36,705 | Melvin Ivy |
| West Frankfort Cardinals | 52 | 60 | .464 | 23 | 43,004 | Everett Johnston |
| Mt. Vernon Braves | 49 | 63 | .438 | 26 | 38,330 | Otto Huber |
| Mattoon Indians | 41 | 64 | .390 | 30½ | 25,671 | Frank Parenti |

No playoffs were played as Belleville won both halves

Player statistics
| Player | Team | Stat | Tot | Player | Team | Stat | Tot |
|---|---|---|---|---|---|---|---|
| Billy Klaus | Centralia | BA | .341 | Robert Freels | Belleville | W | 19 |
| Billy Klaus | Centralia | Hits | 147 | Don Liddle | Mt. Vernon | SO | 190 |
| Billy Klaus | Centralia | RBI | 84 | Ken Wild | West Frankfort | ERA | 1.73 |
| Rip Repulski | West Frankfort | HR | 10 | Bob Cherek | Belleville | Runs | 90 |

=== 1948 season ===
| Team name | W | L | PCT | GB | Attend | Managers |
|---|---|---|---|---|---|---|
| West Frankfort Cardinals | 85 | 35 | .708 | - | 36,656 | Harold Contini |
| Mattoon Indians | 75 | 44 | .630 | 9½ | 34,754 | Chuck Hawley |
| Marion Indians | 53 | 66 | .445 | 31½ | 13,697 | Melvin Ivy |
| Mt. Vernon Braves | 52 | 66 | .441 | 32 | 11.364 | Creepy Crespi |
| Belleville Stags | 51 | 67 | .432 | 33 | 6,085 | Gerald Nemitz / Shan Deniston |
| Centralia Cubs | 41 | 79 | .342 | 44 | 18,211 | Willard Sellergren / Claude Passeau |

Playoffs: West Frankfort defeated Marion 3 games to 1; Mattoon defeated Mt. Vernon 3 games to 2; Finals: West Frankfort 3 games, Mattoon 0.

Player statistics
| Player | Team | Stat | Tot | Player | Team | Stat | Tot |
|---|---|---|---|---|---|---|---|
| Richard Martz | Marion | BA | .361 | Floyd Melliere | West Frankfort | W | 21 |
| Don Hazelton | Mt. Vernon | Hits | 150 | Mike Blyzka | Belleville | SO | 192 |
| Frank Porreca | West Frankfort | RBI | 94 | Floyd Melliere | West Frankfort | ERA | 1.77 |
| Paul Deters | Marion | HR | 8 | William Broukal | Mattoon | Runs | 103 |
