= Sports in New England =

Overview of sports activities in New England

Three popular American sports were invented in New England. Basketball was invented by James Naismith, a Canadian, in Springfield, Massachusetts, in 1891. Volleyball was invented by William G. Morgan in Holyoke, Massachusetts, in 1895. Paintball was invented in 1981 in Henniker, New Hampshire.

It is also widely believed the first organized ice hockey game in the United States was played in Concord, New Hampshire, in 1883.

The region is famous for its passion for baseball and the Boston Red Sox, as well as for the intense rivalry between the Red Sox and the New York Yankees. The Red Sox were founded in 1901, and won the first-ever World Series in 1903. After five championships in the early 1900s, the team became infamous for the Curse of the Bambino, a period between 1918 and 2004 during which the Red Sox did not win any titles. After breaking the streak, the Red Sox won three more titles in the early 2000s, and currently have nine MLB titles.

On November 1, 1924, the Boston Bruins of the National Hockey League became the first NHL franchise to be based in the United States. They are now the second-oldest surviving major professional sports team in Boston, after the Red Sox. The Bruins' historic rivalry with the Montreal Canadiens, a fellow Original Six team, has, at times, reached the level of intensity of the Yankees – Red Sox rivalry in professional baseball in the region.

The Boston Celtics were founded on June 6, 1946, as one of the National Basketball Association's original teams, and are one of two to have remained in the city where they were founded. The team has won 18 NBA Finals, more than any other team, and the team's eight consecutive titles between 1959 and 1966 stand as a record amongst all four major American sports leagues. The Celtics' rivalry with the Los Angeles Lakers is generally considered the greatest in professional basketball, and has, at times, reached the level of intensity of the Yankees – Red Sox rivalry.

The New England Patriots football team is based in Foxborough, Massachusetts, halfway between Boston and Providence. In 1999, the Patriots flirted with the idea of moving to Hartford, in what three National Football League (NFL) franchise owners called "the greatest financial deal any NFL owner has ever received". The deal, however, fell through, and the team remained in Foxborough. The team has won six Super Bowls, tied for the most among all NFL teams.

The oldest Major League Baseball (MLB) professional baseball park still in use, Fenway Park, dating from April 1912, is within the Boston city limits. Matthews Arena, in use from 1910 to 2026, was on the property of Northeastern University, also within Boston city limits. At the time of its closure, it was the oldest indoor ice hockey rink still in use worldwide.

== Famous athletes playing for New England teams ==
  - Boston Red Sox: Bobby Doerr, Joe Cronin, Johnny Pesky, Carl Yastrzemski, Ted Williams, Jim Rice, Wade Boggs, Carlton Fisk, David Ortiz, Pedro Martinez, Cy Young, Tris Speaker, Harry Hooper, Jimmie Foxx, Lefty Grove, Dom DiMaggio, Rico Petrocelli, Luis Tiant, Fred Lynn, Dwight Evans, Roger Clemens, Mo Vaughn, Nomar Garciaparra, Tim Wakefield, Jason Varitek, Manny Ramirez, Kevin Youkilis, Mike Lowell, Dustin Pedroia, Jon Lester, Xander Bogaerts, Mookie Betts, Jackie Bradley Jr.
  - Boston Bruins: Eddie Shore, Lionel Hitchman, Bobby Orr, Aubrey "Dit" Clapper, Phil Esposito, Cam Neely, Johnny Bucyk, Milt Schmidt, Rick Middleton, Terry O'Reilly, Ray Bourque, Patrice Bergeron, Wayne Cashman, David Krejci, Bill Cowley, Zdeno Chara, Tiny Thompson, Frank Brimsek, Eddie Johnston, Gerry Cheevers, Tuukka Rask, David Pastrnak
  - Boston Celtics: Robert Parish, Dennis Johnson, Kevin Garnett, Bill Russell, Jo Jo White, Bob Cousy, Tom Heinsohn, Satch Sanders, John Havlicek, Dave Cowens, Jim Loscutoff, Don Nelson, Bill Sharman, Ed Macauley, Frank Ramsey, Sam Jones, K.C. Jones, Cedric Maxwell, Kevin McHale, Larry Bird, Paul Pierce, Reggie Lewis, Danny Ainge, Antoine Walker, Ray Allen, Rajon Rondo, Isaiah Thomas, Marcus Smart, Al Horford, Jayson Tatum, Jaylen Brown, Derrick White, Jrue Holiday, Kristaps Porzingis
  - New England Patriots: Gino Cappelletti, Mike Haynes, Steve Nelson, John Hannah, Bruce Armstrong, Jim Lee Hunt, Bob Dee, Tom Brady, Rob Gronkowski, Nick Buoniconti, Steve Grogan, Andre Tippett, Stanley Morgan, Ben Coates, Jim Nance, Sam Cunningham, Drew Bledsoe, Jon Morris, Troy Brown, Adam Vinatieri, Tedy Bruschi, Ty Law, Willie McGinest, Houston Antwine, Kevin Faulk, Raymond Clayborn, Matt Light, Rodney Harrison, Stephen Gostkowski, Julian Edelman, Danny Amendola, Dont'a Hightower, Matthew Slater, Devin McCourty, Randy Moss, Drake Maye
  - New England Revolution: Taylor Twellman, Shalrie Joseph, Steve Ralston, Clint Dempsey, Matt Reis, Jay Heaps, Lee Nguyen, Michael Parkhurst, Matthew Turner, Diego Fagúndez, Carles Gil, Joe-Max Moore, Teal Bunbury, Walter Zenga, Gustavo Bou, Andrew Farrell, Tajon Buchanan, Chris Tierney, Brandon Bye, Alexi Lalas, Scott Caldwell, DeJuan Jones, Bobby Wood, Esmir Bajraktarevic, Giacomo Vrioni, Tomás Chancalay, Noel Buck, Đorđe Petrović
  - Boston Braves: Hugh Duffy, Hank Gowdy, Rabbit Maranville, Tommy McCarthy, Johnny Sain, Kid Nichols, Warren Spahn, Al Spalding, Charles Radbourn
  - Hartford Whalers: Rick Ley, Gordie Howe, John McKenzie, Ron Francis, Kevin Dineen, Mike Rogers, Tom Webster, Pat Verbeek
  - Connecticut Sun: Katie Douglas, Nykesha Sales, Taj McWilliams-Franklin, Asjha Jones, Lindsay Whalen, Tina Charles, Jonquel Jones, Brionna Jones, DeWanna Bonner, DiJonai Carrington

== List of professional and semi-professional sports teams in New England ==
=== Baseball ===
- Professional
  - Major League Baseball
    - Boston Red Sox (Boston, Massachusetts)
  - International League (AAA)
    - Worcester Red Sox (Worcester, Massachusetts)
  - Eastern League (AA)
    - Hartford Yard Goats (Hartford, Connecticut)
    - New Hampshire Fisher Cats (Manchester, New Hampshire)
    - Portland Sea Dogs (Portland, Maine)
  - National Association of Professional Baseball (Independent)
    - Brockton Rox (Brockton, Massachusetts)
- Semi-Pro/Amateur
  - Futures Collegiate Baseball League (Collegiate Summer)
    - Lowell Spinners (Lowell, Massachusetts)
    - Nashua Silver Knights (Nashua, New Hampshire)
    - New Britain Bees (New Britain, Connecticut)
    - Norwich Sea Unicorns (Norwich, Connecticut)
    - Vermont Lake Monsters (Burlington, Vermont)
    - Westfield Starfires (Westfield, Massachusetts)
    - Worcester Bravehearts (Worcester, Massachusetts)
  - Cape Cod Baseball League (Collegiate Summer)
    - Bourne Braves (Bourne, Massachusetts)
    - Brewster Whitecaps (Brewster, Massachusetts)
    - Chatham Anglers (Chatham, Massachusetts)
    - Cotuit Kettleers (Cotuit, Massachusetts)
    - Falmouth Commodores (Falmouth, Massachusetts)
    - Harwich Mariners (Harwich, Massachusetts)
    - Hyannis Harbor Hawks (Hyannis, Massachusetts)
    - Orleans Firebirds (Orleans, Massachusetts)
    - Wareham Gatemen (Wareham, Massachusetts)
    - Yarmouth-Dennis Red Sox (South Yarmouth, Massachusetts)
  - New England Collegiate Baseball League (Collegiate Summer)
    - Bristol Blues (Bristol, Connecticut)
    - Danbury Westerners (Danbury, Connecticut)
    - Keene Swamp Bats (Keene, New Hampshire)
    - Martha's Vineyard Sharks (Oak Bluffs, Massachusetts)
    - Mystic Schooners (Groton, Connecticut)
    - Newport Gulls (Newport, Rhode Island)
    - North Adams SteepleCats (North Adams, Massachusetts)
    - North Shore Navigators (Lynn, Massachusetts)
    - Ocean State Waves (North Kingstown, Rhode Island)
    - Sanford Mainers (Sanford, Maine)
    - Upper Valley Nighthawks (Hartford, Vermont)
    - Valley Blue Sox (Holyoke, Massachusetts)
    - Vermont Mountaineers (Montpelier, Vermont)

=== Football ===
- Professional
  - National Football League
    - New England Patriots (Foxborough, Massachusetts)
  - United Football League
    - Rhode Island Breakers (Pawtucket, Rhode Island)
- Semi-Pro/Amateur
  - East Coast Football League – (AAA)
    - Boston Bandits (Boston, Massachusetts)
    - Connecticut Mustangs (Meriden, Connecticut)
    - Connecticut Bulls (Bristol, Connecticut)
    - Marlboro Shamrocks (Marlborough, Massachusetts)
    - Southern New England Admirals (North Smithfield, Rhode Island)
    - Western Mass Raiders (Springfield, Massachusetts)
  - East Coast Football League – (AA)
    - Granite State Destroyers (Manchester, New Hampshire)
    - Haverhill Hitmen (Haverhill, Massachusetts)
    - Mill City Eagles (Chelmsford, Massachusetts)
    - Randolph Oilers (Randolph, Massachusetts)
    - Troy City Titans (Fall River, Massachusetts)
    - Valley Generals (Derby, Connecticut)
  - New England Football League - (AA)
    - Glens Falls Greenjackets (Glens Falls, NY)
    - Middleboro Cobras (Middleboro, Massachusetts)
    - New England Bombers (Braintree, Massachusetts)
    - Rhode Island Riptide (Cranston, Rhode Island)
    - Southern Vermont Storm (Bennington, Vermont)
    - Vermont Ravens (Burlington, Vermont)

=== Basketball ===
- Professional
  - National Basketball Association
    - Boston Celtics (Boston, Massachusetts)
  - NBA G League
    - Maine Celtics (Portland, Maine)
  - Big3
    - Boston Ball Hogs (Boston, Massachusetts)
  - The Basketball League
    - New England Kraken (Boston, Massachusetts)
  - UpShot League
    - UpShot Providence (Providence, Rhode Island)

=== Ice Hockey ===
- Professional
  - National Hockey League
    - Boston Bruins (Boston, Massachusetts)
  - Professional Woman's Hockey League
    - Boston Fleet (Boston, Massachusetts)
  - American Hockey League
    - Hartford Wolf Pack (Hartford, Connecticut)
    - Providence Bruins (Providence, Rhode Island)
    - Springfield Thunderbirds (Springfield, Massachusetts)
  - ECHL
    - Maine Mariners (Portland, Maine)
    - Worcester Railers (Worcester, Massachusetts)
  - Federal Prospects Hockey League
    - Danbury Hat Tricks (Danbury, Connecticut)

=== Soccer ===
- Professional
  - Major League Soccer
    - New England Revolution (Foxborough, Massachusetts)
  - National Women's Soccer League
    - Boston Legacy FC (Boston, Massachusetts)
  - USL Championship
    - Hartford Athletic (Hartford, Connecticut)
    - Rhode Island FC (Pawtucket, Rhode Island)
  - MLS Next Pro
    - New England Revolution II (Foxborough, Massachusetts)
    - CT United FC (Norwich, Connecticut)
  - USL League One
    - Portland Hearts of Pine (Portland, Maine)
  - Major Arena Soccer League 2
    - Spice City FC (Danbury, Connecticut)
- Semi-Pro/Amateur
  - USL League Two
    - AC Connecticut (Danbury, Connecticut)
    - Black Rock FC (Manchester Center, Vermont)
    - Boston Bolts (Waban, Massachusetts)
    - GPS Portland Phoenix (Portland, Maine)
    - Seacoast United Phantoms (Amesbury, Massachusetts)
    - Western Mass Pioneers (Ludlow, Massachusetts)
    - Vermont Green FC (Burlington, Vermont)
    - Boston City FC (Revere, Massachusetts)
  - National Premier Soccer League
    - Greater Lowell Rough Diamonds (Tyngsborough, Massachusetts)
    - Hartford City FC (Hartford, Connecticut)
    - Rhode Island Reds FC (Providence, Rhode Island)

=== Lacrosse ===
- Professional
  - Premier Lacrosse League
    - Boston Cannons (Boston, Massachusetts)
  - Women's Lacrosse League
    - Boston Guard (Boston, Massachusetts)

=== Motorsports facilities in New England ===
- NASCAR
  - New Hampshire Motor Speedway (Loudon, New Hampshire)
- NHRA
  - New England Dragway (Epping, New Hampshire)
- SCCA
  - Lime Rock Park (Lime Rock, Connecticut)

=== Gaelic football ===
- Boston GAA

=== Rugby union ===
- Professional
  - Major League Rugby
    - New England Free Jacks (Weymouth, Massachusetts)
- Semi-Pro/Amateur
  - USA Rugby Elite Cup
    - Boston RFC (Boston, Massachusetts)
  - New England Rugby Football Union

=== Rugby league ===
- Semi-Pro/Amateur
  - USA Rugby League
    - Boston Bears (Boston, Massachusetts)

=== Cricket ===
- Semi-Pro/Amateur
  - Minor League Cricket
    - New England Eagles (Hartford, Connecticut)

=== Ultimate Frisbee ===
- Professional
  - Ultimate Frisbee Association
    - Boston Glory (Medford, Massachusetts)

== NCAA Division I schools in New England ==
Football Bowl Subdivision

- Boston College (ACC / Hockey East)
- University of Connecticut (FBS Independent / Big East Conference / Hockey East)
- University of Massachusetts Amherst (Atlantic 10 / Hockey East / Independents)

Football Championship Subdivision

- Boston University (Patriot League / Hockey East)
- Brown University (Ivy League / ECAC Hockey)
- Bryant University (America East)
- Central Connecticut State University (Northeast)
- Dartmouth College (Ivy League / ECAC Hockey)
- Harvard University (Ivy League / ECAC Hockey)
- College of the Holy Cross (Patriot League / Atlantic Hockey)
- University of Maine (America East / Hockey East / Colonial)
- Merrimack College (Northeast / Hockey East)
- University of New Hampshire (America East / Hockey East / Colonial)
- University of Rhode Island (Atlantic 10 / Colonial)
- Sacred Heart University (Northeast / Atlantic Hockey)
- Stonehill College (Northeast)
- Yale University (Ivy League / ECAC Hockey)

Non-football

- Fairfield University (Metro Atlantic)
- University of Hartford (America East)
- University of Massachusetts Lowell (America East / Hockey East)
- Northeastern University (Colonial / Hockey East)
- Providence College (Big East / Hockey East)
- Quinnipiac University (Metro Atlantic / ECAC Hockey)
- University of Vermont (America East / Hockey East)

Additionally, two colleges compete at the Division I level in ice hockey only: American International and Bentley College compete in the Atlantic Hockey Association.

== Former Professional Teams ==
=== Major Leagues ===
Team Name	Sport	League	Years in New England	Location	Fate
Boston Braves	Baseball	National Association (1871-1876) National League (1876-1952)	1871-1952	Boston, MA	Relocated Now Atlanta Braves
Providence Grays	Baseball	National League	1878-1885	Providence, RI	Folded
Worcester Worcesters	Baseball	National League	1879-1882	Worcester, MA	Folded
Providence Steamrollers	Basketball	Basketball Association of America	1946-1949	Providence, RI	Folded
Connecticut Sun	Basketball	Women's National Basketball Association	2003-2026	Uncasville, CT	Relocated Now Houston Comets
Providence Steam Roller	Football	Independent (1916-1924) National Football League (1925-1931)	1916-1931	Providence, RI	Folded
Waterbury/Hartford Blues	Football	Independent (1924-1925, 1927) National Football League (1926)	1924-1927	Waterbury, CT (1924-1925) Hartford, CT (1926-1927)	Folded
Boston Bulldogs	Football	National Football League	1929	Boston, MA	Folded
Boston Redskins	Football	National Football League	1932-1936	Boston, MA	Relocated Now Washington Commanders
Boston Yanks	Football	National Football League	1944-1948	Boston, MA	Folded
New England/Hartford Whalers	Hockey	World Hockey Association (1972-1979) National Hockey League (1979-1997)	1972-1997	Boston, MA (1972-1974) West Springfield, MA (1974-1975) Hartford, CT (1975-1978, 1980-1997) Springfield, MA (1978-1980)	Relocated Now Carolina Hurricanes

=== Minor Leagues (since 1950) ===
Team Name	Sport	League	Years	Location	Fate
Springfield Cubs	Baseball	International League	1950-1953	Springfield, MA	Relocated to Havana, Cuba as the Havana Sugar Kings Now Norfolk Tides
Maine Guides	Baseball	International League	1984-1988	Old Orchard Beach, ME	Relocated to Moosic, PA Now Scranton/Wilkes-Barre Highlanders
Pawtucket Red Sox	Baseball	International League	1973-2020	Pawtucket, RI	Relocated to Worcester, MA Now Worcester Red Sox
Hartford Chiefs	Baseball	Eastern League	1938-1952	Hartford, CT	Folded
Springfield Giants	Baseball	Eastern League	1957-1965	Springfield, MA	Folded
Pawtucket Indians	Baseball	Eastern League	1966-1967	Pawtucket, RI	Folded
Manchester Yankees	Baseball	Eastern Leage	1969-1971	Manchester, NH	Relocated to West Haven, CT as the West Haven Yankees Now Richmond Flying Squirrels
Waterbury Pirates	Baseball	Eastern League	1966-1971	Waterbury, CT	Folded
Pawtucket Red Sox	Baseball	Eastern League	1970-1972	Pawtucket, RI	Relocated to Bristol, CT as the Bristol Red Sox Now Hartford Yard Goats
Pittsfield Senators	Baseball	Eastern League	1970-1976	Pittsfield, MA	Folded
Bristol Red Sox	Baseball	Eastern League	1973-1982	Bristol, CT	Relocated to New Britain, CT as the New Britain Red Sox Now Hartford Yard Goats
Holyoke Millers	Baseball	Eastern League	1977-1982	Holyoke, MA	Relocated to Nashua, NH as the Nashua Angels Now Harrisburg Senators
West Haven A's	Baseball	Eastern League	1972-1982	West Haven, CT	Relocated to Albany, NY as the Albany A's Now Richmond Flying Squirrels
Lynn Sailors	Baseball	Eastern League	1980-1983	Lynn, MA	Relocated to Burlington, VT as the Vermont Reds Now Akron RubberDucks
Nashua Pirates	Baseball	Eastern League	1983-1986	Nashua, NH	Relocated to Harrisburg, PA Now Harrisburg Senators
Waterbury Indians	Baseball	Eastern League	1973-1986	Waterbury, CT	Folded
Pittsfield Cubs	Baseball	Eastern League	1985-1988	Pittsfield, MA	Relocated to Williamsport, PA as the Williamsport Bills Now Binghamton Rumble Ponies
Vermont Mariners	Baseball	Eastern League	1984-1988	Burlington, VT	Relocated to Canton, OH as the Canton-Akron Indians Now Akron RubberDucks
New Haven Ravens	Baseball	Eastern League	1994-2003	New Haven, CT	Relocated to Manchester, NH Now New Hampshire Fisher Cats
Connecticut Defenders	Baseball	Eastern League	1995-2009	Norwich, CT	Relocated to Richmond, VA Now Richmond Flying Squirrels
New Britain Rock Cats	Baseball	Eastern League	1983-2015	New Britain, CT	Relocated to Hartford, CT Now Hartford Yard Goats
Pittsfield Mets	Baseball	New York–Penn League	1989-2001	Pittsfield, MA	Relocated to Troy, NY Now Tri-City ValleyCats
Springfield Armor	Basketball	NBA G League	2009-2014	Springfield, MA	Relocated to Grand Rapids, MI Now Grand Rapids Gold
Massachusetts Pirates	Indoor Football	National Arena League (2018-2020) Indoor Football League (2021-2025)	2018-2025	Worcester, MA (2018-2023) Lowell, MA (2024-2025)	Relocated to Orlando, FL Now Orlando Pirates
Boston Renegades	Football	Women's Football Alliance	2015-2024	Revere, MA	Folded
New Haven Eagles	Ice Hockey	American Hockey League	1926-1951	New Haven, CT	Folded
Providence Reds	Ice Hockey	American Hockey League	1926-1977	Providence, RI	Relocated to Binghamton, NY as the Binghamton Dusters Now Hartford Wolf Pack
Springfield Indians	Ice Hockey	American Hockey League	1954-1994	Springfield, MA	Relocated to Worcester, MA as the Worcester IceCats Now Abbotsford Canucks
Boston Braves	Ice Hockey	American Hockey League	1971-1974	Boston, MA	Inactive until 1990; re-established in Troy, NY as the Capital District Islanders Now Charlotte Checkers
New Haven Nighthawks	Ice Hockey	American Hockey League	1972-1993	New Haven, CT	Relocated to Charlottetown, PEI as the Prince Edward Island Senators Now Belleville Senators
Maine Mariners	Ice Hockey	American Hockey League	1977-1987	Portland, ME	Relocated to Utica, NY as the Utica Devils Now Calgary Wranglers
Maine Mariners	Ice Hockey	American Hockey League	1987-1992	Portland, ME	Relocated to Providence, RI Now Providence Bruins
Portland Pirates	Ice Hockey	American Hockey League	1993-2016	Portland, ME	Relocated to Springfield, MA Now Springfield Thunderbirds
Worcester IceCats	Ice Hockey	American Hockey League	1994-2005	Worcester, MA	Relocated to Peoria, IL as the Peoria Rivermen Now Abbotsford Canucks
Springfield Falcons	Ice Hockey	American Hockey League	1994-2016	Springfield, MA	Relocated to Tucson, AZ Now Tucson Roadrunners
Beast of New Haven	Ice Hockey	American Hockey League	1997-1999	New Haven, CT	Folded
Lowell Devils	Ice Hockey	American Hockey League	1998-2010	Lowell, MA	Relocated to Albany, NY as the Albany Devils Now Utica Comets
Manchester Monarchs	Ice Hockey	American Hockey League	2001-2015	Manchester, NH	Relocated to Ontario, CA Now Ontario Reign
Bridgeport Islanders	Ice Hockey	American Hockey League	2001-2026	Bridgeport, CT	Relocated to Hamilton, ON Now Hamilton Hammers
Worcester Sharks	Ice Hockey	American Hockey League	2006-2015	Worcester, MA	Relocated to San Jose, CA Now San Jose Barracuda
Manchester Monarchs	Ice Hockey	ECHL	2015-2019	Manchester, NH	Folded

== Fan base ==
In the parts of southwestern Connecticut that are close to New York City, most people tend to be fans of New York sports teams, and are often self-identified as suburban New Yorkers. Additionally, until the team relocated to Washington, D.C., for the start of the 2005 season, the Montreal Expos received some fan support in northern New England. The Montreal Canadiens are the NHL's closest team to Northern New England.

For the Mets, when they were in the World Series in their championship season of 1986, split allegiances among fans of both the Mets and opposing Boston Red Sox led to an article in The Boston Globe to coin the phrase "Red Sox Nation".

Since the mid-1990s, the University of Connecticut men's and women's basketball programs (winning 5 men's and 11 women's NCAA national titles since 1995) has drawn a large regional following especially in their home state of Connecticut.

The Boston College Eagles hockey team has also attracted a large following, winning four national championships in 2001, 2008, 2010, and 2012. Their football team also garnered support while current Atlanta Falcons quarterback Matt Ryan played for the Eagles. The Boston University Terriers hockey team has likewise received large support over the years, winning the national championship in 2009, and has been a staple of Boston collegiate hockey over the past century. The Green Line Rivalry between Boston University and Boston College has been said to be one of the greatest rivalries in all of sports; the two teams compete against each other as well as the hockey teams from fellow Boston universities Harvard University Crimson and Northeastern University Huskies.

New England is home to an NFL Football team, the New England Patriots. The Patriots, based in Foxborough, Massachusetts, are the most popular NFL team in Massachusetts. However, other teams have small followings in the region, including the Pittsburgh Steelers and the New York Giants.

New Hampshire Motor Speedway is an oval racetrack which has hosted several NASCAR and American Championship Car Racing races, whereas Lime Rock Park is a traditional road racing venue home of sports car races. Both NASCAR Cup races at New Hampshire Motor Speedway draw over 100,000 fans, thus making NHMS the largest capacity sports venue in New England. New Hampshire also possesses the New England Dragway facility in Epping, New Hampshire, as one of the very few remaining dragstrips in the New England region.

== See also ==
- New England Auto Racers Hall of Fame
- NBC Sports Boston
- New England Sports Network
- Sports in Connecticut
- Sports in Maine
- Sports in Massachusetts
- Sports in New Hampshire
- Sports in Rhode Island
- Sports in Vermont
