= Old Orchard Beach Raging Tide =

Maine collegiate summer baseball team

Logo
Cap insignia

Information
- League: FCBL (East Division)
- Location: Old Orchard Beach, ME (2011-2014); Lowell, MA (2000-2010)
- Ballpark: The Ball Park (2011-2014)
- Founded: 2000
- League championships: 0
- Former name: Lowell All-Americans (2007-2010); Mill City All-Americans (2000-2006)
- Former leagues: NECBL (2000-2011); East Division (2009-2011); Northern Division (2002, 2004-2008); National Division (2001)
- Former ballpark: Stoklosa Alumni Field (2000-2010)
- Colors: Navy, Teal
- Mascot: Dune Doggy
- Ownership: John and Pam Gallo (OOB Collegiate Baseball Club LLC.)
- Management: Taylor Fisher (GM)
- Manager: Chris Torres
- Website: oobragingtide.com

The Old Orchard Beach Raging Tide was a collegiate summer baseball team based in Old Orchard Beach, Maine. It was a member of the Futures Collegiate Baseball League (FCBL), a wood-bat league with a 56-game regular season comprising 10 teams from New Hampshire to western Connecticut. The team played its home games at The Ball Park.

Until 2012, the team was in the New England Collegiate Baseball League. For the first ten years of the team's existence, its home was in Lowell, Massachusetts and it was known as the All-Americans.

The 2014 season was the final year in Old Orchard Beach. Owners John & Pam Gallo sold the Raging Tide franchise, which became the Bristol Blues.

== History ==
=== All-Americans ===
Mill City All-Americans logo (2000-06)

Lowell All-Americans logo (2007-10)

In the 2000 season, the NECBL expanded by adding two teams: the Manchester Silkworms and the Mill City All-Americans. The name "All-Americans" came from the fact that Lowell was named an All-American City in 1999 and was named a finalist in 1997 and 1998. From 2000 to 2006, the team was known as the Mill City All-Americans because Lowell's nickname is "The Mill City." However, many NECBL teams are located in the "mill cities" of New England; and beginning with the 2007 season, the team changed its name to the Lowell All-Americans for clarity.

The All-Americans reached the playoffs in the team's inaugural season but fell 2 games to 1 to the then-Rhode Island Gulls. The team only reached the playoffs 2 more times: in 2002 and 2007.

=== Move to Old Orchard Beach ===
During the 2010 NECBL regular season, the All-Americans played two home games in Nashua, New Hampshire and one at The Ball Park in Old Orchard Beach. Newspapers in both places interpreted the decision as a search for a new home. The Ball Park, which once played host to the Triple-A Maine Guides and Maine Phillies, had fallen into disrepair but had been rehabilitated by local volunteers. The visitors for this contest, on July 2, were the Mainers of nearby Sanford, Maine.

On Sept. 22, 2010, the Old Orchard Beach Town Council accepted a letter of intent from the All-Americans to place a franchise at The Ball Park, a move that the NECBL had approved. The Town Council signed a final agreement on October 5. On November 8, the team announced that its name would be the Raging Tide.

The 2011 regular season featured six games against Sanford, three in each venue. The Raging Tide finished the inaugural season at The Ball Park with a record of 9-33, last in the Eastern Division.

=== Switch to FCBL ===
In 2012, the team jumped from the NECBL to the Futures Collegiate Baseball League, joined by fellow NECBL team, the North Shore Navigators, in a round of expansion that more than doubled the size of the FCBL.

== Postseason appearances ==
=== NECBL ===
Year	Division Semi-Finals*		Division Finals*		NECBL Championship Series
Mill City All-Americans
2000			Rhode Island Gulls	L (1-2)	
2002	Concord Quarry Dogs	W (2-1)	Keene Swamp Bats	L (1-2)	
Lowell All-Americans
2007	Holyoke Giants	L (1-2)			
Old Orchard Beach Raging Tide

  - The NECBL did not separate into divisions until 2001.

=== FCBL ===
Year	Play-In Round**		Semi-Final Round*		FCBL Championship
2013	Pittsfield Suns	W (1-0)	Martha's Vineyard Sharks	L (0-2)	

  - The FCBL changed its postseason to a two-round format starting in the 2012 season
    - A one-game Play-In round was added in the 2013 season
