= Montpelier Recreation Field =

Baseball venue in Montpelier, Vermont

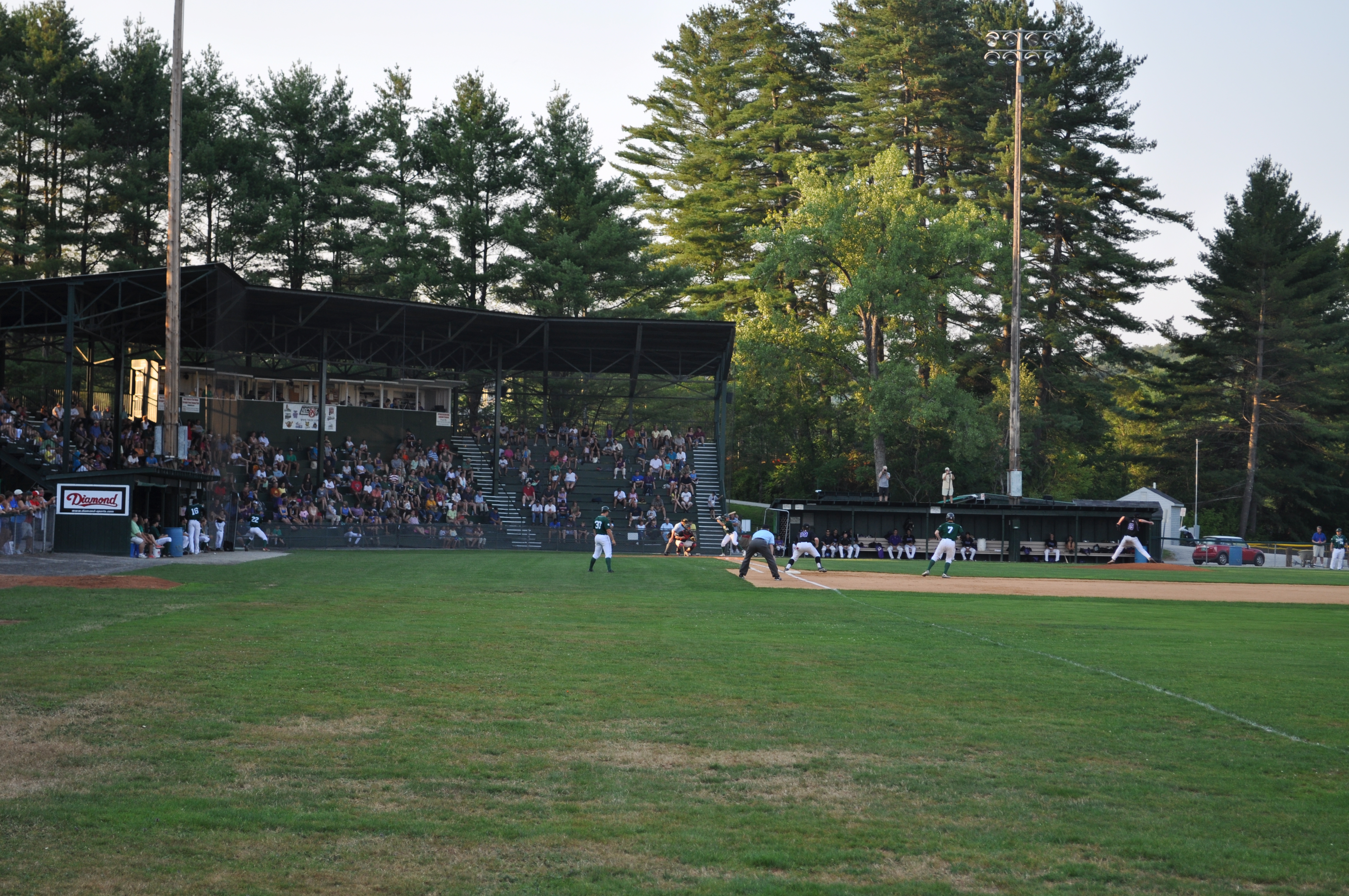
- Interactive map of Montpelier Recreation Field
- Location: Worcester Branch Road and Baseball Drive, Montpelier, Vermont, USA
- Coordinates: 44.279421°N 72.572486°W
- Capacity: 1,200
- Surface: Natural grass
- Scoreboard: Electronic
- Field size: Left Field: 307 feet (94 m); Left Center Field: 347 feet (106 m); Center Field: 419 feet (128 m); Right Center Field: 340 feet (100 m); Right Field: 311 feet (95 m)

Construction
- Built: 1940

Tenant
- Vermont Mountaineers (NECBL) (2003–present)

Montpelier Recreation Field is a baseball venue located in Montpelier, Vermont, United States and is the home field of the Vermont Mountaineers of the New England Collegiate Baseball League. The field has served as home of the Mountaineers since 2003.

== History ==
=== The Montpelier Senators and the Twin City Trojans ===
The field was constructed in 1940 by the Works Progress Administration, with support from the depression-era Federal Government, featuring a 1,200 seat capacity grandstand (which is still in use today) and bleachers down the first base and third base lines. In the first decade of its existence, starting from 1941, it was home to the Montpelier Senators and, later the Twin City Trojans.

=== Robin Roberts ===
During this time, Robin Roberts played at Rec Field for the Twin City Trojans. He remembers his time at the Rec Field fondly: "It was a great experience ... you can't imagine a guy that age having a better summer then we had in Vermont." "We were really good then. I won 17 straight starts that year in Vermont." In 1976 he was inducted into the Baseball Hall of Fame.

=== Vermont Mountaineers ===
When the league folded in 1952 Rec Field endured a half-century without a professional tenant. This ended in 2003 when the New England Collegiate Baseball League voted to award a franchise to a local Montpelier baseball group. Since then the Rec Field has been the home of the Vermont Mountaineers, enjoying high attendances and success on the field, with the Mountaineers reaching the post-season numerous times, winning the NECBL championship in 2006, 2007, and 2015. The Mountaineers are consistently one of the best teams in the NECBL, and set the record for wins in a season in 2022 with 32 wins. The Mountaineers reached the NECBL Finals in that year, before falling to the Martha’s Vineyard Sharks. The Vermont Mountaineers have produced over 50 Major League players, including A.J. Pollock, Tyler Rogers and Nick Martinez.

== Full list of tenants ==
- 1941-1952 – Montpelier Senators of the Second Northern League.
- 1941-1952 – Twin City Trojans of the Second Northern League.
- 2003–present – Vermont Mountaineers of the NECBL.

== Attendance ==
In their inaugural season the Mountaineers enjoyed the highest average attendance in the league and have consistently been near the top of the league in this category since.

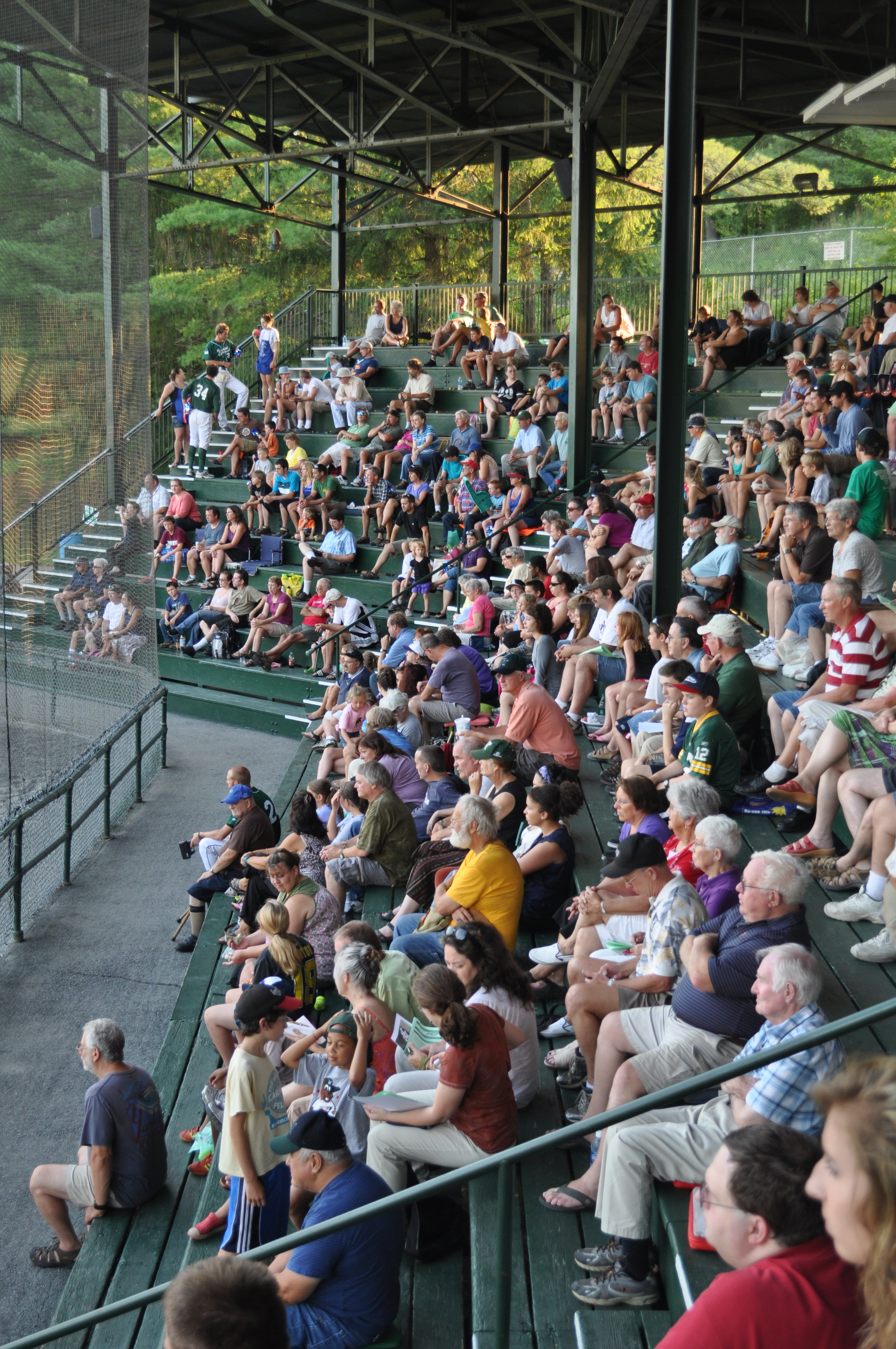
The field's grandstand during a playoff game against the Keene Swamp Bats on August 4, 2012.

Season	Game Avg.	League Rk.
2003	1,666	1st
2004	1,643	3rd
2005	1,707	2nd
2006	1,754	2nd
2007	1,518	3rd
2008	1,720	3rd
2009	1,350	3rd
2010	1,038	4th
2011	1,743	3rd
2012	1,498	2nd

== Notable events ==
- Robin Roberts Night, July 21, 2003. Robin took the mound at the Rec Field for the first time since 1947, throwing out the ceremonial first pitch in front of nearly 3,000 fans.
- The 2004 NECBL All-Star Game drew 4,127 spectators to Montpelier Recreation Field, a then-NECBL record for highest All-Star Game attendance.
- The 2012 NECBL All-Star Game was played at the venue on July 22, 2012.

== Photo gallery ==
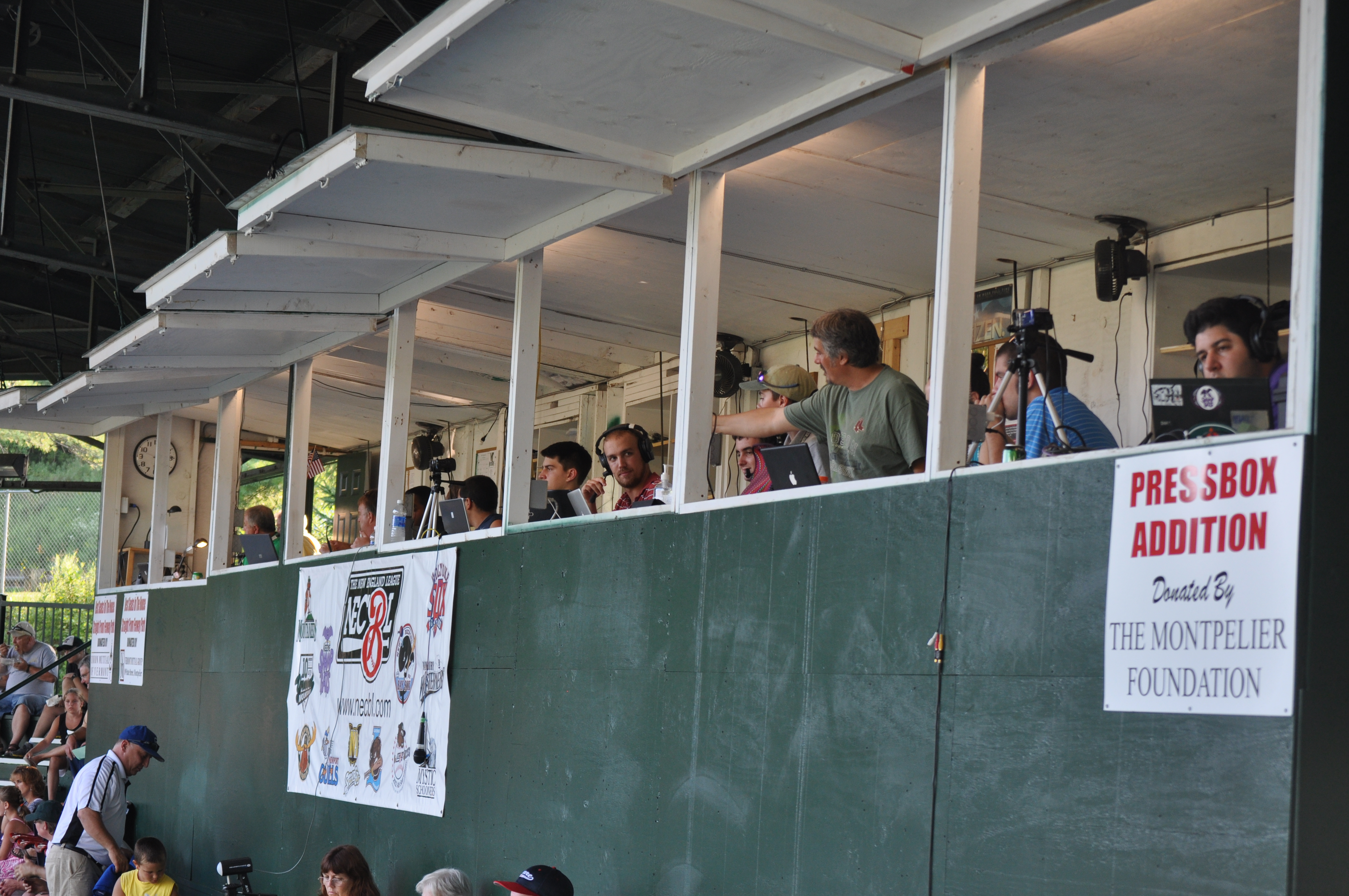

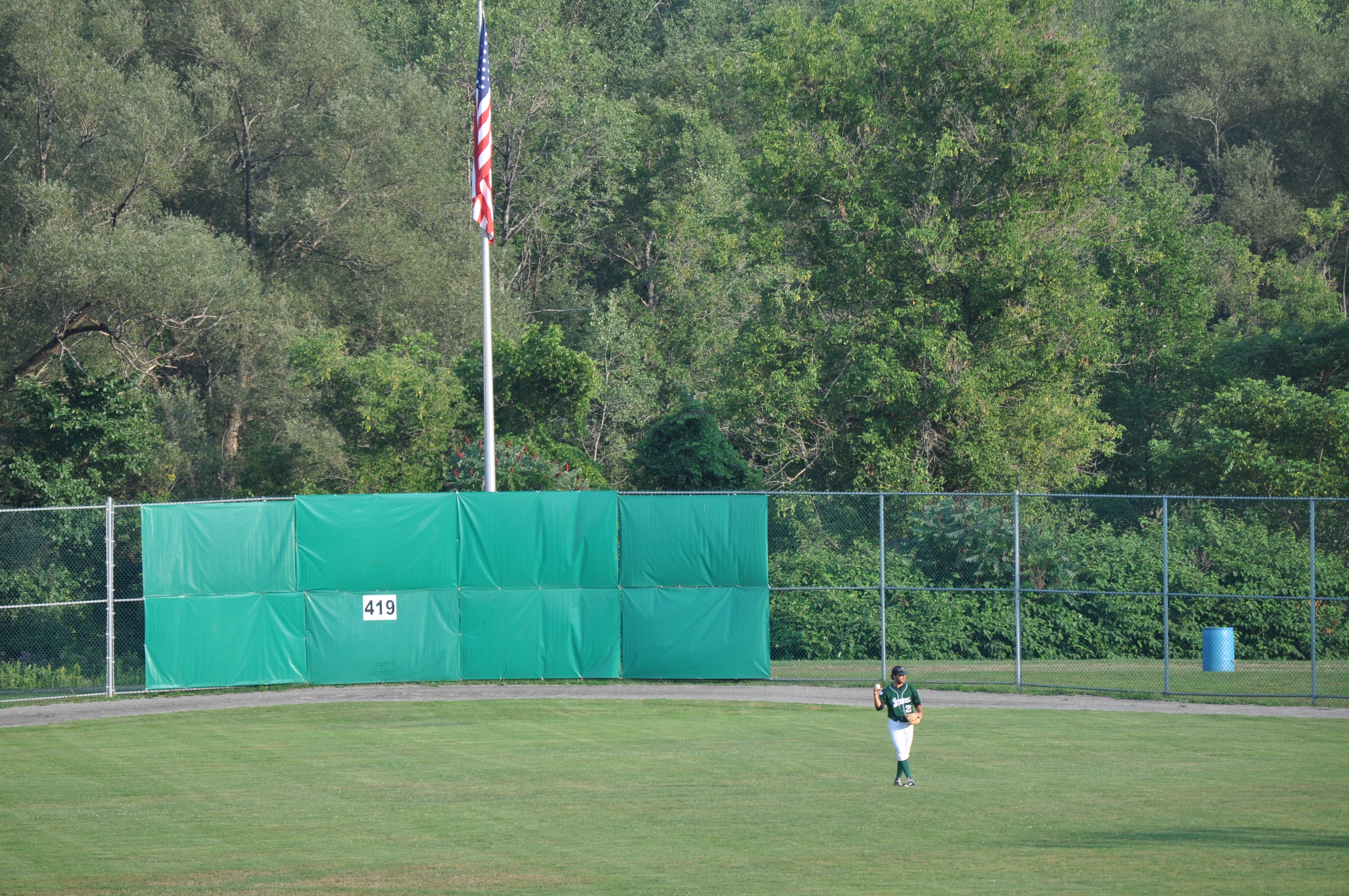

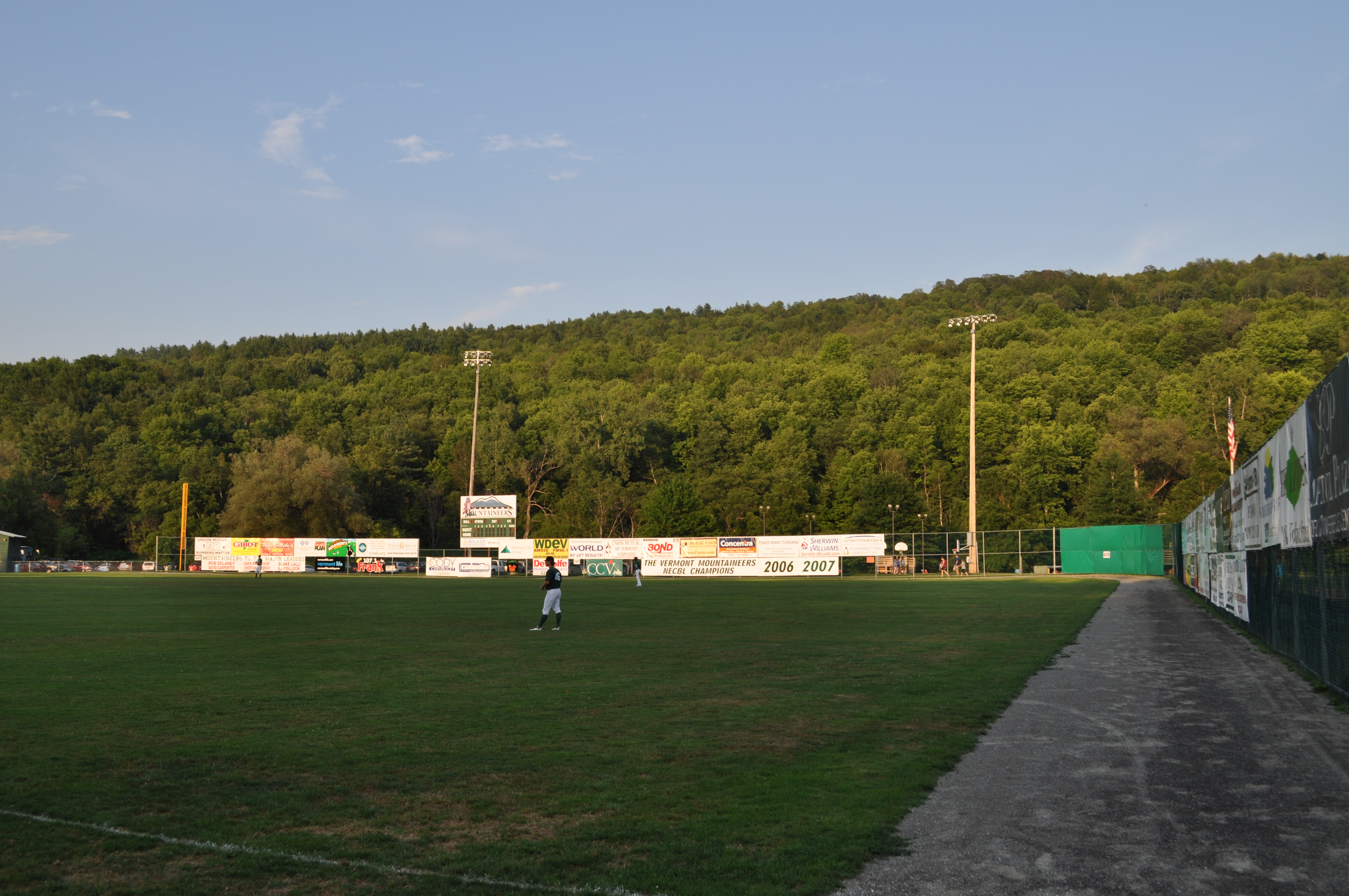
