= Winnipesaukee Muskrats =

American collegiate baseball team

Information
- League: NECBL (Northern Division)
- Location: Laconia, New Hampshire (2010–2022); Manchester, Connecticut (2000–2009)
- Ballpark: Robbie Mills Field (2010–2022)
- Founded: 2000
- Disbanded: 2022
- Former name(s): Laconia Muskrats (2010–2016); Manchester Silkworms (2000–2009)
- Former league(s): NECBL; Southern Division (2004–2008); Western Division (2002); American Division (2001)
- Former ballparks: Northwest Park (2000–2009)
- Colors: Light Blue, Brown, Gold
- Mascot: Marko the Muskrat
- Ownership: Scott Everett, Michael Smith, Peter Erklauer
- General manager: Carey Hough
- Manager: Richard Cesca Jr. (head coach)
- Website: muskratsbaseball.com

The Winnipesaukee Muskrats were a collegiate summer baseball team in Laconia, New Hampshire, playing in the New England Collegiate Baseball League (NECBL), a wood bat league operating in the northeastern United States. The team's home field was Robbie Mills Field in Laconia.

The Muskrats were an expansion franchise that was formed in 1999 and began play as the Manchester Silkworms of Manchester, Connecticut, in the 2000 season. The team moved to Laconia for the 2010 season. The NECBL announced in November 2015 that the team would be called the Winnipesaukee Muskrats (named after the region's Lake Winnipesaukee) in 2016. The Muskrats folded following the 2022 season.

== History ==
=== Manchester Silkworms ===
The Manchester Silkworms began play in 2000 as the third Connecticut-based NECBL team. The Silkworms' high water mark occurred from 2004 to 2008 when they recorded five consecutive playoff appearances. The team hosted the 2004 NECBL All-Star Game and achieved a franchise best 24–17 record in the same season.

=== Laconia Muskrats ===
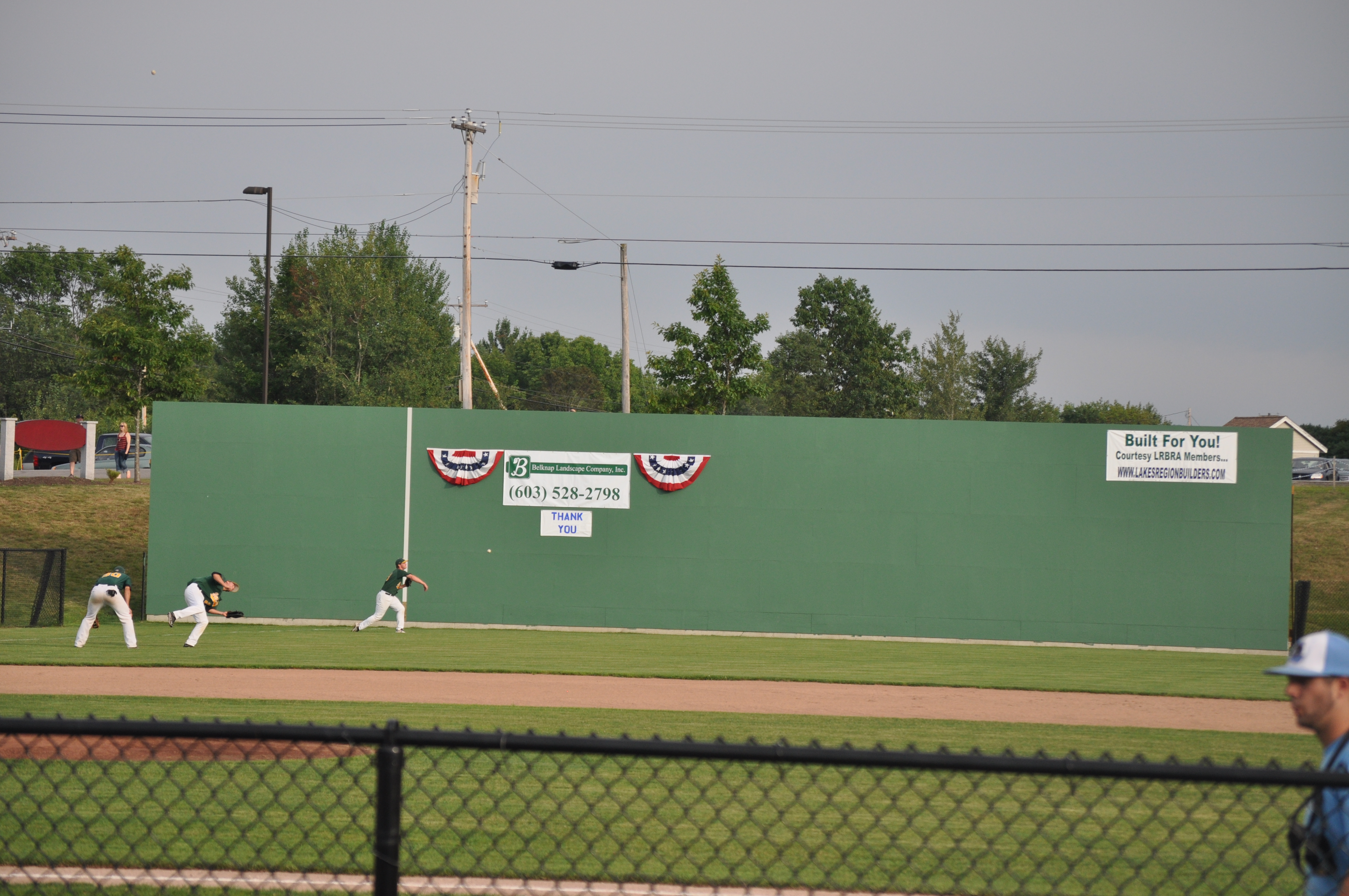
Left field wall prior to renovations

After the 2009 season, Silkworms owner Ed Slegeski sold the franchise to a team of partners led by Jonathan and Noah Crane. The Muskrats name was selected from a Name-the-Team contest. In February 2012, the Laconia Parks and Recreation Commission approved a plan of the Muskrats to sell alcohol in a pavilion beyond left field at Robbie Mills Field that would be separate from general seating. On April 30, the club announced the construction of a manual scoreboard patterned after the Green Monster at Fenway Park in Boston at the left-field fence. The wall, 17 feet (5.2 m) tall and 88 feet (27 m) in length, was built during the 2012 season.

=== Winnipesaukee Muskrats ===
After the 2015 season, new general manager Kristian Svindland changed the name of the team from Laconia to Winnipesaukee, the name of Laconia's "Big Lake", to appeal to the entire region.

The Muskrats folded following the 2022 season after the league's governing board rejected the team's strategy to house players.

== Postseason appearances ==
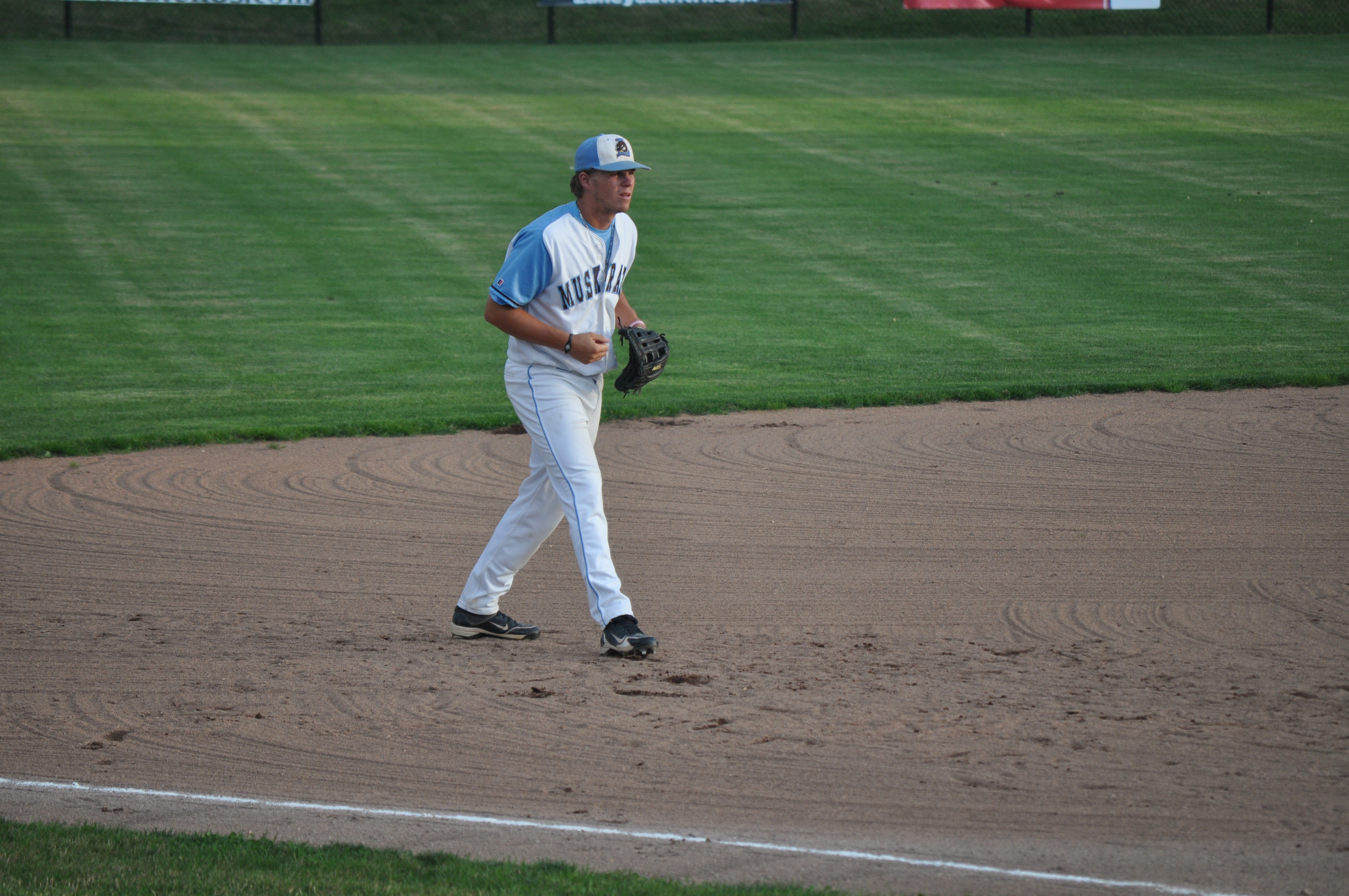
Third baseman Danny Collins, who in 2012 set an NECBL single-season home run record

Year	Division Semi-Finals		Division Finals		NECBL Championship Series	
Manchester Silkworms
2004	Riverpoint Royals	L (1–2)				
2005	North Adams SteepleCats	L (1–2)				
2006	Newport Gulls	L (1–2)				
2007	Torrington Twisters	L (0–2)				
2008	Newport Gulls	L (0–2)				
Laconia Muskrats
2010	Newport Gulls	L (0–2)				
2011	Newport Gulls	W (2–0)	Sanford Mainers	W (2–0)	Keene Swamp Bats	L (0–2)
2012	New Bedford Bay Sox	L (0–2)				
2014	Vermont Mountaineers	L (0–2)				
2015	Vermont Mountaineers	L (0–2)				
Winnipesaukee Muskrats
