= Steve Lombardozzi Jr. =

American baseball player (born 1988)

Steve Lombardozzi
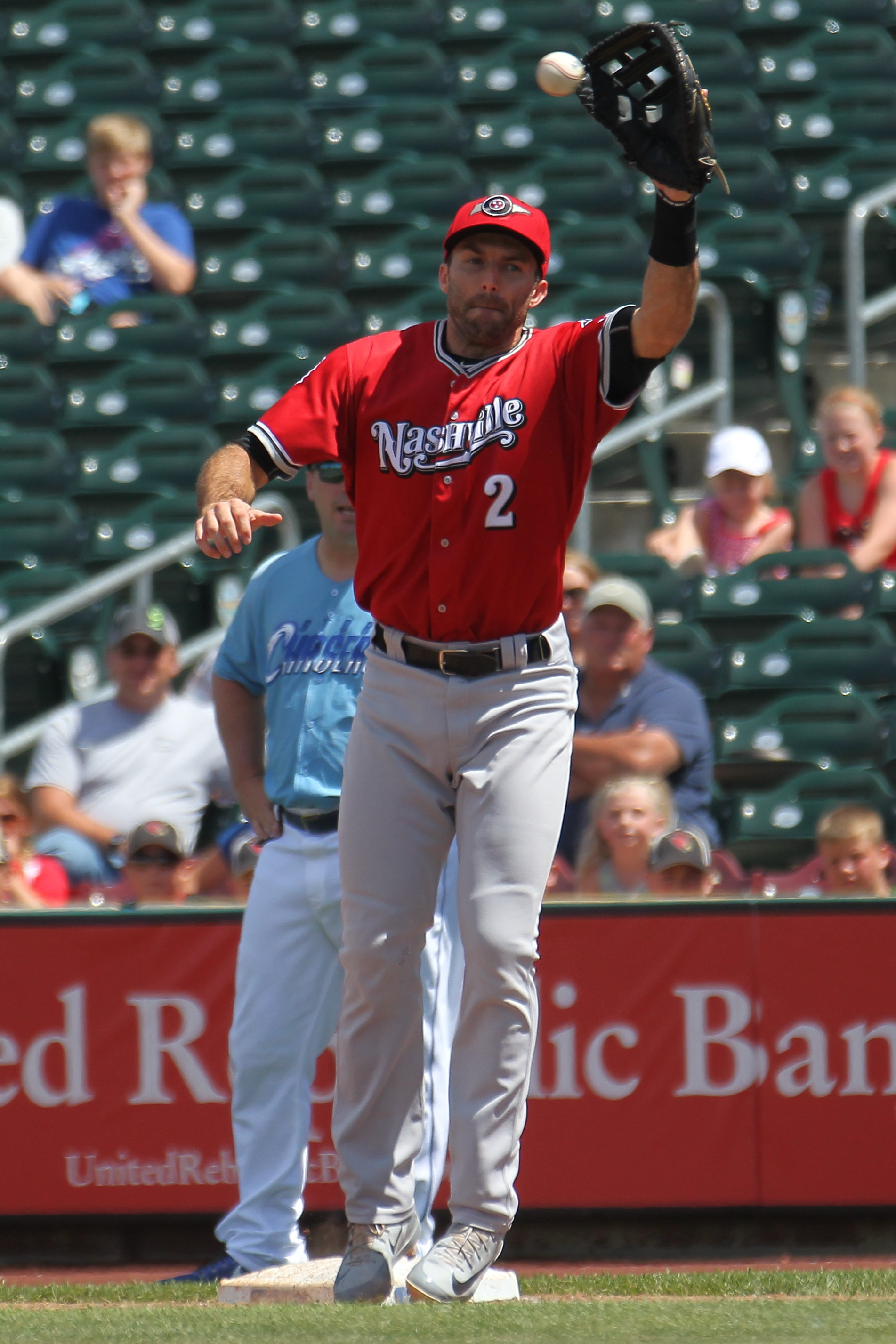
- Lombardozzi with the Nashville Sounds in 2018
- Second baseman / Left fielder
- Born: September 20, 1988 (age 38); Edina, Minnesota, U.S.
- Batted: Switch Threw: Right

MLB debut
- September 6, 2011, for the Washington Nationals

Last MLB appearance
- May 12, 2017, for the Miami Marlins

MLB statistics
- Batting average: .260
- Home runs: 5
- Runs batted in: 52
- Stats at Baseball Reference

Teams
- Washington Nationals (2011–2013); Baltimore Orioles (2014); Pittsburgh Pirates (2015); Miami Marlins (2017)

Stephen Anthony Paul Lombardozzi Jr. (born September 20, 1988) is an American former professional baseball second baseman and left fielder. He played in Major League Baseball (MLB) for the Washington Nationals, Baltimore Orioles, Pittsburgh Pirates, and Miami Marlins.

== Career ==
=== Washington Nationals ===
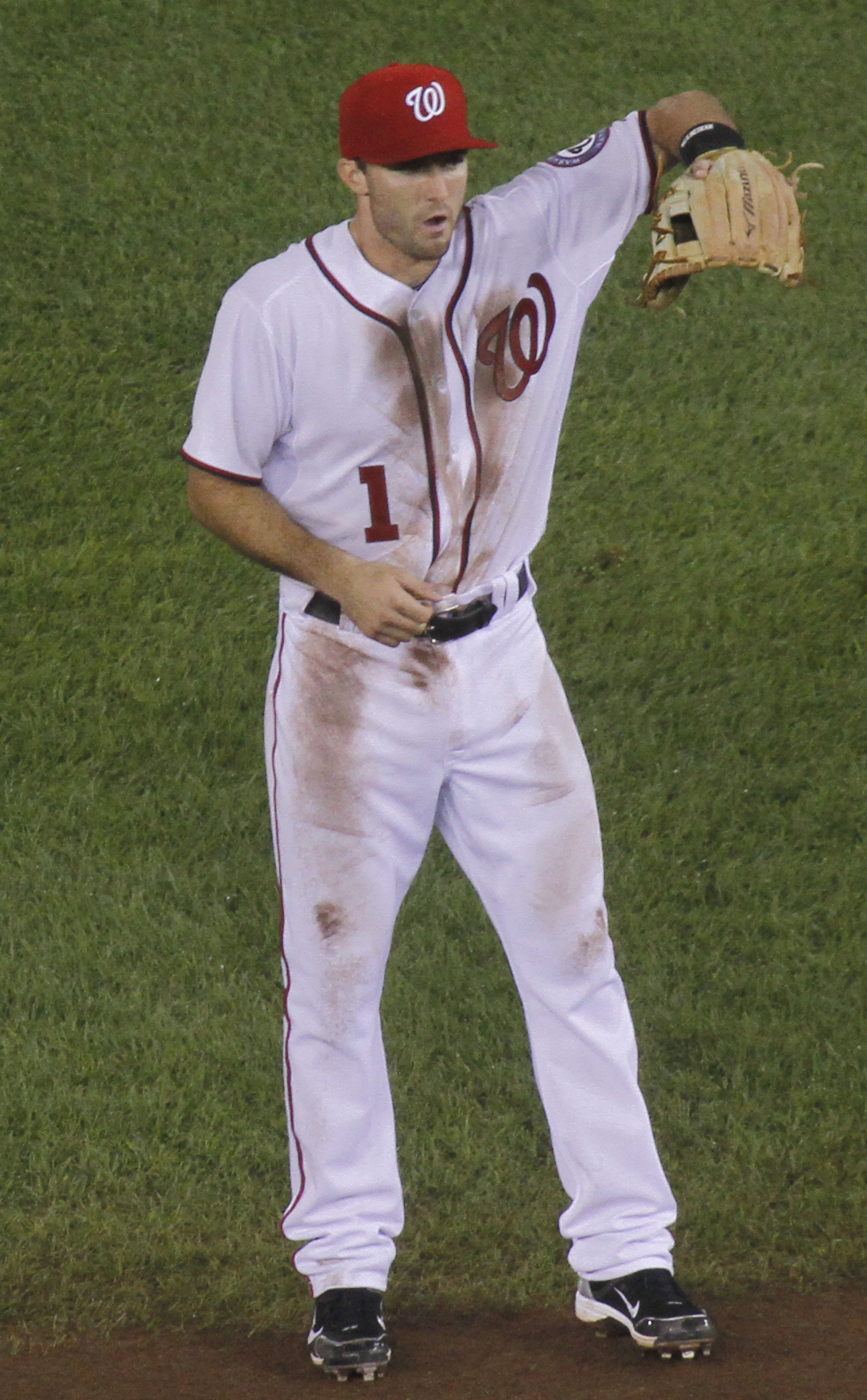
Lombardozzi with the Washington Nationals in 2011

Lombardozzi graduated from Atholton High School in 2007. A player on the school's varsity baseball team, he was named a preseason third-team Rawlings high school All-American in 2005. Lombardozzi was playing with the Holyoke Blue Sox in the New England Collegiate Baseball League (NECBL) when he was selected by the Washington Nationals in the 19th round (571st overall) of the 2008 Major League Baseball draft out of St. Petersburg College.

Lombardozzi spent 2009 with the Single–A Hagerstown Suns and recorded a .296 batting average with three home runs, 58 runs batted in (RBI), and 16 stolen bases in 126 games. Prior to the 2010 season, Lombardozzi was ranked as the Nationals' 15th best prospect. He split the season between the High–A Potomac Nationals and Double–A Harrisburg Senators, hitting .293 with six home runs, 49 RBI, 35 doubles, 11 triples, and 24 stolen bases in 137 games. After reporting back to Harrisburg to start the 2011 season, Lombardozzi earned a promotion to the Triple-A Syracuse Chiefs after hitting .309 in 65 games. He was called up to the ajor leagues for the first time on September 6, 2011.

Lombardozzi made the Nationals' Opening Day roster for the 2012 season after a productive spring. His productivity continued into the regular season with a .333 batting average as a semi-regular through May 20. On June 4, 2013 he hit his first career walk-off, a sacrifice fly in a 3–2 victory over the Mets.

=== Baltimore Orioles ===
On December 2, 2013, Lombardozzi was traded to the Detroit Tigers, along with pitchers Ian Krol and Robbie Ray, in exchange for starting pitcher Doug Fister.

On March 24, 2014, before playing in a regular–season game with the Tigers, Lombardozzi was traded to the Baltimore Orioles in exchange for Alex Gonzalez. On March 29, it was announced that Lombardozzi had made the Opening Day roster for the Orioles. He was optioned to the Triple–A Norfolk Tides on May 1 when Manny Machado returned from the disabled list. In 20 games for Baltimore, Lombardozzi slashed .288/.297/.329 with two RBI and one stolen base. On December 8, Lombardozzi was removed from the 40–man roster and sent outright to Norfolk.

=== Pittsburgh Pirates ===
Lombardozzi was acquired by the Pittsburgh Pirates on February 3, 2015. On May 6, the Pirates selected Lombardozzi's contract, adding him to their active roster. In 12 games for Pittsburgh, he went 0–for–10 with 1 walk. Lombardozzi was designated for assignment following the acquisition of Aramis Ramírez on July 23. He cleared waivers and was sent outright to the Triple–A Indianapolis Indians on July 29. Lombardozzi elected free agency on October 5.

=== Southern Maryland Blue Crabs ===
On October 26, 2015, the Chicago White Sox signed Lombardozzi to a minor league contract with an invitation to spring training. He was released by the White Sox on March 31, 2016.

On April 17, 2016, Lombardozzi signed with the Southern Maryland Blue Crabs of the Atlantic League of Professional Baseball. In 40 games, he hit .368/.401/.428 with no home runs, 20 RBI and eight stolen bases.

=== Washington Nationals (second stint) ===
On June 7, 2016, Lombardozzi signed a minor league contract with the Washington Nationals organization. He was assigned to the Triple–A Syracuse Chiefs, where he hit .253/.299/.293 with seven RBI and three stolen bases across 62 appearances. Lombardozzi elected free agency following the season on November 7.

=== Miami Marlins ===
On February 28, 2017, Lombardozzi signed a minor league contract with the Miami Marlins. On May 10, the Marlins selected Lombardozzi's contract, adding him to their active roster. In 2 games for Miami, he went 0–for–8. Lombardozzi was designated for assignment following the acquisition of Christian Colón on May 16. He cleared waivers and was sent outright to the Triple–A New Orleans Zephyrs on May 19. Lombardozzi elected free agency on October 2.

=== Oakland Athletics ===
On January 8, 2018, Lombardozzi signed a minor league contract with the Oakland Athletics. In 120 games for the Triple–A Nashville Sounds, he batted .243/.323/.301 with one home run and 42 RBI. Lombardozzi elected free agency following the season on November 2.

=== Long Island Ducks ===
On March 28, 2019, Lombardozzi signed a deal with the Long Island Ducks of the Atlantic League of Professional Baseball. In 74 games for Long Island, he batted .262/.346/.346 with two home runs, 33 RBI, and four stolen bases. Lombardozzi became a free agent following the season, but later re-signed with the Ducks for the 2020 season. He did not play in a game in 2020 due to the cancellation of the Atlantic League season because of the COVID-19 pandemic.

In 2021, Lombardozzi hit .329 with 83 RBI, 20 stolen bases, and a league-leading 90 walks. He was named the Atlantic League Player of the Year following the season. He became a free agent following the season.

=== Kane County Cougars ===
On May 17, 2022, Lombardozzi signed with the Kane County Cougars of the American Association of Professional Baseball. Lombardozzi appeared in 38 games for the Cougars, during which he hit .301 with 2 home runs and 18 RBI. On July 4, Lombardozzi was released by the Cougars.

== Personal life ==
His father, Steve Lombardozzi, played in the majors from 1985 to 1990.

== See also ==
- List of second-generation Major League Baseball players
