= Central Mass Collegians =

Information
- Location: Leominster, Massachusetts
- Ballpark: Doyle Field
- Founded: 1995
- Disbanded: 1999
- League championships: 2 (1995, 1996)
- Former league: NECBL (1995–99)

The Central Mass Collegians were a summer collegiate baseball team located in Leominster, Massachusetts playing in the New England Collegiate Baseball League, a wood bat collegiate summer baseball league operating in the northeastern United States region of New England. The team played from 1995 to 1999 and won back-to-back NECBL Championships in 1995 and 1996.

== Postseason appearances ==
Year	Division Finals*		NECBL Championship Series	
Central Mass Collegians
1995	Danbury Westerners	W (2-0)	Waterbury Barons	W (2-0)
1996	Middletown Giants	W (2-0)	Danbury Westerners	W (2-1)

- The NECBL did not separate into divisions until 2001.
- Eric Pastore of http://www.digitalballparks.com has stated that according to the Minutes of the April 2, 1998 NECBL meeting... it states that the Central Massachusetts Collegians will be officially moving from Worcester to Leominster for the 1998 season. www.Digitalballparks.com believes that through the first 3 seasons of their existence (including their 2 Championships), that they were played at Tivnan Field @ Lake Park and didn't begin playing their first games @ Doyle Field in Leominster until 1998.
