= Vermont Mountaineers =

Collegiate summer baseball team in Montpelier, Vermont, USA

Logo
Cap insignia

Information
- League: NECBL (Northern Division)
- Location: Montpelier, Vermont
- Ballpark: Montpelier Recreation Field
- Founded: 2003
- Nickname(s): Mountaineers, Neers
- Post-Season Division championships: 6 (2005, 2006, 2007, 2009, 2015, 2022)
- Regular-Season Division championships: 4 (2006, 2015, 2022, 2024)
- League championships: 3 (2006, 2007, 2015)
- Colors: Green, Black, White
- Mascot: Skip
- Ownership: Board of Directors
- Management: Brian Gallagher (GM)
- Manager: Brian Murphy
- Media: Varies
- Website: thevermontmountaineers.com

The Vermont Mountaineers are a collegiate summer baseball team based in Montpelier, Vermont. The team is a member of the New England Collegiate Baseball League that plays their home games at Montpelier Recreation Field. In 2022, the Mountaineers broke the NECBL record for a total of 32 wins in a single season.

== History ==
In 2001, local citizens formed "Green Mountain Community Baseball", an organization formed in hopes of attracting an NECBL franchise to Montpelier, Vermont. In September of the following year the NECBL voted to branch out Vermont, and to award a franchise to the group. The team's name, the Vermont Mountaineers, was chosen from more than 300 fan entries.

General Manager Brian Gallagher spear-headed organizing the franchise and led the team since its inception. John Russo was the team's manager at inception and for the better part of the first decade of existence, and various managers including Joe Brown and Mitch Holmes followed over the years.

The team's first game was on June 7, 2003, an 8-5 loss to the Manchester Silkworms. The game's attendance of 2,471 set a then-NECBL record for single game attendance. Although their inaugural season was not a success on the field (the Mountaineers had the second-worst record in the NECBL), it was in terms of attendance, with the club leading the league in average attendance per game. Nearly 35,000 fans watched the Mountaineers at Montpelier Recreation Field that season.

After reaching the playoffs in 2004, the team has enjoyed playoff success, qualifying for the playoffs in six of their first seven seasons. They have reached the NECBL Championship Series six times (2005, 2006, 2007, 2009, 2015, 2022) winning it three times (2006, 2007), 2015). Three of their six finals appearances have come against the Newport Gulls.

== Postseason appearances ==
Year	Division Semi-Finals		Division Finals		NECBL Championship Series	
Vermont Mountaineers
2004	Keene Swamp Bats	L (0-2)				
2005	Holyoke Giants	W (2-0)	Keene Swamp Bats	W (2-1)	Newport Gulls	L (0-2)
2006	Holyoke Giants	W (2-0)	Sanford Mainers	W (2-1)	Torrington Twisters	W (2-0)
2007	Keene Swamp Bats	W (2-0)	Holyoke Giants	W (2-0)	Newport Gulls	W (2-0)
2008	Sanford Mainers	L (1-2)				
2009	North Adams SteepleCats	W (2-0)	Holyoke Blue Sox	W (2-0)	Newport Gulls	L (1-2)
2011	Holyoke Blue Sox	L (0-2)				
2012	Keene Swamp Bats	L (0-2)				
2013	North Adams SteepleCats	W (2-0)	Keene Swamp Bats	L (1-2)		
2014	Laconia Muskrats	W (2-0)	Sanford Mainers	L (2-0)		
2015	Laconia Muskrats	W (2-0)	North Adams SteepleCats	W (2-1)	Mystic Schooners	W (2-1)
2022			Sanford Mainers	W (2-1)	Martha's Vineyard Sharks	L (0-2)
2023	Danbury Westerners	L (0-2)				
2024	Martha's Vineyard Sharks	W (2-0)	Sanford Mainers	L (2-0)		

== Records ==
Below is a list of all-time New England Collegiate Baseball League records set by the Mountaineers.

=== Team ===
- Most triple plays in a season – 2, against the Keene Swamp Bats
- Stolen bases in a game – 11 against the Manchester Silkworms on 7/31/08.
- Stolen bases in a season – 118, 2011.
- Runs in a game – 26, 2012 (Record shared with two (2) other teams).
- Runs in a game, combined – 41, 2012
- Sacrifice Hit - 38 2017

=== Individual ===
- Sacrifice Bunts – 11 by Matt Smith, 2004 and Zach Babitt, 2010.
- Most saves – 16 by Mark Murray, 2006.

== Awards ==
=== End-of-season awards ===
- 2004 Top Relief Pitcher – McKenzie Willoughby (co-winner)
- 2005 Sportsmanship Award – Matt Rizzotti
- 2005 Manager of the Year – John Russo
- 2006 Defensive Player of the Year – Curt Smith
- 2006 Top Relief Pitcher – Mark Murray
- 2006 Sportsmanship Award – Robbie Minor
- 2006 Rookie of the Year – Chris Friedrich
- 2007 10th Player Award – A. J. Pollock
- 2008 Most Improved Player – Alejandro Balsinde
- 2014 Rookie of the Year – Blake Tiberi

=== All-NECBL Team ===
- 2005 – First Team: 1B Matt Rizzotti; Second Team: 3B Miguel Magrass.
- 2006 – First Team: P Joe Esposito, SS Robbie Minor, P Mark Murray, 3B Curt Smith, C Zach Zaneski; Second Team: P Chris Friedrich, 2B Troy Krider.
- 2007 – First Team: 1B Mike Sheridan, DH Curt Smith; Second team OF AJ Pollock.
- 2008 – Second Team P Casey Harman.
- 2009 – First Team OF Henry Dunn, C Jayson Hernandez; Second Team P Rob Kumbatovic.

== Attendance ==
From their inception the Mountaineers have had some of the league's largest attendance figures. In their inaugural season the Mountaineers enjoyed the highest average attendance in the league and have consistently been near the top of the league in this category since.

=== Attendance figures ===
Season	Game Avg.	League Rk.
2003	1,666	1st
2004	1,643	3rd
2005	1,707	2nd
2006	1,754	2nd
2007	1,518	3rd
2008	1,720	3rd
2009	1,350	3rd
2010	1,038	4th
2011	1,743	3rd
2012	1,498	2nd
2013	1,276	3rd
2014	1,088	4th
2015	1,186	3rd
2016	1,087	4th
2017	1,168	4th
2018	1,252	4th
2019	915	5th
2021	1,425	2nd
2022	1,748	2nd
2023	1,319	4th
2024	1,301	4th
2025	1,288	5th

=== 2004 All-Star Game ===
The 2004 NECBL All-Star Game drew 4,127 fans to Montpelier Recreation Field, which set a then-NECBL record for All-Star Game attendance. Vermont's Northern Division squad was defeated by the Southern Division 7-4. The record has since been broken at the 2009 NECBL All-Star Game hosted by the Holyoke Blue Sox. The 2009 game attracted 4,906 fans to Mackenzie Stadium in Holyoke, Massachusetts. However, the mark set in 2004 remains a Montpelier Recreation Field record.

== Pro alumni ==
Below is a list of Mountaineers alumni who have gone on to play professional baseball. In total, over 103 former Mountaineers have signed professional contracts after playing for Vermont. 13 have reached the majors, with two players currently on active MLB rosters.

As of August 1, 2018.

=== Reached the Majors ===
Player	Year w/ VER	Current/Most recent team	Active
A.J. Pollock	2007	San Francisco Giants	Yes
Rob Delaney	2005	Tampa Bay Rays	No
David Carpenter	2005	Texas Rangers	No
Darin Mastroianni	2004-05	Minnesota Twins	No
Blake Lalli	2004	Arizona Diamondbacks	No
Christian Friedrich	2006	San Diego Padres	No
Michael Brady	2006-07	Oakland Athletics	No
Nick Greenwood	2008	Minnesota Twins	No
Nick Martinez	2009-10	San Diego Padres	Yes
Micah Johnson	2010	Atlanta Braves	No
Matt Duffy	2010	Texas Rangers	No
Cody Ege	2011	Los Angeles Angels	No
Troy Scribner	2011	Arizona Diamondbacks	No
Brian O'Grady	2012	San Diego Padres	No
Tyler Rogers	2012	San Francisco Giants	Yes
Danny Mendick	2013	New York Mets	Yes
Nick Solak	2014	Detroit Tigers	Yes (AAA)
Trey Amburgey	2014	Cincinnati Reds	Yes (AAA)
Joe Jacques	2016	Boston Red Sox	Yes (AAA)
Jonathan Stiever	2016	Chicago White Sox	Yes (AAA)

=== National teams ===
- Simon Rosenbaum, 2015, active with Team Israel.

=== Broadcasting ===
The following former Mountaineer broadcasters have gone on to broadcast in professional baseball: Tim Hagerty-AAA (Mountaineers 2003), Kyle Berger-A (2004), Scott Montesano -Ind. (2005), Jonathan Barr-Ind. (2006), Paul Roper-Ind. (2007, currently broadcasting in the OHL), Carmine Vetrano -AHL/FHL/CanAm. (2010, currently broadcasting in American Hockey League, Federal Hockey League, and Can-Am League),

== Media ==
Wcax.com, an area online news website run by WCAX-TV, produces reports and video highlights of Mountaineers games. The Barre Montpelier Times Argus, a local newspaper, also provides press coverage of games. The games are broadcast on the NECBL Broadcast Network.
