= Newport Gulls =

American collegiate baseball team

Logo
Cap insignia

Information
- League: NECBL (South Division)
- Location: Newport, RI (2001–present); Cranston, RI (1998–2000)
- Ballpark: Cardines Field (2001–present)
- Founded: 1998
- Post-Season Division championships: 13 (2001, 2002, 2004, 2005, 2007, 2008, 2009, 2012, 2013, 2014, 2022, 2023, 2024)
- Regular-Season Division championships: 13 (2001, 2002, 2005, 2006, 2008, 2009, 2011, 2012, 2013, 2015, 2022, 2023, 2024)
- League championships: 8 (2001, 2002, 2005, 2009, 2012, 2014, 2023, 2024)
- Former name: Newport Gulls (2001–present); Rhode Island Gulls (1998–2000)
- Former leagues: NECBL; Coastal Division (2016–2024); Eastern Division (2003, 2009–2013); Southern Division (2002, 2004–2008, 2014–2015); American Division (2001)
- Former ballpark: Cranston Stadium (1998–2000)
- Colors: Blue Orange Black
- Mascot: Gully & Gully Jr.
- Ownership: Chuck Paiva, Chris Patsos; Ron Westmoreland, Greg Fater, Mark Horan
- General manager: Chuck Paiva
- Manager: Mike Coombs
- Media: Mikey Basile
- Website: newportgulls.com

The Newport Gulls are a wooden-bat, collegiate summer baseball team based in Newport, Rhode Island. The Newport Gulls Baseball Club is a member of the Coastal Division of the New England Collegiate Baseball League. Since 2001, the Gulls have played at Cardines Field.

== History ==
An NECBL expansion team, the club was founded in Cranston in 1998. The Gulls have been one of the NECBL's most successful teams since their inception, winning eight Fay Vincent, Sr. Cups as champions of the NECBL, and eleven division titles.

While most teams playing at Cardines average attendance in the dozens or, at most, a few hundred per game, the Newport Gulls, since moving to Newport in 2001, have helped bring the field back to its former glory days of the mid-twentieth century, averaging over 2,300 fans for a regular-season home game. During the 2004 season alone, the Gulls attracted over 50,000 fans through just 26 home games, with sellout crowds in excess of 3,000 people. Following the 2006 season, the Gulls set a team and league record (since surpassed) for regular season home attendance, totaling 42,424 fans after 21 games, along with the league's all-time best win–loss record of 32–10. For the 2024 season, the Gulls ranked 13th in all of summer collegiate baseball with an average attendance of 2,676 per game, second in the NECBL to the ninth-ranked Martha's Vineyard Sharks. In 15 seasons in Newport, the Gulls have never failed to win fewer than 25 regular season games.

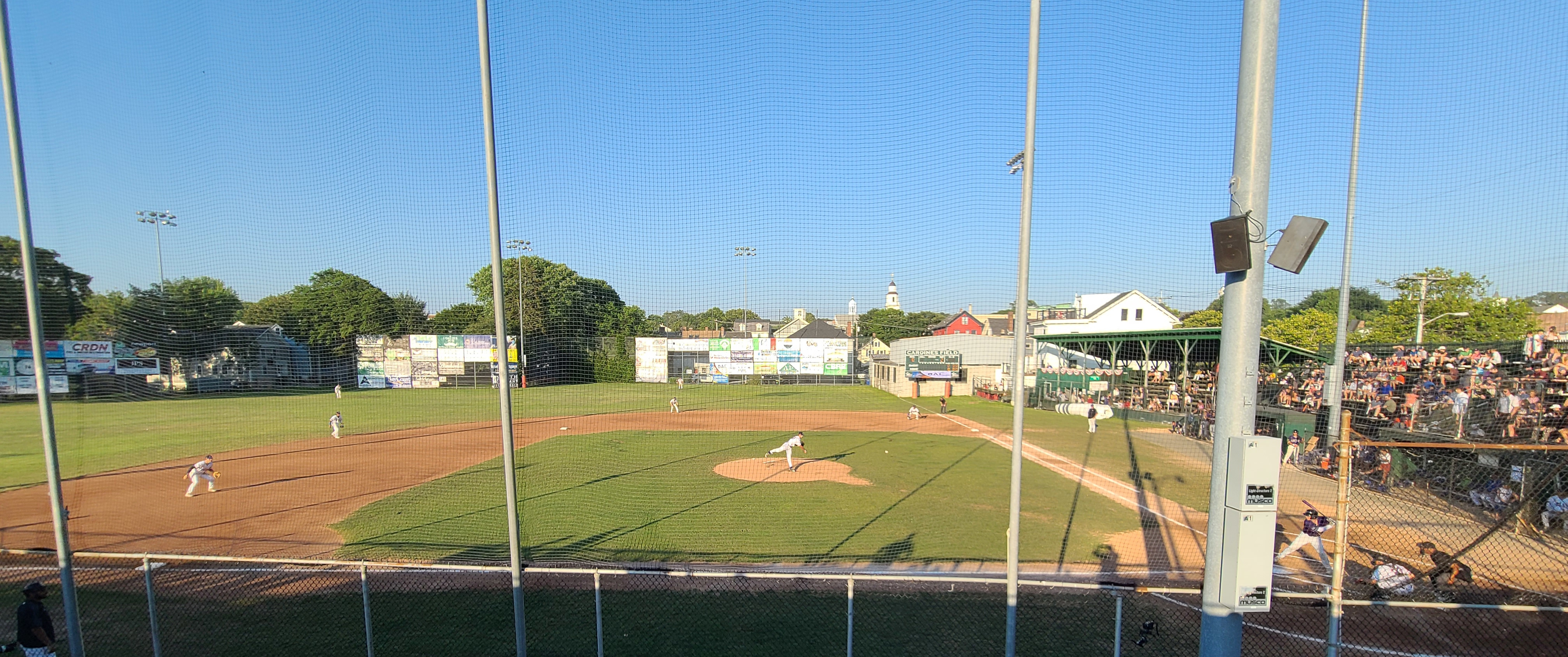
Gulls in action against the Martha's Vineyard Sharks

Newport Gulls games often feature fan participation activities between innings, along with concessions, low ticket prices, and a safe atmosphere. This reputation has only added to their popularity, not only among tourists passing through Newport, but with many Aquidneck Island children and families, as well. The active crowds, historic atmosphere, and competent club management have allowed the Gulls to recruit some of the best college baseball players in the nation, with talent rivaling the Cape Cod League. Since 2001, Cardines Field has hosted the Gulls through 13 regular season division titles, 13 postseason division titles, and 8 league championships, along with other notable awards, such as the RI Governor's Cup, Pell Bridge Series Championship, and Dunkin' Donuts Cup. The Gulls formerly had an annual tradition of playing Team USA in an exhibition around Independence Day every July, in what was often a sellout game. In July 2005, the Gulls hosted the NECBL All-Star Game and Home Run Derby at Cardines, which was a major event for the park, the league, and the City of Newport. The Gulls have hosted the NECBL All-Star Game and Home Run Derby four times, in 2005, 2010, 2016, and 2021.

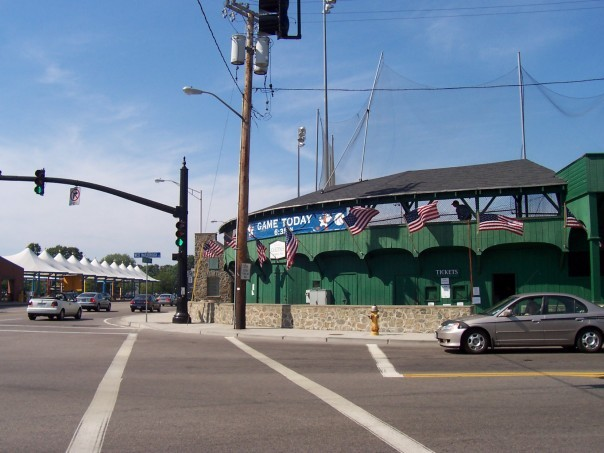
Cardines undergoing pregame preparation on a Gulls game night

The Gulls and the NECBL as a whole have received national attention with the addition of live Internet video webcasts to the normal audio webcast of games, effectively doing so at minimum cost in infrastructure. On opening night of the 2006 NECBL season, the Newport Gulls were the first to implement this new technology, bringing summer collegiate baseball, as well as Cardines Field, into a new era. These changes and improvements were implemented under the direction of team Director of Broadcast Operations and Media Relations Nicholas Lima from 2005 to 2015.

The Fighting Gull

The attention is not frowned upon for Gulls players, who, as amateur college athletes, hope to be drafted by Major League Baseball teams. The recent surge in recognition and popularity of the Newport Gulls organization throughout the professional baseball world has provided for an increase in the number of Gulls players to be drafted every year. The professionalism and expanse of the Gulls media operations has made it a model summer collegiate teams around the country attempt to emulate, and the Gulls internship program is considered a premier stepping stone for college students seeking a career in sports management.

The Gulls are the most successful franchise in NECBL history, having won the Fay Vincent Sr. Cup in 2001, 2002, 2005, 2009, 2012, 2014, 2023, and most recently in 2024. The 2012 Gulls were Perfect Game's unofficial national champion, and NECBL's first team to be so honored.

=== Attendance ===
The following is a list of Gulls attendance figures at Cardines Field dating back to the 2001 season, when the team began using the facility.

Home attendance
Season	Game avg.	Season total	Lge. rk.
2001	676	11,491	4th
2002	792	16,640	5th
2003	1,200	21,604	4th
2004	1,798	35,963	2nd
2005	1,687	33,759	3rd
2006	2,020	42,424	1st
2007	2,010	42,225	1st
2008	2,101	44,123	1st
2009	2,277	45,547	1st
2010	2,284	45,683	1st
2011	2,146	42,913	2nd
2012	2,126	38,275	1st
2013	1,939	40,714	1st
2014	2,332 (Note: NECBL Records.)	46,645	1st
2015	2,104	46,290	
2016	2,086	45,904	
2017	1,823	40,113	
2018	2,093	46,052	
2019	2,190	48,183	
2020	COVID	suspended	season
2021	2,123	48,698	
2022	2,345	51,608	
2023	2,968	65,297	
2024	2,676	53,522	2nd

=== Managers and record ===
Managers and regular season won-loss records
Season	Manager	Won-Loss	Career Record
2001	Carmen Carcone	25–15	25–15
2002	Terry Allvord	25–17	25–17
2003	Terry Rupp	25–15	25–15
2004	Dennis Healy	26–15	26–15
2005	Tom Atkinson, Mike Coombs	25–16	25–16
2006	Mike Coombs	32–10	57–26
2007	Mike Coombs	25–17	82–43
2008	Mike Coombs	26–16	108–59
2009	Mike Coombs	31–10	139–69
2010	Mike Coombs	27–15	166–84
2011	Mike Coombs	29–13	195–97
2012	Mike Coombs	31–10	226–107
2013	Mike Coombs	30–14	256–121
2014	Mike Coombs	25–17	281–138
2015	Mike Coombs	27–15	308–153
2016	Al Leyva	25–19	25–19
2017	Al Leyva	20-22	45–41
2018	Mike Coombs	21–23	329–176
2019	Kevin Winterrowd	27–17	27–17
2020	COVID	suspended	season
2021	Kevin Winterrowd	22-20	49–37
2022	Fank Holbrook	30–14	30–14
2023	Frank Holbrook	32–12	62–26
2024	Mike Coombs		

== Postseason appearances ==
Year	Division Semi-Finals (Note: The NECBL had 3 divisions in 2022, and that season's first playoff round consisted of only a single game.)		Division Finals (Note: The NECBL did not separate into divisions until 2001.)		NECBL Championship Series	
Rhode Island Gulls
2000			Mill City All-Americans	W (2–1)	Keene Swamp Bats	L (1–2)
Newport Gulls
2001			Eastern Tides	W (2–1)	Keene Swamp Bats	W (2–1)
2002	North Adams Steeplecats	W (2–1)	Danbury Westerners	W (2–0)	Keene Swamp Bats	W (2–0)
2003	Danbury Westerners	W (2–1)	Torrington Twisters	L (0–2)		
2004	Torrington Twisters	W (2–1)	Riverpoint Royals	W (2–1)	Sanford Mainers	L (1–2)
2005	Danbury Westerners	W (2–0)	North Adams Steeplecats	W (2–0)	Vermont Mountaineers	W (2–0)
2006	Manchester Silkworms	W (2–1)	Torrington Twisters	L (0–2)		
2007	North Adams Steeplecats	W (2–1)	Torrington Twisters	W (2–0)	Vermont Mountaineers	L (0–2)
2008	Manchester Silkworms	W (2–0)	Pittsfield Dukes	W (2–0)	Sanford Mainers	L (0–2)
2009	New Bedford Bay Sox	W (2–0)	Sanford Mainers	W (2–1)	Vermont Mountaineers	W (2–1)
2010	Laconia Muskrats	W (2–0)	North Shore Navigators	L (1–2)		
2011	Laconia Muskrats	L (0–2)				
2012	Sanford Mainers	W (2–1)	New Bedford Bay Sox	W (2–0)	Danbury Westerners	W (2–0)
2013	Sanford Mainers	W (2–0)	Mystic Schooners	W (2–0)	Keene Swamp Bats	L (1–2)
2014	Ocean State Waves	W (2–1)	Plymouth Pilgrims	W (2–1)	Sanford Mainers	W (2–0)
2015	Ocean State Waves	W (2–1)	Mystic Schooners	L (0–2)		
2016	Danbury Westerners	W (2-1)	Mystic Schooners	L (0-2)		
2019	Mystic Schooners	W (1-0)	Martha's Vineyard Sharks	L (1-2)		
2022	Sanford Mainers	L (0–1)				
2023	Ocean State Waves	W (2–1)	Danbury Westerners	W (2–0)	Bristol Blues	W (2–0)
2024	Valley Blue Sox	W (2–0)	Bristol Blues	W (2–0)	Sanford Mainers	W (2–1)
2025	Mystic Schooners	W (2-1)	Martha's Vineyard Sharks	L (1-2)		
2026	Bristol Blues	L (1-2)				

== Notable players ==
Notable Newport Gulls
Year	Player	MLB Team	University
1999	Jason Szuminski (Note: A Rhode Island Gull.)	San Diego Padres	MIT
2003	Chris Ianetta (Note: Member, Newport Gulls Hall of Fame.) (Note: Member, NECBL Hall of Fame.)	Los Angeles Angels	University of North Carolina
2004	Mitchell Boggs	St. Louis Cardinals	University of Georgia
2005	Dan Otero	San Francisco Giants	Duke University
2006	Jeff Beliveau	Chicago Cubs	College of Charleston
2006	Chris Dominguez	San Francisco Giants	University of Louisville
2007	Adam Wilk	Detroit Tigers	Long Beach State University
2007	Mike Seander	N/A	Duke University
2009	Greg Garcia	St. Louis Cardinals	University of Hawaiʻi
2010	Mark Appel	Philadelphia Phillies	Stanford University
2010	Chris Taylor	Seattle Mariners	University of Virginia
2010	Pat Light	Boston Red Sox	Monmouth University
2011–12	Daniel Wright	Cincinnati Reds	Arkansas State University
2013	Brett Graves	Miami Marlins	University of Missouri
2013	Joel McKeithan	Cincinnati Reds	Vanderbilt University
2014	Tommy Edman	St. Louis Cardinals	Stanford University
2014	Will Smith	Los Angeles Dodgers	University of Louisville
2015	James Karinchak	Cleveland Guardians	Bryant University
2016	Kris Bubic	Kansas City Royals	Stanford University
2016	Jake Cousins	Milwaukee Brewers	University of Pennsylvania
2017	JJ Bleday	Oakland Athletics	Vanderbilt University
2019	Justyn-Henry Malloy	Detroit Tigers	Georgia Tech

== Notable games ==
- July 29, 2002: Rafael Lara plays all nine positions in a nine-inning game against the Mill City All-Americans. On the pitcher's mound for the seventh inning, Lara got credit for the Gulls 5–4 win.
- July 1, 2005: Four Gulls pitchers throw a no-hitter. After a first-batter walk, the next 27 Danbury Westerner batters are retired in order.
- August 8, 2005: Gulls' second baseman Jeff Miller turns an unassisted triple play in a NECBL championship series game.
- July 21, 2006: Three Gulls pitchers throw a no-hitter against the North Adams SteepleCats.
- July 4, 2008: Gulls pitcher Chase Reid strikes out an NECBL-record 19 Torrington Twisters.
- July 28, 2025: Gulls right fielder Michael Gupton, in a seven-inning game against the Danbury Westerners, hits three home runs with four runs batted in.
