= Riverpoint Royals =

Collegiate summer league baseball team from Rhode Island

- Logo

Information
- Location: West Warwick, RI (1996–2004)
- Ballpark: McCarthy Field
- Founded: 1996
- Disbanded: 2004
- League championships: 0
- Former name: Riverpoint Royals (2001–04); Rhode Island Reds (1996–99)

The Riverpoint Royals was a team in the New England Collegiate Baseball League from 1996 to 2004. The team was known as the Rhode Island Reds from 1996 to 1999 before going on hiatus for the 2000 season and returning the following year.

== Postseason appearances ==
Year	Division Semi-Finals		Division Finals*		NECBL Championship Series
1996			Danbury Westerners	L (0–2)	
1997			Middletown Giants	L (0–2)	
1998			Torrington Twisters	L (0–2)	
1999			Middletown Giants	L (1–2)	
2004	Manchester Silkworms	W (2–1)	Newport Gulls	L (1–2)	

- *The NECBL did not separate into divisions until 2001.
