= Ocean State Waves =

Logo
Cap insignia

Information
- League: NECBL (Southern Division)
- Location: South Kingstown, Rhode Island
- Ballpark: Old Mountain Field
- Founded: 2013
- Colors: Blue, Sea Blue
- Ownership: Eric Hirschbein-Bodnar
- President: Joe Mello (President of Baseball Operations)
- General manager: Joe Mello, Ben Bilotti, Noah Rivera
- Manager: Jalen Borders
- Media: Ben Bilotti
- Website: www.oceanstatewavesbaseball.com

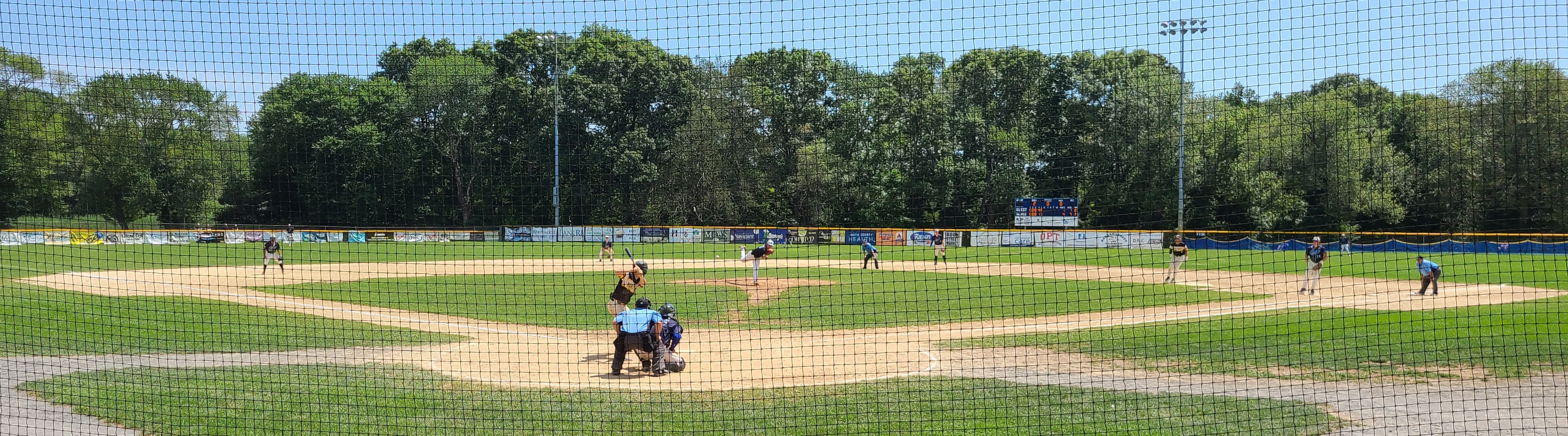
Waves at home against the North Adams SteepleCats during the 2024 season

The Ocean State Waves are a collegiate summer baseball team based in South Kingstown, Rhode Island, United States. The team, a member of the New England Collegiate Baseball League, plays its home games at Old Mountain Field in South Kingstown.

== Postseason appearances ==
| Year | Division Semi-Finals / Wildcard | | Division Finals | | NECBL Championship Series | |
Ocean State Waves
| 2014 | Newport Gulls | L (0–1) | | | | |
| 2015 | Newport Gulls | L (0–1) | | | | |
| 2017 | | | Plymouth Pilgrims | W (2–0) | Valley Blue Sox | L (0–2) |
| 2018 | Mystic Schooners | W (1–0) | Plymouth Pilgrims | W (2–0) | Valley Blue Sox | L (0–2) |
| 2023 | Newport Gulls | L (1–2) | | | | |
