= Valley Blue Sox =

College baseball team

Information
- League: NECBL (South Division)
- Location: Holyoke, MA (2008–present); Concord, NH (2001–2007)
- Ballpark: Mackenzie Stadium (2008–present)
- Founded: 2001
- Nickname: Blue Sox
- League championships: 2 (2017, 2018)
- Former name: Holyoke Blue Sox (2008–2013); Concord Quarry Dogs (2001–2007)
- Former leagues: NECBL; Northern Division (2002, 2004–2008); National Division (2001)
- Former ballpark: Warren H. Doane Diamond (2001–2007)
- Colors: Dark blue, Red
- Mascot: Paws
- Ownership: Matt Drury, President
- General manager: Brandon Seymour
- Manager: Endy Morales
- Website: valleybluesox.com

The Valley Blue Sox are a collegiate summer baseball team based in Holyoke, Massachusetts. The team, a member of the New England Collegiate Baseball League, plays its home games at Mackenzie Stadium. The Blue Sox were founded in 2001 as the Concord Quarry Dogs but moved following the 2007 season to Holyoke to fill the void left by the departure of the Holyoke Giants to Lynn, Massachusetts. In 2017, the team won its first NECBL championship against the Ocean State Waves.

== Team history ==
=== Concord Quarry Dogs ===
Logo of the Concord Quarry Dogs (2001–2007)

The Concord Quarry Dogs were founded in 2001, as the second NECBL team in the state of New Hampshire. The team led the league in attendance their inaugural year. Despite making the postseason in both 2002 and 2003, the fan base slowly began to dwindle. Attendance slipped dramatically in 2004 with the arrival of the New Hampshire Fisher Cats in nearby Manchester, New Hampshire. In 2006, average attendance was only 503 per game. Following the 2007 season, the team was purchased by the brother-sister team of Barry Wadsworth and Karen Rella who had hoped to help keep the team in Concord. But shortly thereafter, citing increased rent costs and low attendance, they began their search for a new home.

=== Move to Holyoke ===
Blue Sox Logo (2008–2013)

With the departure of the Holyoke Giants after the 2007 season, the new ownership group decided to move their team to Holyoke, Massachusetts. Their first year in Holyoke, the Blue Sox finished just under a .500 record and 8 games behind the division winning and eventual NECBL champions Sanford Mainers.

In 2009, the Blue Sox enjoyed far greater success than their inaugural season in Holyoke, finishing with a 20–21 record, earning the fourth and final West Division playoff spot after a one-game playoff with the Danbury Westerners. The Blue Sox then upset the #1 seeded Keene Swamp Bats in the Division Semifinal round, becoming the first ever #4 seed to defeat a #1 seed in the playoffs. However, the Blue Sox were then defeated by the Vermont Mountaineers in the Division Finals. The 2009 season was highlighted by Holyoke's hosting the 2009 NECBL All-Star Game at Mackenzie Stadium. The game saw a record-breaking attendance figure for the event of 4,906.

In 2011, the team finished with a 28–14 record, sharing the West Division regular-season title with the Keene. The team's attendance figures made a dramatic jump, rising from 39th in 2010 to 3rd in collegiate summer baseball. An average of 2,510 spectators attended each game.

=== New ownership and name change ===
Blue Sox logo (2014–present)

In 2013, former Wisconsin Woodchucks owner Clark Eckhoff purchased the team and assumed the role of team president. The 2013 squad advanced to the postseason by winning a play-in game with the Saratoga Brigade before falling 2–1 in the West Division Semifinals to the eventual champions, the Keene Swamp Bats.

In May 2014, the organization announced it would be changing the team's name to the Valley Blue Sox.

=== Quick turnaround and first championship ===
In September 2013, Eckhoff hired General Manager Hunter Golden. Despite winning only 13 games in 2014, the team made a 5-win improvement under Golden in the 2015 season with the help and leadership of newly appointed Manager John Raiola. The team also saw its attendance grow to second in the NECBL in their tenure and 29th nationally among all summer collegiate teams according to Ballpark Digest.

In 2016, the team displaced the Newport Gulls as the top-drawing team in the league, and ranked 11th nationally among all Summer Collegiate Baseball teams in attendance. The success off the field was the same as the success on the field, as the team continued its upward trajectory under the Golden/Raiola tandem, as they finished second in the division with 24 wins on the season. After a dramatic walk-off victory in the division semi-finals, the team jumped out to a 1–0 series lead in the Northern Division Finals against the Sanford Mainers. In one of the more dramatic playoff games in NECBL history, the Blue Sox led the deciding game-3 2-1 heading into the 8th inning. A Sam Stauble triple and a Shane Hughes walk off 3-run HR ended the Sox run, but provided the team with a foundation to build to 2017.

In 2017, the Sox repeated their success of 2016 by qualifying for the NECBL playoffs a second consecutive year, replicating the success of only three other franchises in the league. The team continued to rack up strong attendance numbers, drawing 2,800 fans+ in five consecutive games headed down the stretch run. The team would go on to win 12 of its last 13 games and not lose a single playoff game - capturing the team's first NECBL Championship in franchise history - sweeping through the playoffs and defeating the Ocean State Waves in the championship series.

In the 2018 season, the Blue Sox once again captured the league championship, winning back to back years, as they once again defeated the Ocean State Waves to capture the title; resulting in the Blue Sox being ranked the #1 Summer College Team in the United States.

In 2018, John Raiola was promoted to the Director of Baseball Operations and Chris Weyant as the General Manager. The team maintained its high level of success, finishing second in the Northern division before falling to the Keene Swamp Bats in the Division Finals, marking the fourth straight season the franchise had made it to the Final Four of the league.

While the 2020 season was cancelled due to the COVID-19 pandemic, 2021 brought a new dawn, as Raiola stepped down as manager in favor of former Blue Sox Outfielder and later hitting coach Hezekiah Randolph. Kate Avard once an intern - was named the team's general manager; among the first female general managers in league history. The Blue Sox found themselves swept up in divisional realignment, being moved to the south division where they finished in third place with a 23–19 mark, good enough for third place. The Blue Sox would fall to the eventual 2021 champion Danbury Westerners in the playoffs.

== Postseason appearances ==
Year	Division Semi-Finals		Division Finals		NECBL Championship Series	
Concord Quarry Dogs
2002	Mill City All-Americans	L (1–2)				
2003	Keene Swamp Bats	L (0–2)				
Holyoke Blue Sox
2009	Keene Swamp Bats	W (2–1)	Vermont Mountaineers	L (0–2)		
2011	Vermont Mountaineers	W (2–0)	Keene Swamp Bats	L (1–2)		
2013	Keene Swamp Bats	L (1–2)				
Valley Blue Sox
2016	North Adams SteepleCats	W (2–1)	Sanford Mainers	L (1–2)		
2017	Keene Swamp Bats	W (1–0)	Upper Valley Nighthawks	W (2–0)	Ocean State Waves	W (2–0)
2018	Bye	NA	Sanford Mainers	W (2–0)	Ocean State Waves	W (2–0)

== Accolades ==
=== Records ===
Below is a list of New England Collegiate Baseball League records set by players of the Concord Quarry Dogs and Holyoke/Valley Blue Sox, as of the end of the 2017 season.

Note: An asterisk (*) denotes the record being held by a member of the Concord Quarry Dogs.

==== Individual ====
- Earned run average* - 0.00 by Tyler Smith, 2017
- Games Played* - 24 by Matt Elfeldt, 2001

==== Team ====
- Hit by pitch* - 55, 2004

=== Awards ===
Below is a list of awards won by members of the Concord Quarry Dogs and Holyoke/Valley Blue Sox.

==== End-of-season awards ====
- 2001 Defensive Player of the Year* - Matt Tupman
- 2001 Top Pitcher* - John Velosky
- 2001 Top Relief Pitcher* - Matt Elfeldt
- 2002 Top Pro Prospect* - Grant Reynolds
- 2002 Top Pitcher* - Grant Reynolds
- 2003 Sportsmanship Award* - Angus Fredenburg and Bobby Tewksbury
- 2009 Rick Ligi Most Valuable Player Award - Jim Wood
- 2011 Ben Mount Pitcher of the year - Jim Wood
- 2011 Ronnie Freeman Sportsmanship Award - Jim Wood
- 2011 Trey Mancini Rookie of the Year - Jim Wood
- 2013 Michael Burke Pitcher of the year - Jim Wood
- 2015 Manny De Jesus Jr Defensive Player of the Year - Jim Wood
- 2016 Kyle Mottice 10th Man Award - Jim Wood

==== All-NECBL Team ====
- 2001* - All-League Team: P All-Division Team: 3B Brock Koman, C Matt Tupman, P Matt Elfeldt
- 2002* - First Team: SS P Grant Reynolds; Second Team: P Chris Lambert
- 2003* - First Team: 2B Second Team: SS Bobby Tewksbury, DH Chris Looze
- 2004* - Second Team: SS DH Devin Thomas
- 2005* - First Team: 2B Second Team: 1B Jerod Edmondson, OF Will Bashelor
- 2009 - First Team: OF Second Team: 3B Jake Rosenbeck
- 2011 - First Team: C Second Team: C Ronnie Freeman
- 2011 - First Team: C First Team: C Ronnie Freeman
- 2011 - First Team: P First Team: P Ben Mount
- 2011 - Second Team: C Second Team: C Tommy Murphy
- 2011 - Second Team: 1B Second Team: 1B Trey Mancini
- 2011 - SecondTeam: 2B Second Team: 2B Paul McKonkey
- 2012 - First Team: DH First Team: DH Paul McKonkey
- 2013 - First Team: 3B First Team: 3B Brenden Hendricks
- 2013 - First Team: P First Team: P Mike Burke
- 2013 - Second Team: P Second Team: P Jordan Hillyer
- 2016 - Second Team: DH Second Team: DH Hezekiah Randolph
- 2017 - First Team: CL First Team: CL Tyler Smith

== Professional alumni ==
Below is a list of Concord Quarry Dogs (2001–2007), Holyoke Blue Sox (2008–2012) and Valley Blue Sox (2014–2014) alumni who have gone on to play professional baseball at the AA level or higher. The alumni are sorted by peak level of baseball in which they have participated.

=== MLB ===
Player	Year w/ CON/HOL	Current/Most recent team	Active
Matt Tupman	2001	Lancaster Barnstormers (Indy) - 2011	No
Chris Lambert	2002	Norfolk Tides (AAA) - 2009	No
Stephen Lombardozzi, Jr.	2008	Miami Marlins (MLB) - 2017	No
Trey Mancini	2011	Baltimore Orioles (MLB) - 2026	Yes
Tom Murphy	2011	San Francisco Giants (MLB) - 2024	No
Jake Cronenworth	2013	San Diego Padres (MLB) - 2026	Yes
Juan Perez	2013	Detroit Tigers (MLB) - 2016	No
C. J. Stubbs	2016	Toronto Blue Jays (MLB) - 2026	Yes

=== AAA ===
Player	Year w/ CON/HOL	Current/Most recent team	Active
Ryan Roberson	2002	Toledo Mud Hens (AAA)	No

=== AA ===
Player	Year w/ CON/HOL	Current/Most recent team	Active
Derek Miller	2001	Huntsville Stars (AA)	No
Cory Haggerty	2002	Birmingham Barons (AA)	No
Emary Frederick	2004–2005	Binghamton Mets (AA)	No
Michael Moras	2005	Bridgeport Bluefish (Indy)	Yes
John Mariotti	2006	Quebec Capitales (Indy)	Yes
Joe Testa	2007	Potomac Nationals (High-A)	Yes

== See also ==
- Holyoke Millers, minor league team based out of Mackenzie Stadium, 1977–1982
