= North Shore Navigators =

American collegiate summer baseball team

Logo
Cap insignia

Information
- League: NECBL (Northern Division)
- Location: Lynn, Massachusetts; Holyoke, Massachusetts (2004-2007); Middletown, Connecticut (1994-2003)
- Ballpark: Fraser Field
- Founded: 1994
- Nickname: Navs
- League championships: 1997; 1998; 1999; 2010
- Division championships: 2007
- Former name: Holyoke Giants (2004-2007); Middletown Giants (1994-2003)
- Former league(s): FCBL (2012-2020); NECBL (1994-2011)
- Former ballpark(s): Mackenzie Stadium (2004-2007); Palmer Field (1994-2003)
- Colors: Navy, Burnt Orange
- Mascot: Chomps the 'Gator
- Ownership: Old School Sports Group
- Management: Jeff January (EVP); Don January (EVP); Maggie Barden (VP/Operations)
- General manager: Derek January
- Manager: Jack Hawke
- Website: www.nsnavs.com

The North Shore Navigators are a wooden-bat, collegiate summer baseball team based in Lynn, Massachusetts, playing in the New England Collegiate Baseball League (NECBL). The team plays home games at Fraser Field in Lynn. The team is owned by Old School Sports Group, LLC.

The Navigators are the successor to the Giants of the New England Collegiate Baseball League, a charter team in Middletown, Connecticut that moved to Holyoke, Massachusetts. The franchise relocated to Lynn for the 2008 season. They switched to the Futures Collegiate Baseball League (FCBL) for the 2012 season and returned to the NECBL for the 2021 season.

== Team history ==
=== NECBL charter franchise ===
The Navigators began as the Middletown Giants, one of five charter franchises of the NECBL, playing at Palmer Field in Middletown, Connecticut. They finished the NECBL's inaugural 1994 regular season with the second-best record in the league, though the team did not qualify for the championship series. After a last-place showing in 1995, the Giants qualified for postseason play in 1996, but lost to the now-defunct Central Mass. Collegians.

In 1997, the Giants tied for third place with a 19–21 record, qualifying the team for postseason play for the second straight year. After sweeping the Rhode Island Reds in a best-of-three series, the Giants went on to defeat the Torrington Twisters for the Championship. Middletown's game-one victory (8–7 in 13 innings) was one of the longest playoff games in NECBL history. After being shut-out 4–0 at home, the Giants defeated Torrington 8–5 in a decisive Game 3.

1998 again saw the Giants finish in third place. After sweeping the Danbury Westerners in the postseason, Middletown defeated Torrington three games to one in a best-of-five rematch of the 1997 series, marking the franchise's second straight league championship.

The Middletown Giants.

In 1999, the Giants finished at 27–15, a half a game behind the first place Keene Swampbats. They defeated the Rhode Island Reds two games to one, and defeated the Danbury Westerners three games to one for their third consecutive championship, the first and only time an NECBL team has won the championship three consecutive seasons.

=== Post-championship years ===
In 2000, the Giants finished the regular season in fourth place at 22-30 and lost the semi-finals to Keene. In 2001, the Giants again finished in fourth place at 16–24 in the new American Division as the NECBL expanded to 10 teams. The Giants averaged of only 107 fans per game in 2001.

In 2002, the NECBL moved the Giants to the Southern Division, in a short-lived three division alignment. The Giants were runner-up to the Newport Gulls. The team lost two straight games to Danbury in the first round of the playoffs.

In 2003, the Giants averaged only half as many fans at home games as at away games. In the playoffs, they were swept by the Torrington Twisters in the first round. Both these games were at Torrington, so the final Giants game at Palmer Field took place on July 21, 2003, where the Giants lost, 4–2, to the Newport Gulls, in front of 326 fans.

Middletown Giants players who went on to Major League Baseball include Rajai Davis, Chad Paronto, Mike Smith, Doug Clark, and Earl Snyder.

=== The Move to Holyoke ===
The Giants left Connecticut for Holyoke, MA in 2004, where they played their games at MacKenzie Stadium. The team saw success there in terms of attendance, averaging 548 fans a game, with a season total of 11,514. With a 17–25 record, though, the Giants failed to make the playoffs.

The Holyoke Giants, 2004 - 2007.

In 2005, the team fared better in the standings, at 23–19, and while attendance dropped off somewhat, the team saw its first playoff berth in Holyoke. 1,100 fans came out for Game 1 of the first round against the Vermont Mountaineers, though the Giants fell, 9–0, and went on to lost Game 2 in Vermont. Despite a losing season in 2006, the Giants again saw a playoff berth, though they were once again swept by the Mountaineers in the first round.

2007 saw one of the most successful seasons for the Giants in nearly a decade, as they finished at 26–16, amidst a battle for first place in the NECBL North. The first round of the playoffs had Holyoke paired up with the Lowell All-Americans, and in the longest three-game series in NECBL history, the Giants came out on top. After winning Game 1 in 11 innings on a walk-off walk, the Lowell All-Americans won Game 2 on a walk-off single, in the bottom of the 15th inning. The series returned to Holyoke for Game 3, where, in 10 innings, a walk-off sacrifice fly sent the Giants to the Northern Division Championship Series.

Having finished the regular season in first place, the Giants had home field advantage for Game 1 against the Vermont Mountaineers, though lost 7–3. Game 2 seemed like it would be yet another extra inning contest for the Giants, but a walk-off home run in the bottom of the 9th by Vermont ended Holyoke's season.

=== North Shore Navigators ===
By December 2007, word had spread that the Giants would move to Lynn and play at Fraser Field under the name North Shore Navigators. Owner Phil Rosenfield announced the move in The Republican. Fraser Field had been home to the North Shore Spirit of the Canadian-American Association of Professional Baseball, which ceased operation at the end of 2007 after five years. Rosenfield expressed regrets for leaving Holyoke and praised his staff. However, the Concord Quarry Dogs immediately took the Giants' place in Holyoke as the Holyoke Blue Sox (now known as the Valley Blue Sox).

The move to Lynn was the first move by the NECBL into Greater Boston area, having previously come no closer than Lowell. It also marked the abandonment of the original name of the last of the five charter NECBL teams.

The Navigators finished their first season in Lynn in second place in the NECBL Northern Division, at 26–16, two games behind eventual 2008 champion Sanford Mainers. The Navigators' 2.52 team ERA and .973 team fielding percentage were the best in the league. In the postseason, the Navigators were upset by the Keene Swampbats, who swept North Shore 11–7 in Lynn, then 1–0 in Keene. Home games were televised in several communities by LYNNCAM TV.

In 2009, the Navigators finished third in the East Division at 20–21. In a first-round matchup with the second-seeded Sanford Mainers, the Navigators split the first two games. In the decisive third game, the Navigators lost, 5–3.

In 2010, the Navigators finished second in the East Division at 25–17. They beat the Sanford Mainers, two games to one, to advance the East Finals against defending champion Newport Gulls. They dropped the first game in Newport, but they came back with a home victory to force a deciding third game, which North Shore pulled out on the road. The Navigators moved on to face the Danbury Westerners in the Championship Series. Both teams won a game at their home fields to set up a winner-take-all third game at Fraser Field in Lynn. The Navigators won a back-and-forth contest 5–4 to secure the team's 4th NECBL crown, the first as the Navigators.

=== League switches ===
Before the 2012 season, Tim Haley sold the Navigators to Pat Salvi's Salvi Sports New England, LLC, and the Navigators switched from the NECBL to the Futures Collegiate Baseball League, as part of the FCBL's expansion from 4 to 9 teams.

The team was sold to the January family of Swampscott before the 2020 season, which was mostly played without fans or income because of the city and state's response to the COVID-19 pandemic. The Navigators returned to the NECBL for the 2021 season.

== Postseason appearances ==
=== NECBL ===
Year	Division Semi-Finals*		Division Finals*		NECBL Championship Series	
Middletown Giants
1996			Central Mass Collegians	L (1–2)		
1997			Rhode Island Reds	W (2–0)	Torrington Twisters	W (2–1)
1998			Danbury Westerners	W (2–0)	Torrington Twisters	W (3–1)
1999			Rhode Island Reds	W (2–1)	Danbury Westerners	W (3–1)
2000			Keene Swamp Bats	L (1–2)		
2002	Danbury Westerners	L (0–2)				
2003	Torrington Twisters	L (0–2)				
Holyoke Giants
2005	Vermont Mountaineers	L (0–2)				
2006	Vermont Mountaineers	L (0–2)				
2007	Lowell All-Americans	W (2–1)	Vermont Mountaineers	L (0–2)		
North Shore Navigators
2008	Keene Swamp Bats	L (0–2)				
2009	Sanford Mainers	L (1–2)				
2010	Sanford Mainers	W (2–1)	Newport Gulls	W (2–1)	Danbury Westerners	W (2–1)
2021**	Keene Swamp Bats	W (2–1)	Upper Valley Nighthawks	W (2–0)	Danbury Westerners	L (0–2)

* From 1995 - 2000, the top four NECBL teams played each other in a league semi-final.
** In 2021, every team entered the playoffs; those in 3rd through 7th place played a one-game "play-in", which North Shore won at Montpelier. A rain-shortened Game 2 against a decimated Upper Valley team was eventually ruled final and the Navigators were declared Division Champions.

=== FCBL ===
Year	Play-In Round*		Semi-Final Round		FCBL Championship	
North Shore Navigators
2012			Torrington Titans	W (2–1)	Nashua Silver Knights	L (0–2)
2013	Brockton Rox	L (0–1)				
2015	Nashua Silver Knights	L (0–1)				
2016	Brockton Rox	W (1–0)	Worcester Bravehearts	L (0–2)		
2019	Nashua Silver Knights	W (1–0)	Bristol Blues	L (1–2)		

* Added in the 2013 season.
