= Danbury Westerners =

Collegiate Baseball team based in Danbury, Connecticut

Logo
Cap insignia

Information
- League: NECBL (South Division)
- Location: Danbury, CT (1995-present)
- Ballpark: Rogers Park (1995-present)
- Founded: 1995
- Regular-Season Division championships: 1 (2002)
- League championships: 1 (2021)
- Former name: Danbury Westerners (1995-present)
- Former leagues: NECBL; Southern Division (2004-2008, 2014-2021, 2025-present); Western Division (2002, 2009-2013, 2022-2024); National Division (2001)
- Colors: Black, Silver, Red
- Ownership: Jon Pitser (President)
- Management: Chris Nathanson (GM)
- Manager: Conor Farrell
- Media: WLAD 800 AM, Bill Guider,
- Website: danburywesterners.com

The Danbury Westerners are a collegiate summer baseball team based in Danbury, Connecticut. The team, a member of the New England Collegiate Baseball League, plays their home games at Rogers Park. The team played its inaugural season in 1995. The Danbury Westerners are the oldest active team in the NECBL. The Westerners compete in the Southern Division in the NECBL.

On August 12, 2021, the Westerners finally won their first NECBL championship as they defeated the North Shore Navigators in two games.

== Postseason appearances ==
Year	Wild Card Game*		Quarter Finals		Semi Finals		NECBL Championship Series	
Danbury Westerners
1995					Central Mass Collegians	L (0-2)		
1996					Rhode Island Reds	W (2-0)	Central Mass Collegians	L (1-2)
1997					Torrington Twisters	L (0-2)		
1998					Middletown Giants	L (0-2)		
1999					Keene Swamp Bats	W (2-1)	Middletown Giants	L (1-3)
2002			Middletown Giants	W (2-0)	Newport Gulls	L (0-2)		
2003			Newport Gulls	L (1-2)				
2005			Newport Gulls	L (0-2)				
2010			Bristol Collegiate	W (2-1)	North Adams SteepleCats	W (2-1)	North Shore Navigators	L (1-2)
2011			Keene Swamp Bats	L (1-2)				
2012			North Adams SteepleCats	W (2-1)	Keene Swamp Bats	W (2-1)	Newport Gulls	L (0-2)
2016			Newport Gulls	L (1-2)				
2021	Newport Gulls	W	Valley Blue Sox	W (2-0)	Martha's Vineyard Sharks	W (2-1)	North Shore Navigators	W (2-0)
2023			Vermont Mountaineers	W (2-0)	Newport Gulls	L (0-2)		
2026			Upper Valley Nighthawks	W (2-0)	Mystic Schooners	W (2-1)	Sanford Mainers	L (1-2)

== Alumni in MLB ==
The Danbury Westerners have had 30 former players make it into the Big Leagues since playing with them. The first being Earl Snyder with Cleveland in 2002. Mark Malaska's #15 is the only number retired by Danbury as he was the first to win a championship, which he did in 2004 with Boston.

Danbury Westerners in MLB.
Year	Name	MLB Team	College	MLB Debut
1996	Earl Snyder	Cleveland Indians	University of Hartford	2002
1996	Matt White	Boston Red Sox	Clemson University	2003
1996	Pete Zoccolillo	Milwaukee Brewers	Rutgers University	2003
1997	Steve Stemle	Kansas City Royals	Western Kentucky University	2005
1998-99	Mark Malaska	Tampa Bay Devil Rays	University of Akron	2003
2000	Brian Slocum	Cleveland Indians	Villanova University	2006
2000	Matt DeSalvo	New York Yankees	Marietta College	2007
2001	Jason Bergmann	Washington Nationals	Rutgers University	2005
2001	Joe Thatcher	San Diego Padres	Indiana State University	2007
2002	Jeff Baisley	Oakland Athletics	University of South Florida	2008
2002	Dusty Hughes	Kansas City Royals	Delta State University	2008
2002	Jack Egbert	Chicago White Sox	Rutgers University	2009
2002	Jeff Frazier	Detroit Tigers	Rutgers University	2010
2003	Jarrett Hoffpauir	St. Louis Cardinals	University of Southern Mississippi	2009
2003	Joe Martinez	San Francisco Giants	Boston College	2009
2003	Brian Bogusevic	Houston Astros	Tulane University	2010
2004	Matt Joyce	Detroit Tigers	Florida Southern College	2008
2004	Adam Ottavino	St. Louis Cardinals	Northeastern University	**2010**
2008	Mike Olt	Texas Rangers	University of Connecticut	2012
2009	Billy Burns	Oakland Athletics	Mercer University	2014
2010	Mike Hauschild	Texas Rangers	University of Dayton	2017
**2011**	Mike Ford	New York Yankees	Princeton University	**2019**
2014	Vimael Machín	Oakland Athletics	Virginia Commonwealth University	2020
2014	Josh Palacios	Toronto Blue Jays	Auburn University	2021
**2016**	**Josiah Gray**	**Los Angeles Dodgers**	**Le Moyne College**	**2021**
2016	David Villar	San Francisco Giants	University of South Florida	2022
2016	Coco Montes	Colorado Rockies	University of South Florida	2023
2017	Brendan White	Detroit Tigers	Siena College	2023
2019	**Emmet Sheehan**	**Los Angeles Dodgers**	**Boston College**	2023
2017	Cam Devanney	Pittsburgh Pirates	Elon University	2025

Bold denotes player is still active in MLB.

Westerners logo from 1995-2019

== See also ==
- New England Collegiate Baseball League
