= Manchester Silkworms =

Team logo
Cap insignia

Information
- Location: Manchester, Connecticut (2000–09)
- Ballpark: Northwest Park (2000–09)
- Founded: 2000
- Disbanded: 2009
- League championships: 0
- Former name(s): Manchester Silkworms (2000–09)

The Manchester Silkworms were a collegiate summer baseball team located in Manchester, Connecticut playing in the New England Collegiate Baseball League, a collegiate summer baseball league operating in the northeastern United States region of New England. The team, an expansion franchise formed in 1999 which began play for the 2000 season, was based out of Northwest Park. In October, 2009 a new ownership group announced they would be moving the team to Laconia, New Hampshire, becoming the Laconia Muskrats (now called the Winnipesaukee Muskrats).

== History ==
=== Silkworm name ===
In 1838, the Cheney Family started what became the world's largest silk mill, and by the 1920s developed a utopian industrial community. The intact mill buildings, owner houses and worker houses are now a National Historic Landmark District. The mill buildings have undergone restoration and conversion to housing in the recent past.

Hence, the name Silkworms.

=== Move to Laconia ===
On Sunday, October 18, 2009, Silkworms founder, owner, and general manager Ed Slegeski announced that he had sold the team to a partnership led by Noah Crane, which moved the team to Laconia, New Hampshire for the 2010 NECBL season.

=== Notable former players ===
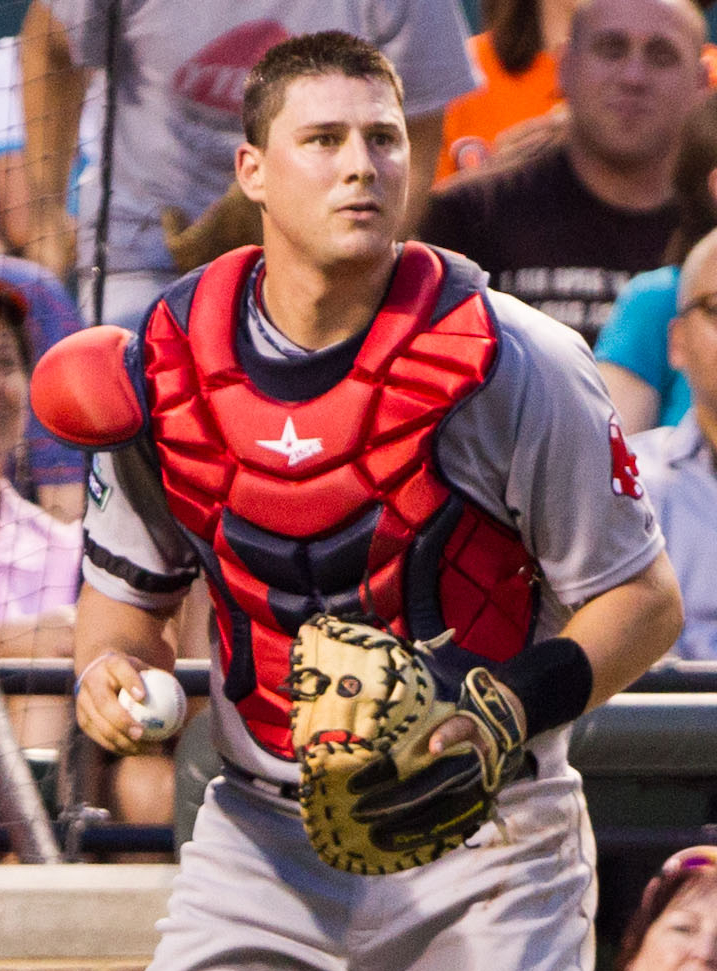
Ryan Lavarnway

- Jonah Bayliss, former Kansas City Royals and Pittsburgh Pirates pitcher
- Nick Christiani, Cincinnati Reds pitcher
- Chris Denorfia, San Diego Padres outfielder
- Graham Godfrey, Pittsburgh Pirates pitcher
- Reid Gorecki, former Atlanta Braves outfielder
- Zach Jackson, Washington National pitcher
- Ryan Lavarnway, Baltimore Orioles catcher
- Andy Parrino, Oakland Athletics shortstop

== Postseason appearances ==
Year	Division Semi-Finals		Division Finals	NECBL Championship Series
2004	Riverpoint Royals	L (1-2)		
2005	North Adams SteepleCats	L (1-2)		
2006	Newport Gulls	L (1-2)		
2007	Torrington Twisters	L (0-2)		
2008	Newport Gulls	L (0-2)		

== See also ==
- New England Collegiate Baseball League
- Manchester, Connecticut
