= Keene Swamp Bats =

- Logo

Information
- League: NECBL (North Division)
- Location: Keene, NH (1997–present)
- Ballpark: Alumni Field (1997–present)
- Founded: 1997
- Post-season division championships: 6 (2000, 2001, 2002, 2003, 2011, 2013)
- Regular-season division championships: 6 (2002, 2004, 2005, 2009, 2011, 2012)
- League championships: 6 (2000, 2003, 2011, 2013, 2019, 2025)
- Former name: Keene Swamp Bats (1997–present)
- Former leagues: NECBL; Northern Division (2002, 2004–2008); National Division (2001)
- Colors: Purple, black
- Ownership: Kevin Watterson
- Management: Vicki Bacon (GM)
- Manager: Shaun McKenna
- Website: swampbats.com

The Keene Swamp Bats are a collegiate summer baseball team based in Keene, New Hampshire. The team, a member of the New England Collegiate Baseball League, plays their home games at Alumni Field. In the NECBL, they are consistently one of the top teams and have reached the league playoffs in 18 of the past 21 seasons[Edit] The team has won the League Championship six times, and also has one of the largest fan bases in the league. Since 2002, they have led the NECBL in attendance three times and have finished outside the top two teams in attendance only once. This attendance is facilitated by Alumni Field's having the largest official capacity of any NECBL ballpark.

== Team history ==
Year	Regular season	Postseason
1998	18-24	DNQ
1999	27-14	1-2
2000	27-15	4-2*
2001	24-16	3-3
2002	31-11	4-4
2003	27-14	6-0*
2004	26-16	3-2
2005	30-13	3-2
2006	22-20	0-2
2007	22-20	0-2
2008	24-17	2-2
2009	27-13	1-2
2010	20-22	1-2
2011	28-14	6-2*
2012	29-13	2-2
2013	27-17	6-3*
2014	21-21	1-2
2015	13-29	DNQ
2016	20-26	DNQ
2017	20-25	0-1
2018	24-21	0-1
2019	30-19	4-1*
2020	Season cancelled because of the COVID-19 pandemic	
2021	27-17	1-2
2022	17-27	DNQ
2023	26-18	DNQ
2024	17-27	DNQ
2025	32-12	6-0*
Total	624-455	54-58
Overall	678-513	

KEY: * - won Championship; DNQ - did not qualify

== Postseason appearances ==
Year	Division semi-finals		Division finals*		NECBL Championship Series	
Keene Swamp Bats
1999			Danbury Westerners	L (1–2)		
2000			Middletown Giants	W (2–1)	Rhode Island Gulls	W (2–1)
2001			Torrington Twisters	W (2–1)	Newport Gulls	L (1–2)
2002	Torrington Twisters	W (2–1)	Lowell All-Americans	W (2–1)	Newport Gulls	L (0–2)
2003	Concord Quarry Dogs	W (2–0)	Sanford Mainers	W (2–0)	Torrington Twisters	W (2–0)
2004	Vermont Mountaineers	W (2–0)	Sanford Mainers	L (1–2)		
2005	Sanford Mainers	W (2–0)	Vermont Mountaineers	L (1–2)		
2006	Sanford Mainers	L (0–2)				
2007	Vermont Mountaineers	L (0–2)				
2008	North Shore Navigators	W (2–0)	Sanford Mainers	L (0–2)		
2009	Holyoke Blue Sox	L (1–2)				
2010	North Adams SteepleCats	L (1–2)				
2011	Danbury Westerners	W (2–1)	Holyoke Blue Sox	W (2–1)	Laconia Muskrats	W (2–0)
2012	Vermont Mountaineers	W (2–0)	Danbury Westerners	L (0–2)		
2013	Holyoke Blue Sox	W (2–1)	Vermont Mountaineers	W (2-1)	Newport Gulls	W (2-1)
2014	Sanford Mainers	L (1-2)				
2017	Valley Blue Sox	L (0-5)				
2018	Sanford Mainers	L (0-2)				
2019			Valley Blue Sox	W (2-1)	Martha's Vineyard Sharks	W (2-0)
2021	North Shore Navigators	L (1-2)				
2025	Upper Valley Nighthawks	W (2-0)	Sanford Mainers	W (2-0)	Martha's Vineyard Sharks	W (2-0)

- *The NECBL did not separate into divisions until 2001.
