= Sanford Mainers =

American collegiate summer baseball team

- Logo

Information
- League: NECBL (North Division)
- Location: Sanford, ME (2002–present)
- Ballpark: Goodall Park (2002–present)
- Founded: 2002
- Post-Season Division championships: 4 (2004, 2008, 2014, 2016)
- Regular-Season Division championships: 3 (2003, 2008, 2016)
- League championships: 3 (2004, 2008, 2026)
- Colors: Green, Gold
- Mascot: Broose D'Moose and Boomer
- Ownership: Non Profit Organization. Run by the Board of Directors.
- President: Jacob Ouellette
- General manager: Aaron Izaryk
- Manager: Nic Lops
- Media: Justin Ciavolella (Director of Broadcasting and Media)
- Website: sanfordmainers.com

The Sanford Mainers are a collegiate summer baseball team based in Sanford, Maine. The team, a member of the New England Collegiate Baseball League, plays their home games at Goodall Park.

== History ==
In late 2001, New England Collegiate Baseball League approached the Town of Sanford about the potential of having a team. Sanford's former Parks and Recreation Director Marcel Blouin met with various officials, and proposed Goodall Park as the home field for a team.

Start-up funds were provided through local businessmen Allen Mapes, Ron Woodward, and Geoff Titherington, as well as Neil Olson, a businessman from Bethel, Maine who had previously been involved with the Lowell All-Americans organization, a former member of the NECBL. In the second year, local investors Bob Hardison, Bob Gonyou, Joe Vitko, Gary Miller, and Curtis Jacks also joined the management team. After a few years, the Mainers' management group agreed the team should be operated by the shareholders, and shifted ownership to a volunteer group of citizens of Sanford-Springvale and local communities, becoming a non-profit organization.

== Mainers attendance ==
The following is a list of Sanford Mainers attendance figures at Goodall Park dating back to the team's inception in the 2002 season. The team's record average attendance came in the 2005 season, when an average of 699 spectators attended each home game.

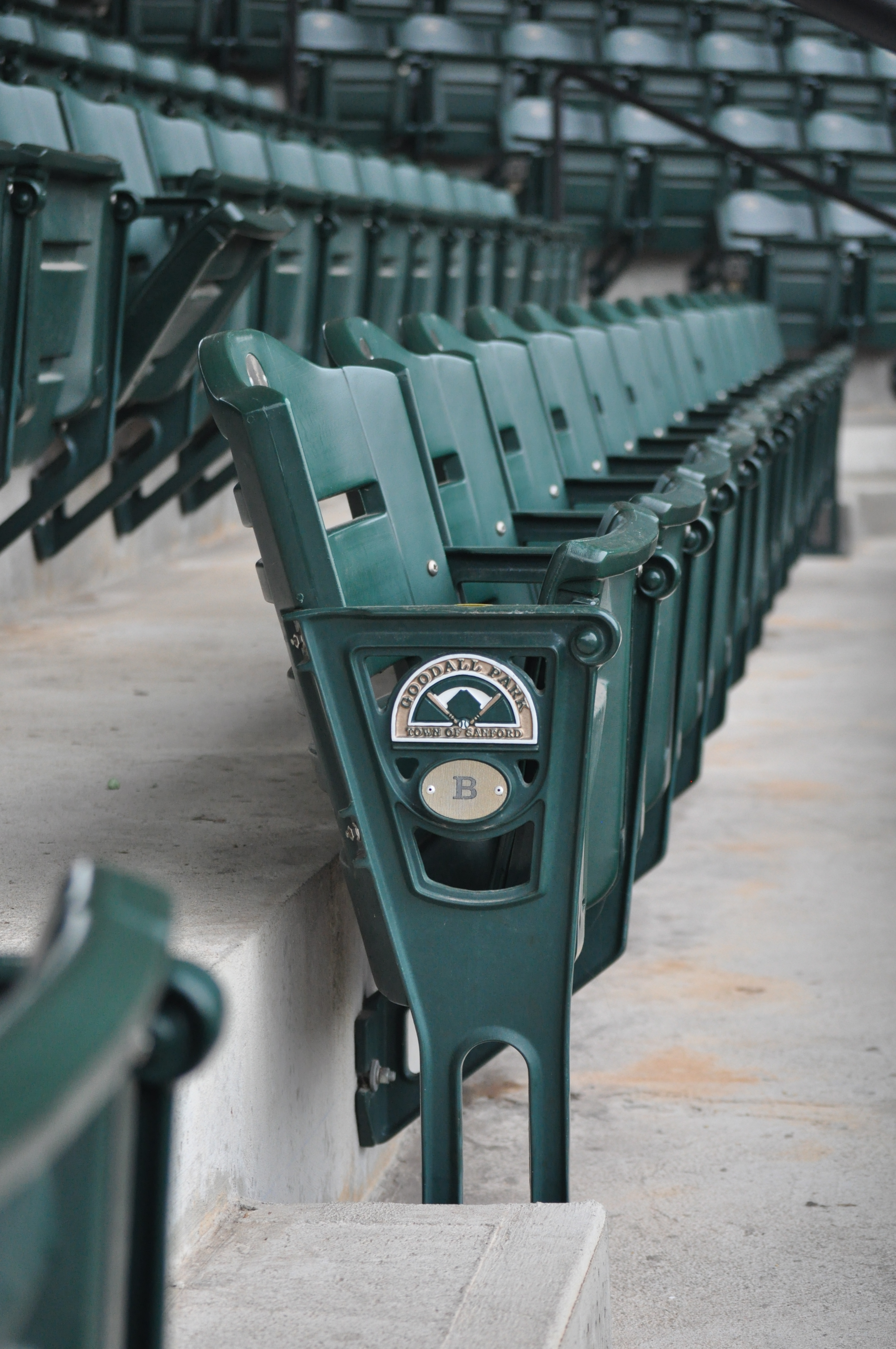
The chair backed seats of the park's grandstand

Season	Game Avg.	Season Total	League Rank
2002	658	13,829	6th
2003	474	9,968	7th
2004	607	12,760	7th
2005	699	14,692	7th
2006	613	12,889	7th
2007	559	11,751	7th
2008	548	11,513	9th
2009	516	9,818	9th
2010	495	10,389	8th
2011	555	11,090	9th
2012	504	10,089	7th
2013	436	9,601	8th
2014	480	10,084	7th
2015	483	10,151	9th
2016	464	9,747	8th
2017	516	11,351	7th
2018	567	10,778	6th
2019	453	9,969	8th
2020	No season.	Cancelled.	COVID-19
2021	477	8,583	9th
2022	476	9,993	9th
2023	402	8,441	9th
2024	549	11,546	8th
2025	576	12,090	7th
2026	521	13,521	8th

== Team history ==
Year	Regular Season	Postseason
2002	15-27	DNQ
2003	28-13	2-2
2004	23-19	6-3*
2005	23-19	0-2
2006	26-16	3-2
2007	19-24	DNQ
2008	28-14	6-1*
2009	23-16	3-3
2010	23-19	1-2
2011	20-21	2-3
2012	10-24	1-2
2013	18-22	0-2
2014	22-17	4-3
2015	22-18	1-2
2016	26-16	4-4
2017	17-26	DNQ
2018	23-18	1-2
2019	14-27	DNQ
2020	No season.	COVID-19
2021	15-24	0-1
2022	22-22	2-2
2023	24-19	2-2
2024	26-18	5-2
2025	22-22	2-3
2026	26-15	6-2*
Overall	515-476 (52.0% winning percentage)	51-45 (53.1%)

KEY: * - WON Championship; DNQ - Did Not Qualify

== Postseason appearances ==
Since 2002, the Sanford Mainers have claimed the league championship three times: 2004, 2008, and 2026. The Mainers have also appeared in the final round in 2014, 2016, and 2024.In the franchise's history, the team has made the postseason all but three times.

Year	Division Semi-Finals		Division Finals		NECBL Championship Series	
Sanford Mainers
2003	North Adams Steeplecats	W (2-0)	Keene Swamp Bats	L (0-2)		
2004	North Adams Steeplecats	W (2-1)	Keene Swamp Bats	W (2-1)	Newport Gulls	W (2-1)
2005	Keene Swamp Bats	L (0-2)				
2006	Keene Swamp Bats	W (2-0)	Vermont Mountaineers	L (1-2)		
2008	Vermont Mountaineers	W (2-1)	Keene Swamp Bats	W (2-0)	Newport Gulls	W (2-0)
2009	North Shore Navigators	W (2-1)	Newport Gulls	L (1-2)		
2010	North Shore Navigators	L (1-2)				
2011	North Shore Navigators	W (2-1)	Laconia Muskrats	L (0-2)		
2012	Newport Gulls	L (1-2)				
2013	Newport Gulls	L (0-2)				
2014	Keene Swamp Bats	W (2-1)	Vermont Mountaineers	W (2-0)	Newport Gulls	L (0-2)
2015	North Adams SteepleCats	L (1-2)				
2016	Upper Valley Nighthawks	W (2-1)	Valley Blue Sox	W (2-1)	Mystic Schooners	L (0-2)
2018	Keene Swamp Bats	W (1-0)	Valley Blue Sox	L (0-2)		
2021	North Adams SteepleCats	L (0-1)				
2022	Newport Gulls	W (1-0)	Vermont Mountaineers	L (1-2)		
2023	Mystic Schooners	W (2-0)	Bristol Blues	L (0-2)		
2024	Keene Swamp Bats	W (2-0)	Vermont Mountaineers	W (2-0)	Newport Gulls	L (1-2)
2025	North Adams SteepleCats	W (2-1)	Keene Swamp Bats	L (0-2)		
2026	Valley Blue Sox	W (2-0)	Bristol Blues	W (2-1)	Danbury Westerners	W (2-1)

== Media ==
The team's games are broadcast on the NECBL Broadcast Network through BlueFrame Technology, as well as locally on 104.3 FM, AM 1220 The Legends WWSF. Until the 2012 season, games were only broadcast on the NECBL Broadcast Network. The radio station announced in March 2012 plans to broadcast away games, as well.

In 2024, the Mainers were selected as one of three NECBL pilot broadcast sites for ESPN+ (alongside with the Bristol Blues and Vermont Mountaineers), with 10 Mainers games airing exclusively on the streaming platform.
