= Worcester Bravehearts =

Logo
Cap insignia

Information
- League: FCBL (2014-present)
- Location: Worcester, Massachusetts (2014-present)
- Ballpark: Fitton Field (2014-present)
- Founded: 2014
- League championships: 2014, 2015, 2018 (Co-champs), 2019
- Colors: Navy, Green
- Ownership: Frank Vaccaro
- President: Matt Vaccaro
- Manager: Joe Galvin
- Website: worcesterbravehearts.com//

The Worcester Bravehearts are a summer collegiate baseball team based in Worcester, Massachusetts, US, that plays in the Futures Collegiate Baseball League (FCBL) starting in 2014. The team's home games are played at Fitton Field in Worcester.

The Bravehearts brought baseball back to Worcester after the Worcester Tornadoes franchise was disbanded in 2012.

== Team history ==
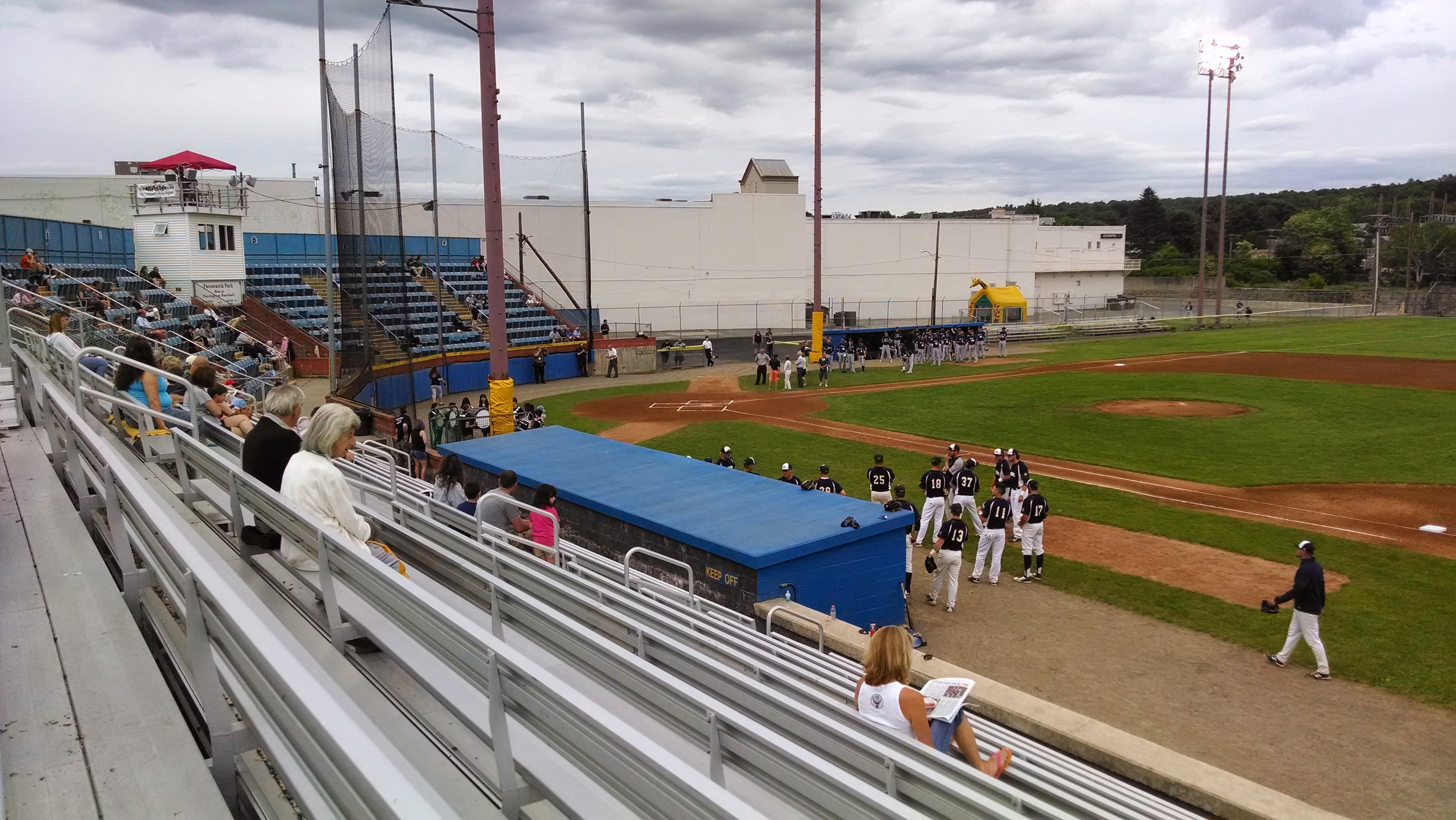
Pregame of the team's inaugural game in 2014. The Bravehearts defeated Torrington, 3–1.

The team was announced as a partnership with the College of the Holy Cross on September 30, 2013. The new team's name and logo were announced on December 2, 2013, selecting the name "Bravehearts". The "hearts" in the name refer to the heart on Worcester's city seal and nickname as the "Heart of the Commonwealth".

=== 2014 season ===
The team began its inaugural season on June 4, 2014, with a 3–1 win in Torrington, Connecticut, against the Torrington Titans.

On August 14, 2014, the Bravehearts defeated the Martha's Vineyard Sharks 1–0 at Hanover Insurance Park at Fitton Field to clinch the FCBL Championship.

=== 2015 season ===
In 2015, the Bravehearts started their title defense poorly, but a concluding 8–2 run in their last ten games got them into the playoffs as the sixth seed. They went on to repeat as league champions, defeating the Bristol Blues with a tenth-inning rally in the third game of the best-of-three championship series.

=== 2016 season ===
Worcester won the West Division with a league-best record of 37–18 during the 2016 regular season, and for the third straight season they advanced to the FCBL Championship Series, where they fell to the Nashua Silver Knights in two games.

Total attendance for Bravehearts games went up 18 percent in 2016. Averaging 2,230 spectators per game, the team ranked ninth nationally among total attendance for summer collegiate teams.

=== 2017 season ===
The Bravehearts won the final game of the 2017 regular season to earn a one-game, winner-moves-on-loser-goes-home game against the Wachusett Dirt Dawgs. The Bravehearts won, 9–2, that sent them to the semifinals against the Brockton Rox. Worcester won the first two of the best-of-three series, capping it off with a wild, 13–7, win on the road. For the fourth straight year – all four of their time in the league – the Bravehearts punched their ticket to the championship series, this time in a rematch against the Nashua Silver Knights. On August 12, Nashua completed the two-game sweep again with a 2–0 victory in Game 2 at Holman Stadium in Nashua.

=== 2018 season ===
The Bravehearts earned a share of the 2018 FCBL League championship, as the title was split between them and the Martha's Vineyard Sharks. The Bravehearts won Game 1, 10–6, on the Vineyard but lost Game 2, 4–2, at home. After rain washed out Game 3 of the FCBL Championship series at Vineyard Ballpark, league commissioner Chris Hall declared the Bravehearts and Martha's Vineyard Sharks co-champions. The best-of-three series already had been delayed a day and many players' flights home already had been booked. Postponing the game to the next day was not an option.

=== 2019 season ===
In June 2019, the team's owner said he believes the Bravehearts can remain in the market after the 2021 relocation of the Triple-A Pawtucket Red Sox.

Worcester finished the 2019 regular season with a 30–26 record. The Bravehearts beat the Pittsfield Suns in a one-game playoff. They then beat the Brockton Rox, 2–1, in the semifinals to make the championship series for the sixth time in six seasons. After beating the Bristol Blues, 2–1, in Game 1, Worcester won Game 2 in Bristol, 12–2, to win its fourth FCBL title in six years.

=== 2020 season ===
In 2020, the team was forced to relocate to Doyle Field in Leominster, MA due to the COVID-19 pandemic and restrictions within the state of Massachusetts. The team finished first in the regular season with a 23–15 record, advancing to the championship series to take on the Nashua Silver Knights. Despite being the home team, all three games were played in Nashua, NH because of COVID-19 restrictions in the State of Massachusetts. The Bravehearts lost the series 2–1, coming within one game of a fifth championship.

=== 2021 season ===
In 2021, the Bravehearts started the season at 25% capacity, once again due to COVID-19 Restrictions. In a surprise announcement, Massachusetts Governor Charlie Baker announced that stadiums and businesses could open to 100% capacity a week into the team's season. Despite the state's opening, the Worcester Bravehearts experienced their worst-attended year in franchise history, with an announced average attendance of 1,229 fans.

On the field, the Bravehearts also failed to advance to The Futures League Championship Series for the first time in their eight-year history. The eventual champion Vermont Lake Monsters defeated the Bravehearts 2–0 in a best-of-three series to advance to the Championship Series.

=== 2022 season ===
In an effort to increase attendance in 2022, the Bravehearts launched an off-season interactive campaign known as "Twenty-Twenty-You" allowing fans to have an impact on what they show at their games.

Their first initiative in 2022 was to create a 90-foot fan wall, also referred to as the "Home is Where the 'Hearts Are" Fan Wall. In partnership with the Better Business Bureau the team asked fans to submit selfies throughout the off-season to be featured on the mural, as well as asked small business owners to submit logos of their family-owned businesses to be displayed. The 90-foot banner was unveiled on opening night with over 250 faces and 65 small business logos, all on the wall at no cost.

On June 7, the team caught national attention as the Bravehearts became the first team in organized baseball history to play a game where the fans were able to choose the rules the teams played by during their "You-Choose-The-Rules" games. As part of the "Twenty-Twenty-You" campaign, the Bravehearts allowed fans to submit rules in the off-season that they would like to see the team play by, and chose one rule per inning that was submitted by a fan. Some rules included kickball for an inning, pied in the face if you strike out, and rock-paper-scissors to determine out or safe. The team announced both games as sellouts, with over 6,000 fans combined witnessing the warped baseball rulebook.

For the first time in franchise history, the team failed to qualify for the Futures League playoffs, finishing with a 26–36 record. Despite the lack of on-field success, the team announced a 30% attendance jump from the previous season, along with 5 sellouts and a record-breaking month of online ticket sales in July 2022.

The team celebrated their 10th anniversary season in 2023.

== Roster ==
Worcester Bravehearts roster
Active roster	Coaching staff
Pitchers: TBD; Catchers: TBD; Infielders: TBD; Outfielders: TBD	Manager: -- Joe Galvin; Coaches: -- Dan Burrato (pitching); -- Vinny Eramo (hitting); Disabled list; ‡ Inactive list; § Suspended list; Roster updated April 30, 2025
