= Nashua Silver Knights =

Collegiate baseball team in New Hampshire, USA

Logo
Cap insignia

Information
- League: FCBL (2010–present)
- Location: Nashua, New Hampshire
- Ballpark: Holman Stadium
- Founded: 2010
- League championships: 6 (2011, 2012, 2016, 2017, 2020, 2022)
- Colors: Red, Black, Silver
- Mascot: Knoble
- Ownership: John Creedon, Jr.
- Management: Cam Cook
- Manager: Nick Guarino
- Media: All games are broadcast on the FCBL Network
- Website: NashuaSilverKnights.com

The Nashua Silver Knights is a collegiate summer baseball team based in Nashua, New Hampshire. It is a charter member of the Futures Collegiate Baseball League (FCBL), a wood-bat league with a 64-game regular season comprising eight teams ranging from New Hampshire to western Connecticut. The team's home games are played at Holman Stadium in Nashua. The team is owned by John Creedon Jr.

The Silver Knights are one of the seven FCBL teams playing in a stadium that used to host professional baseball. The Silver Knights have won the FCBL Championship in six of the league's fourteen years of existence. They are the only remaining member of the original four FCBL teams.

== Ownership ==
The Silver Knights were a charter team of the FCBL, as Drew Weber, former owner of the Lowell Spinners, wanted to also operate a franchise in the New England Collegiate Baseball League. When this was not feasible, Weber and others created the FCBL. Chris Hall, who had been the General Manager of professional and collegiate teams in Nashua, became the league's commissioner.

The name Knights was chosen over three other club nominations by a vote of Nashua grade-school students. The club modified the winner to "Silver Knights" to avoid conflict with an existing amateur baseball team in the city.

In March 2019 the team was sold to John Creedon Jr, owner of the Worcester Bravehearts.

== Results ==
2011

Mike Chambers was the first field manager, with B.J. Neverett and Tom Bowles assisting as coaches. The Silver Knights finished first in the regular season, with a 27–16 record. They defeated the Torrington Titans (25–17) in a best-of-three championship series. The Silver Knights drew an average of 869 spectators per game, far above initial expectations of 300–500 fans.

2012

The league expanded from four to nine teams. Neverett was promoted to field manager, with Bowles and J.P. Pyne assisting as coaches. The Silver Knights dominated the regular season with a 39–13 record. Then they swept through the Brockton Rox and North Shore Navigators to win their second consecutive FCBL Championship. PerfectGame.org named them the 26th best team in all of collegiate summer league baseball.

2013

Neverett was promoted to the front office as VP of Player Development. Pyne was promoted to field manager, with Bowles assisting as pitching coach. The regular-season record of 34–19 was one game behind the Martha's Vineyard Sharks (35–18). Both teams thus earned a bye from the "one-game play-in" instituted that year for the next-best four teams, and both teams won their best-of-three semifinal series in two games. But Martha's Vineyard, which had won 6 of the 7 regular-season contests against Nashua, won both games of the championship series.

2014

Ted Currle was hired as their field manager, with Jeff Dupont and Kyle Jackson assisting as coaches. Currle had managed the Martha's Vineyard Sharks in 2011 and was an assistant coach for the Brockton Rox in 2012 and 2013. The team spent most of the season around .500 and was one of four teams with similar records headed for the one-game play-in to the post-season. On August 8, the last day of the regular season, Nashua lost the right to host this play-in game, finishing the regular season at 28–26. Traveling to Torrington, Connecticut the next day, Nashua lost the play-in game in 11 innings.

2015

With the replacement of the Old Orchard Beach franchise by the Bristol Blues, Nashua moved to the East Division, joining in-state rival Seacoast Mavericks. The FCBL expanded the playoff format, allowing 8 of the 10 teams into the post-season but making the first two rounds a single game. The Silver Knights finished with a regular-season record of 28–28, fourth in the dominant East Division. They won the first-round playoff game at North Shore, but lost the second-round game the next day at Bristol. After the season, Drew Weber announced his intention to sell both the Silver Knights and the Spinners as a package.

2016

The FCBL returned to the 2014 format, in which only 6 of the 10 teams qualified for the post-season. B.J. Neverett moved out of the front office and back to the field as the team's manager and took the franchise to the FCBL championship. The Silver Knights dominated the East Division early, but eventually fell 2½ games behind Seacoast for the division title with a regular-season record of 34–21. This earned them the right to host the play-in game with Torrington, but the Silver Knights were seeded lower than their subsequent two opponents, each of which elected to start its best-of-three series at Nashua. Seacoast took the semifinal series to a full three games, each won by the visiting team. The Silver Knights won both games of the championship series against Worcester, now coached by J.P. Pyne.

Weber succeeded in selling the Spinners and took the Silver Knights off the market. Neverett's brother Tim became a radio broadcaster for the Boston Red Sox, and Silver Knights results were occasionally mentioned during those broadcasts. Tim's son Matt Neverett was one of the announcers of Silver Knights games on WSMN radio.

2017

The Silver Nights were one of several teams playing around the .500 mark. They finished the season at .491, an identical record to the Pittsfield Suns, which won the fourth seed and the right to host the one-game play-in game against Nashua on August 8 through the tie-breaker, a superior record against the other playoff teams. Fifth-seeded Nashua won the play-in game and swept the semifinals. The other finalist was the sixth-seeded Worcester Bravehearts, as all six playoff games in the first two rounds went to the lower-seeded team. Nashua elected to start the series at Worcester and won away and at home, repeating on August 12 as FCBL Champions. Cam Cook won the regular season batting title with an average of .397, he also broke the single season record for hits with 81. Ryan Sullivan won the MVP award for the Championship series.

2018

In the off-season, both General Manager Ronnie Wallace and Assistant GM Cheryl Lindner resigned within days of one another to take jobs outside baseball. Rick Muntean, a former General Manager of the Bristol Blues, was recruited as the new GM in Nashua. Manager B.J. Neverett took advantage of a liberalized FCBL rule allowing up to 5 "commits" (high-school graduates intending to play college baseball in the coming year), resulting in a distinctly younger team. A month into the season, the club signed power hitters who had excelled on nearby teams in the previous season, but the results were mixed. The league dropped from 9 to 7 teams, but the playoff rules continued to extend to the best 6. Nashua dropped out of contention, then surged in the last week to become the fifth seed. It lost the play-in game at Brockton.

2019

The FCBL started 2019 as a seven-team league again, as a new Westfield franchise balanced the defection of Martha's Vineyard to the NECBL. As the Seacoast Mavericks remained on hiatus, Nashua became the last of the four charter teams. Owner Drew Weber sold a minority stake to local businessmen and fired Muntean, appointing as co-General Managers team accountant Victoria Cookson and former mayoral candidate Michael Broderick. However, in March, Weber and the co-owners announced the sale of the club to John Creedon Jr., the owner of the Worcester Bravehearts. Creedon named Dave Pahucki the general manager in place of Weber's selections.

2020

The Futures League was one of the few leagues to play in the COVID-19 stricken summer. Playing a shortened season of 39 games, the Silver Knights went 23–16, finishing in 2nd place, ½ game behind the Worcester Bravehearts. The Silver Knights squared off against the Bravehearts in the championship for the third time in league history. After dropping game 1, the Silver Knights won games 2 and 3 to win their league leading 5th FCBL championship. Kyle Bouchard took home the MVP trophy.

2022

The Silver Knights won their sixth championship in 2022, recovering from a 4–12 start to earn the third seed in the playoffs. In the first round, Nashua swept the New Britain Bees. In the final series, the Knights faced the reigning FCBL champion Vermont Lake Monsters. Vermont hosted the opening game and won, 12–0. In Game Two in Nashua, the Knights overcame a 4–0 deficit and achieved a 6–5 victory. The rubber game, played in Vermont, was back-and-forth; Boston College's Kyle Wolff hit a two-run home run in the top of the ninth and the Knights won, 6–5. Amherst's Jack McDermott was the post-season MVP, hitting .400 with 3 HRs and 9 RBI.

== Season results and attendance ==
Year	Wins	Losses	Percentage	Place	Attendance	Playoff wins	Playoff losses	Playoff percentage	Playoff attendance
2011	27	16	.628	1st	19,127 (1st of 4)	2	0	1.000	1,331
2012	39	13	.750	1st	28,125 (3rd of 9)	4	0	1.000	2,233
2013	34	19	.642	2nd	34,249 (2nd of 9)	2	2	.500	1,964
2014	28	26	.519	3rd in West	35,760 (4th of 10)	0	1	.000	
2015	28	28	.500	4th in East	30,784 (5th of 10)	1	1	.500	
2016	34	21	.618	2nd in East	34,674 (5th of 10)	5	1	.833	4,191
2017	26	27–1	.491*	5th	35,044 (4th of 9)	5	0	1.000	3,826
2018	21	32	.396	5th	35,072 (2nd of 7)	0	1	.000	
2019	27	27	.500	6th	31,203 (4th of 7)	0	1	.000	
2020	23	16	.590	2nd	9,111 (2nd of 2)	2	1	.666	708
2021	27	39	.409	6th	33,293 (4rd of 8)	0	0	N/A	N/A
Total	314	264	.543		326,442	21	8	.724	14,253

* The -1 reflects one loss in a "Home Run Derby", treated as half a win. The .491 is the "points percentage" (see the FCBL article). The Pittsfield Suns had the same regular-season record, but owned the tie-breaker and hosted the single play-in game as the 4th seed.

== Post-season appearances ==
Year	Play-in round**		Semi-final round*		FCBL championship	
2011					Torrington Titans	W (2–0)
2012			Brockton Rox	W (2–0)	North Shore Navigators	W (2–0)
2013	bye		Brockton Rox	W (2–0)	Martha's Vineyard Sharks	L (0–2)
2014	Torrington Titans	L (0–1)				
2015	North Shore Navigators	W (1–0)	Bristol Blues	L (0–1)		
2016	Torrington Titans	W (1–0)	Seacoast Mavericks	W (2–1)	Worcester Bravehearts	W (2–0)
2017	Pittsfield Suns	W (1–0)	Bristol Blues	W (2–0)	Worcester Bravehearts	W (2–0)
2018	Brockton Rox	L (0–1)				
2019	North Shore Navigators	L (0–1)				
2020					Worcester Bravehearts	W (2–1)
2021			Did not qualify			
2022			New Britain Bees	W (2–0)	Vermont Lake Monsters	W (2–1)

- *The FCBL changed its postseason to a two-round format starting in the 2012 season.
- ** A one-game play-in round was added in the 2013 season and was discontinued in 2020.

== Managers ==
Manager	Years	Wins	Losses	Percentage	Playoff wins	Playoff losses	Playoff percentage	Championships
Mike Chambers	2011	27	16	.628	2	0	1.000	1
B.J. Neverett	2012; 16–19	147	120	.550	14	3	.824	3
J.P. Pyne	2013	34	19	.642	2	2	.500	0
Ted Currie	2014–15	56	54	.509	1	2	.333	0
Kyle Jackson	2020–Present	50	55	.476	2	1	.666	1

== Awards ==
Year	Award	Player	College
2011	Top Pitcher	Eric Perrault	Keene State
2011	Top Pro Prospect	Eric Perrault	Keene State
2011	Defensive Player of the Year	Rob Benedict	Wesley College
2011	Relief Pitcher of the Year	Dylan Maki	Northeastern University
2011	Batting Champion	Logan Gillis	Bentley University
2011	Manager of the Year	Mike Chambers	Franklin Pierce University
2012	Top Pro Prospect	Chris Shaw	Boston College
2012	Defensive Player of the Year	Connor Lyons	Northeastern University
2012	Manager of the Year	B.J. Neverett	
2013	Relief Pitcher of the Year	Cody Rocha	Assumption College
2013	Commissioner's Award	Manny Cabral	Texas Southern
2014	Commissioner's Award	Matt Mottola	UMass Lowell
2016	Most Valuable Player	Mickey Gasper	Bryant University
2016	Batting Champion	Mickey Gasper	Bryant University
2017	Batting Champion	Cam Cook	Nichols College
2017	Commissioner's Award	Ryan Sullivan	Southern New Hampshire University
2018	Pitcher of the Year	Brandon Dufault	Northeastern University
2020	Manager of the Year	Kyle Jackson	

== Team records ==
Single season

Individual	Name	School	Record	Year
Individual hitting
Batting average	Mickey Gasper	Bryant University	.421*	2016
Hits	Cam Cook	Nichols College	81*	2016
Doubles	Mickey Gasper	Bryant University	21*	2016
Triples	Yanni Thanopoulos	Amherst College	5	2016
Home runs	Ryan Sullivan	Southern New Hampshire University	15	2017
Extra-base hits	Mickey Gasper	Bryant University	31	2016
Runs batted in	Chris Shaw	Boston College	44	2012
Runs batted in	Shane McNamara	Southern New Hampshire University	44	2023
Walks	Matt Sanchez	UMass Lowell	41	2014
Stolen bases	Luca Giallongo	New England College	26	2023
On-base percentage	Mickey Gasper	Bryant University	.532*	2016
Slugging percentage	Mickey Gasper	Bryant University	.726	2016
On-base plus slugging percentage	Mickey Gasper	Bryant University	1.257*	2016
Individual pitching
Appearances	Lucas Olen	Southern New Hampshire University	24	2015
Innings	Geoff Fisher	UMass Lowell	59.0	2011
Wins	Geoff Fisher	UMass Lowell	7	2013
ERA	Nick Poore	Boston College	1.28	2012
Strikeouts	Alek Morency	Merrimack College	57	2013
Strikeouts	Drew Fischer	Amherst College	57	2016
Saves	Cody Rocha	Assumption College	17*	2013
Opponent batting average	Christopher Good	University of New Mexico	.198	2012
WHIP	Geoff Fisher	UMass Lowell	1.02	2011
Strikeouts per 9	Drew Fischer	Amherst College	11.23	2016

Career

Individual	Name	School	Record	Year
Individual hitting
Games	Ryan Sullivan	Southern New Hampshire University	185*	2013–17
At bats	Ryan Sullivan	Southern New Hampshire University	682*	2013–17
Batting average	Mickey Gasper	Bryant University	.421*	2016
Hits	Ryan Sullivan	Southern New Hampshire University	199*	2013–17
Doubles	Ryan Sullivan	Southern New Hampshire University	41*	2013–17
Triples	Yanni Thanopoulos	Amherst College	5	2016
Home runs	Ryan Sullivan	Southern New Hampshire University	37	2013–17
Extra-base hits	Ryan Sullivan	Southern New Hampshire University	78	2013–17
Runs batted in	Ryan Sullivan	Southern New Hampshire University	145*	2012
Walks	Logan Gillis	Bentley University	69	2011–12
Stolen bases	Matt Sanchez	UMass Lowell	35	2013–14
On-base percentage	Mickey Gasper	Bryant University	.532*	2016
Slugging percentage	Mickey Gasper	Bryant University	.726*	2016
On-base plus slugging percentage	Mickey Gasper	Bryant University	1.257*	2016
Individual pitching
Appearances	Lucas Olen	Southern New Hampshire University	24	2015
Innings	Geoff Fisher	UMass Lowell	59.0	2011
Wins	Geoff Fisher	UMass Lowell	7	2013
ERA	Nick Poore	Boston College	1.28	2012
Strikeouts	Alek Morency	Merrimack College	57	2013
Strikeouts	Drew Fischer	Amherst College	57	2016
Saves	Cody Rocha	Assumption College	17*	2013
Opponent batting average	Christopher Good	University of New Mexico	.198	2012
WHIP	Geoff Fisher	UMass Lowell	1.02	2011
Strikeouts per 9	Drew Fischer	Amherst College	11.23	2016

* Futures Collegiate Baseball League record

== Roster ==
Nashua Silver Knights roster
Active roster	Coaching staff
Pitchers: 31 Jake Boudreau; 10 Andrew Chenevert; 53 Mike Crowley; 54 Matt Fitzgibbon; 32 Josh Florence; 35 Rob Gilchrist; 34 Garrett Hammer; 49 Ethan Hunt; 23 Relfin Jimenez; 25 Scott Longo; 44 Matt Mahoney; 52 Thomas Mahoney; 15 Nolan Mederos; 45 Brandon Metivier; 46 Robby Roth; 30 Kevin Rourke; 20 Brennan Rumpf; 5 Jake Zawatsky; Catchers: 38 James Benestad; 19 Will Burns; 27 Joey Current; Infielders: 4 Jack Forgues; 18 Anthony Grabau; 14 Matt Hall; 6 Jordan Henriquez; 8 Chase Roberts; 22 Will Shaheen; 1 Patrick Shrake; 29 Dave Yorke; 12 Joseph Zorc; Outfielders: 39 Jack Balcer; 7 Jake Haarde; 50 Dylan Littlefield; 41 Cole Patterson; 43 Jeremy Ramos; 9 Ryan Strand	Manager: -- Nick Guarino; Coaches: -- Spencer Bergeron (pitching); -- Steven Mooney (assistant); Disabled list; ‡ Inactive list; § Suspended list; Roster updated April 30, 2025

== Alumni in professional baseball ==
Player	Position	Years with Nashua	Highest level of competition
Rob Benedict	Shortstop	2011	Independent baseball league
Kyle Bonicki	Shortstop	2017	Independent baseball league
Max Burt	Second Base	2015	Minor League Baseball
Brandon Dufault	Pitcher	2018	Minor League Baseball
Andrew Chin	Pitcher	2012	Minor League Baseball
Drew Fischer	Pitcher	2016	Minor League Baseball
Mickey Gasper	Catcher	2016	Major League Baseball
Tyler Gauthier	Pitcher	2011	Minor League Baseball
Jon Minucci	Outfielder	2011–12	Independent baseball league
Eric Perrault	Pitcher	2011	Independent baseball league
Lamarre Rey	Pitcher/First Base	2011–12	Independent baseball league
Chris Shaw	First Base	2012	Major League Baseball
Steve Rogers	Third Base	2012	Independent baseball league

== See also ==
- Futures Collegiate Baseball League
- Collegiate summer baseball
