= Matt Koperniak =

English-American baseball player (born 1998)

Free agent
- Outfielder
- Born: February 8, 1998 (age 28); London, United Kingdom
- Bats: Left Throws: Right
- Stats at Baseball Reference

Matthew Hayden Koperniak (born February 8, 1998) is an American professional baseball outfielder who is a free agent.

== Amateur career ==
Koperniak was born in London, United Kingdom, where his father was stationed, but moved to Adams, Massachusetts at age two. He attended Hoosac Valley High School, where he played baseball, basketball, and football.

Koperniak attended Trinity College and played college baseball for the Trinity Bantams. He batted for a .310 average as a freshman. He was named first team All-New England Small College Athletic Conference (NESCAC) after batting .388 with 47 hits, five home runs, and 20 runs batted in (RBIs) in 33 games played. As a junior, Koperniak batted .394 with 63 hits, 13 doubles, three triples, six home runs, and 31 RBIs. In the summer of 2018, he played for the North Adams SteepleCats in the New England Collegiate Baseball League and in 2019, briefly played collegiate summer baseball with the Harwich Mariners of the Cape Cod Baseball League before returning to play with the SteepleCats. Koperniak's senior season was cancelled after three games due to the coronavirus pandemic. After graduating from Trinity in 2020 with a Bachelor of Science degree in Biology, he initially intended to transfer to Kansas State University for his final season of collegiate eligibility.

== Professional career ==
The St. Louis Cardinals signed Koperniak as an undrafted free agent on June 16, 2020. He was assigned to the Palm Beach Cardinals of Low-A Southeast at the start of the 2021 season. He slashed .322 /.443 /.470 in 58 games with Palm Beach before being promoted to Peoria Chiefs of High-A Central at the beginning of August. Koperniak had six hits in 14 at-bats over four games for the Chiefs and was promoted a second time to the Double-A Springfield Cardinals. Over 95 games total between the three affiliates, he hit .306 with seven home runs, 41 RBI, and 25 doubles.

He returned to Springfield for the 2022 season and also played in two games for the Triple-A Memphis Redbirds. Over 108 games between the two teams, Koperniak slashed .291/.364/.443 with 14 home runs, 59 RBI, and 12 stolen bases.

Koperniak split time between Springfield and Memphis again in 2023, slashing .287/.362/.427 with 18 home runs, 85 RBI, and 11 stolen bases over 129 games.

Koperniak played in 122 games for the Memphis Redbirds in 2024, slashing .309/.370/.512 with 20 home runs and 73 RBI. Following the season, the Cardinals added Koperniak to their 40-man roster to protect him from the Rule 5 draft.

Koperniak was optioned to Triple-A Memphis to begin the 2025 season. In 121 appearances for Memphis, he slashed .246/.317/.382 with 14 home runs, 65 RBI, and nine stolen bases. On December 17, 2025, Koperniak was designated for assignment following the signing of Dustin May. He cleared waivers and was sent outright to Memphis on December 19.

Koperniak made 54 appearances for Triple–A Memphis in 2026, slashing .253/.324/.339 with three home runs, 33 RBI, and four stolen bases. He was released by St. Louis on July 13, 2026.

== International career ==
Koperniak played for the Great Britain national baseball team in the 2023 World Baseball Classic and 2026 World Baseball Classic.
