= Torrington Titans =

Information
- League: FCBL (West Division)
- Location: Torrington, CT (2010-2016)
- Ballpark: Fuessenich Park (2010-2016)
- Founded: 2010
- Former league(s): ACBL (2010); Kaiser Division (2010)
- Colors: Blue, Red
- Ownership: Torrington Baseball Group, LLC
- Management: Chris Myslow (GM)
- Manager: Kyle Decker
- Website: torringtontitans.com

The Torrington Titans were a collegiate summer baseball team that played in the Futures Collegiate Baseball League (FCBL) of New England. They played their inaugural season in the Atlantic Collegiate Baseball League, a collegiate summer baseball league. After leading the ACBL in attendance in 2010, the team was sold to the Carminucci Sports Group (CSG), which transferred the team to the newly founded FCBL. The Titans played home games at Fuessenich Park in downtown Torrington.

On December 20, 2016, the Futures League published a 2017 schedule for a nine-team league not including the Titans. General Manager Chris Myslow told the Register Citizen that he had parted ways with the team in October 2016, and FCBL Commissioner Chris Hall would say no more than confirm that the league will play without the Titans in 2017.

== Staff ==
=== Field ===
The Titans' field manager is Zack LaRosa. LaRosa returned to Torrington having been a part of the team in 2014, helping them make a run to the semifinals. LaRosa was assisted by Mike Grant and Ray Krieger.

=== Front office ===
Chris Myslow, of Simsbury, Connecticut, was named the team's President and General Manager in March 2015, and served in that position through the 2016 season, but claimed to have parted ways with the team that October. Myslow previously worked for ESPN and professional golfer Arnold Palmer.

== Baseball advisory board ==
On March 25, 2011, former Detroit Tiger and World Series Champion Cecil Fielder was named to the Torrington Titans baseball advisory board. Fielder assisted in player development and some community outreach.

On April 2, 2011, former major leaguer Pete Incaviglia and former first overall pick Kash Beauchamp were also named to the Torrington Titans baseball advisory board. The board aided professional development for Titans players.

== Postseason Appearances ==
Year	Play-In Round**		Divisional Series*		FCBL Championship	
2011					Nashua Silver Knights	L (0-2)
2012			North Shore Navigators	L (1-2)		
2014	Nashua Silver Knights	W	Martha's Vineyard Sharks	L (0-2)		
2015	Bristol Blues	L				

  - The FCBL changed its postseason to a two-round format starting in the 2012 season
    - A one-game Play-In round was added in the 2013 season
