= Cardines =

Cardines may refer to:

- The plural word for Cardo, north–south street in ancient Roman cities
- Cardines Field, baseball stadium in Newport, Rhode Island.
- Rio Cardines (born 2006), Trinidadian footballer
