= Holman Stadium =

Holman Stadium may refer to the following sports venues in the United States:

- Holman Stadium (Nashua), New Hampshire
- Holman Stadium (Vero Beach), Florida
