= Eastern Baseball Stadium =

American collegiate baseball stadium

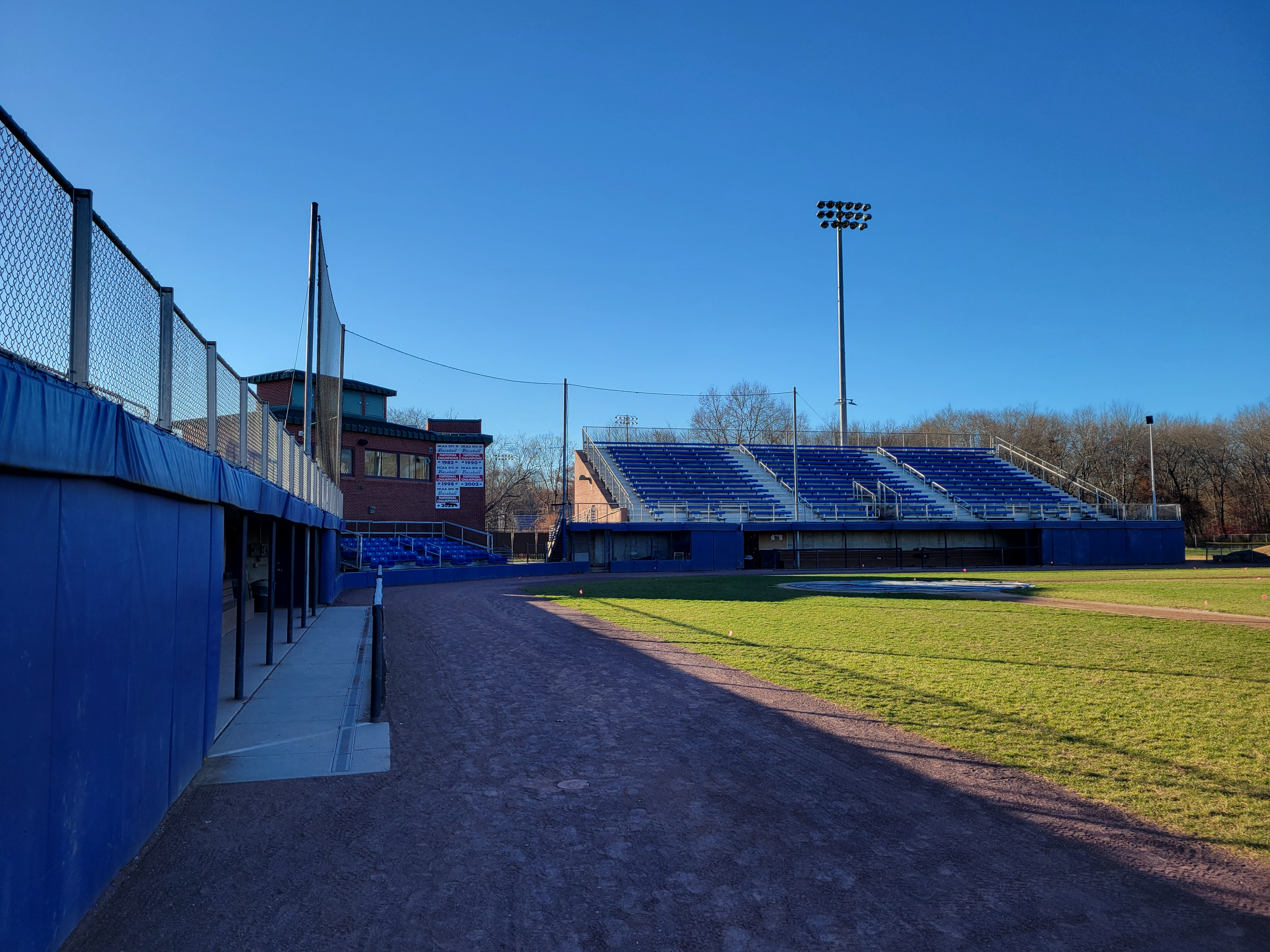
- Interactive map of Eastern Baseball Stadium
- Location: Campus of Eastern Connecticut State University; Willimantic, Connecticut, United States
- Coordinates: 41.734499°N 72.217866°W
- Owner: Eastern Connecticut State University
- Operator: Eastern Connecticut State University
- Capacity: 1,500
- Surface: Natural grass
- Field size: Left field: 330 feet (100 m); Center field: 407 feet (124 m); Right field: 330 feet (100 m)

Tenants
- Eastern Connecticut State Warriors (NCAA DIII Little East) (1998-present); Thread City Tides/Eastern Tides (NECBL) (1998-2003)

Eastern Baseball Stadium is a baseball stadium located on the campus of Eastern Connecticut State University in Willimantic, Connecticut, United States.

The stadium was opened in 1998. It has a seating capacity of 1,500. Its primary tenant is the Eastern Connecticut State University college baseball team. The stadium has also hosted several NCAA Division III regional baseball tournaments and was home to the collegiate summer Thread City Tides from 1998 to 2003.
