= North Adams SteepleCats =

Collegiate sports team

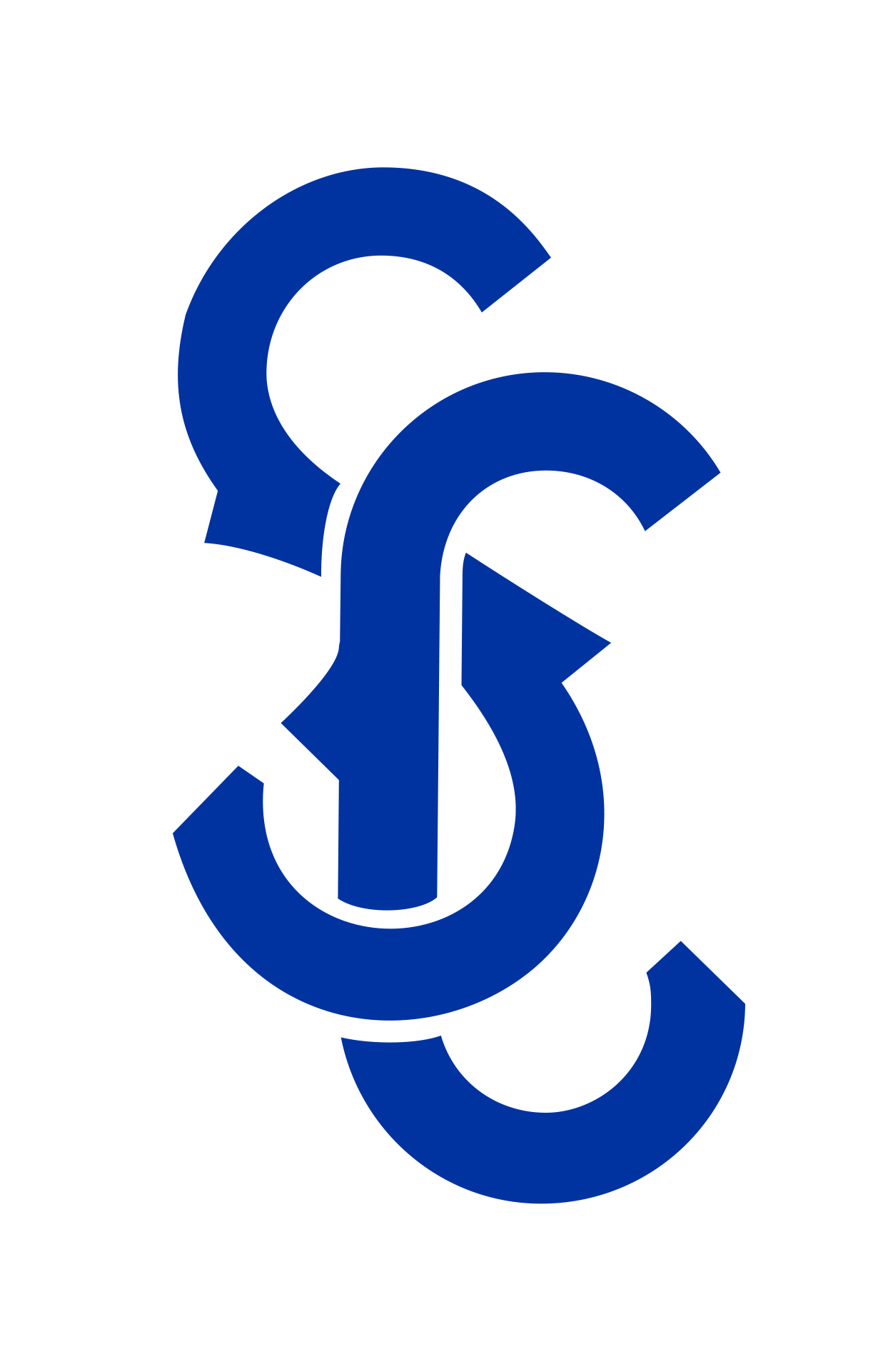

Information
- League: NECBL (Northern 2014–present)
- Location: North Adams, MA (2002–present)
- Ballpark: Joe Wolfe Field (2002–present)
- Founded: 2002
- Nickname(s): Cats
- Regular-Season Division championships: 1 (2010)
- Playoff berths: 13
- Former name(s): North Adams SteepleCats (2002–present)
- Former league(s): NECBL; Southern Division (2005–2008); Northern Division (2004, 2014–present); Western Division (2002, 2009–2013)
- Colors: Black, Gold
- Ownership: Community Ownership
- Management: Paul Procopio, General Manager
- President: Paul Procopio
- Manager: Ryan Abel
- Media: Twitter: https://www.twitter.com/steeplecats Facebook: https://www.facebook.com/SteepleCats; YouTube: https://www.youtube.com/NASteeplecats; Instagram: https://www.insatgram.com/steeplecats
- Website: steeplecats.org

The North Adams SteepleCats are a Collegiate summer baseball team based in North Adams, Massachusetts, United States. The team, a member of the New England Collegiate Baseball League, plays its home games at Joe Wolfe Field in North Adams.

== Postseason appearances ==
Year	Division Semi-Finals		Division Finals		NECBL Championship Series
North Adams SteepleCats
2002	Newport Gulls	L (1–2)			
2003	Sanford Mainers	L (0-2)			
2004	Sanford Mainers	L (1–2)			
2005	Manchester Silkworms	W (2–1)	Newport Gulls	L (0-2)	
2006	Torrington Twisters	L (0-2)			
2007	Newport Gulls	L (1–2)			
2008	Pittsfield Dukes	L (0-2)			
2009	Vermont Mountaineers	L (0-2)			
2010	Keene Swamp Bats	W (2–1)	Danbury Westerners	L (1–2)	
2012	Danbury Westerners	L (1–2)			
2013	Vermont Mountaineers	L (0-2)			
2015	Sanford Mainers	W (2–1)	Vermont Mountaineers	L (1–2)	
2016	Valley Blue Sox	L (1–2)			
2025	Sanford Mainers	L (1–2)			

== SteepleCats alumni ==
Former SteepleCats Joe Smith, Bobby Wilson, Mike Ekstrom, Blake Davis, Evan Scribner and Cody Stanley have played in the major leagues. SteepleCats alumni who have gone on to play minor league baseball include Matt Koperniak, Eric Brown, Cole Gillespie, Chris Homer, Kris Watts, Davis Bilardello, Derrick Alfonso, Chris Cates, Jeremy Hamilton, Logan Johnson, Brandon Menchaca, Matt Morizio, Timothy Pahuta, Anthony Seratelli, Chantz Mack, Jeff Roy, Scott Squier, John Servidio, Vinny Siena, Josh Delph, Nathan Foriest, J C Cardenas, Joeanthony Rivera, Kevin Martir, José Cuas, Tyler Palmer, Sheehan Planas-Arteaga, Dillon McNamara, Christian MacDonald, Cameron Griffin, Brett Frantini, Brian Gilbert, Cameron Copping, Marc Magliaro, Robert Nixon, Cory Vogt, Devin Shines, Cam Kneeland, Tyler Deloach, Sean Albury, Guido Knudson, Eric Perrault, Brandon Macias, David Villasuso, Dylan Silva, Noah Vaughan, and Liam Sabino.

== See also ==
- New England Collegiate Baseball League
