= Upper Valley Nighthawks =

- Logo

Information
- League: NECBL (Northern Division)
- Location: Hartford, Vermont (2016–present)
- Ballpark: Maxfield Sports Complex (2016–present)
- Founded: 2015
- Colors: Navy, blue, neon yellow, black, white
- Ownership: Noah Crane
- Manager: Chase Allen
- Website: Official website

The Upper Valley Nighthawks are a collegiate summer baseball team based in Hartford, Vermont. The team, a member of the New England Collegiate Baseball League (NECBL), plays their home games at the Maxfield Sports Complex. The team began play in 2016 under the direction of the Crane Family. The Cranes previously founded and operated the Laconia Muskrats in the NECBL.

== History ==
The inaugural team was managed by Nick Cenatiempo and finished 21-25. The team qualified for the playoffs in their first season by winning a 4 team play-in scenario. The Nighthawks, the Vermont Mountaineers, the Keene Swampbats, and the Winnipesaukee Muskrats all tied for the fourth playoff spot in 2016. The Nighthawks defeated the Muskrats in game one and the Swampbats in game two. The Nighthawks were the first team to win a four team play-in and will be the last, as the NECBL changed the playoff tie-breaker rules in 2017.

The 2017 team, managed by Jason Szafarski, finished 29-15 and finished in 1st place in the Northern Division. They lost in the Divisional Championship to the eventual NECBL champion Valley Blue Sox. The team had a record 9 NECBL All Stars.

The 2018 team finished 22-21, finishing in fourth place. The team was again managed by Jason Szafarski and produced 5 NECBL All Stars.

The 2019 team finished 24-20, finishing in fourth place. The team was managed by Keller Bradford, a former Nighthawk player and the son of former Major League Baseball pitcher, Chad Bradford. The team produced 4 NECBL All Stars. Aaron Haase (Wichita State) was named the Joe Nathan Top Relief Pitcher and Cole Frederick won the NECBL batting title (.396).

The 2020 NECBL season was cancelled due to the Coronavirus (COVID) Pandemic.

The 2021 Nighthawks, managed by former Nighthawk, Justin Devoid, finished the season 23-18 overall, good for second place in the Northern Division. They survived a 12-inning affair at home against the Winnipesaukee Muskrats in the wildcard round of the playoffs, walking off 7-6 on a bloop single by Brett Callahan (Saint Joseph’s). Upper Valley then swept North Adams (2-0) in the league quarterfinals. They fell in the NECBL semifinals to the North Shore Navigators. This was the furthest the franchise had advanced in the playoffs. The team led the NECBL in BAVG (.276), set the single season record for stolen bases (125), and produced 3 All-NECBL first team selections alongside 7 all-stars, including all-star game MVP Max Viera (Northeastern).

The 2022 Nighthawks finished 19-23. The team was again managed by Justin Devoid, and produced 7 NECBL All Stars.

The 2023 Nighthawks team, now managed by Mat Pause, finished 18-24, third in the North Division standings. The team produced 6 NECBL All Stars, which included the all-star game MVP Kevin Bruggeman (Hofstra).

The 2024 team finished 18-24 and was managed by Mat Pause. The team produced 6 All Stars.

The 2025 team finished 18-26 under third year manager, Mat Pause. The team qualified for the playoffs but was swept by the eventual NECBL champion Keene SwampBats. The team produced 4 All Stars.

The 2026 team finished 24-18-1 under first year manager, Chase Allen. The team finished second in the Northern Division and made the playoffs but lost to the Danbury Westerners in the first round. The team produced 5 All Stars.

The first Nighthawk alumnus to reach Major League Baseball was 2nd round draft pick Ryan Jeffers. Jeffers made his MLB debut for the Minnesota Twins on August 20, 2020. Jeffers played in the Upper Valley in 2017 and was an NECBL All Star. The second alumnus to reach Major League Baseball was Cam Alldred. Alldred made his debut for the Pittsburgh Pirates on May 12, 2022. Alldred also played for Upper Valley in 2017. The third alumnus to reach Major League Baseball was Brett Callahan. Callahan made his debut on August 16, 2026 and played for Upper Valley in 2021
