= Plymouth Pilgrims (NECBL) =

Baseball team

Logo
Cap insignia

Information
- League: NECBL (Southern Division)
- Location: Plymouth, Massachusetts
- Ballpark: Forges Field
- Founded: 2013
- Folded: 2018
- Colors: Blue, White, Red
- Ownership: Peter Plant, Kevin Plant
- President: Peter Plant
- General manager: Kevin Plant
- Manager: Greg Zackrison
- Website: Official website

The Plymouth Pilgrims were a collegiate summer baseball team based in Plymouth, Massachusetts, United States. The team, a member of the New England Collegiate Baseball League (NECBL), played its home games at Forges Field in Plymouth.

The Pilgrims went 15–28 in their inaugural season of 2013, finishing with the worst record in the NECBL. Outfielder Andrew Santomauro from Lafayette College was the lone award winner from the Pilgrims, winning the Most Improved Player Award. Catcher Garrett Stubbs, Santomauro, and pitcher Travis Stout represented the Pilgrims in the All-Star Game.

In 2014, the Pilgrims won 31 games, clinching the best record in the league and were one win away from tying the best record in NECBL history. Ten Pilgrims made the All-Star team: Pitchers Thomas Jankins, Nick Berger, Vincenzo Aiello and Danny Garcia, catchers Matt Walsh and Logan Koch, first baseman Vin Guglietti, second baseman Thomas Roulis and outfielders Mike Martin and James Bunn. The Pilgrims coaching staff also coached the Southern Division All-Stars. Outfielder Brent Rooker participated in the Home Run Derby, but was not on the roster.

During the 2015 season, the Pilgrims failed to make the playoffs with a 20–22 record, but did feature the NECBL Most Improved Player and League MVP, Brent Rooker of Mississippi State.

In November 2016, Peter and Kevin Plant were approved by the NECBL as the new owners and operators of the Plymouth Pilgrims.

In November 2018, the Pilgrims ceased operations. The team president cited financial concerns as the reason for closing.
