= Paul Walsh Field =

Sports facility in Massachusetts, US

- Interactive map of Paul Walsh Field
- Location: Parker Street and Hunter Street, New Bedford, Massachusetts, US
- Coordinates: 41.642273°N 70.946751°W

Tenant
- New Bedford Bay Sox (NECBL) (2009–2019)

Paul Walsh Field is a multi-purpose sports facility located in New Bedford, Massachusetts, United States. The field is part of the athletic facilities of nearby New Bedford High School. Its primary use is for baseball. Specifically, it served as the former home of the New Bedford Bay Sox of the New England Collegiate Baseball League, a collegiate summer baseball league. The Bay Sox hold a non-exclusive contract for usage of the field, allowing for interscholastic sporting events to continue to be played at the facility.

== Arsenic issue ==
In the summer of 2008 arsenic was discovered on both of the facility's baseball diamonds. While the arsenic was found in moderate amounts, officials did not believe it posed immediate danger to the public. It is believed the arsenic levels stem back to the location's industrial usage during the 1960s. Remediation of the field, involving the replacing of arsenic-poisoned grass and soil, began in November 2008.

== Bay Sox attendance ==
The following is a list of New Bedford Bay Sox attendance figures since the team began playing at Paul Walsh Field in 2009.

Season	Game Avg.	Season Total	Lge. Rk.
2009	1,128	23,700	5th
2010	371	7,412	9th
2011	1,046	20,925	5th
2012	247	5,182	10th
