= Ryan Jeffers =

American baseball player (born 1997)

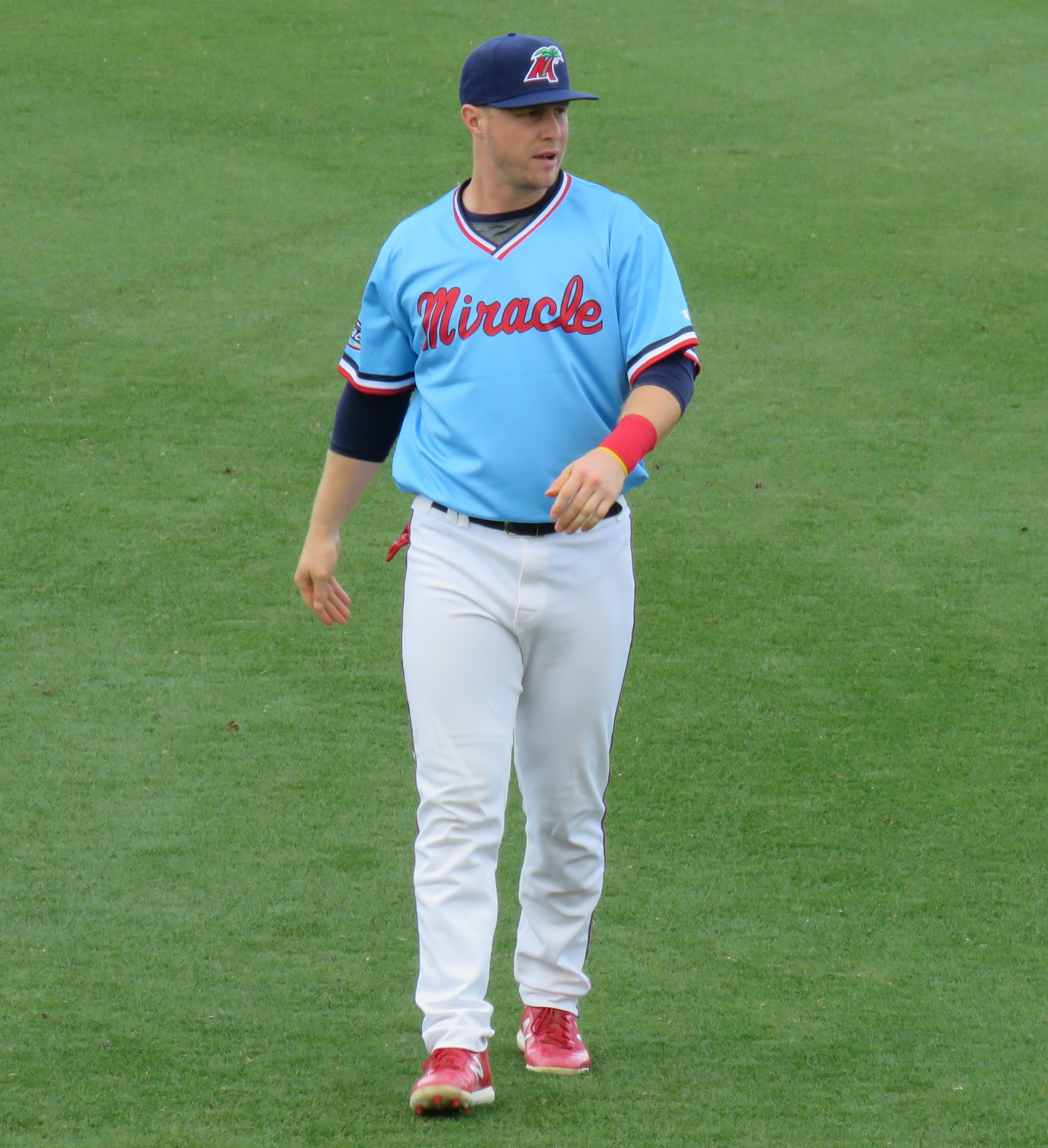
- Jeffers with the Fort Myers Miracle in 2019

Minnesota Twins – No. 27
- Catcher / Designated hitter
- Born: June 3, 1997 (age 29); Raleigh, North Carolina, U.S.
- Bats: Right Throws: Right

MLB debut
- August 20, 2020, for the Minnesota Twins

MLB statistics (through 2026 season)
- Batting average: .242
- Home runs: 82
- Runs batted in: 279
- Stats at Baseball Reference

Teams
- Minnesota Twins (2020–present)

Ryan Michael Jeffers (born June 3, 1997) is an American professional baseball catcher and designated hitter for the Minnesota Twins of Major League Baseball (MLB). He made his MLB debut in 2020.

== Amateur career ==
Jeffers attended Sanderson High School in Raleigh, North Carolina. In 2015, his senior year, he hit .398 with two home runs. Undrafted in the 2016 Major League Baseball draft, he enrolled at the University of North Carolina at Wilmington where he walked-on to the UNC Wilmington Seahawks baseball team.

In 2017, Jeffers' freshman year at UNC Wilmington, he appeared in only 13 games, but hit .348 with one home run and five RBI. That summer, he played in the Coastal Plain League for the Wilmington Sharks. As a sophomore in 2018, he started 52 of 53 games and batted .328 with ten home runs and 32 RBI, earning First-Team All-CAA honors. After the season, he played for the Upper Valley Nighthawks of the New England Collegiate Baseball League where he earned All-Star honors. In 2018, Jeffers' junior season at UNC Wilmington, he slashed .315/.460/.635 with 16 home runs and 59 RBI over 62 starts, earning a First-Team All-CAA selection for the second consecutive year.

== Professional career ==
=== Minor leagues ===
After his junior year, Jeffers was selected by the Minnesota Twins in the second round with the 59th overall selection of the 2018 Major League Baseball draft. He signed with the Twins and made his professional debut with the Elizabethton Twins before he was promoted to the Cedar Rapids Kernels in July. Over 64 games between the two clubs, he slashed .344/.444/.502 with seven home runs and 33 RBI. In 2019, he began the year with the Fort Myers Miracle, with whom he was named a Florida State League All-Star, before being promoted to the Pensacola Blue Wahoos in July, with whom he finished the season. Playing in 103 total games with both teams, Jeffers batted .264/.341/.421 with 14 home runs and 49 RBI.

=== Major leagues ===
On August 20, 2020, Jeffers’ contract was selected by the Twins to the active roster. He made his MLB debut that same day against the Milwaukee Brewers, recording two hits including one RBI over three at-bats in a 7–1 win. He hit his first career MLB home run on September 7 off Michael Fulmer of the Detroit Tigers. Jeffers finished the season with a .273/.355/.436 slash line with three home runs and seven RBI over 26 games.

To start the 2021 season, Jeffers was named to his first ever Opening Day roster. He was optioned to the Triple-A St. Paul Saints in April, and recalled to the Twins on June 2. He spent the remainder of the season with the Twins, and slashed .199/.270/.401 with 14 home runs and 35 RBI over 85 games.

Jeffers was named to Minnesota's Opening Day roster for the 2022 season. On July 16, 2022, the Twins placed Jeffers on the injured list with a right thumb contusion. On September 27, he was activated off of the injured list. In 67 games for the Twins in 2022, Jeffers hit .208/.285/.363 with seven home runs and 27 RBI.

In 2023, Jeffers appeared in 96 games (86 at catcher) and hit .276 with 14 home runs and 43 RBI. In 2024, he played in 122 games and batted .226 with 21 home runs and 64 RBI. Jeffers appeared in 119 games for the Twins in 2025 and hit .266 with nine home runs, 47 RBI, and 26 doubles. He missed time in September after suffering a concussion.

Prior to the 2026 season, Jeffers and the Twins agreed on a one-year deal worth $6.7 million, avoiding salary arbitration. On May 19, 2026, Jeffers was diagnosed with a fractured hamate bone in his left wrist. It was subsequently announced that he would require surgery and miss 6-to-8 weeks. He was activated from the injured list on July 10. Jeffers played in a total of 92 games and batted .256 with 14 home runs and 56 RBI. On November 17, 2026, Jeffers accepted a $23.15 million qualifying offer to return to the Twins for the 2027 season.

== Personal life ==
Jeffers and his wife, Lexi, married in 2019.
