= New Bedford Bay Sox =

Collegiate summer baseball team

Logo
Cap insignia

Information
- League: NECBL (Southern Division)
- Location: New Bedford, MA (2009–2019)
- Ballpark: Paul Walsh Field (2009–2019)
- Founded: 1997
- Folded: 2019
- Post-Season Division championships: 4 (1997, 1998, 2003, 2006)
- Regular-Season Division championships: 4 (2001, 2002, 2004, 2007)
- Former name: Torrington Twisters (1997–2008)
- Former leagues: NECBL; Southern Division (2004–2008); Western Division (2002); National Division (2001)
- Former ballpark: Fuessenich Park (1997–2008)
- Colors: Navy, Red
- Mascot: Slamu the whale
- Ownership: Stephen King (President)
- General manager: Tammy Silveira
- Manager: Chris Cabe
- Website: www.nbbaysox.com

The New Bedford Bay Sox were a baseball team that played in the New England Collegiate Baseball League, a collegiate summer baseball league operating in the New England region of the United States. The team was located in New Bedford, Massachusetts, and called Paul Walsh Field its home ballpark for eleven seasons.

== History ==
=== Relocation ===
Former Twisters Logo (1997–2007)

On December 17, 2008, Torrington Twisters owners Robin Wadsworth and Rita Hubner, along with New Bedford mayor Scott W. Lang, announced the relocation of the franchise from Torrington, Connecticut, to New Bedford, Massachusetts. Also made public was that the team had entered into an agreement to lease the city's Paul Walsh Field for three seasons. At the press conference, Wadsworth was quoted as saying, "New Bedford has a sense of pride, community and passion that clearly shines through; their enthusiasm is second to none. It quickly became a virtual no-brainer, the minute we engaged with Mayor Lang, Matt Morrissey and other community leaders." The team, renamed the New Bedford Bay Sox, made its debut on June 4, 2009, in front of a home crowd of nearly 4,000 fans.

On December 26, 2010, changes were announced in the Bay Sox ownership. While owners Wadsworth and Hubner maintained their positions, Tewksbury, Massachusetts residents Jim and Effie Dragon joined as minority partners in the operation. All owners voiced their interest in keeping the team in New Bedford.

In October 2011, Pat and Beth O'Connor – owners of the Little Fenway, Little Wrigley, and Little Field of Dreams Wiffle ball parks in Essex, Vermont – purchased majority interest in the Bay Sox from Wadsworth and Hubner. The O'Connors would operate the team for the next five seasons.

One of the O'Connors' first moves was to hire former MLB player Rick Miller as the Bay Sox manager in November 2011. In his debut season at the helm, the former Boston Red Sox and California Angels outfielder would be named the NECBL's 2012 Manager of the Year.

After three years as Bay Sox manager, Miller retired at the conclusion of the 2014 season. He was succeeded by his pitching coach, Westport, Massachusetts, native and former Boston Red Sox draft pick Kyle Fernandes. Fernandes led the Bay Sox to back-to-back postseason appearances in his two seasons as manager.

In December 2016, local ownership took control of the Bay Sox when the O'Connors sold most of their shares in the team to Stephen King and Tammy Silveira. The pair would oversee operation of the ball club for its final three seasons, with Silveira serving as the club's general manager. Unfortunately, said campaigns saw the team finish last in the NECBL's Southern Division for three straight years. Exacerbating the team's woes in 2019 was the fact that nine of 21 Bay Sox home games were postponed by rain. At the conclusion of the season, it was announced that the Bay Sox were suspending operations and would not return to the NECBL in 2020.

== Franchise postseason appearances ==
Year	Division Semi-Finals		Division Finals*		NECBL Championship Series	
Torrington Twisters
1997			Danbury Westerners	W (2–0)	Middletown Giants	L (1–2)
1998			Rhode Island Gulls	W (2–0)	Middletown Giants	L (1–2)
2001			Keene Swamp Bats	L (1–2)		
2002	Keene Swamp Bats	L (1–2)				
2003	Middletown Giants	W (2–0)	Newport Gulls	W (2–0)	Keene Swamp Bats	L (0–2)
2004	Newport Gulls	L (1–2)				
2006	North Adams SteepleCats	W (2–0)	Newport Gulls	W (2–0)	Vermont Mountaineers	L (0–2)
2007	Manchester Silkworms	W (2–0)	Newport Gulls	L (0–2)		
New Bedford Bay Sox
2009	Newport Gulls	L (0–2)				
2012	Laconia Muskrats	W (2–0)	Newport Gulls	L (0–2)		
2015	Mystic Schooners	L (0–2)				
2016	Mystic Schooners	L (1–2)				

- *The NECBL did not separate into divisions until 2001.

== MLB alumni ==
Year	Player	Position	MLB team
1999	Kurt Birkins	LHP	Baltimore Orioles
1999	Mike Rabelo	C	Detroit Tigers
1999	Sean Green	RHP	Seattle Mariners
1999	Bobby Korecky	RHP	Minnesota Twins
2000	Charlton Jimerson	CF	Houston Astros
2003	Mike Parisi	RHP	St. Louis Cardinals
2006	Josh Zeid	RHP	Houston Astros
2006	Andrew Albers	LHP	Minnesota Twins
2007	Stephen Strasburg	RHP	Washington Nationals
2008	Steven Geltz	RHP	Los Angeles Angels of Anaheim
2008	Eric Jokisch	RHP	Chicago Cubs
2008	Josh Smith	RHP	Cincinnati Reds
2009	Eric Goeddel	RHP	New York Mets
2009	Andrew Triggs	RHP	Oakland Athletics

- Chris Shaw, member of the 2013 Bay Sox team, was drafted in the 1st round (31st overall selection) by the San Francisco Giants in the 2015 MLB Draft. Shaw is currently ranked 3rd in the Giants' farm system.
- Jared Shuster (born 1998), baseball pitcher, first round 2020 MLB draft pick
