= Alumni Field (Keene) =

Baseball field in New Hampshire, United States

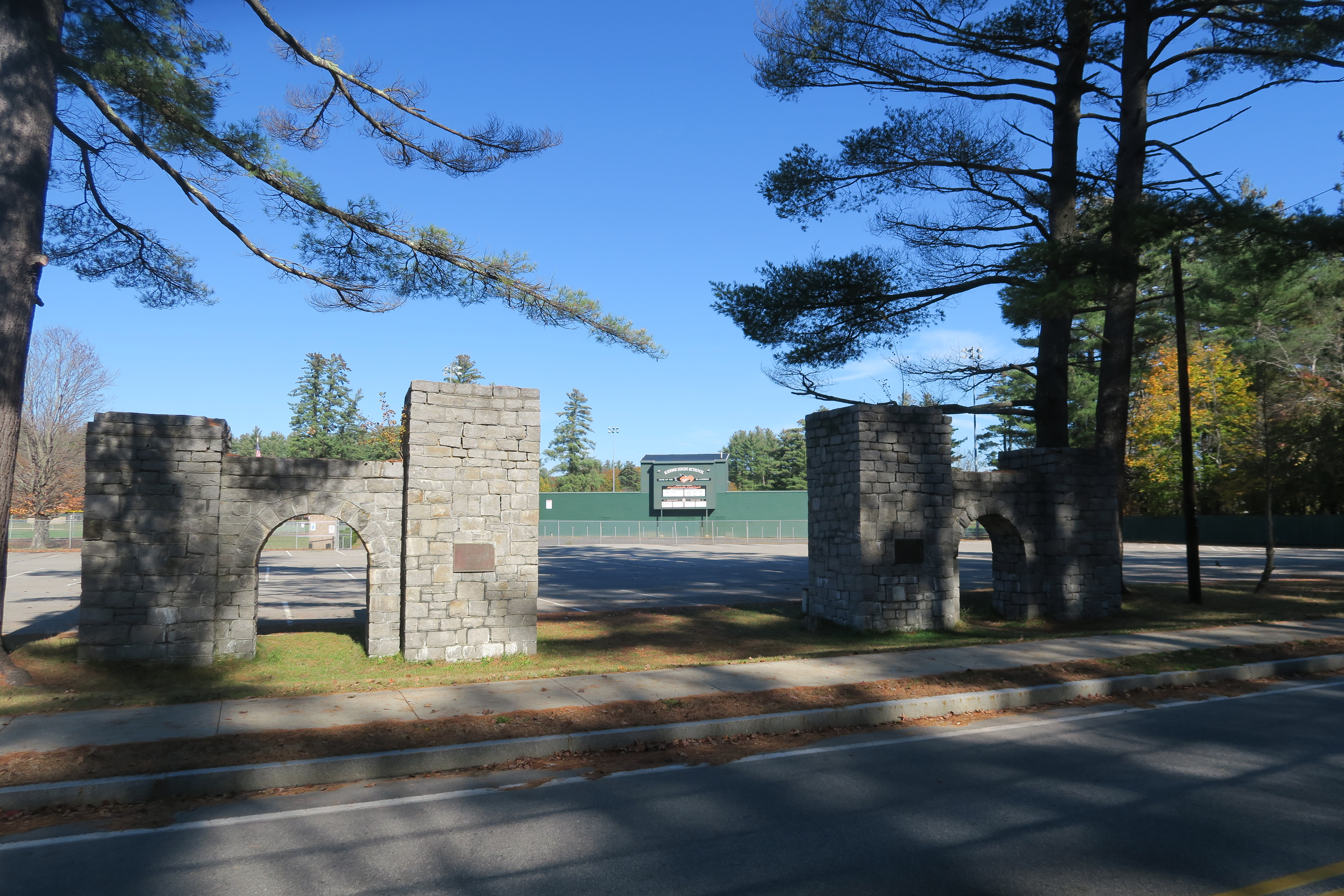
- Interactive map of Alumni Field
- Location: 77 Arch Street, Keene, New Hampshire, USA
- Coordinates: 42.94008°N 72.31934°W
- Owner: Alumni Association
- Capacity: 4,100
- Surface: Natural Grass
- Scoreboard: Yes

Construction
- Built: 1948

Tenant
- Keene Swamp Bats (NECBL) (1997–present)

Alumni Field is a baseball field located in Keene, New Hampshire, United States. The field, located on Arch Street, was constructed in 1948 and has served as the home of the Keene Swamp Bats of the New England Collegiate Baseball League since the 1997 NECBL season. The field is part of the athletic facilities at Keene High School and is owned by the Alumni Association. The football, soccer, and track & field teams of Keene High School also use the facility. It holds a capacity of approximately 4,100 fans.

Wilson Pond is located next to the field on the first base side. Alumni Field features three separate seating structures. The main, covered seating section is located on the first base side. On the third base side, a large, uncovered bleacher-style stand has 15 rows of seating. The third section is located behind home plate, a pair of smaller uncovered bleacher seating structures.

Alumni Field hosted the 2006 NECBL All-Star Game. The game, attended by 3,183 fans, was won by the visiting Northern Division 6–2.

== Swamp Bats attendance ==
The following is a list of Swamp Bats attendance figures at Alumni Field dating back to the 2001 season. The Swamp Bats have played at the facility since 1997, but attendance records date back only to 2001.

Season	Game Avg.	Season Total	Lge. Rk.
2001	1,550	31,009	2nd
2002	1,852	38,898	1st
2003	1,663	35,926	2nd
2004	1,870	39,286	1st
2005	1,779	37,362	1st
2006	1,693	33,861	3rd
2007	1,840	38,659	2nd
2008	1,760	36,975	2nd
2009	1,433	28,667	2nd
2010	1,547	32,496	2nd
2011	1,573	31,469	4th
2012	1,364	27,288	3rd
