= Joe Wolfe Field =

Baseball field in Massachusetts, US

- "The Joe"
- Interactive map of Joe Wolfe Field
- Location: State Street, North Adams, Massachusetts, US
- Coordinates: 42.693228°N 73.113°W
- Capacity: 1,800 (seated)
- Surface: Natural grass
- Scoreboard: Electronic
- Record attendance: 6,714 (July 4, 2006 SteepleCats vs. Holyoke Giants)
- Field size: 325 feet (LF); 358 feet (LCF); 385 feet (CF); 358 feet (RCF); 325 feet (RF)

Construction
- Built: 1986

Tenants
- North Adams SteepleCats (NECBL) (2002–present); MCLA Trailblazers baseball (NCAA DIII MASCAC) (2012); Drury High School and Charles H. McCann Technical High School baseball teams

Joe Wolfe Field is a baseball field in North Adams, Massachusetts, United States. The field is home to the North Adams SteepleCats of the New England Collegiate Baseball League, a collegiate summer baseball league based in New England. The park was built in 1986, with the SteepleCats first utilizing the facility at their inception in the 2002 NECBL season. It has a seated capacity of 1,800 spectators, with additional seating and standing areas located down either foul line. The dimensions of the field are 325 ft. down the lines, 358 ft. in the gaps, and 385 ft. in dead center field. The park faces south in the Noel Field Athletic Complex. The field is lighted for night play with 8 light poles.

In 2012, the Division III MCLA Trailblazers baseball team of the nearby Massachusetts College of Liberal Arts played three home games at Joe Wolfe Field. The facility is also used by the baseball teams of Drury High School and Charles H. McCann Technical High School, both located in North Adams. Joe Wolfe Field also hosts other youth sports leagues.

== History ==
Joe Wolfe Field was built in 1986 on the site of Noel Field. Noel had served as North Adams' main baseball venue for decades, but its grandstand and playing surface had become outdated. In building Joe Wolfe, a new grandstand and lighting structures were added, and the field itself was renovated.

Then-mayor of North Adams John Barrett III and local sports figure Joe Wolfe were key to fundraising for and building the park. When Wolfe died in November 1986, shortly after the field's construction, Barrett and others involved in the development decided to name the field after Joe Wolfe. In addition to his involvement in the field's construction, Wolfe played semi-professional baseball, coached youth teams, and worked in local sports organizations.

In 2005, the field was renovated. An electronic scoreboard and concession stand were added, and the backstop was improved.

6,714 fans attended a July 4, 2006, game against the Holyoke Giants, won by Holyoke 3–2. The attendance mark is an NECBL record for regular season, postseason, and All-Star games.

The field hosted the 2007 NECBL All-Star Game. The visiting South Division All-Stars won the game, which was attended by 4,210 fans.

== SteepleCats attendance ==
The following is a list of North Adams SteepleCats attendance figures at Joe Wolfe Field dating back to the team's inception in the 2002 season.

Season	Game Avg.	Season Total	Lge. Rk.
2002	908	19,087	4th
2003	874	17,496	5th
2004	1,355	28,457	4th
2005	1,249	26,230	5th
2006	1,095	22,995	6th
2007	1,096	23,031	5th
2008	1,124	26,624	4th
2009	1,025	20,511	6th
2010	688	14,441	6th
2011	969	19,386	6th
2012	824	17,311	5th
2013	913	18,264	5th
2014	731	14,629	5th
2015	805	16,902	5th
