= Mickey Gasper =

American baseball player (born 1995)

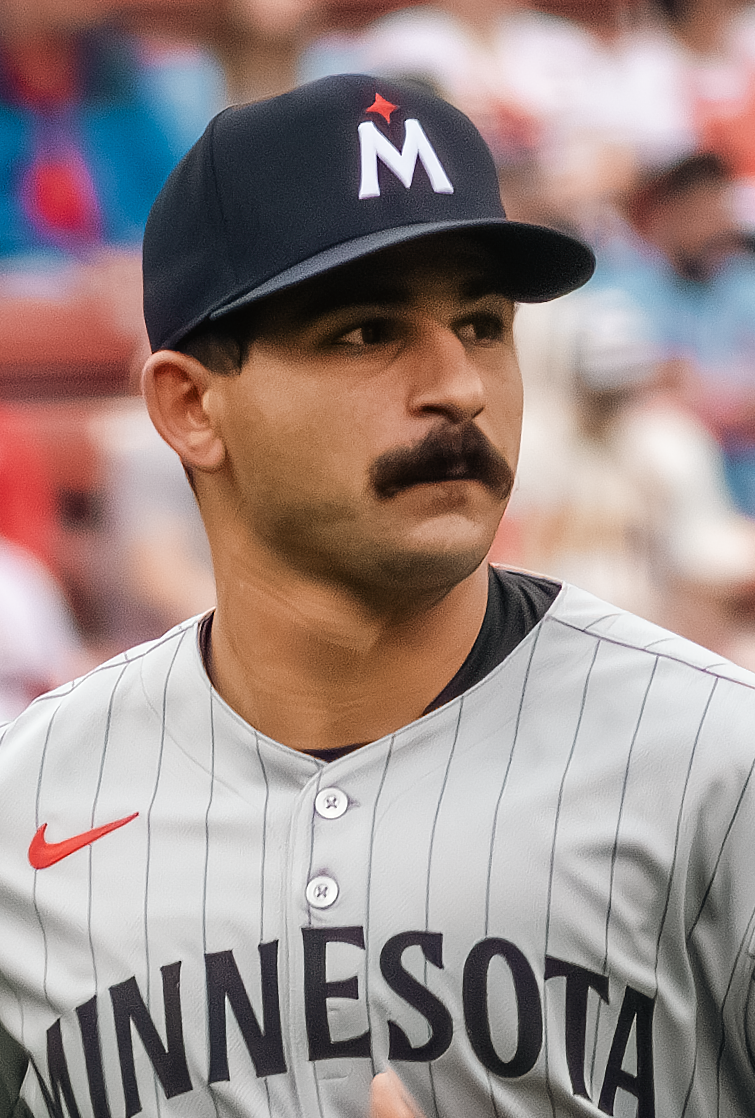
- Gasper with the Minnesota Twins in 2025

Boston Red Sox – No. 30
- Catcher / First baseman
- Born: October 11, 1995 (age 31); Highland Park, New Jersey, U.S.
- Bats: Switch Throws: Right

MLB debut
- August 12, 2024, for the Boston Red Sox

MLB statistics (through 2026 season)
- Batting average: .207
- Home runs: 12
- Runs batted in: 35
- Stats at Baseball Reference

Teams
- Boston Red Sox (2024); Minnesota Twins (2025); Boston Red Sox (2026–present)

Michael "Mickey" Gasper (born October 11, 1995) is an American professional baseball catcher and first baseman for the Boston Red Sox of Major League Baseball (MLB). He has previously played in MLB for the Minnesota Twins.

== Amateur career ==
Gasper was born in Highland Park, New Jersey, and his family relocated to New Hampshire in his childhood. He attended Merrimack High School in Merrimack, New Hampshire, where he played baseball and basketball, reaching the 2013 New Hampshire state finals in basketball as a senior for the 2013-14 season.

Gasper played college baseball at Bryant University from 2015 to 2018. In his four-year stint with the Bulldogs, he batted .344 with 17 home runs, 119 runs batted in (RBI), 127 runs scored, 102 walks, and 51 strikeouts. In 2016, Gasper played for the Nashua Silver Knights of the Futures Collegiate Baseball League. He was subsequently named the league MVP after setting Nashua single-season records in batting average (.421) and doubles (21), while also tallying nine home runs and 42 RBI. In 2017, he played collegiate summer baseball with the Brewster Whitecaps of the Cape Cod Baseball League and was named a league all-star.

== Professional career ==
=== New York Yankees ===
Gasper was drafted by the New York Yankees in the 27th round, with the 817th overall selection, of the 2018 Major League Baseball draft. He spent his first professional season with the rookie-level Pulaski Yankees, also appearing in one game for the Single-A Charleston RiverDogs. In 42 games with Pulaski, Gasper posted a .259/.395/.496 slash line with nine home runs and 30 RBI.

Gasper split 2019 between Charleston and the High-A Tampa Tarpons, slashing a cumulative .251/.357/.393 with 10 home runs and 53 RBI across 107 appearances. He did not play in a game in 2020 due to the cancellation of the minor league season because of the COVID-19 pandemic. In 2021, Gasper played for the rookie-level Florida Complex League Yankees, High-A Hudson Valley Renegades, and Double-A Somerset Patriots. Spanning 21 total games, he had a .318/.405/.515 slash line with two home runs, 11 RBI, and two stolen bases.

Gasper returned to Somerset in 2022, totaling 70 appearances and slashing .266/.407/.453 with eight home runs and 27 RBI. Gasper split the 2023 campaign between Somerset and the Triple-A Scranton/Wilkes-Barre RailRiders, slashing a combined .246/.361/.375 with seven home runs, 28 RBI, and 10 stolen bases over 74 contests.

=== Boston Red Sox ===
On December 6, 2023, the Boston Red Sox selected Gasper in the minor-league phase of the Rule 5 draft. He began the 2024 season with the Double-A Portland Sea Dogs, slashing .282/.403/.458 with four home runs and 22 RBI over 44 games. After Gasper was promoted to the Triple-A Worcester Red Sox in June, he slashed .402/.515/.664 with eight home runs and 32 RBI across 40 games.

On August 12, 2024, Gasper was selected to the 40-man roster and promoted to the major leagues for the first time. He made his major-league debut in a game at Fenway Park that evening, drawing a walk as a pinch hitter in his first plate appearance. In 13 games with Boston, Gasper went 0-for-18, though he drew four walks and was hit by a pitch.

=== Minnesota Twins ===
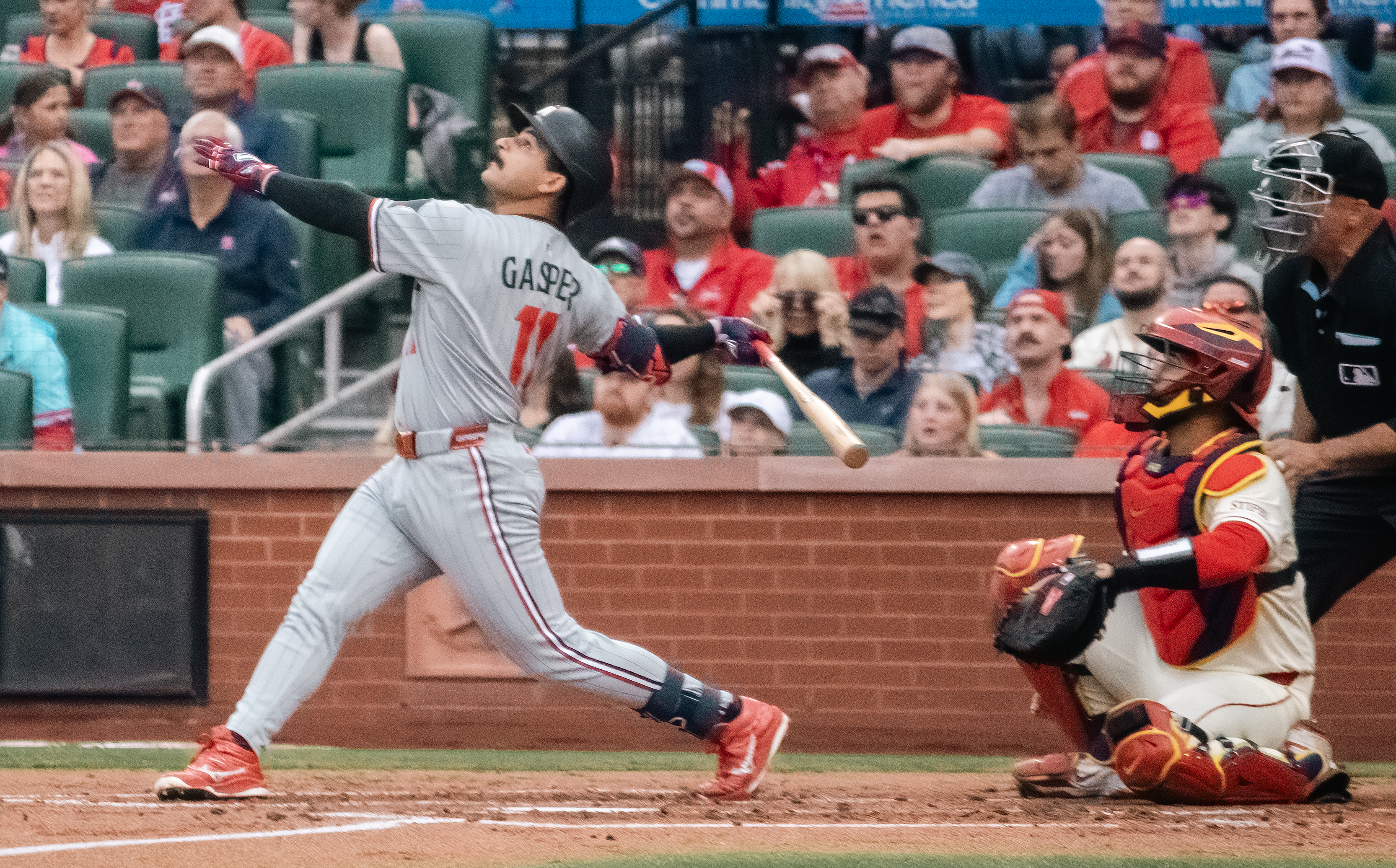
Gasper in St. Louis, 2025

On December 24, 2024, Boston traded Gasper to the Minnesota Twins in exchange for Jovani Morán. On March 29, 2025, Gasper recorded his first career hit, a single off of St. Louis Cardinals reliever JoJo Romero. On August 26, Gasper hit his first career home run off of Jeff Hoffman of the Toronto Blue Jays. In 45 appearances for Minnesota, he batted .158/.257/.232 with two home runs, 11 RBI, and two stolen bases. On January 14, 2026, Gasper was designated for assignment following Minnesota's waiver claim of Vidal Bruján.

=== Boston Red Sox (second stint) ===
On January 20, 2026, Gasper was claimed off waivers by the Washington Nationals. He was designated for assignment by Washington on January 29. On February 4, Gasper was claimed off waivers by the Boston Red Sox. He was optioned to the Triple-A Worcester Red Sox to begin the regular season. Gasper had a 1.671 on-base plus slugging in August, the fifth highest mark in any month in MLB history, with a minimum 30 plate appearances. During that stretch, the Red Sox optioned Gasper back to the minors but quickly recalled him following an injury to Willson Contreras.

== International career ==
Gasper was selected for the Italy national team at the 2026 World Baseball Classic from the quarterfinals onward after catcher Kyle Teel suffered a hamstring injury. However, Gasper did not play in the tournament, as J. J. D'Orazio started at catcher.

== Personal life ==
Gasper grew up in New Hampshire as a New York Yankees fan, a result of his parents hailing from New Jersey. He has a sister.

== See also ==
- Rule 5 draft results
