= Cardines Field =

Baseball stadium in Rhode Island, US

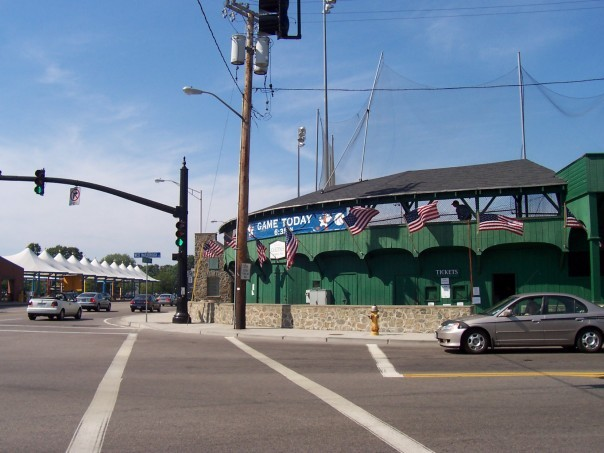
- Cardines undergoing pregame preparation on a Gulls game night.
- Interactive map of Cardines Field
- Former names: Basin Field
- Location: 20 America's Cup Avenue, Newport, Rhode Island, USA
- Coordinates: 41.491006°N 71.316861°W
- Owner: City of Newport, RI
- Capacity: 3,000
- Surface: Grass
- Scoreboard: Electric
- Field size: Left field: 315 ft Left-center: 365 ft Center field: 395 ft Center field indent: 315 ft Right-center field corner: 340 ft Right field: 285 ft Fences: 28 ft

Construction
- Groundbreaking: 1908
- Renovated: 1938, 2000

Tenants
- Newport Gulls (NECBL) (2001–present); Salve Regina Seahawks (CCC)

Cardines Field is a baseball stadium located at 20 America’s Cup Avenue in Newport, Rhode Island. It is believed to be one of the oldest ballparks in the United States and has been called "a small urban gem of a ballpark". The field serves as a buffer between the residential and commercial sections of an older part of Newport. The oddly shaped outfield fence and dimensions are created by the close proximity of residential housing, while the spectator side of the park is contained by America's Cup Avenue and West Marlborough Street. Originally called Basin Field, references to the field can be found as early as 1893. At that time, the property was used by local railroads as a drainage and supply basin for steam engines. Complaints from neighbors about the stagnant water and mosquitoes prompted the drainage of the basin area, permitting baseball to be played. A local historical debate continues as to whether baseball was played prior to 1900, making Cardines one of the oldest existing ballparks in the country, or if play didn't begin until 1908, the earliest documented proof of stadium construction.

The Basin Field ballpark was later renamed for Bernardo Cardines, a Newport baseball player who was Newport's first citizen to die in World War I. Today, the ballpark continues to be the home of the historic Sunset League, as well as the Newport Gulls of the New England Collegiate Baseball League.

== History ==
Built for unofficial sandlot baseball games by railroad workers from the adjacent Old Colony Division of the New York, New Haven and Hartford Railroad Line, the field hosted many barnstorming all-stars, including Negro league teams like the Baltimore Elite Giants, Boston Royal Giants and the New York Black Yankees. Satchel Paige once played at Cardines. The original backstop dates back to as early as 1908, when the city organized its first six-team league at the park.

Cardines Field is a smaller cousin of other notable ballparks of that era, such as Ebbets Field, Fenway Park and Wrigley Field, with a stone facade and wooden bleachers with unique outfield angles. The exterior's elliptical arches reflect the facade of the original Yankee Stadium.

In 1936, the city of Newport took over ownership. Stone and concrete bleachers were built along the third-base line by the Works Progress Administration (WPA) in 1936-1937. The plaque at the entrance that reads "1937" refers to this date. The current grandstand was built by the WPA following the devastating hurricane of 1938. The distinctive curving grandstand section behind home plate was built in 1939. Over the coming decades, the park continued to grow through construction projects to increase capacity, eventually creating the patchwork, overlapping stadium seen today.

During World War II, many former professional ball players were stationed at Naval Station Newport. Many of these players, including Yogi Berra, Phil Rizzuto, and Bob Feller participated in Newport's George Donnelly Sunset League, an amateur league formed in 1919. Wednesday night all-star games drew thousands and required construction of temporary bleachers in the outfield. The Sunset League was named because games began at 5:30 p.m. and ended at dusk, prior to the addition of lights at the park. It is the oldest continuous amateur baseball league in the country. With black players such as Larry Doby and Luke Easter, the Sunset League was integrated several years before Jackie Robinson joined the Brooklyn Dodgers in 1947. The league continues today as key chapter of Cardines' history.

== Current tenants ==
The Sunset League still plays a full schedule throughout the summer, though the park's lighting system now permits games to go well beyond dusk. The field is home to baseball games for Rogers High School, Newport's Babe Ruth League, the historic Sunset League, Newport's American Legion team, Salve Regina University, Naval Academy Preparatory School and the Newport Gulls of the New England Collegiate Baseball League. In the January 18, 2004 edition of Baseball America, Cardines Field was chosen as one of the top five locations in America to play college summer baseball, in response to the jump in reputation the Gulls brought to the park.

== Newport Gulls era ==
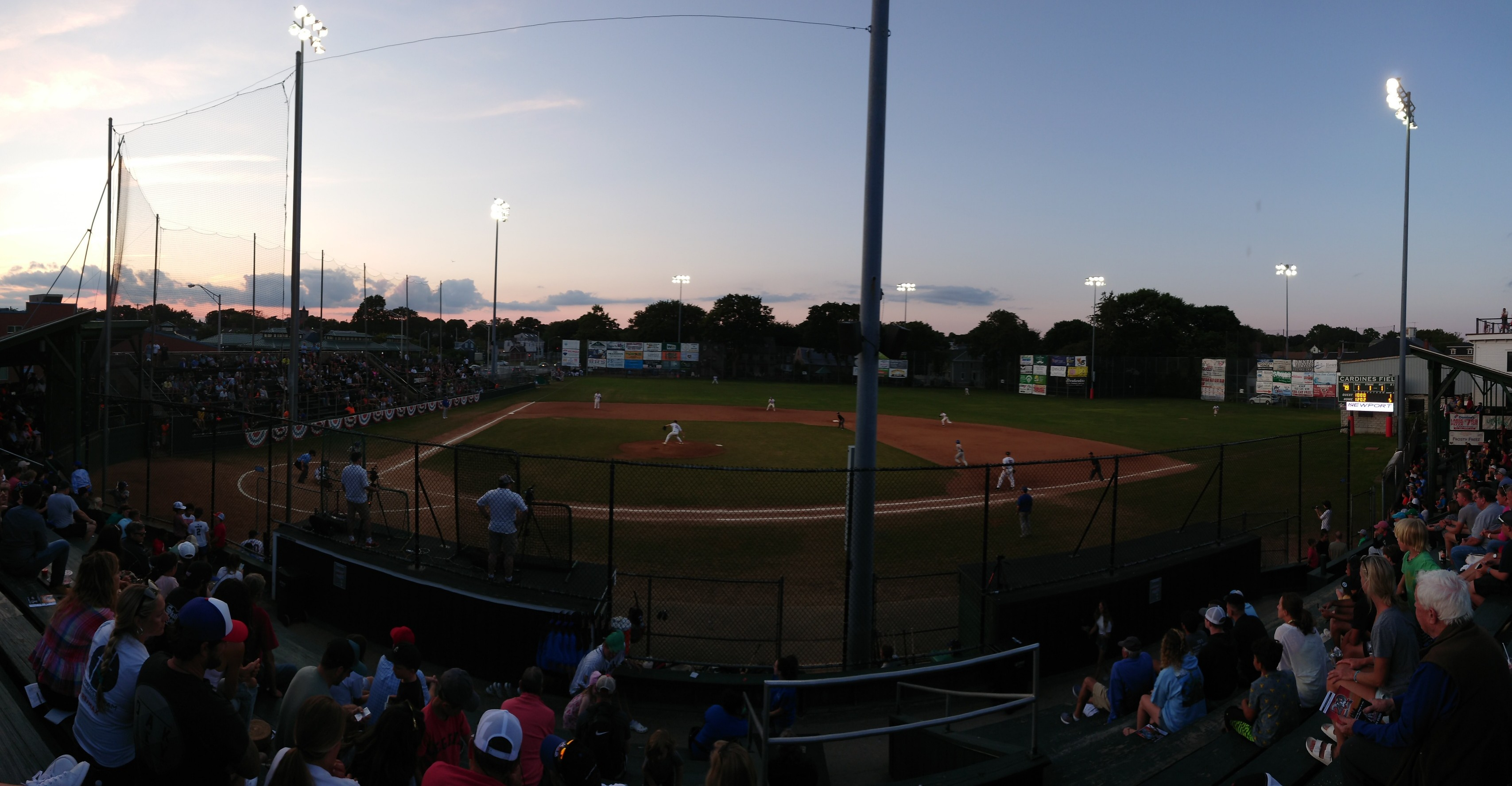
Newport Gulls playing the Bristol Blues during a NECBL game.

While most teams playing at Cardines average attendance in the dozens or, at most, a few hundred per game, the Newport Gulls, since moving to Newport in 2001, have helped to bring the field back to its former glory days of the mid-20th century, attracting hundreds of fans every night. During the 2004 regular and playoff seasons alone, the Gulls attracted over 50,000 fans through just 26 home games, often with sellout crowds. Following the 2010 season, the Gulls set a team and NECBL record for regular season home attendance, totaling 45,683 after 21 games.

== Renovations ==
Renovation work began in 2000 with funds from a matching $500,000 grant from the state Department of Environmental Management and the formation of the Friends of Cardines Field Foundation. In recent years, the grandstands, concession operation, and bathrooms have been renovated as part of the project, along with the addition of a state-of-the-art field lighting system. The winter of 2005 - 2006 saw the entire outfield and infield replaced among other improvements, including the addition of a fully functional drainage system and new outfield fence, all at the cost of an additional half million dollars.

The Newport Gulls also have necessitated the expansion of concession equipment, in addition to the renovation of a team office, storage rooms, souvenir stand, ticket booth, scoreboard, and public address system, much of which has been covered by the ongoing restoration project led by the city's Parks and Recreation Department, the Gulls former ownership, and Roger Williams University Professor Jeffery Staats. The most recent improvements have been to upgrade the stadium's broadcasting abilities, with the addition of high speed Internet and phone lines, camera positions, and a control room below the pressbox for use by the Tigers TV Crew, the volunteer production crew who work with the Gulls to produce games.

The park today has changed drastically in upkeep and appearance from that of the recent past. As early as a decade ago, some in the city of Newport had proposed for a then dilapidated Cardines Field to be demolished in order to expand parking in the cramped downtown area, a mere block in each direction from the waterfront to the West, commercial and tourist center to the South, and world-famous historical district to the East.

Future projects at Cardines include: concluding outfield fence replacement via a state grant, widening and lengthening of the hockey-style side-by-side dugouts, the additions of a locker room and an umpire's room, and further restoration of bleachers, framework, trim, and other facets. The removal of a large, rundown private warehouse which makes up the right field foul line has been discussed for some time, though no official plans have been announced.
