= Martha's Vineyard Sharks =

American collegiate baseball team

Logo
Cap insignia

Information
- League: NECBL (South Division)
- Location: Oak Bluffs, Massachusetts
- Ballpark: The Shark Tank
- Founded: 2010
- League championships: 2013; 2018; 2022
- Division championships: 2019; 2021
- Former league: FCBL (2010–2018)
- Colors: Purple, White
- Mascot: Sharky
- Ownership: John Roberts
- Management: Kayleigh Bollin Asst. GM
- President: Russ Curran
- General manager: Russ Curran
- Manager: Payton Fuller
- Website: mvsharks.com

The Martha's Vineyard Sharks is a collegiate summer baseball team based on Martha's Vineyard in Massachusetts. It was a charter member of the Futures Collegiate Baseball League (FCBL), a wood-bat league comprising seven teams from New Hampshire to western Connecticut. The Sharks played in the FCBL from 2010 to 2018 before switching to the New England Collegiate Baseball League (NECBL), where they began playing in 2019. In 2019 the Sharks posted the best regular-season record in the league and won a best-of-three series against the Newport Gulls to win the Southern Division, but ultimately lost 2–0 in the NECBL Championship to the Keene Swamp Bats. The team's mascot is likely a reference to the film Jaws, which was filmed on Martha's Vineyard and made it a popular tourist destination.

The team's home games are played at Vineyard Baseball Park, located on the Martha's Vineyard Regional High School campus in Oak Bluffs, Massachusetts, where $200,000 has been invested in field upgrades and construction of a field house, public restrooms, and a pro-style backstop with netting and brick facade.

== History ==
The Sharks began operations in the 2011 FCBL season. The Carminucci Sports Group sought to place a New England Collegiate Baseball League (NECBL) franchise on Martha's Vineyard, but the NECBL declined to expand, so the Sharks and the organizers of the Nashua Silver Knights formed a separate league. Opening Day attendance was 2,139. The Sharks were in first place for a majority of the season, before injuries and a team-wide viral illness caused them to fall behind. They completed the season in third place, with a record of 23–20. The Sharks won their first FCBL Championship in 2013 and shared the title in 2018.

The Sharks moved to the NECBL in 2019 and posted the league's best regular-season record in their first season, including a 12-game win streak. In the postseason, the Sharks won a best-of-three series over the Newport Gulls, before ultimately losing two straight games to the Keene Swamp Bats in the league championship series. The Sharks broke a single-game attendance record with 3,567 fans in attendance on the last regular-season home game of the season. In 2022, they went 5–0 in the playoffs to win their first NECBL league championship, and also hosted the 2022 all-star game with attendance exceeding 5,000 fans. For the 2024 season, the Sharks ranked first in the NECBL and ninth in all of summer collegiate baseball with an average attendance of 3,056 per game. In 2025, the Sharks advanced to the NECBL finals by winning the South Division, beating Newport 2-1 in a best-of-3 series, but lost 2-0 to Keene. The Sharks attendance reached 72,453 including playoffs to lead the league for the third straight year.

== Field staff ==
Head Coach
Sean Stevens

Assistant Coaches
