= New England Collegiate Baseball League =

U.S. collegiate summer baseball league

- Current season, competition or edition: 2026 NECBL season
- Sport: Baseball
- Founded: 1993
- Motto: Keep your eye on the dream
- No. of teams: 13
- Country: United States
- Most recent champion: Sanford Mainers (2026) (3)
- Most titles: Newport Gulls (8)
- Website: www.necbl.com

The New England Collegiate Baseball League (NECBL or New England League) is a 13-team collegiate summer baseball wooden bat league founded in 1993 and sanctioned by the NCAA and Major League Baseball. Each NECBL team plays an eight-week, 44-game schedule during June and July, with a playoff in early August. Like the Cape Cod Baseball League and other amateur leagues, the NECBL is a showcase for top college-level players, giving professional baseball scouts a chance to see prospective pros playing against each other. Along with the Cape Cod Baseball League, Northwoods League, and Coastal Plain League, it is considered one of the top summer leagues in the country and is a part of the National Alliance of College Summer Baseball. In 2019, the Collegiate Summer Baseball Register ranked the NECBL as the 2nd best collegiate summer baseball league, behind only the Cape Cod League.

Founded in 1993, the NECBL began its direction under George Foster, former Cincinnati Reds and New York Mets All-Star and Major League Baseball home run leader, and Emmy Award-winning television producer/director Joseph Consentino. Play started in 1994 and today the NECBL plays in all six New England states. It recruits players attending U.S. colleges from New England, the other 44 states, and foreign countries, provided that they come from NCAA-sanctioned colleges or universities, are in good academic standing, have completed at least one year of athletic eligibility, and have at least one year of eligibility remaining.

The NECBL's current commissioner is Sean McGrath, former general manager of the North Adams SteepleCats. McGrath replaced Mario Tiani, who retired following the 2012 season.

== League structure ==
The NECBL became a 13-team league in 2013 with the addition of teams in Rhode Island (Ocean State Waves), Massachusetts (Plymouth Pilgrims) and New York (Saratoga Brigade) (the league's first team to operate outside New England), but reverted to 12 teams after the Brigade folded. On October 30, 2015, the league announced that the Upper Valley Nighthawks would begin play in 2016 in Hartford, Vermont, bringing the league back to 13 teams. The Plymouth Pilgrims ceased operations after the 2018 season but were replaced by the Martha's Vineyard Sharks, a former member of the Futures Collegiate Baseball League (FCBL). The New Bedford BaySox ceased after the 2019 season, replaced by the Bristol Blues, who also moved from the FCBL. The North Shore Navigators returned to the league in 2021 after nine years in the FCBL. The Winnipesaukee Muskrats folded following the 2022 season after the league's governing board rejected the team's strategy to house players.

== Teams ==
=== Current teams ===
North Division, South Division

New England Collegiate Baseball League
Division	Team	Founded	City	Stadium	Capacity
North	Keene Swamp Bats	1997	Keene, New Hampshire	Alumni Field	4,100
North	North Adams SteepleCats	2002	North Adams, Massachusetts	Joe Wolfe Field	1,800
North	North Shore Navigators	2008 (Note: The Navigators played in the FCBL from 2012–2020.)	Lynn, Massachusetts	Fraser Field	3,804
North	Sanford Mainers	2002	Sanford, Maine	Goodall Park	950
North	Upper Valley Nighthawks	2016	Hartford, Vermont	Maxfield Sports Complex	1,500
North	Vermont Mountaineers	2003	Montpelier, Vermont	Montpelier Recreation Field	1,200
South	Bristol Blues	2015 (Note: The Blues played in the FCBL from 2015–2019.)	Bristol, Connecticut	Muzzy Field	4,900
South	Danbury Westerners	1995	Danbury, Connecticut	Rogers Park	^2,500
South	Martha's Vineyard Sharks	2010 (Note: The Sharks played in the FCBL from 2010–2018.)	Oak Bluffs, Massachusetts	The Shark Tank	^2,000
South	Mystic Schooners (Note: The Schooners are the only surviving charter franchise.)	1994	Groton, Connecticut	Fitch High School	>1,000
South	Newport Gulls	1998	Newport, Rhode Island	Cardines Field	3,000
South	Ocean State Waves	2013	South Kingstown, Rhode Island	Old Mountain Field	^2,000
South	Valley Blue Sox	2001	Holyoke, Massachusetts	Mackenzie Stadium	4,100

- A caret (^) denotes an approximate capacity, including lawn seating.

=== Relocated or renamed teams ===
Team	City	Stadium	Capacity	Years	History
Waterbury White Sox	Waterbury, Connecticut	Municipal Stadium	6,000	1994	Became the Waterbury Barons
Eastern Tides	Willimantic, Connecticut	Eastern Baseball Stadium	1,500	1994–2001	Became the Thread City Tides
Thread City Tides	Willimantic, Connecticut	Eastern Baseball Stadium	1,500	2002–2003	Became the Berkshire Dukes
Berkshire Dukes	Hinsdale, Massachusetts	Dan Duquette Sports Academy		2004	Became the Pittsfield Dukes
Pittsfield Dukes	Pittsfield, Massachusetts	Wahconah Park	4,500	2005–2008	Became the Pittsfield American Defenders
Pittsfield American Defenders	Pittsfield, Massachusetts	Wahconah Park	4,500	2009	Became the Bristol Collegiate Baseball Club
Bristol Collegiate Baseball Club	Bristol, Connecticut	Muzzy Field	4,900	2010	Became the Mystic Schooners
Middletown Giants	Middletown, Connecticut	Palmer Field	3,500	1994–2003	Became the Holyoke Giants
Holyoke Giants	Holyoke, Massachusetts	Mackenzie Stadium	4,100	2004–2007	Became the North Shore Navigators
Rhode Island Reds	West Warwick, Rhode Island	McCarthy Field	2,500	1996–2000	Became the Riverpoint Royals
Torrington Twisters	Torrington, Connecticut	Fuessenich Park	1,500	1997–2008	Became the New Bedford Bay Sox
Rhode Island Gulls	Cranston, Rhode Island	Cranston Stadium	4,500	1998–2000	Became the Newport Gulls.
Mill City All-Americans	Lowell, Massachusetts	Stoklosa Alumni Field	4,000	2000–2006	Renamed the Lowell All-Americans
Lowell All-Americans	Lowell, Massachusetts	Stoklosa Alumni Field	4,000	2007–2010	Became the Old Orchard Beach Raging Tide
Manchester Silkworms	Manchester, Connecticut	Northwest Park		2000–2009	Became the Laconia Muskrats
Laconia Muskrats	Laconia, New Hampshire	Robbie Mills Field	1,200	2010-2015	Became the Winnipesaukee Muskrats
Concord Quarry Dogs	Concord, New Hampshire	Warren H. Doane Diamond	1,200	2001–2007	Became the Holyoke Blue Sox, now the Valley Blue Sox

=== Defunct teams ===
Team	City	Stadium	Capacity	Years
Fairfield Stallions	Fairfield, Connecticut	Alumni Baseball Diamond	1,000	1994
Bristol Nighthawks	Bristol, Connecticut	Muzzy Field	4,900	1994–1995
Waterbury Barons	Waterbury, Connecticut	Municipal Stadium	6,000	1994–1996
Central Mass Collegians	Leominster, Massachusetts	Doyle Field	6,200	1995–1999
Riverpoint Royals	West Warwick, Rhode Island	McCarthy Field	2,500	1996–2004
Old Orchard Beach Raging Tide	Old Orchard Beach, Maine	The Ball Park	6,000	2000–2011
Saratoga Brigade	Saratoga Springs, New York	East Side Recreation		2013
Plymouth Pilgrims	Plymouth, Massachusetts	Forges Field		2013-2018
New Bedford Bay Sox	New Bedford, Massachusetts	Paul Walsh Field		1997–2019
Winnipesaukee Muskrats	Laconia, New Hampshire	Robbie Mills Field	1,200	2010-2022

== Season structure ==
In the 2021 season, the league was divided into two seven-team divisions, the North Division and the South Division. During the regular season, teams played 44 regular-season games, solely against division opponents, because of COVID-19 travel concerns. Scheduled doubleheaders were seven-inning games.

The top four teams from each division qualified for the eight-team playoff bracket, in which teams played best-of-three series to determine the champion.

For 2022, the NECBL went to three divisions, with a single pair of games against each out-of-division team. The league retained the three-division format through the 2024 season. In 2025, the NECBL returned to the two-division format with six teams in the North Division and seven in the South.

In 2026, the playoffs included the two division-winners, now followed by the six other teams with the best win-loss percentage regardless of division. That year, the six comprised one Northern Division team and five Southern Division teams.

== Past champions ==
Total NECBL Fay Vincent Cup Records
Franchise	Titles	Last title	Appearances
Newport Gulls	8	2024	13
Keene Swamp Bats	6	2025	8
North Shore Navigators	4	2010	4
Middletown Giants	3	1999	3
Sanford Mainers	3	2026	5
Vermont Mountaineers	3	2015	6
Central Mass Collegians	2	1996	2
Mystic Schooners	2	2016	3
Valley Blue Sox	2	2018	2
Danbury Westerners	1	2021	6
Martha's Vineyard Sharks	1	2022	3
New Bedford Bay Sox	0		4
Ocean State Waves	0		2
Bristol Nighthawks	0		1
Winnipesaukee Muskrats	0		1
Waterbury Barons	0		1
Riverpoint Royals	0		0
Fairfield Stallions	0		0
North Adams SteepleCats	0		0
Plymouth Pilgrims	0		0
Saratoga Brigade	0		0
Old Orchard Beach Raging Tide	0		0
Upper Valley Nighthawks	0		0

In the NECBL's history, the most successful team is the Newport Gulls, with eight league championships and thirteen championship series appearances (including one championship appearance as the Cranston, Rhode Island–based Rhode Island Gulls). The Keene Swamp Bats are next with six league titles, and the North Shore Navigators have four.

Year	Winning team	Series	Losing team
1994	Eastern Tides	3–2	Bristol Nighthawks
1995	Central Mass Collegians	2–0	Waterbury Barons
1996	Central Mass Collegians	2–1	Danbury Westerners
1997	Middletown Giants	2–1	Torrington Twisters
1998	Middletown Giants	3–1	Torrington Twisters
1999	Middletown Giants	3–1	Danbury Westerners
2000	Keene Swamp Bats	2–1	Rhode Island Gulls
2001	Newport Gulls	2–1	Keene Swamp Bats
2002	Newport Gulls	2–0	Keene Swamp Bats
2003	Keene Swamp Bats	2–0	Torrington Twisters
2004	Sanford Mainers	2–1	Newport Gulls
2005	Newport Gulls	2–0	Vermont Mountaineers
2006	Vermont Mountaineers	2–0	Torrington Twisters
2007	Vermont Mountaineers	2–0	Newport Gulls
2008	Sanford Mainers	2–0	Newport Gulls
2009	Newport Gulls	2–1	Vermont Mountaineers
2010	North Shore Navigators	2–1	Danbury Westerners
2011	Keene Swamp Bats	2–0	Laconia Muskrats
2012	Newport Gulls	2–0	Danbury Westerners
2013	Keene Swamp Bats	2–1	Newport Gulls
2014	Newport Gulls	2–0	Sanford Mainers
2015	Vermont Mountaineers	2-1	Mystic Schooners
2016	Mystic Schooners	2-0	Sanford Mainers
2017	Valley Blue Sox	2-0	Ocean State Waves
2018	Valley Blue Sox	2-0	Ocean State Waves
2019	Keene Swamp Bats	2-0	Martha's Vineyard Sharks
2020	None (season cancelled due to COVID-19 pandemic)		
2021	Danbury Westerners	2-0	North Shore Navigators
2022	Martha's Vineyard Sharks	2-0	Vermont Mountaineers
2023	Newport Gulls	2-0	Bristol Blues
2024	Newport Gulls	2-1	Sanford Mainers
2025	Keene Swamp Bats	2-0	Martha's Vineyard Sharks
2026	Sanford Mainers	2-1	Danbury Westerners

== All-Star Game ==
The All-Star Game usually takes place from mid- to late July. Prior to the game a Home Run Derby is held and, since the 2007 All-Star Game, a Special Skill Competition for Most Accurate Arm and Fastest Runner.

Year	Winning team	Score	Venue	Host team	Attendance	MVP
1994	Bristol Nighthawks	6-0	Muzzy Field	Bristol Nighthawks		
1995						Matt Zawalich, Waterbury Barons
1996						Dana Forsberg, Central Mass Collegians
1997						Keith Surkont, Rhode Island Reds
1998			Fuessenich Park	Torrington Twisters		Clarke Caudill, Middletown Giants
1999						Mark Malaska, Danbury Westerners
2000			Alumni Field	Keene Swamp Bats		Jon Watterson, Keene Swamp Bats; Cy Hess, Eastern Tides
2001	National Division	9-4	Northwest Park	Manchester Silkworms	776	Joe Apotheke, Danbury Westerners
2002	National Division	4-3	Eastern Baseball Stadium	Thread City Tides	1,000	Rocky Baker, Keene Swamp Bats
2003	Northern Division	6-0	Warren H. Doane Diamond at Memorial Field	Concord Quarry Dogs	1,326	Josh DiScipio, Concord Quarry Dogs
2004	Southern Division	7-4	Montpelier Recreation Field	Vermont Mountaineers	4,127	P.J. Antoniato, Manchester Silkworms
2005	Southern Division	7-2	Cardines Field	Newport Gulls	2,856	Chris Cates, North Adams SteepleCats
2006	Northern Division	6-2	Alumni Field	Keene Swamp Bats	3,183	Cheyne Hurst, Keene Swamp Bats
2007	Southern Division	8-0	Joe Wolfe Field	North Adams SteepleCats	4,210	Ozzie Borrell, North Adams SteepleCats
2008	Southern Division	5-2	Fuessenich Park	Torrington Twisters	2,314	Mike Melillo, Newport Gulls
2009	West Division	6-5	Mackenzie Stadium	Holyoke Blue Sox	4,906	Jake Rosenbeck, Holyoke Blue Sox
2010	East Division	12-0	Cardines Field	Newport Gulls	2,852	Jason Banos, North Shore Navigators
2011	East Division	3-1	Fraser Field	North Shore Navigators	2,112	Jack Reinheimer, Newport Gulls
2012	West Division	11-6	Montpelier Recreation Field	Vermont Mountaineers	2,106	Johnny Mishu, Vermont Mountaineers
2013	East Division	2-1	Robbie Mills Field	Laconia Muskrats	1,012	Joe Torres, Laconia Muskrats
2014	North All-Stars	4-3	Mackenzie Stadium	Holyoke Blue Sox	2671	Jared Mederos, Keene Swamp Bats
2015	N/A (game cancelled due to rain)	N/A	Goodall Park	Sanford Mariners	N/A	N/A
2016	Tie	8-8	Cardines Field	Newport Gulls	3116	Jordan Howard (Keene Swamp Bats) and Darrien Ragains (New Bedford Bay Sox)
2017	Tie	5-5	Joe Wolfe Field	North Adams Steeple Cats	2316	Colby Maiola, Sanford Mainers
2018	South All-Stars	4-3	MacKenzie Stadium	Holyoke Blue Sox		Randy Taveras, Danbury Westerners
2019	N/A (rained out mid game)	1-0	Montpelier Recreation Field	Vermont Mountaineers		N/A
2020	Season cancelled due to COVID-19 pandemic					
2021	Northern Division	6-2	Cardines Field	Newport Gulls		Max Viera, Upper Valley Nighthawks
2022	Southern Division	13-2	Vineyard Baseball Park	Martha's Vineyard Sharks	5469	Thomas Bramley, Martha's Vineyard Sharks
2023	West Division	5-1	Fraser Field	North Shore Navigators	3951	Kevin Bruggeman, Upper Valley Nighthawks
2024	East Division	3-0	Muzzy Field	Bristol Blues	2206	Colin Barczi, Sanford Mainers
2025	Northern Division	3-1	Maxfield Sports Complex	Upper Valley Nighthawks	1,745	Jack Herring, Keene Swamp Bats
2026	Northern Division	5-0	Goodall Park	Sanford Mariners	1,134	Alex Benevento, Vermont Mountaineers

=== Home Run Derby winners ===
Year	Winner	Team
1997	Steven Wright	Torrington Twisters
1998	Gil Barkman	Keene Swamp Bats
1999	Jeff Keppinger	Keene Swamp Bats
2000	Val Majewski	Eastern Tides
2001	Mike Bohlander	Newport Gulls
2002	Mike Wagner	North Adams SteepleCats
2003	Kyle Keen	Keene Swamp Bats
2004	Doug Hehner	Manchester Silkworms
2005	John Fitzpatrick	Manchester Silkworms
2006	Matt Sutton	Concord Quarry Dogs
2007	Kyle Bellows	Holyoke Giants
2008	Michael Olt	Danbury Westerners
2009	Jacob Rogers	Keene Swamp Bats
2010	Ben Klafczynski	Keene Swamp Bats
2011	N/A	N/A
2012	Danny Collins	Winnipesaukee Muskrats
2013	Nate LaPointe	Sanford Mainers
2014	Blaise Salter	Newport Gulls
2015	Tim Lynch	Ocean State Waves
2016	Gabe Snyder	Newport Gulls
2017	Robert Boselli III	Keene Swamp Bats
2018	Lorenzo Hampton	Keene Swamp Bats
2019	Terry Bowen	Mystic Schooners
2020	N/A	Canceled due to COVID-19 pandemic
2021	Luke Franzoni	Valley Blue Sox
2022	Ryan Ignoffo	Upper Valley Nighthawks
2023	Anthony Steele	Danbury Westerners
2024	Jakobi Davis	Danbury Westerners
2025	Glenn Green	Danbury Westerners
2026	Rex Hauser	Vermont Mountaineers

== Notable alumni ==
The following former NECBL players have gone on to play in Major League Baseball. Former NECBL players have reached the major league rosters of all thirty MLB teams, the thirtieth team being the Philadelphia Phillies when, in September 2015, Brian Bogusevic debuted with the team.

Major League Baseball alumni of the New England Collegiate Baseball League
(past and present)
Name	Position	NECBL Team	MLB Debut Team	MLB Debut Year
Joe Nathan	P	Fairfield Stallions	San Francisco Giants	1999
Chad Paronto	P	Middletown Giants	Cleveland Indians	2000
Scott Chiasson	P	Eastern Tides	Chicago Cubs	2000
Alfredo Amézaga	SS	Keene Swamp Bats	Pittsburgh Pirates	2002
Earl Snyder	1B/OF	Danbury Westerners/Middletown Giants	Cleveland Indians	2002
Mike Smith	P	Middletown Giants	Toronto Blue Jays	2002
Mark Malaska	P/OF	Danbury Westerners	Tampa Bay Devil Rays	2003
Matt White	P	Danbury Westerners	Boston Red Sox	2003
Pete Zoccolillo	OF	Danbury Westerners	Milwaukee Brewers	2003
Jason Szuminski	P	Newport Gulls	San Diego Padres	2004
Jeff Keppinger	2B	Keene Swamp Bats	New York Mets	2004
Val Majewski	OF	Eastern Tides	Baltimore Orioles	2004
Craig Breslow	P	Middletown Giants	San Diego Padres	2005
Keith Reed	OF	Rhode Island Reds	Baltimore Orioles	2005
Tim Stauffer	P	Keene Swamp Bats	San Diego Padres	2005
Jason Bergmann	P	Danbury Westerners	Washington Nationals	2005
Chris Denorfia	OF	Manchester Silkworms	Cincinnati Reds	2005
Charlton Jimerson	CF	Torrington Twisters	Houston Astros	2005
Doug Clark	LF	Middletown Giants	San Francisco Giants	2005
Andre Ethier	OF	Keene Swamp Bats	Los Angeles Dodgers	2006
Kurt Birkins	P	Torrington Twisters	Baltimore Orioles	2006
Sean Green	P	Torrington Twisters	Seattle Mariners	2006
Zach Jackson	P	Manchester Silkworms	Milwaukee Brewers	2006
Jeff Fulchino	P	Keene Swamp Bats	Florida Marlins	2006
Chris Iannetta	C	Newport Gulls	Colorado Rockies	2006
Brian Wilson	P	Keene Swamp Bats	San Francisco Giants	2006
Jonah Bayliss	P	Manchester Silkworms	Pittsburgh Pirates	2006
Brian Slocum	P	Danbury Westerners	Cleveland Indians	2006
Rajai Davis	CF	Middletown Giants	Pittsburgh Pirates	2006
Mike Rabelo	C	Torrington Twisters	Detroit Tigers	2006
Joe Smith	P	North Adams SteepleCats	New York Mets	2007
Andy LaRoche	IF	Keene Swamp Bats	Los Angeles Dodgers	2007
Matt DeSalvo	P	Danbury Westerners	New York Yankees	2007
Kevin Slowey	P	Sanford Mainers	Minnesota Twins	2007
Andy Sonnanstine	P	Sanford Mainers	Tampa Bay Devil Rays	2007
Matt Tupman	C	Concord Quarry Dogs/Mill City All-Americans	Kansas City Royals	2008
Matt Joyce	OF	Danbury Westerners	Detroit Tigers	2008
Bobby Wilson	C	North Adams SteepleCats	Los Angeles Angels	2008
Chris Lambert	P	Concord Quarry Dogs	Detroit Tigers	2008
Mike Ekstrom	P	North Adams SteepleCats	San Diego Padres	2008
Luke Carlin	C	Keene Swamp Bats	Arizona Diamondbacks	2008
Jesse Carlson	P	Middletown Giants	Toronto Blue Jays	2008
Bryan LaHair	1B	Keene Swamp Bats	Seattle Mariners	2008
Jason Motte	P	Sanford Mainers	St. Louis Cardinals	2008
Mike Parisi	P	Middletown Giants/ Torrington Twisters	St. Louis Cardinals	2008
Mitchell Boggs	P	Newport Gulls	St. Louis Cardinals	2008
Jeff Baisley	3B	Danbury Westerners	Oakland Athletics	2008
Bobby Korecky	P	Torrington Twisters	Minnesota Twins	2008
Ryan Hanigan	C	Lowell All-Americans	Cincinnati Reds	2008
Joe Martinez	P	Danbury Westerners	San Francisco Giants	2009
Andrew Bailey	P	Lowell All-Americans	Oakland Athletics	2009
Jack Egbert	P	Danbury Westerners	Chicago White Sox	2009
Jarrett Hoffpauir	2B	Danbury Westerners	St. Louis Cardinals	2009
Reid Gorecki	RF	Manchester Silkworms	Atlanta Braves	2009
Jason Berken	P	Keene Swamp Bats	Baltimore Orioles	2009
Dusty Hughes	P	Danbury Westerners	Kansas City Royals	2009
Brian Bogusevic	P	Danbury Westerners	Houston Astros	2010
Rob Delaney	P	Pittsfield Dukes/ Vermont Mountaineers	Minnesota Twins	2010
Jeff Frazier	OF	Danbury Westerners	Tampa Bay Rays	2010
Cole Gillespie	OF	North Adams SteepleCats	Arizona Diamondbacks	2010
Frank Herrmann	P	Berkshire Dukes	Cleveland Indians	2010
Adam Ottavino	P	Danbury Westerners	St. Louis Cardinals	2010
Stephen Strasburg	P	Torrington Twisters	Washington Nationals	2010
David Carpenter	P	Vermont Mountaineers	Houston Astros	2011
Blake Davis	SS	North Adams SteepleCats	Baltimore Orioles	2011
Graham Godfrey	P	Manchester Silkworms	Oakland Athletics	2011
Ryan Lavarnway	C	Manchester Silkworms	Boston Red Sox	2011
Steve Lombardozzi Jr.	2B	Holyoke Blue Sox	Washington Nationals	2011
Darin Mastroianni	CF	Vermont Mountaineers	Toronto Blue Jays	2011
Andy Parrino	2B	Manchester Silkworms	San Diego Padres	2011
Evan Scribner	P	North Adams SteepleCats	San Diego Padres	2011
Adam Wilk	P	Newport Gulls	Detroit Tigers	2011
Matt Adams	1B	Pittsfield Dukes	St. Louis Cardinals	2012
Scott Barnes	P	Holyoke Giants	Cleveland Indians	2012
Jeff Beliveau	P	Newport Gulls	Chicago Cubs	2012
Christian Friedrich	P	Vermont Mountaineers	Colorado Rockies	2012
Blake Lalli	C	Vermont Mountaineers	Chicago Cubs	2012
Matt McBride	LF	Holyoke Giants	Colorado Rockies	2012
Mike Olt	3B	Danbury Westerners	Texas Rangers	2012
Dan Otero	P	Newport Gulls	San Francisco Giants	2012
A. J. Pollock	CF	Vermont Mountaineers	Arizona Diamondbacks	2012
Steve Geltz	RHP	Concord Quarry Dogs/Torrington Twisters	Los Angeles Angels	2012
Tom Koehler	RHP	Keene Swamp Bats	Florida Marlins	2012
Josh Fields	RHP	Keene Swamp Bats	Houston Astros	2013
Michael Roth	LHP	Sanford Mainers	Los Angeles Angels	2013
Chris Colabello	1B	Lowell All-Americans	Minnesota Twins	2013
Alex Wood	LHP	Keene Swamp Bats	Atlanta Braves	2013
Ryan Reid	RHP	Sanford Mainers	Pittsburgh Pirates	2013
Juan Perez	OF	Holyoke Blue Sox	San Francisco Giants	2013
Josh Zeid	RHP	Torrington Twisters	Houston Astros	2013
Andrew Albers	LHP	Torrington Twisters	Minnesota Twins	2013
Kevin Chapman	LHP	North Shore Navigators	Houston Astros	2013
Nick Christiani	RHP	Manchester Silkworms	Cincinnati Reds	2013
Matt den Dekker	OF	Keene Swamp Bats	New York Mets	2013
Mike Belfiore	LHP	Pittsfield Dukes	Baltimore Orioles	2013
Nick Martinez	RHP	Vermont Mountaineers	Texas Rangers	2014
Greg Garcia	INF	Newport Gulls	St. Louis Cardinals	2014
Alex Hassan	OF	Pittsfield Dukes	Boston Red Sox	2014
Nick Greenwood	LHP	Vermont Mountaineers	St. Louis Cardinals	2014
Adam Duvall	3B	Sanford Mainers	San Francisco Giants	2014
Ben Paulsen	1B	Keene Swamp Bats	Colorado Rockies	2014
Billy Burns	CF	Danbury Westerners	Oakland Athletics	2014
Chris Taylor	SS	Newport Gulls	Seattle Mariners	2014
Chris Dominguez	RF	Newport Gulls	San Francisco Giants	2014
Jason Rogers	3B	Laconia Muskrats	Milwaukee Brewers	2014
Eric Jokisch	LHP	Torrington Twisters	Chicago Cubs	2014
Eric Goeddel	RHP	New Bedford Bay Sox	New York Mets	2014
Micah Johnson	2B	Vermont Mountaineers	Chicago White Sox	2015
Sean Gilmartin	LHP	North Shore Navigators	New York Mets	2015
Taylor Featherston	2B	New Bedford Bay Sox	Los Angeles Angels	2015
Adam Conley	LHP	Keene Swamp Bats	Miami Marlins	2015
Josh Smith	RHP	Torrington Twisters	Cincinnati Reds	2015
Cody Stanley	C	North Adams SteepleCats	St. Louis Cardinals	2015
Guido Knudson	RHP	North Adams SteepleCats	Detroit Tigers	2015
Tom Murphy	C	Holyoke Blue Sox	Colorado Rockies	2015
Matt Duffy	INF	Vermont Mountaineers	Houston Astros	2015
Matt Buschmann	RHP	Keene Swamp Bats	Arizona Diamondbacks	2016
Cody Ege	LHP	Vermont Mountaineers	Miami Marlins	2016
Pat Light	RHP	Newport Gulls	Boston Red Sox	2016
Andrew Triggs	RHP	New Bedford Bay Sox/Torrington Twisters	Oakland Athletics	2016
Tim Adleman	RHP	North Adams SteepleCats	Cincinnati Reds	2016
Daniel Wright	RHP	Newport Gulls	Cincinnati Reds	2016
Mike Freeman	2B	Keene Swamp Bats	Arizona Diamondbacks	2016
Matt Carasiti	RHP	Bristol Collegiate Baseball Club	Colorado Rockies	2016
Damien Magnifico	RHP	Laconia Muskrats	Milwaukee Brewers	2016
Joey Wendle	2B	Sanford Mainers	Oakland Athletics	2016
Trey Mancini	1B	Holyoke Blue Sox	Baltimore Orioles	2016
Mike Hauschild	RHP	Danbury Westerners	Texas Rangers	2017
Mark Leiter Jr.	RHP	Laconia Muskrats	Philadelphia Phillies	2017
Austin Slater	2B/RF	Newport Gulls	San Francisco Giants	2017
Michael Brady	RHP	Vermont Mountaineers	Oakland Athletics	2017
Adam Kolarek	LHP	Keene Swamp Bats	Tampa Bay Rays	2017
Dan Slania	RHP	North Shore Navigators	San Francisco Giants	2017
Luke Farrell	RHP	New Bedford Bay Sox	Kansas City Royals	2017
Andrew Kittredge	RHP	Newport Gulls	Tampa Bay Rays	2017
Troy Scribner	RHP	Vermont Mountaineers	Los Angeles Angels	2017
Kyle McGrath	LHP	Newport Gulls	San Diego Padres	2017
Jack Reinheimer	SS	Newport Gulls	Arizona Diamondbacks	2017
Kevin McGowan	RHP	Laconia Muskrats	New York Mets	2017
Chad Wallach	C	Laconia Muskrats	Cincinnati Reds	2017
Artie Lewicki	RHP	Keene Swamp Bats	Detroit Tigers	2017
Taylor Williams	RHP	Keene Swamp Bats	Milwaukee Brewers	2017
Mike Gerber	OF	Ocean State Waves	Detroit Tigers	2018
Eric Lauer	LHP	Keene Swamp Bats	San Diego Padres	2018
John Andreoli	OF	Pittsfield American Defenders	Seattle Mariners	2018
Brett Graves	RHP	Newport Gulls	Miami Marlins	2018
Evan Phillips	RHP	Laconia Muskrats	Atlanta Braves	2018
Jeffrey Springs	LHP	Plymouth Pilgrims	Texas Rangers	2018
Chris Shaw	LF	New Bedford Bay Sox	San Francisco Giants	2018
Joe Hudson	C	Mystic Schooners	Los Angeles Angels	2018
Dylan Moore	UTIL	Keene Swamp Bats	Seattle Mariners	2019
Frank Schwindel	1B	Keene Swamp Bats	Kansas City Royals	2019
Nick Margevicius	LHP	Plymouth Pilgrims	San Diego Padres	2019
Richard Lovelady	LHP	Ocean State Waves	Kansas City Royals	2019
Mike Ford	1B	Danbury Westerners	New York Yankees	2019
Branden Kline	RHP	Newport Gulls	Baltimore Orioles	2019
Matt Beaty	1B/LF	Saratoga Brigade	Los Angeles Dodgers	2019
Jared Walsh	1B/OF	Keene Swamp Bats	Los Angeles Angels	2019
James Bourque	RHP	Sanford Mainers	Washington Nationals	2019
Jack Mayfield	INF	North Shore Navigators	Houston Astros	2019
Will Smith	C	Newport Gulls	Los Angeles Dodgers	2019
Garrett Stubbs	C	Plymouth Pilgrims	Houston Astros	2019
Tommy Edman	INF	Newport Gulls	St. Louis Cardinals	2019
Brian O'Grady	CF	Vermont Mountaineers/Keene Swamp Bats	Cincinnati Reds	2019
Taylor Guilbeau	LHP	Newport Gulls	Seattle Mariners	2019
Nick Solak	2B	Vermont Mountaineers	Texas Rangers	2019
Tyler Rogers	RHP	Vermont Mountaineers	San Francisco Giants	2019
Ryan McBroom	1B	Laconia Muskrats	Kansas City Royals	2019
Danny Mendick	INF	Vermont Mountaineers	Chicago White Sox	2019
James Karinchak	RHP	Newport Gulls	Cleveland Indians	2019
Anthony Misiewicz	LHP	Newport Gulls	Seattle Mariners	2020
Vimael Machin	INF	Danbury Westerners	Oakland Athletics	2020
Jake Cronenworth	INF	Holyoke Blue Sox	San Diego Padres	2020
Kris Bubic	LHP	Newport Gulls	Kansas City Royals	2020
Kyle Hart	LHP	Newport Gulls	Boston Red Sox	2020
Ryan Jeffers	C	Upper Valley Nighthawks	Minnesota Twins	2020
Brent Rooker	OF	Plymouth Pilgrims	Minnesota Twins	2020
Jonathan Stiever	RHP	Vermont Mountaineers	Chicago White Sox	2020
Tommy Doyle	RHP	Keene Swamp Bats	Colorado Rockies	2020
Jordan Sheffield	RHP	Laconia Muskrats	Colorado Rockies	2021
Ben Bowden	LHP	Plymouth Pilgrims	Colorado Rockies	2021
Paul Campbell	RHP	Newport Gulls/Laconia Muskrats	Miami Marlins	2021
Joshua Palacios	OF	Danbury Westerners	Toronto Blue Jays	2021
Alec Bettinger	RHP	Keene Swamp Bats	Milwaukee Brewers	2021
Jason Foley	RHP	Mystic Schooners	Detroit Tigers	2021
Jake Cousins	RHP	Newport Gulls	Milwaukee Brewers	2021
Trey Amburgey	OF	Vermont Mountaineers	New York Yankees	2021
Josiah Gray	RHP	Danbury Westerners	Los Angeles Dodgers	2021
Jake Meyers	OF	Mystic Schooners	Houston Astros	2021
Shea Spitzbarth	RHP	Laconia Muskrats	Pittsburgh Pirates	2021
Packy Naughton	LHP	Plymouth Pilgrims	Los Angeles Angels	2021
Jacob Robson	OF	Plymouth Pilgrims	Detroit Tigers	2021
Jonathan Heasley	RHP	Newport Gulls	Kansas City Royals	2021
Brandyn Sittinger	RHP	Laconia Muskrats	Arizona Diamondbacks	2021
Jeremy Pena	SS	Plymouth Pilgrims	Houston Astros	2022
Bennett Sousa	LHP	Keene Swamp Bats	Chicago White Sox	2022
Jason Krizan	3B/LF	Pittsfield Dukes	San Francisco Giants	2022
Ryan Pepiot	RHP	Keene Swamp Bats	Los Angeles Dodgers	2022
Cam Alldred	LHP	Upper Valley Nighthawks	Pittsburgh Pirates	2022
Jose Cuas	RHP	North Adams SteepleCats	Kansas City Royals	2022
Jackson Tetreault	RHP	Laconia Muskrats	Washington Nationals	2022
David MacKinnon	1B	New Bedford Bay Sox	Los Angeles Angels	2022
Sean Bouchard	1B/OF	Newport Gulls	Colorado Rockies	2022
Darick Hall	1B	Keene Swamp Bats	Philadelphia Phillies	2022
Mark Appel	RHP	Newport Gulls	Philadelphia Phillies	2022
David Villar	3B	Danbury Westerners	San Francisco Giants	2022
JJ Bleday	OF	Newport Gulls	Miami Marlins	2022
Jack Larsen	OF	Plymouth Pilgrims	Seattle Mariners	2022
Chuckie Robinson	C	Ocean State Waves	Cincinnati Reds	2022
Gavin Hollowell	RHP	Keene Swamp Bats	Colorado Rockies	2022
Brian O'Keefe	C	Saratoga Brigade	Seattle Mariners	2022
Jared Shuster	LHP	New Bedford Bay Sox	Atlanta Braves	2023
Zach Neto	SS	North Adams SteepleCats	Los Angeles Angels	2023
Tom Cosgrove	LHP	Vermont Mountaineers	San Diego Padres	2023
Matt Mervis	1B	New Bedford Bay Sox	Chicago Cubs	2023
Jake Alu	INF	Sanford Mainers	Washington Nationals	2023
Garrett Acton	RHP	Plymouth Pilgrims	Oakland Athletics	2023
Coco Montes	INF	Danbury Westerners	Colorado Rockies	2023
Joe Jacques	LHP	Vermont Mountaineers	Boston Red Sox	2023
Ty Adcock	RHP	Upper Valley Nighthawks	Seattle Mariners	2023
Brendan White	RHP	Danbury Westerners	Detroit Tigers	2023
Emmet Sheehan	RHP	Danbury Westerners	Los Angeles Dodgers	2023
Connor Kaiser	SS	Newport Gulls	Colorado Rockies	2023
Declan Cronin	RHP	Plymouth Pilgrims	Chicago White Sox	2023
Erik Miller	LHP	Newport Gulls	San Francisco Giants	2024
Tyler Ferguson	RHP	Newport Gulls	Oakland Athletics	2024
Justyn-Henry Malloy	OF	Newport Gulls	Detroit Tigers	2024
Armando Alvarez	INF	Plymouth Pilgrims	Oakland Athletics	2024
Gordon Graceffo	RHP	North Adams SteepleCats	St. Louis Cardinals	2024
Will Warren	RHP	Martha's Vineyard Sharks	New York Yankees	2024
Kameron Misner	OF	Newport Gulls	Tampa Bay Rays	2024
Will Wagner	2B	Keene Swamp Bats	Toronto Blue Jays	2024
Jonathan Bermudez	LHP	Plymouth Pilgrims	Miami Marlins	2024
Ben Casparius	RHP	Ocean State Waves	Los Angeles Dodgers	2024
Alan Roden	OF	Upper Valley Nighthawks	Toronto Blue Jays	2025
Tim Tawa	2B	Newport Gulls	Arizona Diamondbacks	2025
Ben Williamson	3B	Vermont Mountaineers	Seattle Mariners	2025
Jack Little	RHP	Newport Gulls	Los Angeles Dodgers	2025
Josh Simpson	LHP	North Adams SteepleCats	Miami Marlins	2025
Brandyn Garcia	LHP	Newport Gulls/Ocean State Waves	Seattle Mariners	2025
PJ Poulin	LHP	New Bedford Bay Sox	Washington Nationals	2025
Cam Devanney	3B	Winnipesaukee Muskrats/Danbury Westerners	Pittsburgh Pirates	2025
CJ Stubbs	C	Valley Blue Sox	Washington Nationals	2025
Matt Pushard	RHP	Sanford Mainers	St. Louis Cardinals	2026
Ryan Ward	1B	Ocean State Waves	Los Angeles Dodgers	2026
Chase Solesky	RHP	Plymouth Pilgrims	Tampa Bay Rays	2026
Joshua Kuroda-Grauer	INF	Newport Gulls	Athletics	2026
Jack Weisenburger	RHP	Sanford Mainers	New York Mets	2026

== Media ==
All NECBL games are broadcast online through the NECBL Broadcast Network from Blueframe, with Pointstreak providing live stats for all games.

On May 14, 2010, the league signed an agreement with Pointstreak. Pointstreak provides "real-time scoring, official statistics, and administration services" to the NECBL. A highlight of Pointstreak's services is Game Live, a real-time statistics feature providing play-by-play for every NECBL game.

In 2020, the league announced that Blueframe would provide the official streaming service for the league.

== See also ==
- List of Collegiate Summer Baseball Leagues
