= Bristol Blues =

Baseball team in Connecticut, United States

- Logo

Information
- League: NECBL (South Division)
- Location: Bristol, CT (2015-present)
- Ballpark: Muzzy Field (2015-present)
- Founded: 2015
- Former name: Bristol Blues (2015-present)
- Former leagues: NECBL (2020-present); Southern Division (2020-present); FCBL (2015-2019)
- Colors: Blue, White, Red
- Management: Jordan Scheiner (GM)
- Manager: Gregg Hunt
- Website: bristolbluesbaseball.com

The Bristol Blues are a summer collegiate baseball team based in Bristol, Connecticut. It is a member of the New England Collegiate Baseball League (NECBL), a wood-bat league with a 44-game regular season that has 13 franchises covering all six New England states. The team's home games are played at Muzzy Field in Bristol.

== Ownership ==
The Bristol franchise was founded for the 2015 season by Elliot Scheiner, real estate developer David Lindland, and entrepreneur Steve Lindland.

== History ==
In the team's first season it won the Futures Collegiate Baseball League's West Division. In the playoffs it won its quarterfinal and semifinal games, advancing to the best-of-three league championship series against the defending champion Worcester Bravehearts. The teams split the first two games and were tied after nine innings in the third, at Muzzy Field, but the Bravehearts scored two runs in the top of the tenth to repeat as champions.

For the 2020 season, the Bristol Blues changed leagues, moving from the Futures Collegiate Baseball League to the New England Collegiate Baseball League. After joining the NECBL, the Blues appeared in the 2023 championship series but lost to the Newport Gulls 2-0.
