= Holman Stadium (Nashua) =

Baseball stadium in New Hampshire, U.S.

- Historic Holman Stadium
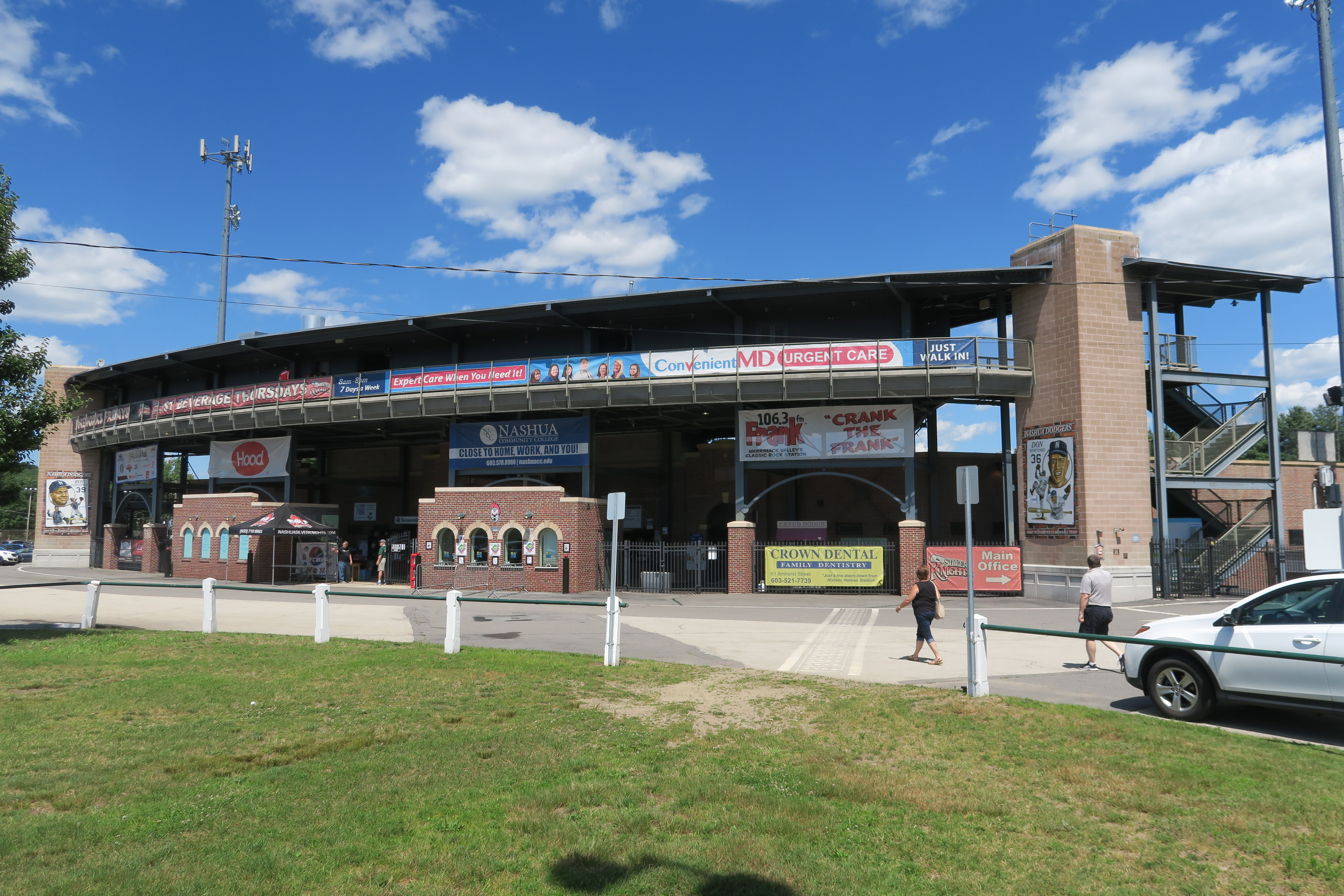
- Interactive map of Holman Stadium
- Location: 67 Amherst Street; Nashua, New Hampshire 03064
- Coordinates: 42°46′8.71″N 71°28′23.50″W
- Owner: City of Nashua
- Capacity: 2,800
- Surface: Grass
- Field size: Left Field: 307 ft Center Field: 401 ft Right Field: 315 ft

Construction
- Opened: September 23, 1937
- Renovated: 2002

Tenants
- Nashua Silver Knights (Futures Collegiate Baseball League) 2011–present American Defenders of New Hampshire (Can-Am League) 2009; Nashua Pride (Atlantic League/Can-Am League) 1998–2008; Nashua Hawks (North Atlantic League) 1995–1996; Nashua Pirates (Eastern League) 1984–1986; Nashua Angels (Eastern League) 1983; Nashua Dodgers (New England League) 1946–1949

Holman Stadium is a baseball stadium in Nashua, New Hampshire. It was constructed in 1937, as a multi-purpose stadium, by the City of Nashua. The official seating capacity is 2,800 people. Holman is the home of the Nashua Silver Knights of the Futures Collegiate Baseball League.

== History ==
The city-owned stadium is named for Charles Frank Holman, who contributed $55,000 for the project. Holman Stadium, which also was funded by the federal Works Progress Administration during the Great Depression, was dedicated to the youth and people of Nashua in memory of Holman's parents. Philip S. Avery, a Nashua native, was the architect. The original Holman Stadium was a plain seating bowl in which fans sat on bleachers and concrete steps. It was used for baseball and football. The stadium has hosted concerts by famous artists including Aerosmith, The Beach Boys, Bon Jovi, David Cassidy, Elvis Costello, Bob Dylan, The J. Geils Band, Whitney Houston, Tina Turner, Carlos Santana, Phish, Warren Zevon, and Bonnie Raitt opening for James Taylor. In 1996, the stadium was a site for celebrations along the Olympic Torch Relay route.

=== Affiliated baseball ===
The stadium was home to several minor-league affiliates of Major League Baseball organizations, beginning with the Nashua Dodgers, affiliated with the Brooklyn Dodgers and managed by Walter Alston. Holman hosted the first integrated U.S. baseball team in the modern era when Roy Campanella and Don Newcombe played for the Nashua Dodgers in 1946. A historic marker highlighting this was unveiled at Holman Stadium in 2023 by the Black Heritage Trail of New Hampshire.

After the Dodgers' four-year run, baseball did not return to Holman Stadium until 1983, at the Double-A level: an affiliate of the California Angels for one year, then an affiliate of the Pittsburgh Pirates. While home to the Nashua Pirates in 1985, Holman Stadium hosted the Eastern League All-Star Game.

=== Independent baseball ===
The Nashua Hawks of the North Atlantic League played at Holman Stadium in 1995, ending in 1996 with a mid-season eviction for nonpayment of rent.

In 1998, Holman Stadium became home to the Nashua Pride of the Atlantic League. The Pride acquired turquoise-colored stadium seating from Fulton County Stadium in Atlanta, Georgia. The Pride's pre-emption of dates from high-school football became a focus of neighborhood opposition, but eventually the city built Stellos Stadium for football.

Between the 2001 and 2002 seasons, the stadium was upgraded generally: The open-air desks in the brick press box were raised, enclosed and modernized; a new level of luxury boxes was built above it, the concourse outside the seating bowl was upgraded with a ticket office and gift shop, and the business offices were upgraded. In 2003, Holman Stadium hosted the Atlantic League All-Star Game.

In 2006, the Pride switched to the Can-Am League with its shorter season. In 2008, the team was sold to an ownership group including former Boston Red Sox General Manager Dan Duquette and renamed the American Defenders of New Hampshire. The Defenders played a single season in 2009, concluded on the road because of non-payments to the city; in 2010, the team moved to Pittsfield, Massachusetts to become the Pittsfield Colonials.

=== Collegiate baseball ===
In 2011, the Nashua Silver Knights brought baseball back to Holman Stadium. In 2012, Holman Stadium hosted the inaugural FCBL All-Star Game. The former football bleachers, down the left-field line, were removed, reducing the stadium's capacity to the current 2,800; the football press box remains but is now used as a storage shed.

In 2017, the city installed a new sound system and a small videoboard beyond left field, costing $173,000, of which $56,000 was paid for by the Silver Knights. The videoboard supersedes a two-line alphanumeric message board that had not worked for the preceding four years and could not be repaired.

In the springtime, the stadium serves as the home field for two of Nashua's schools, the Raiders of Rivier University and the Cardinals of Bishop Guertin High School.

== Competitors ==
Baseball clubs at Holman Stadium compete for fans' attention with the New Hampshire Fisher Cats in Manchester (double-A affiliate of the Toronto Blue Jays); and with the Lowell Spinners (single-A affiliate of the Boston Red Sox) until 2020. The Spinners owned and operated the Nashua Silver Knights until 2016.

== Sources ==
- Daly, Steve. 2002. Dem Little Bums. Concord, NH: Plaidswede Publishing Co. ISBN 0-9626832-4-8
- Nashua History Committee. 1977. The Nashua Experience: History in the Making, 1673–1978. Concord NH: Phoenix Publishing (see pp. 230–231).
- Roper, Scott C., and Stephanie Abbot Roper. 1998. "'We're Going to Give All We Have for this Grand Little Town': Baseball Integration and the 1946 Nashua Dodgers." Historical New Hampshire 53:1/2 (Spring/Summer 1998) 3–19.
