= 2025 FCBL season =

15th annual season of Futures Collegiate Baseball League

- League: Futures Collegiate Baseball League
- Sport: Baseball
- Duration: May 28 – August 9 (Playoffs: August 10 – August 16)
- Games: 62 (186 games in total)
- Teams: 6

Futures Collegiate Baseball League Championship
- Champions: Norwich Sea Unicorns
- Runners-up: New Britain Bees
- Finals MVP: Bryce Detwiler

Seasons
- ← 2024 2026 →

The 2025 FCBL season was the 15th season of collegiate summer baseball in the Futures Collegiate Baseball League (FCBL), a collegiate summer baseball league in the Northeastern United States, since its creation in 2010.

The Norwich Sea Unicorns entered the season as two-time defending champions, having defeated the Westfield Starfires, two games to zero, in the league's 2024 championship series.

== Season schedule ==
The league is scheduled to operate with six teams during the 2025 season. The Brockton Rox ceased operation, with its name taken on by a professional team previously known as the New England Knockouts in the Frontier League.

The Pittsfield Suns got scheduled to sit out the season, as Wahconah Park was not be ready. With an even number of teams in the league, the Road Warriors were dropped from the schedule.

The season will be played with a 62-game schedule, with the regular season starting on May 28 and concluding on August 9. The top four teams in the regular season standing will qualify for the playoffs that start on August 10.

== Regular season standings ==
Pos	Team	G	W	L	Pct.	GB
1	x – Worcester Bravehearts	61	45	16	.738	--
2	x – Vermont Lake Monsters	62	40	22	.645	5.5
3	x – New Britain Bees	61	29	32	.475	16.0
4	x – Norwich Sea Unicorns	61	28	33	.459	17.0
5	Nashua Silver Knights	60	24	36	.400	20.5
6	Westfield Starfires	61	17	44	.279	28.0

- x – Clinched playoff spot

== Statistical leaders ==
=== Hitting ===
Stat	Player	Team	Total
HR	Shaun McMillan	Vermont Lake Monsters	11
AVG	Patrick Shrake	Nashua Silver Knights	.342
RBIs	Shaun McMillan	Vermont Lake Monsters	52
SB	Cole Patterson	Nashua Silver Knights	23

=== Pitching ===
Stat	Player	Team	Total
W	Various Players	Various Teams	5
ERA	Garret Garbinski	New Britain Bees	0.70
SO	John Delgado	Vermont Lake Monsters	53
SV	Sean Gamble	Vermont Lake Monsters	10

== Awards ==
Award	Player	Team
Most Valuable Player	Shaun McMillan	Vermont Lake Monsters
Pro Prospect of the Year	Shaun McMillan	Vermont Lake Monsters
Pitcher of the Year	John Delgado	Vermont Lake Monsters
Relief Pitcher of the Year	Evan Mello	New Britain Bees
Manager of the Year	Luke Beckstein	Worcester Bravehearts

== Playoffs ==
=== Format ===
The postseason will feature four teams playing a best-of-three format for both the semifinals and championship series.

In the semifinals, the #1 seed will play the #4 seed and the #2 seed will play the #3 seed in a best-of-three series. The winners will play in the championship.

The team with the highest points percentage shall be home in game 1, on the road for game 2 and if necessary home for game 3. The sites for the games can be changed if mutually agreed upon by the two teams and the commissioner.

The following will be used as tiebreaking procedure:

1. Total Points Percentage

2. Points

3. Head-to-Head

=== Playoff bracket ===
Semifinals (best-of-three)
1	Worcester Bravehearts	4	1	X
4	Norwich Sea Unicorns	8	2	X
2	Vermont Lake Monsters	8	0	2
3	New Britain Bees	0	1	6

Futures Collegiate Baseball League Championship Series (best-of-three)
4	Norwich Sea Unicorns	0	5	13
3	New Britain Bees	1	4	4

== See also ==
- 2025 Major League Baseball season
- 2025 Prospect League season
