= Pete Wilk =

American baseball coach (1965 – 2024)

Biographical details
- Born: April 22, 1965; Barrington, Rhode Island, U.S.
- Died: April 2, 2024 (aged 58); Virginia, U.S.

Playing career
- 1984–1987: Rollins

Coaching career (HC unless noted)
- 1990–1991: Boston University (asst.)
- 1992–1995: Harvard (asst.)
- 1996: Acton-Boxborough (MA)
- 1997–1999: Georgetown (asst.)
- 1997: Harwich Mariners (asst.)
- 1998–1999: Mat-Su Miners
- 2000–2020: Georgetown
- 2021–2023: Vermont Lake Monsters

Head coaching record
- Overall: 426–668
- Tournaments: Big East: 0–4; NCAA: 0–0

Accomplishments and honors

Championships
- Futures League Champion (2021)

Awards
- 2x Futures League Manager of the Year (2021, 2022)

Peter Wilk (April 22, 1965 – April 2, 2024) was an American baseball coach and player. He played college baseball at Rollins College for Boyd Coffie from 1984 to 1987. He then served as the head coach of the Georgetown Hoyas (2000–2020). He was the manager for the Vermont Lake Monsters of the Futures Collegiate Baseball League. Wilk died from brain cancer on April 2, 2024, at the age of 58.

== Playing career ==
Wilk played college baseball for the Rollins Tars. Following his career at Rollins, Wilk played semi-professional baseball.

== Coaching career ==
Wilk coached at Boston University as an assistant in 1990 and 1991. In 1992, Wilk joined the Harvard Crimson baseball program as an assistant. Wilk was named the Acton-Boxborough Regional High School head baseball coach. In the fall of 1996, Wilk was named an assistant at Georgetown University. He was named the head coach when Kirk Mason resigned in 1999.

In 1997, Wilk served as an assistant coach for the Harwich Mariners of the Cape Cod Baseball League under manager Chad Holbrook. The Mariners won the league's Eastern Division Championship before falling in the title series to the Wareham Gatemen.

In 1998 and 1999, Wilk skippered the Mat-Su Miners of the Alaska Baseball League. The team compiled a 41-48 record in his two seasons at the helm.

On September 9, 2009, Wilk and the Hoyas were penalized by the NCAA for misusing the work study program which allowed players to receive money for jobs they were not doing.

On May 20, 2015, the Hoyas qualified for the Big East baseball tournament for the first time since 1986. The Hoyas went 0–2 in their return to the postseason. On July 29, 2020, Wilk resigned as the head coach of the Hoyas.

On April 12, 2021, Wilk signed with the Vermont Lake Monsters of the Futures Collegiate Baseball League and served as their manager. In his inaugural season with the club, Wilk guided the Lake Monsters to a 42-24 record, the top seed in the FCBL Playoffs, and a league championship. Wilk was named Futures League Co-Manager of the Year of his efforts. In 2022, Wilk's team again finished with the best regular season record in the league (44-19), but fell in the league title series to Nashua. He was named FCBL Manager of the Year again in 2022. Wilk's 2023 season, the final baseball season he'd coach, resulted in a 38-23 record and a third straight trip to the Futures League Championship, but the Lake Monsters lost to Norwich.

== Death ==
On April 2, 2024, at age 58, Wilk died after a battle with brain cancer. The Lake Monsters continued to recognize Wilk as the team's skipper during the 2024 season, under the title "Head Coach (In Memory Of). His number 45 jersey hangs outside the team's clubhouse and the number has been "unofficially retired by the team for the foreseeable future." Matt Fincher, Wilk's top assistant coach, was named Vermont's Head Coach for the 2024 season.

== Head coaching record ==
Record table
Season	Team	Overall	Conference	Standing	Postseason
Georgetown Hoyas (Big East Conference) (2000–2020)
2000	Georgetown	13–43	1–24	10th	
2001	Georgetown	17–39	7–19	10th	
2002	Georgetown	9–47	2–24	11th	
2003	Georgetown	14–33	4–22	11th	
2004	Georgetown	25–30	8–17	11th	
2005	Georgetown	25–31	7–18	10th	
2006	Georgetown	24–32	7–17	10th	
2007	Georgetown	21–34	8–18	12th	
2008	Georgetown	18–33	4–14	12th	
2009	Georgetown	17–34	6–16	10th	
2010	Georgetown	24–31	4–14	12th	
2011	Georgetown	23–33	5–22	12th	
2012	Georgetown	24–29	9–17	9th	
2013	Georgetown	25–28	5–19	11th	
2014	Georgetown	19–29	5–13	6th	
2015	Georgetown	25–28	8–10	4th	Big East Tournament
2016	Georgetown	25–29	8–10	5th	
2017	Georgetown	27–28	4–14	7th	
2018	Georgetown	25–30	8–8	4th	Big East Tournament
2019	Georgetown	22–34	7–11	5th	
2020	Georgetown	4–13	0–0		Season canceled due to COVID-19
Vermont Lake Monsters (FCBL) (2021–Present)
2021	Vermont Lake Monsters	42–24		1st	FCBL Champions
2022	Vermont Lake Monsters	44–19		1st	Lost FCBL Finals
2023	Vermont Lake Monsters	38-23		2nd	Lost FCBL Finals
Georgetown:		426–668	117–327		
Vermont:		124-66			
Total:		512–711			
National champion Postseason invitational champion Conference regular season champion Conference regular season and conference tournament champion Division regular season champion Division regular season and conference tournament champion Conference tournament champion
