= 2026 FCBL season =

16th annual season of Futures Collegiate Baseball League

- League: Futures Collegiate Baseball League
- Sport: Baseball
- Duration: May 27 – August 10 (Playoffs: August 11 – August 17)
- Games: 60 (210 games in total)
- Teams: 7

Futures Collegiate Baseball League Championship

Seasons
- ← 2025 2027 →

The 2026 FCBL season is the 16th season of collegiate summer baseball in the Futures Collegiate Baseball League (FCBL), a collegiate summer baseball league in the Northeastern United States, since its creation in 2010. There are 7 FCBL teams.

The Norwich Sea Unicorns entered the season as three-time defending champions, having defeated the New Britain Bees, two games to one, in the league's 2025 championship series.

== Season schedule ==
The league is scheduled to operate with seven teams during the 2026 season.

It was announced during the offseason that the Lowell Spinners, who were a professional Class A Short Season minor league affiliate that played in the New York–Penn League, would be revived and join the league. It would be the first time that the city of Lowell, Massachusetts would have summertime baseball since the Spinners lost their minor league affiliation in the 2021 reorganization of Minor League Baseball (MiLB).

The Pittsfield Suns are again scheduled to sit out the season, as Wahconah Park will be demolished and a new stadium will not be ready, making the return date of the team unknown.

The season will be played with a 60-game schedule, with the regular season starting on May 27 and concluding on August 10. The top four teams in the regular season standings will qualify for the playoffs that start on August 11.

== Regular season standings ==
Pos	Team	G	W	L	Pct.	GB
1	Vermont Lake Monsters	42	30	12	.714	--
2	New Britain Bees	39	22	17	.564	6.5
3	Nashua Silver Knights	40	20	20	.500	9.0
4	Norwich Sea Unicorns	41	19	22	.463	10.5
5	Worcester Bravehearts	41	19	22	.463	10.5
6	Lowell Spinners	44	18	26	.409	13.0
7	Westfield Starfires	39	15	24	.385	13.5

- x – Clinched playoff spot

== Statistical leaders ==
=== Hitting ===
Stat	Player	Team	Total
HR			
AVG			
RBIs			
SB			

=== Pitching ===
Stat	Player	Team	Total
W			
ERA			
SO			
SV			

== Awards ==
=== All-star selections ===
Hitters
Position	Player	Team
C		
1B		
2B		
3B		
SS		
OF		
OF		
OF		
UT		
DH		

Pitchers
Position	Player	Team
SP		
SP		
SP		
SP		
RP		
RP		
RP		
RP		

=== End of year awards ===
Award	Player	Team
Most Valuable Player		
Pro Prospect of the Year		
Pitcher of the Year		
Relief Pitcher of the Year		
Manager of the Year		

== Playoffs ==
=== Format ===
The postseason will feature four teams playing a best-of-three format for both the semifinals and championship series.

In the semifinals, the #1 seed will play the #4 seed and the #2 seed will play the #3 seed in a best-of-three series. The winners will play in the championship.

The team with the highest points percentage shall be home in game 1, on the road for game 2 and if necessary home for game 3. The sites for the games can be changed if mutually agreed upon by the two teams and the commissioner.

The following will be used as tiebreaking procedure:

1. Total Points Percentage

2. Points

3. Head-to-Head

=== Playoff bracket ===
Semifinals (best-of-three)
1
4
2
3

Futures Collegiate Baseball League Championship Series (best-of-three)

== See also ==
- 2026 Appalachian League season
- 2026 Major League Baseball season
- 2026 Northwoods League season
- 2026 PGCBL season
- 2026 Prospect League season
