= Seacoast Mavericks =

Logo
Cap insignia

Information
- League: FCBL (East Division)
- Location: Portsmouth, NH (2013-2017); Rochester, NH (2011-2012)
- Founded: 2010
- Folded: 2019
- Former ballpark(s): Leary Field (2013-2017); Bert George Field (2011-2012)
- Colors: Red, White, Blue
- Ownership: Dave Hoyt
- Website: seacoastmavericks.com

The Seacoast Mavericks were a collegiate summer baseball team located in Portsmouth, New Hampshire. It was a charter member of the Futures Collegiate Baseball League (FCBL), a wood-bat league in New England. It suspended operation in 2017 pending completion of a sports complex in Dover, New Hampshire. However, in 2019, it abandoned its FCBL franchise.

== Ownership and management ==
The team was owned by Dave Hoyt, a former minor-league player for the Minnesota Twins and St. Louis Cardinals and the owner of USA Training Centers in Newington. This facility ran a youth and showcase program called the USA Mavericks Baseball Club, from which the team took its name.

Former Boston Red Sox pitcher Bob Stanley was president of the club.

== Results ==
In 2011 and 2012, the Mavericks played at Bert George Field in Rochester, the ballpark of Spaulding High School on the north side of the city. The club invested $50,000 to build new dugouts and seating areas and make other improvements to the ballpark. Earlier, the club had studied Marshwood High School in South Berwick, Maine as a home.

The inaugural year started with tragedy as player Adam Keenan collapsed and died of heart failure after the team's first practice. The Mavericks finished the year with a record of 10-33, in last place in that year's four-team league.

In 2012, the FCBL expanded to 9 teams, recruiting the Old Orchard Beach Raging Tide and the North Shore Navigators away from the similar New England Collegiate Baseball League. These two teams joined the Nashua franchise as rivals just over an hour's drive from Rochester. A semifinal round was added to the playoffs. The team finished in 8th place with a regular-season record of 20-33.

The Mavericks played 6 of the home games of the 2012 season at Leary Field in Portsmouth, New Hampshire. Daboul described attendance for those games at "about 500" per game, exceeding the team's average of 251 for the season.

In 2013, the club adopted Leary Field as its home, improved the dugouts, and installed new on-field bullpens. On 30 June, the team hosted the Old Orchard Beach team at Marshwood H.S. as part of a day of activities in memory of former student Troy Pappas. This was the league's first all-Maine contest. The Mavericks reported a franchise-record attendance of 1622. The regular-season record of 21-32 slightly surpassed the previous year but again put the club in 8th place, 4½ games out of contention for the post-season.

For the 2014 season, the FCBL acquired a tenth team and placed the Mavericks in the East Division. Former Maverick player Tommy Chase was promoted to manager. The team ended the regular season at 24-29, two games behind the final playoff wildcard.

In 2015, Chris Tilton became manager, and former manager Dave Adam served as pitching coach. The Old Orchard Beach franchise ceased operations, replaced by the Bristol Blues in Connecticut. The Nashua team was moved to the East Division to compensate, putting New Hampshire's two franchises in the same division. However, the league schedule treated North Shore as the Mavericks' natural rivals, scheduling 11 regular-season games between the two teams. Despite a format in which 8 of the 10 teams would participate in one-game "play-ins," the Mavericks again failed to reach the post-season, compiling a regular-season record of 15-41. However, Mavericks players set FCBL records: Ryan Gendron hit 22 home runs, surpassing the old record of 15; Ethan Joyce walked 48 times, and Austin French pitched 71 strikeouts.

== 2016 season ==
In May 2016, USA Training Centers presented a site plan to the Brentwood, New Hampshire Planning Board to move the Mavericks to "a baseball stadium to seat 3,000 to 4,000 people".

Ben Bizier became the manager of an all-new roster. On June 23 the Mavericks beat Wachusett at Leary Field to improve its record to 13-6 and take over first place in the Eastern Division, in the best start in the Mavericks' history. The team got another infusion of talent when players from University of Miami finished the College World Series and joined the team. After exchanging the division lead with Nashua several times, the Mavericks finished first in the Eastern Division at 36-18. The Mavericks played a semifinal series against Nashua, won the first game in Nashua but lost the next two at home. The FCBL named Bizier its Manager of the Year.

== 2017 season ==
In November 2016, the Mavericks abandoned the move to Brentwood in favor of a Sports Complex project on a 106-acre site off Tolend Road in Dover with similar commercial partnerships. On January 24, 2017, the Dover Planning Board voted unanimously to rezone the land from residential to industrial, a move confirmed by the Dover City Council in an 8-1 vote on March 8.

The club hired Kyle Edwards as General Manager and promoted coach Jhonneris Mendez to field manager. The Futures League published a 2017 schedule for a nine-team league omitting the Torrington Titans. The Mavericks could have qualified for the playoffs by sweeping a home doubleheader against Nashua on August 6, but lost the second game.

== Dormancy ==
At the end of the 2017 season, Hoyt declared that the Mavericks would not return to Leary Field in 2018, citing "small [field] dimensions and small crowds." On November 8, the league published a schedule for 2018 omitting Seacoast as well as the Wachusett Dirt Dawgs. The league's press release said the Mavericks would "continue to work on building a new complex in Dover, NH with the hopes of having the Mavericks playing in 2019 at the new facility." The Dover City Council rezoned the project site to permit commercial use, and the club bought the property in July 2018. Mendez went to manage the Martha's Vineyard Sharks to the 2018 FCBL co-championship. The Mavericks paid FCBL dues but did not field a team in 2018 and 2019.

In May 2019, owner Dave Hoyt "ended the summer college team franchise" and vacated the Newington training facility.

== Regular-season results and attendance ==
Year	Record	Place	Attendance
2011	10-33 (.233)	4th	4,108 (4th of 4)
2012	20-33 (.377)	8th	6,532 (8th of 9)
2013	21-32 (.396)	8th	11,309 (8th of 9)
2014	24-29 (.453)	4th in East	9,718 (9th of 10)
2015	15-41 (.268)	5th in East	9,978 (8th of 10)
2016	36-18 (.667)	1st in East	8,063 (9th of 10)
2017	25-29 (.463)	4th in East	6,944 (8th of 9)

== Postseason appearances ==
Year	Play-In Round	Semi-Final Round		FCBL Championship
2016	Bye (won Eastern Division)	Nashua Silver Knights	L (1-2)	
