= 100 Inning Game =

Annual charity fundraising event

The 100 Inning Game is an annual charity fundraising event that raises money for amyotrophic lateral sclerosis (ALS) research. It was founded by the Boston Men's Baseball League, the largest amateur baseball league in New England, in 2004.

Each year, over one hundred players from the Boston Men's Baseball League and other teams from the surrounding area get together in the spring to play a full 100 consecutive innings of baseball. It often takes about 36 hours to complete. Curt Schilling's wife makes an annual appearance at the charity event, even playing a few innings on occasion.

== History ==
=== The beginning ===
The 100 Inning Game was first conceived in February 2004 by Brett Rudy and Mike Lembo, both members of the Boston Men's Baseball League. Through e-mail communication, the two developed the idea behind the charity event, which was to create a game that would coincide with the arrival of the newly acquired Boston Red Sox pitcher, Curt Schilling, and which would support his charitable organization, Curt's Pitch for ALS.

A meeting between Brett, Mike, and the ALS Association MA Chapter ensued and a deal was quickly struck to get things underway. After some convincing to the City of Boston's Department of Conservation and Recreation a permit was issued to use Kelly Field in Hyde Park for the inaugural game - marking the first time the City of Boston had ever granted permission for an all night event to take place. A date of April 17 and 18 was decided upon; the dates are also 'Marathon Weekend'.

That first year, the players had raised over $113,000. The game was played by 180 players and took over 36 hours to complete. A check was presented by the game organizers to Curt Schilling on the field at Fenway Park later that year.

=== Since 2005 ===
The 2005 edition of the 100 Inning Game was played at the Campanelli Stadium in Brockton, Massachusetts, and was hosted by the Brockton Rox. That year, the event collected even larger funds, with over $113,000 raised and presented to the charity by year's end.

The following year, the event was played at the Hanover Insurance Park at Fitton Field stadium, located at the College of the Holy Cross in Worcester, Massachusetts, the home of the Can-Am professional league Worcester Tornadoes. This year brought in an additional $85,000 to the charity, making the three-year total of the 100 Inning Game $310,000 donated to Curt's Pitch for ALS.

The 2008 game was held on August 30 and 31 at Adams Field in Quincy, marking a change in date. The game also removed the "Dirty Dozen", the 12 people who could participate all 100 Innings.

== See also ==
- ALS
