= Oil Can Boyd =

American baseball player (born 1959)

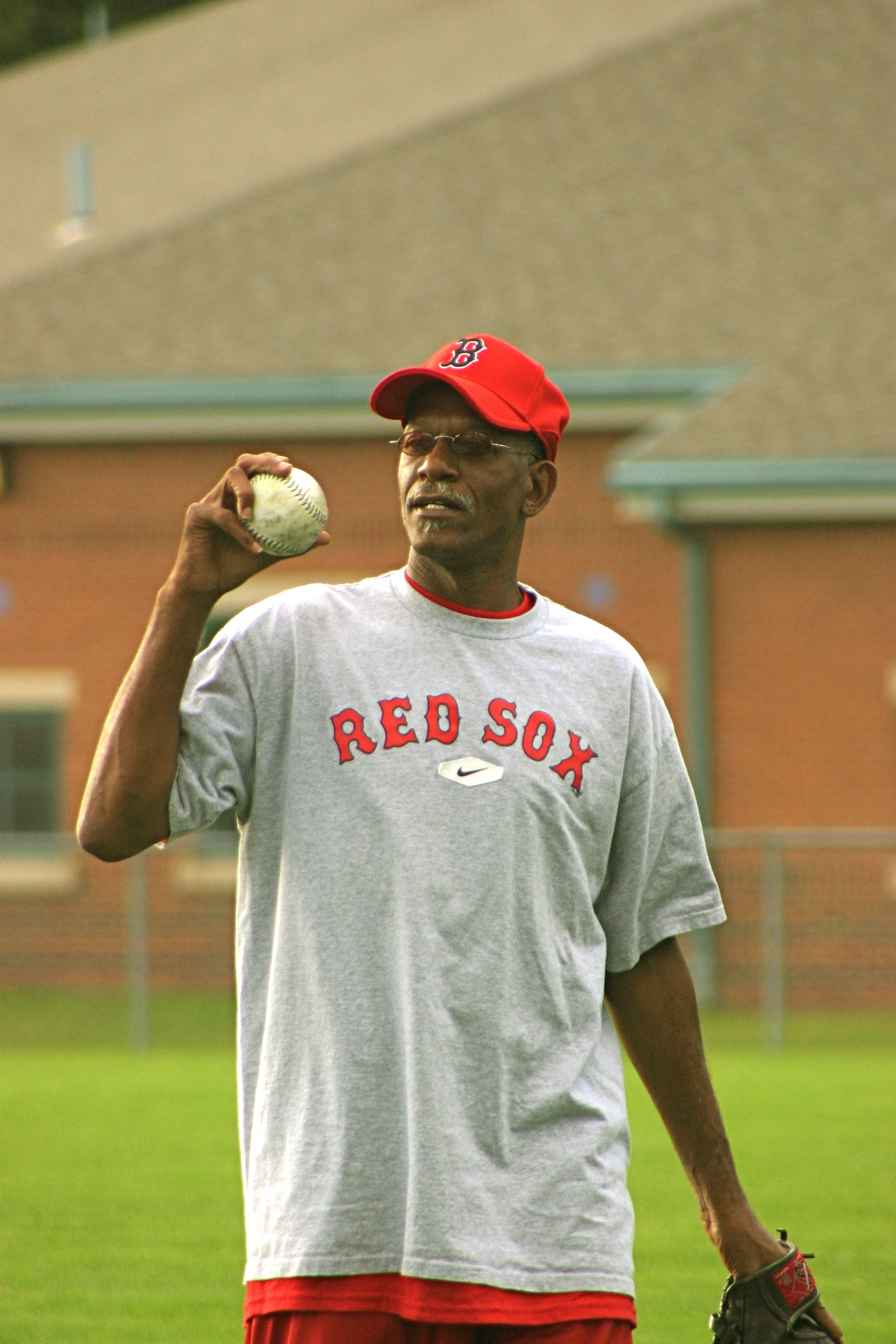
- Oil Can Boyd in 2008
- Pitcher
- Born: October 6, 1959 (age 67); Meridian, Mississippi, U.S.
- Batted: Right Threw: Right

MLB debut
- September 13, 1982, for the Boston Red Sox

Last MLB appearance
- October 1, 1991, for the Texas Rangers

MLB statistics
- Win–loss record: 78–77
- Earned run average: 4.04
- Strikeouts: 799
- Stats at Baseball Reference

Teams
- Boston Red Sox (1982–1989); Montreal Expos (1990–1991); Texas Rangers (1991)

Dennis Ray "Oil Can" Boyd (born October 6, 1959) is an American former professional baseball pitcher. Boyd played in Major League Baseball (MLB) for the Boston Red Sox (1982–1989), Montreal Expos (1990–1991), and Texas Rangers (1991). In a 10-season career, Boyd collected a 78–77 record with 799 strikeouts and a 4.04 ERA in 1,389.2 innings.

His nickname has been reported as coming from his beer-drinking days in his hometown of Meridian, Mississippi, where beer was referred to as "oil".

== Early life ==
Dennis Ray "Oil Can" Boyd was born October 6, 1959, to Willie "Skeeter" Boyd (father) and Girtharae "Sweetie" (mother) in Meridian, Mississippi.

Boyd attended Meridian High School and Jackson State University.

== Major league career ==
=== 1982–1989: Boston Red Sox ===
Boyd was selected by the Boston Red Sox in the 16th round of the 1980 amateur draft, and made his debut in the 1982 season. A lanky frame at 6-foot-2, and weighing only 150 pounds, Boyd pitched 10 years in the majors before blood clots in his right arm ended his career.

From 1983 to 1985 Boyd won 31 games for Boston, with 15 victories in 1985. By the All-Star break in 1985, Boyd's record was 10–5 with a 3.19 ERA. By the end of that season, he posted career-highs in games started (35), complete games (13), strikeouts (154) and innings pitched (272.1). Boyd was the recipient of the 1985 Boston Red Sox Pitcher of the Year Award as selected by the Boston Baseball Writers Association.

In 1986, he won a career-high 16 games for the Sox. Boyd's record at the All-Star break was 11–6 with a 3.71 ERA. During the 1986 American League Championship Series, Boyd started two games against the California Angels, winning Game Six. Boyd started Game Three of the 1986 World Series against the New York Mets. In that game, Boyd gave up four runs in the first inning and six overall despite pitching into the seventh, getting only one run of support in taking the loss. He was scheduled to start the deciding seventh game of the series, but a rainout allowed Red Sox manager John McNamara to reconsider his pitching matchup for the game, and gave the nod to Bruce Hurst, who had gotten a third day of rest with the rainout. After Boyd received word he was not starting the final game of the series, he went down into the visitors' clubhouse and remained in there alone for some time. McNamara dispatched pitching coach Bill Fischer to find Boyd, and Fischer discovered that Boyd had consumed a great deal of alcohol and was in no condition to function, much less play. Fischer moved Boyd into the manager's office, locked the door, and left Boyd there for the duration of the game.

In 1987, Boyd alleged that an encounter with police caused a hairline fracture to his pitching arm that required surgery in August of that year. This limited him to seven games and a win–loss record of 1–3 during his shortened season.

Boyd's injuries contributed to a decline in games started and his win–loss records over his final two seasons with the Red Sox, 1988 and 1989, were 9–7 and 3–2 respectively.

=== 1990–1991: Montreal Expos ===
Boyd signed with the Expos as a free agent after the 1989 season and in 1990 he won 10 games for the Expos and compiled a 2.93 ERA.

When the Rangers acquired him from Montreal during the 1991 season, it looked like a deal that might lead to a division title, and though Boyd's work with the Expos before coming to Texas was not great (6–8, 3.52), it was good enough for the pitching-poor Rangers; however, in 12 starts he posted a 2–7 record with a 6.68 ERA (the highest of his career) and allowed 81 hits in only 62 innings. Boyd was a free agent when the season ended, and after turning down offers for relief duties, he retired.

=== 1992–2007: Later career ===
After MLB, Boyd played in Mexico for the Industriales of Monterrey and the Yucatán Leones in 1993 and 1994 respectively.

In 1995, Boyd reported to spring training as a replacement player for the Chicago White Sox during the 1994–95 Major League Baseball strike.

In 2005, Boyd came out of retirement at 45 years old to pitch for the Brockton Rox of the Can-Am League. He pitched in 17 games going 4 wins and 5 losses and a 3.83 ERA over 110 innings for the season. Boyd followed this with a 2007 barnstorming tour in the spirit of the Negro leagues under the team name of "Oil Can Boyd's Traveling All-Stars".

== Legacy ==
Boyd's issues, temperamental personality, and admitted drug use during his career have been well-documented.

Boyd was introduced to crack cocaine during spring training in 1986. He later admitted that, on May 11, 1986, prior to a game in Oakland, he smoked crack before taking the mound. In 2012, Boyd told Buster Olney of ESPN "I get to the ballpark, all the ballplayers are on the field, you know, taking batting practice and everything. And I walk in the clubhouse and I—I got my pipe with me ... I can remember going and locking myself up in the bathroom and smoking some dope right there at the ballpark."

Boyd was the cover story of the August 4, 1986 issue of Sports Illustrated. The article was titled "Banned [but needed] in Boston." Boyd's troubles in 1986 would climax during the seventh and deciding game of the 1986 World Series when he was unable to appear. Red Sox manager John McNamara and Red Sox pitching coach Bill Fischer later alleged that Boyd had been drinking and was too drunk to pitch during the game.

During 1987 spring training in Winter Haven, Florida, Boyd would be detained by police due to an issue concerning overdue video cassettes. When the list of titles made public turned out to contain pornographic titles, a Boston area newspaper printed the names and sarcastically dubbed the incident "The Can's Film Festival".

Boyd was inducted into the Southwestern Athletic Conference Hall of Fame in 2010.

In 2012, Boyd's autobiography, co-written by Boyd and Mike Shalin, They Call Me Oil Can: Baseball, Drugs, and Life on the Edge was published by Triumph Books. In the book, Boyd admitted that he used crack every day of the 1986 season and that he was high on marijuana in every baseball game he played from "Little League all the way through college."

Boyd's intense charisma during Red Sox games specifically was evidenced by fist pumps, shouting from the dugout, and high-fives for teammates. He was also a go-to player for quotes in the Boston press. Among his most well-known quotes is one made in reference to a game postponed at Cleveland's Municipal Stadium due to fog from Lake Erie. When asked about the situation, Boyd responded, "That's what you get for building a ballpark on the ocean."

== Personal life ==
Boyd has numerous relatives who played professional baseball. These include two of Boyd's uncles: K. T. Boyd played for Kansas City Monarchs, and Robert Boyd played for the Kansas City Athletics and the Memphis Red Sox of the Negro leagues. Boyd's great-great-uncle Benjamin Boyd played for Memphis Red Sox and the Homestead Grays. Boyd is also related to baseball player Barry Larkin, who is Boyd's father's first cousin (Boyd's first cousin once removed).
