= Bullens Field =

Multi-purpose stadium in Westfield, Massachusetts, U.S

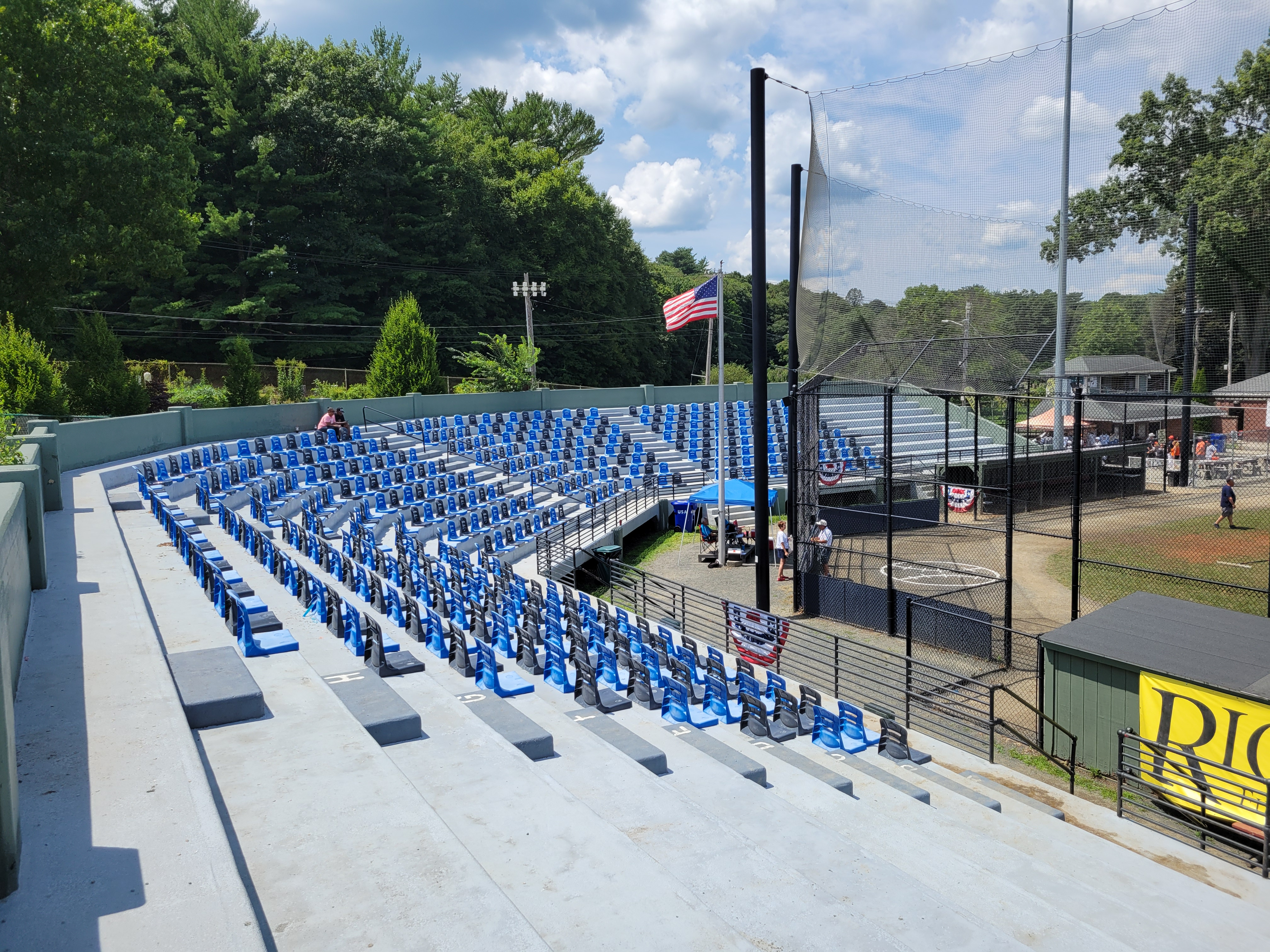
- Bullens Field grandstand

- Location within Massachusetts Location in the United States
- Interactive map of Bullens Field
- Full name: Billy Bullens Field
- Former names: Municipal Field
- Address: King Street; Westfield, Massachusetts
- Coordinates: 42°07′25″N 72°45′51″W
- Capacity: 1,000

Construction
- Built: 1937
- Opened: July 20, 1938
- Renovated: 2015

Tenants
- Westfield High School Bombers; Westfield Technical Academy Tigers; Westfield Starfires (FCBL) 2019–present

Billy Bullens Field is a multipurpose stadium in Westfield, Massachusetts. Bullens Field is the baseball and football home field for Westfield High School and Westfield Technical Academy. Bullens Field is also the home field for the Westfield Starfires of the Futures Collegiate Baseball League (FCBL).

Originally named Municipal Field, the stadium was built in 1937, and officially dedicated in 1938, as part of a larger project of ball fields, grandstands, a playground and tennis courts constructed by the Works Progress Administration (WPA). Billy Bullens was the assistant supervisor of the new facilities and in charge of the park maintenance for many years. The field was renamed for him in the early 1980s.

Bullens Field hosted the Babe Ruth 14-Year-Old World Series in 2016 and the Babe Ruth 13-Year-Old World Series in August 2019.
