= Hanover Insurance Park at Fitton Field =

Baseball stadium in Worcester, Massachusetts

Ballpark at Fitton Field
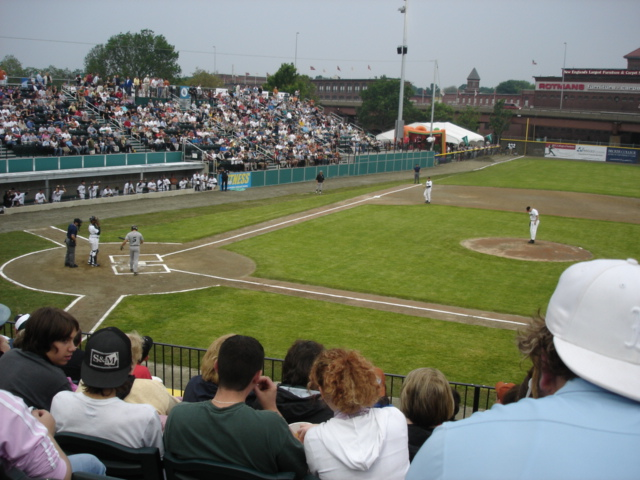
- View of the stadium in 2006

- Location within Massachusetts
- Former names: Hanover Insurance Park at Fitton Field (2005-2025); Fitton Field (1905–2005); Holy Cross Field (1903–1905)
- Location: Worcester, MA 01610
- Coordinates: 42°14′25.9″N 71°48′40.4″W
- Owner: College of the Holy Cross
- Operator: College of the Holy Cross
- Capacity: 3,000
- Type: Ballpark
- Surface: Grass
- Field size: Left field: 332 ft (101 m); Center field: 385 ft (117 m); Right field: 313 ft (95 m)
- Current use: Baseball

Construction
- Opened: September 26, 1903 (football); April 19, 1905 (baseball)
- Renovated: 2005

Tenants
- Holy Cross Crusaders (NCAA) 1903–present Worcester Tornadoes (Can-Am) 2005–2012; Worcester Bravehearts (FCBL) 2014–present

Website
- goholycross.com/fitton-field

Ballpark at Fitton Field is a baseball stadium in Worcester, Massachusetts. Primarily used for College of the Holy Cross sporting events, the baseball stadium also served as the home field for the Can-Am League Worcester Tornadoes, and the current home of the Futures Collegiate Baseball League Worcester Bravehearts. The stadium is named after the Reverend James Fitton, who donated land to the Archdiocese of Boston to found the college.

The baseball stadium lacks any outfield bleachers due to the proximity of Interstate 290 and the Fitton Field football stadium. Fitton Field hosted the MIAA High School Baseball State Finals in 2012 and has hosted them each year since 2014. During football season, the baseball field is used for parking and tailgating.

== History ==
Though Holy Cross had fielded varsity baseball and football teams for several years by the end of the 19th century, the teams lacked an on-campus stadium. They played their home games at the Worcester College Grounds, Worcester Driving Park Grounds and Worcester Oval.

In September 1903, the football team played the first intercollegiate game on the site of today's Ballpark at Fitton Field, then known simply as Holy Cross Field. Holy Cross beat Massachusetts Agricultural College – now UMass Amherst – by 6-0.

The baseball team began playing at this facility in 1905, with their first game coinciding with the dedication of the facility as Fitton Field. Baseball and football continued to share the stadium until 1908, when a separate football stadium, also known as Fitton Field, was built beyond right-field.

The two adjacent stadiums were known by the same name until 2005, when the baseball field was renovated to accommodate the Worcester Tornadoes. The renamed Hanover Insurance Park featured upgraded seating and lighting, and a capacity of approximately 3,000 spectators.

== Famous uses ==
Lou Gehrig played a game at Fitton Field in 1922 as a sophomore for Columbia University. Babe Ruth played at Fitton Field for the Boston Braves in a 1935 exhibition game against Holy Cross. In a 1939 exhibition game between Holy Cross and the Boston Red Sox, Ted Williams hit his first home run in a Red Sox uniform. Satchel Paige played in a 1942 benefit game for the Disabled American Veterans between the Kansas City Monarchs and a team of Worcester all-stars. In 2006, Fitton Field hosted the 100 Inning Game benefit for Curt Schilling's charity, Curt's Pitch for ALS.

== See also ==
- List of NCAA Division I baseball venues
