= Campanelli Stadium =

Stadium in Brockton, Massachusetts, US

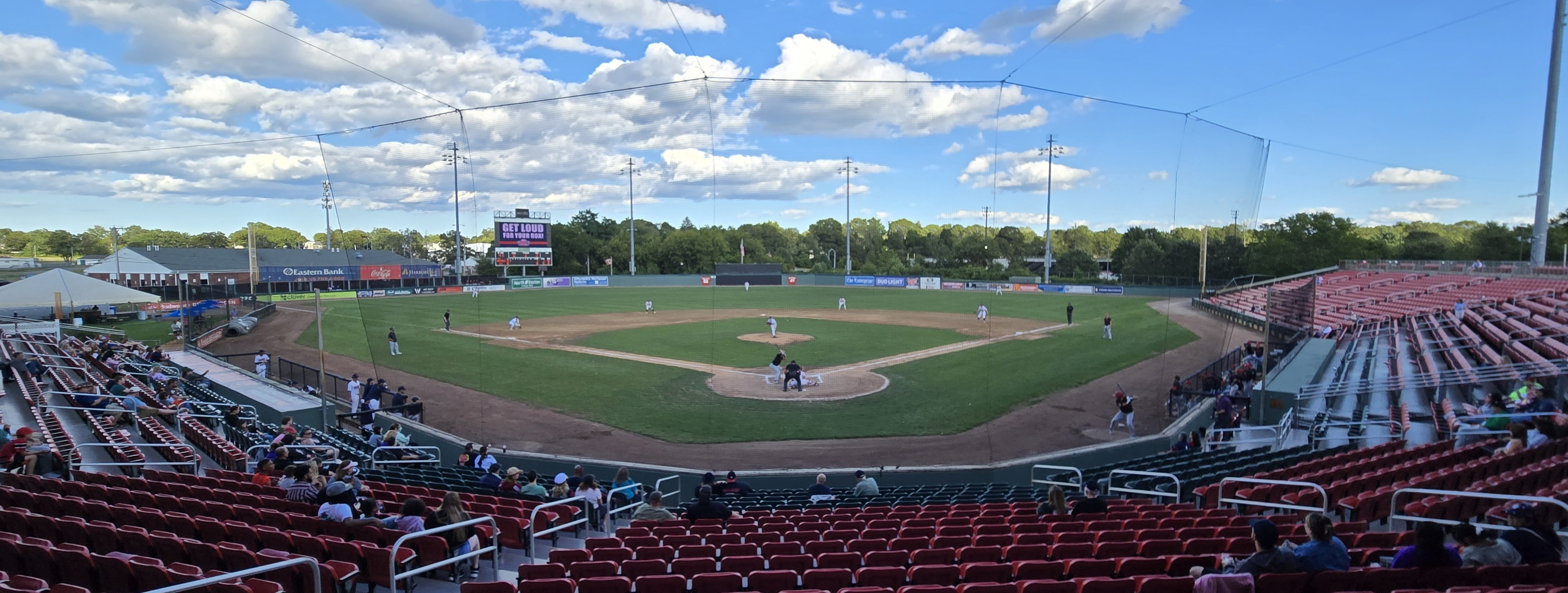

- Location within Massachusetts Location within the United States
- Interactive map of Campanelli Stadium
- Address: 1 Feinberg Way; Brockton, MA 02301
- Coordinates: 42°04′09.61″N 71°02′33.69″W
- Operator: Brockton Rox
- Capacity: 6,000 (2002–2006); 4,750 (2006–present)
- Field size: Left field: 320 ft (98 m); Center field: 403 ft (123 m); Right field: 320 ft (98 m)

Construction
- Built: 2002
- Opened: 2002
- Renovated: 2006, 2022

Tenants
- Brockton Rox (Northern League) 2002; Brockton Rox (Northeast League) 2003–2004; Brockton Rox (Can-Am League) 2005–2011; Brockton Rox (FCBL) 2012–2024; New England Knockouts (FL) 2024; Brockton Rox (NAPB) 2025–present

Campanelli Stadium is a baseball stadium in Brockton, Massachusetts. It is home to the Brockton Rox, playing in the National Association of Professional Baseball (NAPB). The stadium opened in 2002 and has a capacity of 4,750 seats.

== History ==
The stadium was officially named after Alfred Campanelli, a suburban housing mogul born in Brockton, who donated $2 million to fund a project that would "substantially benefit the people of Brockton."

The Brockton Rox were the stadium's main tenant for two decades. The team used the facility for home games starting in 2002, competing in three different professional leagues through the 2011 season. From 2012 through 2024, the team competed in the amateur Futures Collegiate Baseball League (FCBL). The Rox held various family-friendly actives at the park (such as face-painting or fireworks) before or after select games during their season.

The New England Knockouts, a franchise in the Frontier League (FL), a Major League Baseball (MLB) Partner League, began play in the 2024 season using the stadium as their home ballpark. The Knockouts played their first game at the stadium on May 10, defeating the Ottawa Titans 6–4. On January 29, 2025, the Knockouts were rebranded as the Brockton Rox, signifying the end of the tenure in the FCBL of the like-named amateur team.

In 2005, Campanelli Stadium hosted the 100 Inning Game benefit for Curt Schilling's charity, Curt's Pitch for ALS. In 2014, Campanelli Stadium began hosting several of the inaugural MIAA "Super Eight" baseball games. Other sporting contests held at the venue include Brockton High School baseball games, select Boston College Eagles baseball games, and the Baseball Beanpot, contested between Boston College, UMass Amherst, Northeastern, and Harvard.

The venue has been used for medium- to large-scale concerts and other events. Major music acts such as Jack Johnson, NOFX, Willie Nelson, Bob Dylan, and The B-52s have played at Campanelli. Other events, including The Jonas Brothers' Roadogs Softball Game, and Kevin Faulk Celebrity Softball Game, have been held at the facility. The stadium also hosts small-scale events, such as Boy Scout overnights.

The stadium has had some issues, including a raccoon infestation during 2019. Brockton's superintendent of buildings stated during the peak of the problem, "Maybe we should change the mascot to the Brockton raccoons." However, this issue was eventually resolved.

Free automobile parking during games is available at adjacent Brockton High School. The Brockton Area Transit Authority (BATA) provides bus transportation to the stadium. The rail station nearest to the stadium, Brockton station of the MBTA Commuter Rail, is located approximately 1.7 miles (2.7 km) northeast, but is next to the BAT Centre, the primary hub for BATA.
