= Matt Fincher =

American college baseball coach and player

Biographical details
- Born: Atlanta, Georgia, U.S.

Playing career
- 1980–1981: Wofford College
- 1982–1983: Georgia College
- Position: Catcher

Coaching career (HC unless noted)
- 1985: Eastern Illinois (graduate assistant)
- 1986–1990: Georgia C&S (assistant)
- 1994–1996: Georgia (assistant)
- 1997: Andrew (interim HC)
- 1997–2006: Chatham Anglers (assistant)
- 1998–2019: USC Upstate

Head coaching record
- Overall: 503–701
- Tournaments: ASUN: 0–2; Big South: 0–1; NCAA: 0–0

Accomplishments and honors

Awards
- ASUN Coach of the Year (2012)

Matt Fincher is an American former college baseball coach and player who is the manager of the Vermont Lake Monsters of the Futures Collegiate Baseball League. He served as head coach of the USC Upstate Spartans baseball program from 1998 until 2019. From 1997 to 2006, he was assistant coach of the Chatham Anglers of the Cape Cod Baseball League. His uniform number "23" was retired by Chatham in 2006. He hails from Athens, Georgia. On May 31, 2019, Fincher stepped down as the head coach at USC Upstate.

== Head coaching record ==
Record table
Season	Team	Overall	Conference	Standing	Postseason
USC Spartanburg/Upstate Spartans (Peach Belt Conference) (1998–2006)
1998	USC Spartanburg	13–40	5–24	11th	
1999	USC Spartanburg	21–33	5–25	11th	
2000	USC Spartanburg	13–40	6–24	10th	
2001	USC Spartanburg	12–42	4–26	11th	
2002	USC Spartanburg	21–34	5–24	11th	
2003	USC Spartanburg	28–26	9–18	11th	
2004	USC Spartanburg	24–28	11–19	10th	
2005	USC Upstate	33–21	14–16	7th	
2006	USC Upstate	33–24	13–14	6th	
2007	USC Upstate	34–25	15–15	5th	
USC Upstate Spartans (ASUN Conference) (2007–2018)
2008	USC Upstate	25–29	17–16	6th	ineligible
2009	USC Upstate	17–37	7–23	11th	ineligible
2010	USC Upstate	19–37	8–19	11th	ineligible
2011	USC Upstate	19–36	10–18	9th	
2012	USC Upstate	39–24	16–10	2nd	Atlantic Sun Tournament
2013	USC Upstate	28–30	9–18	8th	
2014	USC Upstate	17–38	6–20	9th	
2015	USC Upstate	15–38	4–17	8th	
2016	USC Upstate	22–30	5–15	8th	
2017	USC Upstate	24–31	7–14	7th	
2018	USC Upstate	23–28	5–14	8th	
USC Upstate Spartans (Big South Conference) (2019)
2019	USC Upstate	23–30	9–17	8th	Big South Tournament
USC Spartanburg/Upstate:		503–701	190–406		
Total:		503–701			
National champion Postseason invitational champion Conference regular season champion Conference regular season and conference tournament champion Division regular season champion Division regular season and conference tournament champion Conference tournament champion
