= Leary Field =

Baseball park in Portsmouth, New Hampshire

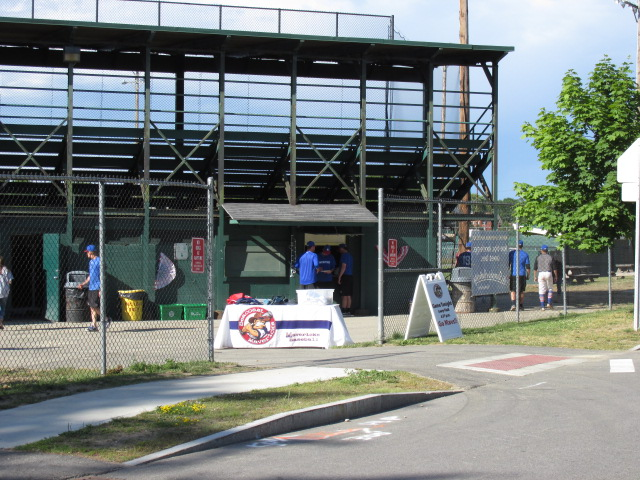
- Interactive map of Leary Field
- Location: Rockland Street, Portsmouth, New Hampshire, USA
- Coordinates: 43.0710773°N 70.7581514°W
- Field size: 290 feet (LF), 367 feet (CF), 286 feet (RF)

Construction
- Renovated: 2013

Tenant
- Seacoast Mavericks (FCBL) (2013-2017)

Leary Field is a baseball park in Portsmouth, New Hampshire, adjacent to the South Playground. Local American Legion teams play there. It was the home of the Seacoast Mavericks, a summer team of the Futures Collegiate Baseball League, occasionally in 2012 and continuously from 2013 through 2017.

== Layout ==
Leary Field has a covered wooden grandstand (pictured), aluminum seating on the third base side, and picnic space and accommodation for spectators in lawn chairs on the first base side. Beneath the grandstand is a concrete-block building housing toilets and food-service facilities. These open away from the field, behind the grandstand.

Spectator gates are off Rockland Street, behind the grandstand; and across from the Portsmouth Library, beyond left field.

The baseball surface is natural grass. Players have access to covered dugouts and on-field bullpens on each side of the field. Right field is notoriously short, and it is relatively easy to hit home runs over the chain-link fence that reach the dogwalk and tennis courts beyond right field. The prevailing west wind boosts balls hit to right field.

== History ==
The ballpark was originally named "South Playground". It was home to the Portsmouth Baseball Club and the Atlantic Corporation in the late 1800s. In 1956, it was renamed Leary Field, after Portsmouth Mayor John J. Leary. The adjacent tennis and basketball courts are still called South Playground.

== Seacoast Mavericks ==
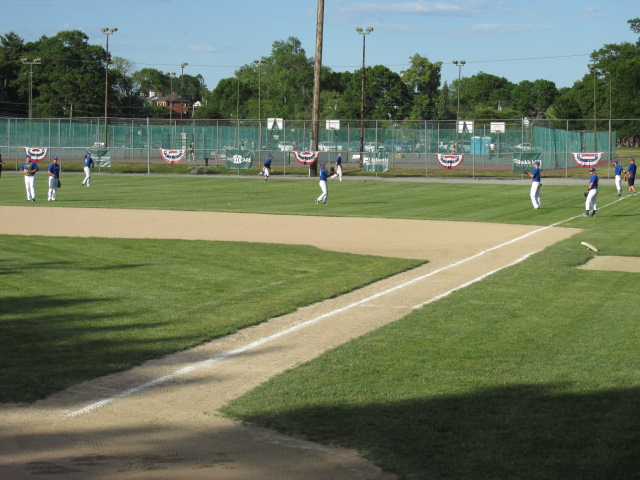
The notoriously small right field. Flies hit further than 286 feet reach the dogwalk or tennis courts.

The Seacoast Mavericks played six home games of the 2012 season at Leary Field, observing that attendance was roughly double that of its home in Rochester, New Hampshire. In 2013, the Mavericks moved to Leary, improved the dugouts, and installed new on-field bullpens.

At the end of the 2017 season, Mavericks owner Dave Hoyt declared that the Mavericks would not return to Leary Field in 2018, citing "small [field] dimensions and small crowds," though a planned sports complex in Dover, New Hampshire, would not be ready by 2018.

== Other uses ==
Local American Legion teams play at Leary Field. The field is also the site of the Portsmouth fireworks to commemorate the Fourth of July (a celebration always held on July 3).

There are athletic fields also named Leary Field in Waltham, Massachusetts.
