= Norwich Sea Unicorns =

American minor league baseball team

- Logo

Information
- League: FCBL (2021–present)
- Location: Norwich, Connecticut (2010–present)
- Ballpark: Senator Thomas J. Dodd Memorial Stadium (2010–present)
- Founded: 2010
- League championships: FCBL: 2023, 2024, 2025
- Former name: Connecticut Tigers (2010–2019)
- Former league: New York–Penn League (2010–2020)
- Colors: Navy, yellow, gold, gray, blue, white
- Ownership: Miles Prentice
- General manager: Lee Walter Jr.
- Manager: Kyle Dembrowski
- Website: goseaunicorns.com

The Norwich Sea Unicorns are a baseball team located in Norwich, Connecticut. From 2010 to 2020, they were members of Minor League Baseball's New York–Penn League (NYPL) as the Class A Short Season affiliate of the Detroit Tigers. They play their home games at Senator Thomas J. Dodd Memorial Stadium. They were previously known as the Connecticut Tigers from 2010 to 2019. With Major League Baseball's reorganization of the minor leagues after the 2020 season, Norwich was not selected to continue in affiliated baseball. Starting with the 2021 season, Norwich plays in the Futures Collegiate Baseball League.

== History ==
The unveiling of the team's original logo and uniforms at an April 1, 2010, press conference

On January 27, 2010, Oneonta, New York Mayor Dick Miller announced in a press release that the Oneonta Tigers would be leaving the city for Norwich, Connecticut, after the 2009 season. Beginning play in 2010, the Connecticut Tigers played their games in the newly renovated Dodd Stadium, which had been vacated by the Connecticut Defenders of the Eastern League who had left for Richmond, Virginia, to become the Richmond Flying Squirrels simultaneous to the Tigers' arrival.

In 2011, the Connecticut Tigers saw a 23% increase in total attendance and a 20% increase in average attendance over 2010 numbers. The 20% increase in average attendance was the fourth largest increase in all of Minor League Baseball.

The Connecticut Tigers name was only expected to be used for the 2010 season with a name-the-team contest expected to be held after the season to decide a permanent name. The team decided to keep the name, however, citing positive feedback from fans owing to the connection to the major league Detroit Tigers, the team's Major League Baseball affiliate. Connecticut held on to the Tigers moniker through the end of the 2019 season. That season, the team renewed its long-term lease with the city of Norwich, and, as a result, announced a change to the team name, which would include the Norwich name and a nickname to be chosen following a fan submission contest. The five finalists from the contest were "Norwich Golden Roses", "Norwich Mill Mules", "Norwich Narwals", "Norwich Salty Dogs", and "Norwich Sea Unicorns". Ultimately, the team settled on becoming the Norwich Sea Unicorns.

The start of the 2020 season was postponed due to the COVID-19 pandemic before being cancelled on June 30. After the cancelled 2020 minor league season, Major League Baseball took direct control of Minor League Baseball and discontinued short-season play. The Sea Unicorns were not selected to continue in affiliated baseball. The team joined the Futures Collegiate Baseball League (FCBL), a collegiate summer league in New England, for 2021.

== Playoffs ==
- 2014 NY-Penn League Playoffs - Lost to Tri-City 2–0 in semifinals.
- 2023 FCBL Playoffs - Defeated the New Britain Bees 2-1 in semifinals. Defeated the Vermont Lake Monsters in the championship game.
- 2024 FCBL Playoffs - Defeated the Vermont Lake Monsters 2 games to 1 in the best-of-3 semifinals. Defeated the Westfield Starfires 2 games to none in the best-of-3 championship series.
- 2025 FCBL Playoffs - Defeated the Worcester Bravehearts 2 games to none in the best-of-3 semifinals. Defeated the New Britain Bees 2 games to 1 in the best-of-3 championship series.

== Roster ==
Norwich Sea Unicorns Roster
Active Roster	Coaching Staff
Pitchers: TBD; Catchers: TBD; Infielders: TBD; Outfielders: TBD	Manager: -- Kyle Dembrowski; Coaches: TBD; Disabled list; ‡ Inactive list; >§ Suspended list; Roster updated April 30, 2025

== See also ==
- Professional baseball in Connecticut
