= Mike Shalin =

American sportswriter and author (1954–2020)

Mike Shalin (1954 - December 4, 2020) was a sportswriter known for covering the New York Yankees and the Boston Red Sox from 1980 to 2005, and being the Red Sox official scorer at Fenway Park from 2005 until his death. He was 66.

Shalin wrote for both the New York Post in the 1980s and the Boston Herald from 1983 to 1995, bridging "the New York/Boston divide." Before writing for the New York Post, Shalin wrote for United Press International in the 1970s. His first sports writing involved covering hockey games. He wrote Tales from the New York Rangers Locker Room about the experience in 2016. Shalin wrote a regular column for the New Hampshire Union Leader called Working Press on Sundays and weekdays.

Shalin was an eligible voter at the Baseball Hall of Fame. He wrote a book with his brother Neil about players they believed should have been in the Hall of Fame but weren't called Out by a Step: The 100 Best Players Not in the Baseball Hall of Fame.

== Personal life ==
Shalin was married to his wife Mary and the couple had three sons.

== Bibliography ==
- Mo Vaughn: Angel on a Mission (1999) ISBN 9781582610467
- Drew Bledsoe: Patriot Rifle (1999) ISBN 9780585359878
- Nomar Garciaparra: High 5! (1999) ISBN 9780585048406
- Pedro Martinez: throwing strikes (1999) ISBN 9781582610474
- Out by a Step: The 100 Best Players Not in the Baseball Hall of Fame (2002) ISBN 9781888698442
- Donnie Baseball: The Definitive Biography of Don Mattingly (2011) ISBN 9781600785368
- They Call Me Oil Can: Baseball, Drugs, and Life on the Edge (2012) ISBN 9781600786822
- Alex Rodriguez: A+ Shortstop (2012) ISBN 9781613212493
- Tales from the New York Rangers Locker Room: A Collection of The Greatest Rangers Stories Ever Told (2016, with Gilles Villemure) ISBN 9781613219034
- The Hometown Team: Four Decades of Boston Red Sox Photography (2018) ISBN 9781683580942
