= Wachusett Dirt Dawgs =

- [[File: Team Logo|frameless|class=pageimage|alt=]] Logo

Information
- League: FCBL (West Division)
- Location: Leominster, Massachusetts (2011-2017)
- Ballpark: Doyle Field (2011-2017)
- Founded: 2011
- Folded: 2017
- Colors: Red, White, Blue
- Mascot: Digger
- Ownership: John Morrison
- Manager: Dan Generelli
- Website: dirtdawgsball.com

The Wachusett Dirt Dawgs were a collegiate summer baseball team playing in the Futures Collegiate Baseball League of New England based in Leominster, Massachusetts. They played their home games at Historic Doyle Field in Leominster, Mass. 2012–2017. They were an expansion team for the FCBL and played their inaugural season in 2012.

== Team history ==
=== Team's inception ===
Futures Collegiate Baseball League Commissioner, Chris Hall, announced on June 19, 2011, that the Wachusett Dirt Dawgs will be added as the league's fifth franchise located in Leominster, Mass. The organization will be operated by local businessman, John Morrison, President of privately held polymer lens manufacturer, Fosta-Tek Optics. Fosta-Tek employs more than 150 people and has been an integral part of the greater Leominster business community for 20 years.

=== 2012 ===
The Wachusett Dirt Dawgs started their first year in the FCBL on the wrong foot, after falling in the team's first ever game 11–6 to the Torrington Titans, the Dirt Dawgs had a surprise in their home opener at Doyle Field. Besides falling to the Pittsfield Suns 13–5, the game was delayed for an hour because the sprinkler system turned on. The team eventually got their first franchise win on June 12, 2012, as Wachusett used a three-run third inning to propel themselves to a 4–3 win over the Old Orchard Beach Raging Tide. The team as a whole struggled, finishing the first season with a 9–42 record.. One highlight for the Dirt Dawgs was that in the 2012 season, Dirt Dawgs pitcher Ty Sterner was the first Dirt Dawgs to be drafted by a Major League team. Sterner was drafted out of the University of Rhode Island in the 2014 draft by the Cincinnati Reds in the 23rd round.

=== 2013 ===
In their second season in the league, the Dirt Dawgs started on the right foot, as the team won their opening game against the Torrington Titans 7–4. From July 11 to 14, Wachusett set a team record for most consecutive wins with five. As a whole the 2013 season was not a wash, but it was a stepping stone for the future. The team finished with a 20–31 record, with an 11-game improvement from their first year.

=== 2014 ===
The third year was a record breaking season for the Wachusett Ball Club, as the team broke numerous records, for both the team and for the league. For starter two players on the 2014 squad (Mattingly Romanin and Richard Fecteau) went on to get drafted by an MLB team in future drafts. Their offense set multiple league records that season, including homeruns (69), RBIs (281). Individually, Mike Corin (Rhode Island) set a team record for homeruns (14), total bases (109), and RBIs (42). Fellow right hander, Joe Breen (Southern Conn.) set the high mark for a 15-game hitting streak (June 20 to July 8, 2014) where he was 29 for 65 (.446) raising his batting average to .412. Breen also showed his power as he set the record for the most road homeruns (5) and the highest slugging percentage. Unfortunately, the team fell one game shy of making the playoffs with a 26–29 record.

=== 2015 ===
The team took a step back in 2015 as they finished the season with a 22-30 overall record. The Dirt Dawgs struggled to keep pace with the power numbers of the 2014 team, as the offense combine to hit 36 homeruns, a little over half from the previous season. One of their strengths was their closer, as Matt Cronin (UMass Dartmouth) was the anchor of the pitching staff. The hard throwing righty set a team record with seven saves on the season while sporting a 1.78 ERA in 30.1 innings.

=== 2016 ===
In the Dirt Dawgs 5th season in the league, the team picked up their fourth consecutive 20+ win season, after finishing 21–34. The 2016 campaign featured a few record being broken, as Ryan Lever (UMass Amherst) set the record for triples, with three, while Kyle Bonicki (Clark) set the league record for hits in a season (76), while holding the team titles in batting average (.403) and on-base percentage (.472). Outfielder Sean Webster (SNHU) swiped a team record 21 bases over the season. Ryne Ogron (Elon) was named the FCBL Defensive Player of the Year in 2016, after finishing the season with a .979 fielding percentage over 52 games.

=== 2017 ===
After struggling in their first years of existence, the Wachusett Dirt Dawgs made major strides in their sixth season. They broke multiple records, including their first winning season and a team record 29 wins in 2017. Individually, Zack Tower (Franklin Pierce) re-wrote the Dirt Dawgs offensive record books, as the fourth year player in the FCBL set the league record for career homeruns, and a team record 18 longballs, 10 on the road and 50 RBI's. Out of the bullpen, both Willie Krajnik (Saint Peter's) and Jon Gegetskas (Westfield State) tied the team record with 5 wins on the season, while Mike Demarest (Adelphi) appeared in 21 games and had a 0.75 ERA, both team records. The team had a stretch that they won 15 of 16 games in the middle to late June, giving them enough recognition to be ranked #20 in the Collegiate Summer Baseball national rankings. The team reached the FCBL playoffs for the first time in franchise history after clinching the #3 seed in the playoffs, but their playoff stint was a short one, as they lost to the Worcester Bravehearts 9–2 in the first round.

=== 2018 ===
Wachusett Dirt Dawgs sat out the 2018 and 2019 seasons as the city of Leominster terminated their lease at Doyle Field.

== Year-by-year ==
Year	Wins	Loss	Win percentage	Points
2017	29*	24	0.547*	58*
2016	21	34	0.382	42
2015	22	30	0.423	44
2014	26	29	0.473	52
2013	20	31	0.392	40
2012	9	42*	0.176	18

*=Team Highs

== Team records ==
Individual	Name	School	Record	Year
Batting Average	Kyle Bonicki	Clark	.403	2016
Hits	Kyle Bonicki	Clark	75	2016
Hitting Streak	Joe Breen	Southern Conn.	15	2014
Doubles	Josh Raymond	Judson	14	2013
Triples	Ryan Lever	UMass Amherst	3	2016
Homeruns	Zack Tower	Franklin Pierce	18	2017
Road Homeruns	Zack Tower	Franklin Pierce	10	2017
Runs Batted In	Zack Tower	Franklin Pierce	50	2017
Walks	Jamill Moquette	UMass Boston	25	2013
Stolen Bases	Sean Webster	SNHU	21	2016
Strikeouts	Zack Tower	Franklin Pierce	56	2017
Individual Pitching
Appearances	Mike Demarest	Adelphi	21	2017
Innings	Edward Baram	Adelphi	58.1	2017
Wins	Willie Krajnik Jon Gegetskas Mike Lundin	St. Peter's Westfield State Franklin Pierce	5	2017 2017 2014
ERA	Mike Demarest	Adelphi	0.75	2017
Strikeouts	Mike Lundin	Franklin Pierce	63	2014
Saves	Matt Cronin	UMass Dartmouth	7	2015
Losses	Jeff Anderson	Adelphi	11	2012
Team Offense
Wins	29			2017
Losses	42			2011
Winning Streak	7 Games, 6/12-6/21			2017
Wins in June	15			2017
Wins in July	13			2014
Wins in August	5			2013
Homerun Derby Wins	3			2017
Runs	357			2017
RBIs	310			2017
Batting Average	.284			2017
Hits	527			2016
Doubles	83			2017
Triples	10			2014
Homeruns	70			2017
Stolen Bases	103			2017
Walks	223			2017
Runs in a Game	18 at Worcester Bravehearts 7/23 (18-8 Win)			2017
Team Pitching
Wins	27			2017
Losses	42			2012
Saves	12			2015
Complete Games	3			2015
Shutouts	5			2015
Strikeouts	476			2017
ERA	4.08			2015

== Coaches ==
Coaches	Years	Record	Win percentage
Dan Generelli	2016-2017	50-58	0.463
Dave Gage	2015	27-29	0.482
Kevin Barnaby	2014	26-29	0.473
Nick Barese	2012-2013	24-53	0.312
Mike Greene	2012	5-20	0.200

== Drafted players ==
- Joe Cronin (Boston College) Drafted by the Minnesota Twins in the 34th round of the 2016 MLB June Amateur Draft.
- Richard Fecteau (Salem State) Drafted by the Los Angeles Angels of Anaheim in the 39th round of the 2016 MLB June Amateur Draft
- Ben Libuda (Worcester State) Drafted by the Atlanta Braves in the 26th round of the 2015 MLB June Amateur Draft
- Scott Manea (Florida International) Drafted by the Seattle Mariners in the 40th round of the 2014 MLB June Amateur Draft and Signed by the New York Mets July 21, 2016
- Jamill Moquette (UMass Boston) Drafted by the Baltimore Orioles in the 32nd round of the 2014 MLB June Amateur Draft
- Joe Napolitano (Wake Forest) Signed by the New York Mets June 27, 2016
- Mattingly Romanin (Chicago State) Drafted by the Toronto Blue Jays in the 39th round of the 2015 MLB June Amateur Draft
- Ty Sterner (Rhode Island) Drafted by the Cincinnati Reds in the 23rd round of the 2014 MLB June Amateur Draft
- Will Stillman (Wofford) Drafted by the Boston Red Sox in the 29th round of the 2015 MLB June Amateur Draft and the San Diego Padres in the 6th round of the 2016 MLB June Amateur Draft. Released May 2018.
- Ryne Ogren (Elon) Drafted by the Seattle Mariners in the 12th round of the 2018 MLB draft, receiving a $125,000 signing bonus.
- Jake Alu(Boston College), 2015 Dirt Dawg was drafted by the Nationals in the 24th round of the 2019 MLB draft.
- Ed Baram (Adelphi), 2017 Dirt Dawg was drafted by the Oakland A's in the 30th round of the 2019 MLB draft.

In January 2019 Manea was acquired by the Astros as part of a 5 player transaction with the Mets.

In April 2019 Seattle traded Ogren to the Orioles for RHP Mike Wright who made 48 appearances for the Orioles in 2018.

2019 Still Active /Level: Cronin (AA Twins), Manea (A Houston), Ogren (A Orioles), Jake Alu, Ed Baram

2022 Still Active: Ryne Ogren announced voluntary retirement from Orioles, leaving Manea (AAA Houston), Baram (High A A's), David Griffin (High A Mets) Alu (AA Senators)

== FCBL players in AAA or higher ==
- Tyler Bashlor (AAA/Mets) Drafted by the New York Mets in the 11th round of the 2013 MLB June Amateur Draft from South Georgia College (Douglas, Georgia), played for the Torrington Titans in 2012. Bashlor made it to the Bigs in 2018, making 24 appearances for the Mets
- Matt Gage (MLB/ Astros & Blue Jays) Drafted by the San Francisco Giants in the 10th round of the 2014 MLB June Amateur Draft from Siena College (Loudonville, New York), Played for the Pittsfield Suns in 2012.
- Chris Shaw (AAA/Giants) Drafted by the New York Mets in the 26th round of the 2012 MLB June Amateur Draft from Lexington HS (Lexington, Massachusetts) and the San Francisco Giants in the 1st round (31st) of the 2015 MLB June Amateur Draft from Boston College (Chestnut Hill, Massachusetts), played for the Nashua Silver Knights in 2012. Shaw joined the Giants in 2018 appearing in 22 games with a .185 average.
- Ruben Sosa (AAA) Selected by the Houston Astros in the 23rd round of the 2011 First-Year Player Draft out of Oklahoma City University, played for the Seacoast Mavericks in 2011.
- Andrew Velazquez (AAA/Rays) Drafted by the Arizona Diamondbacks in the 7th round of the 2012 MLB June Amateur Draft from Fordham Prep HS (New York, New York), played for the Pittsfield Sun in 2012. Velazquez joined the Rays for 13 games in 2018.
- Jason Vosler (AAA) Drafted by the Chicago Cubs in the 16th round of the 2014 MLB June Amateur Draft from Northeastern University (Boston, Massachusetts), played for the Old Orhard Beach Raging Tide in 2012.

== Postseason appearances ==
=== FCBL ===
==== 2017 ====
- vs. Worcester Bravehearts (L) 2-9 Loss

=== Playoff format ===
- *The FCBL changed its postseason to a two-round format starting in the 2012 season
- ** A one-game Play-In round was added in the 2013 season

== FCBL yearly awards ==
=== 2017 ===
- Zack Tower (Franklin Pierce) - MVP
- All-Stars
  - Andrew Bene (Shippensburg)
  - Mike Demarest (Adephi)
  - Jon Gegetskas (Westfield St.)
  - Jack Gethings (Fairfield)
  - Eddie Santiago (Mitchell)
  - Joe Simeone (UConn)
  - Zack Tower (Franklin Pierce)

=== 2016 ===
- Ryan Ogren (Elon) - Defensive Player of the Year
- Kyle Bonicki (Clark) - All-FCBL First Team
- Joe Cronin (Boston College) Drafted by the Minnesota Twins in the 34th round (1023rd overall)
- Richard Fecteau (Salem State) Drafted by the Los Angeles Angels of Anaheim in the 39th round (1176th overall)
- Will Stillman (Wofford) Drafted by the San Diego Padres in the 6th round (174th overall)
- All-Stars
  - Kyle Bonicki (Clark)
  - Scott Manea (Florida International)

=== 2015 ===
- Chris Chirardio (Seton Hall) - All-FCBL Second Team
- Justin Silvestro (Wheaton) - All-FCBL Second Team
- Jon Kristofferson (Saint Peter's) - All-FCBL Second Team
- Max DiTondo (Franklin Pierce) - All-FCBL Second Team
- Steve Colella (UMass Dartmouth) - All-FCBL Second Team
- Matt Cronin (UMass Dartmouth - All-FCBL Second Team
- Ben Libuda (Worcester State) Drafted by the Atlanta Braves in the 26th round (780th overall)
- Mattingly Romanin (Chicago State) Drafted by the Toronto Blue Jays in the 39th round (1172nd overall)
- All-Stars
  - Kurtis White (Franklin Pierce)
  - Max DiTando (Franklin Pierce)
  - Chris Stanford (Franklin Pierce)
  - Chris Chirardio (Seton Hall)
  - Jon Kristoffersen (Saint Peter's)
  - Matt Cronin (UMass Dartmouth)

=== 2014 ===
- Ty Sterner (Rhode Island) Drafted by the Cincinnati Reds in the 23rd round (695th overall)
- Jamill Moquete (UMass Boston) Drafted by the Baltimore Orioles in 32nd round (961st overall)
- Scott Manea (Florida International) Drafted by the Seattle Mariners in the 40th round (1191st overall)
- All-Stars
  - Joe Breen (Southern Connecticut)
  - Mike Corin (Rhode Island)
  - Mattingly Romanin (Chicago State)
  - Mike Lundin (Franklin Pierce)
  - Richard Fecteau (Salem State)

=== 2013 ===
- Jamill Moquete (UMass Boston) - All-FCBL First Team
- Josh Raymond (Judson) - All-FCBL First Team
- All-Stars
  - Jamill Moquete (UMass Boston)
  - Josh Raymond (Judson)
  - Michael Yerina (Southern Connecticut)
  - Derek Lowe (William & Mary)

=== 2012 ===
- All-Stars
  - Shane Keddy (Assumption)
  - Bryan Menduke (Bryant)
