= Westfield Technical Academy =

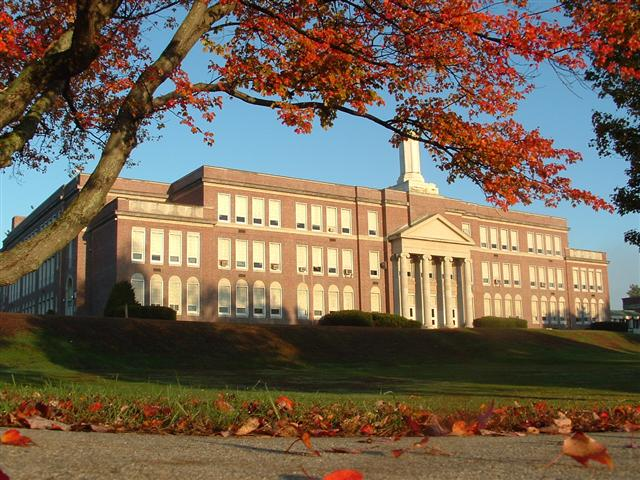
- The upper campus of Westfield Technical Academy, where the cupola at the center of the school logo can be seen.

Location
- 33 Smith Ave; Westfield, Massachusetts 01085; United States; 42°07′31″N 72°45′42″W

Information
- School type: Public, Career Technical Education High School
- Motto: We Put Education To Work
- Established: July 1911; October 1, 1911 (opened)
- Principal: Bruce Hastings
- Grades: 9–12
- Enrollment: 543 (2022-23)
- Student to teacher ratio: 9:1
- Colors: Purple and Gold
- Mascot: Tiger
- Website: https://www.schoolsofwestfield.org/o/westfield-tech

Westfield Technical Academy (formerly known as Westfield Vocational Technical High School) is a technical, coeducational, four-year public high school, part of the Westfield Public Schools district in Westfield, Massachusetts, United States. The school opened as the Westfield Independent Industrial School on October 1, 1911.

== School name history ==
- Westfield Independent Industrial School; Westfield Day Industrial School for Boys; Westfield Evening Trade/Industrial School (1911-1917)
- Westfield Boys Trade School (1917-1950)
- Westfield Trade High School (1950-1969)
- Westfield Vocational High School (1969-1994)
- Westfield Vocational Technical High School (1994-2015)
- Westfield Technical Academy (2015–present)

== List of principals ==
- 1911: William C. Shute
- 1911-1919: Burton A. Prince
- 1919-1950: Chester C. Derby
- 1950-1952: Leonard H. Scott
- 1952-1957: Vincent P. Kramer
- 1957-1976: Michael Gonzalez
- 1976-1984: Arthur A. Peters
- 1984-1989: Alfred R. Rios
- 1989-2006: Steven E. Pippin
- 2006-2012: Hilary Weisgerber
- 2012-2016: Stefan Czaporowski
- 2016-2022: Joseph F. Langone
- 2022-2023 (acting); 2023-Present: Bruce Hastings

== Past school locations ==
- Broad Street, Westfield, Massachusetts 01085 (1911-1917)
- 25 Bartlett Street, Westfield, Massachusetts 01085 (1917-1962)
- 33 Smith Avenue, Westfield, Massachusetts 01085 (1962–present)

== Technical programs ==
Westfield Technical Academy currently offers career-technical training in twelve programs:

- Allied Health
- Arts and Communication (1994–Present)
- Automotive Technology
- Aviation Technology (2015–Present)
- Business Technology (1994–Present)
- Collision Technology (1994–Present)
- Construction Technology
- Culinary Arts
- Electrical Wiring
- Horticulture Technology (1994–Present)
- Information Technology
- Manufacturing Technology (1911–Present)

=== Former technical programs ===
- HVAC/R Technology (1994-2008), discontinued due to low enrollment. The room which was for HVAC/R Technology (on the upper campus) is now part of Electrical Wiring.

== Sports ==
- Soccer (Boys Varsity/Junior Varsity, Girls Varsity)
- Baseball (Boys Varsity/Junior Varsity)
- Basketball (Boys Varsity/Junior Varsity, Girls Varsity)
- Golf (Boys/Girls Varsity)
- Softball (Girls Varsity)
- Cross Country (Boys/Girls Varsity)

=== Notable co-operative sports ===
- Wrestling (Boys Varsity with Westfield High School)
- Lacrosse (Boys/Girls Varsity with St. Mary's Parish School)
- Skiing (Boys/Girls Varsity with Gateway Regional High School)
- Swimming (Boys/Girls Varsity with Westfield High School)
- Ice Hockey (Boys Varsity with Westfield High School)

=== Former sports ===
- Football (Boys Varsity) (Late 1990s-2006)

== Gallery ==
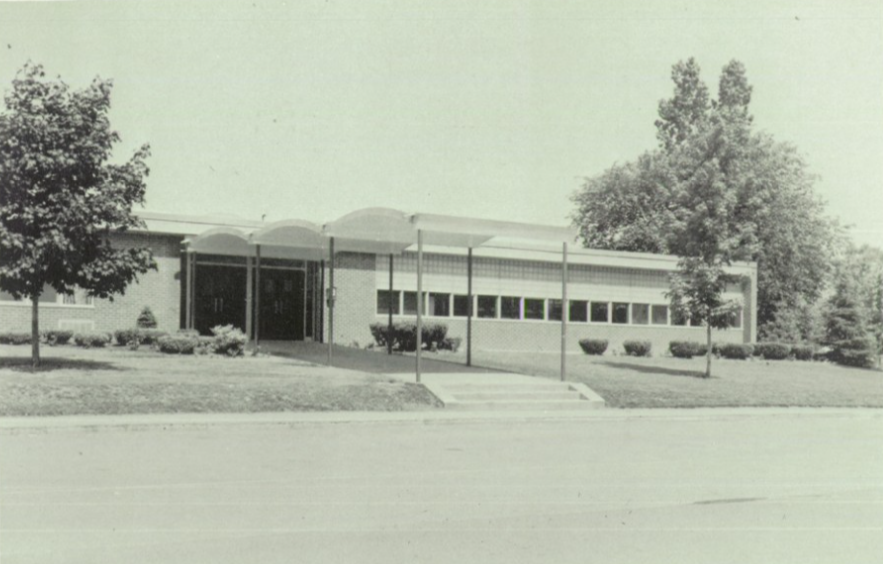
The school in 1973.

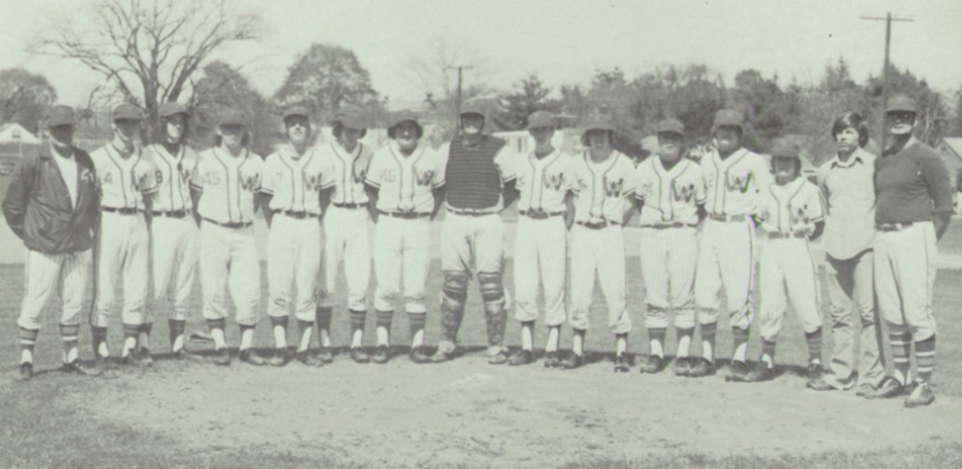
1972-1973 Baseball Team.
