= Richard P. Miller Jr. =

American politician

Dick Miller

Mayor of Oneonta
- In office January 1, 2010 – October 25, 2014
- Preceded by: John S. Nader
- Succeeded by: Russ Southard

9th President of Hartwick College
- In office July 1, 2003 – July 1, 2008
- Preceded by: Richard A. Detweiler
- Succeeded by: Margaret Drugovich

Personal details
- Born: Richard P. Miller Jr.
- Died: October 25, 2014 Oneonta, New York
- Party: Independent
- Other political affiliations: Democratic; Collaborate for Oneonta
- Education: Middlebury College

Richard P. Miller Jr., also known as Dick Miller, was an American business executive, academic administrator, and politician. He served as 9th president of Hartwick College from 2003 to 2008, and as mayor of Oneonta, New York from 2010 until his death in 2014.

== Early life and education ==
Miller grew up in Pittsford, New York, a suburb of Rochester. His father, Richard P. Miller Sr., was chief executive of the Rochester Community Chest, precursor of the United Way. His mother, Faith Moran Miller was from a large family in Seneca Falls, NY where her mother, Richard's maternal grandmother, was one of the original suffragettes. After high school, Miller attended Middlebury College, where he majored in sociology, joined the Army ROTC, played collegiate Golf, and was manager of the ski team.

== Military service ==
From 1965 to 1967, Miller served in the U.S. Army, First Cavalry Division (Airmobile), attaining the rank of first lieutenant. As a forward observer in the artillery, he participated in action in the Ia Drang Valley, near Pleiku, Republic of Vietnam. He was awarded The Army Commendation Medal with a "V" Device (valor) for heroism, The Bronze Star, and the Army Air Medal, for having flown more than 25 missions over hostile enemy territory.

== Professional and political career ==
After Vietnam, Miller ran ski shops in Portland, ME and was a sales representative and later national product Manager for the Head Ski Company(owned at the time by AMF). Miller re-joined Case-Hoyt, a commercial printing company, where he had started as a sales representative in 1967. By 1982, he was the president and CEO of the company. Miller held a variety of positions at the University of Rochester and eventually served as senior vice president and chief operating officer of the university from 1996 to 2000. He was a trustee of Hobart and William Smith Colleges, and served as the vice chancellor and chief operating officer of the State University of New York. On May 2, 2003, the Hartwick College Board of Trustees announced that they unanimously endorsed Miller to become the next president of Hartwick College.

During his time as president of Hartwick College, he presided over increases in both enrollment and the college endowment.

On May 10, 2009, Miller announced his intentions to run for mayor of Oneonta. A political Independent, he sought endorsements from all of the city's political parties to go along with his 'Collaborate for Oneonta' ballot line. Despite being a co-chairman for Republican state senator James Seward's reelection campaign in 2008, the city's Republican committee declined to endorse Miller and also declined him the chance to force a primary. The county Democratic committee allowed him to run in their primary, where he won with 77 percent of the vote. He raised over $11,000 for his campaign and won.

Miller ran for reelection unopposed in 2013.

== Personal life and death ==
Miller married his first wife, Barbara (Howd) Miller of Troy, NY upon graduating college in 1965. The couple had two children. The couple split after 35 years or marriage and Miller later remarried and lived in Oneonta until his death.

On October 25, 2014, Miller took his own life. The death was considered unexpected and shocking.
