= Brockton Rox (Frontier League) =

Frontier League baseball team in Brockton, Massachusetts

- Logo

Information
- League: National Association of Professional Baseball
- Location: Brockton, Massachusetts
- Ballpark: Campanelli Stadium
- Founded: 2024
- Former name: New England Chowdahheads (pre-debut); New England Knockouts (2024)
- Colors: Navy, red, gray, white
- Ownership: Bill Janetscheck
- General manager: Connor Carey
- Manager: Jerod Edmondson
- Media: HomeTeam Network
- Website: brocktonrox.com

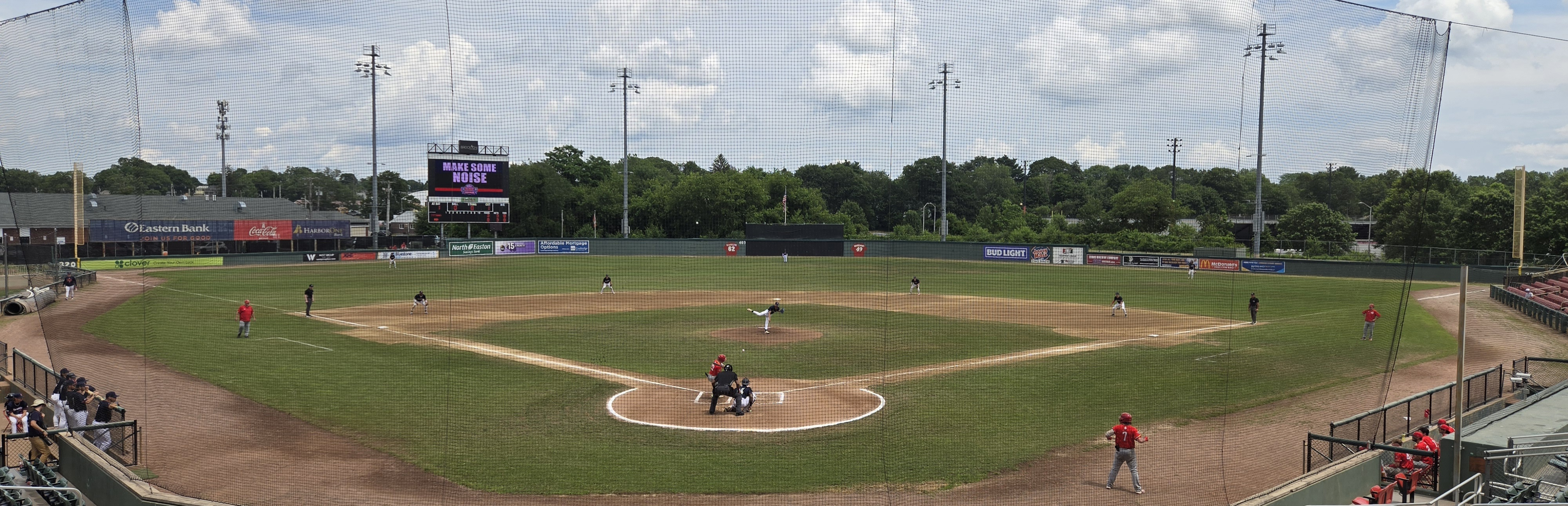
A Brockton Rox home game against the Ottawa Titans

The Brockton Rox are a professional baseball team based in Brockton, Massachusetts. The Rox compete in the National Association of Professional Baseball (NAPB) as a member of the North Division in the Atlantic Conference. The team has been in existence since 2024, making them the third-youngest team in the FL, prior to the 2024 Frontier League expansion.

The Rox are one of the newest FL teams, along with the Mississippi Mud Monsters and Down East Bird Dawgs. They joined the league as part of the 2024 Frontier League expansion as the New England Knockouts. Prior to the 2025 season, the team was renamed to the Brockton Rox, following the folding of the original Brockton Rox, a collegiate team that had the same name. The original Brockton Rox shared their home ballpark with the Knockouts during the 2024 season, until it was announced that the Knockouts had been acquired by the former Greenville Drive and Salem Red Sox owner, Bill Janetscheck. With the change in ownership, the team announced a rebrand to the Brockton Rox, marking the demise of the FCBL franchise. The Rox plays its home games at Campanelli Stadium.

== History ==
The Frontier League announced late in the 2023 season that it would be placing a team in Brockton for the 2024 Frontier League season to replace the Empire State Greys, a traveling team founded when the Southern Illinois Miners were disbanded after their owners retired. Brockton's most recent professional baseball team had been the former iteration of the Brockton Rox, who were founded as a member of the former Northern League in 2002, and left the Can-Am League following the 2011 season to become a collegiate league team.

A team naming contest was conducted following the 2023 season, with five names chosen as finalists. Of these, the most popular was New England Chowdahheads, and the team initially selected it as their new moniker, announcing it in November 2023. However, reactions from fans and local business leaders in the area were mediocre at best. As such, the owners of the team reconsidered. On December 15, they announced that they would be dropping the Chowdahheads name in favor of a name that was reflective of Brockton's history of producing championship caliber prizefighters such as Rocky Marciano and Marvelous Marvin Hagler—the New England Knockouts.

The team has seen four players find their way into affiliated ball with Catcher John Cristino (NYY) 2024, Catcher Hemmanuel Rosario (HOU) 2025, RHP Mike McKenna (MIN) 2024/2025, and RHP Sam Ryan (LAA) 2024, all having their contracts purchased. Sam Ryan would go on to be selected in the minor league phase of the 2026 Rule 5 draft by the Minnesota Twins, joining 2024 teammate Mike McKenna in the organization.

On January 29, 2025, it was announced that the Knockouts franchise had been acquired by former Greenville Drive and Salem Red Sox owner, Bill Janetscheck. With the change in ownership, the team announced a rebrand to the Brockton Rox. The previously noted Brockton Rox, that originated as a professional team, had competed in the Futures Collegiate Baseball League from 2012 through 2024, the final season of which they shared Campanelli Stadium with the Knockouts.

== Current Roster (Preseason 2026) ==
Brockton Rox roster
Active roster	Coaching staff
Pitchers: -- Trevor Anibal RP; 19 Heisell Baro RP; -- Richard Brito SP; 5 Jared Henry; -- Pierce Williams; -- Brendan O'Donnell RP; -- Thomas Nelson; -- Michael Quigley SP; -- Brendan Bell RP; -- Casey Bargo SP; -- Omar Melendez; -- Thomas Nelson; -- Michael Esposito; -- Carson McKenna; -- Richie Cimpric; -- Joey Kemlage SP; -- Matt Colucci; -- Eli Majick; -- Michael Satturia; -- Brock Riley; Utility players: -- Evan Sleight INF/OF/C; 3 Keagan Calero INF/OF; -- Zach Eldred RHP/1B; -- Kyle Carlson; -- Taylor Freeman; Catchers: 17 Derek Bender; -- Ricardo Hernandez; Infielders: 16 Trey Ciulla-Hall; 9 JR DiSarcina; 12 Evan Giordano; 24 Jack-Thomas Wold; -- Scott Seeker; -- Eddie Javier; Outfielders: 14 Tommy Kretzler; 15 Austin White	Manager: -- Jerod Edmondson; Coaches: -- Dan Sausville Pitching Coach; -- Andrew Caulfield Hitting Coach/Bullpen Catcher; Disabled list; ‡ Inactive list; § Suspended list; updated May 4, 2025 Transactions

== Season-by-season records ==
Season	W-L record	Win %	Finish	Playoffs
2024	38–56	.404	6th in FL East	Did not qualify
2025	38–54	.413	4th in FL North	Did not qualify
2026	40–61	.396	3rd in FL North	Did not qualify
Totals	116–171	.404	—N/a	—N/a

== Mascots ==
The team utilizes two boxing kangaroo mascots, due to Brockton's heritage of boxing: K-O (carried over from the original Brockton Rox), and Champ.

The Knockouts bulldog mascot never made a physical appearance.
