= Futures Collegiate Baseball League =

American sports league

- Current season, competition or edition: 2026 FCBL season
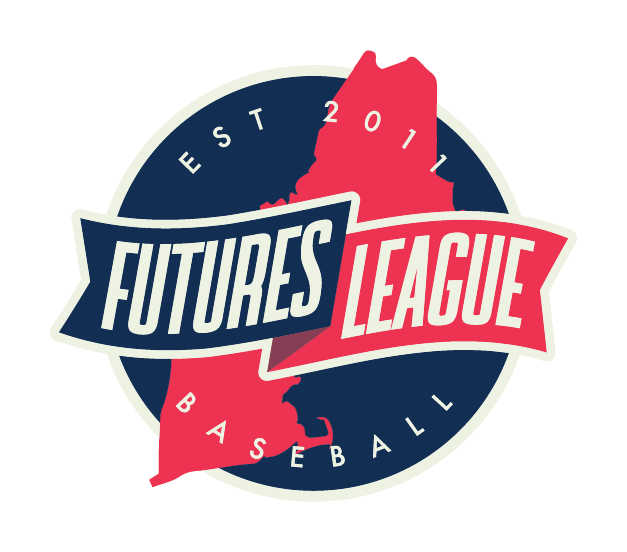
- Sport: Baseball
- Founded: 2010
- Commissioner: Joe Paolucci
- Motto: Who will be the first?
- No. of teams: 7 (2026 season)
- Country: United States
- Most recent champion: New Britain Bees (2026) (1)
- Most titles: 6, Nashua Silver Knights
- Website: thefuturesleague.com

The Futures Collegiate Baseball League (FCBL) is a collegiate summer baseball league that began play in 2011. It contains seven teams as of the 2026 season, with three active franchises in Massachusetts, two in Connecticut, and one each in New Hampshire and Vermont.

== Format ==
The Futures League is a wood-bat league. Its regular season schedule calls for 64 games per team as of 2023 (32 home and 32 away games).

FCBL ballplayers are unpaid collegiate athletes who join the league to gain experience and exposure to Major League Baseball scouts. The FCBL mission is to prepare young men for the rigors of playing professional baseball.

=== Unique rules ===
The league accepts players who were on college baseball rosters during the preceding spring season, as well as players who have signed a commitment to play college baseball in the upcoming school year. In 2018, teams were allowed to carry up to five "commits". At least 15 of the 30 players on a roster must have a local connection, either residing in New England or affiliated with a college in New England.

Since 2017, regular-season games that are tied after regulation and remain tied after one extra inning are decided by a "Home Run Derby", a coach-pitched home-run hitting contest. In each round, the visitors compete, followed by the home team. A team's score in a round is the number of home runs it hits before making a certain number of "outs" (defined as any ball hit in fair territory that is not a home run). In the first round, teams can use up to three hitters and are allowed 10 outs. If the teams hit the same number of home runs, a second round is played that allows five outs. If still tied, a third round gives the batters three outs. The original FCBL Home Run Derby was a race against the clock, in which the three rounds comprised three, two, and then one minute.

Since 2023, the top four teams in "points percentage" make the playoffs. Points (the numerator) are two points for each game won plus one point for each loss by Home Run Derby—similar to how points are awarded for overtime losses in the National Hockey League points system. The denominator is the number of games played.

== History ==
The Futures League was co-developed by:

- Drew Weber, who owned the Class A Short Season Lowell Spinners and developed and owned the Double-A New Hampshire Fisher Cats, and
- Chris Carminucci, whose Carminucci Sports Group operated the Brockton Rox of the independent Can-Am League.

The Carminucci Sports Group sought to place an NECBL franchise on the island of Martha's Vineyard, and the Spinners hoped to do the same in Nashua, New Hampshire. The NECBL declined to expand, so the organizations formed a separate league. The FCBL aimed to use professional baseball operators with proven histories. Most FCBL venues are former professional ballparks (marked with an asterisk in the table below).

=== 2011 season ===
The league started play in the 2011 season. Martha's Vineyard, Nashua, Seacoast, and Torrington were the charter franchises. The championship paired the top two franchises in a best-of-three series. Nashua (27–16) won the regular season and defeated Torrington (25–17) for the championship.

=== 2012 season ===
For the 2012 season, the FCBL expanded from four to nine teams. The league expanded into the Leominster/Fitchburg, Massachusetts area with the addition of the Wachusett Dirt Dawgs. In addition, the FCBL induced the North Shore and Old Orchard Beach franchises to jump from the NECBL, as well as the Pittsfield and Brockton franchises of the professional, independent Can-Am League to convert to the collegiate format. The Pittsfield franchise was acquired by majority owner Marvin Goldklang and the Goldklang Group, which owns and operates four other minor-league baseball teams.

An all-star game was played, pitting selected players from the four charter teams against the five new teams.

The post-season was also revamped to involve four of the nine teams. The winners of two best-of-three division series (#4 plays #1, #3 plays #2) competed in a best-of-three championship series. Nashua repeated as FCBL Champion.

=== 2013 season ===
The 2013 season was played with the same nine franchises as in 2012. The playoffs were expanded to include the top six teams of the nine. The teams finishing first and second got a first-round bye, with the remaining playoff teams to play a new initial round consisting of a single game.

Earlier, a league press release had mentioned that "The FCBL is planning and negotiating with other locations for further expansion in the 2013 season." Speculation had centered on Worcester, Massachusetts, where the Worcester Tornadoes had lost its affiliation with the Can-Am League. A Tornadoes creditor, John Creedon Jr., was in discussions with the College of the Holy Cross to secure a lease for Hanover Insurance Park at Fitton Field.

The all-star game was structured as Massachusetts versus "New England" (the four non-Massachusetts teams).

The regular season was extended by two days (to August 9 and 10) in view of the season's many rain-outs. The games scheduled for these days sometimes were not against opponents that were due to complete a rained-out game. The one-game play-in games occurred on the afternoon of August 11—not at the site of the higher-seeded team, but at the site of the winner's opponent in the next round, which began the same evening. This next round, a best-of-three series, was slated for alternating sites, though in neither case was the third game necessary. The final round reverted to the prior year's rule, in which the higher-seeded team (in this case, Martha's Vineyard) had the option of hosting the first game or any remaining games. Martha's Vineyard elected to open the series in Nashua, on August 14, and won the series at home the next day.

=== 2014 season ===
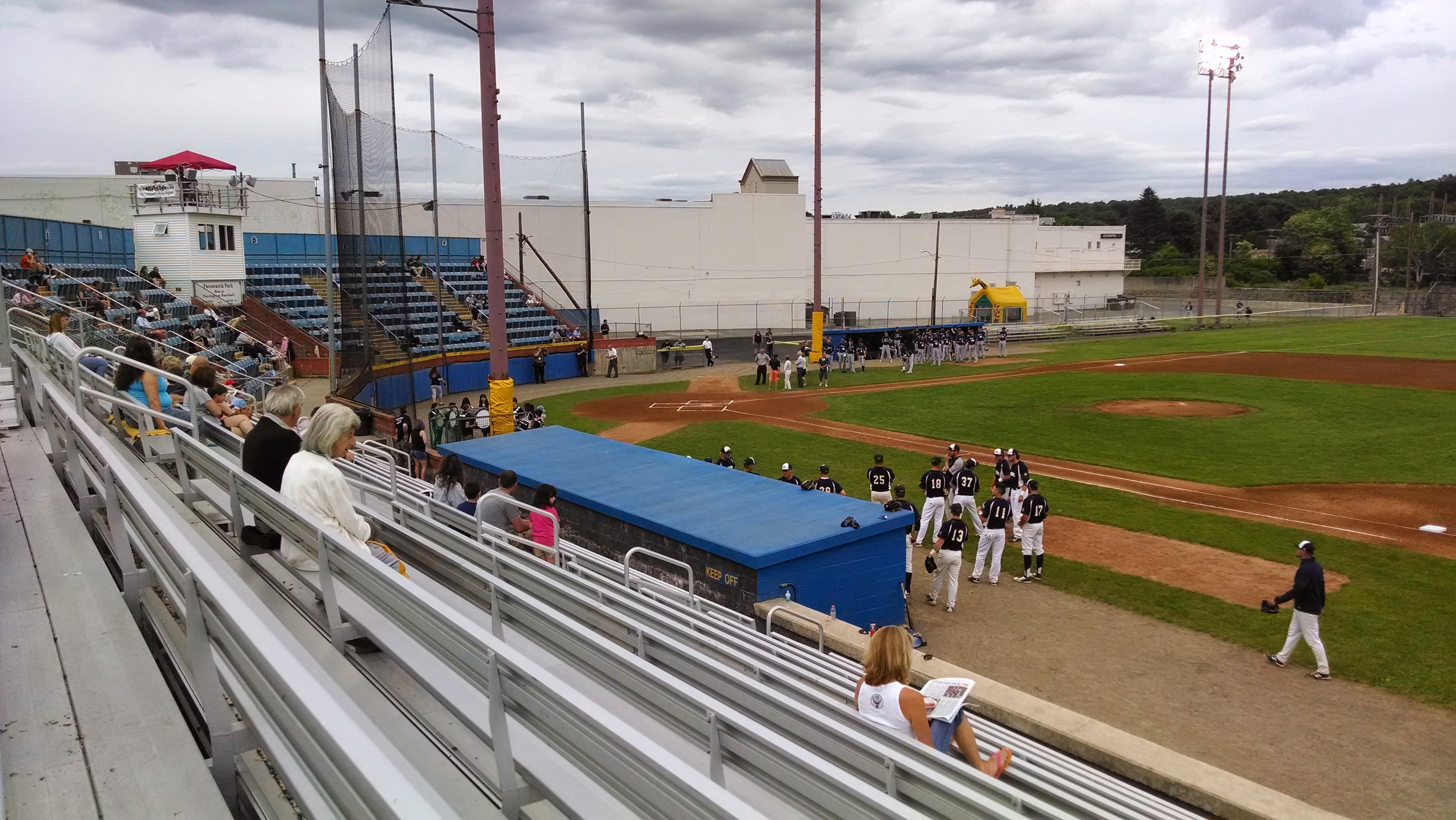
Pregame of the Worcester Bravehearts' inaugural game in 2014. Worcester went on to win that season's league championship.

For the 2014 season the league split into an East and West division of five teams each. The All-Star Game assembled teams comprising the best players of each division; on July 24, the West beat the East, 4–1. The regular season expanded to 56 games, with each team playing 28 home games and 28 road games. No team actually played 56 games, as rain-outs occurring late in the season were not made up. The 2014 FCBL playoffs were conducted as in 2013, except that the rules gave the winner of each division the bye in round one, and guaranteed that, of the next four teams with the best overall records, the higher-seeded team would host the one-game play-in.

On September 20, 2013, John Creedon Jr., who prior to the 2013 season had discussed bringing baseball back to the city of Worcester, announced that he would indeed operate the league's tenth franchise at Hanover Insurance Park at Fitton Field starting in 2014, and unveiled the Bravehearts on December 2, 2013.

The two division winners, Worcester (West) and Martha's Vineyard (East), won their semifinal series and met in the best-of-three final series. Worcester swept the series to become the 2014 champions.

=== 2015 season ===
For 2015, the Old Orchard Beach franchise was replaced by the Bristol Blues. The Nashua franchise was moved from the West Division to the East Division to maintain both divisions at five teams. The playoffs were further expanded to include eight of the ten teams in post-season play. The first two playoff rounds consisted of a single elimination game, in two days reducing the playoff field from eight teams to two. The East was the stronger division; the new Bristol team (33–23), which won the West Division, had a worse record than three of the teams in the East. Bristol faced the Worcester Bravehearts (26–30) in the final series; last year's champion had flirted with elimination for much of the season, but came on strong in the final weeks of the regular season to finish second in the West. The higher-seeded Bristol elected that the series begin in Worcester, where Worcester won. In the games played at Bristol, Bristol won Game 2, but Worcester won the deciding game, on August 16, to repeat as FCBL champions.

=== 2016 season ===
In November 2015, the league announced that the playoff format would revert to that of 2014, with six of ten teams making the post-season. The Seacoast Mavericks had the first winning season in its six-year history, but lost the semifinal series to Nashua in three games. Worcester returned to the finals, but Nashua won that series, defeating Worcester first at home and then in Worcester.

A visit by Bristol to North Shore on July 27 was suspended at 7 minutes after midnight, tied 4–4 after 17 innings. It was completed on August 4, North Shore scoring the winning run on a sacrifice fly in the 21st inning. The game was the longest FCBL game ever, taking a total of 6:04 to play. It disrupted the scheduling of both pitching staffs and led the league to announce a rules change the next year.

=== 2017 season ===
On December 20, 2016, the Futures League published a 2017 schedule for a nine-team league not including the Titans. The following month, the league announced a point system, similar to that used by the National Hockey League (NHL), to decide playoff seedings. For games decided without the need for a Home Run Derby (see below), the winning team would receive two points. For games requiring a Home Run Derby, both teams would receive one point, with a team winning a derby receiving an additional point. Near the end of the regular season, the league clarified that the basis for seeding teams in the playoffs would actually be "point percentage": the ratio of actual points to potential points (total potential points being twice the number of games played). The clarification was necessary because the clubs had had different numbers of games cancelled by bad weather. The interpretation eventually helped Worcester qualify for the post-season at the expense of Martha's Vineyard.

All six games of the play-in and semifinal rounds were won by the lower-seeded team. This set up a final series between fifth-seeded Nashua and sixth-seeded Worcester, a repeat of the 2016 finals. Defending champion Nashua Silver Knights won one game away and at home against the Worcester Bravehearts to repeat as champions.

==== Introduction of the Home Run Derby ====
On January 27, 2017, the league announced that regular-season games tied after 10 innings would be decided by a home-run hitting contest. The league stated that the purpose of this rule was to protect pitchers' arms and encourage college coaches to recommend the league to their pitchers.

The first use of the Home Run Derby was June 7, when the visiting Martha's Vineyard Sharks tied the Wachusett Dirt Dawgs, 13–13, after 10 innings. In the first (three-minute) round of the Home Run Derby, the Sharks hit a total of 5 home runs out of Doyle Field, using both their time-outs to substitute batters at each one-minute interval. The Dirt Dawgs used Zack Tower, who had not played in the regulation game. He hit 5 home runs in 70 seconds, at which point the Dirt Dawgs used their first time-out. Tower remained at bat and hit the deciding home run shortly after.

In the 238 games played in the 2017 regular season, a total of 10 used the Home Run Derby. There were no tie games. In 7-inning games of doubleheaders, the Home Run Derby was used if the teams were tied after 8 innings.

=== 2018 season ===
After the 2017 season, the Seacoast Mavericks declined to remain at Leary Field in Portsmouth, New Hampshire, in 2018 as it envisioned a sports complex in Dover, New Hampshire. The Wachusett Dirt Dawgs said that the city commission controlling the grounds declined to renew the operating agreement as "(The DPW) felt we weren't cleaning up after ourselves as well as we should". Both clubs paid their 2018 dues, anticipating a return to the league in 2019.

The league allowed teams to carry up to 5 "commits" (high-school graduates intending to play college baseball in the coming year). The league retained the Home Run Derby, but dropped the provision for tie games and standings based on a point system. The league also kept the 2017 format in which the top 6 teams made the playoffs (the lower-seeded four entering a one-game play-in), though this was now 6-of-7 rather than 6-of-9. In each three-game playoff series, the higher-seeded team was no longer given an option but was scheduled to host Game 1, and Game 3 if necessary.

A scoreless tie between Bristol and Nashua on June 7 was settled with the first Home Run Derby that had ever gone past the first (three-minute) round into the second (two-minute) round. Bristol's Connor Nolan hit three home runs in each round to out-hit Nashua, 6–5, and to give Bristol the victory by an official score of 1–0. Two other Derbies were tied after one round and went to the second round.

In the playoffs, top-seeded Martha's Vineyard and Worcester eventually became the finalists. When a weather-delayed final series resulted in a deciding Game 3 on Martha's Vineyard on August 13, which was called after being tied 1–1 in the first inning, Martha's Vineyard and Worcester were declared co-champions.

=== 2019 season ===
In the 2018 off-season, Commissioner Chris Hall announced his resignation. The league selected Joe Paolucci to replace him. The FCBL announced a new ownership group in Westfield, Massachusetts, but the move was countered as the Martha's Vineyard Sharks switched to the NECBL. The Futures League claimed this move would require either a two-thirds "hardship" vote of other franchises or payment of an exit fee, and sued to block the switch. The Sharks countersued, saying the league bylaws were never signed. The conflict delayed into 2019 the release of schedules by both leagues. On January 19, the NECBL announced the Sharks' entry into that league (replacing a team that folded and maintaining the NECBL at 13 teams). The FCBL announced its schedule on January 24, again with 7 franchises, 6 of them qualifying for the playoffs. On February 20, the league announced that the new seventh team would be called the Westfield Starfires.

John Creedon Jr., the owner of the Worcester Bravehearts, bought the Nashua Silver Knights from Drew Weber and from the others to which Weber had sold a minority interest.

The Westfield franchise trailed the other six during the regular season, suggesting its elimination from the playoffs—sometimes losing so many games as to give all six other franchises a .500 winning average or better. This was the case at the end of the regular season, Westfield finishing at 15–41. The other teams had relative parity, and first place changed hands frequently. Brockton and Bristol avoided the play-in round, but Worcester survived that round, won the semifinal series against Brockton, and swept the final series against Bristol to win the title.

The rules for locating the semifinal series apparently were changed via conference call to give the lower-seeded club the right to host the second game, but were changed back for the finals to give the higher-seeded club the choice of hosting the first game or all remaining games. In addition, Worcester's semifinal series was delayed for one day based on its lack of access to Fitton Field on August 7.

=== 2020 season ===
Changes for 2020 were announced on October 28, 2019. The Bristol Blues left the FCBL and joined the NECBL. The New Britain Bees, which formerly played in the Atlantic League, took the Blues' place as the seventh team. The 2020 season was to be played in two halves, with the first-half champion, second-half champion, and the two teams with next best won-lost records overall, advancing to the playoffs. The Home Run Derby to break ties continued for a fourth year, but lasting only a single, three-minute round.

Additional changes were forced by the COVID-19 pandemic. The NECBL and the Cape Cod League did not play at all, and the start of the FCBL's 2020 season was delayed. On June 22, the league announced a 39-game schedule to be played by six teams, without the Pittsfield Suns. Teams would play as a single division with a single, best-of-3 playoff series between the top two teams.

Based on "reopening guidelines" of the governors of Connecticut, Massachusetts, and New Hampshire, the league played an unbalanced schedule continuing further into August than ever before. Opening Day was July 2 in Connecticut and New Hampshire and July 7 for the four Massachusetts clubs. Mondays were league-wide off days but were available to make up games that had been rained out.

The playoffs were August 20 through 22, between the Worcester Bravehearts (23–15) and the Nashua Silver Knights (23–16). Worcester had played its home games at Doyle Field in Leominster, but the entire final series was played at Nashua, Worcester playing as the home team in games 1 and 3 due to its higher seed. Worcester won the first game but lost the second and third games, giving Nashua its fifth championship.

=== 2021 season ===
For 2021, the Futures League added the Vermont Lake Monsters in Burlington, Vermont, formerly of the Class A Short Season New York-Penn League. Chris English, the owner of the Brockton Rox, is the leader of the Lake Monsters' ownership group. The North Shore Navigators returned to the New England Collegiate Baseball League for 2021. The Norwich Sea Unicorns, also from the defunct New York-Penn League, joined the Futures League in 2021, bringing the league back up to eight teams. Vermont would go on to win the 2021 Futures League Championship Series.

=== 2022 season ===
In 2022, the Futures League remained at eight teams. For the third consecutive year, select Futures League games were broadcast on regional cable sports channel NESN. The Brockton Rox hosted five sons of former Major League players, including the sons of Boston Red Sox legends David Ortiz, Pedro Martinez, Keith Foulke, and Manny Ramirez.

The 2022 season saw the Vermont Lake Monsters win the regular season title for the second year in a row. New Britain, Nashua, and Westfield rounded out the four-team playoff field. The Nashua Silver Knights defeated the Vermont Lake Monsters in three games to win their sixth Futures League championship. Nashua would lose the first game at Centennial Field by a score of 12–0, but rebounded to win Game 2 at Holman Stadium, 6–5 on a walk-off, and the deciding Game 3 in Burlington, 6–5.

=== 2024 season ===
The league announced that Pittsfield would not play the 2024 season because of safety issues at Wahconah Park. A league-operated team known as the Road Warriors was formed to play the Pittsfield schedule (road games only). This decision reduced the regular season from 64 to about 56 games.

=== 2025 season ===
The league comprised six teams during the 2025 season. The Brockton Rox ceased operation, with its name taken on by a professional team previously known as the New England Knockouts in the Frontier League. Pittsfield again sat out the season, as Wahconah Park was not ready. With an even number of teams in the league, the Road Warriors were dropped from the schedule.

=== 2026 season ===
In July 2025, the league announced plans to add a new team based at Edward A. LeLacheur Park in Lowell, Massachusetts, former home of the minor-league Lowell Spinners. In November 2025, it was announced that the new team would also be known as the Spinners, and would begin play in the 2026 season.

== League officers ==
Joe Paolucci is the commissioner of the FCBL, succeeding Chris Hall, who served from 2011 through 2018. John Creedon Jr., the owner of the Worcester Bravehearts and Nashua Silver Knights, is chairman of the league's board of directors.

== Teams ==
Current teams
Team	Founded	Joined	City	Stadium	Capacity
Lowell Spinners*	1996 (pro); 2025 (FCBL)	2026	Lowell, Massachusetts	Edward A. LeLacheur Park^	4,767
Nashua Silver Knights	2011		Nashua, New Hampshire	Holman Stadium^	2,800
New Britain Bees*	2015	2020	New Britain, Connecticut	New Britain Stadium^	6,146
Norwich Sea Unicorns*	2019	2021	Norwich, Connecticut	Dodd Stadium^	6,270
Vermont Lake Monsters*	1994	2021	Burlington, Vermont	Centennial Field^	4,415
Westfield Starfires	2019		Westfield, Massachusetts	Bullens Field	1,000
Worcester Bravehearts	2014		Worcester, Massachusetts	Fitton Field^	3,000

Former teams
Team	Years	City	Stadium	Disposition
Bristol Blues	2015–2019	Bristol, Connecticut	Muzzy Field^	Moved to NECBL
Brockton Rox*	2012–2024	Brockton, Massachusetts	Campanelli Stadium^	Discontinued
Futures League Road Warriors	2024	—N/a	—N/a	Dormant
Martha's Vineyard Sharks	2011–2018	Oak Bluffs, Massachusetts	The Shark Tank	Moved to NECBL
North Shore Navigators	2012–2020	Lynn, Massachusetts	Fraser Field^	Moved to NECBL
Old Orchard Beach Raging Tide	2012–2014	Old Orchard Beach, Maine	The Ballpark^	Discontinued
Pittsfield Suns	2012-2023	Pittsfield, Massachusetts	Wahconah Park^	Inactive, awaiting reconstruction of stadium.
Seacoast Mavericks	2011–2017	Portsmouth, New Hampshire	Leary Field	Discontinued
Torrington Titans	2011–2016	Torrington, Connecticut	Fuessenich Park^	Discontinued
Wachusett Dirt Dawgs	2012–2017	Leominster, Massachusetts	Doyle Field	Discontinued

* Former professional baseball team
^ Former professional baseball venue

== League champions ==
- 2011: Nashua Silver Knights
- 2012: Nashua Silver Knights
- 2013: Martha's Vineyard Sharks
- 2014: Worcester Bravehearts
- 2015: Worcester Bravehearts
- 2016: Nashua Silver Knights
- 2017: Nashua Silver Knights
- 2018: Worcester Bravehearts and Martha's Vineyard Sharks declared co-champions
- 2019: Worcester Bravehearts
- 2020: Nashua Silver Knights
- 2021: Vermont Lake Monsters
- 2022: Nashua Silver Knights
- 2023: Norwich Sea Unicorns
- 2024: Norwich Sea Unicorns
- 2025: Norwich Sea Unicorns
- 2026: New Britain Bees

== Single season records ==
Individual	Name	Team	School	Record	Year
Individual Hitting
Batting Average	Dean Ferrara	Norwich Sea Unicorns	Fairfield University	.422	2023
Hits	Cam Cook	Nashua Silver Knights	Nichols College	81	2017
Runs	Austin White	Bristol Blues	University of Rhode Island	56	2019
Doubles	Mickey Gasper; Gavin Noriega	Nashua Silver Knights; Worcester Bravehearts	Bryant University; Marist College	21	2016; 2022
Triples	AJ Soldra; Lorenzo Arcuri	Norwich Sea Unicorns; Bristol Blues	Seton Hall; Youngstown State	8	2024; 2016
Home Runs	Ryan Gendron	Seacoast Mavericks	Southern New Hampshire University	22	2015
Extra Base Hits	Ryan Gendron	Seacoast Mavericks	Southern New Hampshire University	33	2015
Runs Batted In	Eric Hamilton	Pittsfield Suns	SUNY Oswego State	63	2016
Walks	Austin White	Bristol Blues	University of Rhode Island	59	2015
Stolen Bases	Joel Lara	New Britain Bees	Franklin Pierce University	54	2022
On Base Percentage	Mickey Gasper	Nashua Silver Knights	Bryant University	.532	2016
Slugging Percentage	Ryan Gendron	Seacoast Mavericks	Southern New Hampshire University	.758	2015
On Base Plus Slugging Percentage	Mickey Gasper	Nashua Silver Knights	Bryant University	1.257	2016
Individual Pitching
Appearances	George Goldstein	Vermont Lake Monsters	Middlebury College	27	2022
Starts	Jon Pusateri	Brockton Rox	University of Akron	12	2014
Complete Games	Mike Gibbons	Torrington Titans	Wheaton College	3	2013
Shutouts	Mike Gibbons	Torrington Titans	Wheaton College	2	2013
Innings	Mike Bradstreet	Martha's Vineyard Sharks	University of Rhode Island	75.2	2012
Wins	Bob Carbaugh	Martha's Vineyard Sharks	Seton Hill University	8	2013
ERA	Tyler Dierke	Torrington Titans	Kenyon College	0.61	2012
Strikeouts	Jack Choate	Worcester Bravehearts	Assumption University	82	2021
Saves	Cody Rocha	Nashua Silver Knights	Assumption University	17	2013
Opponent Batting Average	Nick Fuller	Torrington Titans	UMass Dartmouth	.168	2013
WHIP	Matt Quintana	Martha's Vineyard Sharks	Siena College	0.768	2014
Strikeouts per 9 Innings	Nick Sinacola	Brockton Rox	University of Maine	14.52	2019

== Career records ==
Stat	Name	Team	School	Record	Years
Individual Hitting
Games	Ryan Sullivan	Nashua Silver Knights	Southern New Hampshire University	185	2013-17
At Bats	Ryan Sullivan	Nashua Silver Knights	Southern New Hampshire University	682	2013-17
Batting Average	Dean Ferrara	Norwich Sea Unicorns	Fairfield University	.422	2023
Hits	Ryan Sullivan	Nashua Silver Knights	Southern New Hampshire University	199	2013-17
Doubles	Ryan Sullivan	Nashua Silver Knights	Southern New Hampshire University	41	2013-17
Triples	JP Knight	North Shore/Brockton	Bryant University	10	2018-20
Home Runs	Zack Tower	Pittsfield/Worcester/Wachusett	UMass Lowell	44	2014-17
Extra Base Hits	Zack Tower	Pittsfield/Worcester/Wachusett	UMass Lowell	86	2014-17
Runs Batted In	Ryan Sullivan	Nashua Silver Knights	Southern New Hampshire University	145	2013-17
Runs	Zack Tower	Pittsfield/Worcester/Wachusett	UMass Lowell	113	2014-17
Walks	Mariano Ricciardi	Worcester Bravehearts	Cyprus College	99	2017-20
Stolen Bases	Joel Lara	Brockton/Pittsfield/New Britain	Franklin Pierce University	91	2020-22
Total Bases	Ryan Sullivan	Nashua Silver Knights	Southern New Hampshire University	351	2013-17
On Base Percentage	Mickey Gasper	Nashua Silver Knights	Bryant University	.532	2016
Slugging Percentage	Mickey Gasper	Nashua Silver Knights	Bryant University	.726	2016
On Base Plus Slugging Percentage	Mickey Gasper	Nashua Silver Knights	Bryant University	1.257	2016
Sac Flys	Ryan Sullivan	Nashua Silver Knights	Southern New Hampshire University	9	2013-17
Individual Pitching
Appearances	Wyatt Cameron	Vermont Lake Monsters	Central Connecticut State University	78	2021–24
Innings	Jamin McCann	Pittsfield Suns	East Tennessee State	166.2	2014-16
Wins	Francis Ferguson	Vermont Lake Monsters	Eastern Nazarene College	14	2021–23
ERA	Alek Morency	Nashua Silver Knights	Merrimack College	2.58	2011-13
Strikeouts	Shayne Audet	North Shore/Westfield	New England College	179	2018–19, 2021–23
Saves	Cody Rocha	Nashua Silver Knights	Assumption College	26	2011-13
