= Brockton Rox (2002–2024) =

Massachusetts, USA collegiate baseball team

Information
- Location: Brockton, Massachusetts
- Ballpark: Campanelli Stadium
- Founded: 2002
- League championships: 1 Northeast League (2003)
- Division championships: 1 Northeast League (2003)
- Former leagues: Futures Collegiate Baseball League (2012–2024); Can-Am League (2005–2011); Northeast League (2003–2004); Northern League (2002)
- Colors: Navy blue, red, silver, white
- Mascot: K-O the Kangaroo
- Ownership: Summerball LLC

The Brockton Rox were a baseball team based in Brockton, Massachusetts, United States. Initially a professional baseball franchise, the Rox were a member of the independent Canadian-American Association of Professional Baseball, from the 2005 through 2011 seasons. They were a part of collegiate summer baseball from the 2012 through 2024 seasons as part of the Futures Collegiate Baseball League until the team folded. In 2024, the New England Knockouts were formed and one season later, they rebranded into the new Brockton Rox. The Rox play their home games at Campanelli Stadium. The team's name was a derivative of the nearby Boston Red Sox of the American League and a tribute to the boxers Rocky Marciano and Marvelous Marvin Hagler, both from Brockton.

In 2012, the Rox announced that they were going to join the Futures Collegiate Baseball League and leave the Can-Am League but would retain its rights to rejoin the league for 2013. They remained in the FCBL, while the Can-Am League later merged with the Frontier League. In January 2025, it was announced that the collegiate team was folding while the professional New England Knockouts would be renamed as the Brockton Rox.

== History ==
=== Professional baseball ===
The Brockton Rox began play in the 2002 season as members of the East Division of the Northern League. In 2003, the Eastern ball clubs split off from the rest of the Northern League and became the Northeast League, where the Rox played in 2003 and 2004. In 2005, the Northeast League was re-branded as the Canadian American Association of Professional Baseball, commonly known as the Can-Am League.

On May 23, 2005, the club gave a roster spot to former Boston Red Sox pitcher and colorful personality Oil Can Boyd. Also in 2005, the team made headlines by offering Theo Epstein a position with the team.

In 2006, the Rox celebrated the team's fifth anniversary season by finishing the season 49–43 and qualifying as the third seed in the Can-Am League playoffs. The Rox defeated the New Haven County Cutters, 3–1, in the opening round best-of-five series. In the Championship Series, the Rox fell behind 2 games to 0 against the Quebec Capitales before rallying to tie the series at 2–2. In the deciding fifth game, the Rox took a 3–2 lead into the 8th inning, but a late rally by Quebec left Brockton on the losing end, 5–4, giving Quebec its first ever Can-Am League Championship.

Rox designated hitter Guye Senjem was named the Rox Most Valuable Player for 2006, and RHP John Kelly was named the team's Most Valuable Pitcher. Senjem, a Minnesota native, began his professional career with the St. Paul Saints in 1997. Before arriving in Brockton in 2005, he spent time in the Cincinnati Reds and Colorado Rockies organizations. He set an early tone for a successful 2006 campaign with a game-winning solo home run in the 10th inning on Opening Night at Campanelli Stadium. He went on to tie the franchise mark for home runs in a single season with 14, and led the team in home runs, and runs batted in. Twice, the left-handed hitter was named the Can-Am League’s Batter of the Week. In addition, he was named to the League's post-season All-Star team. Kelly was acquired by the Rox in a trade with the New Jersey Jackals in the month of June. The right-handed veteran made an immediate impact, and was nearly perfect after joining the team. He recorded a save in his first appearance, and proceeded to win his first five starts with the Rox. In 15 appearances with Brockton, he was 8–1 with a 1.92 earned run average (ERA).

Before the 2009 season, the Rox hired Chris Carminucci, former Atlantic City Surf President and Director of Baseball Operations, as field manager. In 2009, the team won 56 games, a franchise record which was also best in the league. They lost in the first round of the playoffs, 3–1, to the eventual champion, the Quebec Capitales.

Towards the end of the 2009 season, it became known that owners and management were $300,000 in debt, and they were looking to the city to restructure their lease commitments. However, with Carminucci Sports Group (CSG) taking control as the club's new managing partner, the Rox were stabilized and had a successful 2010 season, competing for a spot in the playoffs. CSG also held stock in several other minor-league teams in the American Association.

On January 4, 2011, the Rox announced the signing of Bill Buckner as their new manager.

=== Collegiate baseball ===
In December 2011, it was announced that the Rox would become an amateur collegiate summer baseball team and play in the Futures Collegiate Baseball League (FCBL) in 2012. Rhett Wiseman, while playing for the Rox, was named the top prospect in the FCBL in 2012, even though he was the only high school player on a roster of college-age players. In 2014, Zack Short was awarded the Adam Keenan Sportsmanship and Scholarship Award and manager Bryan Stark was named the Manager of the Year. In 2023, Marika Lyszczyk, a player from Canada, became the first woman to play in the FCBL, by pitching for the Rox.

During the 2024 season, the Rox shared their home ballpark with the New England Knockouts, a professional team competing in the Frontier League (FL).

On January 29, 2025, it was announced that the Knockouts franchise had been acquired by the former Greenville Drive and Salem Red Sox owner, Bill Janetscheck. With the change in ownership, the team announced a re-brand to the Brockton Rox, marking the demise of the FCBL franchise.

== Postseason appearances ==
=== Northeast League ===
Year	Divisional Series		NEL Championship Series	
2003	New Jersey Jackals	W (3–1)	North Shore Spirit	W (3–0)

=== Can-Am League ===
Year	Semifinals		Can-Am League Finals	
2005	Québec Capitales	L (0–3)		
2006	New Haven County Cutters	W (3–1)	Québec Capitales	L (2–3)
2009	Québec Capitales	L (1–3)		
2010	Pittsfield Colonials	L (1–3)		
2011	Québec Capitales	L (0–3)		

=== FCBL ===
Year	Play-In Round**		Semi-Final Round*		FCBL Championship
2012			Nashua Silver Knights	L (0–2)	
2013	North Shore Navigators	W (1–0)	Nashua Silver Knights	L (0–2)	
2014	Pittsfield Suns	L (0–1)			
2015	Worcester Bravehearts	L (0–1)			
2016	North Shore Navigators	L (0–1)			
2017	Bye		Worcester Bravehearts	L (0–2)	
2018	Nashua Silver Knights	W (1–0)	Martha's Vineyard Sharks	L (1–2)	
2019	Bye		Worcester Bravehearts	L (1–2)	

- *The FCBL changed its postseason to a two-round format starting in the 2012 season
- ** A one-game Play-In round was added in the 2013 season

== Logos and uniforms ==
The official colors of the Brockton Rox are navy blue, red, and silver. The primary logo formerly consisted of the "Rox" wordmark in red with navy blue outline, with a pair of boxing gloves (an allusion to two boxers from Brockton: Rocky Marciano and Marvelous Marvin Hagler). In 2024, the Rox began using a modified version of the Chicago White Sox' logo used from 1976 until 1990; the only difference being the "SOX" wordmark replaced with "ROX".

The Brockton Rox game cap is navy blue with the "B" cap logo centered on the front in red with white outline.

The Rox adopted new colors following the 2010 season; the team previously wore teal, cream, brown, and black. Some of the inaugural season uniforms used the “ROX” lettering across the chest with “ROCKS” as the inverse shadow below. The remaining uniforms reversed that with “ROCKS” as the main lettering across the chest with “ROX” as the inverse shadow below.

== Mascot ==
K-O the Boxing Kangaroo is the team's mascot, due to Brockton's heritage of boxing. He debuted in 2003, and the original performer from that season was hired by the then-Tampa Bay Devil Rays to serve as their mascot. She also went on to mascot for the NHL's Tampa Bay Lightning, and currently also runs her own mascot costume company, Amazing! Mascots Inc., which is where K-O's current costume was made.

== Retired numbers ==
The team's retired numbers for men who did not play baseball professionally. The retired numbers include the numbers of fights won by two famous boxers from the area: undefeated heavyweight champion Rocky Marciano and middleweight champion "Marvelous" Marvin Hagler:

- 42, Jackie Robinson, retired throughout baseball
- 49, Rocky Marciano (boxer, 49 career wins)
- 62, Marvin Hagler (boxer, 62 career wins)

Preceded by New Jersey Jackals; 1998	Northeast League Champions; Brockton Rox; 2003	Succeeded by New Jersey Jackals; 2004
