= Westfield Starfires =

Baseball team

Coordinates: 42°07′25″N 72°45′51″W

- Logo

Information
- League: FCBL (2019-present)
- Location: Westfield, Massachusetts
- Ballpark: Bullens Field
- Founded: 2019
- Colors: Blue, Yellow, Silver
- Mascot: Stanley the Squirrel
- Ownership: Chris Thompson
- Management: Hunter Golden, Vice President, Baseball Operations
- Manager: Paul Bonfiglio
- Website: Official website

The Westfield Starfires are a collegiate summer baseball team based in Westfield, Massachusetts. They play in the Futures Collegiate Baseball League (FCBL), a wood-bat league with a 56-game regular season comprising eight teams from northern Vermont to western Connecticut. The team, owned by Chris Thompson, plays its home games at Bullens Field in Westfield.

== History ==
The Starfires entered the FCBL in 2019, replacing the Martha's Vineyard Sharks, who switched to the New England Collegiate Baseball League. The Starfires name was revealed at a media event in Westfield on February 20, 2019. On March 12, 2019, the club announced that its first field manager would be Bill Sandillo, a native of West Springfield and a former player and captain at American International College.

In 2020, the Futures Collegiate League was one of only two leagues nationally to play baseball during the COVID-19 pandemic; leaving Westfield and its fellow teams as prime destinations for some of College Baseball's best talents. The 2020 team featured future professionals such as Nick Dombkowski of the Pittsburgh Pirates organization and highly rated prospect Reggie Crawford. In spite of its star-power, the Starfires finished one game outside the FCBL playoffs in 2020.

In 2021, The Starfires returned with Tony Deshler as the manager and turned in a strong campaign, shattering the league runs scored record by almost 70 runs, but also managing to miss the playoffs yet again by one game on the final day of the season. While the season ended without a playoff bid, the Starfires produced their first-ever League MVP in Cole Bartels (Penn State) and at one point in the season, had a lineup that featured 9 of the top 13 hitters in the league.

2022 brought with it a managerial change and Tony Deshler stepped down to pursue other opportunities in college baseball and Kyle Dembrowski, a long time assistant, filled the head coach role. The Starfires finally managed to break their playoff-jinx and instead of finding themselves on the outside looking in on the last day of the season as they had the previous two seasons- managed to clinch the final playoff spot on the last day of the regular season - courtesy of a Jackson Hornung (Skidmore) double and a Brandon Jones hard hit infield single to secure their bid. Westfield were later swept in the playoffs by the Vermont Lake Monsters. The Starfires again managed to field over 8 All Stars - holding the highest mark in the league the past three seasons at 26.

== Roster ==
Westfield Starfires roster
| Active roster | | Coaches/Other |
| Pitchers: -- Justin Bowman; -- Owen Callaghan; -- Sean Egan; -- Cam Fisher; -- Nolan Geisler; -- Aidan Gray; -- Cody Hesselton; -- Will Hurley; -- Jake Jachym; -- Connor Jernigan; -- Jacek Krol; -- Dan Margolies; -- Brendan Murphy; -- Jasper Nadel; -- Kai Nee; -- Connor Niemiec; -- Anthony Paolicelli; -- Christian Rasmussen; -- Cole Raymond; -- Traigh Skiffington; -- Greg Strite; -- Bryson Treichel; -- Tanyon Weber; -- Tripp Woytowicz | Catchers: -- Brady Laviolette; -- Cooper Tarantino; -- Jack Taxdahl; -- Josh Toole; Infielders: -- Seth Alford; -- Evan Blake; -- Jimmy Chadwell; -- Trey Hawsey; -- John Mass; -- Evan Menzel; -- Cole Silvia; -- Braeden Sullivan; Outfielders: -- Alex Benevento; -- Sam Downey; -- Caleb Karll; -- Noah Lewis; -- Griffin Mills; -- Anthony Ruggiero; -- Ben Williams | Manager: -- Paul Bonfiglio; Coaches: -- Nate Cormier (assistant); -- Ben Farber (pitching); -- Ryan Molinari (hitting); -- Scott Ross (assistant); Disabled list ‡ Inactive list § Suspended list Roster updated April 30, 2025 |
