= Vermont Lake Monsters =

Collegiate minor league baseball team in Burlington, Vermont

Logo
Cap insignia

Information
- League: FCBL (2021–present)
- Location: Burlington, Vermont (1994–present)
- Ballpark: Centennial Field (1994–present)
- Founded: 1994
- NYPL championships: 4 (1995, 1996, 2011, 2017)
- FCBL championships: 1 (2021)
- NYPL regular season: 1 (1996)
- Former name: Vermont Expos (1994–2005)
- Former league: New York–Penn League (1994–2020)
- Colors: Navy blue, lime green, Columbia blue, white
- Mascot: Champ the lake monster
- Ownership: Chris English/Nos Amours Baseball Club
- Manager: Matt Fincher

The Lake Monsters' mascot, Champ

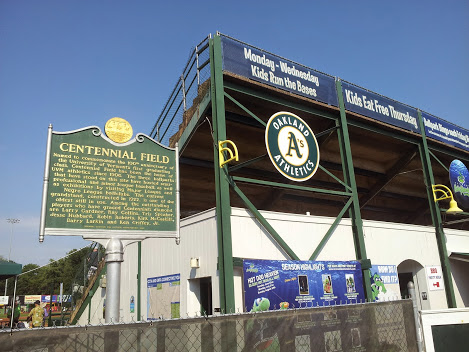
Third base side bleachers at Centennial Field

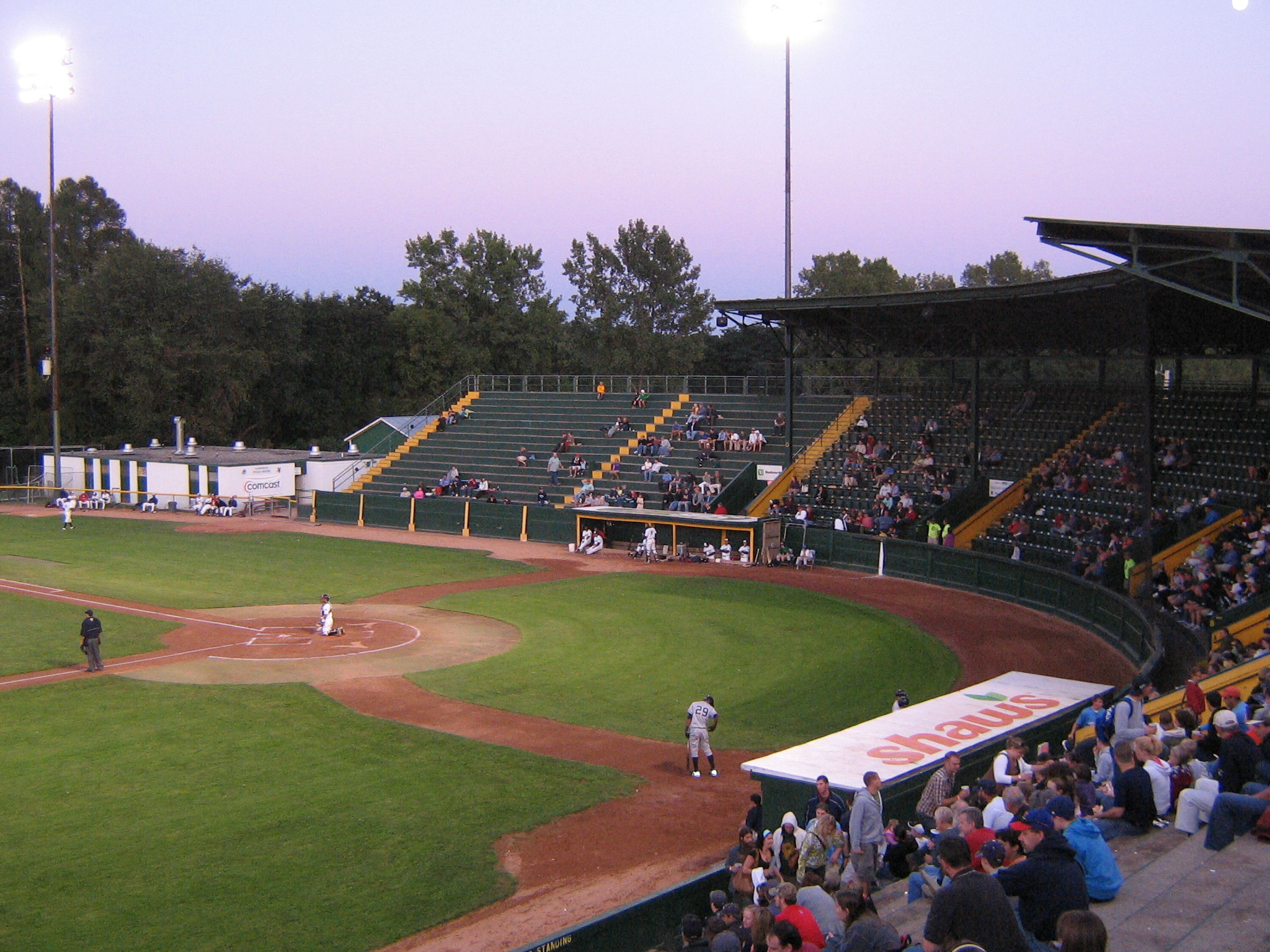
The grandstand at Centennial Field

The Vermont Lake Monsters are a collegiate summer baseball team located in Burlington, Vermont, United States, who were founded in 1994 as the Vermont Expos. They were members of Minor League Baseball, in the New York–Penn League (NYPL), until 2020.

Since their founding in 1994, they have played their home games at Centennial Field, one of the oldest minor league stadiums, on the campus of the University of Vermont.

The team was previously located in Jamestown, New York, (as the Jamestown Expos) from 1977 to 1993. With Major League Baseball's reorganization of the minor leagues after the 2020 season, Vermont was not selected to continue in the minor leagues. Instead, the team joined the Futures Collegiate Baseball League in 2021.

== History ==
=== Early teams ===
The Vermont Lake Monsters were preceded by a Burlington team in the Northeastern League (1887), a Burlington team in the Northern New York League (1903–1905), the Burlington Burlingtons of the Vermont State League/New Hampshire State League (1907), and Burlington A's of the Provincial League during 1955.

After a nearly 30 year gap in between hosting minor league teams, the Vermont Reds and Vermont Mariners of the Eastern League (1984–1988), who directly preceded the Vermont Expos and eventually the Lake Monsters.

=== Montreal Expos (1993–2004) ===
In 1993, Burlington businessman Ray Pecor, Jr., the owner of Lake Champlain Transportation Company in Burlington since 1976, purchased the Jamestown Expos and moved the franchise to Burlington, retaining the Expos name. The Vermont Expos played their first game at Centennial Field on June 16, 1994. More than 5,000 people attended the home opener—a 6–5 loss to the Pittsfield Mets.

=== Washington Nationals (2005–2010) ===
The Montreal Expos announced on September 29, 2004, that they would move to Washington, D.C., after the 2004 season. They would rename themselves the Washington Nationals. Minor League Baseball gives clubs 60 days after the end of the season to change their names and logos. Vermont did not have enough time for an identity change and retained the Expos nickname for the 2005 season.

During the 2005 season, the club announced its plan to change the nickname and solicited suggestions from its fans. The team received 30,000 fan suggestions for the new name via a name-the-team contest. The New York Times reported that the two leading contenders were "Green Mountain Boys" and "Lakemonsters". At the end of the contest, the winning name was "Champs", but as the team had not made the playoffs at that point since 1996, management did not think it was appropriate.

They announced the new name, "Lake Monsters", and revealed the new team colors and uniforms on November 15, 2005. The Expos colors of red, white, and blue were replaced with the Lake Monster colors of navy blue, Columbia blue, and lime green. The name references Champ, the legendary Lake Champlain monster which had been the team's mascot since 1994. The club's last game as the Vermont Expos was on September 8, 2005. They opened the 2006 season as the Vermont Lake Monsters.

==== Expos legacy ====
The franchise was the last professional ball club to carry the Expos name. The team's home ballpark, Centennial Field, is 100 miles (160 km) from the Montreal Expos' last home ballpark Olympic Stadium—closer than the Boston Red Sox' Fenway Park. While baseball fans in Burlington tend to root for the Red Sox, New York Mets, or New York Yankees, Montreal was the closest Major League Baseball team until moving to Washington, D.C., 2005. Fans along the border towns rooted for the Expos until the move.

On July 22, 2005, the Vermont Expos held their first "Tribute to the Expos" promotion and honored Andre Dawson at Centennial Field. While the club changed its name to the "Lake Monsters" in 2006, the organization held its second "tribute to the Expos". The club honored pitcher Dennis Martínez and wore powder-blue Expos uniforms with the Expos name on the front and a Lake Monsters patch on the left sleeve. On August 5, 2007, the Lake Monsters honored the Expos again and brought Tim Wallach to Burlington.

=== Oakland Athletics (2011–2020) ===
Following the 2010 season, the Lake Monsters ended their affiliation with the Nationals and entered into a new player development contract (a working relationship between Major and Minor League teams) with the Oakland Athletics. This marked the first new MLB affiliation in the Lake Monsters' 17-year history. Vermont began its first year as an affiliate of the Oakland A's in June 2011. Ahead of the 2021 season, the Oakland Athletics ended their affiliation with the Lake Monsters, ending the 10-season affiliation with the team.

=== Collegiate (2021–) ===
Following the 2020 season, the whole of Minor League baseball was re-organized and many teams were eliminated. The entire single-A short season New York–Penn League was eliminated. Three league teams moved to the new High A level. The Lake Monsters joined the Futures Collegiate Baseball League, a wooden bat college league. In their inaugural season, the Lake Monsters won the 2021 Futures Collegiate Baseball League championship, defeating the Pittsfield Suns in the 3-game championship series 2–1.

== Playoffs ==
- 1995: Defeated Hudson Valley 2–0 in semifinals; lost to Watertown 2–1 in finals.
- 1996: Defeated Pittsfield 2–0 in semifinals; defeated St. Catharines 2–1 to win championship.
- 2011: Lost to Auburn 2–0 in semifinals.
- 2017: Defeated Mahoning Valley 2–0 in semifinals; lost to Hudson Valley 2–0 in finals.
- 2021: Defeated Worcester Bravehearts 2–0 in semifinals; defeated Pittsfield Suns 2–1 to win Futures Collegiate Baseball League championship
- 2022: Defeated Westfield Starfires 2–0 in semifinals; lost to Nashua Silver Knights 2–1 in the finals.
- 2023: Defeated Worcester Bravehearts 2–1 in semifinals; lost to Norwich Sea Unicorns 1–0 in the finals.
- 2024: Lost to Norwich Sea Unicorns 2–1 in semifinals.
- 2025: Lost to New Britain Bees 2–1 in semifinals.

== Roster ==
Vermont Lake Monsters roster
Active roster	Coaching staff
Pitchers: 29 Jack Birtwell; 31 Emmet Christian; 33 Zach Davis; 52 Jonah Delgado; 13 Bryce DiPiero; 43 Eli Fleming; 30 Nate Fletcher; 10 Sean Gamble; 26 Alvin Gomez; 11 Langdon Hazen; 18 Matt Higgins; 36 Jack Kelleher; 35 Shamus Kelly; 41 Brady Lane; 5 Jack McLaughlin; 39 Landon Miller; 21 Romel Roca; 37 Adam Schwartz; 32 Cole Tarrant; Catchers: 16 Leandro Guevara; 8 Thomas O'Connell; 9 Tommy Popoff; Infielders: 4 Cooper Berry; 7 Nolan Colby; 38 Nick Frontino; 22 Tyler Harmony; 27 Shaun McMillan; 17 Xander Meissner; 14 Bryan Richman; 3 Zander Teator; Outfielders: 34 Aidan Botti; 24 Sam Cavossa; 15 Hunter Kingsbury; 6 Will Mahala; 12 Masai Marshall; 19 Jeremy Sosa; 1 Connor Vercollone	Manager: -- Matt Fincher; Coaches: -- Greg Conley (assistant); -- Chris Richard (assistant); -- Ryan Seaman (assistant); Disabled list; ‡ Inactive list; § Suspended list; Roster updated June 23, 2025

== Notable alumni ==
- Geoff Blum (1994)
- Michael Barrett (1995)
- Orlando Cabrera (1995)
- Jamey Carroll (1996)
- Milton Bradley (1997)
- Jorge Julio (1998)
- Wilson Valdez (1999)
- Jason Bay (2000)
- Brandon Watson (2000)
- Jason Bergmann (2002)
- Darrell Rasner (2002)
- Ian Desmond (2004)
- John Lannan (2005)
- Marco Estrada (2005)
- Michael Martínez (2006)
- Justin Maxwell (2006)
- Cole Kimball (2007)
- Jordan Zimmermann (2007)
- Danny Espinosa (2008)
- Tom Milone (2008)
- Tyler Moore (2008)
- Derek Norris (2008)
- Brad Peacock (2008)
- Steven Souza (2008)
- Sandy León (2009)
- Mitchell Clegg (2009)
- Aaron Barrett (2010)
- A. J. Cole (2010)
- Ryan Mattheus (2010)
- Addison Russell (2012)
- Matt Olson (2012)
- Chad Pinder (2013)
- Seth Brown (2015)
- Sean Murphy (2016)
- A.J. Puk (2016)
- Jesus Luzardo (2017)
- Alfonso Rivas (2018)
- Jordan Diaz (2019)
