= Akron RubberDucks =

Minor league baseball team in Akron, Ohio (founded in 1923)

- Founded in 1923 in Binghamton, New York; Based in Akron, Ohio since 1997
Team logo
Cap insignia

Minor league affiliations
- Class: Double-A (1967–present)
- Previous classes: Class A (1964–1966); Class AA (1963); Class A (1933–1962); Class B (1923–1932)
- League: Eastern League (1967–present)
- Division: Southwest Division
- Previous leagues: New York–Penn League (1964–1966); Eastern League (1938–1963); New York–Penn League (1923–1937)

Major league affiliations
- Team: Cleveland Indians / Guardians (1989–present)
- Previous teams: Seattle Mariners (1988); Cincinnati Reds (1984–1987); Pittsburgh Pirates (1983); Oakland Athletics (1980–1982); New York Yankees (1965–1979, 1932–1961); Milwaukee Braves (1964); Kansas City Athletics (1962–1963)

Minor league titles
- League titles (23): 1929; 1933; 1935; 1940; 1944; 1949; 1952; 1953; 1965; 1967; 1972; 1976; 1977; 1979; 1984; 1985; 1986; 2003; 2005; 2009; 2012; 2016; 2021
- Division titles (16): 1972; 1976; 1977; 1979; 1982; 1983; 1992; 1998; 2002; 2003; 2005; 2006; 2009; 2012; 2016; 2021
- Second-half titles (1): 2024

Team data
- Name: Akron RubberDucks (2014–present)
- Previous names: Akron Aeros (1997–2013); Canton–Akron Indians (1989–1996); Vermont Mariners (1988); Vermont Reds (1984–1987); Lynn Pirates (1983); Lynn Sailors (1980–1982); West Haven Yankees (1972–1979); Manchester Yankees (1969–1971); Binghamton Triplets (1923–1968)
- Colors: Tire black, blue flame, fire orange, racing yellow, white
- Mascot: Orbit (1997–present); Homer (2011–present); Webster (2014–present); Rubberta (2016–present)
- Ballpark: 7 17 Credit Union Park (1997–present)
- Previous parks: Thurman Munson Memorial Stadium (1989–1996); Centennial Field (1984–1988); Fraser Field (1980–1983); Quigley Stadium (1972–1979); Gill Stadium (1969–1971); Johnson Field (1923–1968)
- Owner/ Operator: Prospector Baseball Group
- General manager: Noel Blaha
- Manager: Greg DiCenzo
- Website: milb.com/akron

The Akron RubberDucks are a Minor League Baseball team based in Akron, Ohio. The team plays in the Eastern League and is the Double-A affiliate of the Cleveland Guardians. They play in 7 17 Credit Union Park, located in downtown Akron, which seats 7,630 fans. The nickname "RubberDucks" refers to Akron's history in the rubber industry, in particular as the birthplace of tire and rubber companies such as Goodyear, Firestone, B.F. Goodrich, and General Tire.

== History ==
The franchise began as the Binghamton Triplets, a charter member of the New York–Penn League in 1923. They played in Binghamton, New York, at Johnson Field, winning 10 titles over their 46 seasons. After the 1968 season, Boston businessman John Alevizos acquired the franchise and moved it to Gill Stadium in Manchester, New Hampshire, to become the Manchester Yankees. After three seasons in Manchester, the franchise then relocated to West Haven, Connecticut, under new ownership, and became the West Haven Yankees, playing at Quigley Stadium. In West Haven, the franchise won four Eastern League titles in eight seasons. After the 1979 season, the franchise then moved to Lynn, Massachusetts, to become the Lynn Sailors, playing at Fraser Field.

In 1981, Mike Agganis purchased the team for $48,000. For the 1983 season, the team rebranded as the Pirates, due to their one-year affiliation with the Pittsburgh Pirates. After the 1983 season, the franchise moved to Burlington, Vermont, and became the Vermont Reds, playing at Centennial Field. As the Reds, the franchise won three more Eastern League titles in five seasons. In 1988, they were known as the Vermont Mariners, again due to a change in their major league affiliate. After the 1988 season, the franchise moved to Canton, Ohio. It became the Canton–Akron Indians, playing at newly opened Thurman Munson Memorial Stadium and changing affiliation to the Cleveland Indians, an affiliation they would keep for years to come.

=== Akron Aeros ===
In the early-1990's, then-Akron, Ohio mayor Don Plusquellic made it a priority to bring a stadium to downtown Akron. Plusquellic chose a 8.2-acre (3.3 ha) site situated between South Main Street and the Ohio and Erie Canal. After conversations with Agganis to initially relocate the team to Akron in 1987 did not materialize, a deal was reached on November 22, 1994 with Agganis for a $20 million, 8,500-seat baseball stadium in downtown Akron. Poor field drainage at Thurman Munson Memorial Stadium was cited as one of the reasons for the relocation.

In anticipation of the move, the team considered several new names, with "Blast" serving as the initial selection. The community rejected this name as Akron native Judy Resnik was killed in the Space Shuttle Challenger explosion in 1986. "Spirit" and "Quest" were also considered before "Aeros" was ultimately chosen due to Ohio's relevant history in aerospace. The Aeros debuted on Opening Day on April 10, 1997. With 9,086 fans in attendance, the Aeros and Harrisburg Senators played the first game at Canal Park, which would later be named 7 17 Credit Union Park due to a sponsorship agreement. The Aeros finished their first season with a record of 51–90. Despite holding the last-place record, the team drew a Double-A league-leading 473,272 fans that season. The Aeros' opening day pitcher that year, Jaret Wright, would pitch for the Cleveland Indians later that year in the World Series and finish second in American League Rookie of the Year voting.

The following year, the Aeros put together a 30-game "worst-to-first" turnaround; after finishing the prior year 34½ games back, they proceeded to win the Southern Division in 1998 by 8½ games. However, after losing in the playoffs that year, it would be three more years until the Aeros found their way back to the postseason.

On September 6, 1999, the Aeros set an Eastern League attendance record for three consecutive seasons. They once again led all Double-A teams after 522,459 fans attended 17 games at Canal Park in 1999.

In 2002, the team posted a 93–48 record, the third-highest win total in the Eastern League in 50 years. Their success continued, as they won two league championships (their first since moving to Ohio) in 2003 and 2005. In 2006, the Aeros again posted the best regular-season record in the league, but lost the playoff title to the Portland Sea Dogs after taking the series to a deciding fifth game.

From 2005 to 2008, the Aeros advanced to the Eastern League Championship Series (ELCS). Although the Aeros won the ELCS in 2005, they were defeated in three consecutive trips from 2006 to 2008.

In 2009, the Aeros again advanced to the league championship and defeated the Connecticut Defenders (three games to one), capping a 95-win season and their third title in the last seven years. Jared Head was named the playoff MVP.

In their first three seasons in Canal Park, the Aeros led all of Double-A in attendance, becoming the first team at that level to draw a half-million fans in a single season.

For the 2011 season, Homer, a large purple pigeon, was added as a secondary mascot to Orbit.

Mike Agganis sold the team to Ken Babby in October 2012.

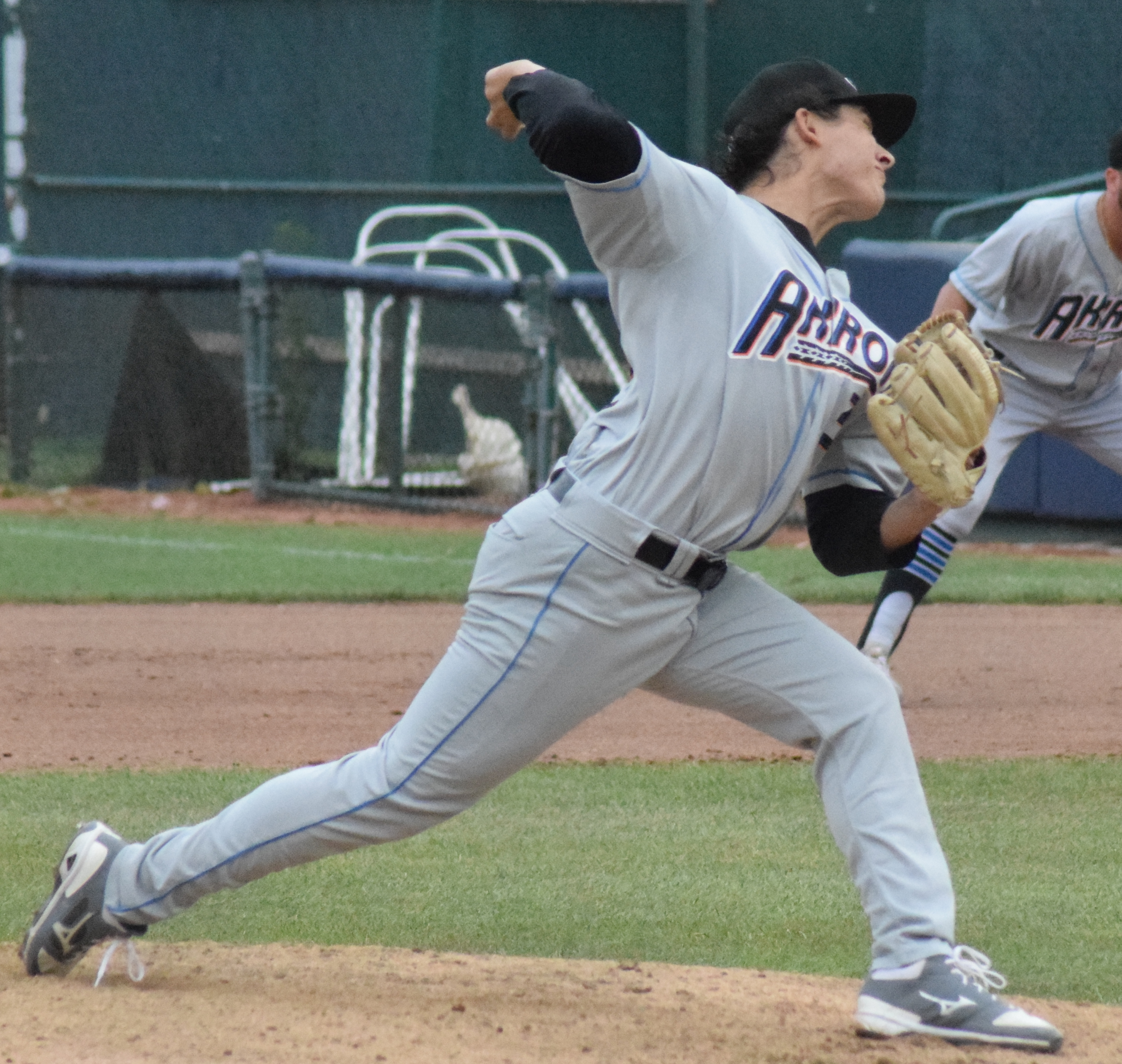
Eli Morgan with the RubberDucks in 2019

=== RubberDucks rebrand ===
On October 29, 2013, the Aeros changed their name to the Akron RubberDucks, paying homage to Akron as the original "Rubber Capital of the World" and celebrating the family entertainment aspect of Minor League Baseball. The team introduced a color scheme of Blue Flame, Racing Yellow, Fire Orange and Tire Black, the first team in professional baseball to hold this combination. Webster was announced as a new mascot of the team, joining Orbit and Homer that were carried over from the Aeros branding.

At the conclusion of the 2014 season, the RubberDucks were awarded the "Best New Logo/Branding" from Ballpark Digest. The team also recognized a 15.7% year-over-year attendance increase following the rebrand, totaling 350,704 people across 68 games.

The organization added a fourth mascot in 2016, a female duck named Rubberta. Later that year, the RubberDucks won their first Eastern League Championship under the new name, sweeping the Trenton Thunder, 3–0. Akron also hosted the 2016 Eastern League All-Star Game at Canal Park.

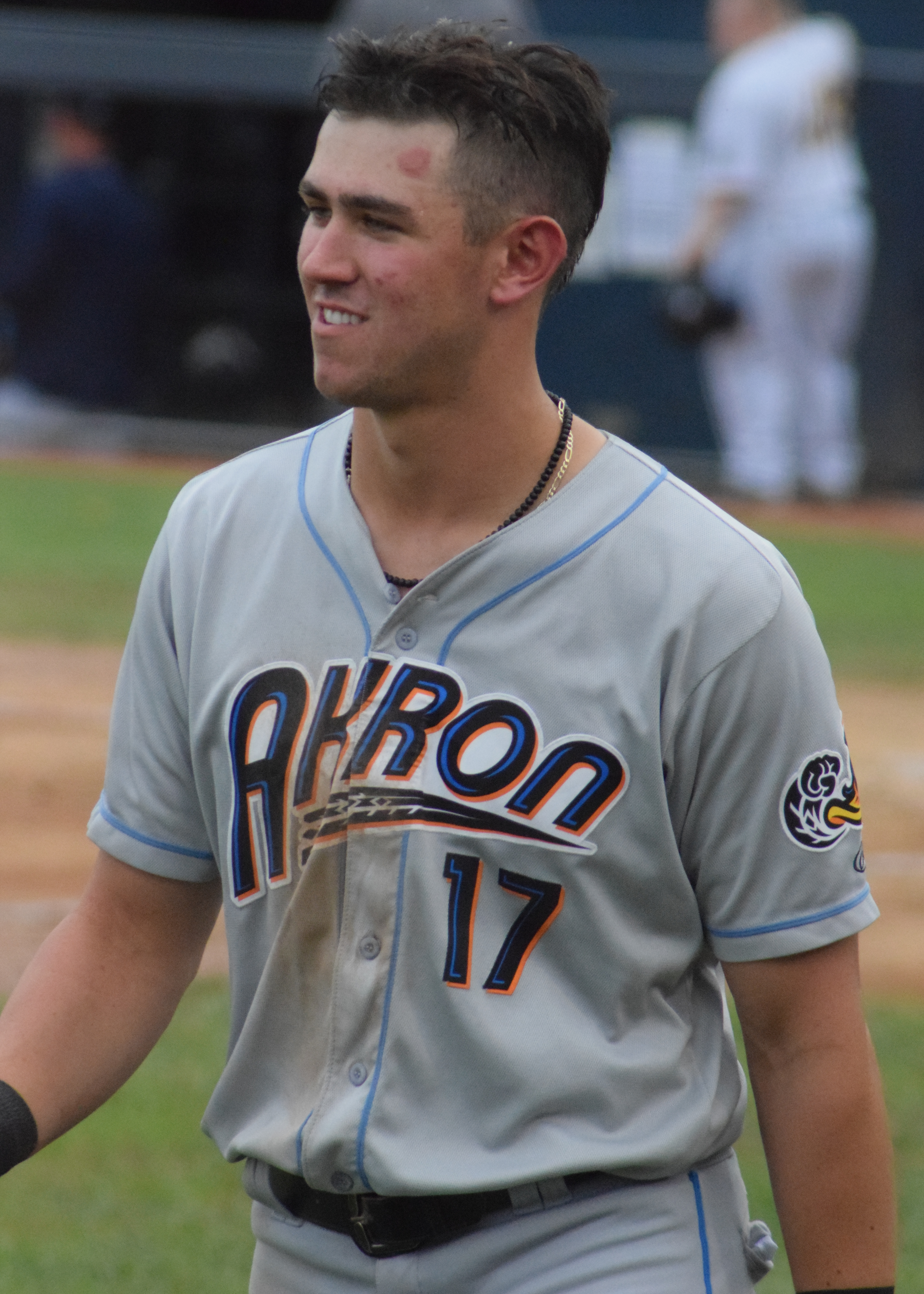
Nolan Jones with the RubberDucks in 2019

In conjunction with Major League Baseball's restructuring of Minor League Baseball in 2021, the RubberDucks were placed into the Double-A Northeast. They won the Southwest Division title with a 73–46 record. They qualified for the championship playoffs by possessing the league's best record. Akron defeated the Bowie Baysox, 3–0, in the best-of-five series to win the Double-A Northeast championship. Rouglas Odor was selected as the league's Manager of the Year. In 2022, the Double-A Northeast reverted to the Eastern League name, the name historically used by the regional circuit prior to 2021.

Ken Babby sold the team to the Prospector Baseball Group in December 2025.

== Season-by-season results ==
- 1997: 51–90 (5th), manager Jeff Datz
- 1998: 81–60 (1st), manager Joel Skinner • Lost to Harrisburg 3–1 in first round of playoffs
- 1999: 69–71 (5th), manager Joel Skinner
- 2000: 75–68 (3rd), manager Eric Wedge
- 2001: 68–74 (3rd), manager Chris Bando
- 2002: 93–48 (1st), manager Brad Komminsk • Lost to Harrisburg 3–2 in first round of playoffs
- 2003: 88–53 (1st), manager Brad Komminsk • Defeated Altoona 3–1 in first round of playoffs; defeated New Haven 3–0 in ELCS
- 2004: 63–78 (5th), manager Brad Komminsk
- 2005: 84–58 (1st), manager Torey Lovullo • Defeated Altoona 3–2 in first round of playoffs; defeated Portland 3–1 in ELCS
- 2006: 87–55 (1st), manager Tim Bogar • Defeated Altoona 3–2 in first round of playoffs; lost to Portland 3–2 in ELCS
- 2007: 80–61 (2nd), manager Tim Bogar • Defeated Erie 3–1 in first round of playoffs; lost to Trenton 3–1 in ELCS
- 2008: 80–62 (2nd), manager Mike Sarbaugh • Defeated Bowie 3–1 in first round of playoffs; lost to Trenton 3–1 in ELCS
- 2009: 89–53 (1st), manager Mike Sarbaugh • Defeated Reading 3–0 in first round of playoffs; defeated Connecticut 3–1 in ELCS
- 2010: 71–71 (4th), manager Joel Skinner
- 2011: 73–69 (4th), manager Chris Tremie
- 2012: 82–59 (1st), manager Chris Tremie • Defeated Baysox 3–2 in first round of playoffs; defeated Trenton 3–1 in ELCS
- 2013: 68–73 (5th), manager Edwin Rodriguez
- 2014: 73–69 (2nd), manager Dave Wallace
- 2015: 73–69 (4th), manager Dave Wallace
- 2016: 77–64 (1st), manager Dave Wallace • Defeated Altoona 3–1 in first round of playoffs; defeated Trenton 3–0 in ELCS
- 2017: 69–71 (3rd), manager Mark Budzinski
- 2018: 78–62 (2nd), manager Tony Mansolino • Defeated Altoona 3–1 in first round of playoffs; lost to New Hampshire 3–0 in ELCS
- 2019: 61–79 (5th), manager Rouglas Odor
- 2020: Season canceled due to COVID-19 pandemic
- 2021: 73–46 (1st), manager Rouglas Odor • Defeated Bowie 3–0 in Double-A Northeast Championship Series
- 2022: 79–59 (2nd), manager Rouglas Odor
- 2023: 65–73 (5th), manager Rouglas Odor
- 2024: 80–58 (1st), manager Greg DiCenzo • Lost to Erie 2–1 in first round of playoffs
- 2025: 77–60 (2nd), manager Greg DiCenzo
- 2026: 68–68 (4th), manager Greg DiCenzo

Note: Place indicates finish in Eastern League's Northern Division from 1980 to 1982; in division-less Eastern League from 1983 to 1993; in Eastern League's Southern Division from 1994 to 2009; in Eastern League's Western Division from 2010 to 2020; in Double-A Northeast/Eastern League's Southwest Division in 2021 to present.

== Notoriety ==
Over the off-season between the 2010–2011 season, the Aeros received national attention after introducing many new promotions as well as menu items at Canal Park. The team was featured in a segment titled "Back in Black" during The Daily Show performed by comedian Lewis Black. In the segment, Black talks about several of the menu items including The "Three Dog Night" consisting of a hot dog in a Bratwurst in a Kielbasa, and "The Nice to Meat You Burger". The food was also covered by CNBC Sports reporter Darren Rovell.

== Media ==
Games are broadcast on WHLO AM 640 and iHeartRadio's app. The team's broadcasters are Jim Clark, in his 32nd year in 2025, and Marco LaNave.

== Attendance ==
On August 12, 2017, the RubberDucks reported their highest single-game attendance since rebranding, 8,396 fans.

Season	Total attendance	League rank	Total openings	Average attendance per opening	Average attendance per Eastern League opening
1997	473,232	1st	67	7,063	4,260
1998	521,122	1st	70	7,445	4,334
1999	522,459	1st	69	7,572	4,954
2000	481,060	1st	66	7,289	4,147
2001	485,582	1st	69	7,037	4,294
2002	400,187	3rd	67	5,973	4,284
2003	445,603	2nd	67	6,651	4,128
2004	478,611	1st	68	7,038	4,399
2005	455,056	2nd	66	6,894	4,468
2006	412,995	3rd	65	6,354	4,353
2007	355,376	6th	64	5,553	4,831
2008	342,816	7th	67	5,117	4,570
2009	316,836	6th	68	4,659	4,612
2010	261,563	9th	69	3,791	4,796
2011	266,265	9th	68	3,916	4,868
2012	256,473	9th	68	3,772	4,669
2013	295,459	7th	70	4,221	4,616
2014	350,704	4th	68	5,157	4,609
2015	340,916	6th	68	5,013	4,579
2016	350,077	4th	69	5,074	4,259
2017	343,351	6th	66	5,202	4,773
2018	344,754	6th	68	4,996	4,793

== Roster ==
Akron RubberDucks roster
Players	Coaches/Other
Pitchers: 28 Ryan Degges; 44 Dylan DeLucia; 34 Braylon Doughty; 40 Jay Driver; 41 Magnus Ellerts; 38 Caden Favors; 22 Franklin Gómez; 49 Zach Jacobs; 30 Michael Kennedy; 46 Sean Matson; 32 Zane Morehouse; 37 Carter Rustad; 39 Rafe Schlesinger; 45 Cam Schuelke; 36 Adam Tulloch; 29 Cam Walty; Catchers: 10 Logun Clark; 12 Bennett Thompson; Infielders: 8 Maick Collado ~; 27 Dean Curley; 1 Jake Fox; 31 Welbyn Francisca; 9 Luke Hill; 6 Christian Knapczyk; 2 Alex Mooney; 7 Kevin Rivas; 24 Nolan Schubart; Outfielders: 4 Ryan Cesarini; 11 Jaison Chourio; 17 Jace LaViolette; 15 Aaron Walton	Manager: 26 Greg DiCenzo; Coaches: 55 Angus Adams (pitching); 48 Jordan Becker (hitting); 47 Gustavo Nava (development); 43 Cole Nieto (hitting); 54 Michael Poole (pitching); 33 Yan Rivera (bench); 60-day injured list: -- Rodney Boone (full-season); -- Kyle Dernedde; -- José Devers; -- Matt Jachec; -- Carter Spivey (full-season); -- Khal Stephen; 7-day injured list; * On Cleveland Guardians 40-man roster; ~ Development list; # Rehab assignment; ∞ Reserve list; ‡ Restricted list; § Suspended list; † Temporarily inactive list; Roster updated September 8, 2026; Transactions; → More rosters: MiLB • Eastern League; → Cleveland Guardians minor league players
