= 1995 Chicago Cubs season =

1995 Chicago Cubs
- League: National League
- Division: Central
- Ballpark: Wrigley Field
- City: Chicago
- Record: 73–71 (.507)
- Divisional place: 3rd
- Owners: Tribune Company
- General managers: Ed Lynch
- Managers: Jim Riggleman
- Television: WGN-TV/Superstation WGN/CLTV (Harry Caray, Steve Stone, Thom Brennaman)
- Radio: WGN (Thom Brennaman, Ron Santo, Harry Caray)
- Stats: ESPN.com; Baseball Reference

The 1995 Chicago Cubs season was the 124th season of the Chicago Cubs franchise, the 120th in the National League and the 80th at Wrigley Field. The Cubs finished third in the National League Central with a record of 73–71. This season also marks the 50th anniversary of their last National league pennant of 1945.

== Offseason ==
- December 2, 1994: Dave Otto was released by the Chicago Cubs.

== Regular season ==
The Cubs pitching staff did well during the regular season, leading all 28 teams in shutouts, with 12.

=== Season standings ===
NL Central
Team	W	L	Pct.	GB	Home	Road
Cincinnati Reds	85	59	.590	—	44‍–‍28	41‍–‍31
Houston Astros	76	68	.528	9	36‍–‍36	40‍–‍32
Chicago Cubs	73	71	.507	12	34‍–‍38	39‍–‍33
St. Louis Cardinals	62	81	.434	22½	39‍–‍33	23‍–‍48
Pittsburgh Pirates	58	86	.403	27	31‍–‍41	27‍–‍45

=== Record vs. opponents ===
1995 National League record Source: MLB Standings Grid – 1995
Team	ATL	CHC	CIN	COL	FLA	HOU	LAD	MON	NYM	PHI	PIT	SD	SF	STL
Atlanta	—	8–4	8–5	9–4	10–3	6–6	5–4	9–4	5–8	7–6	4–2	5–2	7–1	7–5
Chicago	4–8	—	3–7	6–7	8–4	5–8	7–5	3–5	4–3	6–1	8–5	5–7	5–7	9–4
Cincinnati	5–8	7–3	—	5–7	6–6	12–1	4–3	8–4	7–5	9–3	8–5	3–6	3–3	8–5
Colorado	4–9	7–6	7–5	—	5–7	4–4	4–9	7–1	5–4	4–2	8–4	9–4	8–5	5–7
Florida	3–10	4–8	6–6	7–5	—	8–4	3–7	6–7	7–6	6–7	5–8	3–2	5–3	4–3
Houston	6–6	8–5	1–12	4–4	4–8	—	3–2	9–3	6–6	5–7	9–4	7–4	5–3	9–4
Los Angeles	4–5	5–7	3–4	9–4	7–3	2–3	—	7–5	6–6	4–9	9–4	7–6	8–5	7–5
Montreal	4–9	5–3	4–8	1–7	7–6	3–9	5–7	—	7–6	8–5	4–4	7–5	7–6	4–3
New York	8–5	3–4	5–7	4–5	6–7	6–6	6–6	6–7	—	7–6	4–3	6–7	5–8	3–4
Philadelphia	6-7	1–6	3–9	2–4	7–6	7–5	9–4	5–8	6–7	—	6–3	6–6	6–6	5–4
Pittsburgh	2–4	5–8	5–8	4–8	8–5	4–9	4–9	4–4	3–4	3–6	—	4–8	6–6	6–7
San Diego	2–5	7–5	6–3	4–9	2–3	4–7	6–7	5–7	7–6	6–6	8–4	—	6–7	7–5
San Francisco	1–7	7–5	3–3	5–8	3–5	3–5	5–8	6–7	8–5	6–6	6–6	7–6	—	7–6
St. Louis	5–7	4–9	5–8	7–5	3–4	4-9	5–7	3–4	4–3	4–5	7–6	5–7	6–7	—

=== Notable transactions ===
- April 5, 1995: Brian McRae was traded by the Kansas City Royals to the Chicago Cubs for Derek Wallace and Geno Morones (minors).
- May 24, 1995: Felix Jose was signed as a free agent with the Chicago Cubs.
- May 26, 1995: Karl Rhodes was selected off waivers by the Boston Red Sox from the Chicago Cubs.
- June 1, 1995: Kerry Wood was drafted by the Chicago Cubs in the 1st round (4th pick) of the 1995 amateur draft. Player signed July 28, 1995.
- June 1, 1995: Felix Jose was released by the Chicago Cubs.

=== Roster ===
1995 Chicago Cubs roster
Roster
Pitchers: 51 Terry Adams; 27 Willie Banks; 52 Jim Bullinger; 55 Larry Casian; 49 Frank Castillo; 33 Tom Edens; 32 Kevin Foster; 57 Rich Garces; 41 Bryan Hickerson; 36 Mike Morgan; 28 Randy Myers; 53 Chris Nabholz; 38 Jaime Navarro; 47 Mike Perez; 41 Roberto Rivera; 34 Tanyon Sturtze; 36 Dave Swartzbaugh; 46 Steve Trachsel; 39 Mike Walker; 13 Turk Wendell; 16 Anthony Young	Catchers: 6 Mike Hubbard; 7 Joe Kmak; 8 Mark Parent; 8 Todd Pratt; 9 Scott Servais; 2 Rick Wilkins; Infielders: 24 Steve Buechele; 12 Shawon Dunston; 17 Mark Grace; 15 Matt Franco; 24 Todd Haney; 18 José Hernández; 20 Howard Johnson; 11 Rey Sánchez; 27 Todd Zeile	Outfielders: 10 Scott Bullett; 25 Luis Gonzalez; 56 Brian McRae; 25 Karl Rhodes; 19 Kevin Roberson; 21 Sammy Sosa; 30 Ozzie Timmons	Manager: 5 Jim Riggleman; Coaches: 43 Dave Bialas (bullpen); 31 Fergie Jenkins (pitching); 40 Tony Muser (hitting); 3 Mako Oliveras (first base); 42 Dan Radison (third base); 26 Billy Williams (bench)

== Player stats ==
=== Batting ===
==== Starters by position ====
Note: Pos = Position; G = Games played; AB = At bats; H = Hits; Avg. = Batting average; HR = Home runs; RBI = Runs batted in

Pos	Player	G	AB	H	Avg.	HR	RBI
C	Scott Servais	52	175	50	.286	12	35
1B	Mark Grace	143	552	180	.326	16	92
2B	Rey Sánchez	114	428	119	.278	3	27
SS	Shawon Dunston	127	477	141	.296	14	69
3B	Todd Zeile	79	299	68	.227	9	30
LF	Luis Gonzalez	77	262	76	.290	7	34
CF	Brian McRae	137	580	167	.288	12	48
RF	Sammy Sosa	144	564	151	.268	36	119

==== Other batters ====
Note: G = Games played; AB = At bats; H = Hits; Avg. = Batting average; HR = Home runs; RBI = Runs batted in

Player	G	AB	H	Avg.	HR	RBI
José Hernández	93	245	60	.245	13	40
Ozzie Timmons	77	171	45	.263	8	28
Howard Johnson	87	169	33	.195	7	22
Rick Wilkins	50	162	31	.191	6	14
Scott Bullett	104	150	41	.273	3	22
Steve Buechele	32	106	20	.189	1	9
Todd Haney	25	73	30	.411	2	6
Todd Pratt	25	60	8	.133	0	4
Joe Kmak	19	53	13	.245	1	6
Kevin Roberson	32	38	7	.184	4	6
Mark Parent	12	32	8	.250	3	5
Mike Hubbard	15	23	4	.174	0	1
Matt Franco	16	17	5	.294	0	1
Tuffy Rhodes	13	16	2	.125	0	2

=== Pitching ===
= Indicates team leader

= Indicates league leader

==== Starting pitchers ====
Note: G = Games pitched; IP = Innings pitched; W = Wins; L = Losses; ERA = Earned run average; SO = Strikeouts

Player	G	IP	W	L	ERA	SO
Jaime Navarro	29	200.1	14	6	3.28	128
Frank Castillo	29	188.0	11	10	3.21	135
Kevin Foster	30	167.2	12	11	4.51	146
Steve Trachsel	30	160.2	7	13	5.15	117
Jim Bullinger	24	150.0	12	8	4.14	93
Mike Morgan	4	24.2	2	1	2.19	15

==== Relief pitchers ====
Note: G = Games pitched; W = Wins; L = Losses; SV = Saves; ERA = Earned run average; SO = Strikeouts

Player	G	W	L	SV	ERA	SO
Randy Myers	57	1	2	38	3.88	59
Mike Pérez	68	2	6	2	3.66	49
Turk Wendell	43	3	1	0	4.92	50
Mike Walker	42	1	3	1	3.22	20
Larry Casian	42	1	0	0	1.93	11
Bryan Hickerson	38	2	3	1	6.82	28
Chris Nabholz	34	0	1	0	5.40	21
Anthony Young	32	3	4	2	3.70	15
Terry Adams	18	1	1	1	6.50	15
Willie Banks	10	0	1	0	15.43	9
Rich Garcés	7	0	0	0	3.27	6
Dave Swartzbaugh	7	0	0	0	0.00	5
Roberto Rivera	7	0	0	0	5.40	2
Tom Edens	5	1	0	0	6.00	2
Tanyon Sturtze	2	0	0	0	9.00	0

== Farm system ==
Level	Team	League	Manager
AAA	Iowa Cubs	American Association	Ron Clark
AA	Orlando Cubs	Southern League	Bruce Kimm
A	Daytona Cubs	Florida State League	Dave Trembley
A	Rockford Cubbies	Midwest League	Steve Roadcap
A-Short Season	Williamsport Cubs	New York–Penn League	Oneri Fleita
Rookie	GCL Cubs	Gulf Coast League	Sandy Alomar Sr.

LEAGUE CHAMPIONS: Daytona
