= Centennial Field =

Baseball stadium at the University of Vermont, United States

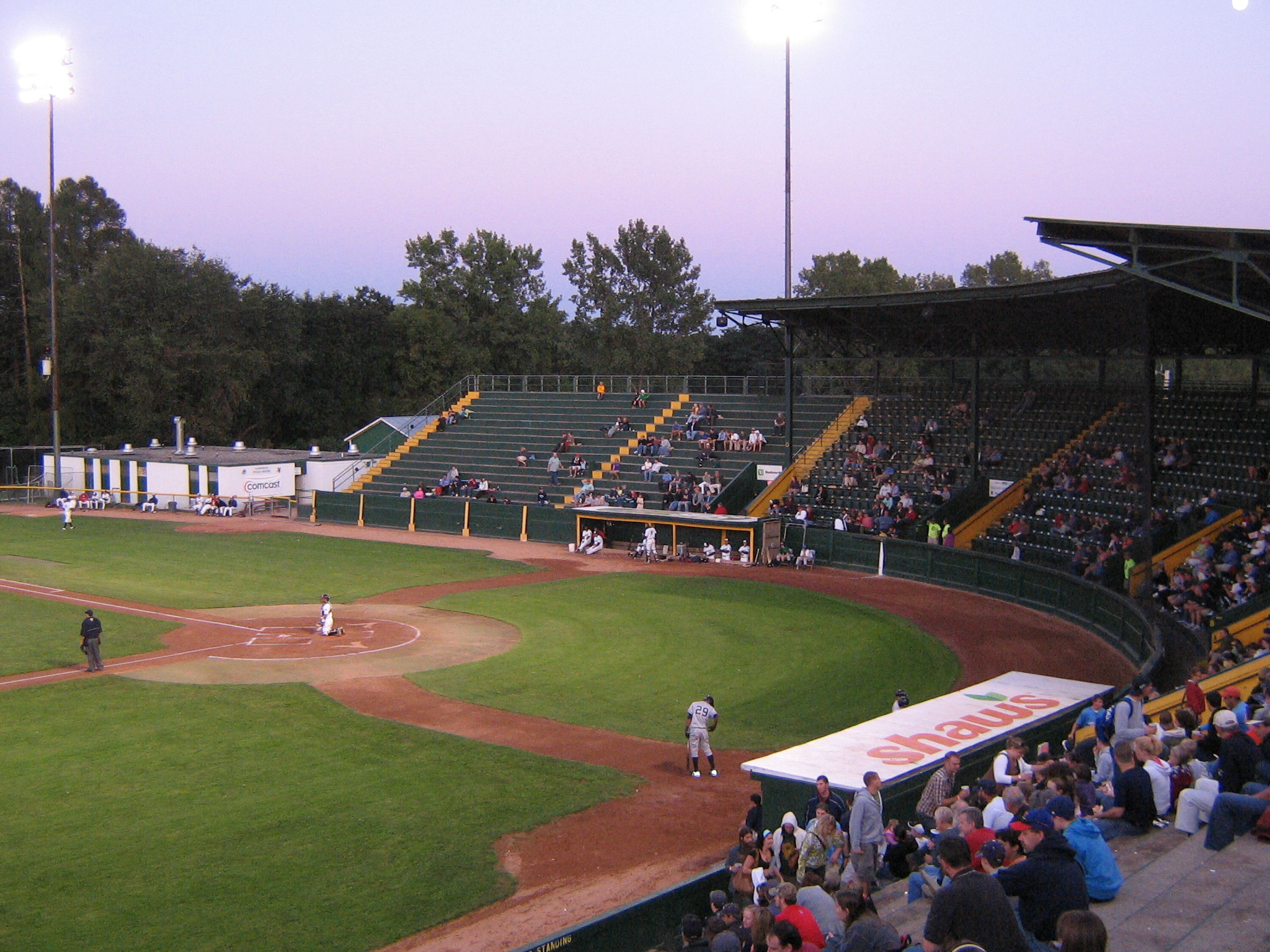
- The stadium during a game in 2009

- Location within Vermont Location within the United States
- Interactive map of Centennial Field
- Full name: Delta Dental Diamond at Centennial Field
- Address: University Road; Burlington, Vermont; United States
- Coordinates: 44°28′54″N 73°11′16″W
- Owner: City of Burlington, Vermont
- Operator: UV Athletics
- Capacity: 4,415
- Type: Ballpark
- Surface: Grass
- Field size: Left Field: 330 feet Center Field: 405 feet Right Field: 323 feet
- Current use: Baseball

Construction
- Groundbreaking: 1906
- Opened: April 17, 1906
- Renovated: 1922
- Expanded: 1995
- Architects: Levering & Garigues, Co.

Tenants
- Baseball: Vermont Expos/Vermont Lake Monsters (NYPL/FCBL) (1994–present); Vermont Catamounts (1906–1917, 1919–1942, 1946–1971, 1978–2009); Burlington Cardinals (NoL) (1935–1941, 1946–1952); Burlington Athletics (1955); Vermont Reds (EL) (1984–1987) Vermont Mariners (EL) (1988); AEC baseball tournament (2003, 2005, 2006); Soccer: America East Conference women's final (1996–97)

Delta Dental Diamond at Centennial Field is the name of the baseball stadium at the University of Vermont in Burlington, Vermont, and is the home of the Vermont Lake Monsters.

Beyond the left-field fence is the former home of the University of Vermont's men's and women's soccer teams, which also served as home field for its men's and women's lacrosse teams, and its college football team (1900–1974).

== History ==
The facility takes its name, Centennial Field, from the fact that the land on which it was built was dedicated to its current purpose on July 6, 1904, at the conclusion of the three-day celebration of the 100th anniversary of the first graduating class of the University of Vermont (UVM). Its first baseball game was on April 17, 1906, with UVM's 10–4 victory over the University of Maine. Larry Gardner was the first batter for UVM. Future-Boston Red Sox pitcher Ray Collins started the game for Vermont and threw the first pitch at the ballpark. Gardner and Collins are among 11 former Catamounts to reach the major leagues, the latest being Matt Duffy, who played for UVM during 2008–2009 and for the Houston Astros during 2015–2016.

In addition to the baseball field, the adjacent soccer field was used by UVM's college football team until 1974, and UVM's men's and women's lacrosse teams in the 1990s through 2006. The school's men's soccer team played there from 1975 to 2011 and the women played there from 1995 to 2011 before moving to Virtue Field on campus. The Centennial Field soccer stands had 5,000 seats and drew America East record crowds during the 1989 postseason when UVM advanced to the NCAA Men's Soccer Championship East Regional Finals with wins over Yale and UConn. Vermont hosted the long-running Smith Barney Men's Soccer Classic at Centennial Field that featured many national powers including UCLA, Stanford, Old Dominion, San Francisco, New Mexico and North Carolina. Its recent women's soccer tournament has featured Indiana, Notre Dame and Villanova.

During the era that Catamounts had a football team, Centennial Field had stands on both sides of the gridiron. UVM's game with UMass in 1966 had a record crowd of 10,000 fans. That season, Vermont featured Little All-American halfback Bobby Mitchell and UMass had future NFL quarterback Greg Landry. The football field was also the home to several Vermont high school state championship games.

The baseball park was part of the sports complex constructed as part of the UVM Centennial celebration. The original wooden baseball bleachers burned on March 12, 1913. The current concrete and steel main grandstand was erected in 1922. Today, it seats 4,415 for baseball.

The first UVM ice hockey game was played on the football portion of Centennial Field. The field's large foul territory comes from the running track that at one time circled the park, including the area where the grandstand currently stands.

In the summer of 2005, Centennial Field was the Vermont stop on ESPN's "50 States in 50 Days" tour. In 2007, it was recognized by ESPN.com's Jim Caple as one of the top 10 ballpark destinations in the U.S. It is also featured in the 2008 book 101 Baseball Places To See Before You Strike Out by Josh Pahigian.

In May 2025 the Lake Monsters and Delta Dental reached a 10-year agreement to refer to the ballpark as Delta Dental Diamond at Centennial Field.

=== Operation and improvements ===
Centennial Field showed its age and was in need of repair in 2010 to meet minor league baseball ballpark standards. Much needed upgrades began in earnest after that season with Vermont Lake Monsters owner Ray Pecor investing in over $1 million in improvements prior to the start of the 2012 season, and another $1 million prior to 2013. Pecor made these improvements –including new lights, a state-of-the-art video scoreboard and many field-surface improvements after agreeing with then-UVM president John Bramley on a 20-year lease just $1 per year.

On June 28, 2012, Oakland extended its minor league player development contract through the end of the 2014 season. In the announcement Athletics vice president and general manager Billy Beane was quoted as saying, "The baseball history and community support in Burlington makes it a very special place. We look forward to this partnership growing for many years to come."

== Baseball usage ==
In 2003, 2005, and 2006, the field hosted the America East Conference baseball tournament. In the past, it also hosted American Legion Baseball and was home to the American Legion Northeast Regional tournament in 2007.

On February 20, 2009, it lost its longest tenant with director of athletics Dr. Robert Corran announcing the University of Vermont would discontinue the varsity baseball (and varsity softball) program following the completion of the 2009 season. Corran said at the time that he expected that the university would continue to maintain the baseball field before Bramley stepped in by leasing it to the Lake Monsters for 20 years starting in 2012. The UVM baseball team played its last home game of the 2009 season at Centennial Field on May 12, 2009, when they hosted Bryant University in a midweek non-conference doubleheader.

With the movement of UVM's soccer facility to Virtue Field after the 2011 season, baseball became the primary sport played at Centennial Field. In addition to the Lake Monsters, the Vermont Principals' Association's four state championship games returned to Centennial Field in 2012 after a two-year absence.

=== Professional baseball franchises ===
Centennial Field has been home to affiliated minor league and summer collegiate baseball teams through the years.

==== Burlington Athletics ====
Dr. Clarence Beecher, a one-time mayor of Burlington and dean of the UVM College of Medicine, led a group that brought the Philadelphia Athletics' Provincial League Class C team to play at Centennial Field in 1955, Vermont's first affiliated minor league team. The Provincial League was founded in 1935 and based in Quebec. The League was affiliated with the National Association from 1940 to 1943 and 1950 to 1955. Between 1950 and 1955, it was a Class C minor-league; the Philadelphia Athletics had an affiliate during this time. In 1954, the American League Athletics were based in Philadelphia and their Provincial League club in Drummondville, Quebec.

Beecher had been president of the Burlington Cardinals during the Northern League's final season and assumed the same position with the new club when the Provincial League Dummondville club became available in the fall of 1954.

The 1955 Burlington Athletics attracted 51,267 fans to Centennial Field for the season, the second highest attendance in the League. Burlington went 65–64 to finish in third-place, 20.5 games behind the first-place St. Jean Canadians. Burlington pitcher Jack Hale tied for the league-lead in wins with 17. In the playoffs, Burlington beat first-place St. Jean in the first round but lost the championship to the Quebec Braves, four games to one. Two of the 1955 Athletics, pitcher Bob Davis and outfielder Bill Kern would reach the major leagues.

The Provincial League was not financially sustainable and disbanded prior to the 1956 season.

==== Vermont Reds ====
Affiliated minor League baseball returned to Centennial Field in 1984 when Mike Agganis moved his AA Eastern League Lynn Pirates from Lynn, Massachusetts to Burlington. The club had been affiliated with the Pittsburgh Pirates and Agganis signed a four-year agreement with the Cincinnati Reds. The club was renamed the Vermont Reds.

The club finished in fourth-place in 1984 and 1985, and in second-place in 1986. The Reds excelled in the post-season and won the Eastern League championship each of these three years. Vermont finished fourth again in 1987 but lost in the League finals. Barry Larkin, Jeff Montgomery, Rob Dibble, Kal Daniels, Chris Sabo, and Norm Charlton all starred in Burlington and became the core of the 1990 World Champion Cincinnati Reds.

Larkin had the most distinguished career of all of the Vermont Reds alumni playing for Cincinnati from 1986 to 2004. A 12-time National League all-star and three-time Gold Glove Award winner, he was the 1995 National League Most Valuable Player and was inducted into the National Baseball Hall of Fame in 2012.

==== Vermont Mariners ====
After the 1987 season, Cincinnati signed a new affiliation agreement with the Chattanooga Lookouts. The Seattle Mariners had themselves been affiliated with Chattanooga and signed with Agganis and the Burlington franchise. The Vermont Reds became the Vermont Mariners.

The team finished second in the Eastern League behind the Glens Falls Tigers. Vermont made the playoffs but lost to the Albany-Colonie Yankees in the finals. Mariners manager Rich Morales was named Eastern League Manager of the Year and Jim Wilson and Omar Vizquel were Eastern League All-Stars.

Ken Griffey Jr. was selected by the Seattle Mariners with the first pick of the 1987 Major League Baseball draft. Griffey played for the Bellingham Mariners in 1987 and spent most of the 1988 season with the Class A California League San Bernardino Spirit. Griffey was promoted to Burlington and played at Centennial Field late in the 1988 season. He played in 17 games for the Mariners and hit two home runs. In 2016, Griffey was enshrined in the National Baseball Hall of Fame, joining Larkin.

Future major league star shortstop Omar Vizquel spent the bulk of the 1988 season with the Mariners hitting .254 with 30 stolen bases, before he was called up to Triple A in early August, prior to Griffey becoming active. Vizquel that year showed glimpses of his outstanding fielding that would earn him 11 Gold Gloves throughout his big league career, second-most among shortstops in major league history.

By September 1988, with the team in the Eastern League playoffs, Agganis had decided to move the franchise to Canton, Ohio. Canton was building a brand-new ballpark, Thurman Munson Memorial Stadium, which would have a capacity of 5,700. More so, the Canton metropolitan area offered twice the population of Burlington. Agganis told The New York Times, "Our attendance has averaged out to about 85,000 over five years in Burlington. In Canton, we can probably do between 225,000 and 300,000 attendance." The franchise moved to Canton after the 1988 season, affiliated with Cleveland, and became the Canton–Akron Indians.

==== Vermont Expos & Lake Monsters ====
Minor league baseball returned to Centennial Field in 1994. Burlington businessman Ray Pecor, owner of Lake Champlain Transportation Co. in Burlington since 1976, purchased the franchise rights of the Jamestown Expos and brought minor league baseball back to Burlington.

The Vermont Expos debuted at Centennial Field on June 16, 1994. They lost 6–5 to the Pittsfield Mets but more than 5,000 fans attended the game.

In the franchise's second season in Burlington, the Expos won the 1995 McNamara Division title and in 1996, it repeated as division champs and captured its only New York Penn League championship.

The Expos passed one million in cumulative attendance during the 2002 season. The team changed its name to the Lake Monsters in 2006, one year after the big league parent franchise Montreal Expos moved to Washington and became the Nationals. The 2005 Vermont Expos are the last professional team to be named the Expos.

In 2011, Vermont changed its major league affiliation from the Washington Nationals (National League) to the Oakland Athletics (American League). That season Vermont returned to the NYP postseason for the first time in 15 seasons by capturing the Stedler Division pennant on the final day of the regular season.

Since the franchise moved to Vermont in 1994, 68 former Expos/Lake Monsters have reached the major leagues (as of July 2015) including future standouts Addison Russell, Orlando Cabrera, Jamey Carroll, Milton Bradley, Jorge Julio, Jason Bay, Ian Desmond, Jordan Zimmermann, Tommy Milone, and Danny Espinosa.

After the cancelled 2020 minor league season, Major League Baseball took direct control of Minor League Baseball and discontinued short-season play. The Lake Monsters were not invited to remain in affiliated baseball. The team was in discussions to continue as a professional baseball team for 2021 but ended up joining the Futures Collegiate Baseball League.

=== Collegiate Summer Baseball ===
Pre-renovation scoreboard

The summer collegiate Northern League (baseball, 1934–1952) Burlington Cardinals played at Centennial Field from 1935 to 1941 and from 1946 to 1952. The league disbanded when it was not sanctioned by ECAC and NCAA member institutions due to its semi-professional status. Collegiate summer leagues since can include only amateur players.

Among the many future major leaguers who played for the Cardinals, Johnny Podres made his professional debut at Centennial Field in 1950 pitching for Cardinals. In 2005, the Vermont Expos invited Podres back to Centennial Field to throw out the first pitch in honor of the 50th anniversary of the 1955 Brooklyn Dodgers World Series championship.

The collegiate Northern League was revived in the late 1970s through the 1980s and Centennial Field was the home of the Burlington Expos, Burlington A's and the Queen City Royals. The first edition of the Burlington Expos collegiate team was led by current Clemson head baseball coach, Jack Leggett, a native of South Burlington who also was the coach of the UVM baseball team at the time. Future major league pitchers Kirk McCaskill and Mike Rochford hurled for the Expos during the summers.

The Lake Monsters joined the Futures Collegiate Baseball League for the 2021 season.

== Historic marker ==
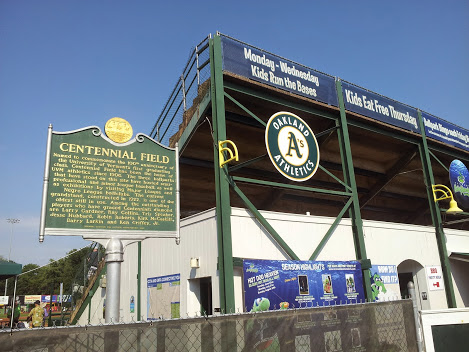
Centennial Field (June 2014)

The Vermont Division for Historic Preservation erected a marker at the ballpark in 1997. It reads,

Named to commemorate the 100th anniversary of the University of Vermont's first graduating class, Centennial Field has been the home of UVM athletics since 1906. The three ballparks that have stood on this site have hosted semi-professional and minor league baseball, as well as exhibitions by visiting Major League and Negro League ballclubs. The current grandstand, constructed in 1922, is one of the oldest still in use. Among the outstanding players who have graced Centennial's diamond are Larry Gardner, Ray Collins, Tris Speaker, Jesse Hubbard, Robin Roberts, Kirk McCaskill, Barry Larkin, and Ken Griffey, Jr.

== Photo gallery ==
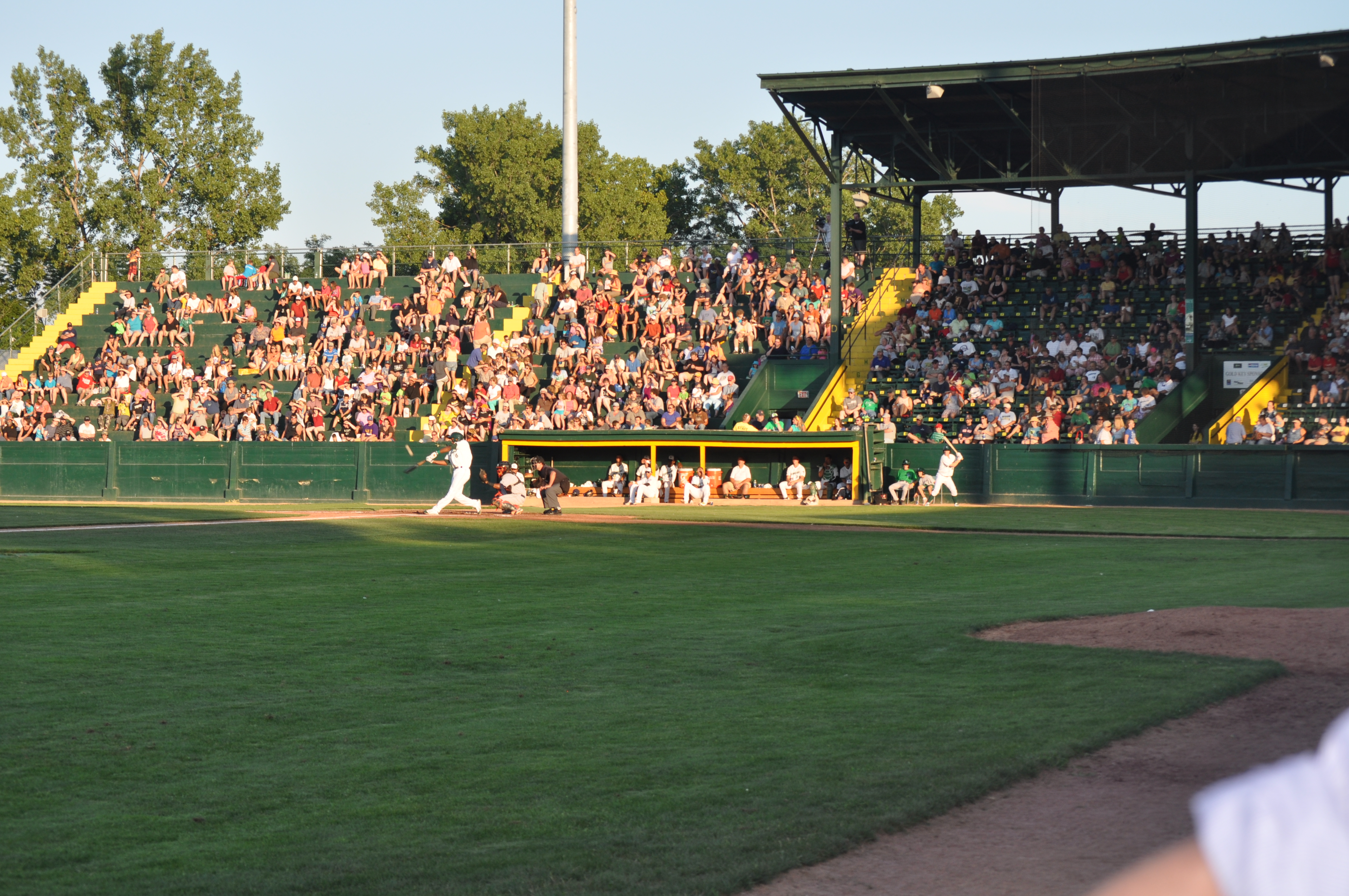

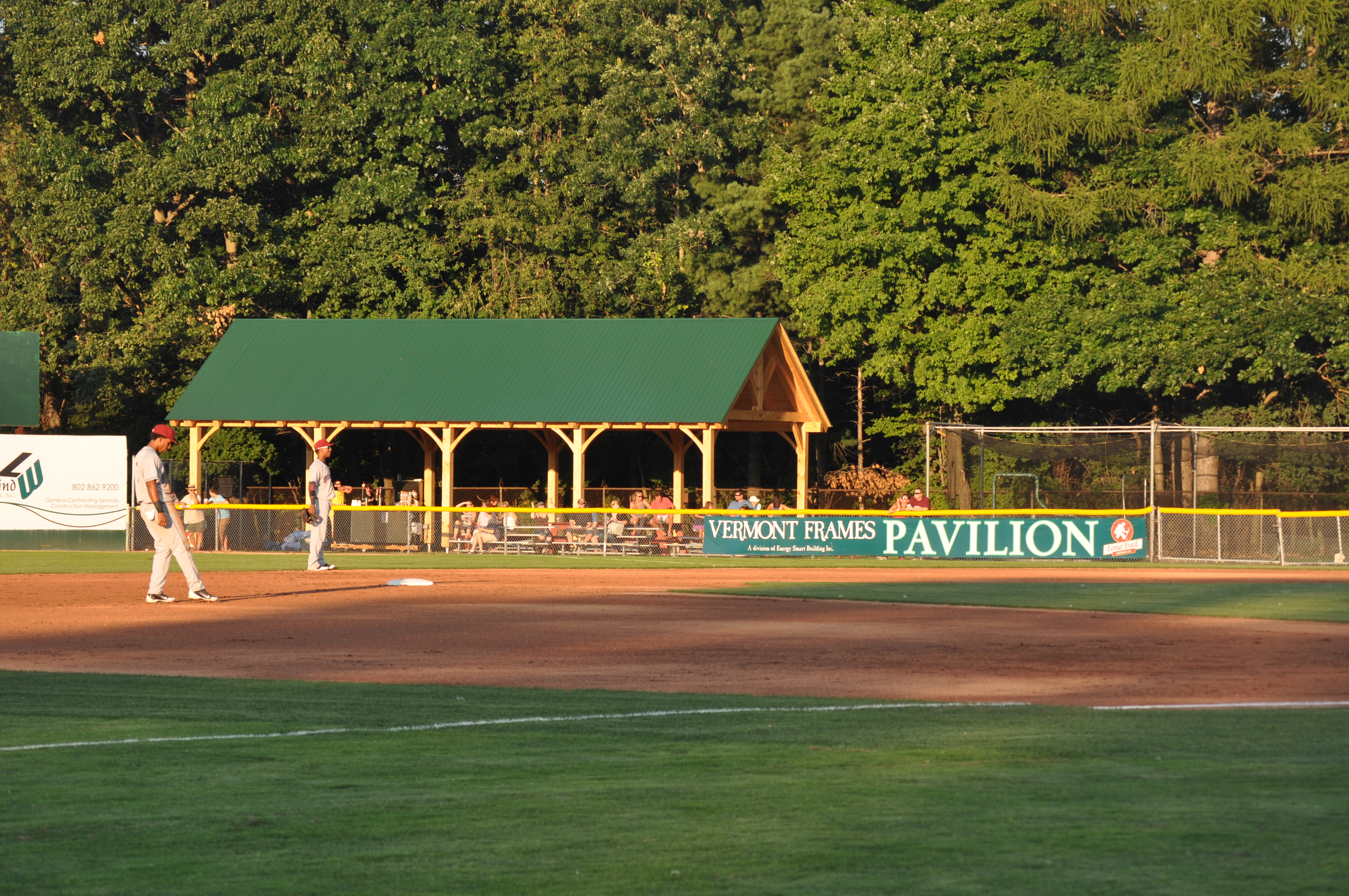

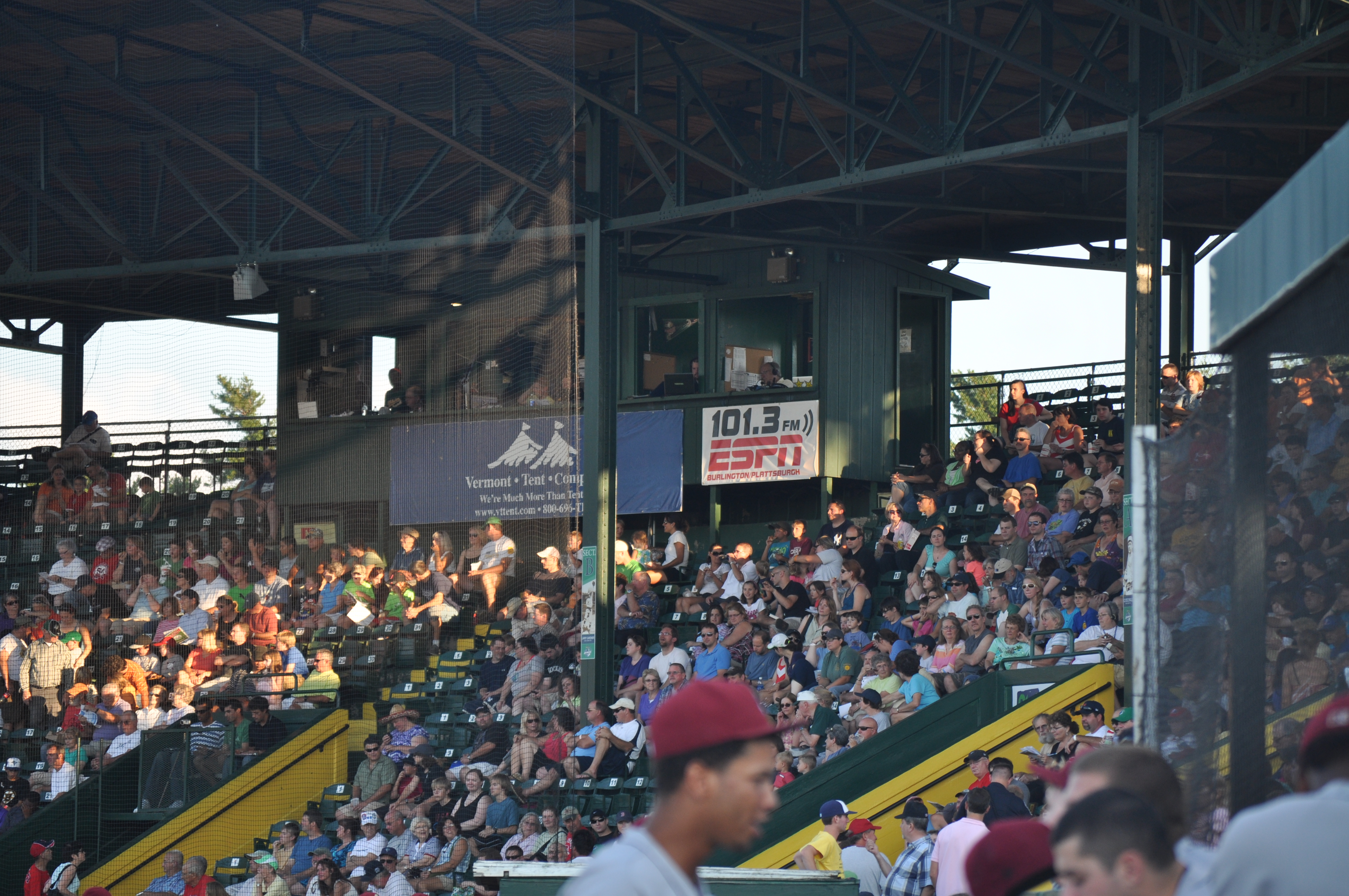
