= Roberto Rivera =

Roberto Rivera may refer to:

- Roberto Rivera (footballer) (born 1980), Mexican footballer
- Roberto Rivera (baseball) (born 1969), baseball player
- Roberto Rivera Ruiz (born 1950), Puerto Rican politician
- Roberto Maldonado Rivera, Puerto Rican nationalist
