= 1988 Eastern League season =

The 1988 Eastern League season began on approximately April 1 and the regular season ended on approximately September 1.

The Albany/Colonie Yankees defeated the Vermont Mariners three games to one to win the Eastern League Championship Series.

== Regular season ==
=== Standings ===
Eastern League
Team	Win	Loss	%	GB
Glens Falls Tigers	80	57	.584	–
**Vermont Mariners**	79	60	.568	2.0
Pittsfield Cubs	75	63	.543	5.5
**Albany/Colonie Yankees**	72	66	.522	8.5
Reading Phillies	67	69	.493	12.5
Williamsport Bills	66	73	.475	15.0
Harrisburg Senators	65	73	.471	15.5
New Britain Red Sox	47	90	.343	33.0

Notes:

Green shade indicates that team advanced to the playoffs
Bold indicates that team advanced to ELCS
Italics indicates that team won ELCS

== Playoffs ==
=== Semi-finals Series ===
Albany/Colonie Yankees defeated Glens Falls Tigers 3 games to 1.

Vermont Mariners defeated Pittsfield Cubs 3 games to 1.

=== Championship Series ===
Albany/Colonie Yankees defeated Vermont Mariners 3 games to 1.

== Attendance ==
1988 Eastern League	Regular season	Playoffs
**Total attendance**	944,590	11,544
**Total games played**	551	12
**Average attendance per game**	1,714	962
