= 1996 Eastern League season =

The 1996 Eastern League season began on approximately April 1 and the regular season ended on approximately September 1.

The Harrisburg Senators defeated the Portland Sea Dogs 3 games to 1 to win the Eastern League Championship Series.

== Regular season ==
=== Standings ===
Eastern League – Northern Division
Team	Win	Loss	%	GB
**Portland Sea Dogs**	83	58	.589	–
Binghamton Mets	76	66	.535	7.5
Norwich Navigators	71	70	.504	12.0
New Haven Ravens	66	75	.468	17.0
New Britain Rock Cats	61	81	.430	22.5

Eastern League – Southern Division
Team	Win	Loss	%	GB
Trenton Thunder	86	56	.606	–
**Harrisburg Senators**	74	68	.521	12.0
Canton–Akron Indians	71	71	.500	15.0
Reading Phillies	66	75	.468	19.5
Bowie Baysox	54	88	.380	32.0

Notes:

Green shade indicates that team advanced to the playoffs
Bold indicates that team advanced to ELCS
Italics indicates that team won ELCS

== Playoffs ==
=== Divisional Series ===
==== Northern Division ====
The Portland Sea Dogs defeated the Binghamton Mets in the Northern Division playoffs 3 games to 2.

==== Southern Division ====
The Harrisburg Senators defeated the Trenton Thunder in the Southern Division playoffs 3 games to 1.

=== Championship series ===
The Harrisburg Senators defeated the Portland Sea Dogs in the ELCS 3 games to 1.
