= 1993 Eastern League season =

The 1993 Eastern League baseball season began on approximately April 1 and the regular season ended on approximately September 1.

The Harrisburg Senators defeated the Canton–Akron Indians 3 games to 2 to win the Eastern League Championship Series.

== Regular season ==
=== Standings ===
Eastern League
Team	Win	Loss	%	GB
**Harrisburg Senators**	94	44	.681	–
**Canton–Akron Indians**	75	63	.543	19.0
Bowie Baysox	72	68	.514	23.0
Albany-Colonie Yankees	70	68	.507	24.0
Binghamton Mets	68	72	.486	27.0
London Tigers	63	75	.457	31.0
Reading Phillies	62	78	.443	33.0
New Britain Red Sox	52	88	.371	43.0

Note: Green shade indicates that team advanced to the playoffs; Bold indicates that team advanced to ELCS; Italics indicates that team won ELCS

== Playoffs ==
=== Semi-finals Series ===
- The Canton–Akron Indians defeated the Bowie Baysox 3 games to 2.
- The Harrisburg Senators defeated the Albany-Colonie Yankees 3 games to 1.

=== Championship Series ===
- The Harrisburg Senators defeated the Canton–Akron Indians in the ELCS 3 games to 2.
