= 1992 Eastern League season =

The 1992 Eastern League season began on approximately April 1 and the regular season ended on approximately September 1.

The Binghamton Mets defeated the Canton–Akron Indians 3 games to 2 to win the Eastern League Championship Series.

== Regular season ==
=== Standings ===
Eastern League
Team	Win	Loss	%	GB
**Canton–Akron Indians**	80	58	.580	–
**Binghamton Mets**	79	59	.572	1.0
Harrisburg Senators	78	59	.569	1.5
Albany-Colonie Yankees	71	68	.511	9.5
London Tigers	67	70	.489	12.5
Reading Phillies	61	77	.442	19.0
Hagerstown Suns	59	80	.424	21.5
New Britain Red Sox	58	82	.414	23.0

Note: Green shade indicates that team advanced to the playoffs; Bold indicates that team advanced to ELCS; Italics indicates that team won ELCS

== Playoffs ==
=== Semi-finals Series ===
- The Binghamton Mets defeated the Harrisburg Senators 3 games to 1.
- The Canton–Akron Indians defeated the Albany-Colonie Yankees 3 games to 1.

=== Championship Series ===
The Binghamton Mets defeated the Canton–Akron Indians in the ELCS 3 games to 2.

Game	Date	Matchup	Winner	Score	Win	Loss	Save	Attendance
1	–	BIN @ CAK	BIN (1-0)	6 – 5(11)	Wegmann	Gardella		–
2	–	BIN @ CAK	CAK (1-1)	2 – 1	Ogea	Martinez		–
3	–	CAK @ BIN	CAK (2-1)	6 – 3	Garcia	Johnstone	Gardella	–
4	–	CAK @ BIN	BIN (2-2)	7 – 2	Vitko	Embree		–
5	–	CAK @ BIN	BIN (3-2)	5 – 2	Jones	Ogea		-
