= Quigley Stadium =

Quigley Stadium may refer to:

- Quigley Stadium (Little Rock), a high school football stadium in Little Rock, Arkansas
- Quigley Stadium (West Haven), a baseball stadium in West Haven, Connecticut
