= Canton–Akron Indians =

- 1989–1996; Canton, Ohio

Minor league affiliations
- Previous classes: Double-A
- League: Eastern League

Major league affiliations
- Previous teams: Cleveland Indians 1989–1996

Minor league titles
- Class titles: 0
- League titles: 0
- Conference titles: 0
- Division titles (1): 1992

Team data
- Previous names: Akron RubberDucks (2014–present); Akron Aeros (1997–2013); Canton–Akron Indians (1989–1996); Vermont Mariners (1988); Vermont Reds (1984–1987); Lynn Sailors (1980–1983)
- Previous parks: Thurman Munson Memorial Stadium

The Canton–Akron Indians are a defunct Minor League Baseball team. They played in the Eastern League at Thurman Munson Memorial Stadium in Canton, Ohio from 1989 to 1996. They were affiliated with the Cleveland Indians.

== History ==
Prior to their eight-year stint as the Canton–Akron Indians, this franchise was known as the Lynn Sailors (from 1980 to 1983 serving as the Double-A affiliate of the Seattle Mariners and Pittsburgh Pirates), Vermont Reds (from 1984 to 1987 serving as the Double-A affiliate of the Cincinnati Reds), and Vermont Mariners (in 1988 serving as the Double-A affiliate of the Seattle Mariners).

After the stint as the Canton–Akron Indians, the franchise moved to nearby Akron, Ohio and became the Akron Aeros.

== Notable players ==
=== 1989 ===
- Beau Allred
- Kevin Bearse
- Albert Belle
- Jim Bruske
- Tom Kramer
- Mark Lewis
- Ever Magallanes
- Tom Magrann
- Greg McMichael
- Charles Nagy
- Troy Neel
- Jeff Shaw
- Cory Snyder
- Tim Stoddard
- Rick Surhoff
- Dwight Taylor
- Efraín Valdez
- Turner Ward

=== 1990 ===
- Albert Belle
- Jim Bruske
- Jerry Dipoto
- Bruce Egloff
- John Farrell
- Jeff Fassero
- Ed Hearn
- Don Heinkel
- Tom Kramer
- Mark Lewis
- Greg McMichael
- Francisco Meléndez
- Jeff Mutis
- Charles Nagy
- Ken Ramos
- Rudy Seánez
- Jim Tatum
- Mike C. Walker
- Robbie Wine

=== 1991 ===
- Eric Bell
- Mike Birkbeck
- Jim Bruske
- Craig Chamberlain
- Tim Costo
- Jerry Dipoto
- Logan Easley
- José Elías Escobar
- Rick Horton
- Reggie Jefferson
- Garland Kiser
- Tom Kramer
- Jesse Levis
- Carlos Martínez
- Brian Meyer
- Oscar Múñoz
- Jeff Mutis
- Ken Ramos
- Rudy Seánez
- Andrés Thomas
- Jim Thome
- Lee Tinsley
- Mike C. Walker
- Colby Ward
- Kevin Wickander

=== 1992 ===
- Paul Byrd
- George Canale
- Alan Embree
- Brett Gideon
- Brian Giles
- José Hernández
- Glenallen Hill
- Garland Kiser
- Luis Lopez
- Dave Mlicki
- Donell Nixon
- Chad Ogea
- Dave Otto
- Eric Plunk
- Ken Ramos
- Joel Skinner
- Kelly Stinnett
- Jim Thome
- Lee Tinsley
- Bill Wertz

=== 1993 ===
- Paul Abbott
- Gerald Alexander
- David Bell
- Paul Byrd
- Mike Dyer
- Alan Embree
- Brian Giles
- José Hernández
- Calvin Jones
- Pat Lennon
- Albie Lopez
- Luis Lopez
- Greg McCarthy
- Dave Mlicki
- Charles Nagy
- Julio Peguero
- Herbert Perry
- Ted Power
- Manny Ramirez
- Roberto Rivera
- Paul Shuey
- Joel Skinner
- Julián Tavárez
- Rafael Valdez
- Randy Veres

=== 1994 ===
- Paul Byrd
- Carlos Crawford
- Alan Embree
- Pep Harris
- Damian Jackson
- Greg McCarthy
- Gino Minutelli
- Matt Williams

=== 1995 ===
- Sandy Alomar Jr.
- José Cabrera
- Darrin Chapin
- Carlos Crawford
- Roland de la Maza
- Travis Driskill
- Danny Graves
- Pep Harris
- Damian Jackson
- Steve Kline
- Mike Matthews
- Alex Ramírez
- Anthony Telford
- Ricky Trlicek
- Don Wakamatsu
- Eric Yelding

=== 1996 ===
- Bruce Aven
- José Cabrera
- Bartolo Colón
- Roland de la Maza
- Einar Díaz
- Travis Driskill
- Steve Kline
- Mike Matthews
- Erik Plantenberg
- Alex Ramírez
- Richie Sexson
- Kevin Tolar
- Enrique Wilson

== See also ==
- List of defunct Ohio sports teams
