= Vermont Mariners =

- (1988); Burlington, Vermont
Team logo
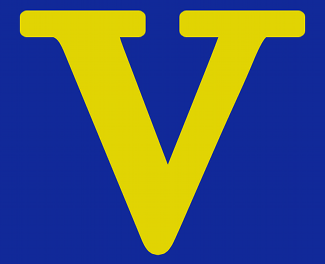
Cap insignia

Minor league affiliations
- Previous classes: Double-A
- League: Eastern League

Major league affiliations
- Previous teams: Seattle Mariners

Team data
- Colors: Royal blue, gold, white
- Previous parks: Centennial Field

The Vermont Mariners are a defunct minor league baseball team. They played in the Eastern League at Centennial Field in Burlington, Vermont in 1988. They were affiliated with the Seattle Mariners.

== History ==
Prior to their four-year stint as the Vermont Mariners, this franchise was known as the Vermont Reds from 1984 to 1987 and served as the Double-A affiliate of the Cincinnati Reds. Prior to that, the franchise was known as the Lynn Sailors from 1980 to 1983 and served as the Double-A affiliate of the Seattle Mariners (1980 to 1982) and Pittsburgh Pirates (1983).

By September 1988, with the team in the Eastern League playoffs, team owner Mike Agganis had decided to move the franchise to Canton, Ohio. Canton was building a brand-new ballpark, Thurman Munson Memorial Stadium, which would have a capacity of 5,700. More so, the Canton metropolitan area offered twice the population of Burlington. Agganis told the New York Times, "Our attendance has averaged out to about 85,000 over five years in Burlington. In Canton, we can probably do between 225,000 and 300,000 attendance." The franchise moved to Canton after the 1988 season, affiliated with Cleveland, and became the Canton–Akron Indians.

== Season-by-season record ==
| Season | Division | Finish | Wins | Losses | Win% | GB | Postseason | Manager | Attendance |
|---|---|---|---|---|---|---|---|---|---|
Vermont Mariners
| 1988 | No divisions | 2nd | 79 | 60 | .568 | 2 | Defeated Pittsfield in semi-final series 3-1; Lost to Albany-Colonie in championship series 1-3 | Rich Morales | 68,894 |

== Notable players ==
- Chuck Carr
- Eric Fox
- Jerry Goff
- Ken Griffey Jr.
- Calvin Jones
- Pat Lennon
- Omar Vizquel
- Jim Wilson
- Clint Zavaras
