= Ken Ramos =

American baseball player (1967-2016)

- Outfielder
- Born: June 6, 1967; Sidney, Nebraska, U.S.
- Died: May 15, 2016 (aged 48); Pueblo, Colorado, U.S.
- Batted: Left Threw: Left

MLB debut
- May 6, 1997, for the Houston Astros

Last MLB appearance
- June 11, 1997, for the Houston Astros

MLB statistics
- Batting average: .000
- On-base percentage: .133
- Runs batted in: 1
- Stats at Baseball Reference

Teams
- Houston Astros (1997)

Kenneth Cecil Ramos (June 6, 1967 – May 15, 2016) was an American outfielder in Major League Baseball who played for the Houston Astros in its 1997 season. Listed at 6 foot 1 inch, 185 pounds, he batted and threw left handed.

Ken Ramos is remembered as an outfielder that reached the majors briefly in 1997 with the Astros, even though he was more renowned for his lengthy and productive minor league career.

Born in Sidney, Nebraska, Ramos attended the University of Nebraska–Lincoln. He was originally selected by the Chicago Cubs in the sixth round of the 1986 MLB draft out of Otero Junior College in La Junta, Colorado, but he opted not to sign. He then signed as a free agent with the Cleveland Indians in 1989, and was traded to the Chicago White Sox in exchange for Matt Merullo in the spring of 1994. Finally, a few days later, he was selected off waivers by Houston from the White Sox.

Ramos appeared in 14 games for the Astros, primarily as a pinch hitter, and was hitless in 14 at-bats while compiling one run batted in and two walks. Nevertheless, his Minor League career spanned ten seasons, from 1989 until 1998, including six at Triple-A with stints in the farm systems of the Indians, Astros and Minnesota Twins.

While with the Kinston Indians, Ramos earned a spot on the 1990 Carolina League All-Star squad. His most productive season in the minors came in 1992, when he hit a slash line of .339/.342/.448 with Double-A Canton-Akron Indians and earned Lou Boudreau Award honors as Indians' Minor League Player of the Year.

Ramos retired in 1998, at age 31, after dividing his playing time at Triple-A with the New Orleans Zephyrs and Salt Lake Buzz.

Overall, Ramos hit .300 (1036-for-3449) with 24 home runs and 328 RBI in 1,039 minor league games, including 599 runs, 157 doubles, 49 triples and 120 stolen bases. Besides, he posted averages of .300 or better in five seasons, with a career-best .345 in 1990. In total, he walked more than he struck out, amassing 503 walks against 311 strikeouts, to collect on-base percentages of .400 or more five times.

In between, Ramos played winter ball with the Águilas del Zulia and Navegantes del Magallanes clubs of the Venezuelan League in part of two seasons spanning 1993–1995.

On May 15, 2016, Ramos shot and killed his wife Lisa Ramos and then committed suicide at the couple's home in Pueblo, Colorado. He left behind one daughter, Delaney.

== Sources ==
Awards and achievements
Preceded by Manny Ramirez	Indians' Minor League Player of the Year (the Lou Boudreau Award); 1992	Succeeded by Jim Thome
