= Bob Didier =

American baseball player (born 1949)

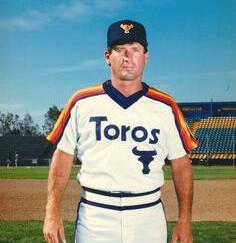
- Didier as manager of the Tucson Toros in 1987
- Catcher
- Born: February 16, 1949 (age 77); Hattiesburg, Mississippi, U.S.
- Batted: Switch Threw: Right

MLB debut
- April 7, 1969, for the Atlanta Braves

Last MLB appearance
- April 23, 1974, for the Boston Red Sox

MLB statistics
- Batting average: .229
- Home runs: 0
- Runs batted in: 59
- Stats at Baseball Reference

Teams
- As player: Atlanta Braves (1969–1972); Detroit Tigers (1973); Boston Red Sox (1974); As coach: Oakland Athletics (1984–1986); Seattle Mariners (1989–1990)

Robert Daniel Didier (born February 16, 1949) is an American former catcher in Major League Baseball (MLB) who played for three different teams from 1969 through 1974. Listed at 6 feet (1.8 m), 190 pounds (86 kg), he was a switch-hitter who threw right-handed. His ability to handle knuckleball pitchers Phil Niekro and Hoyt Wilhelm made him a key part of the 1969 Atlanta Braves first place finish in the National League West division. Didier managed for 16 seasons in Minor League Baseball (MiLB), and was an MLB coach for the Oakland Athletics and Seattle Mariners, as well as an advance scout for the New York Yankees.

== Early life ==
Didier was born on February 16, 1949, in Hattiesburg, Mississippi. His great-grandfather, Odell Didier, had emigrated from France after World War I, and opened a general store in Marksville, Louisiana. Didier's grandfather, Robert Didier, was a semipro baseball player at catcher, and played one season (1940) for the Class C Greenville Buckshots. During his semipro days, Robert Didier played with and against Hall of Fame outfielder Mel Ott, and he and his wife decided to name their son Melvin, Didier's father, after Ott. Mel Didier went on to become a renowned MLB scout and player development executive for decades, who was associated with professional baseball for over 60 years before his death in 2017.

Before his full-time association with professional baseball, Mel Didier had played football and baseball at Louisiana State University (LSU), and was an assistant football coach at LSU. He was signed to pitch in the Detroit Tigers minor league system by John McHale, who later hired him to scout for the Braves. When Didier was only three years old, Mel Didier bought him a catcher's mitt, thinking that catching was the best route for his son to someday become a Major League player. It was McHale who years later had the Braves scout and pursue Didier as a player when Didier was in high school, though at the time Mel Didier refused to be the scout providing a report on his own son.

Didier attended Glen Oaks High School, in Baton Rouge, Louisiana. Didier played baseball, football (quarterback) and basketball in high school. His father coached Glen Oaks' baseball and football teams during Didier's first two years there. Didier played catcher on the school's baseball team. He was twice named an All-State catcher in baseball, and was All-District in basketball. He also played American Legion Baseball at catcher. As a quarterback, he led the team to a state championship. His high school nickname was "HiYa". He was inducted into the inaugural class of the Glen Oaks High School Hall of Fame on May 7, 1970.

== Playing career ==
=== Atlanta Braves ===
The Atlanta Braves drafted Didier in the fourth round of the June 1967 MLB amateur draft, 72nd overall. In 1967, he played 33 games for the Single-A Kinston Eagles of the Carolina League, and 18 games for the West Palm Beach Braves of the Florida State League. He hit under .200 for both teams, with a .980 fielding percentage at Kinston and .977 at West Palm Beach as a catcher. In 1968, he played in 82 games for the Single-A Greenwood Braves, raising his batting average to .243 and fielding percentage to .984. This fielding percentage led all Western Carolina League catchers.

Didier's rookie season in Major League Baseball came in 1969 with the Braves, at only 20-years old. The team expected that he would continue to develop in its minor league system, but after trading five-time All-Star catcher Joe Torre before the season, Didier won the Braves' catching job. Just a few years earlier, Torre had been Didier's childhood hero. Other Braves catchers on the roster had a variety of issues that precluded them from replacing Torre. Braves vice president Paul Richards and manager Luman Harris believed Didier would do well defensively, but did not expect him to hit above .200.

The 1969 Braves had two future Hall of Fame pitchers who achieved success with the knuckleball as their principal pitch, starter Phil Niekro and relief pitcher Hoyt Wilhelm (who joined the team later in the season during the pennant drive). The 46-year old Wilhelm was two years older than Mel Didier at the time. They are considered among the top few knuckleball pitchers in MLB history, with Niekro and/or Wilhelm often considered the best.

Didier won the catching job in 1969 because he was able to catch Niekro's knuckleball. The knuckleball is notoriously difficult on catchers, but Didier handled the pitch well, even though he had never caught a knuckleball pitcher before the 1969 season. He was Niekro's preferred catcher. Niekro was 23–13 that season with a 2.56 earned run average (ERA), and was second in voting for the Cy Young Award. Wilhelm was 2–0 with four saves and a 0.73 earned run average in 12.1 innings pitched over eight games between September 11 and October 2.

Between catching Niekro and Wilhelm for nearly 300 innings in 1969, however, Didier still led the NL is passed balls (27), with 12 more than the next highest catcher. In just one game that season, Niekro had three wild pitches and Didier had four passed balls in only five innings. Didier's focus in catching Niekro and Wilhelm, was not be intimidated by the knuckleball or afraid of the potential for passed balls, which everyone recognized were to be expected with the knuckleball; and to use his whole body along with his glove hand to block the ball from getting by him.

In his rookie season, Didier appeared in a career-high 114 games, starting 108, and helping his team win the National League West Division title. The Braves lost the first National League Championship Series to the New York Mets. After the season, manager Lum Harris said of Didier "It's hard to figure how much credit he deserves for our success . . . You can't find words to put him high enough. He was out of this world".

The switch-hitting Didier had a .254 batting average, and .994 fielding percentage. His fielding percentage was second best in the National League to Johnny Edwards (who also had a .994 fielding percentage). He finished fourth in the Rookie of the Year vote (behind Ted Sizemore, Coco Laboy and Al Oliver and above Larry Hisle) and also was named to the 1969 MLB Topps All-Star Rookie Roster.

In 1970, Didier played sporadically for the Giants due to his lack of hitting (.149 with no home runs). He only started 48 games, and was often used as a late inning replacement to catch Niekro and Wilhelm. He was eventually sent to the Triple-A Richmond Braves, where he hit .309 in 46 games. Didier started the 1971 season in Atlanta, but was sent down to Richmond in early August. At the time, he had played in 49 games for the Braves, and was batting .219. He hit .283 in 25 games with Richmond, and played two more games for Atlanta after returning to the team in September.

He played the majority of the 1972 season in Richmond, hitting .259 in 106 games. Didier had a .997 fielding percentage with only two errors on the season. One of his teammates was future Hall of Fame manager Tony La Russa. He only played in 13 games for Atlanta that season. He was assigned to Richmond to begin the 1973 season, and made known to Braves management that he wanted to be traded.

=== Detroit Tigers, Boston Red Sox, Houston Astros ===
Johnny Lipton, manager of the Detroit Tigers' Triple-A affiliate Toledo Mud Hens was interested in obtaining Didier. On May 14, 1973, Didier was traded to the Detroit Tigers for Gene Lamont, and assigned to the Mud Hens. He came up to the Tigers in September, hitting .455 in seven games. The Tigers sold Didier's contract rights to the Boston Red Sox on March 28, 1974. He played in five games for the Red Sox in April, his last Major League games. The Red Sox assigned Didier to the Triple-A Pawtucket Red Sox, where he hit .225 in 78 games with a .994 fielding percentage.

The Red Sox traded Didier to the Houston Astros in December 1974 for Roe Skidmore, but Didier never played for the Astros. He spent the season with the Triple-A Iowa Oaks, the Astros’ affiliate in the American Association. 1976 was his final year as a professional player, playing in 47 games for the Richmond Braves.

=== Career ===
After the 1969 season, he suffered arm and back problems and played only in 133 games over the next five seasons in MLB. In a six-season career, he was a .229 hitter (172-for-751) with 32 RBI and 32 runs without any home runs. As a catcher, he collected 1276 outs, 119 assists, and committed only nine errors in 1404 chances, for a .994 fielding percentage.

== Managing and coaching career ==
=== Minor league manager ===
After retiring in 1976, Didier went on to a long career managing and coaching. In 1977, the Braves hired him to manage their rookie league team, the Kingsport Braves, where he had an 43–26 record. In 1978, he managed the short season Single-A Bellingham Mariners in the Seattle Mariners' farm system, going 41–30. In 1979, he managed the Class A San Jose Missions, the Mariners' affiliate in the California League. He led the Missions to a 89–51 record, finishing in first place in the South Division, and winning the league championship.

In 1980, he managed the Triple-A Vancouver Canadians, the Milwaukee Brewers' affiliate in the Pacific Coast League; finishing in first place in the North Division with a 79–60 record. He managed in the Oakland Athletics' farm system from 1981 to 1983, two years with the Double-A West Haven A's, and one year with the Triple-A Tacoma Tigers. The 1982 West Haven A's had an 86–54 record and were Eastern League playoff champions.

In 1987 and 1988, he managed the Triple-A Tucson Toros, a Houston Astros' affiliate. From 1993 to 1995, he managed the Syracuse Chiefs, the Toronto Blue Jays' affiliate in the Triple-A International League. In 2002, he managed the Brevard County Manatees, a Montreal Expos' affiliate in the advanced Single-A Florida State League. His last three years managing in the minor leagues were with the Yakima Bears from 2008 to 2010, the Arizona Diamondbacks' affiliate in the short season Single-A Northwest League.

In 16 seasons managing minor league baseball, he had a 920–900 record.

In 1991, 1992 and 2000 he was the Toronto Blue Jays' minor league catching coordinator. In 2006 and 2007 he was the minor league catching coordinator for the Arizona Diamondbacks. He was a minor league hitting coach for the independent Brockton Rox (2011) and Washington Wild Things in 2014.

=== Major league coach and scout ===
He was a Major League bench coach (1984, 1986) and first base coach (1985) for the Oakland Athletics. He was the Seattle Mariners' third base coach in 1989 and 1990. From 1997 to 1999, and 2001, he was an advance scout for the New York Yankees. The Yankees went to the World Series in 1998 and 1999, sweeping both series; and lost the 2001 World Series in seven games.

In 2007, Didier was part of the coaching staff at Major League Baseball's Academy in Tirrenia, Italy.
