= Mike Walker (pitcher, born 1966) =

American baseball player

- Pitcher
- Born: October 4, 1966 (age 59); Chicago, Illinois, U.S.
- Batted: Right Threw: Right

MLB debut
- September 9, 1988, for the Cleveland Indians

Last MLB appearance
- July 11, 1996, for the Detroit Tigers

MLB statistics
- Win–loss record: 3–11
- Earned run average: 5.09
- Strikeouts: 76
- Stats at Baseball Reference

Teams
- Cleveland Indians (1988, 1990–1991); Chicago Cubs (1995); Detroit Tigers (1996)

Michael Charles Walker (born October 4, 1966) is an American former professional baseball player. Walker played in Major League Baseball with the Cleveland Indians (1988, 1990, 1991), Chicago Cubs (1995), and Detroit Tigers (1996). Walker last played professional baseball in 1999 with the minor league Buffalo Bisons.

== Career ==
=== Early life and amateur career ===
Walker was born to Joan Robinett in Chicago and raised there. He was a fan of the Chicago Cubs and Chicago Bulls as a child. Walker graduated from Hernando High School in Brooksville, Florida, in 1984 and played college baseball at Seminole State College of Florida. He was drafted by the Cleveland Indians in 1986.

=== Professional career ===
He was assigned to the Burlington Indians to begin his professional career. In 1988, the Indians called Walker up to pitch in the exhibition Baseball Hall of Fame Game. At the time, he was described in The Morning Call as "the Eastern League's top pitcher." He made his regular season debut on September 9 of that year. He pitched 2.1 scoreless innings in relief of Rich Yett at Fenway Park against the Boston Red Sox. He made two more appearances in the Major Leagues that year and spent the entirety of the following season in Triple-A Colorado Springs despite remaining on the 40-man roster. Walker was assigned to Triple-A to start the 1990 season. After struggling early in the season, Walker was demoted to Double-A Canton-Akron. He made only one appearance for Canton-Akron before being promoted directly to the Major Leagues following the demotion of Charles Nagy. In 1991, the Indians converted Walker to a full-time relief pitcher and assigned him to Double-A to start the season. Walker, who by that point was pessimistic about his career prospects, was added to the big league roster in June. He would appear in five games for the Indians that year and allow only one earned run.

The Indians released Walker following the 1991 season. In December, he signed a minor league contract with the Detroit Tigers. After Walker failed to make the team out of spring training, the Tigers assigned him to Triple-A Toledo to start the season but released him in the middle of the 1992 season. He stayed in shape after his release be working out with his former high school team. The Indians re-signed him before the 1993 season but released him before spring training concluded. He then landed with the Chicago Cubs who assigned him to their Double-A affiliate. Following the season, Walker told the Cubs that he was considering retirement. Nonetheless, he returned for 1995 and the Cubs assigned him to Triple-A to begin the following season. Walker had improved his control by studying his pitching mechanics on video during the offseason and cut his walks in half. Walker made his debut with the Cubs on April 27, 1995. Walker described pitching for the Cubs as a dream come true, telling the Tampa Bay Times "I always wanted to be with the Cubs. One of my dreams was to be in the big leagues, and the other was to pitch with the Cubs." After retirement, he described pitching at Wrigley Field as the high point of his career. To his surprise, Walker was demoted to the minor leagues in late July despite leading the bullpen in earned run average and innings pitched. He was recalled to the bigs when rosters expanded in September and finished the season there.

During the 1995–96 offseason, Walker worked out with Mike Marshall, a former Cy Young Award winner who also had a doctorate in kinesiology. Shortly before the start of spring training, he signed a minor league contract with the Philadelphia Phillies but was released before the start of the season. On April 26, he signed with the Detroit Tigers and began the season at Triple-A Toledo. He was called up to the majors on May 24 along with Bob Scanlan and Raúl Casanova. The Tigers had the worst record in Major League Baseball at the time. He appeared in twenty games in relief for the Tigers that season and was demoted to the minors for the final time on July 13, 1996.

Walker pitched a strong enough season in 1997 with the Indianapolis Indians, Triple-A affiliate of the Cincinnati Reds, that the Reds brought him back for the 1998 season on a minor league contract. In 1998, while still pitching in Indianapolis, Walker broke a 43-year-old record by appearing in 78 games as a pitcher. His success in Indianapolis inspired him not to retire following the 1998 season.

Prior to the 1999 season, the Cleveland Indians signed Walker to a free agent contract and invited him to spring training. In July 1999, he was playing in Cleveland's farm system for the Buffalo Bisons when he was released and opted to retire from professional baseball.

== Personal life ==
In 1988, while playing for the Williamsport Bills, Walker met his future wife. They were married in or about January 1990. In June 1995, she had a 14-year-old daughter and they had two sons together, ages three and two. In 1997, he and his wife bought a sporting goods store off Florida State Road 50 in Brooksville.

Walker was working as the Director of Parks and Recreation for Brooksville in 2016. He was replaced in that role in 2019.
