= Roland de la Maza =

American baseball player (born 1971)

- Pitcher
- Born: November 11, 1971 (age 53); Granada Hills, California, U.S.
- Batted: Right Threw: Right

MLB debut
- September 26, 1997, for the Kansas City Royals

Last MLB appearance
- September 26, 1997, for the Kansas City Royals

MLB statistics
- Win–loss record: 0–0
- Earned run average: 4.50
- Strikeouts: 1
- Stats at Baseball Reference

Teams
- Kansas City Royals (1997)

Roland Robert de la Maza (born November 11, 1971) is an American former professional baseball pitcher who played one game in Major League Baseball (MLB) for the Kansas City Royals in 1997.

== Career ==
=== Amateur ===
His father, Rolando, was a Cuban immigrant. He attended St. Genevieve High School in California and later played college baseball at Sacramento State.

=== Professional ===
He was drafted by the Cleveland Indians in the 15th round, with the 419th overall selection, of the 1993 Major League Baseball draft. On August 30, 1997, de la Maza was traded by the Indians to the Kansas City Royals in exchange for Bip Roberts.

The only game de la Maza played was on September 26, 1997. He was substituted into the game for Kevin Appier in the sixth inning and allowed a home run to the first batter he faced, Ray Durham. He struck out the next batter, Mike Cameron, and retired five of the following six batters.
