= Fraser Field =

Baseball park in Lynn, Massachusetts, US

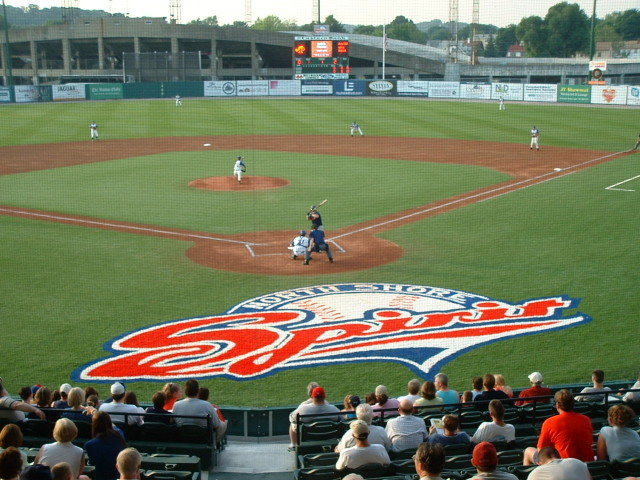
- Interactive map of Fraser Field
- Location: 365 Western Ave; Lynn, MA 01904
- Coordinates: 42°28′25.24″N 70°57′12.35″W
- Owner: City of Lynn, MA
- Capacity: 3,804
- Surface: FieldTurf artificial turf
- Field size: Left Field: 330 ft Center Field: 400 ft Right Field: 335 ft

Construction
- Groundbreaking: 1940
- Opened: June 18, 1940
- Renovated: 2003
- Cost: $210,000

Tenants
- North Shore Navigators (NECBL) (2008–present); North Shore Spirit (Can-Am League) (2003–2007); Massachusetts Mad Dogs (NEL) (1995–1999); Lynn Pirates (EL) (1983); Lynn Sailors (EL) (1980–1982); Lynn Tigers (NEL) (1949); Lynn Red Sox (NEL) (1946–1948)

Fraser Field is a baseball park in Lynn, Massachusetts that has played host to many minor-league baseball teams over the years.

The North Shore Navigators of the New England Collegiate Baseball League play at Fraser Field. In the spring, Fraser Field hosts the Falcons of Fisher College.

== History ==
Fraser Field was built in 1940. Like Holman Stadium in Nashua, New Hampshire, Fraser was a project of the Works Progress Administration during the New Deal. The Lynn Sailors, an affiliate of the Seattle Mariners, played at Fraser from 1980 through 1982, changing its name to the Lynn Pirates when its affiliation changed to the Pittsburgh Pirates. Attendance was low and got lower.

Fraser Field hosted only scholastic and city leagues until Jonathan Fleisig brought the Massachusetts Mad Dogs of the independent North Atlantic and Northeast leagues to Fraser Field from 1995 until 1999. By 1999, the concrete of the cantilevered roof had deteriorated so badly that the central seating section had to be roped off. The Mad Dogs announced a one-year hiatus from baseball and reopened in 2002 in Pittsfield, Massachusetts as the Berkshire Black Bears.

The North Shore Spirit of the independent Can-Am League played at Fraser Field from 2003 to 2007. In 2003, Nicholas Lopardo invested about $2.5 million to revitalize the park. Lopardo's renovations included new scoreboards, seating, concessions, and clubhouses. The roof was repaired but cut back in size. When the Spirit folded, Lopardo removed the portable clubhouses and video scoreboard, but other improvements remained in place.

In 2006 and 2007, the opening round of the Beanpot, a college baseball tournament featuring Boston College, Northeastern University, The University of Massachusetts, and Harvard University, was played at Fraser Field.

In 2008, the North Shore Navigators of the New England Collegiate Baseball League began play at Fraser, having moved from Holyoke. The club won its first NECBL title in 2010. In 2012, the Navigators were acquired by Salvi Sports Enterprises, which switched the club to the newer Futures League with its focus on larger ballparks and professional management.

In 2019, the roof had again deteriorated so as to endanger fans, and the Navigators began the season with the central seating section again roped off. In 2020, the Navigators were sold to the January family of Swampscott and netting was attached to the underside of the roof to catch any further falling concrete. The club returned to the NECBL in 2021.

== Field structure ==
The Fraser Field grandstand

Since 2022, Fraser Field has featured a fully artificial turf surface, manufactured and installed by FieldTurf.

Before 2022, the infield of was artificial turf manufactured and installed by Pro Grass LLC, while the outfield was natural grass. A drain system serves the infield and basepaths, but standing water can accumulate in the outfield from heavy rains even early in the day.

The artificial turf was redone for the 2015 baseball season, finally omitting the Spirit logo denoting the previous franchise. (Note: This is seen in the photograph at the top of this page.)

Beyond left field is the adjacent Manning Field, which succeeded the old Manning Bowl. The site of the bowl became the main parking lot for both Manning and Fraser. Ample on-street parking is also available, and the Spirit arranged with neighborhood businesses for the use of their parking lots in the evening.

The main gate and clubhouse are on Western Avenue, behind the grandstand. A secondary admission gate is adjacent to the left-field bullpen. It serves the main parking lot but requires fans to walk around the outfield. A third gate, adjacent to the right-field bullpen, has not been used in the Navigators era.
