= Dave Swartzbaugh =

American baseball player (born 1968)

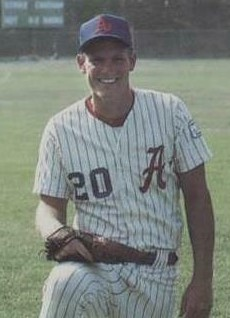
- Pitcher
- Born: February 11, 1968 (age 58); Middletown, Ohio, U.S.
- Batted: Right Threw: Right

MLB debut
- September 5, 1995, for the Chicago Cubs

Last MLB appearance
- April 22, 1997, for the Chicago Cubs

MLB statistics
- Win–loss record: 0–3
- Earned run average: 5.72
- Strikeouts: 22
- Stats at Baseball Reference

Teams
- Chicago Cubs (1995–1997)

David Theodore Swartzbaugh (born February 11, 1968) is an American former Major League Baseball pitcher who played from 1995 to 1997 for the Chicago Cubs.

== Career ==
Swartzbaugh attended Middletown High School and Miami University of Ohio. In 1988, he played collegiate summer baseball with the Chatham A's of the Cape Cod Baseball League. The 6 ft 2 in (1.88 m), 195 pound right-hander was originally drafted by the Cubs in the 9th round (224th overall) of the 1989 draft. He was used both as a starter and reliever in the minors, and saw success in both roles. For example, in 1991 with the Winston-Salem Spirits (now the Warthogs), he went 10–4 with a 1.83 ERA as a starter. As a reliever in 1995 with the Iowa Cubs, he went 3–0 with a 1.53 ERA in 30 relief appearances.

He made his big league debut on September 3, 1995 at the age of 27 against the Atlanta Braves. He was perfect in the 2/3 of an inning that made up his debut. He did well the remainder of the season, with seven relief appearances without an earned run, and striking out five in 7 1/3 innings.

Swartzbaugh's early success did not carry over into 1996 as the Cubs tried using him as a starter. He appeared in 6 games, starting 5, posting a 6.38 ERA in 24 innings of work, and striking out 13 while walking 14. The Cubs tried using him as a starter again in 1997, but he went 0–1 in 8 innings of work, which included two starts. Swartzbaugh appeared in his final major league game on April 22, 1997, and stuck around in the minors until 1999.

In his MLB career Swartzbaugh was 0–3 in 39+ innings of work, had a 5.72 career ERA, struck out 22, and walked 24. He was also 0 for 10 at the plate.

== Other information ==
- Swartzbaugh was teammates with Steve Trachsel for seven professional seasons-longer than any other teammate.
- Swartzbaugh earned $153,500 in 1997.
- He wore two numbers in his career-36 in 1995 and 1996, and 38 in 1997.

== Sources ==
- Career statistics from Baseball Reference · Baseball Reference (Minors) · Retrosheet · Baseball Almanac, or Retrosheet
