= West Haven A's =

- 1972–1982; West Haven, Connecticut

Minor league affiliations
- Class: Double-A
- League: Eastern League

Major league affiliations
- Previous teams: Oakland Athletics (1980–1982); New York Yankees (1972–1979)

Minor league titles
- League titles (5): 1972; 1976; 1977; 1979; 1982
- Division titles (4): 1972; 1976; 1977; 1982
- First-half titles (2): 1979; 1982
- Second-half titles (2): 1979; 1982

Team data
- Name: West Haven A's (1981–1982); West Haven Whitecaps (1980); West Haven Yankees (1972–1979)
- Ballpark: Quigley Stadium

The West Haven A's were an American Minor League Baseball team that played in the Double-A Eastern League from 1972 to 1982. They were located in West Haven, Connecticut, and played their home games at Quigley Stadium. From 1972 to 1979, the team was known as the West Haven Yankees after their Major League Baseball affiliate, the New York Yankees. They became an affiliate of the Oakland Athletics in 1980 and changed their name to the West Haven Whitecaps for that season before becoming the West Haven A's through their final two years of play.

== History ==
=== New York Yankees (1972–1979) ===
From 1972 to 1979, the team was affiliated with and named for the New York Yankees. During that eight-year period, West Haven — managed by future Major League skippers Bobby Cox, Doc Edwards, Mike Ferraro, and Stump Merrill — won four Eastern League championships and compiled a regular-season win–loss record of 611–496 (.552). In 1975, first baseman Dave Bergman was selected for the Eastern League Most Valuable Player Award. Edwards (1973), Ferraro (1977), and Merrill (1979) each won the Eastern League Manager of the Year Award.

==== Notable Yankees alumni ====
- Steve Balboni
- Jim Beattie
- Dave Bergman
- Ron Davis
- Mike Fischlin
- Damaso Garcia
- Ron Guidry
- Mike Heath
- LaMarr Hoyt
- Garth Iorg
- Mickey Klutts
- Joe Lefebvre
- Willie McGee
- Scott McGregor
- Doc Medich
- Jerry Narron
- Domingo Ramos
- Dave Righetti
- Buck Showalter
- Charlie Spikes
- Pat Tabler
- Willie Upshaw
- Otto Velez

=== Oakland Athletics (1980–1982) ===
The Yankees entered into a deal with a new Double-A team, the Nashville Sounds of the Southern League, after the 1979 season. The West Haven franchise relocated to Lynn, Massachusetts, and became the Lynn Sailors. Concurrently, the Waterbury, Connecticut, franchise moved to West Haven in time for the 1980 season, bringing their affiliation with the Oakland Athletics, and renaming the team the West Haven Whitecaps.

The franchise changed its name again in 1981, this time to the West Haven A's. The last West Haven team, managed by Bob Didier, won the team's fifth and final Eastern League title, defeating the Lynn Sailors in the finals. In 1983, the franchise moved to Albany, New York, becoming the Albany A's.

==== Notable alumni ====
- Keith Atherton
- Keith Comstock
- Mike Gallego
- Donnie Hill
- Bill Krueger
- Steve Ontiveros
- Tony Phillips

== Season-by-season results ==
Season	Division	Record	Win %	Finish	GB	Attendance	Manager	Postseason	MLB affiliate	Ref.
1972	American	84–56	.600	1st	—	102,537	Bobby Cox	Won American Division title Won EL championship vs. Trois-Rivières Aigles, 3–0	New York Yankees	
1973	American	72–66	.522	2nd	4	75,128	Doc Edwards	—	New York Yankees	
1974	American	58–79	.423	4th	17	42,878	Doc Edwards	—	New York Yankees	
1975 (Note: West Haven was 27–37 (.422; 7th place; 15 1/2 GB) in the first half and 39–34 (.534; 3rd place; 7 GB) in the second half.)	—	66–71	.482	4th	18	26,549	Pete Ward	—	New York Yankees	
1976	South	80–59	.576	1st	—	28,331	Pete Ward	Won South Division title Won EL championship vs. Trois-Rivières Aigles, 3–0	New York Yankees	
1977	New England	86–52	.623	1st	—	41,072	Mike Ferraro	Won New England Division title Won EL championship vs. Trois-Rivières Aigles, 3–0	New York Yankees	
1978 (Note: West Haven was 39–31 (.557; 2nd place; 1 1/2 GB) in the first half and 43–26 (.623; 2nd place; 1 GB) in the second half.)	—	82–57	.590	1st	—	46,048	Stump Merrill	—	New York Yankees	
1979 (Note: West Haven won both halves: 42–28 (.600; 1st place) in the first half and 41–28 (.594; 1st place) in the second half.)	—	83–56	.597	1st	—	71,302	Stump Merrill	Won First and Second Half titles Won EL championship	New York Yankees	
1980 (Note: West Haven was 25–44 (.362; 4th place; 16 GB) in the first half and 22–48 (.314; 4th place; 26 GB) in the second half.)	Southern	47–92	.338	4th	32	30,112	Ed Nottle	—	Oakland Athletics	
1981 (Note: West Haven was 32–37 (.571; 2nd place; 2 GB) in the first half and 31–37 (.456; 3rd place; 10 1/2 GB) in the second half.)	Southern	71–67	.514	3rd	8 1/2	55,552	Bob Didier	—	Oakland Athletics	
1982 (Note: West Haven won both halves: 42–21 (.667; 1st place) in the first half and 44–33 (.571; 1st place) in the second half.)	Southern	86–54	.614	1st	—	51,791	Bob Didier	Won First and Second Half Southern Division titles Won Southern Division title Won EL championship vs. Lynn Sailors, 3–0	Oakland Athletics	

Preceded by Manchester Yankees	New York Yankees; Double-A affiliate 1972–1979	Succeeded by Nashville Sounds
Preceded by Waterbury A's	Oakland Athletics; Double-A affiliate 1980–1982	Succeeded by Albany A's
