= Roberto Rivera (footballer) =

Mexican footballer (born 1980)

Personal information
- Full name: Roberto Rivera Contreras
- Date of birth: September 29, 1980 (age 46)
- Place of birth: Guadalajara, Jalisco, Mexico
- Height: 1.88 m (6 ft 2 in)
- Position: Defender

Senior career*
Years	Team	Apps	(Gls)
2005–2007	Chivas	1	(0)
2005	→ Chivas Coras (loan)		
2007	→ Tapatío (loan)		
2007	Dorados		
- * Club domestic league appearances and goals

Roberto Rivera (born September 29, 1980) is a Mexican footballer who played as a central defender for Chivas de Guadalajara.

== Career ==
Born in Guadalajara, Rivera began playing football in the youth sides of Toluca (Atlético Mexiquense), Cobras de Ciudad Juárez and Yucatán. In 2005, Rivera joined Chivas, where he would play for its reserve club Chivas Coras in Tepic, Nayarit. He joined Chivas' Primera División A affiliate Tapatío and eventually played once in the Primera División for the parent club. Roberto made his debut with Chivas in the 2005–2006 season. He played in Chivas' game against W Connection in the 2006-2007 CONCACAF Champions' League.

After failing to feature regularly with Chivas' first team, he joined Dorados de Sinaloa in June 2007. However, a few weeks into the season, Rivera suffered a serious knee injury.
