= Garland Kiser =

American baseball player (born 1968)

- Pitcher
- Born: July 8, 1968 (age 58); Charlotte, North Carolina
- Batted: Left Threw: Left

MLB debut
- September 9, 1991, for the Cleveland Indians

Last MLB appearance
- October 6, 1991, for the Cleveland Indians

MLB statistics
- Games pitched: 7
- Earned run average: 9.64
- Strikeouts: 3
- Stats at Baseball Reference

Teams
- Cleveland Indians (1991)

Garland Routher Kiser (born July 8, 1968) is an American former Major League Baseball player.

Kiser played baseball at Sullivan Central High School in Blountville, Tennessee. As a senior, he had a 1.78 earned run average and attracted the attention of professional scouts. He was selected by the Philadelphia Phillies in the 24th round of the 1986 Major League Baseball draft and assigned to the Bend Phillies to begin his professional career. He was released by the Phillies during spring training in 1988 but was quickly picked up by the Cleveland Indians. He made his Major League debut with the Indians on September 9, 1991 against the Boston Red Sox in front of 1,695 fans a Cleveland Stadium, the smallest crowd there for a game since 1974. He threw only one pitch in his debut, inducing a lineout from Steve Lyons to José González. He struck out the final batter he faced in the Major Leagues, Don Mattingly, on October 6, 1991.

Kiser pitched in the farm systems of the Indians, the Milwaukee Brewers and the Pittsburgh Pirates through the 1994 season. He was picked up by the Colorado Rockies before the 1995 season but released in April of that year. After not pitching in the 1995 season, he appeared in 1996 in independent baseball with the Salinas Peppers. It would be his final season in professional baseball.
