= Mike Hubbard (baseball) =

American baseball player (born 1971)

- Catcher
- Born: February 16, 1971 (age 55); Lynchburg, Virginia, U.S.
- Batted: Right Threw: Right

MLB debut
- July 13, 1995, for the Chicago Cubs

Last MLB appearance
- June 13, 2001, for the Texas Rangers

MLB statistics
- Batting average: .167
- Home runs: 4
- Runs batted in: 11
- Stats at Baseball Reference

Teams
- Chicago Cubs (1995–1997); Montreal Expos (1998); Atlanta Braves (2000); Texas Rangers (2001)

Michael Wayne Hubbard (born February 16, 1971) is an American former baseball player who played catcher in the Major Leagues from 1995 to 2001. He played for the Montreal Expos, Chicago Cubs, Texas Rangers, and Atlanta Braves.
