= Bill Kern (baseball) =

American baseball player (1933–2025)

- Left fielder
- Born: February 28, 1933; Coplay, Pennsylvania, U.S.
- Died: October 19, 2025 (aged 92); Bethlehem, Pennsylvania, U.S.
- Batted: Right Threw: Right

MLB debut
- September 19, 1962, for the Kansas City Athletics

Last MLB appearance
- September 30, 1962, for the Kansas City Athletics

MLB statistics
- Batting average: .250
- Home runs: 1
- Runs batted in: 1
- Stats at Baseball Reference

Teams
- Kansas City Athletics (1962)

William George Kern (February 28, 1933 – October 19, 2025) was an American Major League Baseball outfielder. After nine seasons in minor league baseball, Kern had an eight-game trial with the Kansas City Athletics during the 1962 season. He had signed with the team in 1954, when they were still based in Philadelphia. Kern attended Muhlenberg College, graduating in 1954.

Kern threw and batted right-handed, stood 6 feet 2 inches (1.88 m) tall and weighed 184 pounds (83 kg). He batted over .300 four times and hit 144 home runs during his minor-league career. In September 1962, at age 29, he was recalled by the Athletics after he batted .315 with 27 home runs and 97 runs batted in for the Triple-A Portland Beavers. Kern appeared in eight games played, batting 16 times with four hits. In his first MLB game, he pinch hit for Moe Drabowsky and singled off Dick Donovan of the Cleveland Indians. In his final MLB game, as the A's starting left fielder, he hit his lone Major League home run off future Baseball Hall of Fame pitcher (and United States Senator) Jim Bunning, then with the Detroit Tigers.

Kern died in Bethlehem, Pennsylvania on October 19, 2025, at the age of 92.
