= Quigley Stadium (West Haven) =

Baseball stadium in West Haven, Connecticut

Quigley Memorial Stadium
- Location within Connecticut
- Former names: Exhibition Stadium then Municipal Stadium
- Location: 362 Front Avenue; West Haven, CT 06516
- Coordinates: 41.293479°N 72.955961°W
- Capacity: 2,000
- Surface: grass

Construction
- Opened: June 20, 1947

Tenants
- NDWH Baseball ( to present); NDWH Football ( to 2007); West Haven Yankees (EL) (1972-1979); West Haven Whitecaps (EL) (1980); West Haven A's (EL) (1981-1982); SCSU Baseball (1984-2001)

Quigley Stadium is a stadium in West Haven, Connecticut, United States. It was originally built in 1947 from surplus bleachers that were once installed on flat bed light rail cars and towed alongside the Yale crew team as they competed off of nearby Orange Avenue. Maurice P. Quigley purchased these surplus bleachers off the rail cars and had them hauled approximately 1 mile to the current site which gave the field a capacity of 2,000 people. It opened on June 20, 1947. It was originally called Exhibition Stadium but subsequently renamed for Maurice P. Quigley, who built the ballpark and owned the semi-professional West Haven Sailors who played there, as well as Ship's Tavern in West Haven, a popular hangout among sports fans. Quigley sold the ballpark to the Town of West Haven in 1951.

It is primarily used for baseball and was home to the West Haven Yankees and West Haven A's. The bleachers were razed in 1987. It is the current home of the Notre Dame (West Haven) High School baseball team and West Haven Twilight League amateur baseball league.
