= Thurman Munson Memorial Stadium =

Baseball stadium in Canton, Ohio

Coordinates: 40.771653°N 81.382819°W

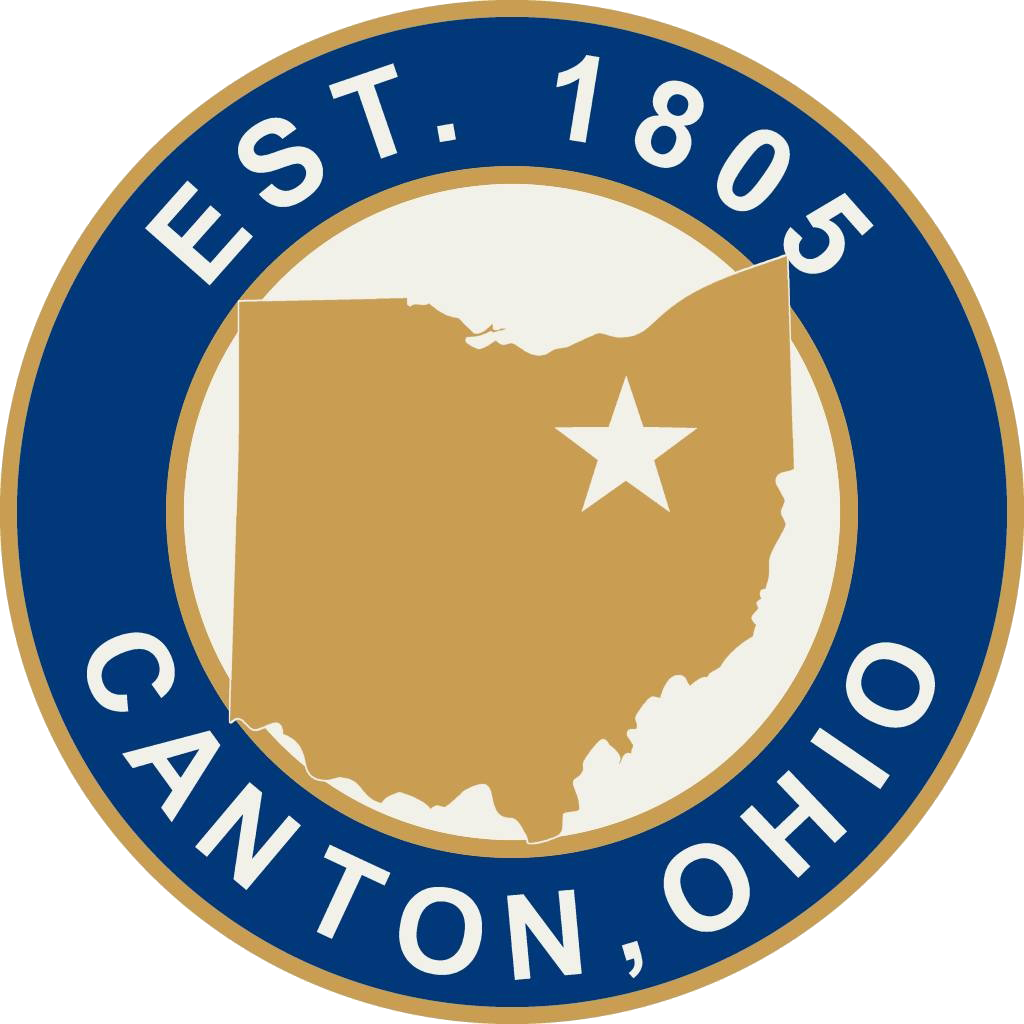

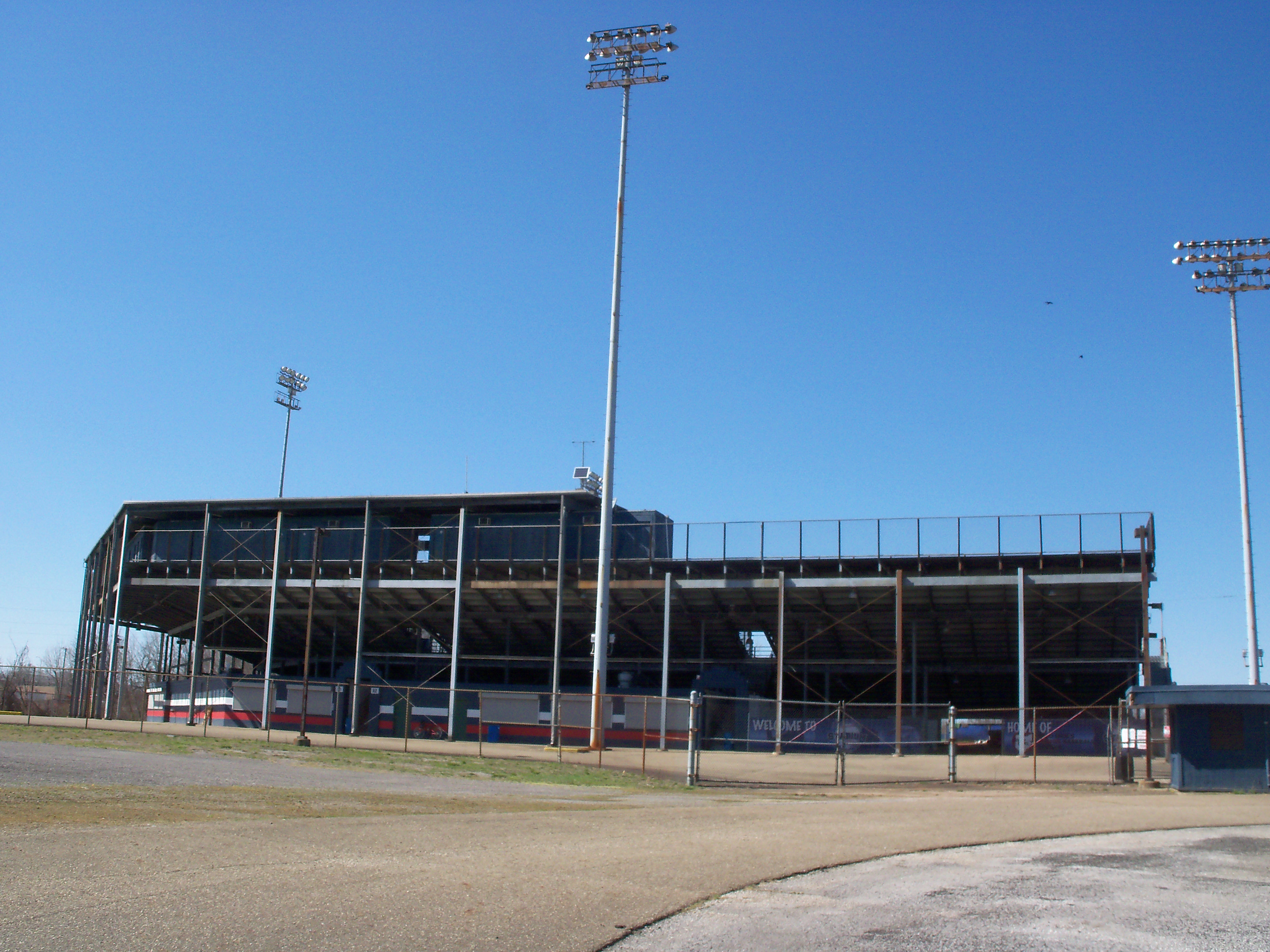
- Exterior view of the stadium in 2016
- Interactive map of Thurman Munson; Memorial Stadium
- Address: 2501 Allen Ave. SE; Canton, OH; United States
- Owner: City of Canton
- Operator: Ohio Men's Senior Baseball League
- Capacity: 5,700
- Type: Ballpark
- Field size: Left field – 330 ft Center field – 400 ft Right field – 330 ft
- Current use: Baseball

Construction
- Opened: 1989; 37 years ago

Tenants
- Canton McKinley Bulldogs (OHSAA) 2016–present; Malone Pioneers (NCAA) 2008–2015, 2021–present; Canton Coyotes (FL) 2002; Canton Crocodiles (FL) 1997–2001; Canton–Akron Indians (EL) 1989–1996

Website
- visitcanton.com/munson-stadium

Thurman Munson Memorial Stadium is a baseball stadium in Canton, Ohio, United States. Owned by the city of Canton, the facility is named after former MLB player Thurman Munson, who grew up in Canton. Munson was a catcher for the New York Yankees who was killed when his private plane was attempting to land at Akron–Canton Airport in Summit County on August 2, 1979. Munson's number 15 is displayed on the center field wall. Originally built as the home of the minor league Canton–Akron Indians, it has since hosted other minor league teams, as well has college, high school, and amateur baseball.

== History ==
The ballpark opened in 1989 with a capacity of 5,700 people. It is constructed almost entirely of aluminum and was built as the home of the Canton–Akron Indians, the Double-A minor league affiliate of the Indians, which played at the ballpark from 1989 to 1996. Citing poor field drainage, Mike Agganis, then-owner of the Indians, relocated the team to the brand new Canal Park in downtown Akron prior to the start of the 1997 season. The team was renamed the Akron Aeros.

Following the departure of the Indians, Thurman Munson Stadium became the home of the Canton Crocodiles, a team of the independent Frontier League, through 2001. Prior to the 2002 season, the Crocodiles moved to Washington, Pennsylvania, and became the Washington Wild Things. They were replaced by the Canton Coyotes, also of the Frontier League. After one season in Canton, the Coyotes moved to Columbia, Missouri, and became the Mid-Missouri Mavericks.

== Tenants ==
The stadium currently serves as home for the Ohio Men's Senior Baseball League, an amateur adult baseball league whose offices are housed in the stadium. It also serves as the home field for the Canton McKinley High School baseball team, as well as the Malone Pioneers baseball team from Malone University. Malone played home games at the ballpark from 2008 through the 2015 season, and returned in 2021 after playing home games primarily at nearby Jackson High School from 2016 through the 2020 season. The ballpark hosts additional high school games and tournaments throughout the season.

Canton McKinley began using the stadium for all home baseball games in 2016 and made the change permanent in 2021. As part of a 25-year lease with the city of Canton signed in 2021, the Canton City Schools also funded several upgrades to the stadium.
