= Lynn Sailors =

Minor league baseball team (1980–1983)

- 1980–1983; Lynn, Massachusetts

Minor league affiliations
- Class: Double-A (1980–1983)
- League: Eastern League (1980–1983)

Major league affiliations
- Team: Pittsburgh Pirates (1983); Seattle Mariners (1980–1982)

Minor league titles
- Division titles (1): 1982

Team data
- Name: Lynn Pirates (1983); Lynn Sailors (1980–1982)
- Colors: Blue, gold, white
- Ballpark: Fraser Field (1980–1983)
- Owner(s)/ Operator(s): Kern and Zeig Sports, Inc.

The Lynn Sailors were a Minor League Baseball franchise that originated in 1980 in Lynn, Massachusetts. The Sailors were affiliated with the Seattle Mariners from 1980 to 1982 and with the Pittsburgh Pirates in 1983, when they were known as the Lynn Pirates. They were a member of the Eastern League in Double-A and played at Fraser Field. After the 1983 season, the franchise was moved to Burlington, Vermont, and became the Vermont Reds.

== Lynn Sailors (1980–82) ==
The Lynn Tigers of the New England League, the city's last professional baseball franchise, folded iduring the 1949 season.

Lynn Sailors cap (top) and jersey (bottom) insignia

After more than 30 years without a professional team, Lynn returned to minor league baseball in 1980, when the owners of the West Haven Yankees moved the franchise to Boston's North Shore. The Seattle Mariners, founded as an expansion team in 1977, were slowly building out their farm system and did not field a Double-A affiliate before 1980. During the 1979–80 offseason, the New York Yankees moved their Double-A affiliation to the Nashville Sounds of the Southern League, and the Mariners replaced them as sponsors of the relocated West Haven franchise, the Lynn Sailors. (Complicating matters further, the Oakland Athletics placed an expansion Eastern League team in West Haven called the Whitecaps and the Glens Falls White Sox also entered the league in 1980.)

The three Sailors teams were competitive, but sparse media coverage was partially to blame for the less-than-enthusiastic showing at the gate. The inaugural edition of the Sailors drew 50,786 fans. It would be the highwater mark for the franchise's four-year history but ranked next to last in the Eastern League. In the fall of 1981, after Sailor attendance dropped to 38,468, Mike Agganis, nephew of former Red Sox player and Lynn sporting legend Harry Agganis, purchased the franchise.

The 1982 Sailors captured the Eastern League North Division pennant by 51/2 games and swept Glens Falls in the opening round of the playoffs, before falling to West Haven in the finals. But attendance dropped to an all-time low: 23,791—more than 28,000 fans fewer than the league's second-worst draw.

After the season, the Mariners left Lynn and signed a player development contract with the Chattanooga Lookouts, also a Southern League franchise.

== Lynn Pirates (1983) ==
In 1983, the Pirates were forced to move their Double-A affiliation from the Buffalo Bisons (then in the Eastern League) and succeeded the Mariners in Lynn as parent club of the renamed Lynn Pirates.

The Pirates made the playoffs with the second-best overall record in the Eastern League. They swept the Bisons in the best-of-three opening round before losing, two games to one, to the New Britain Red Sox in the finals. Because of poor regular-season attendance in Lynn (only 31,575 came through the turnstiles), all the postseason games were played on the road. The Lynn Pirates' last game was a 3–0 playoff loss at New Britain—a three-hit, 10-strikeout shutout by Roger Clemens, then finishing his first professional season. After the playoffs, the Lynn franchise moved to Burlington, Vermont, for 1984, affiliated with the Cincinnati Reds, and became the Vermont Reds. The Sailors/Pirates franchise spent five seasons (1984–88) in Burlington and is now the Akron RubberDucks.

Professional baseball did not return to Lynn until 1996 when the Massachusetts Mad Dogs of the independent Northeast League began play at Fraser Field.

== Season-by-season record ==
Season	PDC	Division	Finish	Wins	Losses	Win%	GB	Postseason	Manager	Attendance
Lynn Sailors
1980	SEA	North	3rd	66	71	.482	11		Bobby Floyd	50,786
1981	SEA	North	3rd	62	76	.449	22.5		Bobby Floyd	38,468
1982	SEA	North	1st	85	57	.599	0	Defeated Glens Falls in division series 2-0; Lost to West Heaven in championship series 0-3	Mickey Bowers	23,791
Lynn Pirates
1983	PIT	No divisions	2nd	77	62	.482	18.5	Defeated Buffalo in semi-final series 2–0; Lost to New Britain in championship series 1–3	Tommy Sandt	31,575

== Notable players ==
=== As Seattle Mariners affiliate (1980–82) ===
- Karl Best
- Bud Black
- Al Chambers
- Alvin Davis
- Mario Díaz
- Jerry Don Gleaton
- Vance McHenry
- Orlando Mercado
- Mike Moore
- John Moses
- Jamie Nelson
- Donell Nixon
- Spike Owen
- Jim Presley
- Harold Reynolds
- Paul Serna
- Dave Valle
- Matt Young

=== As Pittsburgh Pirates affiliate (1983) ===
- Rafael Belliard
- Mike Bielecki
- Stan Cliburn
- Benny Distefano
- Sam Khalifa
- Dale Mohorcic
- Nelson Norman
- Rick Renteria
- Don Robinson
- Tommy Sandt
- Jeff Zaske
