= Roberto Rivera (baseball) =

Puerto Rican baseball player (born 1969)

- Pitcher
- Born: January 1, 1969 (age 57); Bayamón, Puerto Rico
- Batted: Left Threw: Left

MLB debut
- September 3, 1995, for the Chicago Cubs

Last MLB appearance
- May 5, 1999, for the San Diego Padres

MLB statistics
- Win–loss record: 1–2
- Earned run average: 4.50
- Strikeouts: 5
- Stats at Baseball Reference

Teams
- Chicago Cubs (1995); San Diego Padres (1999)

Roberto Rivera Díaz (born January 1, 1969) is a Puerto Rican former Major League Baseball player. He made his MLB debut with the Chicago Cubs in 1995. He last played in the majors for the San Diego Padres in 1999.

== Professional career ==
Rivera played 7 games for the Chicago Cubs in 1995 where he had an ERA of 5.40. While in 1999 he played 12 games of the San Diego Padres where he finished with an ERA of 3.86.
