= 2025 Frontier League season =

32nd annual season of the Frontier League

- League: Frontier League
- Sport: Baseball
- Duration: May 8 – August 31 (Playoffs: September 3 – September 21)
- Games: 96 (768 games in total)
- Teams: 18

East Division
- League champions: Québec Capitales

West Division
- League champions: Schaumburg Boomers

Frontier League Championship
- Champions: Québec Capitales
- Runners-up: Schaumburg Boomers
- Finals MVP: Anthony Calarco, Schaumburg Boomers

Seasons
- ← 2024 2026 →

The 2025 Frontier League season was the 32nd season of operation (31st season of play) of the Frontier League (FL). The regular season began on May 8, 2025, and ended on August 31. The playoffs concluded on September 21, with the Québec Capitales defeating the Schaumburg Boomers in the finals in five games, winning their fourth consecutive championship and 11th in franchise history.

== Team changes ==
On September 17, 2024, Cameron McRae, a business owner from North Carolina, became the primary owner of the Down East Bird Dawgs. The team began play in May 2025.

Also in 2025, the Mississippi Mud Monsters began play after the league awarded the franchise to Mississippi on September 9, 2024.

== Regular season standings ==
- y – Clinched division
- x – Clinched playoff spot
- e – Eliminated from playoff contention

=== Atlantic Conference - East Division ===
Team	W	L	Pct.	GB
y - Sussex County Miners	53	43	.552	–
x - New York Boulders	52	43	.547	.5
e - Down East Bird Dawgs	37	58	.479	15.5
e - New Jersey Jackals	28	65	.301	23.5

=== Atlantic Conference - North Division ===
Team	W	L	Pct.	GB
y - Québec Capitales	67	29	.698	–
x - Tri-City ValleyCats	62	34	.646	5
e - Ottawa Titans	51	43	.531	16
e - Brockton Rox	38	54	.413	27
e - Trois-Rivières Aigles	38	57	.400	28.5

=== Midwest Conference - Central Division ===
Team	W	L	Pct.	GB
y - Washington Wild Things	54	42	.563	–
x - Lake Erie Crushers	52	42	.553	1
e - Florence Y'alls	43	53	.448	11
e - Evansville Otters	40	56	.417	14

=== Midwest Conference - West Division ===
Team	W	L	Pct.	GB
y - Schaumburg Boomers	58	38	.604	–
x - Gateway Grizzlies	56	40	.583	2
e - Mississippi Mud Monsters	49	47	.510	9
e - Joliet Slammers	44	52	.458	14
e - Windy City ThunderBolts	36	60	.375	22

== Playoffs ==
=== Format ===
The teams with the highest winning percentage (when calculated to three decimal places) in each respective division at the end of the season will qualify for the playoffs and receive the top two seeds in their conference, regardless of final record. The next two best records in each conference as determined by winning percentage (calculated to three (3) decimal places) will also qualify for the playoffs as wild card teams.

=== Playoff results ===
==== Wild Card Round ====
===== Quebec vs. New York =====
Quebec won the series, 2-0.

Game	Date	Score	Location	Time	Attendance
1	September 3	Quebec Capitales 11, New York Boulders 4	Clover Stadium	-	587
2	September 5	New York Boulders 0, Quebec Capitales 4	Stade Canac	-	4,297

===== Tri-City vs. Sussex County =====
Tri-City won the series, 2-0.

Game	Date	Score	Location	Time	Attendance
1	September 3	Sussex County 1, Tri-City 5	Joseph L. Bruno Stadium	-	2,020
2	September 5	Tri-City 4, Sussex County 3	Skylands Stadium	-	2,097

===== Gateway vs. Washington =====
Gateway won the series, 2-0.

Game	Date	Score	Location	Time	Attendance
1	September 3	Washington 5, Gateway 6	Arsenal BG Ballpark	-	-
2	September 5	Gateway 9, Washington 4	EQT Park	-	2,586

===== Schaumburg vs. Lake Erie =====
Schaumburg won the series, 2-0.

Game	Date	Score	Location	Time	Attendance
1	September 3	Schaumburg 9, Lake Erie 3	Crushers Stadium	-	1,582
2	September 5	Lake Erie 3, Schaumburg 5	Wintrust Field	-	-

==== Conference Finals ====
===== Quebec vs. Tri-City =====
Quebec won the series, 3-1.

Game	Date	Score	Location	Time	Attendance
1	September 9	Quebec 4, Tri-City 2	Joseph L. Bruno Stadium	-	2,097
2	September 10	Quebec 6, Tri-City 7	Joseph L. Bruno Stadium	-	1,605
3	September 12	Tri-City 2, Quebec 17	Stade Canac	-	4,297
4	September 13	Tri-City 5, Quebec 10	Stade Canac	-	4,297

===== Schaumburg vs. Gateway =====
Schaumburg won the series, 3-0.

Game	Date	Score	Location	Time	Attendance
1	September 9	Gateway 6, Schaumburg 11	Wintrust Field	-	-
2	September 10	Gateway 0, Schaumburg 9	Wintrust Field	-	-
3	September 12	Schaumburg 4, Gateway 2	Arsenal BG Ballpark	-	-

==== Championship Finals ====
===== Quebec vs. Schaumburg =====
Quebec won the series, 3-2.

Game	Date	Score	Location	Time	Attendance
1	September 16	Schaumburg 7, Quebec 1	Stade Canac	-	4,297
2	September 17	Schaumburg 2, Quebec 4	Stade Canac	-	4,297
3	September 19	Quebec 6, Schaumburg 10	Wintrust Field	-	5,243
4	September 20	Quebec 14, Schaumburg 8	Wintrust Field	-	4,523
5	September 21	Quebec 6, Schaumburg 5	Wintrust Field	-	-

== End of year awards ==
Award	Player	Team
Most Valuable Player	Anthony Calarco	Schaumburg Boomers
Pitcher of the Year	Braeden Allemann	Québec Capitales
Rookie of the Year	Ian Battipaglia	Joliet Slammers
Manager of the Year	Patrick Scalabrini	Québec Capitales
Executive of the Year	Martin Boyce	Ottawa Titans
