= 2024 Frontier League season =

31st annual season of the Frontier League

- League: Frontier League
- Sport: Baseball
- Duration: May 9 – September 1 (Playoffs: September 3 – September 14)
- Games: 96 (768 games in total)
- Teams: 16

East Division
- League champions: Québec Capitales

West Division
- League champions: Washington Wild Things

Frontier League Championship
- Champions: Québec Capitales
- Runners-up: Washington Wild Things
- Finals MVP: Caleb McNeely, Washington Wild Things

Seasons
- ← 2023 2025 →

The 2024 Frontier League season was the 31st season of operation (30th season of play) of the Frontier League (FL). The regular season began on May 9, 2024, and ended on September 1, 2024.

The playoffs concluded on September 14, with the Québec Capitales defeating the Washington Wild Things in the finals in four games, winning their third consecutive championship and 10th in franchise history.

== Team and rule changes ==
After the 2023 season, the league announced a new expansion team had been awarded to Brockton, Massachusetts, and the team would play in Campanelli Stadium. On December 15, 2023, the expansion team was named the Knockouts.

As a result of the league announcing the New England Knockouts as the new expansion franchise, the Empire State Greys would not return for the 2024 season and would be dormant.

The 16 teams in the league are split evenly between two divisions, East and West.

The season be played with a 96-game schedule; teams played four series, two home and two road, against their seven division rivals. Each team visited two clubs from the opposite division while hosting two different teams. The top three teams in each division qualified for the playoffs, with the first-place teams qualified as regular season champions, and the second and third-place teams played each other in a wild card game.

The FL's total player compensation budget was increased by $520,000 compared to 2023 to a total of $895,000 with a minimum of $26,200 per player.

== Regular season standings ==
East Division Regular Season Standings
Pos	Team	G	W	L	Pct.	GB
1	y – Québec Capitales	95	64	31	.674	--
2	x – Tri-City ValleyCats	93	52	41	.559	11.0
3	x – Ottawa Titans	94	52	42	.553	11.5
4	e – New York Boulders	96	52	44	.537	13.0
5	e – Trois-Rivières Aigles	95	44	51	.463	19.0
6	e – New England Knockouts	93	38	55	.409	25.0
7	e – New Jersey Jackals	94	33	61	.351	30.5
8	e – Sussex County Miners	95	33	62	.347	31.0

West Division Regular Season Standings
Pos	Team	G	W	L	Pct.	GB
1	y – Washington Wild Things	93	65	28	.699	--
2	x – Gateway Grizzlies	94	58	36	.617	7.5
3	x – Lake Erie Crushers	95	51	44	.543	14.5
4	e – Schaumburg Boomers	96	51	45	.531	14.5
5	e – Florence Y'alls	94	44	50	.468	21.5
6	e – Evansville Otters	96	41	55	.427	25.5
7	e – Windy City ThunderBolts	96	40	56	.417	26.5
8	e – Joliet Slammers	95	37	58	.389	29.0

- y – Clinched division
- x – Clinched playoff spot
- e – Eliminated from playoff contention

== Statistical leaders ==
=== Hitting ===
Stat	Player	Team	Total
HR	John Cristino	New England Knockouts	26
AVG	Tyreque Reed	Washington Wild Things	.341
RBIs	Matt Warkentin	Joliet Slammers	83
SB	Austin White	New England Knockouts	60

=== Pitching ===
Stat	Player	Team	Total
W	James Bradwell	Québec Capitales	12
ERA	Kevin Pindel	Windy City ThunderBolts	2.00
SO	Deylen Miley	Gateway Grizzlies	161
SV	Gyeongju Kim	Washington Wild Things	28

== Awards ==
=== All-star selections ===
==== East Division ====
Elected starters
Position	Player	Team
C	John Cristino	Knockouts
1B	Dalton Combs	Aigles
2B	Cory Acton	Miners
3B	AJ Wright	Titans
SS	Austin Dennis	Boulders
OF	David Vinsky	Boulders
OF	LP Pelletier	Aigles
OF	Justin Gideon	Capitales

Reserves
Position	Player	Team
C	Oscar Campos	ValleyCats
C	Joe DeLuca	Boulders
1B	Peyton Isaacson	Boulders
2B	Jesmuel Valentín	Capitales
3B	Chris Kwitzer	Boulders
SS	Kyle Crowl	Capitales
OF	Raphael Gladu	Aigles
OF	Austin White	Knockouts
OF	Jonathan Lacroix	Capitales

Pitchers
Player	Team
Brandon Backman	Boulders
Erasmo Pinales	Titans
Ryan Sandberg	Capitales
Tucker Smith	Aigles
Frank Moscatiello	Capitales
Blaine Traxel	Boulders
Dylan Smith	Boulders
Yuhi Sako	Jackals
Grant Larson	Titans
James Bradwell	Capitales

==== West Division ====
Elected starters
Position	Player	Team
C	Alfredo González	Crushers
1B	Matthew Warkentin	Slammers
2B	Alec Craig	Boomers
3B	DJ Stewart	Grizzlies
SS	Tyler Depreta-Johnson	Boomers
OF	Christian Fedko	Boomers
OF	TJ Reeves	Y'alls
OF	Hank Zeisler	Y'alls

Reserves
Position	Player	Team
C	Sergio Gutierrez	Y'alls
C	Drew Stengren	Slammers
C	John Tuccillo	Crushers
1B	David Mendham	Otters
1B	Christian Kuzemka	ThunderBolts
2B	Gabe Holt	Grizzlies
2B	Ed Johnson	Y'alls
3B	Brian Fuentes	Y'alls
3B	Logan Thomason	Crushers
SS	Abdiel Diaz	Grizzlies
SS	Jarrod Watkins	Crushers
OF	Caleb McNeely	Wild Things
OF	Chase Dawson	Boomers

Pitchers
Player	Team
Jack Eisenbarger	Crushers
Kevin Pindel	ThunderBolts
Cole Cook	Boomers
Gyeongju Kim	Wild Things
Zach Kirby	Wild Things
Kobe Foster	Wild Things
Christian Scafidi	Crushers
Anthony Escobar	Crushers
Trevor Kuncl	Crushers
Lukas Veinbergs	Grizzlies
Ben Terwilliger	Y'alls
Zach Smith	Otters
Christian James	Wild Things

All-star game MVP — David Mendham (Evansville Otters)

=== End of year awards ===
Award	Player	Team
Most Valuable Player	Caleb McNeely	Washington Wild Things
Pitcher of the Year	James Bradwell	Québec Capitales
Rookie of the Year	TJ Reeves	Florence Y'alls
Manager of the Year	Patrick Scalabrini	Québec Capitales

== Playoffs ==
=== Format ===
The second-place team will host the third-place team from their division in a wild-card game on September 3. The winner of these games will face their division winners in a best-of-three divisional series, with the division winners hosting games 2 and 3 (if necessary). The championship playoffs shall be scheduled to begin on the second day following the scheduled completion of the division playoffs. The championship series will be a best-of-five format. The team advancing with the best regular-season record will host games 3, 4, and 5 (if necessary). In the event of a tie, tie-breaking procedures as outlined in league rules will be utilized.

=== Playoff bracket ===
Wild Card Game
3	Ottawa Titans	5
2	Tri-City ValleyCats	2
3	Lake Erie Crushers	10
2	Gateway Grizzlies	8

Division Series (best-of-three)
East Division
3	Ottawa Titans	2	6	7
1	Québec Capitales	1	10	8
West Division
3	Lake Erie Crushers	0	0	X
1	Washington Wild Things	2	10	X

Championship Series (best-of-five)
E	Québec Capitales	2	11	8	7	X
W	Washington Wild Things	5	6	6	6	X

== Notable players ==
Former Major League Baseball players who played in the Frontier League in 2024

- Mario Feliciano (Trois-Rivières)
- Miguel Gómez (New Jersey)
- Alfredo González (Lake Erie)
- Alfredo Marte (New York)
- Jesen Therrien (Trois-Rivières)
- Jesmuel Valentín (Québec)

Other notable players who played in the Frontier League in 2024

- Chris Kwitzer (New York)
- Assaf Lowengart (New York)
- Brandon Marklund (Québec)
- Brandon McIlwain (Washington)
- Robb Paller (New Jersey)
- Juremi Profar (Québec)
- Roniel Raudes (New Jersey)

== See also ==
- 2024 American Association season
- 2024 Major League Baseball season
- 2024 Pecos League season
