= Santiago Florez =

Colombian baseball player (born 2000)

Joliet Slammers
- Pitcher
- Born: May 9, 2000 (age 25); Barranquilla, Colombia
- Bats: Right Throws: Right
Medals
Men's baseball
Representing Colombia
Pan American Games
Gold medal – first place	2023 Santiago	Team

Santiago Jesús Florez Payan (born May 9, 2000) is a Colombian professional baseball pitcher for the Joliet Slammers of the Frontier League.

== Career ==
=== Pittsburgh Pirates ===
On July 2, 2016, Florez signed with the Pittsburgh Pirates for a $150,000 signing bonus. He made his professional debut for the Dominican Summer League Pirates, starting 14 contests and posting a 4.56 ERA with 30 strikeouts. In 2018, Florez pitched for the rookie–level Gulf Coast League Pirates, starting 10 games and recording a 4.15 ERA with 35 strikeouts across 43 1/3 innings pitched. In 2019, he pitched for the rookie–level Bristol Pirates, making 10 starts and registering a 2–2 record and 3.46 ERA with 36 strikeouts across 41 2/3 innings of work.

Florez did not play in a game in 2020 due to the cancellation of the minor league season because of the COVID-19 pandemic. He returned to action in 2021 with the Single–A Bradenton Marauders and High–A Greensboro Grasshoppers. In 21 games (18 starts), Florez accumulated an 8–5 record and 4.14 ERA with 107 strikeouts and one save across 95 2/3 innings pitched.

In 2022, Florez returned to Greensboro, pitching in 32 games and struggling to a 6.50 ERA with 61 strikeouts across 63 2/3 innings of work. He began the 2023 season with the Greensboro, his third straight year with the affiliate. In 37 relief appearances, he struggled to a 7.08 ERA with 40 strikeouts across 40 2/3 innings of work. Florez elected free agency following the season on November 6, 2023.

=== Sioux City Explorers ===
On January 30, 2024, Florez signed with the Sioux City Explorers of the American Association of Professional Baseball. In 10 appearances for the Explorers, he compiled a 4.09 ERA with 8 strikeouts across 11 innings pitched. Florez was released by Sioux City on July 25.

=== Southern Maryland Blue Crabs ===
On February 27, 2025, Florez signed with the Washington Wild Things of the Frontier League. However, he was traded to the Southern Maryland Blue Crabs of the Atlantic League of Professional Baseball on May 6. In 10 appearances for Southern Maryland, Florez struggled to a 10.13 ERA with 12 strikeouts across 10 2/3 innings pitched. Florez was released by the Blue Crabs on June 28.

=== Joliet Slammers ===
On March 29, 2026, Florez signed with the Joliet Slammers of the Frontier League.

== International career ==
Florez represented the Colombia national baseball team in the 2023 World Baseball Classic, pitching in Colombia's game against the United States. Florez was part of the Colombian squad that won the gold medal at the 2023 Pan American Games contested in Santiago, Chile in October 2023.
