= Andrew Case =

Canadian baseball player (born 1993)

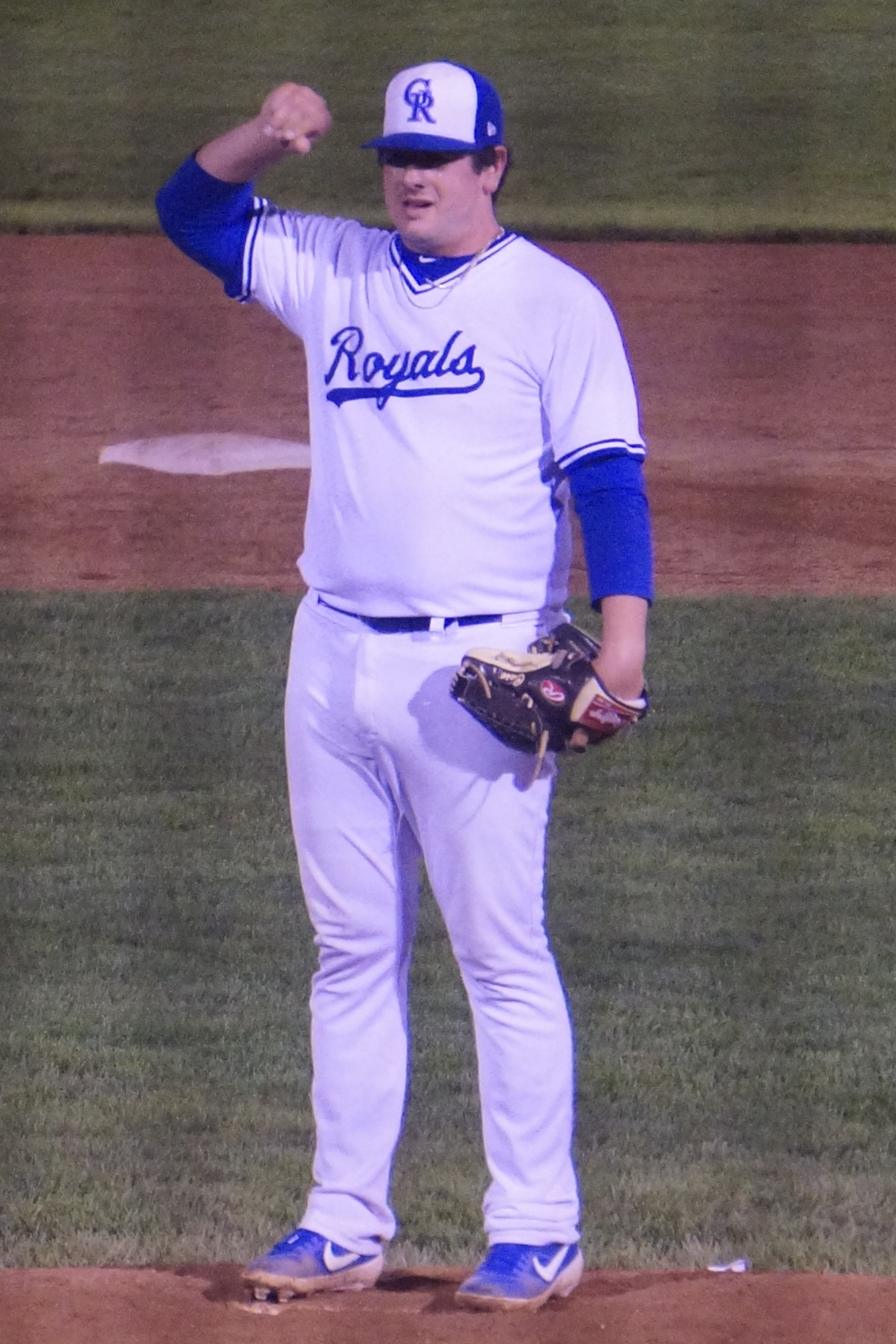
- Case with the Guelph Royals

Guelph Royals – No. 51
- Pitcher
- Born: January 6, 1993 (age 33); Saint John, New Brunswick, Canada
- Bats: Right Throws: Right
- Stats at Baseball Reference

Andrew Paul William Case (born January 6, 1993) is a Canadian professional baseball pitcher for the Guelph Royals of the Canadian Baseball League (CBL). He was signed by the Toronto Blue Jays as an undrafted free agent in 2013.

== Career ==
Case attended Lethbridge College in Lethbridge, Alberta.

=== Toronto Blue Jays ===
Case signed with the Toronto Blue Jays as an undrafted free agent on October 16, 2013. He drew the attention of the Blue Jays after throwing a no-hitter during "Tournament 12", an annual tournament for the top college players in Canada. He was assigned to the Low-A Vancouver Canadians for the entire 2014 season, and was a mid-season All-Star for the Canadians. He pitched to a 0–1 win–loss record, 2.45 earned run average (ERA), and 37 strikeouts in 44 innings that year. He split time in 2015 between Vancouver and the Single-A Lansing Lugnuts. Case made 39 total relief appearances in the 2015 season, and posted a 3–4 record, 3.10 ERA, and 44 strikeouts in 52 1/3 total innings, and was again named a mid-season All-Star for Vancouver. Before the start of the 2016 season, Case was suspended for 50-games for failing to take a drug test. He made one appearance for the Rookie-level Gulf Coast League Blue Jays and was then promoted to Lansing, where he finished the season. In 25 2/3 total innings, Case posted a 0–2 record, 2.10 ERA, and 22 strikeouts in the 2016 campaign. During the offseason, Case made nine relief appearances for the Canberra Cavalry of the Australian Baseball League (ABL). Case opened 2017 with the High-A Dunedin Blue Jays, and later earned promotions to the Double-A New Hampshire Fisher Cats and Triple-A Buffalo Bisons, posting a combined 7–1 record with a 2.84 ERA in a career-high 66 innings pitched.

On January 24, 2018, the Blue Jays invited Case to spring training. Case did not make the club and spent the year split between Buffalo and New Hampshire, posting a 1-3 record and 4.96 ERA with 35 strikeouts in 49 innings of work between the two teams. He was assigned to New Hampshire to begin the 2019 season, and posted a 5.40 ERA in three games. On April 18, 2019, Case announced his retirement from professional baseball.

=== Québec Capitales ===
Case initially came out of retirement in 2020 to sign with the Québec Capitales of the Frontier League, but did not play in a game for the team following the cancellation of the Frontier League season due to the COVID-19 pandemic. On February 15, 2021, Case re-signed with Québec. Case made 14 appearances for the Capitales, posting a 3.29 ERA with 12 strikeouts in 13 2/3 innings pitched.

=== Olmecas de Tabasco ===
On July 17, 2021, Case signed with the Olmecas de Tabasco of the Mexican League. In 10 relief appearances, Case posted a 2-0 record with a 1.80 ERA and nine strikeouts. He was released following the season on October 20.

=== Québec Capitales (second stint) ===
On May 11, 2022, Case re-signed with the Québec Capitales of the Frontier League. Case made two appearances for Québec, pitching two scoreless innings out of the bullpen.

=== Piratas de Campeche ===
On June 4, 2022, Case's contract was purchased by the Piratas de Campeche of the Mexican League. In five appearances for Campeche, Case recorded a 2.08 ERA with one strikeout in 4 1/3 innings pitched.

=== Guelph Royals ===
On July 6, 2022, Case signed with the Guelph Royals of the Intercounty Baseball League. In 15 games for the team, he logged a 2.07 ERA with 19 strikeouts and five saves in 17 1/3 innings pitched.

On July 24, 2023, Case re–signed with the Royals. In three games, he recorded a 5.68 ERA with seven strikeouts across 6 1/3 innings of work. On August 11, Case was released by Guelph.

On July 28, 2025, Case re-signed with the Royals following a year of inactivity. He made five appearances for Guelph, recording a 1.80 ERA with 11 strikeouts over 10 innings of work.

On February 5, 2026, Case re-signed with the Royals, now a part of the Canadian Baseball League.

== International career ==
Case played for Team Canada at the 2017 World Baseball Classic and 2019 Pan American Games Qualifier.
