= Washington Wild Things =

Frontier League baseball team in Washington, Pennsylvania

- Founded in 1997 in Canton, Ohio; Based in Washington, Pennsylvania since 2002
Team logo
Cap insignia

Minor league affiliations
- Class: Independent (1997–present)
- League: National Association of Professional Baseball (1997–present)
- Conference: Midwest Conference
- Division: Central Division

Minor league titles
- League titles (1): 1997
- Division titles (11): 2002; 2004; 2005; 2006; 2007; 2018; 2021; 2022; 2024; 2025; 2026

Team data
- Name: Washington Wild Things (2002–present)
- Previous names: Canton Crocodiles (1997–2001)
- Colors: Black, red, periwinkle, white, tan
- Ballpark: EQT Park
- Owner(s)/ Operator(s): Stu and Francine Williams
- General manager: Vacant
- Manager: Tom Vaeth
- Media: Observer–Reporter; HomeTeam Network
- Website: washingtonwildthings.com

The Washington Wild Things are a professional baseball team based in Washington, Pennsylvania. The Wild Things compete in the National Association of Professional Baseball (NAPB) as a member of the Central Division in the Midwest Conference. The team is owned by Stu and Francine Williams, and initially played its home games at the Thurman Munson Memorial Stadium in Canton, Ohio, before moving to EQT Park in Washington, Pennsylvania, in 2002.

The franchise was founded in 1997 as an expansion team as the Canton Crocodiles, and have won their only Frontier Cup in history during their inaugural season. They have the most playoff appearances in all Frontier League teams, with 15 since their founding, including nine division championships.

== Season-by-season record ==
Canton Crocodiles (Frontier League)
Year	W–L	Win %	Place	Postseason
1997	45–35	.562	2nd in FL East	Frontier League Division Series: Defeated the Johnstown Steal 2–0.; Frontier League Championship Series: Defeated the Evansville Otters 2–0.
1998	41–38	.519	2nd in FL East	Frontier League Division Series: Lost vs. Chillicothe Paints 2–1.
1999	33–51	.393	5th in FL East	Did not qualify
2000	38–46	.452	5th in FL East	Did not qualify
2001	47–37	.560	3rd in FL East	Frontier League Division Series: Lost vs. Chillicothe Paints 2–1.
Total	204–207	.496	—	
Playoffs	6–4	.600	—	3 Playoff appearances, 1 championship.
Washington Wild Things (Frontier League)
2002	56–28	.667	1st in FL East	Frontier League Division Series: Defeated the Kalamazoo Kings 2–0.; Frontier League Championship Series: Lost vs. Richmond Roosters 3–1.
2003	54–34	.614	2nd in FL East	Frontier League Division Series: Lost vs. Gateway Grizzlies 2–0.
2004	62–34	.646	1st in FL East	Frontier League Division Series: Lost vs. Evansville Otters 3–0.
2005	63–32	.663	1st in FL East	Frontier League Division Series: Lost vs. Chillicothe Paints 3–2.
2006	59–37	.615	1st in FL East	Frontier League Division Series: Lost vs. Chillicothe Paints 3–1.
2007	55–40	.579	1st in FL East	Frontier League Division Series: Defeated the Gateway Grizzlies 3–0.; Frontier League Championship Series: Lost vs. Windy City ThunderBolts 3–2.
2008	48–48	.500	3rd in FL East	Did not qualify
2009	43–53	.448	4th in FL East	Did not qualify
2010	38–57	.400	5th in FL East	Did not qualify
2011	42–52	.447	5th in FL East	Did not qualify
2012	44–52	.458	6th in FL East	Did not qualify
2013	41–55	.427	6th in FL East	Did not qualify
2014	57–39	.593	3rd in FL East	Frontier League Playoffs: Defeated Evansville Otters in wildcard game. Lost in 2nd round to River City Rascals 2–0.
2015	42–54	.437	T-9th in FL	Did not qualify
2016	46–49	.484	6th in FL	Did not qualify
2017	53–43	.552	3rd in FL	Frontier League Playoffs: Lost in 1st round to Florence Freedom 3–1.
2018	54–42	.563	1st in FL East	Frontier League Division Series: Defeated the Evansville Otters 3–0.; Frontier League Championship Series: Lost vs. Joliet Slammers 3–2.
2019	37–59	.385	5th in FL	Did not qualify
2020	--	--	--	Season not played due to COVID-19
2021	56–40	.583	1st in FL	Frontier League Division Series: Defeated Equipe Quebec 3–2.; Frontier League Championship Series: Lost vs. Schaumburg Boomers 3–2
2022	62–34	.646	1st in FL West	Frontier League Division Series: Lost to Schaumburg Boomers 2–0.
2023	47–49	.490	4th in FL	Did not qualify
2024	67–28	.705	1st in FL West	Frontier League Division Series: Defeated Lake Erie Crushers 2–0. Frontier League Championship Series: Lost to Quebec Capitales 3–1.
2025	54–42	.563	1st in FL West	Lost Frontier League Division Wild Card Round to Gateway Grizzlies 2–0.
2026	66–35	.653	1st in FL West	Frontier League Wild Card Round: Defeated Florence Y'alls 2–1. Frontier League West Division Conference Finals: Lost to Evansville Otters 3–2.
Total	901–711	.541	—	
Playoffs	16–25	.390	—	10 Division titles, 14 Playoff appearances.

== Current roster ==
Washington Wild Things roster
Active roster	Coaching staff
Pitchers: -- Jacob Carroll; -- Ryan Chasse; -- Albert Cuello-Batista; -- Joelvis Del Rosario; -- Jordan DiValerio; -- Brent Francisco; -- Santiago Florez; -- Hector Garcia; -- Regi Grace; -- Jackson Hicks; 21 Zach Kirby; -- Jacob McCaskey; -- Nick McClanahan; -- Ivan Oviedo; -- Marlon Perez; -- Tyler Wehrle; Catchers: -- Willie Estrada; -- Jommer Hernandez; Infielders: -- Tommy Caufield; -- Andrew Czech; -- Sammy Infante; -- Tyreque Reed; -- Ethan Wilder; Outfielders: -- Jake DeLeo; -- Wagner Lagrange; -- Jeff Liquori; -- Caleb McNeely; -- Brett Roberts	Manager: 7 Tom Vaeth; Coaches: -- Cole Bumbales (first base); -- Hector Nelo (pitching); Disabled list; ‡ Inactive list; § Suspended list; updated May 4, 2025 Transactions

== Highlights ==
- First ever perfect game in Frontier League history, (Matt Sergey, August 24, 2014)
- Frontier League Organization of the Year Award (2002, 2004, 2005)
- Second team in Frontier League history to make playoffs four straight years (Evansville, 1997–2000)
- Led Frontier League in wins four straight seasons
  - 2002 (56–28)
  - 2003 (54–34)
  - 2004 (62–34)
  - 2005 (63–32)
- In 2005:
  - 35–12 second half of season (Since July 18)
  - 23–5 the month of August
  - 13-game winning streak (July 27 – August 9)
  - 11-game winning streak (August 12 – 23)
  - 14 straight home wins (August 3 – 23)
- Hosted the Frontier League All-Star Game in 2005 and 2013

=== New Frontier League records up to 2005 ===
- Only perfect game in Frontier League history (August 24, 2014, thrown by Matt Sergey)
- Wins in a season: 63 (old record – Washington Wild Things, 2004)
- Triples: 46 (old record – 33; Springfield, 1999)
- Runs: 645 (old record – 612; London, 1999)
- At Bats: 3,357 (old record – 3329; Rockford, 2004)
- Hits: 999 (old record – 962; Rockford, 2004)
- RBI: 567 (old record – 550; London, 1999)
- Base on Balls: 433 (old record – 427; Dubois County, 2002)
- Saves: 34 (old record – Washington Wild Things, 2004)
- Total chances: 3740 (old record – 3,687; S/O 2004)
- Individual saves by a closer, Jonathan Kountis

== Managers ==
- 2002–2003: Jeff Isom (110–62)
- 2004–2007: John Massarelli (239–143)
- 2008: Greg Jelks (48–48)
- 2009: Mark Mason (43–53)
- 2010–2011: Darin Everson (80–110)
- 2012: Chris Bando (44–52)
- 2013–2014: Bart Zeller (72–74)
- 2014–2015: Bob Bozzuto: (76–64)
- 2016–2020: Gregg Langbehn: (190–193)
- 2021– : Tom Vaeth: (238–154)

Following the 2003 season, Jeff Isom resigned as manager and moved to the Joliet Jackhammers of the Northern League. After the 2007 season, Massarelli and the Wild Things parted ways. He took 2008 off and was named the first manager in Lake Erie Crushers history. In 2008, Greg Jelks was named the new manager of the Wild Things, but failed to lead them to the playoffs and finished the season at 48–48.

Mark Mason returned to the Wild Things in 2009 as manager after coaching the Paints for two seasons. In November 2009, Mason left the Wild Things to become pitching coach of the Atlantic League's York Revolution. On February 16, 2010, they announced Darin Everson as their new manager. After the 2011 season, Darin Everson and the Wild Things parted ways following an 80–110 record over two seasons. On October 18, 2011, the Wild Things hired former MLB catcher and Triple-A coach Chris Bando as the 6th manager in Wild things history. In March 2013, Bando announced that due to complications from hip surgery in January he would resign as manager. Recently hired Bench coach Bart Zeller, who had managed the Joliet Slammers the last two seasons and won a championship, was promoted to manager. During the 2014 season at 31–19 headed into the All-Star break, manager Bart Zeller resigned due to health concerns. He was scheduled to manage the Eastern All-Stars. After the break, Bob Bozzuto took over as manager.

== Notable alumni ==
- Kalen DeBoer (1998)
- Vidal Nuño (2011)
- Chris Smith (2011–2012)
- Zac Grotz (2016)
- Pat McAfee (2018)
- James Meeker (2018–2021)
- Chris Kwitzer (2020)
- Rob Whalen (2021–2022)
- Isaac Mattson (2022)
- Alex Carrillo (2024)
- Brandon McIlwain (2024)

== Championships and awards ==
- 2002 Frontier League Eastern Division Champions
- 2002 Frontier League Organization of the Year
- 2002 Jared Howton, Most Valuable Pitcher
- 2002 Jeff Isom, Manager Of the Year
- 2003 Josh Loggins, Most Valuable Player
- 2004 Frontier League Eastern Division Champions
- 2004 Frontier League Organization of the Year
- 2004 John Massarelli, Manager Of the Year
- 2005 Frontier League Eastern Division Champions
- 2005 Frontier League Organization of the Year
- 2006 Frontier League Eastern Division Champions
- 2006 John Massarelli, Manager Of the Year
- 2007 Frontier League Eastern Division Champions
- 2018 Frontier League Eastern Division Champions
- 2021 Frontier League Eastern Division Champions
- 2022 Frontier League West Division Champions
- 2024 Frontier League West Division Champions
- 2024 Caleb McNeely, Most Valuable Player
