= Evansville Otters =

Frontier League baseball team in Evansville, Indiana

- Founded in 1993 in Lancaster, Ohio; Based in Evansville, Indiana since 1995
Team logo
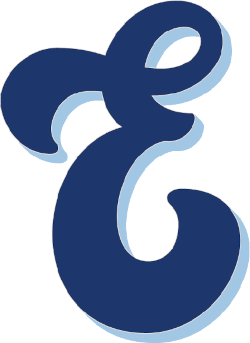
Cap insignia

Minor league affiliations
- Class: Independent (1993–present)
- League: National Association of Professional Baseball (1993–present)
- Conference: Midwest Conference
- Division: Central Division

Minor league titles
- League titles (2): 2006; 2016
- Division titles (3): 1997; 2000; 2019

Team data
- Name: Evansville Otters (1995–present)
- Previous names: Lancaster Scouts (1993–1994)
- Colors: Dark blue, red, white, light blue, dark brown, light brown, off-white
- Ballpark: Bosse Field (1995–present)
- Previous parks: Beavers Field (1993–1994)
- Owner/ Operator: Wilfred “Bill” Bussing III
- General manager: Brycen Moore
- Manager: Andy McCauley
- Media: Evansville Courier & Press
- Website: evansvilleotters.com

The Evansville Otters are a professional baseball team based in Evansville, Indiana. They compete in the National Association of Professional Baseball (NAPB) as a member of the Central Division. Since their relocation from Lancaster, Ohio in 1995, the Otters have played at Bosse Field, which originally opened in 1915. The Otters are the oldest current team in the Frontier League and have reached the postseason fourteen times, winning Frontier League championships in 2006 and 2016.

== History ==
The Otters franchise history began with the Lancaster Scouts, a founding member of the Frontier League in 1993. After their second year playing in Lancaster, Ohio, and drawing a league-low 261 fans a game, the franchise relocated to Evansville, Indiana and renamed themselves the Otters. The name was chosen via a Name the Team contest, with Otters beating out Pioneers, River Pilots, and Wolves. Otters were extirpated from Southern Indiana in the late 19th century, but one had recently been spotted in the region and the Indiana Department of Natural Resources was working to re-introduce them.

When the Otters began play in 1995, they returned professional baseball to Evansville for the first time in a decade. The city had been without a team since the Evansville Triplets of the American Association relocated to Nashville, Tennessee following the 1984 season.

The Otters named Boots Day their manager in December 1994. Day was a former Evansville Triplet and had previously managed for the Bristol Tigers of the Appalachian League from 1982 to 1983.

The Otters drew 90,943 fans in their first season, more than the entire Frontier League had in its inaugural season two years earlier. Their 2,675 fans a game was third among all independent baseball teams in 1995, behind only the St. Paul Saints, Winnipeg Goldeyes, and Sioux City Explorers. The Otters' general manager, Jim Miller, was awarded the Frontier League's 1995 Executive of the Year award.

The first Evansville Otters game was played on June 15, 1995. The Otters were awarded the Frontier League Organization of the Year Award in 1997, and the Commissioner's Award of Excellence in 2004. They earned their 689th win, a league record, on August 18, 2011. The team hosted the largest crowd ever at Bosse Field on July 24, 2013, with 8,253 fans in attendance. The Otters welcomed their 2,000,000th fan to the ballpark on August 18, 2013.

Over 50 Otters players have had their contracts purchased by Major League Baseball franchises. Four Otters have gone on to careers at the major league level including George Sherrill, Andrew Werner, Brandyn Sittinger, and Randy Wynne.

The success of the Otters in Evansville led to the move of more Frontier League teams to larger cities, many of which have built new ballparks, leading to the increased stability and success of the league in recent years.

On May 27, 2014, the Otters became the first team in the Frontier League to reach 800 wins.

The Otters reached the Frontier League Championship Series in 2023 for the first time since 2016 but lost in five games to the Quebec Capitales.

They reached the championship again in 2026, but lost to the Ottawa Titans.

== Ballpark ==
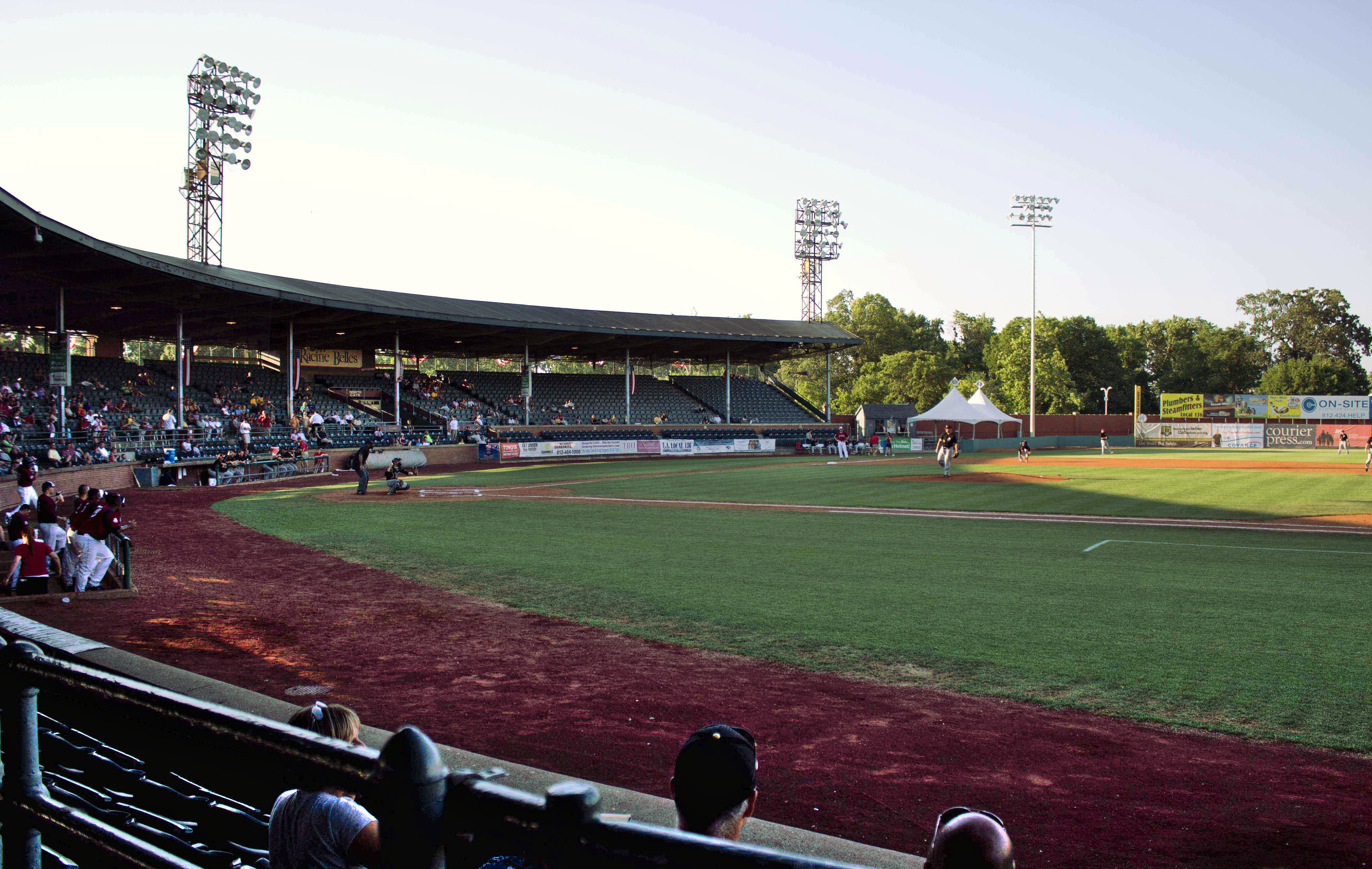
Bosse Field in 2012

The Evansville Otters have played their home games at Bosse Field since they moved to Evansville in 1995. It was built in 1915 and is the third oldest ballpark still in use by a professional team, trailing Fenway Park and Wrigley Field.

== Season-by-season records ==
Year	Division	W–L	Win %	Place	Postseason	Source
Lancaster Scouts
1993	West	22–33	.400	3rd	Did not qualify	
1994	West	25–39	.391	2nd	Won 1st Round Playoff vs. Chillicothe Paints 2–1. Lost Frontier League Championship vs. Erie Sailors 2–0.	
Total	—	47–72	.395	—	—	
Playoffs	—	2–3	—	.400	1 Playoff appearance, 0 Championships	
Evansville Otters
1995	—	31-38	.449	6th	Did not qualify	
1996	West	34–40	.459	3rd	Did not qualify	
1997	West	46–33	.582	1st	Won 1st Round Playoff vs. Richmond Roosters 2–1. Lost Frontier League Championship vs. Canton Crocodiles 2–0.	
1998	West	43–36	.544	3rd	Lost 1st Round Playoff vs. Springfield Capitals 2–1.	
1999	West	43–41	.512	1st	Lost 1st Round Playoff vs. Chillicothe Paints 2–0.	
2000	West	45–38	.616	2nd	Won 1st Round Playoff vs. River City Rascals 2–0. Lost Frontier League Championship vs. Johnstown Johnnies 3–1.	
2001	West	44–40	.524	4th	Did not qualify	
2002	West	33–51	.393	6th	Did not qualify	
2003	East	51–37	.580	3rd	Won 1st Round Playoff vs. Chillicothe Paints 2–1. Lost Frontier League Championship vs. Gateway Grizzlies 3–0.	
2004	East	54–42	.562	2nd	Won 1st Round Playoff vs. Washington Wild Things 3–0. Lost Frontier League Championship vs. Rockford Riverhawks 3–0.	
2005	East	52–43	.547	4th	Did not qualify	
2006	West	46–50	.479	2nd	Won 1st Round Playoff vs. Rockford Riverhawks 3–2. Won Frontier League Championship vs. Chillicothe Paints 3–0.	
2007	West	34–62	.354	4th	Did not qualify	
2008	West	39–57	.406	6th	Did not qualify	
2009	West	28–66	.298	6th	Did not qualify	
2010	West	35–59	.372	6th	Did not qualify	
2011	West	39–57	.406	T-5th	Did not qualify	
2012	East	45–50	.474	5th	Did not qualify	
2013	East	51–45	.531	4th	Did not qualify	
2014	East	57–37	.606	2nd	Lost East Division Wild Card Game vs. Washington Wild Things.	
2015	East	48–48	.500	4th	Did not qualify	
2016	West	55–40	.579	2nd	Won 1st Round Playoff vs. Joliet Slammers 3–1. Won Frontier League Championship vs. River City Rascals 3–2.	
2017	West	52–44	.542	2nd	Lost 1st Round Playoff vs. Schaumburg Boomers 3–1.	
2018	West	51–45	.531	2nd	Lost 1st Round Playoff vs. Washington Wild Things 3–0.	
2019	West	57–39	.531	T-1st	Lost 1st Round Playoff vs. River City Rascals 3–0.	
2020	West	-	-	-	Season not played due to COVID-19	
2021	West	57–39	.594	2nd	Did not qualify	
2022	West	52–44	.542	3rd	Lost Wild Card Game to Schaumburg Boomers 5–1.	
2023	West	52–44	.542	3rd	Won Wild Card Game over Schaumburg Boomers 4–3; Won 1st Round Playoff over Gateway Grizzlies 2–1; Lost Championship vs. Québec Capitales 3–2	
2024	West	41–55	.427	6th	Did not qualify	
2025	Central	40–56	.417	4th	Did not qualify	
2026	West	62–40	.608	2nd	Won Wild Card Round over Schaumburg Boomers 2–1; Won West Division Conference Finals over Washington Wild Things 3–2; Lost Championship to Ottawa Titans 3–1	
Total	—	1,360–1,377	.504	—	—	
Playoffs	—	24–28	.462	—	15 Playoff appearances, 2 Championships	

== Current roster ==
Evansville Otters roster
Active (24-man) roster		Coaching staff
Pitchers: -- CJ Backer; 18 Jon Beymer; 13 Parker Brahms; 27 Casey Delgado; -- Tyler Driver; -- Ben Gerl; -- Rolando Gutierrez; 46 Grif Hughes; 9 Chip Korbacher; -- Terance Marin; -- Adrian Montilva ‡; 36 Tyler Ras; 33 Braden Scott; 24 Zach Smith; 31 Alex Valdez; -- Zach Voelker; 50 Ryan Wiltse; -- Nate Wohlgemuth	Catchers: 8 Logan Brown ‡; 5 Justin Felix; -- Duncan Hewitt; -- Cohen Wilbanks; Infielders: -- George Callil; -- Alain Camou; 28 J.J. Cruz; -- Riley Delgado ‡; -- Ray Gil; 34 David Mendham; 11 Pavin Parks; -- Keenan Taylor; Outfielders: -- Graham Brown; -- Ty Crittenberger; 19 Clayton Keyes; 2 Mason White	Manager: -- Andy McCauley; Coaches: -- Phil Britton (assistant); -- Dylan Dando (assistant hitting); -- Billy Easley (assistant); -- Max Peterson (pitching); -- Bobby Segal (hitting); -- Rob Watson (assistant); Disabled list; ‡ Inactive list; § Suspended list; updated May 27, 2025 Transactions

== Notable alumni ==
- George Sherrill (1999–2000)
- Andrew Werner (2009–2010)
- Brett Marshall (2015)
- Ty Hensley (2018)
- Randy Wynne (2018–2019)
- Brandyn Sittinger (2019)
- Boots Day (2021)

== See also ==
- Sports in Evansville
