= Kentucky Rifles =

- 1993–1994; Paintsville, Kentucky; Pikeville, Kentucky

Minor league affiliations
- Class: Independent (1993–1994)
- League: Frontier League (1993–1994)
- Division: Southern Division (1994); Eastern Division (1993)

Minor league titles
- Division titles (1): 1993

Team data
- Name: Kentucky Rifles (1993–1994)
- Colors: Royal blue, black, white
- Ballpark: Central Park (Paintsville); Pikeville Athletic Field (Pikeville)

The Kentucky Rifles were a professional minor league baseball team located in southeastern Kentucky, United States, playing in the independent Frontier League from 1993 to 1994. The team split their home games between Central Park in Paintsville and Pikeville Athletic Field in Pikeville. After the 1994 season, the team moved to Richmond, Indiana and became the Richmond Roosters.

== Seasons ==
Kentucky Rifles
Year	W-L	PCT	Place	Postseason
1993	27-23	.540	1st in Eastern Division	no postseason
1994	24-41	.369	4th in Southern Division	
Totals	51-64	.443		
