= Québec Capitales =

Frontier League baseball team in Quebec, Canada

- Logo

Information
- League: National Association of Professional Baseball (2020–present) (North Division)
- Location: Quebec City, Quebec
- Ballpark: Stade Canac
- Founded: 1999
- Nickname: Caps
- League championships: (11) 2006, 2009, 2010, 2011, 2012, 2013, 2017, 2022, 2023, 2024, 2025
- Division championships: (9) 2002, 2004, 2005, 2017, 2022, 2023, 2024, 2025, 2026
- Playoff berths: 21 2000 2002 2003 2004 2005 2006 2008 2009 2010 2011 2012 2013 2015 2016 2017 2018 2022 2023 2024 2025 2026
- Former league: Northern League (1999–2002) Northeast League (2003–2004) Can-Am League (2005–2019)
- Colours: Navy blue, gold, white
- Mascot: Capi the Lion
- Retired numbers: 18, 31, 34
- Ownership: Jean Tremblay, Pierre Tremblay, Marie-Pierre Simard
- President: Charles Demers
- General manager: Mike Petillion
- Manager: Patrick Scalabrini
- Media: Le Journal de Québec; Le Soleil; RDS; TVA Sports; CHYZ 94,3; HomeTeam Network
- Website: capitalesdequebec.com

The Québec Capitales (French: Capitales de Québec and often referred to as the Caps) are a professional baseball team based in Quebec City. The Capitales compete in the National Association of Professional Baseball (NAPB) as a member of the North Division in the Atlantic Conference. The club is owned by Jean Tremblay, Pierre Tremblay, and Marie-Pierre Simard, an ownership group that owns several professional sports teams in the city, while the team's broadcasting rights are split between CHYZ-FM and HomeTeam Network.

The club began play in 1999 after Miles Wolff Jr. purchased the Bangor Blue Ox and relocated them to Quebec City, where they initially played in the Northern League, but then moved to the Northeast League in 2003 and the Can-Am League in 2005, and the Frontier League prior to the 2020 season. Since 1999, the Capitales play at Stade Canac, which was formerly known as Stade Municipal.

Québec has won the most championships in all independent baseball teams, with a total of ten championships since its existence, and have made the playoffs 20 times. The club is known as one of the most popular independent baseball teams in North America, and have been extremely successful from 2009 to 2013 with five league championships in a row. These successes were followed by an extended championship drought, which at 4 seasons, is the longest in franchise history. The Capitales have rivalries with the New Jersey Jackals, New York Boulders, the Ottawa Titans and the Trois-Rivières Aigles.

Several individuals who hold an association with the club have been inducted into the Baseball Hall of Fame. Six players have had their numbers retired by the Capitales, including the first in independent baseball history.

== History ==
In 1998, Miles Wolff Jr. purchased the Bangor Blue Ox, relocated the team to Quebec City and renamed them the Québec Capitales. They played their inaugural home opener on June 4, 1999 in front of a crowd of 4,743. In their first season in Quebec City, the club has averaged 2,697 fans per game for a total of 110,559 in 41 home games. They then moved to the Northeast League in 2003, followed by the Can-Am League in 2005.

In 2006, the Capitales won their first championship in team history. Although the team had the second-worst record in team history, they still qualified for last postseason spot with a 44–44 record. They defeated the top seed North Shore Spirit in dramatic comeback fashion winning the last two games to win the series 3 games to 2 in the semifinal round. In the championship series, the Caps took a 2 games to none advantage before the Brockton Rox came back to even the series. In the final and decisive game, Québec defeated the Rox on their home field by coming from behind and won by a score of 5–4 to win the Can-Am League Championship 3 games to 2. The team has averaged 3,295 fans per game in 42 home games.

On June 13, 2009, a stadium record crowd of 5,354 invaded the Stade Municipal de Québec as former Major League Baseball pitcher Éric Gagné, was the starting pitcher in his first game in a Capitales uniform. At the end of the season, the Caps won the second half regular-season championship and finished the season with the 3rd best overall record (53–41). Québec eliminated the Brockton Rox 3 games to 1 in the opening round. In a rematch of the 2005 championship, the Capitales got revenge by eliminating the Worcester Tornadoes 3 games to 1. They were ranked first in the 2009 Can-Am League attendance figures, by averaging 3,565 fans per game to a total of 164,009 in 46 home games. It was also their highest average attendance in franchise history.

In 2010, the Caps obtained a second consecutive championship, passing by the Pittsfield Colonials 3 games to 1.

In 2011, Québec won their third championship in a row by defeating the New Jersey Jackals in five games.

In 2012, the team again defeated the Jackals 4 games to 1, thus winning their fourth championship in a row. A fifth championship in a row materialized in 2013, the Capitales defeated again the New Jersey Jackals in seven games.

In 2017, the Caps finished first place in the Can-Am League regular season standings, and captured their seventh championship in franchise history. They swept the Rockland Boulders 3 games to 0 at home in front of a crowd of 4,607 during Game 3 on September 14, 2017. During the regular season, the team attracted 141,923 people in its stadium, to an average of 2,838 fans per game.

In 2020, Québec moved to the Frontier League following the merger of the Can-Am League with the FL. However, due to the COVID-19 pandemic and extended closure of the Canada–United States border, the league announced that the Capitales (along with the Trois-Rivières Aigles) would be unable to compete for the 2020 season (which was later cancelled). The club later announced they intended to organize a separate league in the province of Quebec for the summer as an alternative, but these plans were eventually scrapped by both clubs.

The continued closure of the Canada–United States border, unfortunately resulted in pushing the Caps' first game in the FL to the 2022 season. Ottawa, Québec, and Trois-Rivières were replaced on the 2021 schedule by a travelling team named Équipe Québec. Équipe Québec used the Canadian players from the Ottawa Titans, Québec Capitales and Trois-Rivières Aigles to craft the base of their roster and spent the first half of the season on the road, before returning to Canada in late July. Équipe Québec split their home games between Stade Canac in Quebec City and Stade Quillorama in Trois-Rivières.

On July 30, 2021, Équipe Québec hosted the New York Boulders at Stade Canac and won the game 10–8 in front of a full house of 2,800 people, the maximum number that was allowed due to the Government of Quebec's public health restrictions.

On September 12, 2021, Équipe Québec qualified for the playoffs, and then faced the Washington Wild Things in the best-of-five Frontier League Division Series (FLDS). The capacity crowd of 4,287 gathered at Stade Canac during Game 3 represented nearly 1,500 more people than the number allowed due to public health restrictions, and Québec were able to pull a 3–2 win over the Wild Things. They however lost Game 4 and 5 at home, which made an end to their very unique season. Équipe Québec finished the season first place in the Atlantic Division with a record of 52 wins and 44 losses with an average of 2,198 fans in 24 home games, including the playoffs. A full reset was done by the team's front office to immediately shift focus on the 2022 season.

On September 18, 2022, the Caps won their 8th championship in franchise history, defeating the Schaumburg Boomers in the Frontier League Championship Series (FLCS) in four games. Team catcher Ruben Castro hit a walk-off sacrifice fly to win the championship in the bottom of the 9th inning, with a final score of 2–1. Noise levels in the stadium allegedly reached as high as 115 decibels when runs were scored by the Capitales, but most notably, when Ruben Castro hit a walk-off 2-run double in the bottom of the 9th inning the previous night during Game 3, when 4,428 fans were crammed into the stadium. In the regular season, the team has averaged 2,557 fans per game to a total of 130,414 in 51 home games.

On September 17, 2023, Québec won their 9th championship in franchise history over the Evansville Otters. The 2023 season was also notable for the Capitales for drawing 166,916 people to its ballpark for an average of 3,035 fans per game, the highest total attendance in franchise history.

In the 2024 season, the Caps won another division title and made it to the finals for the third consecutive year. They’ve sold out 21 of their 48 home games, and have set a franchise record for the most consecutive sellouts, with 16 in a row. They have also averaged 3,436 fans per game during the regular season, their highest average attendance since 2009. On September 14, 2024, all 4,297 seats were sold in 45 minutes for the fans to watch Game 4 of the FLCS against the Washington Wild Things at home, as Québec were leading 2–1 in the series. The Capitales won their 10th championship in history and third in a row, by defeating the Wild Things in dramatic fashion, as Anthony Quirion hit walk-off grand slam in the bottom of the 9th inning. Team president Michel Laplante stated that it was the stadium's loudest moment in history, reaching deafening decibel levels after the win.

The Capitales won the championship again in 2025 over the Schaumburg Boomers after being down 2-1 in the series.

== Team culture ==
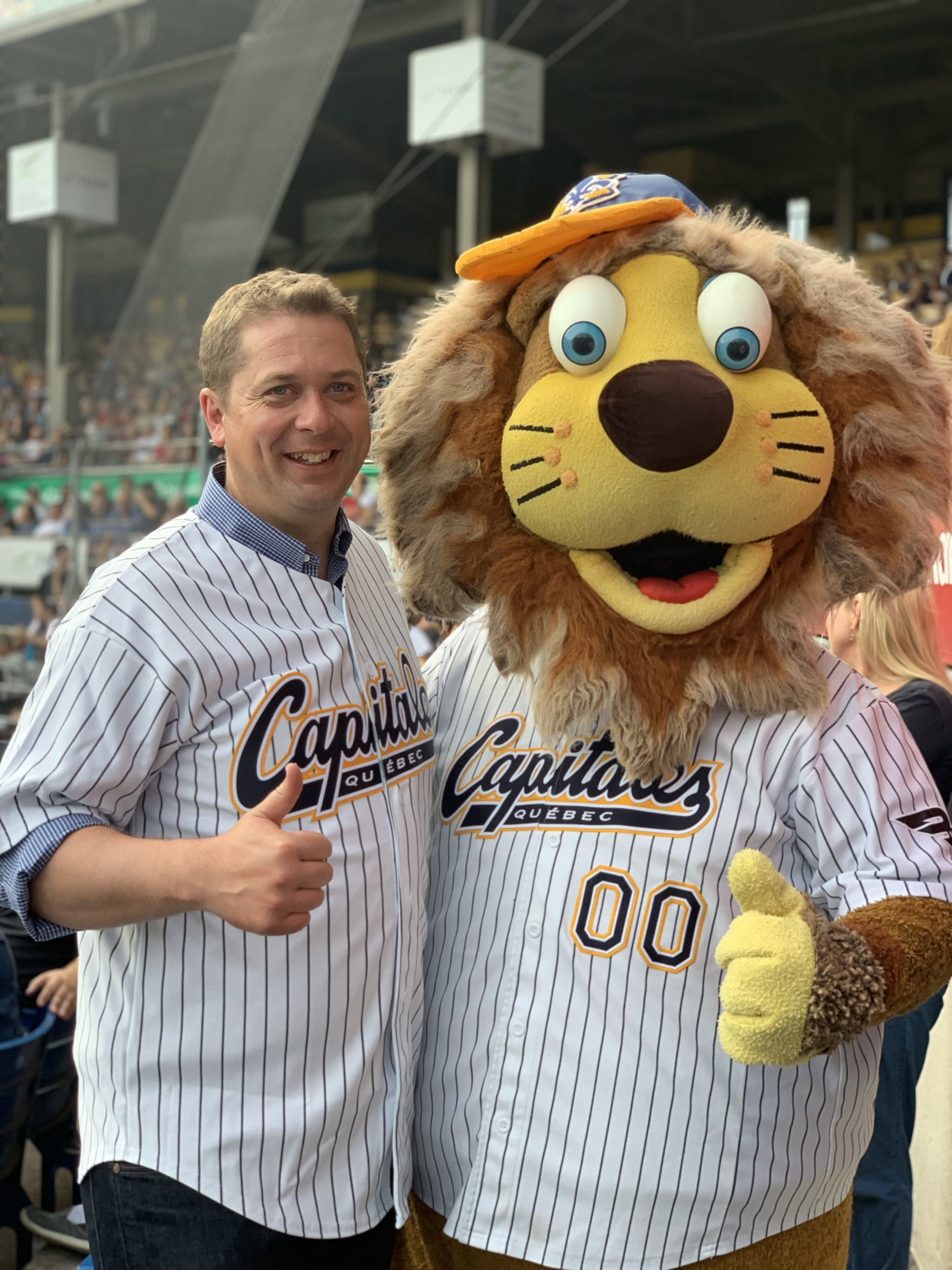
Canadian politician Andrew Scheer with Capitales mascot, Capi

=== Team identity ===
The official colours of the Québec Capitales are navy blue, gold and white. The primary logo consists of a white baseball diamond with navy blue pinstripes. The "Capitales" wordmark is superimposed over the diamond in navy blue outlined in gold. The wordmark is underlined by a navy blue ribbon with the word "Québec" centred on it in white, with the French word "de" centred in between. A navy blue fleur-de-lis is centred above the wordmark, with a stylized depiction of home plate centred below.

The Caps uniforms are traditional in design. The caps are navy blue throughout with the scripted "Q" cap logo centred on the front in gold with a white centre incorporating a navy blue fleur-de-lis and red baseball threading. The home jerseys are white with navy blue pinstripes, with the "Capitales" cursive script wordmark centred across in navy blue with gold outline. The alternate jersey is navy blue with gold piping with the cap logo centred on the left-side chest.

=== Fan base ===
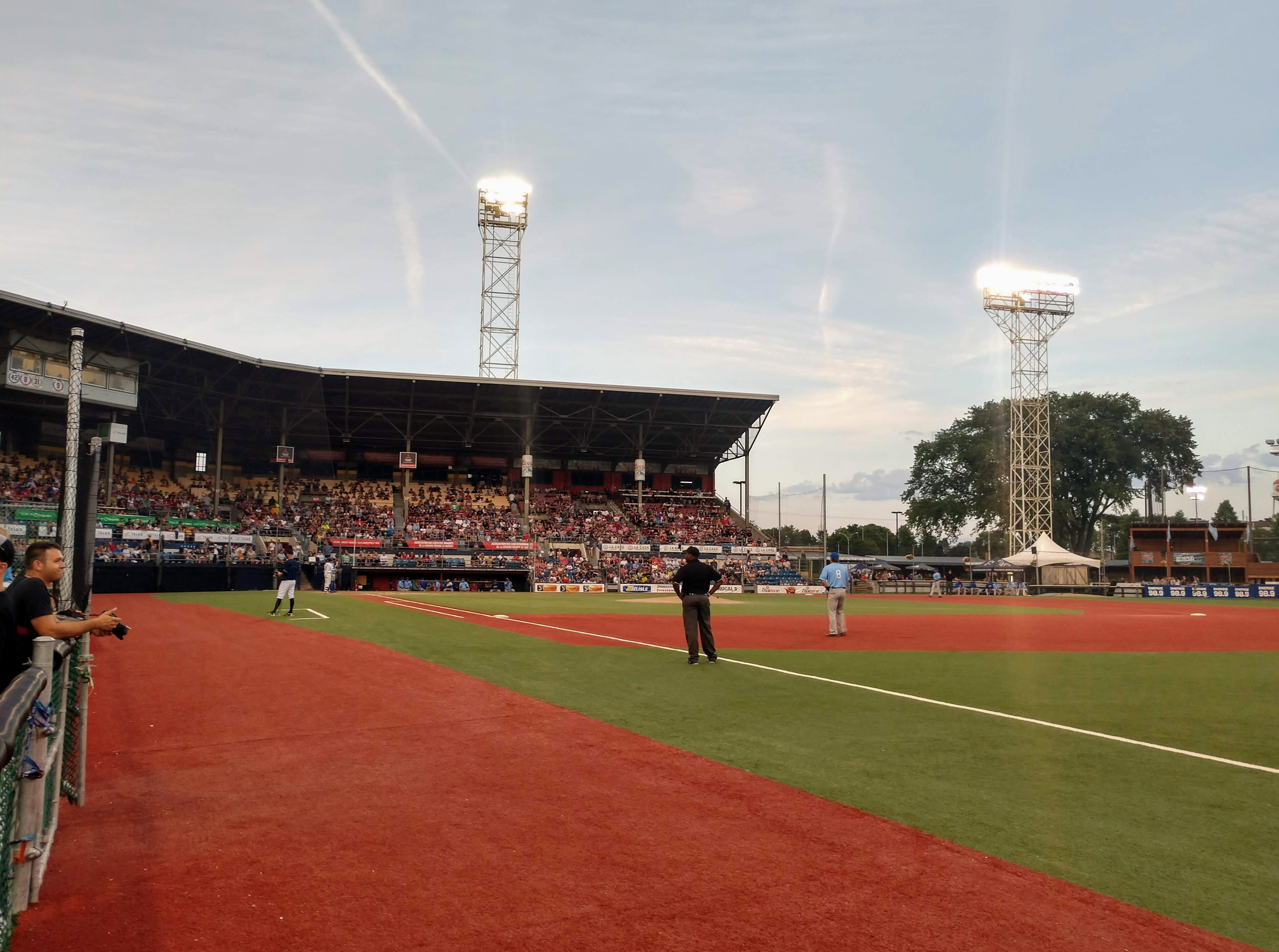
A sold-out Stade Canac during a Capitales home game

The price of a Capitales home game ticket is the lowest amongst any team in the FL. Stade Canac holds 4,297 seats for Caps games, with 3,500 reserved for season ticket holders. Because of the demand for season tickets, their sale is limited to the 2,300 people on the waiting list. As of August 2024, Caps' season tickets saw a renewal rate of 99.5 percent, a rate that would require more than 250 years to clear the existing waiting list. As of 2025, the Caps came first in ticket affordability in the league.

The Capitales are considered to have one of the loudest and largest fan bases in the FL.

Despite their loyalty, there have been several instances where the fanbase voiced their displeasure with the club. In the 2019 season, fans threw Caps jerseys onto the field to show their disapproval of the team's poor performances during the 2019 season, when they were ranked last in the Can-Am League for the entire season. Similarly, during the early season of the 2019, which overlaps with the playoffs of the Quebec Major Junior Hockey League's Quebec Remparts, fans were heard sarcastically chanting "Let's go Remparts!" and clapping alongside the chant as a sign of their farcical shift in priority from an under-performing team to the more successful playoff-bound 2019 Quebec Remparts season.

In addition to Quebec City, many fans live throughout the province of Quebec and Ontario, including the Ottawa Valley and Gatineau, Greater Montreal, and the Mauricie. As a result, Caps' away games at the Ottawa Stadium in Ottawa, and Stade Quillorama in Trois-Rivières host a more shared crowd. This is due in part to the Caps fans in those areas, and those cities' proximity to the Quebec City metropolitan area.

=== Rivalries ===
During their 25 years of existence, the Capitales have had several rivalries with some Can-Am and Frontier League franchises during the regular season, and continuing into the playoffs. Today, the Capitales have some intense rivalries with the New Jersey Jackals, New York Boulders, and the Ottawa Titans. In addition to the aforementioned teams, the Capitales have also developed a rivalry with the Trois-Rivières Aigles, as well as a minor geographic rivalry with the Ottawa Rapidz in 2008.

==== New Jersey Jackals ====
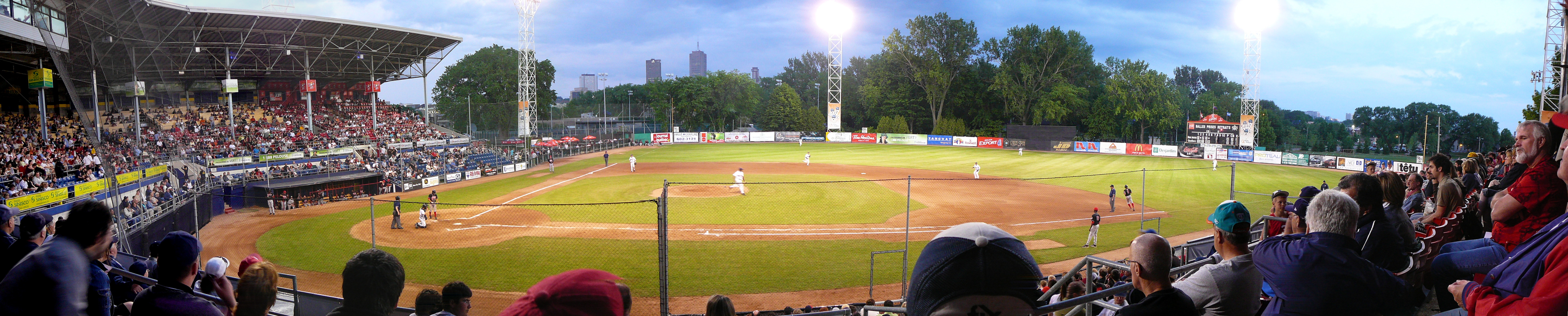
Capitales home game against the Jackals in 2013

Both teams are started operations in 1999. The Capitales played their first playoff series against the Jackals in 2010, winning the series 3–0. From 2010 to 2023, the two teams played in six postseason series against one another, including three Can-Am League championship series.

The rivalry has since been renewed from the 2023 Frontier League playoffs, which saw the Capitales rally from a 3–1 third-inning deficit to defeat the Jackals, 15–4, and advance to the Frontier League Championship Series.

==== Ottawa Titans ====
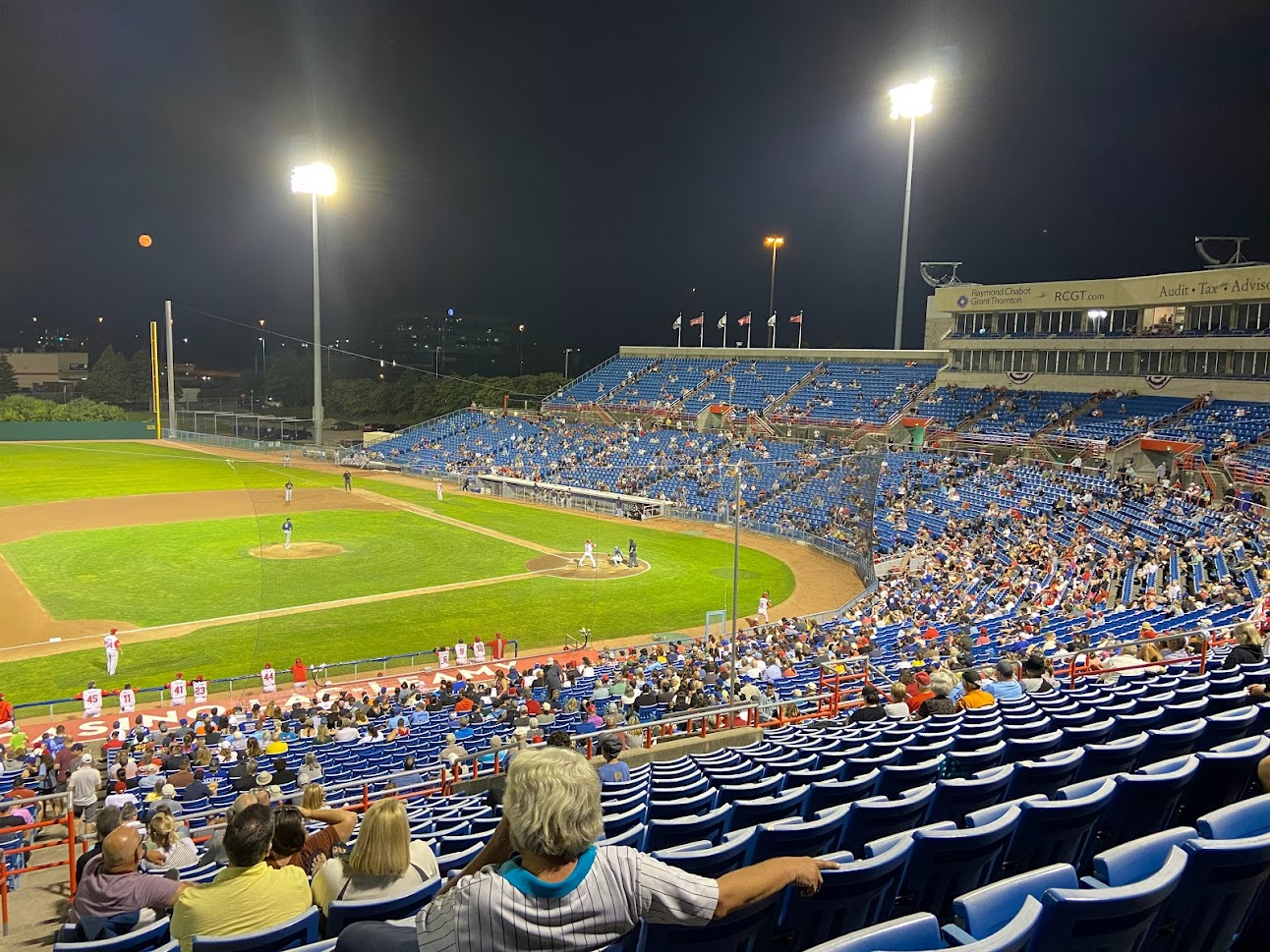
A game between the Titans and Capitales in September 2022

The rivalry between the Ottawa Titans and the Capitales is the fiercest in the FL, featuring two clubs that were active since the last Can-Am League expansion in 2015, when the Titans were formerly known as the Ottawa Champions. Since 2022, the rivalry was an embodiment of a larger culture war between English Canada and French Canada. The Titans have won 49 games over Québec, while the Capitales have won 76 games against Ottawa, respectively.

The rivalry started in 2015 when the Ottawa Champions were introduced in the Can-Am League as an expansion team. Both teams played for five seasons against each other, with eight series of three to four games per season. After the 2019 season, the Can-Am League merged with the Frontier League. The Champions were not invited to take part, but it was not immediately clear if they would fold or go on hiatus as former Champions' owner Miles Wolff, looked to sell the team. He could not find a buyer, and the club remained inactive for 11 months. In September 2020, the FL decided to expand to Ottawa, and an ownership group led by Sam Katz and the Ottawa Sports and Entertainment Group, finally bought the team and renamed it to the Titans. The rivalry became intradivisional once again in 2022 when the Titans were introduced in the FL.

Both teams have already faced each other twice in a playoff series, in 2022 and 2024, with Québec defeating the Ottawa Titans 2 games to 1 in the FLDS, both times. Due in part to the number of Caps fans living in Ottawa and Gatineau, and in part to Ottawa's relative proximity to Quebec City and the province of Quebec, Capitales–Titans games at Ottawa Stadium in Ottawa typically hold a high amount of Caps fans.

==== Trois-Rivières Aigles ====
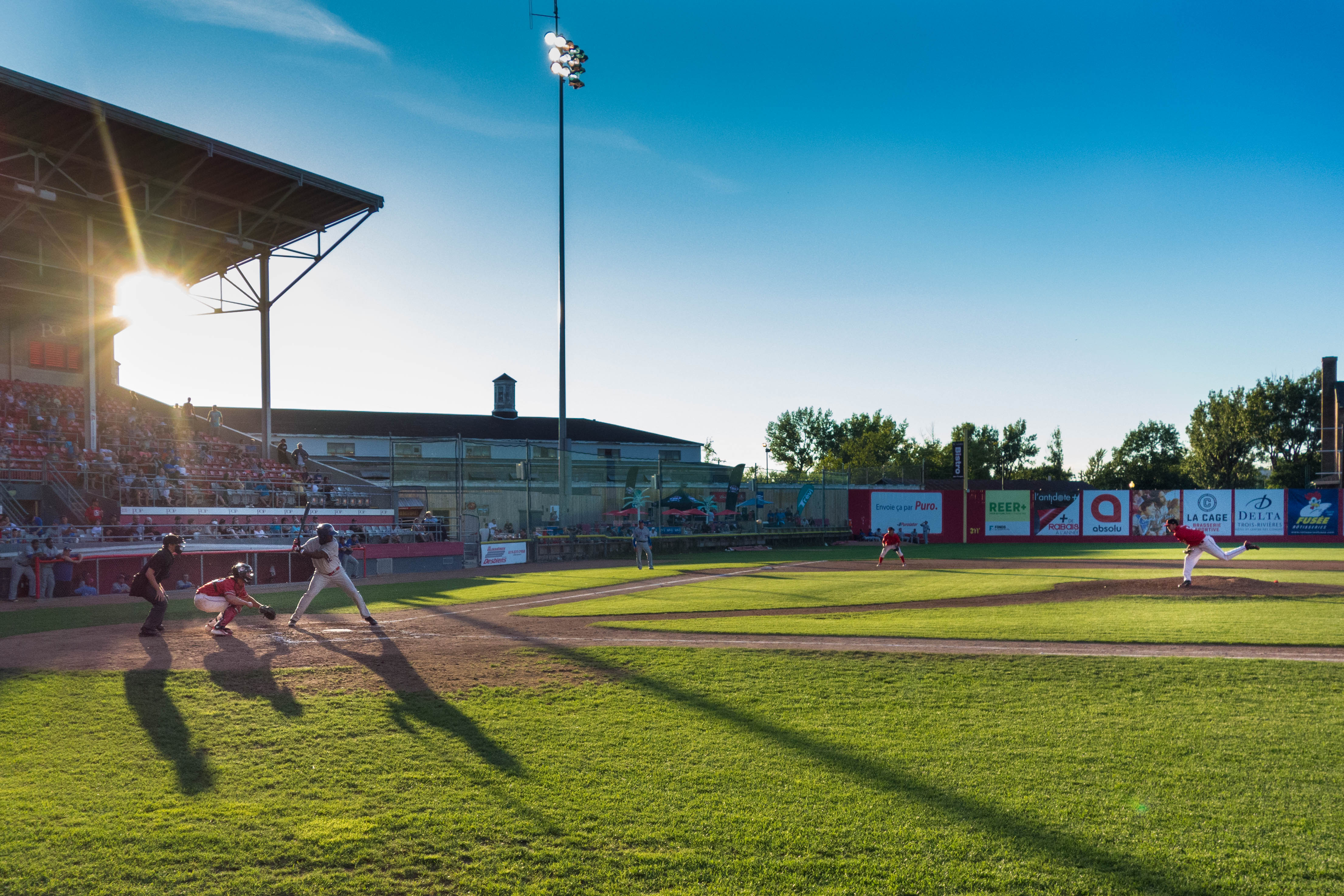
The Aigles hosting the Capitales at Stade Quillorama in Trois-Rivières in 2023.

The modern Trois-Rivières Aigles entered the Can-Am League in 2013, which sparkled a significant rivalry for the Capitales. The rivalry, also known as the Battle of Quebec, is mainly due to the 85-kilometre distance between the two home fields (Stade Canac and Stade Quillorama, respectively). They are the only two FL teams located in the province of Quebec. The teams compete in the same division and meet frequently during regular season games. The rivalry has been described as one of the FL's top rivalries. Due in part to the number of Caps fans living near or in Trois-Rivières, and in part to Trois-Rivières' relative proximity to Quebec City, Capitales–Aigles games at Stade Quillorama in Trois-Rivières typically hold at least 70 percent of Caps fans.

==== Ottawa Rapidz (2008) ====
The rivalry between the Ottawa Rapidz and the Québec Capitales was due to the 374-km distance between their home stadiums (Ottawa Baseball Stadium and Stade Municipal, respectively). During that time, the Rapidz were the Capitales closest team in distance, making them the fiercest rivals during that time.

== Season-by-season record ==
As of September 13, 2025

Season	League	Division	Regular season				Postseason
Season	League	Division	Wins	Losses	Win%	Finish	Postseason
1999	Northern	North	43	43	.500	3rd	did not qualify
2000	Northern	North	48	37	.565	2nd	Lost Opening round (Adirondack Lumberjacks) 3–1
2001	Northern	North	44	47	.484	2nd	did not qualify
2002	Northern	North	52	38	.578	1st	Lost Opening round (Adirondack Lumberjacks) 3–2
2003	Northeast	North	49	40	.551	3rd	Lost Opening round (North Shore Spirit) 3–0
2004	Northeast	North	58	34	.630	1st	Lost Opening round (North Shore Spirit) 3–2
2005	Can-Am	North	59	33	.552	1st	Won Opening round (Brockton Rox) 3–0; Lost Championship (Worcester Tornadoes) 3–0
2006	Can-Am	none	44	44	.500	1st	Won Opening round (North Shore Spirit) 3–2; Won Championship (Brockton Rox) 3–2
2007	Can-Am	none	49	45	.521	5th	did not qualify
2008	Can-Am	none	58	36	.617	1st	Won Opening round (Atlantic City Surf) 3-1; Lost Championship (Sussex Skyhawks) 3–0
2009	Can-Am	none	53	41	.563	3rd	Won Opening round (Brockton Rox) 3–1; Won Championship (Worcester Tornadoes) 3–1
2010	Can-Am	none	57	37	.606	1st	Won Opening round (New Jersey Jackals) 3–0; Won Championship (Pittsfield Colonials) 3–1
2011	Can-Am	none	64	26	.711	1st	Won Opening round (Brockton Rox) 3–0; Won Championship (New Jersey Jackals) 3-1
2012	Can-Am	none	66	34	.660	1st	Won Championship (New Jersey Jackals) 4–1
2013	Can-Am	none	56	42	.571	1st	Won Championship (New Jersey Jackals) 4–3
2014	Can-Am	none	46	50	.479	3rd	did not qualify
2015	Can-Am	none	54	42	.563	2nd	Lost Opening Round (New Jersey Jackals) 3–2
2016	Can-Am	none	56	44	.560	3rd	Lost Opening Round (Rockland Boulders) 3–2
2017	Can-Am	none	65	35	.650	1st	Won Opening Round (Sussex County Miners) 3–0; Won Championship (Rockland Boulders) 3–0
2018	Can-Am	none	58	44	.569	2nd	Won Opening Round (Rockland Boulders) 3–1; Lost Championship (Sussex County Miners) 3–1
2019	Can-Am	none	36	59	.379	6th	did not qualify
2020	Didn't play due to COVID-19	--	--	--	--	--	--
2021*	Did not play. See note	--	--	--	--	--	--
2022	Frontier	East	62	34	.646	1st	Won Divisional Round (Ottawa Titans) 2–1; Won Championship (Schaumburg Boomers) 3–1
2023	Frontier	East	60	35	.646	1st	Won Divisional Round (New Jersey Jackals) 3–0; Won Championship (Evansville Otters) 3–2
2024	Frontier	East	64	32	.667	1st	Won Divisional Round (Ottawa Titans) 2–1; Won Championship (Washington Wild Things) 3–1
2025	Frontier	East	67	29	.698	1st	Won Wild Card Round (New York Boulders) 2–0; Won Eastern Division Conference Finals (Tri-City Valley Cats) 3–1; Won Championship (Schaumburg Boomers) 3–2
2026	Frontier	East	69	32	.683	1st	Lost Wild Card Round (New York Boulders) 2–1

*In 2021, Équipe Québec, a combination of the Ottawa Titans, Québec Capitales and Trois-Rivières Aigles, played in the Frontier League. With a record of 52–44, they finished first place in the Atlantic Division, but lost the FLDS to the Washington Wild Things 3 games to 2.

== Current roster ==
Québec Capitales roster
Active roster	Coaching staff
Pitchers: -- Braeden Allemann; -- Ty Buckner; 51 Gilberto Chu; -- Brodie Cooper-Vassalakis; -- Harold Cortijo; -- Garrett Crowley; -- Franklin Parra; -- Pablo Garabitos; 2 Harley Gollert; -- Ryusuke Ito; -- Cleiverth Perez; -- Kevin Rodriguez; -- Cole Roland; -- Masatoshi Sakurai; Catchers: -- Arturo De Freitas; 27 Anthony Quirion; Infielders: -- Jarrod Belbin; -- Emile Boies; 11 Kyle Crowl; -- Cristian Inoa; -- Kenen Irizarry; -- Will Riley; -- Joshwan Wright; -- Jesmuel Valentín; Outfielders: -- Pier-Olivier Boucher; 43 Justin Gideon; 23 Marc-Antoine Lebreux	Manager: 5 Patrick Scalabrini; Coaches: 40 Christian Chénard (pitching); 33 Lachlan Fontaine (hitting); Disabled list; ‡ Inactive list; § Suspended list; updated April 30, 2025 Transactions

== Broadcasting and stadium entertainment ==
Capitales games can be heard on CHYZ-FM, and through the streaming platform HomeTeam Network with their play-by-play broadcasters Pierre Blais and Marc-André Lord. At many home games, the fans are entertained both outside and inside Stade Canac with myriad entertainers – live music, DJ music, giveaways and promotions. Between innings, the entertainment varies with on-field contests with their mascot Capi, youth games, t-shirt giveaways, promotions and many more. The team's public address announcer is Sébastien Dubois-Bergeron, and their stadium’s DJ is Daniel Sylvain, better known as “DJ Dan” as his stage name. DJ Dan brings 16 years of experience as the DJ of the Capitales, and he is also the DJ of the Quebec Remparts since 1999. He keeps the fans loud and entertained no matter what if the team win or loses. He works in collaboration with the press box crew, along with the team’s in-game host Yannick Tremblay, also known as “Pee-Wee”.

== Notable alumni ==
- Mitch Lyden (1999)
- José Núñez (2001)
- Darryl Motley (2002)
- Jeff Harris (2003–2004)
- Juan Melo (2004)
- Marty Janzen (2005)
- Éric Cyr (2006, 2008)
- Éric Gagné (2009)
- Pete Laforest (2009, 2010–2012)
- Andrew Albers (2010)
- Troy Cate (2010)
- Steve Green (2010)
- Max St. Pierre (2012)
- Jonathan Malo (2012–2019)
- Kalian Sams (2015–2018)
- Yordan Manduley (2015–2019, 2022)
- Jorge Reyes (2016)
- Yurisbel Gracial (2016–2017)
- Marcus Knecht (2016–2017)
- Jordan Lennerton (2016–2018)
- Matt Marksberry (2017)
- Lázaro Blanco (2017–2018)
- Josh Vitters (2018)
- Tyson Gillies (2019)
- Dustin Molleken (2019)
- Jonathan de Marte (2019)
- Scott Richmond (2019)
- Andrew Case (2021–2022)
- Gift Ngoepe (2021)
- Evan Rutckyj (2021, 2023)
- Jared Mortensen (2021)
- Tristan Pompey (2022)
- Greg Bird (2023)
- Jesmuel Valentín (2023–2024)
- Juremi Profar (2023–2024)
- Brandon Marklund (2024)

== See also ==
- List of baseball teams in Canada

Achievements
Preceded by Worcester Tornadoes; 2005	Can-Am League Champions; Québec Capitales; 2006	Succeeded by Nashua Pride; 2007
Preceded by Sussex Skyhawks; 2008	Can-Am League Champions; Québec Capitales; 2009	Current holder
