= CHYZ-FM =

College radio station of the Université Laval in Canada

Coordinates: 46°46′54″N 71°16′22″W

- Quebec City, Quebec; Canada
- Frequency: 94.3 MHz

Programming
- Format: campus radio

Ownership
- Owner: Université Laval; (Réseau Radio Campus Laval)

History
- First air date: 1997

Technical information
- Class: A
- ERP: 6 kW
- HAAT: 57.1 meters (187 ft)

Links
- Website: chyz.ca

CHYZ-FM is the college radio station for Université Laval, located in Sainte-Foy, Québec, Canada. Its frequency is 94.3 MHz on the FM dial.

Formerly known as Radio Campus Laval, CHYZ-FM broadcasts in French. The station is run by volunteers, most of whom are Laval students. Station programming follows mostly a music radio format of many music genres.

After it was founded in 1991, when student radio programs from various university faculties merged to form Radio Campus Laval, the station launched its programming on closed circuit and cable FM. When it began broadcasting on the FM band in 1997, it became known by its call letters CHYZ. In 2000, it started broadcasting via the Internet. Since October 2005, CHYZ has been broadcasting with a 6000-watt antenna from a site at the university and, as a result, can now be heard on the FM band throughout the Greater Quebec City Area.
