= Florence Y'alls =

Frontier League baseball team in Kentucky

- Founded in 1994 in Erie, Pennsylvania; Based in Florence, Kentucky since 2003

Team logo	Cap insignia

Minor league affiliations
- Class: Independent (1994–present)
- League: National Association of Professional Baseball (1994–present)
- Conference: Midwest Conference
- Division: Central Division

Minor league titles
- League titles (3): 1994; 1995; 2000
- Division titles (5): 1995; 1997; 2000; 2017; 2021
- Wild card berths (7): 1994; 1996; 1999; 2012; 2015; 2019; 2026

Team data
- Previous names: Erie Sailors (1994); Johnstown Steal (1995–1998); Johnstown Johnnies (1998–2002); Florence Freedom (2003–2019)
- Colors: Sky blue, classic red, cream white
- Mascot: Y'All Star
- Ballpark: Thomas More Stadium (2004–present)
- Previous parks: Ainsworth Field (1994); Point Stadium (1995–2002); Foundation Field (2003)
- Owner/ Operator: Freedom Baseball Club LLC
- General manager: Max Johnson
- Manager: Toby Hall
- Media: The Cincinnati Enquirer, HomeTeam Network
- Website: florenceyalls.com

The Florence Y'alls are a professional baseball team based in Florence, Kentucky. The Y'alls compete in the National Association of Professional Baseball (NAPB) as a member of the Central Division in the Midwest Conference. The franchise is one of the oldest current running teams of the league. Founded in 1994, the team was known as the Erie Sailors for their first season. For the next four seasons, the team was named the Johnstown Steal, then the Johnstown Johnnies until 2002, as well as the Florence Freedom until 2019.

The Y'alls have had the most playoff berths in all FL franchises based in the United States (11), and are third overall amongst active teams in total Frontier Cup championships, behind the Schaumburg Boomers (4) and Windy City ThunderBolts (3). The Y'alls have played their home games at Thomas More Stadium since the 2004 season.

Between the 2001 and 2011 seasons, the Y'alls missed the playoffs 11 seasons in a row. After that, from 2012 to 2021, they made the playoffs 5 times in 10 seasons.

== History ==
The team began in Erie, Pennsylvania, as the Erie Sailors in 1994, before moving to Point Stadium in Johnstown, Pennsylvania, in 1995, where it was first known as the Johnstown Steal then the Johnstown Johnnies beginning in 1998. The team won two Frontier League championships in their time in Johnstown, one in 1995 as the Steal and one in 2000 as the Johnnies. The team was sold after the 2002 season and moved to Florence, where it became known as the Freedom. The Freedom played at Foundation Field in Hamilton, Ohio during the 2003 season while their new park was being built in Florence.

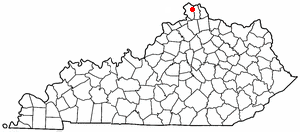
Location of Florence within Kentucky

In July 2004, shortly after the opening of Champion Window Field, contractors began filing liens against the Freedom, accusing the team of not paying for work done on the stadium. Eventually, 33 liens totaling US$4.7 million were filed. In August, Fifth Third Bank sued team part-owner Chuck Hildebrant for failing to repay multiple loans taken out to finance the stadium construction. As part of the lawsuit, it was revealed that Hildebrant had used 204 acres (0.83 km^{2}) of land that he did not own as collateral for the loans, and that he had given the bank a forged document as proof of ownership. Hildebrant was later the subject of a federal white collar crime investigation and sentenced to prison in October 2005. The team was sold in November 2004 to a new ownership group led by Clint Brown, who was not associated with Hildebrant's ownership group.

In 2005, former Chillicothe Paints manager Jamie Keefe was signed as the team's new manager. Keefe led the Freedom to their first winning record (53–42). The team finished tied for second place in the Frontier League's East Division, missing out on the playoffs by a tiebreaker. Three Freedom players hit more than 20 home runs in 2005—outfielder Mike Galloway (24), designated hitter Kyle Geswein (24), and first baseman Trevor Hall (23). Closer Ted Rowe tied for the league lead in saves with 17.

In 2006, the Freedom had a losing record of 38–50, finishing fifth in the Frontier League East Division.

In 2007, the Freedom again had a sub-.500 record, going 42–54 for the season. This placed the team third in the East Division. Outfielder Reggie Watson led the league in batting average (.357) and steals (20), while also winning the Home Run Derby at the 2007 Frontier League All-Star Game, hosted by Florence. Outfielder Ryan Basham earned the Frontier League Rookie of the Year award, hitting .298 with 17 home runs on the season.

In 2007, Champion Window Field, home of the Freedom, hosted its first Frontier League All-Star Game, with the Freedom's East Division winning 11–3. The Freedom's Reggie Watson had three runs batted in and was named the game's Most Valuable Player. The game's attendance of 4,483 set a new attendance record for a Frontier League All-Star Game.

In 2008, the team finished with a 47–49 record, missing a playoff spot by four games. For the first time, the Freedom attracted over 100,000 fans to Champion Window Field, with a total of 106,707 fans for the year.

In early 2008, the Freedom changed their primary colors from red, white, and blue to black, red, and silver.

In 2009, the Freedom opened against the Midwest Sliders of Ypsilanti at home on May 20. Florence opened 2009 with two major changes—FieldTurf instead of a natural grass surface and a new coaching staff. Toby Rumfield became the new field manager, and Freedom alumni Greg Stone, the Freedom's all-time hit leader, as hitting coach and Bill Browett as pitching coach.

In 2016, the team introduced their new mascot Y'All Star, an anthropomorphic water tower.

Clint Brown died in January 2018 after 15 years as team president and owner. He was succeeded by his widow, Kim Brown.

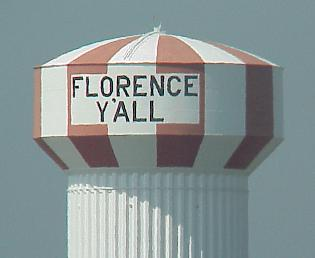
The Florence Y'all Water Tower, namesake of the team

Sale of the team to a group of local investors was finalized July 2019. In October 2019, the new owners announced a rebranding of the team for the 2020 season, dropping the name Freedom immediately. The new team name, Florence Y'alls, was announced in January 2020. The team takes its new name from the local Florence Y'all Water Tower.

Due to the COVID-19 pandemic, the Frontier League canceled their 2020 season and did not play.

The Y'alls successfully returned to the playoffs in 2021, capturing their fifth division title. However, they lost the first round to the Schaumburg Boomers 3 games to 1.

In March 2022, the Y'alls and Thomas More University partnered to rename the home of the Florence Y'alls Thomas More Stadium. As part of the agreement, the stadium will also become the home of the Thomas More Saints baseball team starting in Spring 2023. The team missed the playoffs for the first time since 2018.

The Y'alls returned to the playoffs in 2026 after missing the playoffs between 2022 and 2025. However, they lost to the Washington Wild Things in the Wild Card Round.

== Seasons ==
Erie Sailors (Frontier League)
Year	W-L	PCT	Place	Postseason
1994	42–25	.627	2nd in FL East	Won 1st Round Playoff vs. Ohio Valley 2–0. Won Frontier League Championship vs. Lancaster Scouts 2–0.
Total	42–25	.627	—	
Playoffs	4–0	1.000	—	1 Playoff appearance, 1 Championship
Johnstown Steal/Johnnies (Frontier League)
1995	46–23	.667	1st in FL	Won 1st Round Playoff vs. Richmond Roosters 2–0. Won Frontier League Championship vs. Zanesville Greys 2–0.
1996	41–33	.554	2nd in FL East	Lost 1st Round Playoff vs. Chillicothe Paints 2–1.
1997	47–33	.588	1st in FL East	Lost 1st Round Playoff vs. Canton Crocodiles 2–0.
1998	34–43	.442	3rd in FL East	Did not qualify
1999	43–41	.512	3rd in FL East	Lost 1st Round Playoff vs. London Werewolves 2–0.
2000	48–36	.571	1st in FL East	Won 1st Round Playoff vs. London Werewolves 2–0. Won Frontier League Championship vs. Evansville Otters 3–1.
2001	44–40	.524	4th in FL East	Did not qualify
2002	30–54	.357	6th in FL East	Did not qualify
Total	333–303	.524	—	—
Playoffs	8–9	.471	—	3 Division titles, 5 Playoff appearances, 2 Championships
Florence Freedom/Y'alls (Frontier League)
2003	27–61	.307	6th in FL East	Did not qualify
2004	31–65	.323	6th in FL East	Did not qualify
2005	53–42	.558	3rd in FL East	Did not qualify
2006	38–56	.404	5th in FL East	Did not qualify
2007	42–54	.438	3rd in FL East	Did not qualify
2008	47–49	.490	4th in FL East	Did not qualify
2009	49–47	.510	3rd in FL East	Did not qualify
2010	38–58	.396	5th in FL East	Did not qualify
2011	39–57	.406	6th in FL East	Did not qualify
2012	57–39	.594	2nd in FL East	Won 1st Round Playoff vs. Gateway Grizzlies 3–2. Lost Frontier League Championship vs. Southern Illinois Miners 3–1.
2013	53–43	.552	3rd in FL East	Did not qualify
2014	41–55	.427	5th in FL East	Did not qualify
2015	49–47	.510	3rd in FL East	Lost Frontier League Play-in Game vs. River City Rascals 6–5
2016	46–49	.484	4th in FL West	Did not qualify
2017	61–35	.635	1st in FL West	Won 1st Round Playoff vs. Washington Wild Things 3–1. Lost Frontier League Championship vs. Schaumburg Boomers 3–1.
2018	49–47	.510	3rd in FL West	Did not qualify
2019	57–39	.594	2nd in FL West	Won 1st Round Playoff vs. Lake Erie Crushers 3–0. Lost Frontier League Championship vs. River City Rascals 3–2.
2020	–	–	–	Season not played due to COVID-19
2021	57–38	.600	1st in FL West	Lost 1st Round Playoff vs. Schaumburg Boomers 3–1.
2022	39–56	.411	7th in FL West	Did not qualify
2023	38–58	.396	7th in FL West	Did not qualify
2024	44–51	.463	5th in FL West	Did not qualify
2025	43–53	.448	3rd in FL West	Did not qualify
2026	55–47	.539	3rd in FL West	Lost Wild Card Round vs. Washington Wild Things 2–1.
Total	963–1056	.478	—	—
Playoffs	13–13	.500	—	2 Division titles, 5 Playoff appearances

== Current roster ==
Florence Y'alls roster
Active roster	Coaching staff
Pitchers: -- Pedro Alfonseca; -- Dalton Barham; -- Michael Barker; -- Ethan Bell; -- Greg Blackman; -- Beau Blanchard; -- Jason Bollman; -- Shaun Gamelin; -- Carter Hines; -- Jett Lodes; 22 Blake Loubier; -- Conner Mackay; -- Eli Majick; -- Zane Robbins; 20 Jonaiker Villalobos; Catchers: -- Sean Lynch; -- Michael Quinones; Infielders: -- Brendan Bobo; -- Eddie Javier; Outfielders: -- Armani Smith; 13 Hank Zeisler	Manager: 99 Chad Rhoades; Coaches: 16 Karl Craigie (pitching); 23 Craig Massey (hitting); -- Jason Stowers (assistant); Disabled list; ‡ Inactive list; § Suspended list; updated May 4, 2025 Transactions

== Alumni ==
Below is a list of Y'alls alumni who have gone on to play MLB-affiliated baseball. The alumni are sorted by peak level of baseball in which they have participated after playing for Florence. In total, 20 Y'alls alumni have signed professional contracts after playing for Florence, with five making the major leagues.

As of July 3, 2021:

=== MLB ===
Player	Year w/ FLO	Current/Most recent team	Active
Chris Jakubauskas	2003	Columbus Clippers (AAA)	No
Corey Thurman	2005	York Revolution (Ind.)	No
Steve Delabar	2008	Round Rock Express	No
Stephen Cardullo	2012	High Point Rockers	No
Aaron Wilkerson	2013	Oklahoma City Dodgers	Yes

=== AAA ===
Player	Year w/ FLO	Current/Most recent team	Active
Daniel Touchet	2005	Joliet JackHammers (Ind.)	No
Michael DeMark	2006	Tigres de Quintana Roo	No

=== AA ===
Player	Year w/ FLO	Current/Most recent team	Active
Elvys Quezada	2008	Fargo-Moorhead RedHawks	No
Yosandy Ibanez	2008	Pittsfield Colonials	No
Erold Andrus	2010	York Revolution	No

=== A-Advanced ===
The following Freedom alumni have advanced as far as Class A-Advanced: Jason Tuttle (Freedom 2003), Kevin Rival (2004), Tim Turner (2004), Mike Galloway (2005), Heath Castle (2006), Johnny Washington (2008)

=== A ===
The following Freedom alumni have advanced as far as Class A: James Morrison (Freedom 2004), Steven Pickerell (2005, 2009), Joel Posey (2004–05), Conor McGeehan (2006), Tyler Evans (2007), Neall French (2008)

=== Short Season A ===
The following Freedom alumni have advanced as far as Class A-Short Season:

=== Rookie-Advanced ===
The following Freedom alumni have advanced as far as Rookie Advanced class: J.D. Foust (Freedom 2004)

=== Rookie ===
The following Freedom alumni have advanced as far as Rookie Class: Reggie Watson (Freedom 2006–7), Preston Vancil (Freedom 2010)

- **Bold** denotes alumnus' still being active in professional baseball.

== Records ==
Below is a list of Frontier League individual records set by Y'alls players as of the end of the 2009 season.

=== Individual game ===
- Runs batted in – 9 by Garth McKinney on August 11, 2008 (three-way tie)
- Hits – 6 by Matt Cooksey (2006), Nick Salotti (2007), and Garth McKinney (2008) (seven-way tie)
- No-hitter – Preston Vancil on July 26, 2009

=== Single season ===
- Games started (pitching) – 22 by Everett Saul in 2009 (three-way tie)
