= Patrick Scalabrini =

Canadian baseball player and coach (born 1977)

Québec Capitales – No. 5
- First baseman / Manager
- Born: March 7, 1977 (age 49); Coaticook, Quebec, Canada
- Bats: Right Throws: Right

Patrick Alain Scalabrini (born March 7, 1977) is a Canadian professional baseball coach and former first baseman who is currently the manager for the Québec Capitales of the Frontier League. Scalabrini has been in the Capitales organization in different roles since playing as a first baseman from 2001 to 2009. He became their manager in 2010.

Scalabrini led the Capitales to the playoffs 11 times since 2010, which they have won a total of eight league championships since he became the manager. He has also led the team with four Can-Am League championships in a row, in 2010, 2011, 2012 and 2013. He also led the team to more championships in the Frontier League with the Capitales in 2022, 2023, 2024, and 2025.

== Early life ==
Scalabrini was born in Coaticook, Quebec, to Claude Scalabrini and Rachel Blouin. He grew up in his hometown, where he attended La Frontalière High School, and played as a pitcher for the 1989 baseball team. He also played for a little league from 1983 to 1988.

As a youth, Scalabrini also played American Legion Baseball, an experience that he said in a 2018 interview, "Gave me the platform to be seen because there are always scouts at American Legion games. It had a big part on my development as a player and helping me get a jump on a professional career."

== Playing career ==
Scalabrini played two seasons with the University of Hawai'i from 1991 to 1992. He then served as a second baseman for the Québec Diamants of the Quebec Junior Elite Baseball League from 1993 to 1994.

Standing at 6-foot-1 and 215 pounds, Scalabrini signed a contract with the Québec Capitales of the Northern League in 2001. He played two seasons with the team as a first baseman. Scalabrini mostly played first base and some other infielder positions, registering a batting average of .241 and .325 with 12 home runs in 521 at bats. He then played for the Winnipeg Goldeyes of the American Association from 2003 to 2004. Scalabrini played four seasons of affiliated ball, reaching the High-A level with the Frederick Keys and the Delmarva Shorebords of the South Atlantic League. Following a minor injury after the 2006 season, he returned with the Québec Capitales for his last three seasons of play, when he has won the 2009 Can-Am League Championship during his final season.

== See also ==
- Québec Capitales
