= Schaumburg Boomers =

Frontier League baseball team in the Chicagoland area

- Founded in 2012; Schaumburg, Illinois

Team logo	Cap insignia

Minor league affiliations
- Class: Independent (2012–present)
- League: National Association of Professional Baseball (2012–present)
- Conference: Midwest Conference
- Division: West Division

Minor league titles
- League titles (4): 2013; 2014; 2017; 2021
- Division titles (5): 2013; 2017; 2021; 2025; 2026
- Wild card berths (3): 2022; 2023; 2025

Team data
- Colors: Black, orange, white, gold, brown, green
- Ballpark: Wintrust Field (2012–present)
- Owner/ Operator: REV Entertainment
- General manager: Michael Larson
- Manager: Jamie Bennett
- Media: Daily Herald, HomeTeam Network
- Website: boomersbaseball.com

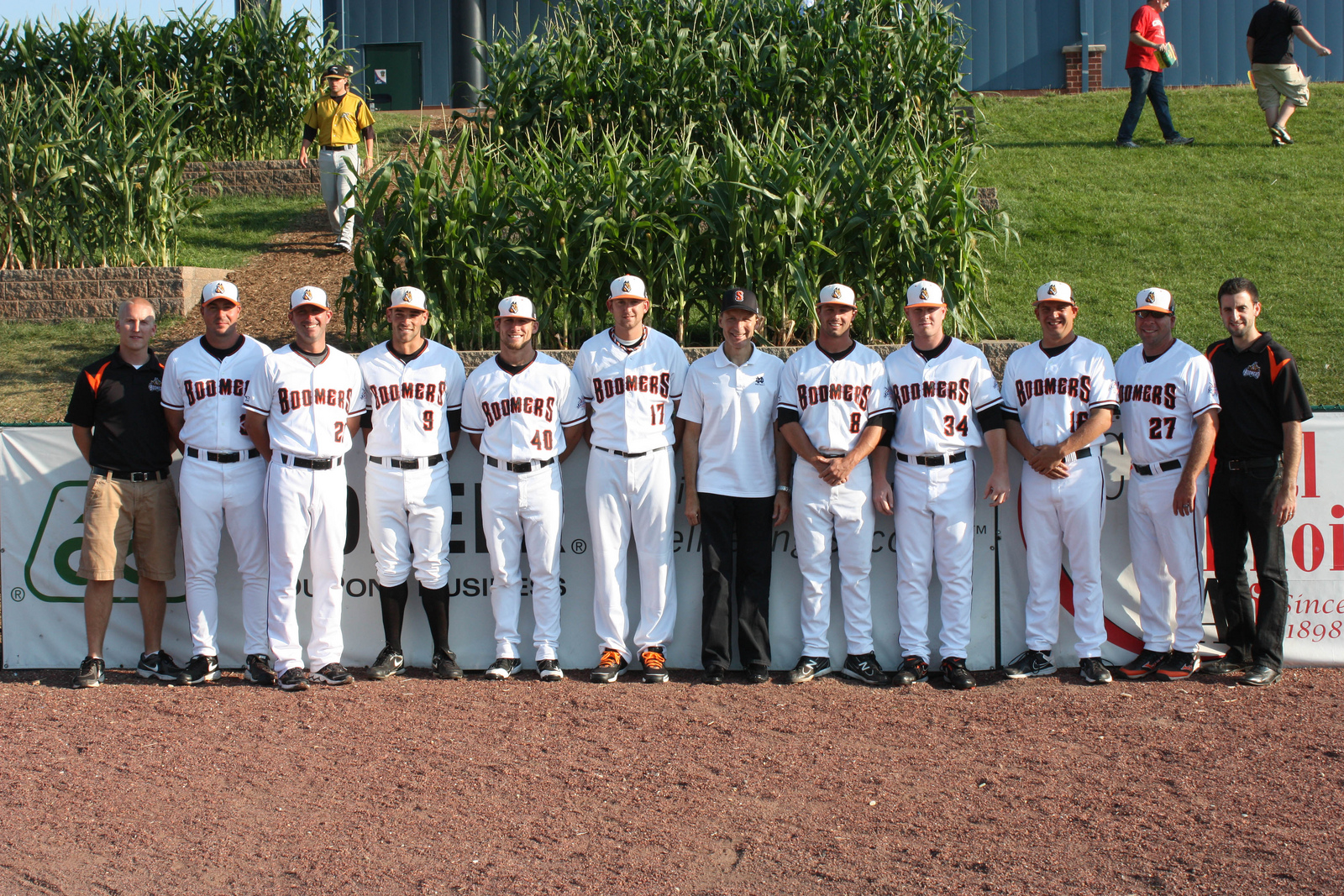
2012 Schaumburg Boomers All-Stars

The Schaumburg Boomers (originally the Schaumburg Boomers Baseball Club) are a professional baseball team based in Schaumburg, Illinois. The Boomers compete in the National Association of Professional Baseball (NAPB) as a member of the West Division in the Midwest Conference. The Boomers have won four NAPB championships since their founding in 2012. They are one of three NAPB teams located in the Chicago metropolitan area, along with the Joliet Slammers and Windy City ThunderBolts; a fourth, the Kane County Cougars, is planned to join the league in 2027. Since the 2012 season, the team has played its home games at the Wintrust Field, which they share with the National Collegiate Athletic Association's Dominican Stars.

The "Boomers" nickname comes from a common nickname for males of the greater prairie chicken species, a bird which was once abundant in the Midwest but is now a vulnerable species. That bird's nickname comes from the dance these males do in order to attract females for mating purposes. The Boomers carry on the mascot's tradition by performing a reenactment of the prairie chicken's dance in between innings during games.

== History ==
Originally, the team was set to play in the American Association of Professional Baseball under the ownership of their rival Joliet Slammers principal owner Alan Oremus; however, Oremus sold the team to Gary SouthShore RailCats owner Pat Salvi, who moved the team to the Frontier League because of his loyalty to the RailCats and lack of interest in setting up a conflict should the two teams play against each other. Under Oremus's ownership, the team had held a name-the-team contest, with the winning selection of "Mallers". After the ownership change, however, the Boomers name, logo, and colors were unveiled on October 18, 2011.

The first signed roster player was infielder Andrew Cohn of Emory University. Shortstop Gerard Hall recorded the first hit in Boomers history in a 4–0 shutout against the Lake Erie Crushers in Avon, Ohio, in the franchise's first-ever regular season game. Outfielder Jereme Milons had the first extra-base hit in team history with a double to centerfield in the same game.

The Boomers won their home debut with a 5–2 victory over the Florence Freedom in front of 6,067 fans at Boomers Stadium. Outfielder Nate Baumann hit the first home run at Boomers Stadium with a two-run blast to left in the five-run sixth inning.

The Boomers finished the first half of their inaugural season as the Frontier League West Division Leaders with a record of 29–19. The team had a total of 10 representatives appear in the 2012 Frontier League All-Star Game in Normal. Manager Jamie Bennett managed the West Division squad and was joined by his coaching staff, Mike Kashirsky, Paul Kubon, C.J. Thieleke, and team trainer Scott Waehler. Schaumburg's Frank Pfister was selected as the West Division's starting third baseman, and was joined by outfielders Sean Mahley and Chad Mozingo and pitchers Cameron Roth and Patrick Mincey.

The Schaumburg Boomers won the 2013 Frontier League championship in September 2013, becoming the first team in league history to finish the playoffs undefeated (in this case 6–0 as they won two best-of-five series). They defeated the Lake Erie Crushers in the championship final.

The Boomers again won the 2014 Frontier League championship, winning back-to-back titles. They beat the Southern Illinois Miners 2 games to 1 in the divisional round, and beat the River City Rascals 3 games to 1 to win the title.

The Boomers also won the 2017 Frontier League championship by defeating the Evansville Otters in the first round 3 games to 1, and beat the Florence Freedom, also 3 games to 1, in the championship round to win the title.

The Boomers won their fourth title by winning the 2021 Frontier League championship as they beat the Florence Y'alls in the first round 3 games to 1, and defeating the Washington Wild Things 3 games to 2 in the championship round.

In 2026, Pat Salvi sold the team to REV Entertainment, the official sports and entertainment company of the Texas Rangers, who also have an ownership stake in the Long Island Ducks (ALPB), Kane County Cougars (NAPB), and Cleburne Railroaders (NAPB).

== Season-by-season records ==
Schaumburg Boomers seasons (2012–present)
Season	Record	Average	Finished	Playoffs
2012	54–42	.563	3rd in FL West	Did not qualify
2013	59–37	.615	1st in FL West	Won Divisional Round over Florence Freedom 3–0; Won Championship over Lake Erie Crushers 3–0
2014	61–35	.635	2nd in FL West	Won Divisional Round over Southern Illinois Miners 2–1; Won Championship over River City Rascals 3–1
2015	40–56	.417	7th in FL West	Did not qualify
2016	41–55	.427	6th in FL East	Did not qualify
2017	66–30	.688	1st in FL East	Won First Round over Evansville Otters 3–1; Won Championship over Florence Freedom 3–1
2018	45–51	.469	4th in FL East	Did not qualify
2019	47–49	.490	2nd in FL East	Did not qualify
2020	-	-	-	Season not played due to COVID-19
2021	51–45	.531	1st in FL Central	Won First Round over Florence Y'alls 3–1; Won Championship over Washington Wild Things 3-2
2022	54–43	.557	2nd in FL West	Won Wild Card Game over Evansville Otters 5-1; Won Divisional Round over Washington Wild Things 2-0; Lost Championship to Québec Capitales 3–1
2023	54–41	.568	2nd in FL West	Lost Wild Card Game over Evansville Otters 4-3
2024	51–45	.531	4th in FL West	Did not qualify
2025	58–38	.604	1st in FL West	Won Wild Card Round over Lake Erie Crushers 2-0; Won Midwest Conference Finals over Gateway Grizzlies 3-0; Lost Championship to Québec Capitales 3–2
2026	57–45	.559	1st in FL West	Lost Wild Card Round to Evansville Otters 2–1
Totals	684–571	.546		20–4; 8 playoff appearances

== Radio ==
Games are broadcast on WRMN (1410 AM, Elgin, Illinois) by Boomers broadcaster Tim Calderwood.

== Mascot ==
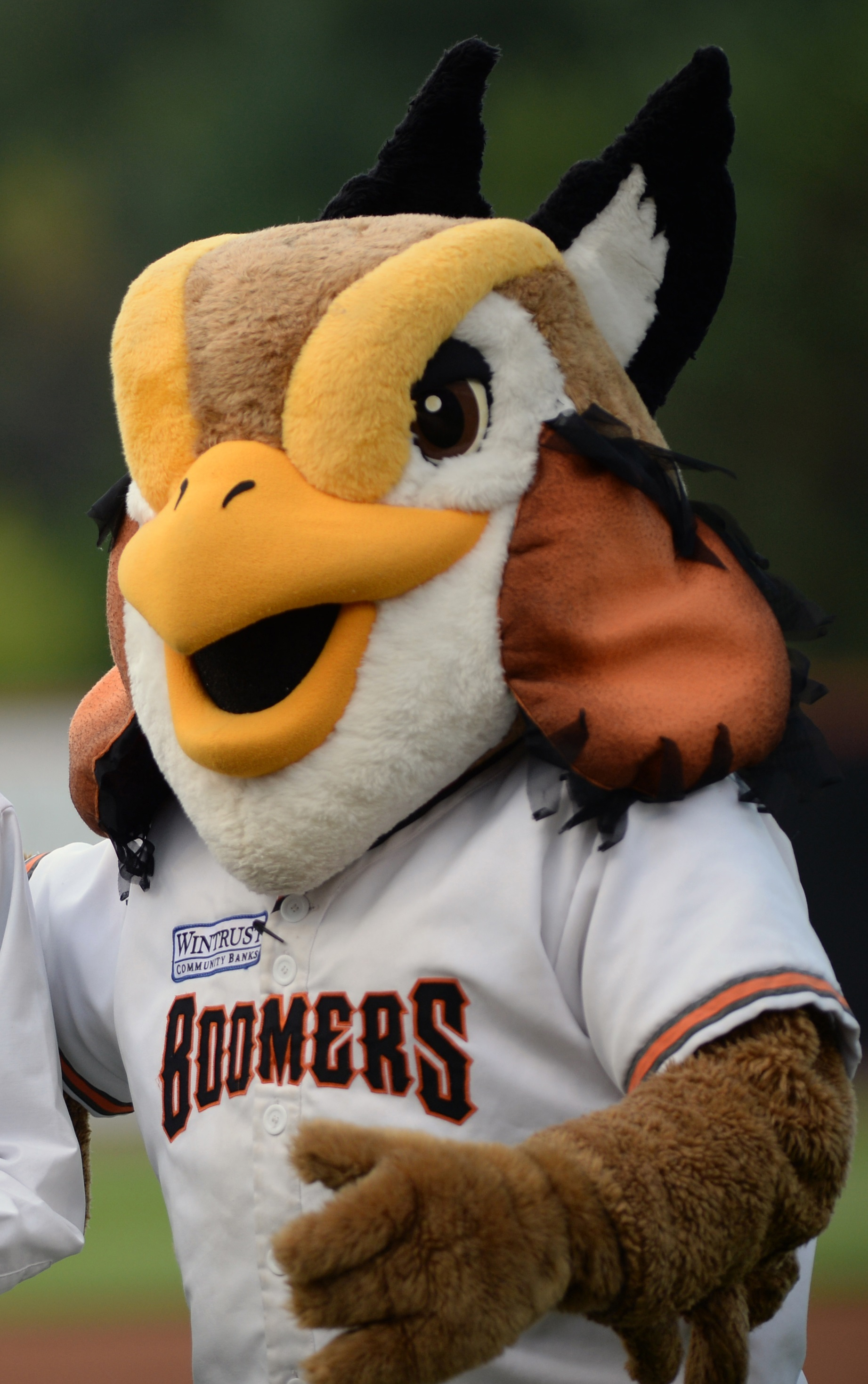
Coop, the team's mascot

The mascot of the Schaumburg Boomers is Coop the boomer. Coop is portrayed by a human dressed in a prairie chicken costume.

== Current roster ==
Schaumburg Boomers roster
Active roster	Coaching staff
Pitchers: 17 Cole Cook; 31 Antonio Frias; 33 Aaron Glickstein; 19 Ross Thompson; 22 Quinlan Wiley; 6 Nick Paciorek; 28 Hambleton Oliver; 4 Kai Taylor; 16 Deretd Parra; 26 Isaiah Rivera; 34 Derek Salata; 8 Kobey Schlotman; 18 Christian Johnson; 12 Dylan Stutsman; 14 Mitch White; 21 Eric Turner; Catchers: 15 John Fiorenza; 30 Sam Kuchinski; Infielders: 36 Anthony Calarco; 7 Alec Craig; 3 Christian Fedko; 5 Kyle Fitzgerald; 2 Alec Gonzalez; 10 Will Prater; Outfielders: 23 Michael Gould; 11 Aaron Simmons; 9 Andrew Sojka; 31 Bren Spillane; 13 Banks Tolley	Manager: -- Jamie Bennett; Coaches: -- Bill Fratto (assistant/first base); -- Nick Oddo (hitting); -- Jason Stowers (pitching); Disabled list; ‡ Inactive list; § Suspended list; updated July 20, 2025 Transactions

== Notable alumni ==
- Justin Erasmus (2014)
- Jake Cousins (2019)
- Willy García (2021)
- Braxton Davidson (2021–2022)
