= Joliet Slammers =

Frontier League baseball team in Joliet, Illinois

Logo	Cap insignia

Information
- League: National Association of Professional Baseball
- Location: Joliet, Illinois
- Ballpark: Slammers Stadium
- Founded: 2011
- Nickname: Jailbirds
- League championships: 2 (2011, 2018)
- Division championships: 2 (2011, 2016)
- Playoff berths: 3 2011 2016 2018
- Colors: Green, orange, white, black
- Mascot: Spikes & J.L Bird
- Ownership: Mike Veeck; Bill Murray; Night Train Veeck
- General manager: Night Train Veeck
- Manager: Mike Pinto
- Media: 1340 WJOL; The Herald-News; The Joliet Bugle; HomeTeam Network
- Website: jolietslammers.com

The Joliet Slammers are a professional baseball team based in Joliet, Illinois. The Slammers compete in the National Association of Professional Baseball (NAPB) as a member of the West Division in the Midwest Conference. The team plays their home games at the Slammers Stadium, and is owned by Mike Veeck, Bill Murray and the Night Train Veeck company. The Slammers are not affiliated with any Major League Baseball teams and are outside of the Minor League Baseball system.

The Slammers were founded in 2010 and began play in the 2011 season. The team was founded following the departure of the Joliet JackHammers, who were based in Joliet from 2002 to 2010. The Slammers captured their first Frontier League championship in their inaugural season, beating the River City Rascals 3 games to 1. The team name refers to the famous prisons of Joliet and Will County (Joliet Correctional Center and Stateville Correctional Center) as well as a common baseball term. The Slammers are one of the four NAPB teams located in the Chicago metropolitan area, along with the Windy City ThunderBolts, Schaumburg Boomers, and Kane County Cougars.

== History ==
The Joliet Slammers were founded in 2011. They replaced the Joliet JackHammers of the Northern League after the franchise was crippled by numerous financial issues. The JackHammers franchise was put up for sale and Steel City Baseball, LLC, bought out all assets, including the front office, the ticketing system, and the lease of the ballpark. The company behind the popular card game Cards Against Humanity announced in December 2017 that they had purchased the naming rights to the stadium, calling it the "Cards Against Humanity Baseball Place", but the company's claim has been disputed by Slammers management.

On September 18, 2011, the Slammers were named Frontier League champions after defeating the River City Rascals 6–5 in Joliet, taking the best-of-five Frontier League championship series three games to one. Following the 2012 season, the Slammers were purchased on October 15, 2012, by Joliet Community Baseball & Entertainment, LLC. The team's name, stadium, league, and overall branding remained the same.

In January 2024 the team announced new ownership, headed by Mike Veeck, Bill Murray as well as Night Train Veeck. Murray and Veeck were part-owners of the St. Paul Saints until 2023, when, following the team's shift into affiliated ball, that team was sold to a new ownership group.

== Season-by-season records ==
Joliet Slammers
Season	Record	Win %	Finish	Manager	Playoffs
2011	56–40	.583	1st	Bart Zeller	Won Division Series vs. Lake Erie Crushers, 3–0; Won Frontier League Championship vs. River City Rascals, 3–1
2012	37–58	.389	6th	Bart Zeller	Did not qualify
2013	38–57	.400	6th	Mike Breyman	Did not qualify
2014	40–56	.417	6th	Jeff Isom	Did not qualify
2015	42–54	.438	5th	Jeff Isom	Did not qualify
2016	51–45	.531	1st	Jeff Isom	Lost Division Series vs. Evansville Otters, 3–1
2017	42–54	.438	5th	Jeff Isom	Did not qualify
2018	54–42	.563	2nd	Jeff Isom	Won Division Series vs. River City Rascals, 3–2; Won Frontier League Championship vs. Washington Wild Things, 3–2
2019	40–56	.417	4th	Jeff Isom	Did not qualify
2020	21-5	.807	1st	Billy Petrick	Won City of Champions Cup (Non-Frontier League)
2021	39–56	.417	4th	Aaron Nieckula	Did not qualify
2022	49–47	.510	4th	Daniel Schlereth	Did not qualify
2023	46–50	.479	5th	Daniel Schlereth	Did not qualify
2024	38–58	.396	8th	Mike Pinto	Did not qualify
2025	43–52	.453	5th	Mike Pinto	Did not qualify
2026	42–60	.412	4th	Mike Pinto	Did not qualify
Totals	632–740	.478	—	—	13–8 Playoff record 3 playoff appearances, 2 Division series wins, 2 Frontier League championships

== Single season records ==
Statistics as of the completion of the 2024 season

=== Offensive ===
Statistic	Record	Player	Year
Hits	135	Grant DeBruin	2014
Doubles	29	Grant DeBruin/Carter Bell	2014/2016
Triples	6	Josh Flores	2011
Home Runs	27	Matt Warkentin	2023
RBIs	83	Matt Warkentin	2024
Walks	57	Russell Moldenhauer	2014
Stolen Bases	35	Josh Flores	2011

=== Pitching ===
Statistic	Record	Player	Year
Wins	13	Jake Renshaw	2011
Strikeouts	131	Cole Cook	2023
Saves	28	Ryan Quigley	2011

== Franchise leaders ==
Statistics as of the completion of the 2024 season

=== Offensive ===
Games played
1. Tyler Depreta-Johnson...257 (2021–2023)
2. Kyle Maunas...248 (2011–2013)
3. Lane Baremore...219 (2021–2023)

Hits
1. Liam McArthur...216 (2023–present)
2. Alfredo Rodriguez...205 (2015–2016)
2. Kyle Maunas...205 (2011–2013)
3. Lane Baremore...204 (2021–2023)

Doubles
1. Brylie Ware...43 (2021–2022)
1. Kyle Manus...43 (2011–2013)
2. Grant DeBruin...41 (2013–2014)
3. Matt Warkentin...40 (2023–2024)

Triples
1. Matt McGarry...9 (2022–2023)
2. Josh Flores...6 (2011)
2. Scott Holzwasser...6 (2021–2023)
3. Ridge Hoopii-Haslam...5 (2017–2019)

Home Runs
1. Matt Warkentin...51 (2023–2024)
2. Kyle Manus...32 (2011–2013)
3. Erik Lis...28 (2011–2012)

RBI
1. Matt Warkentin...147 (2023–2024)
2. Kyle Manus...128 (2011–2013)
3. Erik Lis...122 (2011–2012)

Stolen Bases
1. London Lindley...53 (2018–2019)
1. Ridge Hoopii-Haslam...53 (2017–2019)
2. Charlie White...48 (2015–2016)
3. Travis Bolin...41 (2017–2019)

=== Pitching ===
Innings Pitched
1. Cam Aufderheide...323.2 (2021–2023)
2. Cole Cook...254.1 (2022–2023)
3. Liam O’Sullivan...244.2 (2016, 2018)

Strikeouts
1. Cole Cook... 240 (2022–2023)
1. Cam Aufderheide...240 (2021–2023)
2. Shane Bryant...187 (2015–2018)
3. Liam O’Sullivan...186 (2016, 2018)

Wins
1. Cole Cook...23 (2022–2023)
2. Liam O’Sullivan...22 (2016, 2018)
3. Scot Hoffman...14 (2017–2019)
3. Jake Renshaw...14 (2011–2012)

Saves
1. Ryan Quigley...28 (2011)
2. Ryan Koziol...23 (2019)
3. Confesor Lara...20 (2016–2017)

== Current roster ==
Joliet Slammers roster
Active roster	Coaching staff
Pitchers: -- CJ Blowers; -- Chase Hopewell; -- Gunnar Kines; -- Kyle Klingenbeck; -- Aidan McEvoy; -- Tony Oreb; -- Bryan Peña; -- Jordan Powell; -- Alex Vera; 19 Zac Westcott; -- Kyle White; Catchers: -- Craig Corliss; Infielders: -- Ian Battipaglia; -- Braylin Marine; -- John McGuire; -- Jamey Smart; -- Paul Toetz; -- Zach Weaver; -- Danny Wuestenfeld; Outfielders: -- Blake Berry; -- Nick Iannantone; 28 Liam McArthur	Manager: 3 Mike Pinto; Coaches: 5 Ron Biga (bench); -- Tyler Martin (pitching); Disabled list; ‡ Inactive list; § Suspended list; updated April 28, 2025 Transactions

== Notable alumni ==
Several notable players have competed for the Slammers; years in parentheses are seasons when the player was with the team.

- Billy Petrick (2011)
- Jake Sanchez (2012–2013)
- Kaleb Ort (2016–2017)
- Joe Ortiz (2017)
- Dietrich Enns (2020)
- Mitch Glasser (2020)
- Ian Krol (2020)
- Bubby Rossman (2020)
- Brock Stewart (2020)
- Charlie Tilson (2020)
- Braxton Davidson (2021)
- Chris Roycroft (2021–2022)
- Tyler Jay (2022–2023)

Kaleb Ort became the first Joliet Slammers player to make it to the MLB. He made his major league debut on September 13, 2021, as a member of the Boston Red Sox in a game against the Seattle Mariners.

Dietrich Enns had previously played for the Minnesota Twins in the 2017 season. He has moved around the Twins', Padres', and Rays' minor league teams before coming to Joliet due to the COVID-19 pandemic.

Enns was picked up by the Tampa Bay Rays after pitching just 18 innings for the Joliet Tully Monsters in the City of Champions Cup, a four-team league hosted by the Joliet Slammers. Enns was called up to the Rays in the 2021 season.
