= National Association of Professional Baseball =

North American professional baseball league

- Current season, competition or edition: 2026 Frontier League season
- Classification: Independent baseball
- Sport: Baseball
- Founded: 1993
- Commissioner: Steve Tahsler
- No. of teams: 20
- Countries: United States (17 teams); Canada (3 teams)
- Headquarters: ForeFront Field; 2009 Baseball Boulevard; Avon, Ohio, United States
- Continent: North America
- Most recent champions: Ottawa Titans (1st title) (2026)
- Most titles: Schaumburg Boomers and Québec Capitales (4 titles)
- Streaming partner: Frontier League Network / HomeTeam Network
- Website: www.naprobaseball.com

The National Association of Professional Baseball (NAPB; French: Association nationale de baseball professionnel, ANBP), formerly known as the Frontier League (FL; French: Ligue Frontière, LF), is a professional baseball league in North America. Founded in 1993, it is an official MLB Partner League. The league fielded 18 teams during the 2026 season, with 15 in the United States and three in Canada. Two additional clubs have announced plans to join for the 2027 season, bringing the league's proposed membership to 20 teams. The league office is based at ForeFront Field in Avon, Ohio.

The Frontier League was organized during the winter of 1992–1993 to bring professional baseball to communities in West Virginia, eastern Kentucky and southeastern Ohio that were unlikely to receive affiliated professional baseball clubs. It began with eight teams in 1993 and later expanded through new franchises, relocations and the 2019 merger with the Can-Am League.

Beginning in 2026, each club plays a 102-game regular-season schedule. Eight teams qualify for the postseason. The reigning league champions are the Ottawa Titans, who defeated the Evansville Otters, 3–1, in the 2026 Frontier League Championship Series to win their first title.

In April 2026, the league announced that it would rebrand as the National Association of Professional Baseball (NAPB), known in French as the Association nationale de baseball professionnel (ANBP), beginning with the 2027 season. The new branding was publicly launched on October 1, 2026, when the league introduced its new identity through its official social media accounts. The league stated that its history, statistics, records and individual team histories would continue under the new identity.

On September 30, 2026, the Kane County Cougars and Cleburne Railroaders, both previously members of the American Association of Professional Baseball, announced their intention to join the league for the 2027 season.

== History ==
=== Founding and early survival ===
The Frontier League was formed during the winter of 1992–1993 by a group seeking to establish professional baseball in smaller markets in the Ohio Valley and Appalachian region. The inaugural league had eight teams: the Chillicothe Paints, Kentucky Rifles, Lancaster Scouts, Ohio Valley Redcoats, Portsmouth Explorers, Tri-State Tomahawks, West Virginia Coal Sox and Zanesville Greys. The Greys won the first league championship.

The league's first season was unstable. The Tri-State and West Virginia clubs folded within the opening weeks, leaving six teams to complete a 50-game schedule. Bill Lee became the league's first full-time commissioner on June 1, 1994, at a time when the league's long-term survival was uncertain. Lee later said that the league's early priorities were survival, improving facilities and moving into more stable markets.

The league continued to add and relocate franchises through the 1990s. In 1999, the London Werewolves became the first Frontier League team based in Canada.

=== Growth and stabilization ===
By the beginning of the 2000s, the league had begun moving into larger markets and purpose-built professional ballparks. Baseball America credited improved facilities and more stable ownership with helping the league establish a durable operating model.

On June 20, 2000, Brian Tollberg debuted for the San Diego Padres, becoming the first former Frontier League player to reach Major League Baseball. One week later, Morgan Burkhart debuted with the Boston Red Sox. The number of former Frontier League players reaching affiliated baseball continued to grow during the decade.

Attendance also increased substantially. The league drew approximately 719,000 fans in 2001 and more than 950,000 in 2002. Nearly 1.3 million fans attended games in 2004, when the Gateway Grizzlies became the first league club to draw more than 200,000 fans in a season and average more than 4,000 per game. In 2007, the league set a then-record with approximately 1.5 million fans across 12 clubs. The newly established Southern Illinois Miners drew a league-record 259,392 fans that season and averaged more than 5,000 per game.

Lee served as commissioner for 27 years before stepping down in 2021 and becoming commissioner emeritus.

=== Can-Am League merger and MLB partnership ===
On October 16, 2019, the Frontier League announced a merger with the Can-Am League. The New Jersey Jackals, Rockland Boulders, Québec Capitales, Sussex County Miners and Trois-Rivières Aigles joined the Frontier League, while the Ottawa Champions were not included. The combined league was scheduled to begin play in 2020, but the season was canceled because of the COVID-19 pandemic.

On September 24, 2020, Major League Baseball designated the Frontier League as an official MLB Partner League. The partnership formalized cooperation between MLB and the league on player development and other baseball initiatives.

=== Pandemic and Canadian border issues ===
Ottawa was awarded a new Frontier League franchise in September 2020, while the Tri-City ValleyCats joined in January 2021 after the reorganization of Minor League Baseball ended the New York–Penn League.

Continued restrictions at the Canada–United States border prevented the Ottawa Titans, Québec Capitales and Trois-Rivières Aigles from operating normally in 2021. Players from the three organizations were combined into Équipe Québec, which began the season as a traveling team before later playing home games in Quebec City and Trois-Rivières. Ottawa did not play a regular Frontier League season until 2022.

=== Expansion and national growth ===
The Southern Illinois Miners ceased operations after the 2021 season when owners Jayne and John Simmons retired from professional baseball. The league subsequently used the Empire State Greys as a traveling team during the 2022 and 2023 seasons.

The Frontier League logo introduced in 2022 and used until the league's 2026 rebranding.

In April 2022, the league introduced a new visual identity designed by Brian Gundell Design. The logo featured a compass symbolizing the league's geographic expansion and forward direction, with red and blue representing its Canadian and American markets, respectively.

A new franchise at Campanelli Stadium in Brockton, Massachusetts, began play as the New England Knockouts in 2024. After one season, the club was renamed the Brockton Rox.

In September 2024, the league announced two southeastern expansion franchises for the 2025 season. The Mississippi Mud Monsters in Pearl, Mississippi, were announced on September 9 as the league's 17th team following the departure of the Mississippi Braves from Trustmark Park. The Down East Bird Dawgs in Kinston, North Carolina, were announced eight days later as the 18th club and began play at Grainger Stadium, the former home of the Down East Wood Ducks. Both began play in 2025.

The league reported four consecutive regular-season attendance records from 2022 through 2025. Nearly 1.9 million fans attended games in 2025, while 26 players had contracts acquired by Major League Baseball organizations; 22 of those players had no previous professional experience outside the Frontier League. The league again fielded 18 teams in 2026 and expanded the regular season from 96 to 102 games. On May 8, 2026, the Ottawa Titans sold 10,278 tickets for their home opener, establishing a new Frontier League single-game attendance record.

On September 30, 2026, the league announced that the Kane County Cougars and Cleburne Railroaders intended to join for the 2027 season, moving from the American Association of Professional Baseball.

=== Rebrand to National Association of Professional Baseball ===
On April 22, 2026, the Frontier League announced that it would compete as the National Association of Professional Baseball beginning with the 2027 season. The league said the change followed a strategic planning process that began in fall 2024 and reflected the circuit's expansion beyond the regional geography implied by the Frontier League name.

The NAPB brand strategy uses the phrase North America's Home Teams. Its visual identity includes an "NA" monogram with a pennant and French-language versions for the league's Canadian markets. The full identity was presented publicly during the league's 2026 All-Star festivities in Florence, Kentucky. The league stated that its 34-year history, records and individual team histories would continue under the new identity.

== League leadership ==
Bill Lee served as commissioner from June 1994 until 2021 and remained associated with the league as commissioner emeritus after his retirement. He was inducted into the Frontier League Hall of Fame in 2024.

Steve Tahsler was named commissioner in 2023 after 14 years as deputy commissioner. Tahsler had previously worked in several Frontier League front offices, including as general manager of the Windy City ThunderBolts, Slippery Rock Sliders, Evansville Otters and Dubois County Dragons.

== Season structure ==
The Frontier League season includes spring training and exhibition games in late April and early May, a regular season from May through early September, and a postseason that runs into September. Beginning in 2026, all 18 teams play 102 regular-season games.

The league uses two conferences, Atlantic and Midwest, each divided into two divisions. Eight teams qualify for the postseason: the four division winners and two wild-card clubs from each conference. The playoffs are played in three rounds and culminate in the Frontier League Championship Series.

Since 2022, the league has used a sudden-death format to decide games that remain tied after 10 innings. In sudden death, the home manager chooses whether the home team will bat or field for a single half-inning. If the defensive team prevents the offensive team from scoring, the defensive team wins; if the offensive team scores, it wins. In August 2024, the Lake Erie Crushers became the first professional baseball team to win a game without scoring a run when they defeated Schaumburg through the rule after 10 scoreless innings.

=== Players and professional development ===
MLB describes the Frontier League as a player-development pathway and states that the league has placed more than 1,000 players into Major League organizations, with more than half beginning their professional careers in the Frontier League. Brian Tollberg was the first league alumnus to reach the major leagues in 2000, followed a week later by Morgan Burkhart. In 2025, the league reported 26 player contracts acquired by MLB organizations, including 22 players whose only previous professional experience had been in the Frontier League.

Frontier League clubs recruit and sign their own players. The league's roster classifications are designed to reserve a substantial portion of each roster for younger professionals while limiting the number of older or more experienced players. During the offseason, teams may carry up to 34 players on their rosters, but must be down to 28 players by the Sunday prior to opening day. Players signed out of the California Winter League or selected in the National Association draft are exempt from the 34-player offseason limit. The league operates an annual tryout camp and player draft. The 2026 event was the 33rd annual Frontier League Tryout Camp and Draft.

During the season, rosters must consist of between 22 and 25 active players. Players without prior affiliated baseball experience must be at least eighteen years old to play in the National Association. The National Association currently uses five player classifications. A player's age as of September 30 will be used to determine their classification. For regular season and playoff rosters, teams must have a minimum of ten players at the Professional-1 or Professional-2 classification, a minimum of six at the Experienced-1 classification (adjusted down if more than 10 Professionals are on the roster), and a maximum of eight at the Experienced-2 or Veteran classifications; up to two of the eight may hold Veteran status.

- Professional-1: Players who complete a season at 24 years old or younger
- No more than Professional-2: Players who complete a season at 25 years old
- No more than Experienced-1: Players who complete a season at 26 years old
- No more than Experienced-2 : Players who complete a season at ages 27-29
- Veteran classification regardless of prior experience: Players who complete a season at 30 years old or older

Players must have accrued more than 75 at bats, 15 games pitched, or 30 innings pitched in a season for that season to count toward the classifications. Players who have served on active military duty will receive an exemption to the age limit for any classification of one year for each year of active duty that was served.

== Teams ==
Locations of teams in the East, North, Central, and West divisions for the 2027 season.

The league uses a two-conference, four-division alignment. The Atlantic Conference consists of the East and North divisions, while the Midwest Conference consists of the Central and West divisions. All 18 permanent clubs competed in the 2026 season.

=== List of teams ===
Overview of NA teams
Conference	Division	Team	City	Stadium	Capacity	Founded	Joined	General manager	Manager
Atlantic	East	Down East Bird Dawgs	Kinston, North Carolina	Grainger Stadium	3,400	2025		Shari Massengill	Brett Wellman
Atlantic	East	New Jersey Jackals	Paterson, New Jersey	Hinchliffe Stadium	7,800	1998	2020	Orlando Cruz	Bobby M. Jones
Atlantic	East	New York Boulders	Pomona, New York	Clover Stadium	8,362	2011	2020	Rob Janetschek	T. J. Stanton
Atlantic	East	Sussex County Miners	Augusta, New Jersey	Skylands Stadium	4,200	2015	2020	Vincent Sangemino	Chris Widger
Atlantic	East	Washington Wild Things	Washington, Pennsylvania	EQT Park	3,200	2002		—	Tom Vaeth
Atlantic	North	Brockton Rox	Brockton, Massachusetts	Campanelli Stadium	4,750	2024		Connor Carey	Jerod Edmondson
Atlantic	North	Ottawa Titans	Ottawa, Ontario	Ottawa Stadium	10,332	2021	2022	Martin Boyce	Bobby Brown
Atlantic	North	Québec Capitales	Quebec City, Quebec	Stade Canac	4,297	1999	2020	Mike Petillion	Patrick Scalabrini
Atlantic	North	Tri-City ValleyCats	Troy, New York	Joseph L. Bruno Stadium	6,500	2002	2021	Matt Callahan	Greg Tagert
Atlantic	North	Trois-Rivières Aigles	Trois-Rivières, Quebec	Stade Quillorama	4,000	2013	2020	Michel Laberge	T. J. White
Midwest	Central	Evansville Otters	Evansville, Indiana	Bosse Field	5,181	1995		Tony Buccilli	Andy McCauley
Midwest	Central	Florence Y'alls	Florence, Kentucky	Thomas More Stadium	4,500	2003		Max Johnson	Toby Hall
Midwest	Central	Kane County Cougars	Geneva, Illinois	Northwestern Medicine Field	10,923	1991	2027	Curtis Haug	David Holmberg
Midwest	Central	Lake Erie Crushers	Avon, Ohio	ForeFront Field	5,000	2009		—	Jared Lemieux
Midwest	Central	Schaumburg Boomers	Schaumburg, Illinois	Wintrust Field	5,665	2012		Michael Larson	Jamie Bennett
Midwest	West	Cleburne Railroaders	Cleburne, Texas	La Moderna Field	3,750	2017	2027	Jimmy Thrush	Pete Incaviglia
Midwest	West	Gateway Grizzlies	Sauget, Illinois	Arsenal BG Ballpark	6,000	2001		Kurt Ringkamp	Kyle Gaedele
Midwest	West	Joliet Slammers	Joliet, Illinois	Slammers Stadium	6,016	2011		Steve Malliet	Mike Pinto
Midwest	West	Mississippi Mud Monsters	Pearl, Mississippi	Trustmark Park	8,480	2025		David Kerr	Jay Pecci
Midwest	West	Windy City ThunderBolts	Crestwood, Illinois	Ozinga Field	3,500	1995	1999	Mike VerSchave	Tom Carcione

Where a club does not currently list a general manager, an em dash is shown.

=== Franchise timeline ===
The tables below show each club's Frontier League history on a common year-by-year scale. Each column represents one Frontier League season. A single uninterrupted block indicates that the franchise retained the same identity across those seasons.

Current identity	Former identity of current franchise	Defunct franchise	Temporary or traveling team	Playing in a different league	Not active

==== Current franchise lineages ====
Current franchise	1990s							2000s										2010s										2020s							
Current franchise	93	94	95	96	97	98	99	00	01	02	03	04	05	06	07	08	09	10	11	12	13	14	15	16	17	18	19	20	21	22	23	24	25	26	27
Evansville Otters	Lancaster Scouts; 1993–94		Evansville Otters; 1995–present																																
Florence Y'alls		Erie Sailors; 1994	Johnstown Steal; 1995–98				Johnstown Johnnies; 1999–2002				Florence Freedom; 2003–19																	Florence Y'alls; 2020–present							
Washington Wild Things					Canton Crocodiles; 1997–2001					Washington Wild Things; 2002–present																									
Windy City ThunderBolts			Will County Claws North Central League; 1995	Will County Cheetahs Heartland League; 1996–1997	Cook County Cheetahs Heartland League; 1998	Cook County Cheetahs; 1999–2003					Windy City ThunderBolts; 2004–present																								
Gateway Grizzlies									Gateway Grizzlies; 2001–present																										
Lake Erie Crushers																	Lake Erie Crushers; 2009–present																		
Joliet Slammers																			Joliet Slammers; 2011–present																
Schaumburg Boomers																				Schaumburg Boomers; 2012–present															
New Jersey Jackals						New Jersey Jackals Northeast League; 1998	New Jersey Jackals Northern League; 1999–2002	New Jersey Jackals Northeast League; 2003–2004		New Jersey Jackals Can-Am League; 2005–2019															New Jersey Jackals; 2020–present										
New York Boulders																			Rockland Boulders Can-Am League; 2011–2019									New York Boulders; 2020–present							
Québec Capitales							Québec Capitales Northern League; 1999–2002				Québec Capitales Northeast League; 2003–2004		Québec Capitales Can-Am League; 2005–2019															Québec Capitales; 2020–present							
Sussex County Miners																							Sussex County Miners Can-Am League; 2015–2019					Sussex County Miners; 2020–present							
Trois-Rivières Aigles																					Trois-Rivières Aigles Can-Am League; 2013–2019							Trois-Rivières Aigles; 2020–present							
Tri-City ValleyCats										Tri-City ValleyCats New York–Penn League; 2013–2019																			Tri-City ValleyCats; 2021–present						
Ottawa Titans																														Ottawa Titans; 2022–present					
Brockton Rox																																New England Knockouts; 2024	Brockton Rox; 2025–present		
Mississippi Mud Monsters																																	Mississippi Mud Monsters; 2025–present		
Down East Bird Dawgs																																	Down East Bird Dawgs; 2025–present		
Cleburne Railroaders																									Cleburne Railroaders American Association; 2017–2026										Cleburne Railroaders; 2027
Kane County Cougars	Kane County Cougars Midwest League; 1991–2020																												Kane County Cougars American Association; 2017–2026						Kane County Cougars; 2027

==== Former franchise lineages ====
Former franchise lineage	1990s							2000s										2010s										2020s						
Former franchise lineage	93	94	95	96	97	98	99	00	01	02	03	04	05	06	07	08	09	10	11	12	13	14	15	16	17	18	19	20	21	22	23	24	25	26
Chillicothe Paints	Chillicothe Paints; 1993–2008																																	
Kentucky Rifles	Kentucky Rifles; 1993–94																																	
Ohio Valley lineage	Ohio Valley Redcoats; 1993–98						Dubois County Dragons; 1999–2002				Kenosha Mammoths; 2003	Springfield-Ozark Ducks; 2004	Ohio Valley Redcoats; 2005																					
Rockford lineage	Portsmouth Explorers; 1993–95			Springfield Capitals; 1996–2001						Rockford RiverHawks; 2002–09									Rockford RiverHawks; 2011–12		Rockford Aviators; 2013–15													
Tri-State Tomahawks	Tri-State Tomahawks; 1993																																	
West Virginia Coal Sox	West Virginia Coal Sox; 1993																																	
River City lineage	Zanesville Greys; 1993–96						River City Rascals; 1999–2019																											
Mid-Missouri lineage		Newark Buffaloes/Bison; 1994–95		Kalamazoo Kodiaks; 1996–98			London Werewolves; 1999–2001			Canton Coyotes; 2002	Mid-Missouri Mavericks; 2003–05																							
Traverse City lineage			Richmond Roosters; 1995–2005											Traverse City Beach Bums; 2006–18																				
Kalamazoo Kings									Kalamazoo Kings; 2001–10																									
Sliders lineage															Slippery Rock Sliders; 2007	Midwest Sliders; 2008	Midwest Sliders of Ypsilanti; 2009	Oakland County Cruisers; 2010		London Rippers; 2012														
Southern Illinois Miners															Southern Illinois Miners; 2007–21																			
Normal CornBelters																		Normal CornBelters; 2010–18																

==== Temporary and traveling teams ====
Temporary or traveling clubs have occasionally been used to balance the league's schedule or respond to unusual operating circumstances.

Temporary or traveling team	1990s							2000s										2010s										2020s						
Temporary or traveling team	93	94	95	96	97	98	99	00	01	02	03	04	05	06	07	08	09	10	11	12	13	14	15	16	17	18	19	20	21	22	23	24	25	26
Road Warriors																				Road Warriors; 2012														
Frontier Greys																					Frontier Greys; 2013–15													
Équipe Québec																													Équipe Québec; 2021					
Empire State Greys																														Empire State Greys; 2022–23				

== Attendance ==
Attendance has been an important measure of the league's growth from its small-market beginnings into larger metropolitan areas and purpose-built stadiums. Selected league-wide and club milestones include:

Year	Attendance milestone
2001	Approximately 719,000 fans attended Frontier League games, then a league record.
2002	League attendance exceeded 950,000.
2004	Nearly 1.3 million fans attended. Gateway became the first club to draw more than 200,000 in a season and average more than 4,000 per game.
2007	The league drew approximately 1.5 million fans. Southern Illinois set a league club record with 259,392 fans and averaged more than 5,000 per game.
2022–25	The league reported four consecutive regular-season attendance records. Nearly 1.9 million fans attended in 2025.
2026	Ottawa sold 10,278 tickets for its May 8 home opener, setting a Frontier League single-game attendance record. They broke this record in Game 3 of the 2026 Finals, with a sellout game of 10,303 spectators.

== Champions ==
The Schaumburg Boomers and Québec Capitales have each won four Frontier League championships, the most in league history. Québec won four consecutive titles from 2022 through 2025.

Year	Champion
1993	Zanesville Greys
1994	Erie Sailors
1995	Johnstown Steal
1996	Springfield Capitals
1997	Canton Crocodiles
1998	Springfield Capitals
1999	London Werewolves
2000	Johnstown Johnnies
2001	Richmond Roosters
2002	Richmond Roosters
2003	Gateway Grizzlies
2004	Rockford RiverHawks
2005	Kalamazoo Kings
2006	Evansville Otters
2007	Windy City ThunderBolts
2008	Windy City ThunderBolts
2009	Lake Erie Crushers
2010	River City Rascals
2011	Joliet Slammers
2012	Southern Illinois Miners
2013	Schaumburg Boomers
2014	Schaumburg Boomers
2015	Traverse City Beach Bums
2016	Evansville Otters
2017	Schaumburg Boomers
2018	Joliet Slammers
2019	River City Rascals
2020	Season canceled due to the COVID-19 pandemic
2021	Schaumburg Boomers
2022	Québec Capitales
2023	Québec Capitales
2024	Québec Capitales
2025	Québec Capitales
2026	Ottawa Titans

== Records ==
The league maintains official game, season and career records for batting, pitching and team performance.

=== Individual career records ===
==== Batting ====
Statistic	Record	Player
Games played	745	Santiago Chirino
At-bats	2,928	Santiago Chirino
Runs	452	Santiago Chirino
Hits	929	Santiago Chirino
Home runs	127	Charlie Lisk
Runs batted in	442	Charlie Lisk

==== Pitching ====
Statistic	Record	Player
Games	300	Jake Joyce
Games started	121	Zac Westcott
Innings pitched	781.2	Zac Westcott
Wins	53	Zac Westcott
Strikeouts	621	Zac Westcott
Complete games	18	Aaron Ledbetter
Saves	74	Zach Strecker

=== Selected single-season records ===
Statistic	Record	Player	Season
Batting average	.405	Pichi Balet, Cook County	2002
Home runs	36	Morgan Burkhart, Richmond	1998
Runs batted in	116	Anthony Calarco, Schaumburg	2025
Stolen bases	83	Mathieu Vallée, Trois-Rivières	2025
Pitching wins	16	John Martinez, Chillicothe	2005
Strikeouts	177	Mike Recchia, Windy City	2012
Saves	32	Jonathan Kountis, Washington	2014

== Hall of Fame ==
The Frontier League Hall of Fame was established in 2014 to recognize players, managers, executives, contributors and significant moments in league history. The inaugural class included Morgan Burkhart, Aaron Ledbetter, Scott Pinoni, Fran Riordan, Kirk Taylor and Dr. W. Chris Hanners. Former commissioner Bill Lee was inducted in 2024.

== Broadcasting ==
In February 2022, the Frontier League announced an agreement with FloSports to stream league games.

In 2025, the league moved its game broadcasts to the Frontier League Network, powered by HomeTeam Network, through a multi-year streaming and broadcast agreement.

For the 2026 All-Star festivities, the league distributed the Home Run Derby and All-Star Game through HomeTeam Network, YouTube Live and Gray Media regional sports networks. The league said the broadcasts were available in more than 10 million homes.

== See also ==
- Baseball awards#U.S. independent professional leagues
- Independent baseball league
- MLB Partner League
