= List of Minor League Baseball leagues and teams =

There are 14 Minor League Baseball (MiLB) leagues and 202 teams in operation across the United States, Dominican Republic, and Canada, which are affiliated with Major League Baseball (MLB) teams. They are organized by one of five classes (from highest to lowest): Triple-A, Double-A, High-A, Single-A, and Rookie. Of these, 120 teams in 11 leagues (from Triple-A to Single-A) are each affiliated with one MLB team through a standardized professional development license. Additionally, three leagues consisting of a total of 82 Rookie teams are located at MLB spring training complexes in Arizona and Florida, as well as in the Dominican Republic. These affiliated leagues contest their seasons during the MLB season. The Arizona Fall League, with six teams, operates in the autumn after the MiLB and MLB seasons to develop top prospects across classifications.

Ten independent baseball leagues, consisting of a total of 101 teams, have no direct affiliation with Major League Baseball, though the American Association, Atlantic League, National Association, and Pioneer League are designated MLB Partner Leagues and the MLB Draft League is an MLB-associated showcase league.

== Leagues affiliated with Major League Baseball ==
=== Triple-A leagues ===
The Triple-A classification is the highest level of play in MiLB, just below MLB. A total of 30 affiliated teams compete at this level, with 20 teams in the International League and 10 teams in the Pacific Coast League.

==== International League ====
Overview of International League teams
Team	Division	City	State	Stadium	Capacity	Affiliate
Buffalo Bisons	East	Buffalo	New York	Sahlen Field	16,600	Toronto Blue Jays
Charlotte Knights	East	Charlotte	North Carolina	Truist Field	10,200	Chicago White Sox
Columbus Clippers	West	Columbus	Ohio	Huntington Park	10,100	Cleveland Guardians
Durham Bulls	East	Durham	North Carolina	Durham Bulls Athletic Park	10,000	Tampa Bay Rays
Gwinnett Stripers	West	Lawrenceville	Georgia	Gwinnett Field	10,427	Atlanta Braves
Indianapolis Indians	West	Indianapolis	Indiana	Victory Field	14,230	Pittsburgh Pirates
Iowa Cubs	West	Des Moines	Iowa	Principal Park	11,500	Chicago Cubs
Jacksonville Jumbo Shrimp	East	Jacksonville	Florida	VyStar Ballpark	11,000	Miami Marlins
Lehigh Valley IronPigs	East	Allentown	Pennsylvania	Coca-Cola Park	10,100	Philadelphia Phillies
Louisville Bats	West	Louisville	Kentucky	Louisville Slugger Field	13,131	Cincinnati Reds
Memphis Redbirds	West	Memphis	Tennessee	AutoZone Park	10,000	St. Louis Cardinals
Nashville Sounds	West	Nashville	Tennessee	First Horizon Park	10,000	Milwaukee Brewers
Norfolk Tides	East	Norfolk	Virginia	Harbor Park	11,856	Baltimore Orioles
Omaha Storm Chasers	West	Papillion	Nebraska	Werner Park	9,023	Kansas City Royals
Rochester Red Wings	East	Rochester	New York	ESL Ballpark	10,840	Washington Nationals
Scranton/Wilkes-Barre Highlanders	East	Moosic	Pennsylvania	PNC Field	10,000	New York Yankees
St. Paul Saints	West	Saint Paul	Minnesota	CHS Field	7,210	Minnesota Twins
Syracuse Mets	East	Syracuse	New York	NBT Bank Stadium	11,731	New York Mets
Toledo Mud Hens	West	Toledo	Ohio	Fifth Third Field	10,300	Detroit Tigers
Worcester Red Sox	East	Worcester	Massachusetts	Polar Park	9,508	Boston Red Sox

==== Pacific Coast League ====
Overview of Pacific Coast League teams
Team	Division	City	State	Stadium	Capacity	Affiliate
Albuquerque Isotopes	East	Albuquerque	New Mexico	Rio Grande Credit Union Field at Isotopes Park	13,500	Colorado Rockies
El Paso Chihuahuas	East	El Paso	Texas	Southwest University Park	9,500	San Diego Padres
Las Vegas Aviators	West	Las Vegas	Nevada	Las Vegas Ballpark	10,000	Athletics
Oklahoma City Comets	East	Oklahoma City	Oklahoma	Chickasaw Bricktown Ballpark	9,000	Los Angeles Dodgers
Reno Aces	West	Reno	Nevada	Greater Nevada Field	9,013	Arizona Diamondbacks
Round Rock Express	East	Round Rock	Texas	Dell Diamond	11,631	Texas Rangers
Sacramento River Cats	West	West Sacramento	California	Sutter Health Park	14,014	San Francisco Giants
Salt Lake Bees	West	South Jordan	Utah	Ballpark at America First Square	8,500	Los Angeles Angels
Sugar Land Space Cowboys	East	Sugar Land	Texas	Constellation Field	7,500	Houston Astros
Tacoma Rainiers	West	Tacoma	Washington	Cheney Stadium	6,500	Seattle Mariners

=== Double-A leagues ===
The Double-A classification is the second-highest level of play in Minor League Baseball. A total of 30 teams compete at this level, with 12 teams in the Eastern League, 8 teams in the Southern League, and 10 teams in the Texas League.

==== Eastern League ====
Overview of Eastern League teams
Team	Division	City	State	Stadium	Capacity	Affiliate
Akron RubberDucks	Southwest	Akron	Ohio	7 17 Credit Union Park	9,097	Cleveland Guardians
Altoona Curve	Southwest	Altoona	Pennsylvania	Peoples Natural Gas Field	7,210	Pittsburgh Pirates
Binghamton Rumble Ponies	Northeast	Binghamton	New York	Mirabito Stadium	6,012	New York Mets
Chesapeake Baysox	Southwest	Bowie	Maryland	Prince George's Stadium	10,000	Baltimore Orioles
Erie SeaWolves	Southwest	Erie	Pennsylvania	UPMC Park	6,952	Detroit Tigers
Harrisburg Senators	Southwest	Harrisburg	Pennsylvania	FNB Field	6,187	Washington Nationals
Hartford Yard Goats	Northeast	Hartford	Connecticut	Dunkin' Park	6,000	Colorado Rockies
New Hampshire Fisher Cats	Northeast	Manchester	New Hampshire	Delta Dental Stadium	6,500	Toronto Blue Jays
Portland Sea Dogs	Northeast	Portland	Maine	Hadlock Field	7,368	Boston Red Sox
Reading Fightin Phils	Northeast	Reading	Pennsylvania	FirstEnergy Stadium	9,000	Philadelphia Phillies
Richmond Flying Squirrels	Southwest	Richmond	Virginia	CarMax Park	10,000	San Francisco Giants
Somerset Patriots	Northeast	Bridgewater	New Jersey	TD Bank Ballpark	6,100	New York Yankees

==== Southern League ====
Overview of Southern League teams
Team	Division	City	State	Stadium	Capacity	Affiliate
Biloxi Shuckers	South	Biloxi	Mississippi	Keesler Federal Park	6,000	Milwaukee Brewers
Birmingham Barons	North	Birmingham	Alabama	Regions Field	8,500	Chicago White Sox
Chattanooga Lookouts	North	Chattanooga	Tennessee	Erlanger Park	8,032	Cincinnati Reds
Columbus Clingstones	South	Columbus	Georgia	Pinnacle Park	5,500	Atlanta Braves
Knoxville Smokies	North	Knoxville	Tennessee	Covenant Health Park	6,355	Chicago Cubs
Montgomery Biscuits	South	Montgomery	Alabama	Dabos Park	7,000	Tampa Bay Rays
Pensacola Blue Wahoos	South	Pensacola	Florida	Blue Wahoos Stadium	5,038	Miami Marlins
Rocket City Trash Pandas	North	Madison	Alabama	Toyota Field	7,000	Los Angeles Angels

==== Texas League ====
Overview of Texas League teams
Team	Division	City	State	Stadium	Capacity	Affiliate
Amarillo Sod Poodles	South	Amarillo	Texas	Hodgetown	6,631	Arizona Diamondbacks
Arkansas Travelers	North	North Little Rock	Arkansas	Dickey–Stephens Park	5,800	Seattle Mariners
Corpus Christi Hooks	South	Corpus Christi	Texas	Whataburger Field	7,679	Houston Astros
Frisco RoughRiders	South	Frisco	Texas	Riders Field	10,316	Texas Rangers
Midland RockHounds	South	Midland	Texas	Momentum Bank Ballpark	6,669	Athletics
Northwest Arkansas Naturals	North	Springdale	Arkansas	Arvest Ballpark	7,305	Kansas City Royals
Ozarks Springbirds	North	Springfield	Missouri	Route 66 Stadium	10,486	St. Louis Cardinals
San Antonio Missions	South	San Antonio	Texas	Nelson W. Wolff Municipal Stadium	9,200	San Diego Padres
Tulsa Drillers	North	Tulsa	Oklahoma	ONEOK Field	7,833	Los Angeles Dodgers
Wichita Turbo Tubs	North	Wichita	Kansas	Equity Bank Park	10,000	Minnesota Twins

=== High-A leagues ===
High-A is the third-highest level of play in Minor League Baseball. A total of 30 teams compete at this level, with 12 teams in the Midwest League, 12 teams in the South Atlantic League, and 6 teams in the Northwest League.

==== Midwest League ====
Overview of Midwest League teams
Team	Division	City	State	Stadium	Capacity	Affiliate
Beloit Sky Carp	West	Beloit	Wisconsin	ABC Supply Stadium	3,501	Miami Marlins
Cedar Rapids Kernels	West	Cedar Rapids	Iowa	Veterans Memorial Stadium	5,300	Minnesota Twins
Dayton Dragons	East	Dayton	Ohio	Day Air Ballpark	7,230	Cincinnati Reds
Fort Wayne TinCaps	East	Fort Wayne	Indiana	Parkview Field	6,516	San Diego Padres
Great Lakes Loons	East	Midland	Michigan	Dow Diamond	5,500	Los Angeles Dodgers
Lake County Captains	East	Eastlake	Ohio	Classic Auto Group Park	7,273	Cleveland Guardians
Lansing Lugnuts	East	Lansing	Michigan	Jackson Field	7,527	Athletics
Peoria Chiefs	West	Peoria	Illinois	Dozer Park	8,500	St. Louis Cardinals
Quad Cities River Bandits	West	Davenport	Iowa	Modern Woodmen Park	4,024	Kansas City Royals
South Bend Cubs	West	South Bend	Indiana	Four Winds Field at Coveleski Stadium	5,000	Chicago Cubs
West Michigan Whitecaps	East	Comstock Park	Michigan	LMCU Ballpark	9,684	Detroit Tigers
Wisconsin Timber Rattlers	West	Appleton	Wisconsin	Neuroscience Group Field at Fox Cities Stadium	5,900	Milwaukee Brewers

==== South Atlantic League ====
Overview of South Atlantic League teams
Team	Division	City	State	Stadium	Capacity	Affiliate
Asheville Tourists	South	Asheville	North Carolina	HomeTrust Park	4,000	Houston Astros
Bowling Green Hot Rods	South	Bowling Green	Kentucky	Bowling Green Ballpark	4,559	Tampa Bay Rays
Brooklyn Cyclones	North	Brooklyn	New York	Maimonides Park	7,000	New York Mets
Frederick Keys	North	Frederick	Maryland	Nymeo Field at Harry Grove Stadium	5,400	Baltimore Orioles
Greensboro Grasshoppers	South	Greensboro	North Carolina	First National Bank Field	7,499	Pittsburgh Pirates
Greenville Drive	South	Greenville	South Carolina	Fluor Field at the West End	5,700	Boston Red Sox
Hub City Spartanburgers	South	Spartanburg	South Carolina	Fifth Third Park	5,000	Texas Rangers
Hudson Valley Renegades	North	Wappingers Falls	New York	Heritage Financial Park	4,494	New York Yankees
Jersey Shore BlueClaws	North	Lakewood	New Jersey	ShoreTown Ballpark	6,588	Philadelphia Phillies
Rome Emperors	South	Rome	Georgia	AdventHealth Stadium	5,105	Atlanta Braves
Wilmington Blue Rocks	North	Wilmington	Delaware	Daniel S. Frawley Stadium	6,532	Washington Nationals
Winston-Salem Dash	South	Winston-Salem	North Carolina	Truist Stadium	5,500	Chicago White Sox

==== Northwest League ====
Overview of Northwest League teams
Team	City	State/Province	Stadium	Capacity	Affiliate
Eugene Emeralds	Eugene	Oregon	PK Park	4,000	San Francisco Giants
Everett AquaSox	Everett	Washington	Funko Field	3,682	Seattle Mariners
Hillsboro Hops	Hillsboro	Oregon	Hillsboro Hops Ballpark	6,000	Arizona Diamondbacks
Spokane Indians	Spokane	Washington	Avista Stadium	6,803	Colorado Rockies
Tri-City Dust Devils	Pasco	Washington	Gesa Stadium	3,654	Los Angeles Angels
Vancouver Canadians	Vancouver	British Columbia	Rogers Field at Nat Bailey Stadium	6,013	Toronto Blue Jays

=== Single-A leagues ===
Single-A is the fourth-highest level of play in Minor League Baseball. A total of 30 teams compete at this level, with 12 teams in the Carolina League, 10 teams in the Florida State League, and 8 teams in the California League.

==== Carolina League ====
Overview of Carolina League teams
Team	Division	City	State	Stadium	Capacity	Affiliate
Augusta GreenJackets	South	North Augusta	South Carolina	SRP Park	4,000	Atlanta Braves
Charleston RiverDogs	South	Charleston	South Carolina	Joseph P. Riley Jr. Park	6,000	Tampa Bay Rays
Columbia Fireflies	South	Columbia	South Carolina	Prisma Health Park	7,501	Kansas City Royals
Delmarva Shorebirds	North	Salisbury	Maryland	Arthur W. Perdue Stadium	5,200	Baltimore Orioles
Fayetteville Woodpeckers	North	Fayetteville	North Carolina	Segra Stadium	4,786	Houston Astros
Fredericksburg Nationals	North	Fredericksburg	Virginia	Virginia Credit Union Stadium	5,000	Washington Nationals
Hickory Crawdads	South	Hickory	North Carolina	L. P. Frans Stadium	5,062	Texas Rangers
Hill City Howlers	North	Lynchburg	Virginia	City Stadium	4,000	Cleveland Guardians
Kannapolis Cannon Ballers	South	Kannapolis	North Carolina	Atrium Health Ballpark	4,930	Chicago White Sox
Myrtle Beach Pelicans	South	Myrtle Beach	South Carolina	Pelicans Ballpark	4,875	Chicago Cubs
Salem RidgeYaks	North	Salem	Virginia	Carilion Clinic Field at Salem Memorial Ballpark	6,300	Boston Red Sox
Wilson Warbirds	North	Wilson	North Carolina	Wilson Ballpark	4,500	Milwaukee Brewers

==== Florida State League ====
Overview of Florida State League teams
Team	Division	City (all in Florida)	Stadium	Capacity	Affiliate
Bradenton Marauders	West	Bradenton	LECOM Park	8,500	Pittsburgh Pirates
Clearwater Threshers	West	Clearwater	BayCare Ballpark	8,500	Philadelphia Phillies
Daytona Tortugas	East	Daytona Beach	Jackie Robinson Ballpark	4,200	Cincinnati Reds
Dunedin Blue Jays	West	Dunedin	TD Ballpark	5,509	Toronto Blue Jays
Fort Myers Mighty Mussels	West	Fort Myers	Hammond Stadium	7,500	Minnesota Twins
Jupiter Hammerheads	East	Jupiter	Roger Dean Chevrolet Stadium	6,871	Miami Marlins
Lakeland Flying Tigers	West	Lakeland	Publix Field at Joker Marchant Stadium	8,500	Detroit Tigers
Palm Beach Cardinals	East	Jupiter	Roger Dean Chevrolet Stadium	6,871	St. Louis Cardinals
St. Lucie Mets	East	Port St. Lucie	Clover Park	7,347	New York Mets
Tampa Tarpons	West	Tampa	George M. Steinbrenner Field	11,026	New York Yankees

==== California League ====
Overview of California League teams
Team	Division	City (all in California)	Stadium	Capacity	Affiliate
Fresno Grizzlies	North	Fresno	Chukchansi Park	10,650	Colorado Rockies
Inland Empire 66ers	South	San Bernardino	San Manuel Stadium	5,000	Seattle Mariners
Lake Elsinore Storm	South	Lake Elsinore	Lake Elsinore Diamond	7,866	San Diego Padres
Ontario Tower Buzzers	North	Ontario	ONT Field	6,000	Los Angeles Dodgers
Rancho Cucamonga Quakes	South	Rancho Cucamonga	LoanMart Field	6,200	Los Angeles Angels
San Jose Giants	North	San Jose	Excite Ballpark	4,200	San Francisco Giants
Stockton Ports	North	Stockton	Banner Island Ballpark	5,300	Athletics
Visalia Rawhide	South	Visalia	Valley Strong Ballpark	2,468	Arizona Diamondbacks

=== Rookie leagues ===
The Rookie classification is the lowest level of play in Minor League Baseball. A total of 85 teams compete at this level, with 18 teams in the Arizona Complex League, 20 teams in the Florida Complex League, and 47 teams in the Dominican Summer League.

==== Arizona Complex League ====
Overview of Arizona Complex League teams
Team	City (all in Arizona)	Stadium	Affiliate
ACL Angels	Tempe	Tempe Diablo Stadium	Los Angeles Angels
ACL Athletics	Mesa	Fitch Park	Athletics
ACL Brewers	Phoenix	American Family Fields of Phoenix	Milwaukee Brewers
ACL Cubs	Mesa	Sloan Park	Chicago Cubs
ACL D-backs	Scottsdale	Salt River Fields at Talking Stick	Arizona Diamondbacks
ACL Dodgers	Glendale	Camelback Ranch	Los Angeles Dodgers
ACL Giants	Scottsdale	Scottsdale Stadium	San Francisco Giants
ACL Guardians	Goodyear	Goodyear Ballpark	Cleveland Guardians
ACL Mariners	Peoria	Peoria Sports Complex	Seattle Mariners
ACL Padres	Peoria	Peoria Sports Complex	San Diego Padres
ACL Rangers	Surprise	Surprise Stadium	Texas Rangers
ACL Reds	Goodyear	Goodyear Ballpark	Cincinnati Reds
ACL Rockies	Scottsdale	Salt River Fields at Talking Stick	Colorado Rockies
ACL Royals	Surprise	Surprise Stadium	Kansas City Royals
ACL White Sox	Glendale	Camelback Ranch	Chicago White Sox

==== Florida Complex League ====
Overview of Florida Complex League teams
Team	City (all in Florida)	Stadium	Affiliate
FCL Astros	West Palm Beach	Cacti Park of the Palm Beaches	Houston Astros
FCL Blue Jays	Dunedin	Bobby Mattick Training Center	Toronto Blue Jays
FCL Braves	North Port	CoolToday Park	Atlanta Braves
FCL Cardinals	Jupiter	Roger Dean Chevrolet Stadium	St. Louis Cardinals
FCL Marlins	Jupiter	Roger Dean Chevrolet Stadium	Miami Marlins
FCL Mets	Port St. Lucie	Clover Park	New York Mets
FCL Nationals	West Palm Beach	Cacti Park of the Palm Beaches	Washington Nationals
FCL Orioles	Sarasota	Ed Smith Stadium	Baltimore Orioles
FCL Phillies	Clearwater	Carpenter Complex	Philadelphia Phillies
FCL Pirates	Bradenton	Pirate City	Pittsburgh Pirates
FCL Rays	Port Charlotte	Charlotte Sports Park	Tampa Bay Rays
FCL Red Sox	Fort Myers	JetBlue Park at Fenway South	Boston Red Sox
FCL Tigers	Lakeland	Tigertown	Detroit Tigers
FCL Twins	Fort Myers	Lee County Sports Complex	Minnesota Twins
FCL Yankees	Tampa	Himes Complex	New York Yankees

==== Dominican Summer League ====
Overview of Dominican Summer League teams
Team	Division	City	Province	Stadium	Affiliate
DSL Angels	Boca Chica South	San Pedro de Macorís	San Pedro de Macorís	Baseball Valley Complex	Los Angeles Angels
DSL Astros	Boca Chica Northwest	San Antonio de Guerra	Santo Domingo	Houston Astros Complex	Houston Astros
DSL Athletics	Boca Chica Northwest	Santo Domingo Norte	Santo Domingo	Juan Marichal Complex	Oakland Athletics
DSL Blue Jays	Boca Chica Baseball City	San Pedro de Macorís	San Pedro de Macorís	Baseball City Complex	Toronto Blue Jays
DSL Braves	Boca Chica Northwest	San Pedro de Macorís	San Pedro de Macorís	Corcova de Guerra Complex	Atlanta Braves
DSL Brewers Blue	Boca Chica San Pedro de Macorís	Santo Domingo Este	Santo Domingo	Dominican Republic Academy	Milwaukee Brewers
DSL Brewers Gold	Boca Chica San Pedro de Macorís	Santo Domingo Este	Santo Domingo	Dominican Republic Academy	Milwaukee Brewers
DSL Cardinals Blue	Boca Chica South	Santo Domingo Norte	Santo Domingo	Baseball Oasis Complex	St. Louis Cardinals
DSL Cardinals Red	Boca Chica San Pedro de Macorís	Santo Domingo Norte	Santo Domingo	Baseball Oasis Complex	St. Louis Cardinals
DSL Rockies	Boca Chica Northeast	Boca Chica	Santo Domingo	Colorado Rockies Complex	Colorado Rockies
DSL Cubs Blue	Boca Chica North	Boca Chica	Santo Domingo	Chicago Cubs Complex	Chicago Cubs
DSL Cubs Red	Boca Chica San Pedro de Macorís	Boca Chica	Santo Domingo	Chicago Cubs Complex	Chicago Cubs
DSL Diamondbacks 1	Boca Chica Baseball City	Boca Chica	Santo Domingo	Baseball City Complex	Arizona Diamondbacks
DSL Diamondbacks 2	Boca Chica San Pedro de Macorís	Boca Chica	Santo Domingo	Baseball City Complex	Arizona Diamondbacks
DSL Dodgers Bautista	Boca Chica Northwest	San Antonio de Guerra	Santo Domingo	Las Américas Complex	Los Angeles Dodgers
DSL Dodgers Shoemaker	Boca Chica North	San Antonio de Guerra	Santo Domingo	Las Palmas Complex	Los Angeles Dodgers
DSL Giants 1	Boca Chica Northeast	Boca Chica	Santo Domingo	Felipe Rojas Alou Complex	San Francisco Giants
DSL Giants 2		Boca Chica	Santo Domingo	Felipe Rojas Alou Complex	San Francisco Giants
DSL Guardians 1	Boca Chica North	San Antonio de Guerra	Santo Domingo	Cleveland Guardians Complex	Cleveland Guardians
DSL Guardians 2		San Antonio de Guerra	Santo Domingo	Cleveland Guardians Complex	Cleveland Guardians
DSL Mariners	Boca Chica Northeast	San Antonio de Guerra	Santo Domingo	Seattle Mariners Complex	Seattle Mariners
DSL Marlins	Boca Chica Northwest	Boca Chica	Santo Domingo	Miami Marlins Complex	Miami Marlins
DSL Mets 1	Boca Chica South	Boca Chica	Santo Domingo	New York Mets Complex	New York Mets
DSL Mets 2	Boca Chica San Pedro de Macorís	Boca Chica	Santo Domingo	New York Mets Complex	New York Mets
DSL Nationals	Boca Chica South	Boca Chica	Santo Domingo	Baseball Valley Complex	Washington Nationals
DSL Orioles 1	Boca Chica Baseball City	Guerra	Santo Domingo	Baltimore Orioles Dominican Academy	Baltimore Orioles
DSL Orioles 2		Guerra	Santo Domingo	Baltimore Orioles Dominican Academy	Baltimore Orioles
DSL Padres	Boca Chica Baseball City	San Cristóbal	San Cristóbal	Najayo Complex	San Diego Padres
DSL Phillies Red	Boca Chica South	Boca Chica	Santo Domingo	Philadelphia Phillies Academy	Philadelphia Phillies
DSL Phillies White	Boca Chica San Pedro de Macorís	Boca Chica	Santo Domingo	Philadelphia Phillies Academy	Philadelphia Phillies
DSL Pirates 1	Boca Chica North	El Toro	Peravia	Pittsburgh Pirates Complex	Pittsburgh Pirates
DSL Pirates 2	Boca Chica Northeast	El Toro	Peravia	Pittsburgh Pirates Complex	Pittsburgh Pirates
DSL Rangers 1	Boca Chica North	Boca Chica	Santo Domingo	Academia de Prospecto Complex	Texas Rangers
DSL Rangers 2	Boca Chica San Pedro de Macorís	Boca Chica	Santo Domingo	Academia de Prospecto Complex	Texas Rangers
DSL Rays 1	Boca Chica Northwest	San Antonio de Guerra	Santo Domingo	Tampa Bay Rays Complex	Tampa Bay Rays
DSL Rays 2	Boca Chica North	San Antonio de Guerra	Santo Domingo	Tampa Bay Rays Complex	Tampa Bay Rays
DSL Reds	Boca Chica Baseball City	Boca Chica	Santo Domingo	Baseball City Complex	Cincinnati Reds
DSL Red Sox Blue	Boca Chica Northwest	El Toro	Peravia	El Toro Complex	Boston Red Sox
DSL Red Sox Red	Boca Chica North	El Toro	Peravia	El Toro Complex	Boston Red Sox
DSL Rockies	Boca Chica South	Boca Chica	Santo Domingo	Colorado Rockies Complex	Colorado Rockies
DSL Royals 1	Boca Chica Northwest	San Antonio de Guerra	Santo Domingo	Kansas City Royals Complex	Kansas City Royals
DSL Royals 2	Boca Chica Northeast	San Antonio de Guerra	Santo Domingo	Kansas City Royals Complex	Kansas City Royals
DSL Tigers 1	Boca Chica San Pedro de Macorís	San Pedro de Macorís	San Pedro de Macorís	Tower Complex	Detroit Tigers
DSL Tigers 2	Boca Chica Northeast	San Pedro de Macorís	San Pedro de Macorís	Tower Complex	Detroit Tigers
DSL Twins	Boca Chica South	Boca Chica	Santo Domingo	Minnesota Twins Academy	Minnesota Twins
DSL White Sox	Boca Chica Baseball City	Boca Chica	Santo Domingo	Baseball City Complex	Chicago White Sox
DSL Yankees	Boca Chica South	Boca Chica	Santo Domingo	New York Yankees Complex	New York Yankees

=== Fall leagues ===
==== Arizona Fall League ====
The Arizona Fall League, an off-season league owned and operated by Major League Baseball, consists of six teams in the state of Arizona. Each team is affiliated with five MLB organizations.

Overview of Arizona Fall League teams
Team	City (all in Arizona)	Stadium	Affiliates
Glendale Desert Dogs	Glendale	Camelback Ranch	Chicago White Sox, Los Angeles Dodgers, Philadelphia Phillies, Cincinnati Reds, St. Louis Cardinals
Mesa Solar Sox	Mesa	Sloan Park	Chicago Cubs, Athletics, Boston Red Sox, Los Angeles Angels, Tampa Bay Rays
Peoria Javelinas	Peoria	Peoria Sports Complex	San Diego Padres, Seattle Mariners, Atlanta Braves, Miami Marlins, Milwaukee Brewers
Salt River Rafters	Scottsdale	Salt River Fields at Talking Stick	Arizona Diamondbacks, Colorado Rockies, New York Yankees, Washington Nationals, Minnesota Twins
Scottsdale Scorpions	Scottsdale	Scottsdale Stadium	San Francisco Giants, Pittsburgh Pirates, Detroit Tigers, New York Mets, Toronto Blue Jays
Surprise Saguaros	Surprise	Surprise Stadium	Kansas City Royals, Texas Rangers, Cleveland Guardians, Baltimore Orioles, Houston Astros

== MLB Partner Leagues ==
The four MLB Partner Leagues have no direct affiliation with individual MLB organizations, but collaborate on player development, scouting, and rule innovation while promoting the sport in areas in North America not otherwise served by MLB teams or their minor league affiliates. Three leagues (the American Association, Atlantic League, and Frontier League) are fully independent leagues, while a fourth, the Pioneer League, had previously been affiliated with Minor League Baseball as a "Rookie Advanced" league, the second-lowest rung on the minor league ladder, but was dropped after MLB eliminated the classification prior to the 2021 season. Additionally, MLB supports a 6-team showcase league for future and newly-professional prospects called the MLB Draft League; all teams in the MLB Draft league were formerly Minor League Baseball teams.

=== American Association of Professional Baseball ===
The American Association of Professional Baseball consists of 12 teams.

Overview of American Association of Professional Baseball teams
Team	Division	City	State/Province	Stadium	Capacity
Chicago Dogs	East	Rosemont	Illinois	Impact Field	6,300
Fargo-Moorhead RedHawks	West	Fargo	North Dakota	Newman Outdoor Field	4,513
Gary SouthShore RailCats	East	Gary	Indiana	U.S. Steel Yard	6,139
Kansas City Monarchs	West	Kansas City	Kansas	Legends Field	6,537
Lake Country DockHounds	East	Oconomowoc	Wisconsin	Wisconsin Brewing Company Park	3,641
Lincoln Saltdogs	West	Lincoln	Nebraska	Haymarket Park	8,486
Milwaukee Milkmen	East	Franklin	Wisconsin	Franklin Field	4,000
Sioux City Explorers	West	Sioux City	Iowa	Security National Bank Field at Lewis & Clark Park	3,631
Sioux Falls Canaries	West	Sioux Falls	South Dakota	Sioux Falls Stadium	4,500
Winnipeg Goldeyes	East	Winnipeg	Manitoba	Blue Cross Park	7,561

=== Atlantic League of Professional Baseball ===
The Atlantic League of Professional Baseball consists of 10 teams.

Overview of Atlantic League of Professional Baseball teams
Team	Division	City	State	Stadium	Capacity
Charleston Dirty Birds	South	Charleston	West Virginia	GoMart Ballpark	4,500
Hagerstown Flying Boxcars	North	Hagerstown	Maryland	Meritus Park	5,500
High Point Rockers	South	High Point	North Carolina	Truist Point	8,500
Lancaster Stormers	North	Lancaster	Pennsylvania	Penn Medicine Park	8,000
Lexington Legends	South	Lexington	Kentucky	CommonSpirit Ballpark	9,994
Long Island Ducks	North	Central Islip	New York	Fairfield Properties Ballpark	8,002
Southern Maryland Blue Crabs	South	Waldorf	Maryland	Regency Furniture Stadium	6,200
Staten Island FerryHawks	North	Staten Island	New York	SIUH Community Park	8,171
York Revolution	North	York	Pennsylvania	WellSpan Park	7,500

=== National Association of Professional Baseball ===
The National Association of Professional Baseball consists of 20 teams.

Overview of Frontier League teams
Team	Conference	Division	City	State/Province	Stadium	Capacity
Brockton Rox	Atlantic	North	Brockton	Massachusetts	Campanelli Stadium	4,750
Cleburne Railroaders	Midwest	West	Cleburne	Texas	La Moderna Field	2,500
Down East Bird Dawgs	Atlantic	East	Kinston	North Carolina	Grainger Stadium	3,400
Evansville Otters	Midwest	Central	Evansville	Indiana	Bosse Field	5,181
Florence Y'alls	Midwest	Central	Florence	Kentucky	Thomas More Stadium	4,500
Gateway Grizzlies	Midwest	West	Sauget	Illinois	Arsenal BG Ballpark	6,000
Joliet Slammers	Midwest	West	Joliet	Illinois	Slammers Stadium	6,016
Kane County Cougars	Midwest	Central	Geneva	Illinois	Northwestern Medicine Field	10,923
Lake Erie Crushers	Midwest	Central	Avon	Ohio	ForeFront Field	5,000
Mississippi Mud Monsters	Midwest	West	Pearl	Mississippi	Trustmark Park	6,500
New Jersey Jackals	Atlantic	East	Paterson	New Jersey	Hinchliffe Stadium	10,000
New York Boulders	Atlantic	East	Pomona	New York	Clover Stadium	9,362
Ottawa Titans	Atlantic	North	Ottawa	Ontario	Ottawa Stadium	10,332
Québec Capitales	Atlantic	North	Quebec City	Quebec	Stade Canac	4,297
Schaumburg Boomers	Midwest	Central	Schaumburg	Illinois	Wintrust Field	7,365
Sussex County Miners	Atlantic	East	Augusta	New Jersey	Skylands Stadium	5,500
Tri-City ValleyCats	Atlantic	North	Troy	New York	Joseph L. Bruno Stadium	6,500
Trois-Rivières Aigles	Atlantic	North	Trois-Rivières	Quebec	Stade Quillorama	4,000
Washington Wild Things	Atlantic	East	Washington	Pennsylvania	EQT Park	5,200
Windy City ThunderBolts	Midwest	West	Crestwood	Illinois	Ozinga Field	4,200

=== Pioneer League ===
The Pioneer League consists of 10 teams.

Overview of Pioneer League teams
Team	City	State	Stadium	Capacity
Billings Mustangs	Billings	Montana	Dehler Park	6,500
Boise Hawks	Boise	Idaho	Memorial Stadium	3,452
Glacier Range Riders	Kalispell	Montana	Glacier Bank Park	5,500
Great Falls Voyagers	Great Falls	Montana	Centene Stadium	2,500
Idaho Falls Chukars	Idaho Falls	Idaho	Melaleuca Field	3,400
Long Beach Coast	Long Beach	California	Blair Field	3,238
Missoula PaddleHeads	Missoula	Montana	Ogren Park at Allegiance Field	3,500
Oakland Ballers	Oakland	California	Raimondi Park	2,500
Ogden Raptors	Ogden	Utah	Lindquist Field	8,262
Orange County Baseball Club	Irvine	California	Great Park Baseball Stadium	1,200

=== MLB Draft League ===
The MLB Draft League is a hybrid amateur–professional showcase league supported by MLB but run independently. During the first half of each season, the league operates as an amateur collegiate summer baseball league; after a break for each July's MLB draft, play resumes for the season's remaining games with paid professional players who have exhausted their amateur eligibility.

Team	City	State	Stadium	Capacity
Aberdeen IronBirds	Aberdeen	Maryland	Ripken Stadium	6,300
Mahoning Valley Scrappers	Niles	Ohio	7 17 Credit Union Field at Eastwood	6,000
State College Spikes	University Park	Pennsylvania	Lubrano Park	5,570
Trenton Thunder	Trenton	New Jersey	Trenton Thunder Ballpark	6,440
West Virginia Black Bears	Granville	West Virginia	Kendrick Family Ballpark	3,500
Williamsport Crosscutters	Williamsport	Pennsylvania	Journey Bank Ballpark	2,366

== Non-partner independent leagues ==
=== Canadian Baseball League ===
The Canadian Baseball League consists of 9 teams, all in Southern Ontario; from 1919 until 2025, it operated as a semi-professional league known as the Intercounty Baseball League.

Overview of Canadian Baseball League teams
Team	City	Province	Stadium
Barrie Baycats	Springwater	Ontario	Athletic Kulture Stadium
Brantford Red Sox	Brantford	Ontario	Arnold Anderson Stadium
Chatham-Kent Barnstormers	Chatham-Kent	Ontario	Fergie Jenkins Field
Guelph Royals	Guelph	Ontario	Hastings Stadium
Hamilton Cardinals	Hamilton	Ontario	Bernie Arbour Memorial Stadium
Kitchener Panthers	Kitchener	Ontario	Jack Couch Park
London Majors	London	Ontario	Labatt Park
Toronto Maple Leafs	Toronto	Ontario	Dominico Field
Welland Jackfish	Welland	Ontario	Welland Stadium

=== Empire Professional Baseball League ===
The independent Empire Professional Baseball League consists of 4 teams.

Overview of Empire Professional Baseball League teams
Team	City	State	Stadium
Malone Border Hounds	Malone	New York	American Legion Post 219 Veterans Field
North Country Thunderbirds	Plattsburgh	New York	Chip Cummings Field
Saranac Lake Surge	Saranac Lake	New York	Petrova Field
Tupper Lake Riverpigs	Tupper Lake	New York	Municipal Park

=== Pecos League ===
The independent Pecos League consists of 16 teams.

Overview of Pecos League teams
Team	Division	City	State	Stadium
Alpine Cowboys	Mountain	Alpine	Texas	Kokernot Field
Austin Weirdos	Mountain	Austin	Texas	Parque Zaragosa
Bakersfield Train Robbers	Pacific	Bakersfield	California	Sam Lynn Ballpark
Blackwell FlyCatchers	Mountain	Blackwell	Oklahoma	Morgan Field
Dublin Leprechauns	Pacific	Dublin	California	Fallon Sports Park
Garden City Wind	Mountain	Garden City	Kansas	Clint Lightner Field
Martinez Sturgeon	Pacific	Martinez	California	Waterfront Park
Marysville Drakes	Pacific	Marysville	California	Bryant Field
North Platte 80s	Mountain	North Platte	Nebraska	Bill Wood Field
Pecos Bills	Mountain	Pecos	Texas	Cyclone Ballpark
Roswell Invaders	Mountain	Roswell	New Mexico	Joe Baumann Park
San Rafael Pacifics	Pacific	San Rafael	California	Albert Park
Santa Fe Fuego	Mountain	Santa Fe	New Mexico	Fort Marcy Park
Trinidad Triggers	Mountain	Trinidad	Colorado	Central Park
Tucson Saguaros	Mountain	Tucson	Arizona	Kino Sports Complex
Vallejo Seaweed	Pacific	Vallejo	California	Wilson Park

=== United Shore Professional Baseball League ===
The independent, single-site United Shore Professional Baseball League consists of four teams.

Overview of United Shore Professional Baseball League teams
Team	City	State	Stadium	Capacity
Birmingham Bloomfield Beavers	Utica	Michigan	UWM Field	4,500
Eastside Diamond Hoppers	Utica	Michigan	UWM Field	4,500
Utica Unicorns	Utica	Michigan	UWM Field	4,500
Westside Woolly Mammoths	Utica	Michigan	UWM Field	4,500

=== Women's Pro Baseball League ===
The Women's Pro Baseball League is an independent, professional women's baseball league that will begin play in 2026. All 4 teams, which have yet to be given home stadiums, will play their inaugural season in a single stadium in Illinois.

Overview of Women's Pro Baseball League teams
Team	City	State	Stadium	Capacity
Boston Hunters	Springfield	Illinois	Robin Roberts Stadium	5,200
Los Angeles Queens	Springfield	Illinois	Robin Roberts Stadium	5,200
New York Heights	Springfield	Illinois	Robin Roberts Stadium	5,200
San Francisco Firebells	Springfield	Illinois	Robin Roberts Stadium	5,200

== See also ==
- List of developmental and minor sports leagues
- List of professional sports leagues#Americas
- List of defunct professional sports leagues
- Minor League Baseball rosters
