= 2023 Frontier League season =

30th annual season of the Frontier League

- League: Frontier League
- Sport: Baseball
- Duration: May 11 – September 3 (Playoffs: September 5 – September 17)
- Games: 96 (768 games in total)
- Teams: 16

East Division
- League champions: Québec Capitales

West Division
- League champions: Evansville Otters

Frontier League Championship
- Champions: Québec Capitales
- Runners-up: Evansville Otters

Seasons
- ← 2022 2024 →

The 2023 Frontier League season was the 30th season of operation (29th season of play) of the Frontier League (FL). The regular season began on May 11, 2023, when the Florence Y'alls were hosting the Gateway Grizzlies at Thomas More Stadium.

The playoffs concluded on September 17, with the Québec Capitales defeating the Evansville Otters in the finals in five games, winning their second consecutive championship and 9th in franchise history.

== Team and rule changes ==
The 16 teams in the league are split evenly between two divisions, East and West. The Empire State Greys return as a traveling team with a roster of players from the Empire Professional Baseball League.

The season will be played with a 96-game schedule; teams play either three or four series against their divisional rivals while facing the eight teams from the other division at least one series each. The top three teams in each division will qualify for the 2023 playoffs, with the first-place team already qualifying for the division championship, and the second and third place teams playing each other in a wild card game.

Teams were required to spend a maximum of $375,000 on their 24-player rosters with a minimum of $11,000 per player. A team making full use of the U23 salary rule could reach a compensation maximum of $425,000.

== Regular season standings ==
East Division Regular Season Standings
Pos	Team	G	W	L	Pct.	GB
1	y – Québec Capitales	95	60	35	.632	--
2	x – New Jersey Jackals	95	60	35	.632	--
3	x – Sussex County Miners	95	55	40	.579	5.0
4	e – Tri-City ValleyCats	95	55	40	.579	5.0
5	e – New York Boulders	96	54	42	.563	6.5
6	e – Ottawa Titans	96	48	48	.500	12.5
7	e – Trois-Rivières Aigles	95	38	57	.400	22.0
8	e – Empire State Greys	95	18	77	.189	42.0

West Division Regular Season Standings
Pos	Team	G	W	L	Pct.	GB
1	y – Gateway Grizzlies	96	59	37	.615	--
2	x – Schaumburg Boomers	95	54	41	.568	4.5
3	x – Evansville Otters	96	52	44	.542	7.0
4	e – Washington Wild Things	96	47	49	.490	12.0
5	e – Joliet Slammers	96	46	50	.479	13.0
6	e – Windy City ThunderBolts	95	43	52	.453	15.5
7	e – Florence Y'alls	96	38	58	.396	21.0
8	e – Lake Erie Crushers	96	37	59	.385	22.0

- y – Clinched division
- x – Clinched playoff spot
- e – Eliminated from playoff contention

Sussex County earned the second wild-card spot in the East Division because of a 7-2 head-to-head record against Tri-City.

== Statistical leaders ==
=== Hitting ===
Stat	Player	Team	Total
HR	Keon Barnum, James Nelson	New Jersey Jackals, New Jersey Jackals	30
AVG	James Nelson	New Jersey Jackals	.388
RBIs	Alfredo Marte, Josh Rehwaldt	New Jersey Jackals, New Jersey Jackals	90
SB	Jairus Richards	Gateway Grizzlies	75

=== Pitching ===
Stat	Player	Team	Total
W	Cole Cook	Joliet Slammers	12
ERA	Cole Cook	Joliet Slammers	2.23
SO	Collin Sullivan	Gateway Grizzlies	135
SV	Frank Moscatiello	Québec Capitales	20

== Awards ==
=== End of year awards ===
Award	Player	Team
Most Valuable Player	James Nelson	New Jersey Jackals
Pitcher of the Year	Cole Cook	Joliet Slammers
Rookie of the Year	Noah Myers	Evansville Otters
Manager of the Year	Steve Brook	Gateway Grizzlies

== Playoffs ==
=== Format ===
The second-place team hosted the third-place team from their division in a wild card game. The winners of these games faced their division winners in best-of-three divisional series, with the division winners hosting games 2 and 3 (if necessary). The championship series was a best-of-five format, with the team advancing with the best regular-season record hosting games 3, 4 and 5 (if necessary).

=== Playoff bracket ===
Wild Card Game
3	Sussex County Miners	0
2	New Jersey Jackals	5
3	Evansville Otters	4
2	Schaumburg Boomers	3

Division Series (best-of-three)
East Division
2	New Jersey Jackals	4	2	6
1	Québec Capitales	3	14	15
West Division
3	Evansville Otters	4	5	9
1	Gateway Grizzlies	3	15	7

Championship Series (best-of-five)
E1	Québec Capitales	7	7	5	2	12
W3	Evansville Otters	6	6	14	3	3

== See also ==
- 2023 Major League Baseball season
- 2023 Nippon Professional Baseball season
- 2023 KBO League season
- 2023 Mexican League season
- 2023 Chinese Professional Baseball League season
- 2023 Pioneer League season
