= 2022 Frontier League season =

29th annual season of the Frontier League

- League: Frontier League
- Sport: Baseball
- Duration: May 12 – September 4 (Playoffs: September 6 – September 18)
- Games: 96 (768 games in total)
- Teams: 16

East Division
- League champions: Québec Capitales

West Division
- League champions: Schaumburg Boomers

Frontier League Championship
- Champions: Québec Capitales
- Runners-up: Schaumburg Boomers

Seasons
- ← 2021 2023 →

The 2022 Frontier League season was the 29th season of operation (28th season of play) of the Frontier League (FL). The league expanded to 16 teams with the addition of the Empire State Greys. The league had a May-to-September regular season scheduling and a full 96-game regular season. The season began on May 12.

The playoffs concluded on September 18, with the Québec Capitales defeating the Schaumburg Boomers in the finals in four games, winning their eight championship in franchise history.

== Team and rule changes ==
The 16 teams in the league are split evenly between two divisions, East and West.

Due to the folding of the Southern Illinois Miners following the 2021 season, the league introduced a new team, the Empire State Greys, to compete as a traveling team with a roster of players from the Empire Professional Baseball League.

The season was played with a 96-game schedule; teams play either three or four series against their division rivals while facing the eight teams from the other division at least once each. The top three teams in each division will qualify for the 2022 playoffs, with the first-place team already qualifying for the division championship, and the second and third place teams playing each other in a wild card game.

The maximum team compensation for this season remained at $603,000 split between players and coaching staff. The maximum spend on player compensation was $375,000. In 2022, the U23 player salary rule was introduced which counts financial compensation to players aged 23 or under at 50% towards the cap (up to a maximum of $50,000).

== Regular season standings ==
East Division Regular Season Standings
Pos	Team	G	W	L	Pct.	GB
1	y – Québec Capitales	96	62	34	.646	--
2	x – New York Boulders	95	57	38	.600	4.5
3	x – Ottawa Titans	95	56	39	.589	5.5
4	e – Sussex County Miners	95	54	41	.568	7.5
5	e – Tri-City ValleyCats	95	54	41	.568	7.5
6	e – New Jersey Jackals	94	45	49	.479	16.0
7	e – Trois-Rivières Aigles	95	45	50	.474	16.5
8	e – Empire State Greys	96	6	90	.063	56.0

West Division Regular Season Standings
Pos	Team	G	W	L	Pct.	GB
1	y – Washington Wild Things	96	62	34	.646	--
2	x – Schaumburg Boomers	96	53	43	.552	9.0
3	x – Evansville Otters	95	52	43	.547	9.5
4	e – Joliet Slammers	96	49	47	.510	13.0
5	e – Lake Erie Crushers	96	49	47	.510	13.0
6	e – Gateway Grizzlies	96	47	49	.490	15.0
7	e – Florence Y'alls	95	39	56	.411	22.5
8	e – Windy City ThunderBolts	95	33	62	.347	28.5

- y – Clinched division
- x – Clinched playoff spot
- e – Eliminated from playoff contention

== Statistical leaders ==
=== Hitting ===
Stat	Player	Team	Total
HR	Denis Phipps	Tri-City ValleyCats	33
AVG	Brantley Bell	Tri-City ValleyCats	.368
RBIs	Chris Kwitzer	New York Boulders	96
SB	Brynn Martinez	Windy City ThunderBolts	43

=== Pitching ===
Stat	Player	Team	Total
W	Rob Whalen, John Baker	Washington Wild Things, Sussex County Miners	12
ERA	Miguel Cienfuegos	Québec Capitales	1.79
SO	Jorge Tavarez	New Jersey Jackals	142
SV	Logan Sawyer	Evansville Otters	22

== Awards ==
=== End of year awards ===
Award	Player	Team
Most Valuable Player	Brantley Bell	Tri-City ValleyCats
Pitcher of the Year	Miguel Cienfuegos	Québec Capitales
Rookie of the Year	Kobe Foster	Washington Wild Things
Manager of the Year	Tom Vaeth	Washington Wild Things

== Playoffs ==
=== Format ===
The second-place team will host the third-place team from their division in a wild card game. The winner of these games will face their division winners in a best-of-three divisional series, with the division winners hosting games 2 and 3 (if necessary). The championship playoffs shall be scheduled to begin on the second day following the scheduled completion of the division playoffs. The championship series will be a best-of-five format. The team advancing with the best regular-season record will host games 3, 4, and 5 (if necessary). In the event of a tie, tie-breaking procedures as outlined in league rules will be utilized.

=== Playoff bracket ===
Wild Card Game
3	Ottawa Titans	8
2	New York Boulders	2
3	Evansville Otters	1
2	Schaumburg Boomers	5

Division Series (best-of-three)
East Division
3	Ottawa Titans	3	3	1
1	Québec Capitales	0	4	5
West Division
2	Schaumburg Boomers	11	7	X
1	Washington Wild Things	2	2	X

Championship Series (best-of-five)
E1	Québec Capitales	6	1	4	2	X
W2	Schaumburg Boomers	3	9	3	1	X

== See also ==
- 2022 Major League Baseball season
- 2022 American Association season
- 2022 Pecos League season
