= Kelly Stinnett =

American baseball player (born 1970)

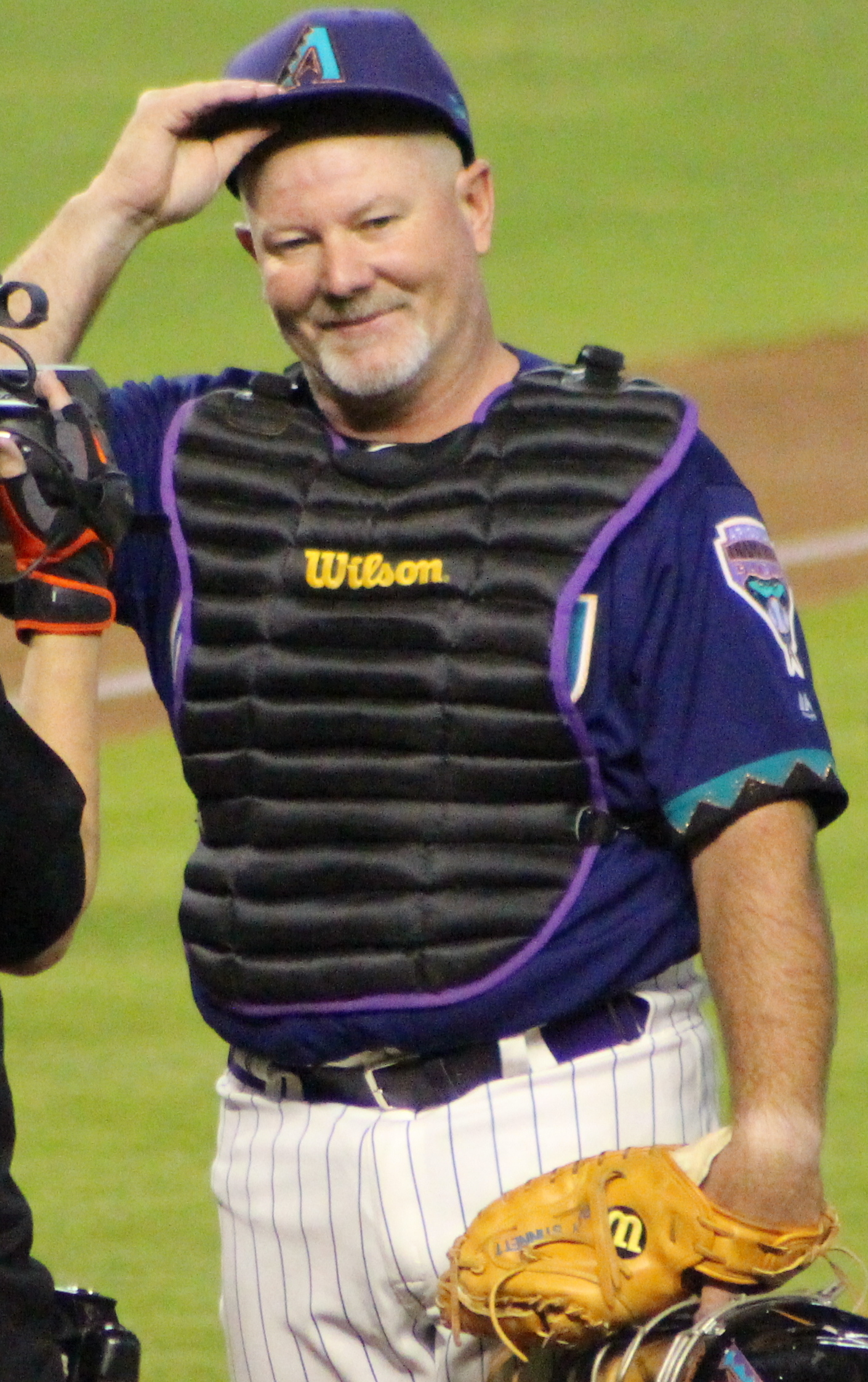
- Stinnett at the 2017 Arizona Diamondbacks Alumni Game

Park–Gilbert Buccaneers
- Head Coach / Catcher
- Born: February 14, 1970 (age 56); Lawton, Oklahoma, U.S.
- Batted: Right Threw: Right

MLB debut
- April 5, 1994, for the New York Mets

Last MLB appearance
- September 30, 2007, for the St. Louis Cardinals

MLB statistics
- Batting average: .234
- Home runs: 65
- Runs batted in: 230
- Stats at Baseball Reference

Teams
- New York Mets (1994–1995); Milwaukee Brewers (1996–1997); Arizona Diamondbacks (1998–2000); Cincinnati Reds (2001–2003); Philadelphia Phillies (2003); Kansas City Royals (2004); Arizona Diamondbacks (2005); New York Yankees (2006); New York Mets (2006); St. Louis Cardinals (2007)

Kelly Lee Stinnett (born February 14, 1970) is an American former Major League Baseball catcher. He played all or parts of 14 seasons in the majors, from 1994 until 2007.

== Early life ==
Stinnett attended Lawton High School in Lawton, Oklahoma and was a letterman in football and baseball. As a junior in 1987, he quarterbacked Lawton's football team to an undefeated record and state championship alongside fellow juniors Dewell Brewer, Butch Huskey, Will Shields and James Trapp.

== College career ==
He attended Seminole Junior College in Oklahoma, where in his freshman year he was All-Conference and All-Region after leading all junior college players with 30 home runs and 124 runs batted in. In his sophomore year, he was National Junior College Player of the Year and a first-team All-American. That year, he had a batting average of .399 and had 22 home runs and 97 RBI, leading his team to a third-place finish in the Junior College World Series.

== Professional career ==
He was drafted by the Cleveland Indians in the 1989 amateur draft as the 279th overall pick, and was selected by the New York Mets in the 1993 Rule 5 draft on December 13, 1993. He began his first season the following spring, on April 5, 1994, with the Mets.

Between 1994 and 2004, Stinnett played in the majors for the Mets, Milwaukee Brewers, Arizona Diamondbacks, Cincinnati Reds, Philadelphia Phillies, and Kansas City Royals.

He made a return to the Diamondbacks on December 13, 2004, when he was signed to a minor league contract. Stinnett made his return to the major leagues on May 28, 2005, in a 5–4 win against the Los Angeles Dodgers. In late November 2005, Stinnett signed a one-year deal with the New York Yankees.

Stinnett was designated for assignment by the Yankees on July 26, 2006, after the Yankees traded for Phillies' back-up catcher Sal Fasano. On August 24, 2006, Stinnett signed a minor league contract with the Mets. He made his return to Shea Stadium as a Met on September 9, 2006, against the Los Angeles Dodgers, and went 1–3. He finished September with a .083 batting average, and was not included on the 2006 New York Mets postseason roster. On February 17, 2007, he signed a minor league deal with the Los Angeles Dodgers. On June 3, 2007, he was picked up by the St. Louis Cardinals for cash considerations.

On June 28, 2013, Stinnett was named manager of the Montezuma Federals, a minor league team based in Prescott, Arizona, with the Freedom Pro Baseball League.

On April 22, 2015, Stinnett was named the head coach of the Watertown Bucks in their inaugural season in the East Coast Baseball League. Stinnett resigned July 5, 2015 as manager of the Watertown Bucks.

As of 2018, Stinnett is the head baseball coach at Park University's Gilbert, Arizona, campus.
