= Tony Rodríguez (baseball) =

Puerto Rican baseball player (born 1970)

- Shortstop
- Born: August 15, 1970 (age 55); Río Piedras, Puerto Rico
- Batted: Right Threw: Right

MLB debut
- July 6, 1996, for the Boston Red Sox

Last MLB appearance
- September 23, 1996, for the Boston Red Sox

MLB statistics
- Batting average: .239
- Home runs: 1
- Runs batted in: 9
- Stats at Baseball Reference

Teams
- Boston Red Sox (1996)

Luis Antonio Rodríguez (born August 15, 1970) is a Puerto Rican former Major League Baseball (MLB) shortstop and manager. He played for the Boston Red Sox during the 1996 season.

== Playing career ==
Listed at 5' 11", 165 lb., Rodríguez batted and threw right-handed. He was selected by Boston in the 1991 draft out of the University of Charleston.

In one-season career, Rodríguez was a .239 hitter (16-for-67) with nine RBI in 27 games, including one home run, one double, and seven runs scored.

Rodríguez also played in the Red Sox, Mariners and Cubs minor league systems from 1992 to 2001, hitting .243 with 11 home runs and 167 RBI in 616 games.

== Managing career ==
On May 16, 2018, Rodríguez was contracted by the Puerto Rico Islanders of the Empire Professional Baseball League (EPBL). During the regular season, he led the team to a second-place finish with a 27–18 record. On August 12, 2018, Rodríguez managed the Islanders to the Zakari Cup (EPBL) championship by besting the New York Bucks in the final series. This was the team's first title in two seasons of existence.

In January 2022, Rodríguez was hired by the Tigres de Quintana Roo of the Mexican League as the team's manager. He was sacked on June 13, 2022.

== See also ==
- 1996 Boston Red Sox season
- List of Major League Baseball players from Puerto Rico
