= Malone Border Hounds =

- Logo

Information
- League: Empire Professional Baseball League
- Location: Malone, New York
- Ballpark: American Legion 219 Veterans Field
- Founded: 2023
- League championships: 2023, 2025, 2026
- Website: maloneborderhounds.com//

The Malone Border Hounds are an independent minor league baseball team based in Malone, New York that plays in the Empire Professional Baseball League. The Border Hounds play their home games at the American Legion Post 219 Veterans Field in Malone and was managed by former MLB pitcher Ray King in 2024. They are managed by Jason LaFlesh beginning in late part of 2024 regular season. They won the league championship in 2025 following a 28-9 record before sweeping through the playoffs. LaFlesh is the active wins leader in current franchise history.

== History ==
The Border Hounds began play in the Empire Professional Baseball League (EPBL) in 2023. They finished second among five teams in the 2023 EPBL season after ending the season on a twelve-game win streak, and then followed that up by capturing the 2023 EPBL championship with a 2–0 series win over the Plattsburgh Thunderbirds. They finished the 2024 EPBL season with a 17–21 record, good for third in the now-four-team league.

== Year-by-year results ==
Season	GP	W	L	Postseason result
2023	26	18	8	Won championship
2024	38	17	21	
2025	37	28	9	Won championship
2026	33	18	15	Won championship

== Affiliations ==
Players for the Border Hounds—as well as players from the rest of the EPBL—can have their contracts selected to play for the Empire State Greys, a traveling team that competes in the MLB-partnered Frontier League.
