= Tupper Lake Riverpigs =

- Logo

Information
- League: Empire Professional Baseball League
- Location: Tupper Lake, New York
- Ballpark: Tupper Lake Municipal Park
- Founded: 2020
- League championships: 2022, 2024
- Manager: Darren Ford
- Website: tupperlakeriverpigs.com//

The Tupper Lake Riverpigs are an independent minor league baseball team based in Tupper Lake, New York that plays in the Empire Professional Baseball League. The Riverpigs play their home games at Tupper Lake Municipal Park and have been managed by former MLB outfielder Darren Ford since 2024.

== History ==
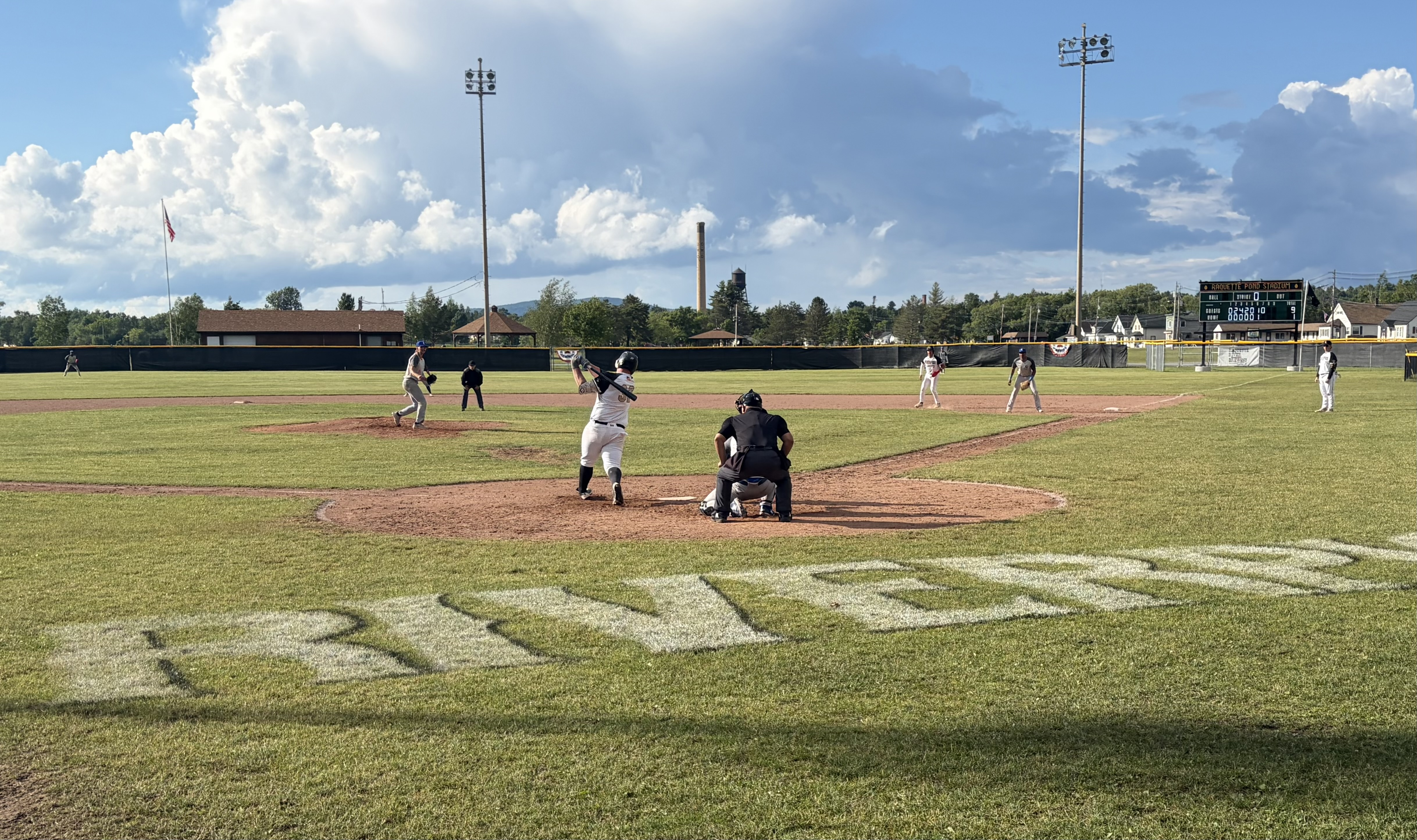
First baseman Connor Donohue of the Tupper Lake Riverpigs bats against the Saranac Lake Surge at Raquette Pond Stadium.

The Riverpigs played their inaugural Empire Professional Baseball League (EPBL) season in 2020. They finished that season at 7–18, which was tied for the worst record in the EPBL, but enjoyed moderate success in their second season, going 22–20. They beat the Plattsburgh Thunderbirds for the EPBL Championship in 2022 and posted a league-leading 32–9 record. They won the championship again in 2024, beating the Thunderbirds despite finishing with a worse record. The Riverpigs' two EPBL championships are the most by a single team in the league's history, which dates back to 2016.

== Year-by-year results ==
Season	GP	W	L	Postseason result
2020	25	7	18	
2021	42	22	20	
2022	41	32	9	Won championship
2023	26	20	6	
2024	41	22	17	Won championship

== Affiliations ==
The EPBL is not affiliated with Major League Baseball—as such, the Riverpigs and the rest of the league's franchises serve as farm teams meant to give young, inexperienced players an opportunity to stay in shape and work their way towards being signed to higher-level contracts with MILB-affiliated or other independent teams. Additionally, Riverpigs players—as well as players from the rest of the EPBL—can have their contracts selected to play for the Empire State Greys, a traveling team that competes in the MLB-partnered Frontier League.
