= Losing streak =

Uninterrupted string of contests lost by a team or individual

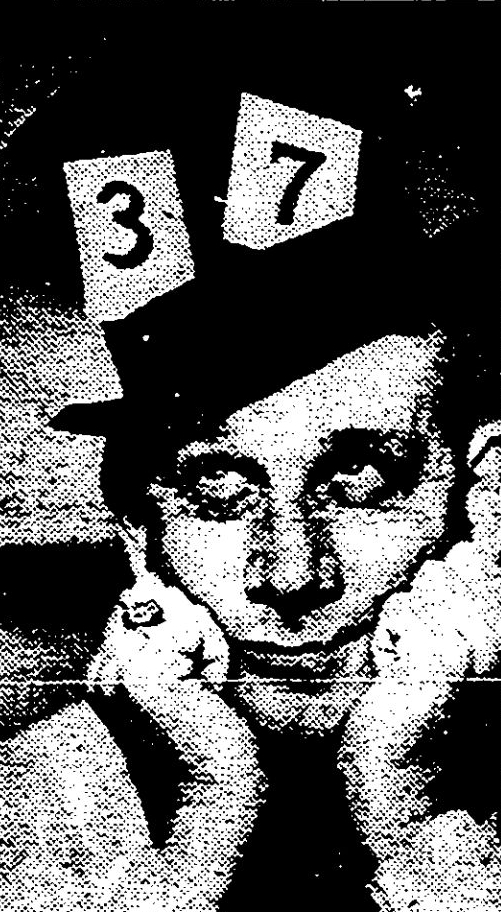
Shimer College basketball coach Les Shepard "celebrates" game 37 of his team's record-setting losing streak in 1963.

== Distinction from winless streak ==
A losing streak and a winless streak are distinctively different, as a winless streak may include:

1. tie games or draws
2. in first-class cricket, unfinished matches
3. in association football, ice hockey and some field hockey leagues where points are awarded for wins and drawn games, overtime or shootout losses if the draw at the end of regulation counts as a draw for points percentage.

Tie games can also be included in an unbeaten streak, as in soccer.

== Existence and causation ==
Most quantitative studies of winning and losing streaks, and the associated concept of psychological momentum, have failed to find any evidence that "streaks" actually exist, except as a matter of random chance. A team with low ability is more likely to lose frequently, and a team with high ability is more likely to win, but once ability is controlled for, there is no evidence that a "winning" or "losing" streak affects the result of the match. In fact, one study of European association football matches using a Monte Carlo methodology found that once ability was accounted for, a team was actually slightly less likely to win or lose when it had experienced the same result in the previous match.

Despite the apparent nonexistence of streaks in quantitative terms, many scholars in the field have pointed to the importance of understanding qualitative, psychological aspects of streaks. A series of losses can have a negative effect on team morale even if it has no direct effect on the outcome of the next game.

Studies in sports management suggest that some managers are able to interrupt losing streaks (and prolong winning streaks) through managerial strategies such as changing the lineup or rotation of players. Similarly, effective mental strategies may enable individual athletes to resist the psychological effects of a "losing streak" by staying focused on the task at hand. In team sports, effective strategies for combating negative momentum may include team cohesion activities and increasing the use of positive body language.

To the extent that they exist, losing streaks may arise from the loser effect: an increased probability of losing at time T, based on losing at time T−1, T−2, etc. This means that one has a slightly higher probability of losing the next match because one lost the previous one. The outcome of a match does not solely depend on the strength of the opponents, but also on how much effort one or the other is willing to invest. The loser effect rises from the tendency to hold back on the next match after losing. On the other hand, the winner effect encourages the opponent who won the previous match to invest more in the next fight. This phenomenon is well known in the study of animal behavior, where the winner and loser effects help to keep the level of conflicts low in group living animals.

== Longest losing streaks ==
List of the longest individual losing streaks of all time in each sport:

=== American football ===
- NFL Football:
  - 29 games – Chicago Cardinals: (1942–1945, counts ten losses the team incurred as half of the merged Card-Pitt franchise in 1944)
  - 26 games – Tampa Bay Buccaneers: (1976–1977, post-merger era record and record for one continuous team)
- WFL: 13 games – Chicago Fire and Chicago Winds: (1974–1975, streak includes at least one forfeit, dropped out of the league and folded five games into the 1975 season, seven weeks before the rest of the league followed suit)
- XFL: 7 games – Birmingham Thunderbolts: (2001, ended when league folded)
- UFL (and predecessor conferences): 8 games – Memphis Showboats (2024)
- NCAA Football Division I (FBS): 34 games – Northwestern Wildcats: (1979–1982)
- NCAA Football Division I (FCS): 80 games – Prairie View A&M Panthers: (1989–1998)
- NCAA Football Division II: 52 games – Lock Haven Bald Eagles: (2007–2012)
- NCAA Football Division III: 53 games – Earlham Quakers: (2013–2018). Suspended the program after five consecutive winless seasons.
- Sprint football: 106 games – Princeton Tigers (1999–2015). Streak includes at least four forfeits, and ended upon the program being shut down.
- Semi-professional football: 59 games – York Lions (1990–1995)
- High school football: 101 games - Columbia High School, Huntsville, Alabama (2015-2026)

=== Association football ===
- National teams: 61 games - San Marino football team (2004–2014).
- MLS soccer: 12 games – New York/New Jersey MetroStars: (1999) and Cincinnati: (2021)
- USL Pro Soccer: 26 games – Antigua Barracuda: (2013)
- Thai League: 27 games – Super Power Samut Prakan: (2017)
- Premier League: 16 games – Norwich City (2019–2021)
- La Liga: 11 games – Las Palmas (1959–1960)

=== Australian rules football ===
- VFL/AFL: 51 matches – University in 1912–1914 (dropped out of competition at end of 1914)
- SANFL: 56 matches – Glenelg in 1921–1924
- WAFL: 27 games – West Perth in 1938–1939 and Peel Thunder in 1997–1998 and 1998–2000

=== Auto racing ===
- NASCAR Cup Series: 653 races – J. D. McDuffie (died in a crash on the fifth lap of the 1991 Budweiser at The Glen, did not win race in entire career)

=== Canadian football ===
- CFL Football: 25 games – Ottawa Senators/Rough Riders: (1928–1933). The streak was achieved back when the Senators/Rough Riders played in the Interprovincial Rugby Football Union, which later became the Canadian Football League East Division. The CFL was not formally founded until 1958, although the records of the IRFU & the Western Interprovincial Football Union in Western Canada (forerunner to the Canadian Football League West Division) were incorporated into the league.
- CIS Football: 49 games – Toronto Varsity Blues: (2001–2008)

=== Baseball ===
- MLB Baseball:
  - American Association: 26 games – Louisville Colonels: (1889)
  - National League: 24 games – Cleveland Spiders: (1899)
  - American League: 21 games – Baltimore Orioles: (1988), Chicago White Sox: (2024)
  - Federal League: 9 games – Baltimore Terrapins: (1915)
  - Postseason: 18 games – Minnesota Twins: (2004–2023)
- MLB Partner League:
  - Frontier League: 27 games - Empire State Greys: (2022)
- Baseball Pitcher
  - National League: 27 consecutive losing decisions – Anthony Young: (1992–1993)
- Japanese Baseball League: 16 games – Dai Tokyo: (1936)
- Nippon Professional Baseball:
  - Central League: 16 games – Yakult Atoms/Tokyo Yakult Swallows: (1970, 2019)
  - Pacific League: 18 games – Chiba Lotte Marines: (1993)
- KBO League: 18 games – Sammi Superstars: (1985), Hanwha Eagles: (2020)

=== Basketball ===
- Professional Basketball
  - NBA Basketball: 28 games – Philadelphia 76ers (2014–16; two seasons); Detroit Pistons (2023–2024)
  - WNBA Basketball: 20 games – Tulsa Shock: (2011); Indiana Fever: (2022–23; two seasons)
  - Korean Basketball League: 32 games – Daegu Monkey Man Orions: (1998–99)
  - Liga Nacional de Baloncesto Profesional: 32 games – Volcanes del Estado de México: (2011–12)
  - Philippine Basketball Association: 29 games – Blackwater Bossing: (2020–2022; two seasons)
- Collegiate Basketball
  - NCAA Basketball:
    - Division I, men: 41 games – Towson Tigers: (2011–2012)
    - Division I, women: 59 games – Chicago State Lady Cougars: (2016–2018)
    - Division II, men: 46 games – Olivet Comets: (1959–1961); Southwest Minnesota State Mustangs (1971–1973)
    - Division II, women: 70 games – Notre Dame de Namur Argonauts
    - Division III, men: 207 games – Caltech Beavers: (1996–2007) (record for all divisions, men or women)
    - Division III, women: 83 games – Schreiner Mountaineers, (all-division record for women)
    - Note: New Jersey Institute of Technology Highlanders lost 51 games (2007–2009) while in the process of becoming a Division I program, but is not an official record.
  - NAIA Basketball
    - Division I, men: 106 games – STLCOP Eutectics: (2014–2018)

=== Cricket ===
- Test Cricket: 21 matches – Bangladesh – (2001–2004)
- One Day International cricket: 23 matches – Bangladesh – (1999–2002)
- Twenty20 International: 12 matches – Bangladesh – (2007–2012)
- Combined international cricket: 28 matches – Bangladesh – (10 tests, 18 ODIs, 2003–2004)
- Twenty20 club or domestic: 19 matches (tie) – Quetta Bears – (2005 – 2012); Sydney Thunder – (December 2011 – January 2014); 13-Matches – Siechem Madurai Panthers - (July 2016 - August 2017)

=== Esports ===
- Overwatch: 42 matches – Shanghai Dragons (2018–2019)
- League of Legends: 39 matches – V3 Esports (2021-2022)
- Dota 2: 26 matches – B8 (2020)

=== Hockey ===
- NHL hockey: 18 games - Pittsburgh Penguins (2003-2004), Buffalo Sabres (2021)
- Asia League Ice Hockey: 192 games – China Dragon: (2009–2014)

=== Lacrosse ===
- NCAA Lacrosse Division I: 29 games – Wagner College
- NCAA Lacrosse Division III: 92 games – City College of New York

=== Professional wrestling ===
- WWE: 269 matches – Curt Hawkins (2016–2019)
  - [note: Hawkins' 269 losses between his victories over Apollo Crews on November 8, 2016 (WWE SmackDown Live) and The Revival on April 7, 2019 (WWE Wrestlemania 35 Kickoff), only include his televised and house show matches in which he was an official participant (regardless of match format).]

=== Rugby League ===
- NSWRL and NRL rugby league: 7 games – Sydney University rugby league team
- Rugby League in England: 9 games – Runcorn Highfield RLFC (1989–1991). The run consisted of 55 Division Two, 2 Challenge Cup, 2 Regal Trophy, and 2 Lancashire Cup-ties.

=== Tennis ===
- NCAA Men's Tennis Division 1: 59 matches – Wagner College (2007–2012)
- ATP: 21 consecutive matches – Vince Spadea (October 1999–June 2000)
- WTA: 24 consecutive matches – Zhang Shuai (October 1999–June 2000)

=== Padel ===
- Cavan Paddlers
- 2022 - Martin O'Reilly (24 matches)
- 2023 - Martin O'Reilly (16 matches)

=== Ultimate Frisbee ===
- UFA: 81 matches - Detroit Mechanix (April 29, 2017 – June 22, 2024)

== See also ==
- List of Major League Baseball longest losing streaks
- List of National Basketball Association longest losing streaks
- Imperfect season
- Winning streak
