= Japan Islanders =

Professional baseball team based in Puerto Rico

Logo
Cap insignia

Information
- League: Empire Professional Baseball League
- Location: Lyon Mountain, New York
- Founded: 2016
- League championships: Zacari Cup (2018)
- Colors: Blue, red, white

The Japan Islanders are an independent professional baseball team based in Lyon Mountain, New York, United States. They play in the Empire Professional Baseball League (EPBL), which is not affiliated with Major League Baseball.

== History ==
The Puerto Rico Islanders joined the Empire Professional Baseball League for the 2017 season. They played their first season as a traveling team until the league finalized a ballpark and opposing team travel arrangements. In their debut the Islanders fell short of reaching the playoffs by one game.

Tony Rodríguez was hired to manage the Islanders for the 2018 season. The team finished the regular season in second-place with a 27–18 record. On August 12, 2018, the Islanders won the Zakari Cup (EPBL) championship by besting the New York Bucks in the final series. This was the team's first title in two seasons of existence.

=== Renaming ===
After the COVID-19 pandemic cancelled the league's 2020 season, the Puerto Rico Islanders were renamed the Japan Islanders and made into a team with a roster of Japanese players. The team mostly serves as a traveling team playing against the other EPBL teams in New York State, occasionally playing as the home team in Lyon Mountain.
