= The Ballpark (Old Orchard Beach) =

Baseball stadium in Maine, United States

Coordinates: 43°31′0.55″N 70°23′27.83″W

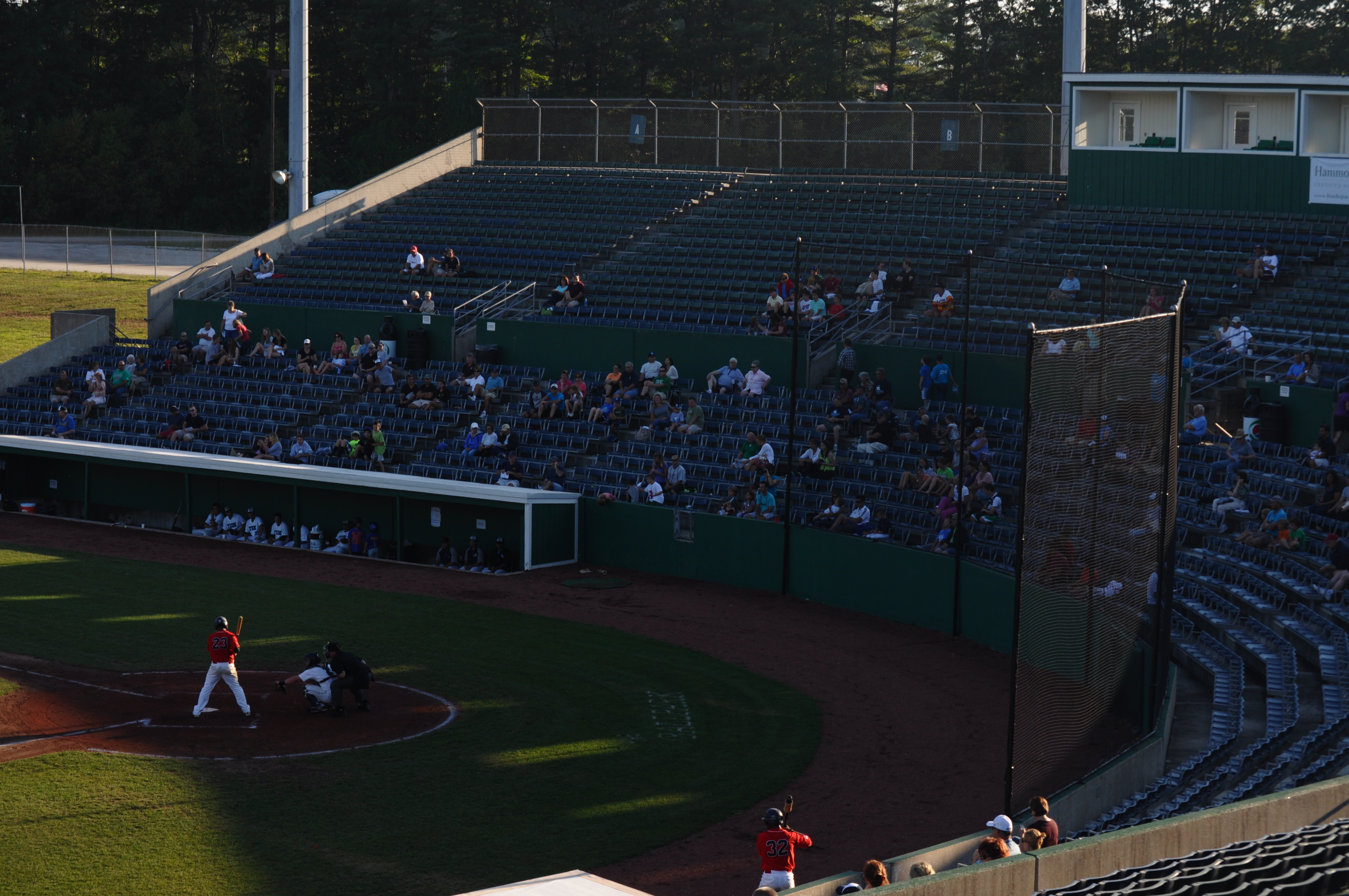
- Interactive map of The Ballpark
- Location: Off Saco Avenue (ME 5) at Cummings Boulevard; Old Orchard Beach, Maine
- Owner: Town of Old Orchard Beach
- Capacity: Baseball – 6,000
- Surface: Grass
- Field size: Left Field: 312 ft Center Field: 405 ft Right Field: 327 ft

Construction
- Groundbreaking: 1983
- Opened: April 18, 1984
- Renovated: 2009

Tenants
- Old Orchard Beach Surge (EPBL) 2015–2018; Old Orchard Beach Raging Tide (NECBL) 2011–2014; Maine Phillies (IL) 1988; Maine Guides (IL) 1984–1987

Website
- Official website

The Ballpark is a baseball stadium in Old Orchard Beach, Maine, United States. The venue has a seating capacity of 6,000 and is a former Triple-A baseball facility that was almost destroyed by years of neglect until a community organized volunteer effort revived the stadium.

The Ballpark was the 2015–2018 home of the Old Orchard Beach Surge of the independent Empire Professional Baseball League. This was the first professional baseball team in Old Orchard Beach since the Maine Phillies left in 1988. Prior to the arrival of the Surge, The Ballpark was home to the Old Orchard Beach Raging Tide of the New England Collegiate Baseball League (2011) and the Futures Collegiate Baseball League (2012–2014).

== History ==
The Ballpark opened in 1984. It was built primarily for baseball and was the home field of the Triple-A International League's Maine Guides from 1984 to 1987 and the Maine Phillies in 1988.

The Guides were the top minor league affiliate for the Cleveland Indians from 1984 to 1986 and the Philadelphia Phillies from 1987–1988. The owners of the team believed that, due to the large amount of vacation traffic that the town receives in the summer months, numerous vacationers would attend games. However, after only five years in existence, the franchise relocated to Moosic, Pennsylvania, following the 1988 season.

Although attendance was not a major problem during the franchise's existence, the park was hampered by three main driving forces: First, in the summer the stadium was home to a large population of Maine Black Flies that pestered fans. Second, there was only one road leading to and from the stadium, thus creating a traffic nightmare. Finally, soon after the stadium was built, other existing Triple-A stadiums were expanded and many new ones were built, making it normal for most Triple-A stadiums to hold well over 10,000 people, far above the 6,000 that the newly constructed Ball Park held, so that very shortly after its construction it was essentially obsolete.

Stadium owner Jordan Kobritz fell behind on debt payments to The Finance Authority of Maine which had lent him the funds to construct the ballpark in 1984. In July 1987, Kobritz agreed to relinquish the deed to the ballpark to The Old Orchard Beach Town Council in exchange for his being release from his financial obligations.

After the Guides left, the stadium was leased to a group called, Seashore Performing Arts Center (SEAPAC), who hosted many concerts in the late 80s and 90s, including shows from Van Halen, Bon Jovi, Whitney Houston, and others. The concerts ceased after local residents complained about the loud noise late at night.

By the 2000s, the Ballpark was shuttered and the facility had suffered from years of neglect. The grass turned into brush and overgrowth, and the walls of the facility started to fall down. The most frequent guests to the stadium were drug users, arsonists, and vandals.

In 2005, Old Orchard Beach considered selling the 50-acre (200,000 m^{2}) site that held the ballpark, as well as the 25-acre (100,000 m^{2}) site that included Old Orchard Beach High School's athletic fields. Then Town Manager Jim Thomas speculated at the time that the site could be sold for $2.5 million and generate $1 million per-year in property taxes.

To make matters worse, a major fire caused by a lightning strike damaged the facility on June 21, 2007. Following this, the town placed a referendum question on the local election ballot proposing to sell the stadium and create room for a condominium complex. This was rejected, with a 2-1 majority in favor of restoring the stadium instead.

== Revitalization and present day ==
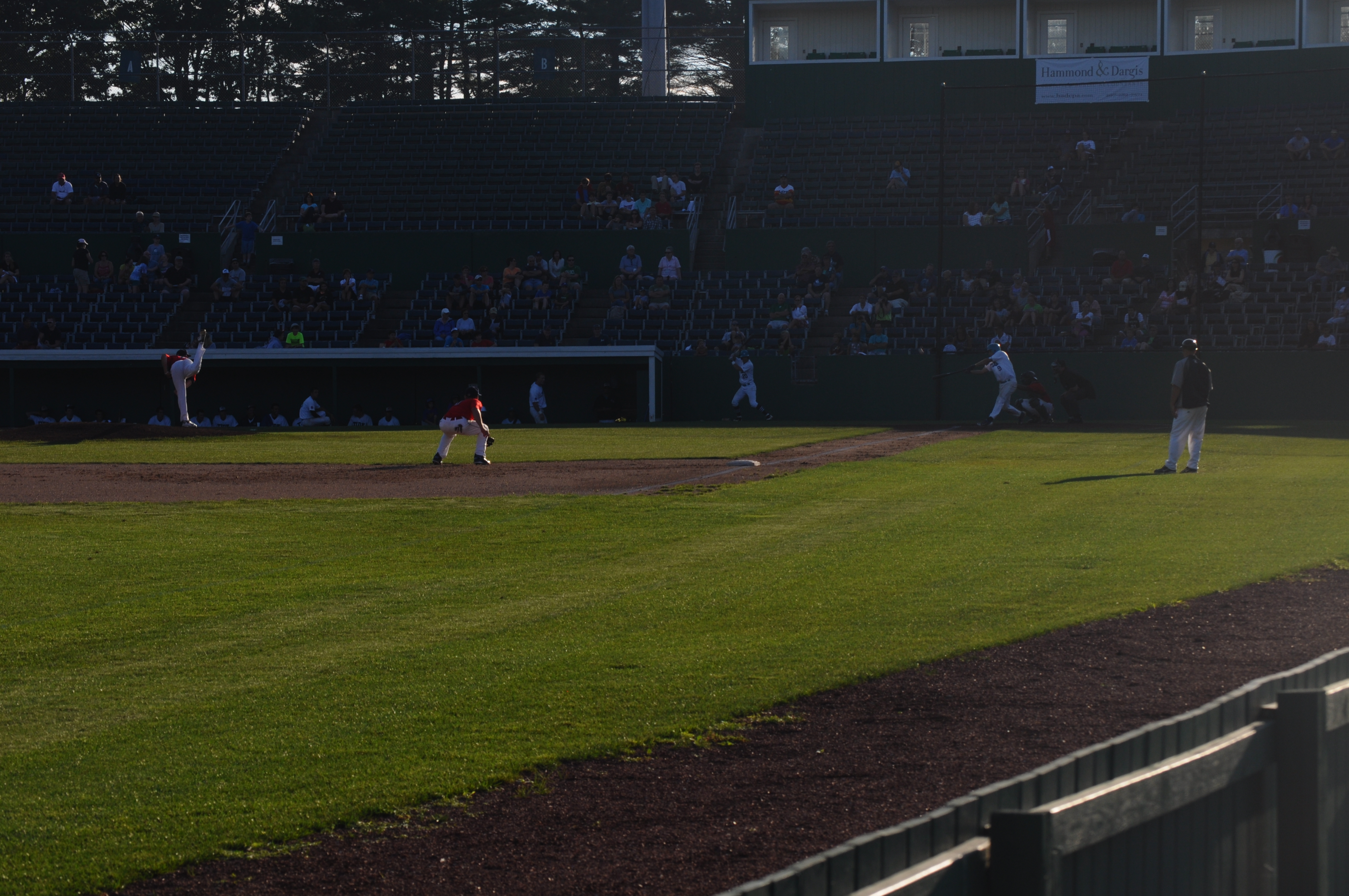
The Ballpark during a 2012 Old Orchard Beach Raging Tide game.

Around April 2008, a local volunteer organization known as The Ball Park Group took on the task of cleaning up the 53-acre (210,000 m^{2}) property and renovating the facility to a condition suitable for hosting games and special events. The volunteers removed the debris from the skybox fire, cleared vegetative overgrowth, rebuilt the dugouts and outfield wall, leveled off the playing field and planted new sod. Much of the skilled work was completed with the volunteer help of local plumbers, contractors, carpenters and electricians and most of the funding has come from private donations.

In October 2009, the website ballparkdigest.com officially removed The Ballpark in Old Orchard Beach from its "Endangered Ballparks List."

On October 31, 2009, the stadium took a major step in resuming active baseball play. Two teams made up of local high school players from all over Southern Maine played the first game at the stadium in nearly 20 years.

In May 2010, the United States Collegiate Athletic Association Baseball National Tournament was held at The Ballpark, and the tournament announced that it would hold its 2011 Tournament there as well. The Can-Am League's Brockton Rox also played a pair of exhibition games at the Ballpark against the Quebec Capitales on May 22 and 23.

On July 2, 2010, the Ballpark hosted its first New England Collegiate Baseball League game when the Sanford Mainers and the Lowell All-Americans played before a crowd of 550 fans. Many felt that an NECBL team, rather than a minor league baseball team, would be the best fit for the ballpark as nearby Portland is home to the Portland Sea Dogs, the Boston Red Sox Double A affiliate. This desire for a full-time team came to fruition in 2011 when the All-Americans moved to Old Orchard Beach and made their debut as the Old Orchard Beach Raging Tide.

The largest crowd was over 2,800 people for a Red Sox alumni game on Friday September 2, 2011.

On June 3, 2015, the Old Orchard Beach Surge played their first home game and beat the Watertown Bucks 13-3 before a crowd of about 500. The team relocated to Saranac Lake, New York for the 2019 season.

== Photo gallery ==
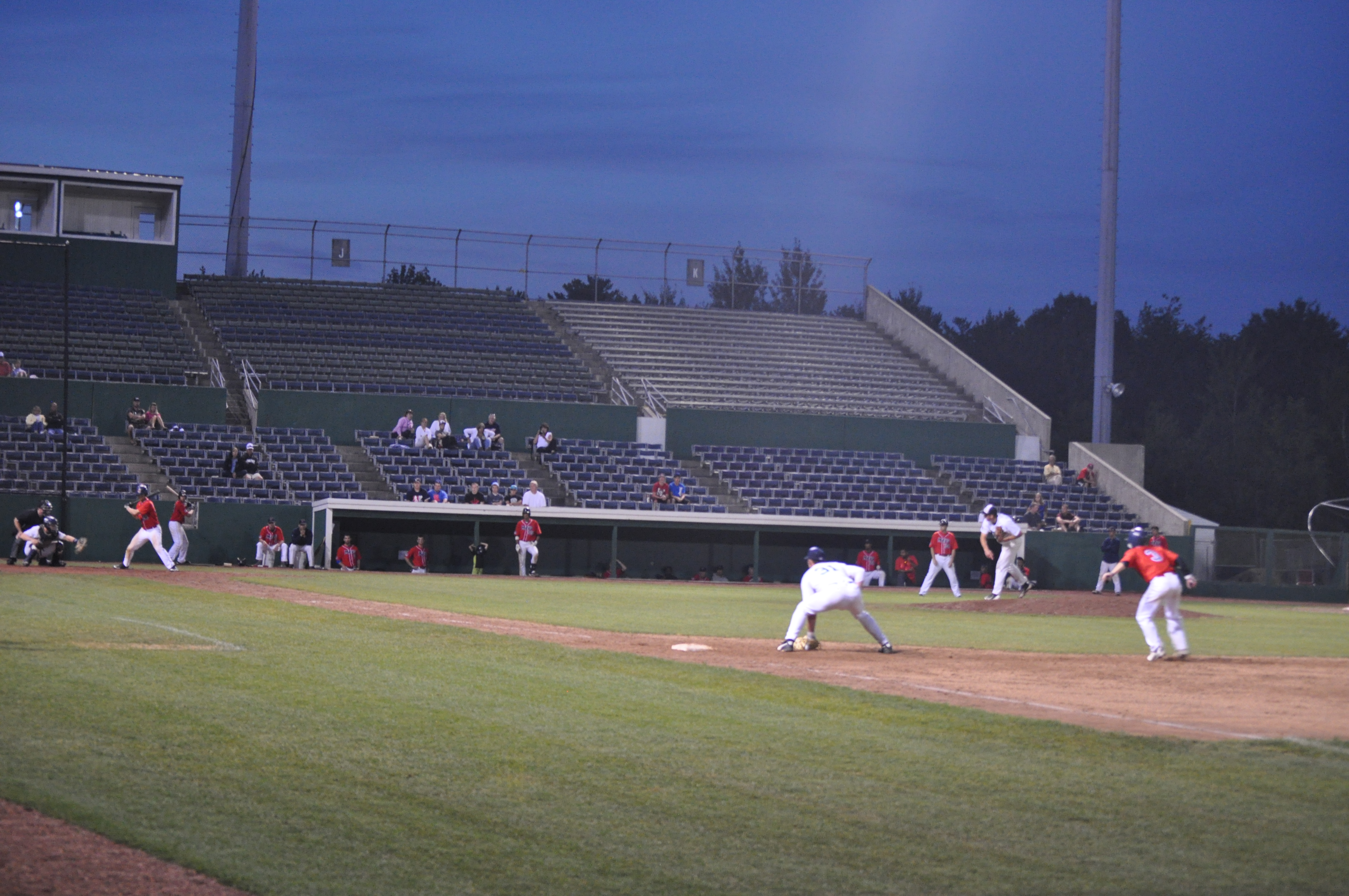

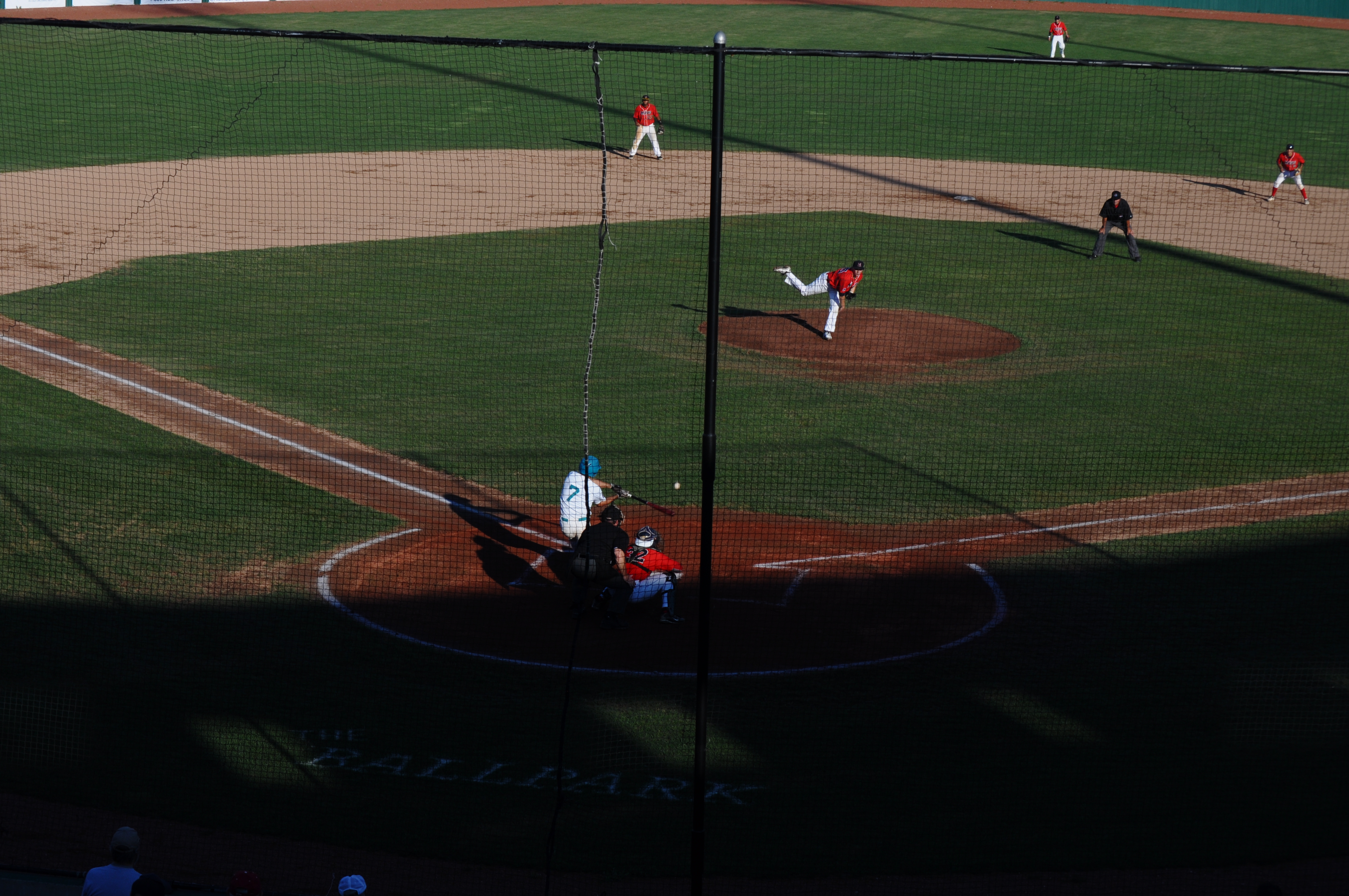

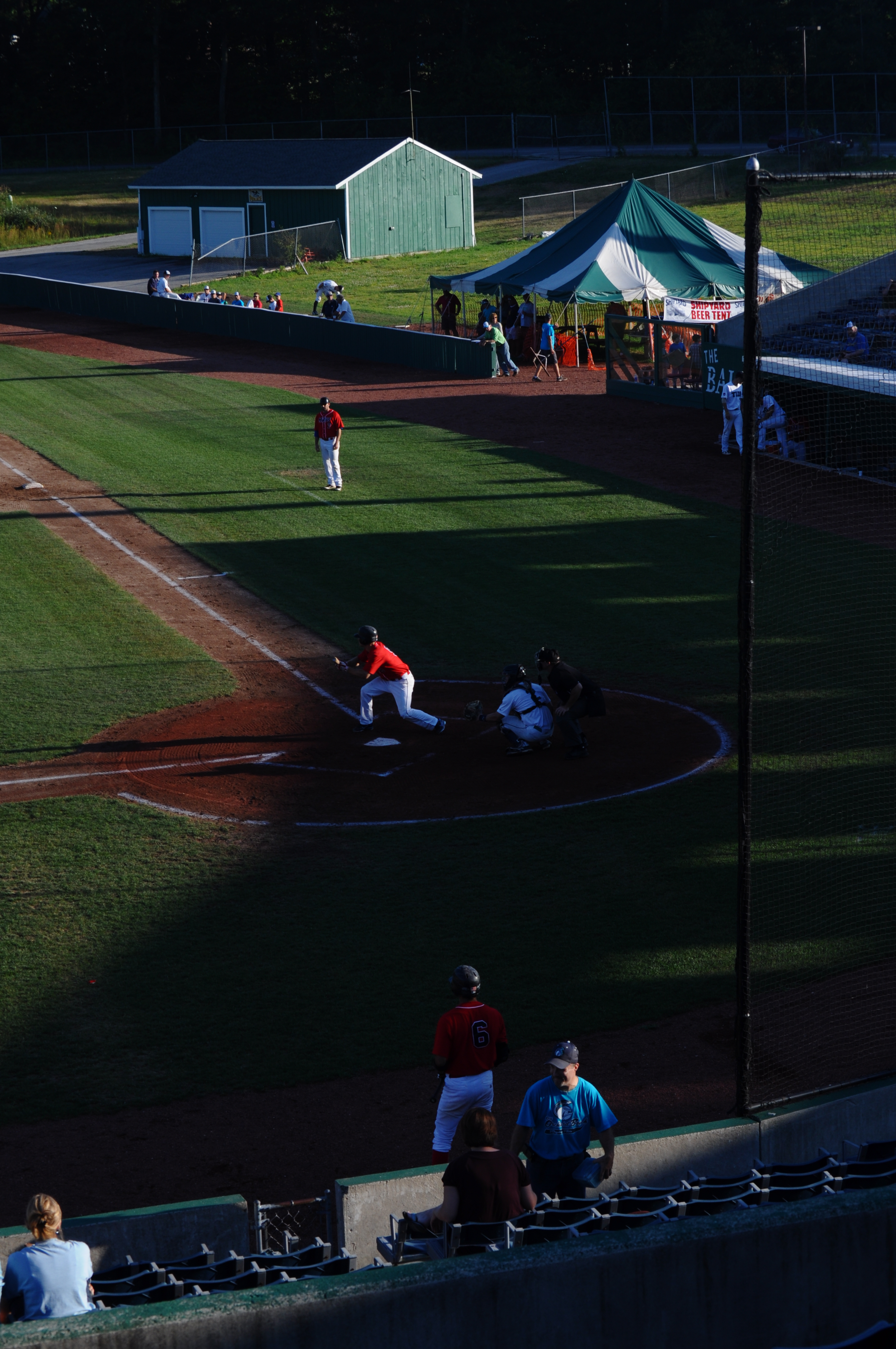

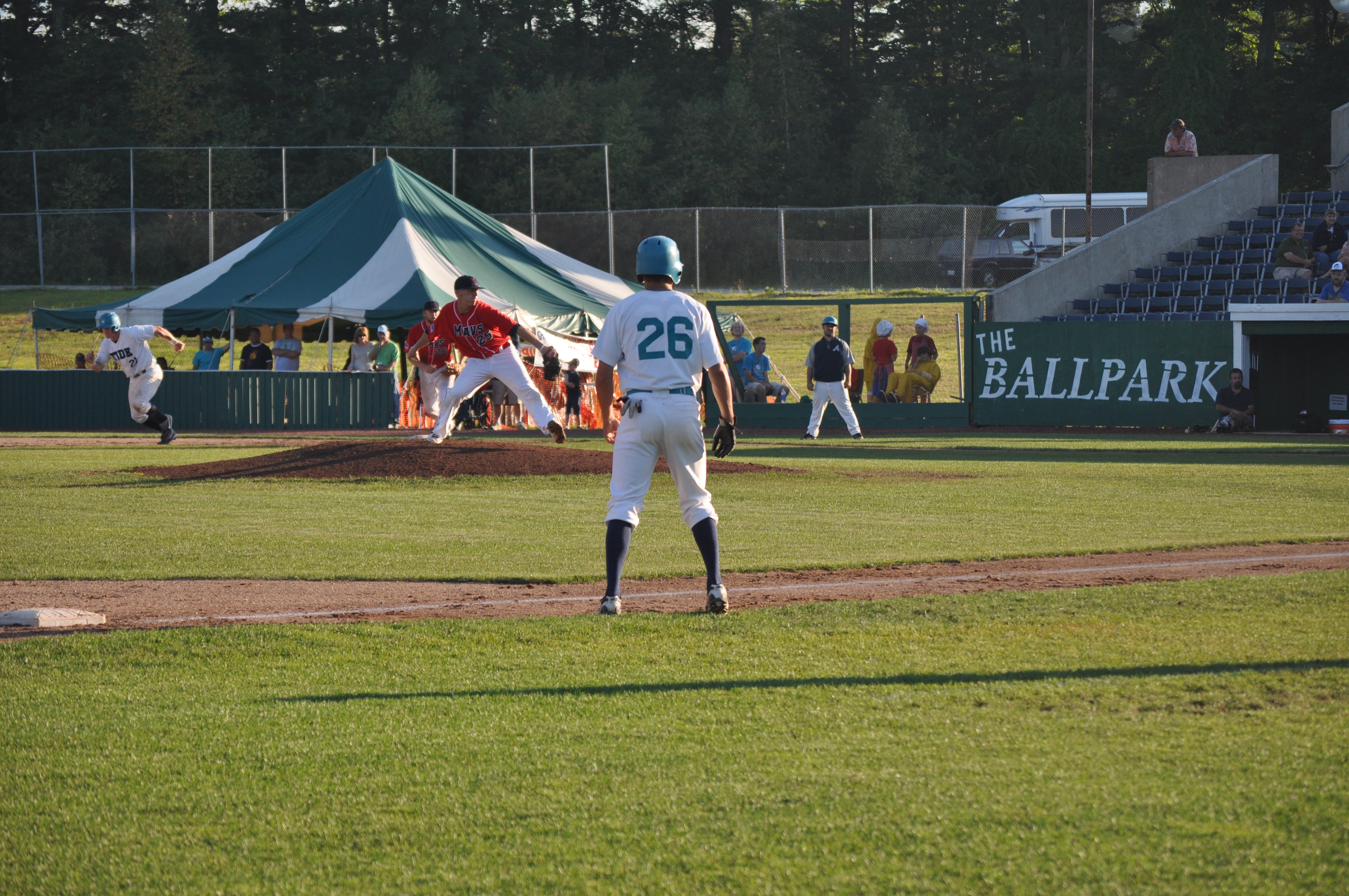

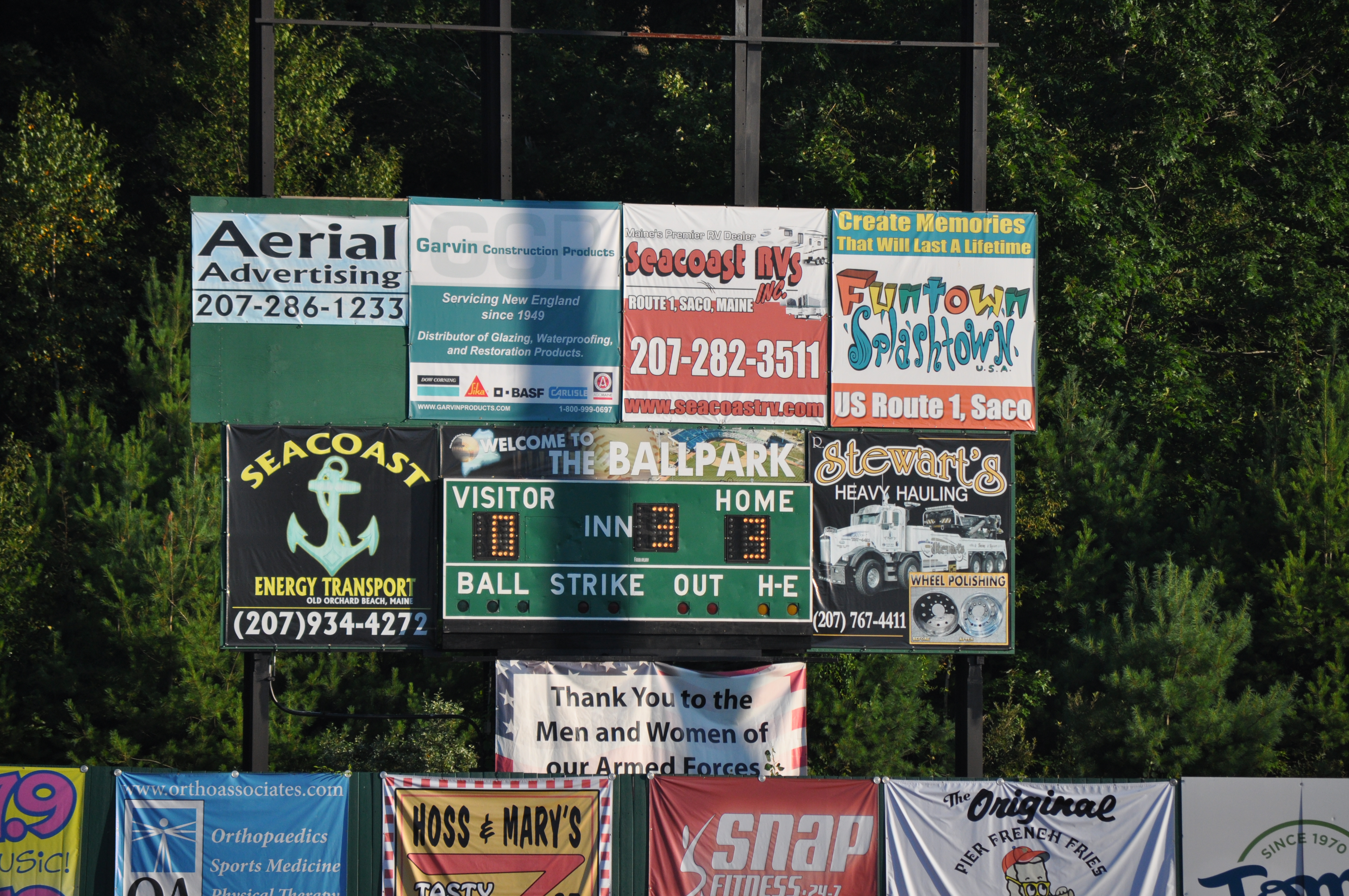
The park's scoreboard, located past the right field fence.
