= Luis Contreras (baseball) =

Venezuelan baseball player (born 1996)

- Pitcher
- Born: April 29, 1996 (age 30); Maracaibo, Venezuela
- Batted: Right Threw: Right

MLB debut
- June 23, 2024, for the Houston Astros

Last MLB appearance
- July 30, 2025, for the Houston Astros

MLB statistics
- Win–loss record: 0–0
- Earned run average: 7.50
- Strikeouts: 19
- Stats at Baseball Reference

Teams
- Houston Astros (2024–2025)

Luis Eduardo Contreras (born April 29, 1996) is a Venezuelan former professional baseball pitcher. He played in Major League Baseball (MLB) for the Houston Astros.

== Career ==
=== Puerto Rico Islanders ===
Contreras started his professional career in the Empire Professional Baseball League, playing for the Puerto Rico Islanders, and leading them to a league championship title in 2018 with a 3-1 record and 1.74 ERA over 57 innings.

=== Eastside Diamond Hoppers ===
After going unselected the 2019 Major League Baseball draft, Contreras signed with the Eastside Diamond Hoppers of the United Shore Professional Baseball League. In 5 games (4 starts), Contreras compiled a 2–2 record and 4.70 ERA with 39 strikeouts and one save across 23 innings pitched.

=== Milwaukee Brewers ===
On June 19, 2019, Contreras signed a minor league contract with the Milwaukee Brewers organization. He split the campaign between the rookie–level Arizona League Brewers, Single–A Wisconsin Timber Rattlers, and Double–A Biloxi Shuckers. In 16 games split between the three affiliates, Contreras accumulated a 4–4 record and 2.86 ERA with 73 strikeouts across 50 1/3 innings pitched. He did not play in a game in 2020 due to the cancellation of the minor league season because of the COVID-19 pandemic.

Contreras returned to action with Biloxi in 2021, but only made 3 starts in which he logged a 5.19 ERA with 19 strikeouts. In 2022, he made 35 appearances out of the bullpen for Biloxi and the Triple–A Nashville Sounds, compiling a 3.88 ERA with 73 strikeouts across 51 innings of work.

Contreras split the 2023 campaign between Biloxi and Nashville, making 39 total appearances and registering a 4–3 record and 4.55 ERA with 90 strikeouts across 63 1/3 innings. He elected free agency following the season on November 6, 2023.

=== Houston Astros ===
Contreras signed a minor league contract with the Houston Astros on November 26, 2023. In 19 games for the Triple–A Sugar Land Space Cowboys, he recorded a 1.40 ERA with 20 strikeouts across 19 1/3 innings pitched. On June 16, 2024, Contreras was selected to the 40-man roster and promoted to the major leagues for the first time. On June 21, he was optioned back to Triple–A, without having appeared for the Astros, and briefly became a phantom ballplayer. The following day, Contreras was recalled back to the major leagues. He made his MLB debut on June 23.

Contreras made nine appearances for Houston in 2025, struggling to a 6.75 ERA with 13 strikeouts over 12 innings of work. Contreras was designated for assignment by the Astros on August 7, 2025. He cleared waivers and was sent outright to Triple-A Sugar Land on August 9. Contreras elected free agency following the season on November 6.

On July 25, 2026, Contreras announced his retirement on his Instagram page.
