= North Country Baseball League =

- Sport: Baseball
- Founded: 2015
- Folded: 2015
- No. of teams: 4
- Country: United States
- Last champion: Newburgh Newts
- Website: Official site

The North Country Baseball League (NCBL) was an independent, professional baseball league located in the Northeastern region of the United States in 2015. Operating in cities not served by Major League Baseball or their minor-league affiliates, the NCBL had four franchise teams spread throughout the states of New York and Maine.

The league was originally proposed as the East Coast Baseball League and had six teams, four in the United States and two in Ontario, Canada. Right before the season started, the Watertown team pulled out over what they claimed were unfulfilled promised by the ECBL management. The other U.S.-based teams also pulled out and with Watertown formed the NCBL; the two Canadian teams then folded.

The NCBL had an unofficial affiliation with the Atlantic League of Professional Baseball, and several NCBL players were called up to the Atlantic League. The Newburgh Newts won the initial league championship series.

Three of the four teams that took part in the NCBL's lone season moved to the Empire Professional Baseball League for 2016.

== Teams ==
| Team | City | Stadium |
|---|---|---|
| Newburgh Newts | Traveling team* | |
| Old Orchard Beach Surge | Old Orchard Beach, Maine | The Ball Park |
| Road City Explorers | Traveling team** | |
| Watertown Bucks | Watertown, New York | Duffy Fairgrounds |

(*) Originally started as the Newburgh Newts, based at Delano-Hitch Stadium in Newburgh, New York, but the team left after three weeks due to lack of sponsorship or fan interest (brought on by poor scheduling). When league ownership had been informed that the check for the first months rent (paid by the ECBL) had in fact bounced, they choose to leave Newburgh.

(**) Operations based in Watertown, New York. The Explorers were in negotiations to play a limited home stand at Point Stadium in Johnstown, Pennsylvania, but the collapse of the ECBL halted the negotiations between the two. Moved to Rome, New York for 2016 season.

=== Originally proposed ECBL teams ===
| Team | City | Stadium |
|---|---|---|
| Niagara Wild | Welland, Ontario | Welland Stadium |
| Waterloo Whiskey Jacks | Waterloo, Ontario | Bechtel Park Stadium |
