= Road team =

Road team may refer to:

- Traveling team, member of a professional league that never competes in a home arena or stadium
- Away team (sports), team playing at opponent's home venue
