= Frontier Greys =

American professional baseball team

Information
- League: Frontier League (2013–2015)
- Founded: 2013
- Folded: 2015
- League championships: 0
- Division championships: 0
- Ownership: Frontier Baseball League

The Frontier Greys were a professional baseball team in the United States. The Greys were a member of the East Division of the Frontier League, an independent baseball league, from 2013 through 2015.

The Greys were a traveling team that did not have a home city or stadium. They were formed by the league in 2013 to replace the departing Road Warriors and maintain an even number of teams in the league. They were disbanded after the 2015 season when the folding of the Rockford Aviators removed the necessity for the team, as the league contracted from 14 to 12 teams.

The Greys' records during their three seasons were:

- 2013: 33–62 (.347) (manager Brent Metheny)
- 2014: 29–66 (.305) (manager Kyle Haines)
- 2015: 40–56 (.417) (manager Vinny Ganz)

== See also ==
- Empire State Greys, a similar team formed in 2022
