= Dominican Summer League Orioles =

Dominican Summer League Orioles Black
- San Antonio de Guerra

Minor league affiliations
- Class: Rookie
- League: Dominican Summer League
- Division: West Division

Major league affiliations
- Team: Baltimore Orioles

Minor league titles
- League titles (0): None

Team data
- Name: DSL Orioles Black
- Ballpark: Baltimore Orioles Dominican Academy
- Owner(s)/ Operator(s): Baltimore Orioles
- Manager: Elvis Morel

Dominican Summer League Orioles Orange
- San Antonio de Guerra

Minor league affiliations
- Class: Rookie
- League: Dominican Summer League
- Division: Central Division

Major league affiliations
- Team: Baltimore Orioles

Minor league titles
- League titles (0): None

Team data
- Name: DSL Orioles Orange
- Ballpark: Baltimore Orioles Dominican Academy
- Owner(s)/ Operator(s): Baltimore Orioles
- Manager: Chris Madera

The Dominican Summer League Orioles or DSL Orioles are a Minor League Baseball team of the Dominican Summer League and Rookie affiliates of the Baltimore Orioles. They are located in San Antonio de Guerra, Santo Domingo, Dominican Republic. Since 2019, the team has been split into two squads, DSL Orioles Black and DSL Orioles Orange.

== Rosters ==
Dominican Summer League Orioles Black roster
Players		Coaches/Other
Pitchers: -- Alberto Arias ‡; 49 Asael Arias; 83 Roynel Confidente; 21 Naykel Cruz; 48 Angel De Jesus; 87 Juan Duran; 88 Luis Espinoza; 90 Robinson Javier; 70 Esteban Luna; 71 Jainer Marmolejos; 65 Junior Medina; 47 Elías Moscoso; 0 Emmanuel Pena; 92 Victor Santos; 94 Laurens Sosa; 91 Raymond Sosa; 99 Darling Valencio; 53 Yunior Villavicencio	Catchers: 23 Jose Flores; 36 Victor Saez; 18 Manuel Vasquez; Infielders: 72 Frainner Chirinos; 2 José Peña; 7 Emilio Sanchez; 9 Ronald Terrero; 14 Cleudis Valenzuela; Outfielders: 39 Anthwan Brea; 32 Starlin Mieses; 40 Breiny Ramírez; 35 Alexander Rincon; 17 Lisandro Sanchez; 37 Argenis Valdez	Manager: -- Elvis Morel; Coaches: -- George Bell (hitting); -- Dionis Pascual (pitching); 60-day injured list: 80 Eriner Batista; 87 Esteban Dicent; 10 Saul Gomez; 96 Henry Tejada; 98 Eduardo Torres; 7-day injured list * On Baltimore Orioles 40-man roster ~ Development list # Rehab assignment ∞ Reserve list ‡ Restricted list § Suspended list † Temporarily inactive list Roster updated June 14, 2025 → More rosters: MiLB • Dominican Summer League → Baltimore Orioles minor league players

Dominican Summer League Orioles Orange roster
Players		Coaches/Other
Pitchers: -- Xavier Alvero ‡; 87 Salvador Casado; 27 Fabian Cordero; 84 David De Los Santos; 81 Alexander Diaz; 89 Ronal Herrera; 60 Edwin Marte; 38 Deimer Rodriguez; 78 Reykelli Rubi; 93 Ezequiel Sosa; 95 Rafael Suero; 97 Samuel Teran; 50 Esmerlyn Valenzuela; 76 Carlos Virla; 41 Santhony Vizcaino; 64 Kelvin Zapata	Catchers: 1 Yeison Acosta; 15 Christian Astudillo; 16 Ricardo Chirinos; 19 Juan Garcia; Infielders: 24 Meykel Baro; 67 Hector Campusano; 11 Jorge Drullard; 13 Frandy Guillen; 6 Jemone Nuel; 28 Jose Perez; Outfielders: 26 Abraham Cohen; 34 Enmanuel Corniel; 29 Angel Garcia; 30 Johanse Gomez; 31 Rayner Herrera	Manager: -- Chris Madera; Coaches: -- Ramon Lubo (fundamentals); 60-day injured list: 51 Benjamin Vasquez; 7-day injured list * On Baltimore Orioles 40-man roster ~ Development list # Rehab assignment ∞ Reserve list ‡ Restricted list § Suspended list † Temporarily inactive list Roster updated June 14, 2025 → More rosters: MiLB • Dominican Summer League → Baltimore Orioles minor league players
