= Aguada Explorers =

Logo
Cap insignia

Information
- League: Empire Professional Baseball League
- Location: Aguada, Puerto Rico
- Ballpark: Aguada Stadium
- Founded: 2015
- League championships: 1 (2016)
- Division championships: 1 (2015)
- Former name(s): Road City Explorers (2015); Sullivan Explorers (2016–2017)
- Former league(s): North Country Baseball League (2015)
- Former ballparks: Generals Park
- Manager: Joey Molina

The Aguada Explorers are an independent professional baseball team playing in the American Empire Professional Baseball League, which is not affiliated with Major League Baseball.

The team is currently based in the municipality of Aguada, Puerto Rico, previously playing out of the cities of Rome and Loch Sheldrake in New York.

== History ==
In 2015 the Road City Explorers were set to be a member of the East Coast Baseball League. The team was to be managed by Spencer Trygg. Prior to the planned start of the ECBL's first season the American-based teams, including the Explorers, pulled out of the league to form the North Country Baseball League. The restructuring resulted in the Explorers being taken over by Eddie Gonzalez as manager and Robert Babiak as general manager.

In 2016, they joined the EPBL, set to play out of Rome, New York. In 2017, the Explorers played at Generals Park on the campus of Sullivan County Community College.

=== 2015 season ===
The Explorers led the upstart league with a 22-17 record. The Explorers promoted eight players to the Atlantic League and American Association. Brian Hoover, a 38-year old rookie, made headlines as he signed with the Explorers mid-season.

=== 2016 season ===
The Explorers were originally announced to move to Rome, New York and play in the newly-formed Empire Professional Baseball League, until the franchise settled in Sullivan County.

Mired in third place in the four-team EPBL, the Explorers won their last eight games, slipped into second place and qualified for the best-of-three championship series against the Watertown Bucks, who won both halves of the regular season with a 35-21 overall record. Despite the fact that the series was held in Watertown, the Explorers swept the Bucks, 8-6 and 8-7, to take the 2016 Empire League championship. It marked the second time a team from Sullivan County won a pro baseball title, and the first since the Catskill Cougars in 1996. Jevon Jackson was named MVP of the championship series.

=== 2018 season ===
The Explorers will be playing games in Aguada, Puerto Rico.

== Season-by-season ==
Season	W	L	Win%	Result	Playoffs
2015	22	17	.564	1st (tie) of 4	Lost semifinals vs Watertown Bucks 1-2 (best-of 3)
2016	28	28	.500	2nd of 4	League champion - defeated New York Bucks 2-0 (best-of 3)
2017	23	35	.397	4th of 4	DNQ
2018				TBD	TBD
