= Empire State Greys =

American professional baseball team

- Logo

Information
- League: Frontier League (East Division)
- Ballpark: None
- Founded: 2022
- Folded: 2023
- Colors: Grey, Black and Green
- Website: empirestategreys.com

The Empire State Greys were a professional baseball team in the United States. The Greys were a member of the East Division of the Frontier League, an independent baseball league serving as an official Major League Baseball (MLB) Partner League. The team's nickname of "greys" referenced the grey baseball uniforms traditionally worn by visiting teams, in contrast to the white uniforms traditionally worn by home teams.

== History ==
The Greys were formed prior to the 2022 Frontier League season, due to the Southern Illinois Miners ceasing operations after the 2021 season, in order to maintain an even number of teams in the league. The Greys competed as a traveling team, with a roster of players from the Empire Professional Baseball League.

During 2022, the team struggled to a 6–90 win–loss record, a .063 winning percentage. The Greys also competed during the 2023 Frontier League season, posting a record of 18–77 (.189). The Grays did not return for the 2024 Frontier League season, as the New England Knockouts joined the league, removing the need for a traveling team to provide an even number of teams.

== See also ==
- Frontier Greys, a similar team in the Frontier League during 2013–2015
- The Grays, a similar team in the Canadian American Association of Professional Baseball that played on multiple occasions
- Road Warriors (Atlantic League), a similar team that played in the Atlantic League of Professional Baseball on multiple occasions
