= Saranac Lake Surge =

American independent professional baseball team

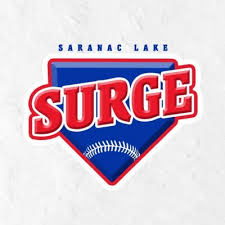
Logo
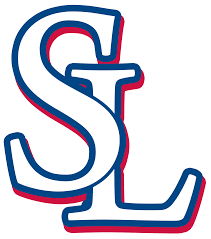
Cap insignia

Information
- League: Empire Professional Baseball League
- Location: Saranac Lake, New York
- Ballpark: Saranac Lake Central Field
- Founded: 2015
- League championships: 2021
- Former name: Old Orchard Beach Surge
- Former leagues: East Coast Baseball League (2015); North Country Baseball League (2015)
- Former ballpark: The Old Orchard Beach Ball Park
- Website: Official website

The Saranac Lake Surge are an independent American professional baseball team based in Saranac Lake, New York. The Surge play in the Empire Professional Baseball League, which is not affiliated with Major League Baseball.

== History ==
In 2015, the Surge was set to be a member of the East Coast Baseball League. The team was to be managed by Scott "Skip" Nathanson. Prior to the planned start of the ECBL's first season the American teams, including the Surge, pulled out of the league to form the North Country Baseball League. For its first four years of existence, the team was based in Old Orchard Beach, Maine.

=== 2015 season ===
The Surge posted a record of 18–21 in the startup league. The Surge promoted ten players to the Atlantic League, the American Association, and the Frontier League.

=== 2016 season ===
The Surge were announced to play in the newly formed Empire Baseball League. On December 22, Skip Nathanson and Alex Markakis agreed to terms to return for the 2016 season.

=== 2019 season ===
The Surge relocated to Saranac Lake, New York, for the 2019 season. On July 4, 2019, they played their first game in Saranac Lake versus the Road City Explorers.

=== 2020 season ===
The Empire League did not hold a traditional season due to COVID-19.

=== 2021 season ===
The Surge finished the regular season with a 27-20 record to capture the top seed in the playoffs and then defeated the Plattsburgh Thunderbirds, 3 games to 2, to win the Zacari Cup. Former Plattsburgh State Head Coach Kris Doorey managed the Surge. Pitcher Shawn McFeggan was named the "EBL Starter of the Year" and AJ Wright earned the "Matt Joyce Slugger of the Year". Jessel Soto earned the Zacari Cup Finals Most Valuable Player.

=== Players ===
Players promoted to higher independent leagues
| Player | Pos | Team | League |
|---|---|---|---|
| Yeicok Calderon | OF | York Revolution | Atlantic League |
| Scott Heath | LHP | Joplin Blasters | American Association |
| Tommy Lawrence | RHP | River City Rascals | Frontier League |
| Eddie Medina | RHP | Wichita Wingnuts | American Association |
| Ron Schreurs | LHP | York Revolution | Atlantic League |
| Luis Pardo | RHP | Wichita Wingnuts | American Association |
| Tucker White | OF | Joplin Blasters | American Association |
| Joe Coyne | C | Joplin Blasters | American Association |
| Kenny Kirshner | OF | Schaumberg Bombers | Frontier League |
| Sam DiMatteo | OF | Long Island Ducks | Atlantic League |
| Shawn McFeggan | LHP | York Revolution | Atlantic League |
| Joey Lara | RHP | York Revolution | Atlantic League |
| Ryan Dickt | C | Southern Maryland Blue Crabs | Atlantic League |
| Kyle Robinson | OF | New Jersey Jackals | Frontier League |
| Jordan Rhodes | RHP | Empire State Greys | Frontier League |
| AJ Wright | IF | Empire State Greys | Frontier League |
