= New York Bucks =

American baseball team

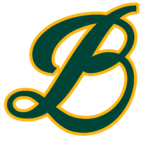
- Logo

Information
- League: Empire Professional Baseball League
- Location: Plattsburgh, New York
- Ballpark: Lefty Wilson Field
- Founded: 2015
- Former league: North Country Baseball League (2015)
- Colors
- Manager: Ernesto Punales

The New York Bucks are an independent American professional baseball team based in Canton, New York. They are a member of the Empire Professional Baseball League. Beginning in the 2018 season, the Bucks will play their home games at the Roos House Athletic Center at SUNY Canton.

== History ==
The Watertown Bucks were an independent American professional baseball team based in Watertown, New York. The Bucks played in the newly formed Empire Professional Baseball League, which is not affiliated with Major League Baseball, during its inaugural season. The Bucks played in the North Country Baseball League in 2015. They were previously a member of the short-lived East Coast Baseball League.

In 2015, the Bucks were set to be a member of the East Coast Baseball League. The team was owned by Bruce Zicari and was to be managed by Kelly Stinnett. General Manager and NCBL Executive was Matt McClusky. Prior to the planned start of the ECBL's first season the American teams, including the Bucks, pulled out of the league to form the North Country Baseball League.

=== 2015 season ===
The Bucks posted a record of 16-23 in the start-up league. The Bucks promoted no players to the higher Independent Leagues. The team drew 9,250 fans, for an average of 237 a game. The team played its first game against the Road City Explorers on Memorial Day.

=== 2016 season ===
The Bucks were announced to play in the newly formed Empire Professional Baseball League. The Bucks announced Simon Walters as manager January 5. The Empire League named Kyle Scodo as general manager and operations manager of the Watertown Bucks on January 12. It was reported that Bruce Zicari would no longer own the team in 2016, and that it would be owned by the league. On January 26, Watertown Superintendent of Park and Recreation, Erin Gardner, endorsed the Empire League's offer to sign an franchise agreement. The Empire League Director stated with regards to the team that league will have "all the money in place before the season ever begins". After finishing the season, the Bucks lost their lease for the stadium and ceased operations.

=== 2018 season ===
The franchise was revived for the 2018 season as the league expanded from 4 to 6 teams. The revived team was originally to be based in Georgetown, Delaware, but a reworking of the schedule to accommodate playing games in Puerto Rico resulted in the franchise being based in Canton, New York, instead. Finishing with a league-leading 32-16 record, the Bucks advanced to the postseason, losing the championship series to the Puerto Rico Islanders two games to one.

=== 2019 season ===
The 2019 Bucks relocated to Plattsburgh and finished last in the league with a 3-29 record.
