= San Antonio de Guerra =

- San Antonio de Guerra in the Dominican Republic
- Coordinates: 18°33′0″N 69°42′0″W
- Country: Dominican Republic
- Province: Santo Domingo

Area
  - Total: 288.25 km^{2} (111.29 sq mi)

Population (2012)
  - Total: 102,586
  - Density: 355.89/km^{2} (921.76/sq mi)
  - Urban: 59,631
- Municipal Districts: 1

San Antonio de Guerra is a municipality (municipio) of the Santo Domingo province in the Dominican Republic. Within the municipality there is one municipal district (distrito municipal): Hato Viejo.

For comparison with other municipalities and municipal districts see the list of municipalities and municipal districts of the Dominican Republic.
