= North Country Thunderbirds =

Professional baseball team in New York

- Logo

Information
- League: Empire Professional Baseball League
- Location: Plattsburgh, New York
- Ballpark: Salmon River Central School
- Founded: 2017
- League championships: 2017, 2019
- Former ballpark: Lyon Mountain Citizens Ballpark (2021) Chip Cummings Field (2017-22) Veterans Park at Post 1619 (2023)
- Colors: Black, red, gold, white
- General manager: TBA
- Manager: TBA
- Website: plattsburghthunderbirds.com

The North Country Thunderbirds, previously known as the Plattsburgh Redbirds, are an independent American professional baseball team based in Plattsburgh, New York. They play in the Empire Professional Baseball League, which is not affiliated with Major League Baseball.

== History ==
In November 2016, the Plattsburgh Redbirds joined the Empire Professional Baseball League. They played at Chip Cummings Field, on the campus of the State University of New York at Plattsburgh. The Redbirds' name was a play on words with SUNY Plattsburgh's mascot, the Cardinals. In March 2019, the team was renamed the Plattsburgh Thunderbirds. In 2019, the Thunderbirds played home games at Chip Cummings Field and Lefty Wilson Field. In 2023, the Thunderbirds played home games at Chip Cummings Field and Veterans Park at Post 1619. In 2024, the Thunderbirds played their home games at Salmon River Central School.

The Redbirds/Thunderbirds have had the following managers:

Joe Winklesas (2017), Selwyn Young (2018), Sam Quinn-Loeb (2021-23), Hiroki Litima (2024).

=== Players ===
Players promoted to affiliated baseball
Player	Pos	Team
Josh Ferro	C	Houston Astros
Gavin Stupienski	C	Kansas City Royals
