= Empire Professional Baseball League =

Independent baseball league

Empire League
- Current season, competition or edition: 2026 EPBL season
- Classification: Independent
- Sport: Baseball
- Founded: 2015
- No. of teams: 4
- Country: United States
- Most recent champion: Malone Border Hounds (2026)
- Most titles: Malone Border Hounds (3)
- Website: EmpireProLeague.com

The Empire Professional Baseball League (EPBL) is an independent baseball league that began play in 2016. The Empire League plays a 40-game regular season followed by a five-game post season. The five-team league consists exclusively of teams based in Upstate New York and presents themselves as a developmental league affiliated with the Frontier League. League offices are in Tampa, Florida.

== History ==
Original logo of the EPBL.

The Empire League is a replacement of the North Country Baseball League, which folded after one season (and was itself a last-minute replacement for the East Coast Baseball League, which disbanded before the start of the 2015 season). The league fielded four teams based in the states of New York, New Hampshire and Maine for its inaugural season.

It is a low-budget league meant to give players recently graduated from college or with little professional experience an opportunity at staying in shape and providing them the chance at being signed to higher level league contracts with affiliated or independent teams. All league funding comes from advertisement sales, ticket sales and tryout revenue.

The league is operated by Eddie Gonzalez, former professional baseball player and NAIA All-American at Webber International University. Gonzalez is also a former NCBL executive.

The Sullivan Explorers, despite finishing the regular season with a losing record, won the 2016 league championship over the regular season winner Watertown Bucks.

Prior to the league's second season, the Watertown Bucks lost the lease to their stadium and were replaced by the Plattsburgh Redbirds. The New Hampshire Wild ceased operations and were replaced by a team from Puerto Rico; however, since a stadium deal in Puerto Rico had not yet been finalized, the team played the 2017 season as a travel team.

The league expanded to six teams for the 2018 season with two new franchises selected from four of the nine interested parties visited in 2017. On February 23, 2018, the league announced that one team will be a revival of the New Hampshire Wild, and the sixth team would be the return of the New York Bucks, formerly known as the Watertown Bucks.

On May 31, 2018, the league announced the Puerto Rico Islanders will play in Rincon, Puerto Rico, and the Sullivan Explorers would be known as the Aguada Explorers. For 2019, the Explorers would become a traveling team, and the Surge would move to Saranac Lake, New York.

Due to Covid-19, the 2020 Empire Professional Baseball League was held at Consol Energy Park in Washington, Pennsylvania.

In 2021, the Empire Professional Baseball League returned to normal operating procedures with the following teams: the Saranac Lake Surge, the Tupper Lake Riverpigs, the Plattsburgh Thunderbirds and the New Hampshire Wild.

In 2022, the New Hampshire Wild were replaced by the Japan Islanders, a traveling team composed of mostly native Japanese players.

The 2023 season saw the league expand to five teams with the addition of the Malone Border Hounds.

The 2024 season saw the Japan Islanders leave the Empire League, while the Plattsburgh Thunderbirds rebranded to the North County Thunderbirds. Luis Contreras became the first Empire Baseball League alum to be promoted to the major leagues when he was recalled by the Houston Astros June 23, 2024. Contreras pitched for the Puerto Rico Islanders in 2018, recording a 3-1 record with a 1.74 earned-run average in 57 innings.

In February 2025, the league announced that the Los Angeles Bullies would be joining the league. They are a travel team and will not play in Los Angeles.

== Teams ==
Locations of Empire Professional Baseball League teams in the Northeast

Team	First season	City	Stadium
Malone Border Hounds	2023	Malone, New York	American Legion Post 219 Veterans Field
North Country Thunderbirds	2017	Fort Covington, New York	Salmon River Park
Saranac Lake Surge	2016	Saranac Lake, New York	Petrova Field
Tupper Lake Riverpigs	2020	Tupper Lake, New York	Municipal Park
Los Angeles Bullies	2025	Travel Team	Travel Team

== Champions ==
Year	Champion	Runner-up	Result
2016	Sullivan Explorers	Watertown Bucks	2–0 (best-of 3)
2017	Plattsburgh Redbirds	Old Orchard Beach Surge	3–1 (best-of 5)
2018	Puerto Rico Islanders	New York Bucks	2–1 (best-of 3)
2019	Plattsburgh Thunderbirds	New Hampshire Wild	2–0 (best-of 3)
2020	Baseball Brilliance Sox	Saranac Lake Surge	1–0 (single game final)
2021	Saranac Lake Surge	Plattsburgh Thunderbirds	3–0 (best-of 5)
2022	Tupper Lake Riverpigs	Plattsburgh Thunderbirds	3–2 (best-of 5)
2023	Malone Border Hounds	Plattsburgh Thunderbirds	2–0 (best-of 3)
2024	Tupper Lake Riverpigs	North Country Thunderbirds	2–0 (best-of 3)
2025	Malone Border Hounds	Tupper Lake Riverpigs	3–0 (best-of 5)
2026	Malone Border Hounds	Tupper Lake Riverpigs	14–6 (single game final)

== See also ==
- Empire State Greys, a traveling team of EPBL players formed in 2022 to compete in the Frontier League
