= Independent baseball league =

Genre of professional baseball in the United States and Canada

Independent baseball leagues
- Classification: Minor professional
- Sport: Baseball
- Founded: 1993
- No. of teams: 101
- Countries: United States and Canada
- Most titles: Québec Capitales (10 titles)

An independent baseball league is a professional baseball league in the United States or Canada that is not overseen by Major League Baseball or its affiliated Minor League Baseball system (historically referred to as organized baseball).

Independent leagues have flourished in northeastern states, where dense populations can often support multiple franchises. Because they are not subject to the territorial limitations imposed on affiliated minor-league teams, independent clubs can relocate as close to affiliated teams (and one another) as they choose to. For example, the city of Lancaster, Pennsylvania, cannot have an affiliated team because of its proximity to the Harrisburg Senators and Reading Fightin Phils, leaving the Atlantic League to place a team—the Lancaster Stormers—to fill the void. Another example is the greater New York City metropolitan area, where there are many independent teams: the Long Island Ducks, Staten Island FerryHawks, New Jersey Jackals, New York Boulders, and Sussex County Miners.

The Atlantic League is considered as the top level of competition among the independent leagues, comparable to Double-A, and has had more marquee players than any other independent league, including Jose Canseco, Mat Latos, Steve Lombardozzi Jr., Francisco Rodríguez, Chien-Ming Wang, Roger Clemens, Rich Hill, Scott Kazmir, Juan González, John Rocker, Nick Senzel, and Dontrelle Willis. Two former Atlantic League players are in the National Baseball Hall of Fame and Museum, Tim Raines and Rickey Henderson. Gary Carter, another Hall of Famer, managed in the league. The Atlantic League has had many notable managers and coaches, including Wally Backman, Frank Viola, Tommy John, Sparky Lyle, and Bud Harrelson. The Northern League alumni include Leon "Bull" Durham, J. D. Drew, and Darryl Strawberry.

== History ==
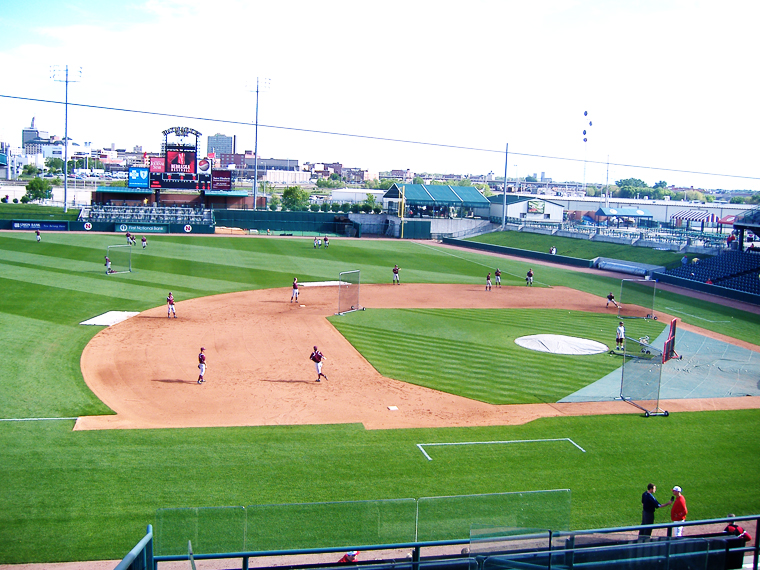
Haymarket Park, home to the Lincoln Saltdogs, an independent baseball team in Lincoln, Nebraska

Independent leagues are those professional leagues in the United States and Canada not under the purview of organized Minor League Baseball and the Commissioner of Baseball. Independent baseball existed in the early 20th century and has become prominent again since 1993.

Leagues operated mostly autonomously before 1902, when the majority joined the NAPBL. From then until 1915, a total of eight new and existing leagues remained independent. Most joined the National Association after one season of independence. Notable exceptions were the California League, which was independent in 1902 and from 1907 to 1909; the United States Baseball League, which folded during its independent 1912 season; and the Colonial League, a National Association Member that went independent in 1915 and then folded. Another independent league, the Federal League, played at a level considered major league from 1914 to 1915.

Few independent leagues existed between 1915 and 1993. Major exceptions included the Carolina League and the Quebec-based Provincial League. The Carolina League, based in the North Carolina Piedmont region, gained a reputation as a notorious "outlaw league" during its existence from 1936 to 1938. The Provincial League fielded six teams across Quebec and was independent from 1948 to 1949. Similarly to early 20th-century independent leagues, it joined the National Association in 1950, playing for six more years.. The Empire State League attempted an independent league which played in Hempstead Long Island, New York in 1987 and folded during its second season in 1988.

Independent leagues saw new growth after 1992, after the new Professional Baseball Agreement in organized baseball instituted more stringent revenue and stadium requirements on members. The Northern League and Frontier League both started play in 1993, and the Northern League's success paved the way for other independent leagues like the Texas-Louisiana League and Northeast League. Over the next eight years, at least 16 independent leagues formed, of which six existed in 2002. As of the 2024 season, there were seven active leagues, with four of them acting as MLB Partner Leagues. In 2026, the Canadian Baseball League converted from being semi-professional to fully professional, the Women's Pro Baseball League was founded, and the Savannah Bananas officially established their own stand-alone league bringing the total number of independent leagues to ten.

Major League Baseball also co-operatively operates the MLB Draft League, which operates as an amateur collegiate summer baseball league in the first half of each season and a professional league outside of the structure of Minor League Baseball for the remainder.

Additionally, there two American teams that play in primarily Mexican leagues that are currently independent from Major League Baseball. The Tecolotes de los Dos Laredos of the Mexican Baseball League (which was formerly associated with Minor League Baseball) split their seasons playing home games across the border in Nuevo Laredo, Mexico and Laredo, Texas. The Tucson LMP baseball team plays in the winter Mexican Pacific League, but due to issues with work visas, has yet to play a game at their intended home stadium in Tucson, Arizona.

== Current leagues ==
Overview of current independent baseball leagues
Affiliation	League	First season	Teams	Geographical area
MLB Showcase; League	MLB Draft League	2021	6	Mid-Atlantic
MLB Partner; Leagues	American Association of Professional Baseball	2006	10	Midwest, Manitoba
MLB Partner; Leagues	Atlantic League of Professional Baseball	1998	9	Mid-Atlantic, Southeast
MLB Partner; Leagues	National Association of Professional Baseball	1993	20	Northeast, Midwest, South, Central Canada
MLB Partner; Leagues	Pioneer Baseball League	1939	12	Northern Mountain States, California
Independent	Canadian Baseball League	1919	9	Southern Ontario
Independent	Empire Professional Baseball League	2016	4	Upstate New York
Independent	Pecos League	2011	15	California, Southwest, Southern Mountain States, Great Plains
Independent	United Shore Professional Baseball League	2016	4	Utica, Michigan
Independent (women's baseball)	Women's Pro Baseball League	2026	4	Springfield, Illinois
Independent (Banana Ball)	Banana Ball Championship League	2026	6	Barnstorming league

- American Association
- Atlantic League
- National Association
- Pioneer League
- Empire League
- Pecos League
- United Shore League
- Canadian Baseball League
- MLB Draft League
- Women's Pro League

== Defunct leagues ==
Overview of former independent baseball leagues
League	First season	Last season	Geographical area
All-American Association	2001		Southern United States
Arizona–Mexico League	2003	2003	Arizona, Mexico
Atlantic Coast League	1995		Southeastern United States
Big South League	1996	1997	Arkansas, Mississippi, Tennessee
Canadian American Association of Professional Baseball	2005	2019	Northeast, Quebec, Ontario
Canadian Baseball League	2003	2003	Canada
Carolina League	1936	1938	North Carolina's Piedmont region
Central Baseball League	1994	2005	Southern United States
Continental Baseball League	2007	2010	Southwestern United States
Empire State League	1987		New York
Freedom Pro Baseball League	2012	2013	Arizona
Golden Baseball League	2005	2010	Hawaii, Western United States, Western Canada, Mexico
Golden State League	1995		California
Great Central League	1994		Upper Midwest
Heartland League	1996	1998	Midwestern United States, Northeastern United States, Southeastern United States
Inter-American League	1978	1979	United States, Dominican Republic, Panama, Puerto Rico, Venezuela
Mid-America League	1995		Midwestern United States
Mount Rainier Professional Baseball League	2015		Washington, Oregon, Montana
North Atlantic League	1995	1996	Northeastern United States, Canada
North American League	2011	2012	Western United States, Texas, Illinois, Canada
North Central League	1994	1995	Upper Midwest, Canada
North Country Baseball League	2015		New York, Maine
Northeast League	1995	2004	Northeastern United States, Canada
Northern League	1993	2010	Upper Midwest, Kansas, Canada
Pacific Association	2013	2019	California
Prairie League	1995	1997	Upper Midwest, Canada
South Coast League	2007		Southeastern United States
Southeastern League	2002	2003	Southeastern United States
Southwest Baseball League	1995	1997	Southwestern United States
Thoroughbred Baseball League	2017		Kentucky
United League Baseball	2006	2014	Texas
Western Baseball League	1995	2002	Pacific States

== Outside of North America ==
Map of independent baseball leagues and teams in Japan
Shikoku Island League Plus
Baseball Challenge League

In Japan, the Japan Independent Baseball League Organization, which consists of the Shikoku Island League Plus and Baseball Challenge League, operates independently from Nippon Professional Baseball (NPB). Japan also has a variety of independent semi-professional leagues consisting of industrial teams, where players are fulltime employees of the company that own and operate the team. South Korea also has series of small independent leagues.

A select number of Japanese independent teams also participate in the off-season Miyazaki Phoenix League alongside Japanese and Korean minor league teams. An all-star team of Japanese independent and industrial league players was invited to participate at the 2025 Caribbean Series under the moniker of the Japan Breeze.

Overview of Japanese independent baseball leagues
League	First season	Teams	Geographical area
Shikoku Island League Plus	2005	4	Shikoku
Baseball Challenge League	2006	9	Chūbu, Kantō, Tōhoku

== See also ==
- List of professional baseball leagues
- List of baseball teams in Canada (including leagues)
