= Traveling team =

Type of sports team

In professional team sports, a traveling team (also called a road team) is a member of a professional league that never competes in a home arena or stadium. This differs from a barnstorming team as a barnstorming team competes in exhibition games and not within a league or association framework as a traveling team does. While leagues may designate a traveling team prior to the start of competition, some teams become road teams by simply not scheduling any home games.

While the use of traveling teams has been sparing on the upper levels of professional sports in recent times, the National Football League had such road teams (such as the Hammond Pros, Oorang Indians, and Columbus Panhandles) in the formative years of the league. Recently, such teams have been almost invariably associated with minor leagues.

== Traveling teams in major professional American football ==
Below is a list of the traveling teams that were members of the National Football League, the first American Football League, or the second American Football League. No other major professional league of American football had such road teams, the last of which was the 1952 Dallas Texans of the National Football League. To qualify for the list, the team must have played a complete season of at least four games on the road. Teams that had the traveling team status imposed upon them in midseason are noted.

- Columbus Panhandles – 1920–1922 (two home games out of 22 played)
- Hammond Pros – 1920–1924 (one home game out of 24; became Akron Pros in 1925)
- Rochester Jeffersons – 1920, 1925 (no home games these two seasons – team active in NFL 1920–1925)
- Cincinnati Celts – 1921 (no home games out of four)
- Oorang Indians – 1922–1923 (one home game out of 20)
- Columbus Tigers – 1924–1926 (two home games out of 24)
- Dayton Triangles – 1924–1929 (three home games out of 42)
- Kansas City Blues – 1925 (no home games out of eight)
- Los Angeles Buccaneers – 1926 (actually based in Chicago; no home games out of 10)
- Louisville Colonels – 1926 (no home games out of four)
- Los Angeles Wildcats (AFL I) – 1926 (based in Moline, Illinois; no home games out of 14, played one designated "home game" in Toronto and also had a post-season "home stand" in California in early 1927)
- Rock Island Independents (AFL) – 1926 (after three games at home, became a traveling team, playing remaining six games on the road)
- Duluth Eskimos – 1927 (no home games out of nine)
- Brooklyn Tigers (AFL II) – 1936 (sole home game as Brooklyn Tigers was moved from Ebbets Field to Yankee Stadium for a game with the New York Yankees; Tigers moved to Rochester for first actual home game (at Silver Stadium), then folded. Team played seven games total.)
- Dallas Texans – 1952 (after drawing poorly in five home games, the NFL declared them a road team, with one designated "home game" in Akron, Ohio. The last five games were on the road)

There have been no NFL traveling teams since 1952, owing to the increased stability of the league. Even in cases when an NFL team's home stadium has been rendered unusable due to damages or renovations, the teams have arranged and designated temporary home stadiums in each case and no NFL team has had to play more than two designated home games (out of eight in a season) outside their home stadium.

In the Canadian Football League, the Las Vegas Posse were converted to a road team near the end of the 1994 season, their sole season in the league because of low attendance.

== Traveling teams in baseball ==
Traveling teams have existed at many times in baseball history, even into the 21st century. Traveling teams are periodically used by independent baseball leagues to maintain an even number of teams for scheduling purposes. Examples include The Aces of the Northeast League, the Road Warriors of the Atlantic League and Futures Collegiate Baseball League, the Frontier Greys and Empire State Greys of the Frontier League, and The Grays of the Can-Am League.

In 1994, after a roof collapse occurred at the Kingdome, the Seattle Mariners of Major League Baseball (MLB) were forced to play the remainder of the season on the road after the players' union rejected a number of proposed temporary homes. However, the season was cut short due to a player's strike, which resulted in the Mariners playing only 20 games as a road team.

How home-field advantage is administered to a traveling team in baseball varies by league. In the case of the Atlantic League, the Road Warriors never received home-field advantage in any game. In MLB, a team is guaranteed "designated home team" status for half of its scheduled games. Home-field advantage is particularly important in baseball, as the designated home team bats second.
