= London Rippers =

Logo
Cap insignia

Information
- League: Frontier League
- Location: London, Ontario
- Ballpark: Labatt Park
- Founded: 2007
- Disbanded: 2012
- League championships: 0
- Division championships: 0
- Former name: London Rippers (2012); Oakland County Cruisers (2010); Midwest Sliders of Ypsilanti (2009); Midwest Sliders (2008); Slippery Rock Sliders (2007)
- Former ballparks: Oestrike Stadium; Jack Critchfield Park
- Colours: Black, red, silver, white
- Ownership: Summit Professional Baseball
- Website: londonprobaseball.com

The London Rippers were a professional baseball team based in London, Ontario, in Canada. The Rippers were a member of the Frontier League, which is not affiliated with Major League Baseball. They played their home games at Labatt Park, and were the second Frontier League team to play their home games in London, following the London Werewolves, which played from 1999 (when they won the Frontier League Championship) until folding in 2001.

The franchise was founded as the original Slippery Rock Sliders in 2007. (The name "Slippery Rock Sliders" was later used by a summer collegiate baseball team of the Prospect League.) The team was renamed Midwest Sliders in 2008 and played as a traveling team for that season. It was renamed again to Midwest Sliders of Ypsilanti in 2009 and relocated to Ypsilanti, Michigan. The team was renamed again to Oakland County Cruisers in 2010. The franchise was resurrected in 2012 and became the "Rippers".

On July 24, 2012, it was announced that the Rippers would cease all operations as of midnight July 25, 2012.

== Controversy ==
The choice of the name and mascot proved controversial with some, as it was a reference to Jack the Ripper, a serial killer who murdered at least 5 women in London, England in the late 19th century. Megan Walker, director of a local London Abused Women's Center stated that "People are outraged. I think it's appalling. It's insulting and stupid and they better rethink their entire marketing strategy". Mayor Joe Fontana seemed uneasy about the team name but stated there is little the council can do to prevent the team from playing in Labatt Park, which is city owned.

The name choice was defended by Rush Limbaugh, Rick Chandler of NBC Sports, Ryan Mahan of the State Journal-Register and comedian Adam Buckley, briefly the team's PA announcer in 2012, who supported the logo as well as the name.

== 2012 season ==
The London Rippers opened their season against the Southern Illinois Miners. After a 1–5 start on their first road trip, London played their first game at Labatt Memorial Park on May 25, 2012 against the Gateway Grizzlies, winning 4–3.

== Eviction and folding ==
On July 18, 2012, an eviction notice was posted on the door of the London Rippers' Team Store in Market Tower, which was later attributed to their failure to pay rent. This led to the Frontier League stepping in to work with owner Othman Kadry and widespread speculation that the team's future was in jeopardy. Six days later, on July 24, 2012, it was first announced that the team would play the remainder of their season on the road, but was announced later in the day that the team would be folding altogether.

The Frontier League later announced on July 25, 2012 that the franchise will be replaced by a traveling team called the "Road Warriors"; the name was previously used by the Atlantic League of Professional Baseball. Teams originally scheduled to play in London instead hosted the Road Warriors.
