= London Majors =

Minor league baseball team based in London, Ontario

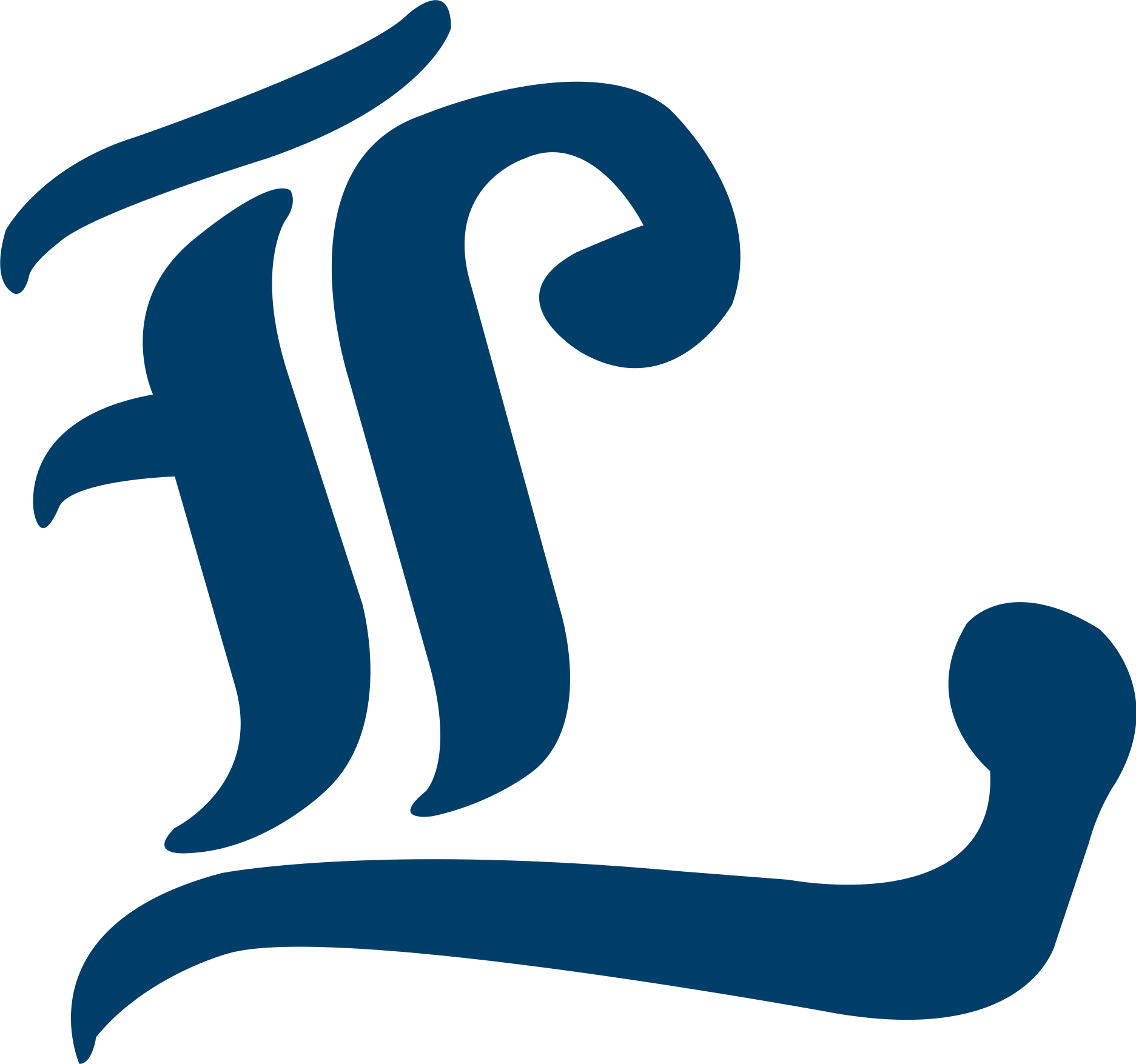
Logo
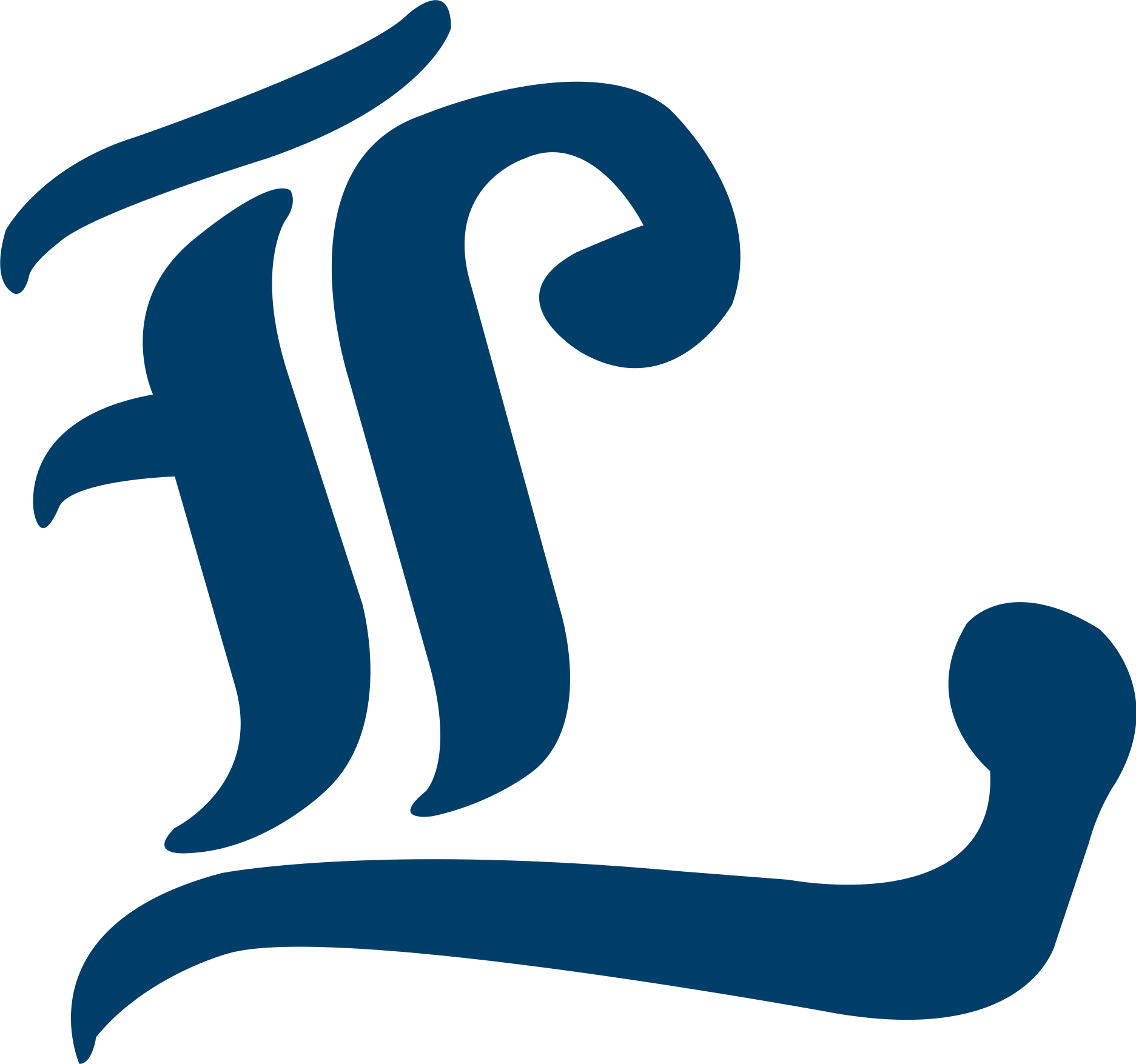
Cap insignia

Information
- League: Canadian Baseball League
- Location: London, Ontario
- Ballpark: Labatt Memorial Park
- Founded: 1925
- League championships: 14: 1925; 1936; 1937; 1943; 1944; 1945; 1947; 1948; 1951; 1956; 1969; 1975; 2021; 2022
- Colours: Black, white
- Ownership: Scott Dart and Roop Chanderdat
- Manager: Roop Chanderdat
- Media: Rogers TV London, London Majors TV on YouTube
- Website: www.londonmajors.com

The London Majors are an independent, professional baseball team of the Canadian Baseball League. The team was founded in 1925, and is based in London, Ontario. They play their home games at the 5,200 seat Labatt Memorial Park.

== Team history ==
Over the years, the team has also been known at various times as the London Braves (1925), the London Winery (1934–1936), the London Silverwoods (1937, 1938), the London Army Team (1942–1943), the London Majors (1944–1959), London Diamonds (1960–1961), the London Majors (1962), London Pontiacs (1963–1969), the London Avcos (1970–1973) and the London El-Morocco Majors (1974), depending on the team sponsorship of the day. Since 1975, the team has stuck with the London Majors moniker.

=== 1948 London Majors ===
In 1948 London Majors, considered one of the best teams in Intercounty history, not only won the Intercounty League championship, but the Canadian Baseball Congress Championship and the Can-Am North American championship of the National Baseball Congress beating the Fort Wayne, Indiana, General Electrics in a best-of-seven-game series played at Labatt Park, with such London stars as pitcher "Tireless" Tommy White, catcher Jack Fairs, short-stop/ fielder Russell (the Muscle) Evon, catcher Gil Robertson, infielder Don Cooper and rookie outfielder Joltin' Joe Bechard.

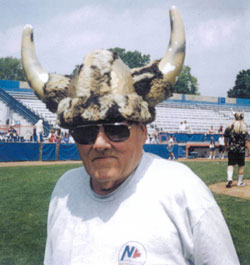
Norm Aldridge at Labatt Park in May 1998 during the fundraising ballgame, The Rumble at the Riverforks. Aldridge, trainer with the 1948 Majors, also has a baseball diamond named after him in northeast London, Ontario -- Norm Aldridge Field.

Fort Wayne had gained renown by losing one game in 15 tournaments played during the previous two years.

The Majors won the opener on September 21, 1948, at Labatt Park when Joe Bechard's single in the 11th inning scored Johnny Lockington from second with the winning run in an 8–7 victory. Three times in the game Bechard had knocked in a run tying the game for London. It was "the greatest display of clutch hitting ever seen in the local ball yard", wrote Free Press sports editor Jack Park.

Fort Wayne went up 3–2 in the best-of-seven series but London pitcher Tommy White threw a five-hitter and Bechard hit a grand slam in a 13-1 London win in Game 6. White returned to the mound the next day and allowed five hits but blanked the Electrics 5-0 to give London the championship and post his third win of the series.

The 1948 London Majors team is considered to be one of the best amateur men's baseball teams of all time and were inducted into the London Sports Hall of Fame at Budweiser Gardens in 2002.

Majors' shortstop Mike Ambrose (left, a third-generation London Major) and first-team-all-star Kyle Piwowarczyk (second baseman) at the historic Roy McKay Clubhouse at Labatt Park on Canada Day 2006.

The Majors have won the league (playoff) championship series 14 times in the years 1925, 1936, 1937 (as the London Silverwoods), 1943 (as the London Army Team), 1944, 1945, 1947, 1948, 1951, 1956, 1969 (as the London Pontiacs), 1975, 2021 and 2022 (as the London Majors). In 1943, 1944 and 1947, the London Majors also won the Ontario Baseball Association Sr. 'A' championships (see team photo below on an external link), the Canadian Baseball Congress Championships in 1943, 1944, 1947 and 1948 and the Can-Am North American Championship in 1948.

According to the IBL record books, the Majors won the pennant race (atop the regular season standings) in 1946, 1947, 1956, 1964, 1965, 1968, 1969, 1970, 1975, 1988, 2008, 2016 and 2021 (13 in total).

Traditionally, one of the high points in the season of the London Majors is a game with the Toronto Maple Leafs on July 1 (Canada Day), which is usually followed by fireworks over the adjacent forks of the Thames River.

In 1950, pitcher Ted Alexander joined the Majors. Previously, Alexander had been a star pitcher for a total of 14 seasons with the Homestead Grays and the Kansas City Monarchs of the Negro National League. Alexander left the Majors part way through the 1951 season, during which the Majors won the Intercounty title with star pitchers, Stan and Bill Slack. The Majors also won the Intercounty title in 1956 with former New York Yankee/ Pittsburgh Pirate outfielder Frank Colman as the owner-manager of the team.

== 1975 London Majors ==
Arden Eddie, who has played at first base, second base and the outfield during his 34-year playing career for the London Majors in the Intercounty League, was a key member of the 1975 Majors when they won the Intercounty title, the last year that the team has won the league championship. In 2007, Arden Eddie was inducted into the London Sports Hall of Fame.

Other players on the 1975 Majors ballclub were: former Major League Baseball, left-handed pitcher Mike Kilkenny, a league all-star and 1975 Intercounty MVP; shortstop Dave Byers; all-star second-and-third baseman Barry Boughner; 1975 batting champion Larry Haggitt (.412); manager Roy McKay; coach John Ambrose; long-time coach-trainer Norm Aldridge (Aldridge has a City-owned baseball diamond named after him in northeast London called Norm Aldridge Field); Larry Wilson; pitcher Phil Schmidt; pitcher Rick Lindquist; Barry Fuller; Mike Fess; catcher Wayne (Dog) Fenlon; Brian Bell; captain Dave (Whitey) Lapthorne; infielder Mike Mitchell; infielder Rob Watral; John Marks; Alex McKay Jr; Jamie Hodge; John Gourley Jr.; pitcher Neal Ambrose; trainers Ed Loney and Bob Gilan; General Manager George Hall and batboy Jim McKay.

Affectionately known as "Killer", Kilkenny was 9–0, with 129 strikeouts, 46 walks, nine complete games and an earned run average of 1.31. Kilkenny previously played for the Detroit Tigers (1969–1972), Oakland Athletics (1972), San Diego Padres (1972), and Cleveland Indians (1972–1973) during a five-season stint (1969–1973) in the Major Leagues. In 1969, Kilkenny was named "Rookie of the Year" for the Detroit Tigers.

The 1975 London Majors were inducted into the London Sports Hall of Fame in 2015.

== Recent team developments ==
In 2004, the London Majors made it to the best-of-seven championship IBL series with the Guelph Royals, but were defeated four games to one. After the 2004 season, the Majors moved out of the Roy McKay Clubhouse, pending interior renovations to the historic structure, and into the dressing room under the third-baseline grandstand, a dressing room previously used by the London Tigers (1989–1993), the London Werewolves (1999–2001) and the London Monarchs (2003).

After buying the London Majors prior to the 2004 season, in October, 2005, team owner Scott Dart brought his friend and former veteran London Majors' outfielder, Roop Chanderdat, in as team co-owner, with Chanderdat also assuming the duties of general manager.

On January 14, 2006, The London Free Press reported that the Majors had become an international organization with 11 scouts in Latin America, the U.S., Mexico, Italy and Japan.

Since the 2006 season, Majors' Co-Owner/ General Manager Roop Chanderdat has also been the team's field manager. In late June 2017, Chanderdat became the London Majors' manager to register the most career wins, overtaking former manager Roy McKay's record of 257 wins.

== Outstanding London Majors in 2006 ==
London Majors named to the Intercounty Baseball League's first-all-star team in 2006 were second-baseman Kyle Piwowarczyk and outfielder Brad McElroy (who also won the league's regular season batting title with a .403 batting average).

The Majors also led the league in batting during the regular season with an overall team average of .305.

Named to the second-all-star team in 2006 were outfielder Kevin Virtue, left-handed pitcher Erick Perez, designated hitter Chuck Roberts and manager Roop Chanderdat.

Rudy Vallejos, an outfielder with the 2006 London Majors, won the Intercounty Baseball League Rookie of the Year (Brian Kerr Memorial Trophy). Vallejos enjoyed a productive first season in the IBL, hitting .304 with two homers and 41 RBI. The Ottawa, Ontario, native also hit five doubles, scored 28 runs and was fourth in the league with 19 stolen bases in 30 games.

== 2006 IBL playoffs ==
The 2006 London Majors fared well in the Intercounty playoffs, dispatching the Kitchener Panthers in four straight games and the defending IBL champions and pennant winners, the Barrie Baycats in five games.

In the final series, however, the Majors were defeated four games to one by the Brantford Red Sox, who won their first Intercounty title since 1981 on August 25, 2006, in Brantford.

=== Denny McLain, Fergie Jenkins and Dave Rozema ===
In 1974, after Denny McLain had retired from the major leagues two years earlier, McLain played a season for the London Majors. Due to arm problems, however, McLain only pitched nine innings for the Majors, but did play in 14 games at either shortstop, first base and catcher and batted .380, including hitting two homers in one game in London.

In 1984–1985 after Fergie Jenkins retired from Major League Baseball in 1983, he pitched for the London Majors, commuting from one of his homes near Chatham, Ontario.

After pitcher Dave Rozema retired from Major League Baseball (Detroit Tigers, 1977–84, and Texas Rangers, 1985–86) on April 30, 1986, he pitched for the London Majors in the early 1990s.

== Roy McKay Clubhouse ==
The 1937, tongue-and-groove clapboard Majors' clubhouse at Labatt Park, officially renamed "The Roy McKay Clubhouse" on August 1, 1996 (Roy McKay was born on August 1, 1933), by longtime Majors' owner-player Arden Eddie, was designated under Part IV of the Ontario Heritage Act in 1996—an initiative spearheaded by The Friends of Labatt Park—by amending the park's original (by-law) reasons for designation. The one-storey, cottage-style building is owned by the City of London and is one of the few remaining clubhouses of its kind remaining in North America still being used for the purpose for which it was built.

On May 31, 1998, a fundraising ballgame ("The Rumble at the Riverforks") between the members of London city council, the media and the London Majors old-timers was held to help defray the costs of a new cedar-shingle roof on the Roy McKay Clubhouse. The game was organized by Arden Eddie, The Friends of Labatt Park, SCENE magazine and the London Majors.

The late Roy McKay (1933–1995) was a longtime London Majors' pitcher, coach and manager who died on Christmas Day, 1995. At age 12, McKay was also the mascot-batboy for the 1945 London Majors — the Intercounty and Ontario champions (see photo of the 1945 London Majors at the external link below).

Tom (Tim) Burgess also played for the 1945 Majors as a pitcher-outfielder and was signed to a pro contract in 1946 by the St. Louis Cardinals' organization. After years in Major League Baseball as either a player or coach, Burgess was inducted into the Canadian Baseball Hall of Fame in 1991.

The London Majors Baseball Club was owned by player-coach Arden Eddie from 1976 until February 2004, when Eddie and his wife Shelley sold the team to London businessperson/ mortgage consultant Scott Dart.

Eddie, who holds three Intercounty League records—most games played (834); most stolen bases (179) and most bases on balls (668) -- first started playing for the London Majors in 1967 (as a junior call-up) after moving to London from his hometown of Wallaceburg, Ontario, where he has been inducted into the Wallaceburg Sports Hall of Fame.

== Roster ==
London Majors Roster
Active Roster	Coaching Staff
Pitchers: 45 (Canada) Caleb Cassie; -- (Puerto Rico) Miguel Cirino; 28 (Canada) Dustin Davidson; 24 (United States) Kade Douglas; 38 (Canada) Skylar Janisse; 26 (Canada) Travis Keys; 97 (Canada) Zachary Laird; 53 (Dominican Republic) Victor Payano; 51 (Dominican Republic) Luis Perez ‡; 23 (Dominican Republic) Cesilio Pimentel; 40 (Canada) Alex Springer; Designated hitters: 35 (United States) Cleveland Brownlee; Utility Players: 6 (Canada) Jaden Babiuk; 37 (Canada) Adam Thuss; Catchers: 26 (Dominican Republic) Eduardo De Oleo; Infielders: 12 (United States) Jarrett Burney; 28 (Canada) David Draayers; 8 (Dominican Republic) Maikol Escotto; -- (Dominican Republic) Cristian Inoa; 63 (Canada) Kyle Maves; 44 (Canada) Xavier Whittle; Outfielders: 20 (Dominican Republic) Roberto Caro; 96 (Canada) Ryder Hancock; 7 (Dominican Republic) Starling Joseph; 33 (Canada) Trent Lenihan; 27 (Canada) Tucker Zdunich	Manager: -- Roop Chanderdat (general manager); Coaches: -- Alberto González (assistant); -- Casey Pulham (assistant); -- Tyler Schmidt (assistant); Roster updated on June 5, 2026: Disabled list; ‡ Inactive list; >§ Suspended list

== Retired numbers ==
The Majors have retired 13 numbered uniforms: those of Jon Owen (1), Norm Aldridge (3), Russ Evon (4), Stan (Gabby) Anderson/ Richard Thompson (5), Wayne Fenlon (9), Bob Deakin (10), Roy McKay (16), Tommy White/ Mike Kilkenny (17), Dave Byers (18), Fergie Jenkins (31) and on July 6, 2008, Arden Eddie's jersey (24) was officially retired.

== Team owners ==
Owners of the team over the years have included Public Utilities Commission director Bill Farquharson, Clare Van Horne, ex-Major League Baseball player Frank Colman (1956–early 1960), jeweller Chester Pegg, sportswriter/ author Bob Ferguson (1963–64), Ted Earley, George Hall, Arden Eddie (1976-February, 2003) and the current co-owners of Scott Dart and Roop Chanderdat.

Frank Colman first played for the Majors in the mid-1930s. In 1936, he was a top Intercounty League pitcher and hitter, winning the league batting title and MVP award, which soon led to a pro contract. In 1941 and 1942, Colman played for the Toronto Maple Leafs of the International League. In 1942, he signed as an outfielder with the Pittsburgh Pirates. He remained with the Pirates as a first baseman-outfielder until late in the 1946 season when he signed with the New York Yankees. In 1949 and 1950, Colman played for Seattle of the Pacific Coast League, before returning to play for the AAA Toronto Maple Leafs in 1951 as player-coach.

In 1954, Colman returned to his hometown of London, Ontario, signing on as player-manager with the London Majors, then owned by team general manager Clare Van Horne. In 1955, Colman purchased the Majors in 1956 from Van Horne and co-founded the Eager Beaver Baseball Association with London sportsman Gordon Berryhill and Al Marshall. Colman's Majors won the Intercounty title in 1956.

== 2019 milestones ==
In 2019, Roop Chanderdat the Majors field and general manager reached 300 wins on July 7, with a 6-1 win over the Hamilton Cardinals at home. He finished the season at 305 victories.

On Canada Day of that same season, Cleveland Brownlee, who had played in the league since 2009 reached the 100 homerun plateau. The Majors won that game 15-3 over the defending champion Barrie Baycats.

== Championships ==
Intercounty Baseball League (IBL)

- 1925 (London Braves)
- 1936 (London Winery)
- 1937 (London Silverwoods)
- 1943 (London Army Team)
- 1944 (London Majors)
- 1945 (London Majors)
- 1947 (London Majors)
- 1948 (London Majors)
- 1951 (London Majors)
- 1956 (London Majors)
- 1969 (London Pontiacs)
- 1975 (London Majors)
- 2021 (London Majors)
- 2022 (London Majors)

IBL Pennants

- 1946 (London Majors)
- 1947 (London Majors)
- 1956 (London Majors)
- 1964 (London Pontiacs)
- 1965 (London Pontiacs)
- 1968 (London Pontiacs)
- 1969 (London Pontiacs)
- 1970 (London Avcos)
- 1975 (London Majors)
- 1988 (London Majors)
- 2008 (London Majors)
- 2016 (London Majors)
- 2021 (London Majors)
- 2022 (London Majors)

Senior A Ontario Baseball Association

- 1943
- 1945
- 1947

Great Lakes Baseball League

- 1957

Canadian Baseball Congress

- 1943
- 1944
- 1947
- 1948

Can-Am Baseball Congress

- 1948
