= Slippery Rock Sliders =

- Logo

Information
- League: Prospect League (East Division)
- Location: Slippery Rock, Pennsylvania
- Ballpark: Jack Critchfield Park
- Founded: 2007 (Frontier League), 2009 (Prospect League)
- Former name: Slippery Rock Sliders (2007, 2009-2013)
- Former league: Frontier League (2007)
- Colors: Forest green, black, gray, white, red
- Ownership: Slippery Rock Sports Group, LLC
- Management: Mike Bencic (GM)
- Manager: Brad Neffendorf
- Media: Aaron Anderson (Web Broadcaster)

The Slippery Rock Sliders were a professional, and later collegiate summer baseball team based in Slippery Rock, Pennsylvania, in the United States. They were a member of the Frontier League and the East Division of the summer collegiate Prospect League.

== History ==
=== Frontier League ===
The Sliders were formed for the 2007 season to ensure an even number of teams with the Frontier League's addition of the Southern Illinois Miners. The Sliders played a mere 32 home games at Jack Critchfield Park in Slippery Rock, Pennsylvania, with the remaining 64 played on the road. For the 2008 season, the Sliders became a traveling team, playing all of their games on the road under the geographical moniker, Midwest Sliders.

The Frontier League Sliders' became the Midwest Sliders of Ypsilanti for the 2009 season. That year they played at Eastern Michigan University's Oestrike Stadium located in Ypsilanti, Michigan. In 2010, the team was renamed the Oakland County Cruisers, and moved into the new Diamond at the Summit ballpark. In 2012, the team moved again to London, Ontario and became the London Rippers. The team folded halfway through the season, and once again became a traveling team known as the Road Warriors. The Road Warriors would be the final incarnation of the franchise as the team did not return to any city in the 2013 season.

=== Prospect League ===
When the summer-collegiate Prospect League was formed, Slippery Rock was announced as one of the franchise locations. Owner/GM Mike Bencic acquired the Sliders name & logo rights, bringing the ball team back in 2009.

In the 2009 season the Sliders were managed by Chase Rowe, a Slippery Rock University alumnus and current head coach of nearby La Roche College.

Over the next five years the Sliders would form a small rivalry with fellow Butler County PL team the Butler BlueSox. The Sliders ceased operations in Slippery Rock at the end of the 2013 season. The franchise relocated to Springfield, Ohio and were renamed the Champion City Kings.

== Seasons ==
Slippery Rock Sliders (Frontier League)
Year	W-L	PCT	Place	Postseason
2007	29-66	.305	4th in FL East	
2008	Did not play			
Total	29-66	.305		
Slippery Rock Sliders (Prospect League)
Year	W-L	PCT	Place	Postseason
2009	22-31	.415	5th in PL East	
2010	21-33	.389	4th in PL East	
2011	26-29	.472	3rd in PL East	2-1 L WV Miners
2012	20-40	.333	5th in PL East	
2013				
Total	89-133	.401		
