= Arden Eddie =

Canadian baseball player, team owner and manager

Arden Eddie (born August 4, 1947) is a Canadian former baseball player, team owner and manager who played in the Intercounty Baseball League. He holds several Intercounty records, including most games played (834), most bases on balls (668) and most stolen bases (170). In 2007, Eddie was inducted into the London Sports Hall of Fame.

Off the field, Eddie is a realtor and home renovator. He spent 37 years involved with the Intercounty League (33 years as a player for the London Majors: 1967–1999; 27 years as owner of the Majors: 1977-February 2004), before he sold the team to 36-year-old London mortgage consultant Scott Dart after the 2003 baseball season.

Eddie was born in Wallaceburg, Ontario, Canada (where he has been inducted into the Wallaceburg Sports Hall of Fame), but moved to London, Ontario, Canada, in 1967 at age 18. A knee injury playing as a sea cadet in Nova Scotia reduced his pro prospects, but didn't diminish his enthusiasm for the game of baseball.

== Baseball in London ==
In 1967, Eddie started playing for the London Diamonds' junior Intercounty team managed by Bill Phillips and for the London Pontiacs of the Senior Intercounty Baseball League at historic Labatt Park, where he played outfield, second base and first base wearing jersey #24.

Eddie was a player on the 1968 Canadian junior champions, the London Diamonds, while also playing games for the London Pontiacs.

The Majors won the Senior Intercounty pennant and title in 1975, the last time the London Majors have done so (although when Eddie was a player, the London Pontiacs won the Intercounty league pennant in 1968, the pennant and championship in 1969 and the league pennant in 1970 as the London Avcos and the league pennant again in 1988 as the London Majors).

In 1977, Eddie bought the London Majors from George Hall.

== Tradition ==
In the spring of 1977, Eddie moved the London Majors back into the old team, circa 1937 clubhouse, saving the one-story, cottage-style structure from near-certain demolition. For the previous decade the clubhouse was being used by the city's Parks and Recreation Department as a storage facility.

The clubhouse was officially named the Roy McKay Clubhouse on August 1, 1996, in honour of Eddie's mentor Roy McKay, a former Majors batboy, pitcher, manager, and coach.

Eddie was supportive of the heritage designation of Labatt Park under the Ontario Heritage Act in 1994 as the world's oldest baseball grounds in continuous use in its original location. The park's designating by-law was subsequently amended in 1996 to protect and preserve the Majors' clubhouse. As a result, both the park and the Roy McKay Clubhouse are designated City of London-owned heritage properties under the Act.

During Eddie's ownership of the London Majors, the team contributed many thousands of pounds of food to the London and Area Food Bank and enabled scores of local charities and non-profits to raise more than $115,000 through Majors' ticket sales.

Additionally, many baseball pundits credit Eddie with keeping the Majors' franchise alive in London despite competition from three professional teams between 1989 and 2003: the Eastern League's London Tigers, the Frontier League's London Werewolves and the Canadian Baseball League's London Monarchs.

Today, Arden Eddie and his family reside near Goderich, Ontario and remain honorary members of the Friends of Labatt Park for their contributions to local area baseball and its heritage, and the Intercounty Baseball League.

On May 14, 2007, the London Sports Council announced Arden Eddie as one of the four inductees into the London Sports Hall of Fame for 2007. On Sunday, July 6, 2008, the jersey of Arden Eddie (#24) was officially retired by the London Majors.
