= Oakland County Cruisers =

Professional baseball team based in Waterford Township, Michigan

- Logo

Information
- League: Frontier League (East)
- Location: Waterford Township, Michigan
- Ballpark: Oestrike Stadium
- Founded: 2007
- Disbanded: 2012
- League championships: 0
- Division championships: 0
- Former name: Oakland County Cruisers (2010); Midwest Sliders of Ypsilanti (2009); Midwest Sliders (2008); Slippery Rock Sliders (2007)
- Former ballpark: Jack Critchfield Park
- Colors: Navy, Kelly green, white, gray, black
- Ownership: Diamond Heroes of Southeastern Michigan (President & CEO Rob Hilliard)
- General manager: Eric Coleman
- Manager: Gera Alvarez
- Media: The Oakland Press

The Oakland County Cruisers were a professional baseball team based in Waterford Township, Michigan, in the United States. They were a member of the East Division of the Frontier League, which is not affiliated with Major League Baseball. The team became the London Rippers in 2012.

The name "Cruisers" is a reference to Oakland County's location in Metropolitan Detroit, home of the three major American automobile companies: Ford, Chrysler, and General Motors. All three companies have significant investments in Oakland County. Each August, the county hosts the Woodward Dream Cruise.

== History ==
The Slippery Rock Sliders were formed for the 2007 season to ensure an even number of teams with the Frontier League's addition of the Southern Illinois Miners. The Sliders played 32 home games at Jack Critchfield Park in Slippery Rock, Pennsylvania, with the remaining 64 played on the road. For the 2008 season, the Sliders became a traveling team, playing all of their games on the road under the geographical moniker, Midwest.

The Sliders' 2009 season began on May 29, at Eastern Michigan University's Oestrike Stadium located in Ypsilanti, Michigan. The Sliders played strong - a 33–33 record after 66 games. However, countless injuries and the sale of top starting pitching led to a late-season slump. Pitcher James Albury was sold to the Chicago White Sox and pitcher Caleb Graham was sold to the Los Angeles Angels of Anaheim. The Sliders had 42 scheduled home dates with 54 scheduled road dates.

The Oakland County Cruisers were scheduled move into Diamond at The Summit on July 16, 2010, after playing three three-game series (nine games total) at Oestrike Stadium during the first half of the 2010 Frontier League season, however, the organization was unable to obtain funding in time for this to occur. The Cruisers played 78 of its 96 regular-season games on the road. The Cruisers led the Frontier League East for better than two months. However, the high number of road games (30 more than any other team) and the solid play of the Windy City Thunderbolts and Traverse City Beach Bums down the stretch led to a third-place finish - only four games out. Interim Manager Gera Alvarez won 2010 Frontier League Manager of the Year. Pitcher P.J. Zocchi and first baseman Joash Brodin were named to the Frontier League End-of-Year All-Star Team. Zocchi tied the Frontier League record for saves in a season with 26 (matched Matt Petty of the Windy City Thunderbolts in 2007) and was named Frontier League Relief Pitcher of the Year.

Construction on Diamond at The Summit was supposed to begin in October 2010 with the stadium completed in June 2011. The complex would hold approximately 4,000 fans and function as a year-sound sports and entertainment complex in Waterford Township. After a groundbreaking ceremony with officials of Waterford Township, the area still sits as a vacant parking lot to the adjoining and vacant Summit Place Mall. A small sign touting the construction project sits on the corner of two shopping mall "streets" with fading color in a sea of weeds.

== Baseball in Ypsilanti ==
The Sliders were Ypsilanti's first pro baseball team in nearly a century, since they were awarded a franchise in the Class D Border League in 1913. The Border League was sometimes called a "trolley league" because its six franchises (in southeastern Michigan and Ontario, Canada) were located on the interurban lines; they played a limited schedule of games, primarily on weekends. Managed by former major-leaguer Ducky Pearce, the unnamed Ypsilanti team took the pennant with a 24–10 record, then folded with the rest of the league. Ypsilanti thus held the distinction of being one of the few cities to win a championship in its only season hosting a pro ballclub.

College baseball remains popular in Ypsilanti: Eastern Michigan University won a NAIA national championship in 1970 and made it all the way to the championship game of the NCAA College World Series in 1976 before losing to Arizona. The Hurons (now Eagles) were the last northern school to play for the CWS title until 2019, when cross-county rivals University of Michigan made it to the finals before losing to Vanderbilt.

== Seasons ==
Slippery Rock/Midwest Sliders-of Ypsilanti (Frontier League)
Year	W-L	PCT	Place	Postseason
2007	29-66	.305	4th in FL East	
2008	29-67	.302	6th in FL East	
2009	42-54	.438	6th in FL East	
Oakland County Cruisers (Frontier League)
Year	W-L	PCT	Place	Postseason
2010	53-43	.552	3rd in FL East	No, three games out
Total	153-230	.399		
