= Roy McKay =

Roy McKay may refer to:

- Roy McKay (baseball)
- Roy McKay (American football)
- Roy McKay (footballer)
