= Norm Aldridge Field =

Baseball park in London, Ontario

Coordinates: 43.0176°N 81.2048°W

Norm Aldridge Field is a municipally owned, natural-grass baseball diamond in Stronach Park in northeast London, Ontario, that was built as a secondary baseball venue for the 2001 Canada Summer Games and named by London city council after longtime London sportsman/ athlete, Norman James Aldridge (Jan. 25, 1925 - July 15, 2015), on September 5, 2000.

The baseball diamond has the same dimensions as Labatt Park in London, namely: 330 feet down the left- and right-field lines and 402 feet to the centre-field fence.

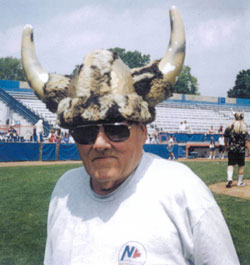
Norm Aldridge at Labatt Park on May 31, 1998, during the fundraising ballgame, The Rumble at the Riverforks.

Aldridge was the City of London's oldest (part-time) employee. He worked at Stronach Park and Stronach Arena in London, after he retired from General Steel Wares. Mr. Aldridge, the trainer-coach with the legendary 1948 London Majors (International Champions), the 1951-1952 Lou Ball Juniors (Ontario Champions), the 1970 London TV Cable Fastball Team (Canadian Champions) and the 1975 London Majors (Intercounty Baseball League Champions) has been inducted into the London Sports Hall of Fame as a member of all four inducted teams.
