= Bob Ferguson (journalist) =

Canadian sports journalist and writer (1931–2014)

- Born: July 1, 1931; Windsor, Ontario, Canada
- Died: November 23, 2014 (aged 83); Kanata, Ontario, Canada
- Occupations: Sports journalist and writer
- Known for: The London Free Press, Ottawa Citizen
- Notable work: Who's Who in Canadian Sport
- Awards: Ottawa Sport Hall of Fame (2009)

Robert Ferguson (July 1, 1931 – November 23, 2014) was a Canadian sports journalist and writer. He began in journalism with The London Free Press from 1952 to 1964, and was colour commentator for baseball games broadcast on CFPL (AM). He also served as the official statistician of the Intercounty Baseball League from 1958 to 1966, and owned the London Pontiacs in the same league during the 1963 and 1964 seasons. He later worked for the Ottawa Citizen from 1967 to 1996, and was the paper's first writer assigned to cover the Montreal Expos. He believed in giving angry athletes a second chance at a better quote to avoid making the player look bad, and was a board member for Canada's Sports Hall of Fame. He wrote Who's Who in Canadian Sport, a book of biographies for Canadian sports persons; first published in 1977, with subsequent volumes in 1985, 1999 and 2005. His career was recognized with induction into the Ottawa Sport Hall of Fame in 2009, as a builder in the media category.

== Early life ==
Robert Ferguson was born on July 1, 1931, in Windsor, Ontario. His mother worked as a singer, and he sang with an orchestra during the late-1940s. While performing a Doris Day song in Darien, Connecticut, actress Mary Martin invited him to audition for a role in South Pacific. He declined the opportunity to sing in Broadway theatre, completed his high school education by 1950, then worked for C$35 per week as a teller at The Dominion Bank in downtown London, Ontario. In an interview in 1996, Ferguson stated that the highlight of his banking career was "[shovelling] the street corner after a major snowstorm".

== Early career in London ==
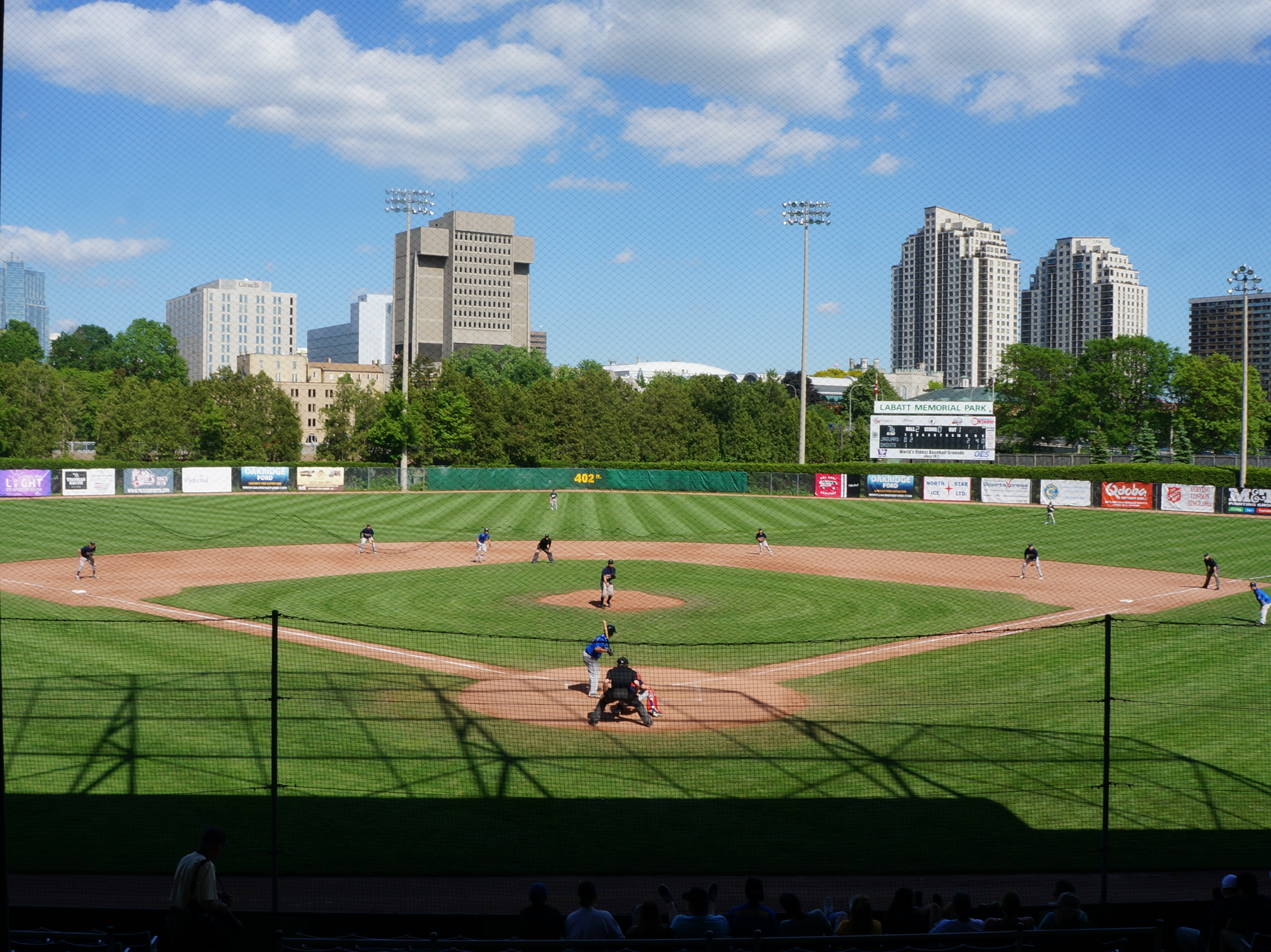
Labatt Park was the home field for the London Pontiacs.

Ferguson applied to write radio commercials for CFPL (AM) in London in 1952, and was instead hired on a temporary basis as a sports journalist by its parent company, The London Free Press. He considered himself to be an average athlete, who had an interest in writing before becoming a journalist. In addition to reporting, he served as a colour commentator for baseball games broadcast on CFPL. He was recruited by former Major League Baseball player Frank Colman in 1955, to assist with founding a youth baseball league in London, which became the Eager Beaver Baseball Association. Ferguson recalled that when proposing names for the association, "I said, why not call them, Eager Beavers? They're all eager beavers! And it stuck!"

The Intercounty Baseball League (IBL) named Ferguson its official statistician each season from 1958 to 1966. He recalled becoming the owner of the London Majors in the IBL "by accident" in 1963, after he paid the $50 entry fee on behalf of the Majors, despite that the owner chose not to field a team for the season without telling anyone or attending the meeting. Ferguson agreed to share the wealth with the players while operating the team, then obtained a sponsorship from London Motor Products and the team was renamed to be the London Pontiacs. The Pontiacs won the IBL regular season pennant in 1964, then Ferguson sold the team to London Motor Products after the season.

Ferguson departed The London Free Press to serve as the general manager of the Ivanhoe Curling Club in London from 1964 to 1966, then the Strathroy Golf and Country Club in 1966.

== Later career in Ottawa ==
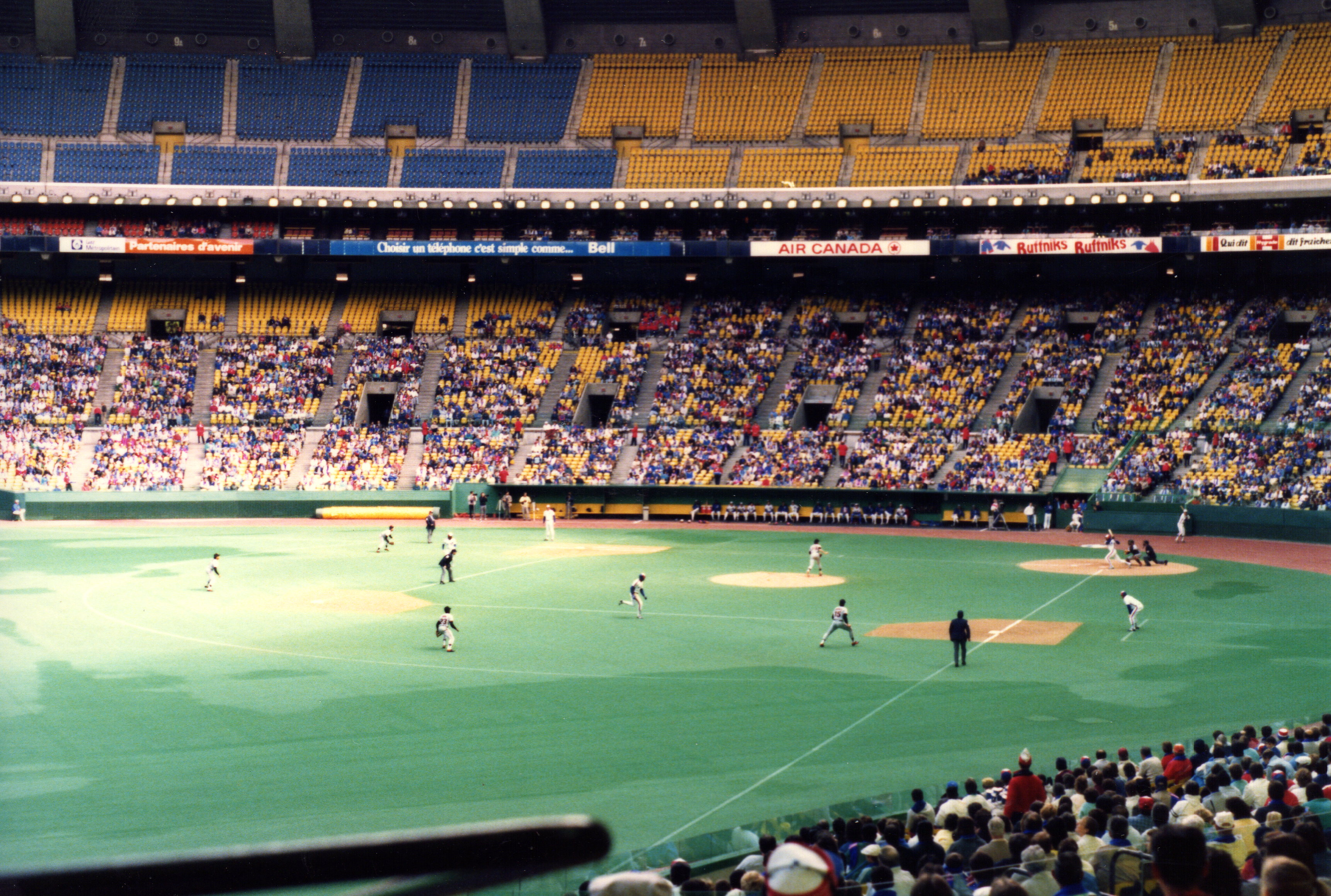
Montreal Expos playing at Olympic Stadium

Ferguson began his career with the Ottawa Citizen on January 3, 1967, and was the paper's first writer assigned to cover the Montreal Expos. He travelled with the Expos for five seasons, and reported on the 1976 Summer Olympics in Montreal, and was a regular contributor to The Canadian Encyclopedia, the Sporting News, The Hockey News, and the Curling Canada News. His columns also covered football and basketball for the Ottawa Gee-Gees and the Carleton Ravens; golf, curling, and high school sports. He was also a board member for several halls of fame, including Canada's Sports Hall of Fame.

He retired from full-time work with the Ottawa Citizen on June 8, 1996. He stated in 2009, that his favourite sport to cover was baseball; and that, "I've probably covered every sport played by the best and the worst, and sometimes the ones played by the worst were the best. They were genuine. It was mostly the kids, and you knew they were giving it everything they had. It was a lot of fun and it was a good life". His favourite stories covered were a no-hitter pitched by Bob Feller, and the 1985 Labatt Brier come-from-behind victory by Al Hackner. Ferguson described his most surprising interviews as Ted Williams and Steve Carlton. Ferguson believed in giving angry athletes a second chance at a better quote, to avoid making the player look bad and getting future interviews.

== Who's Who In Canadian Sport ==
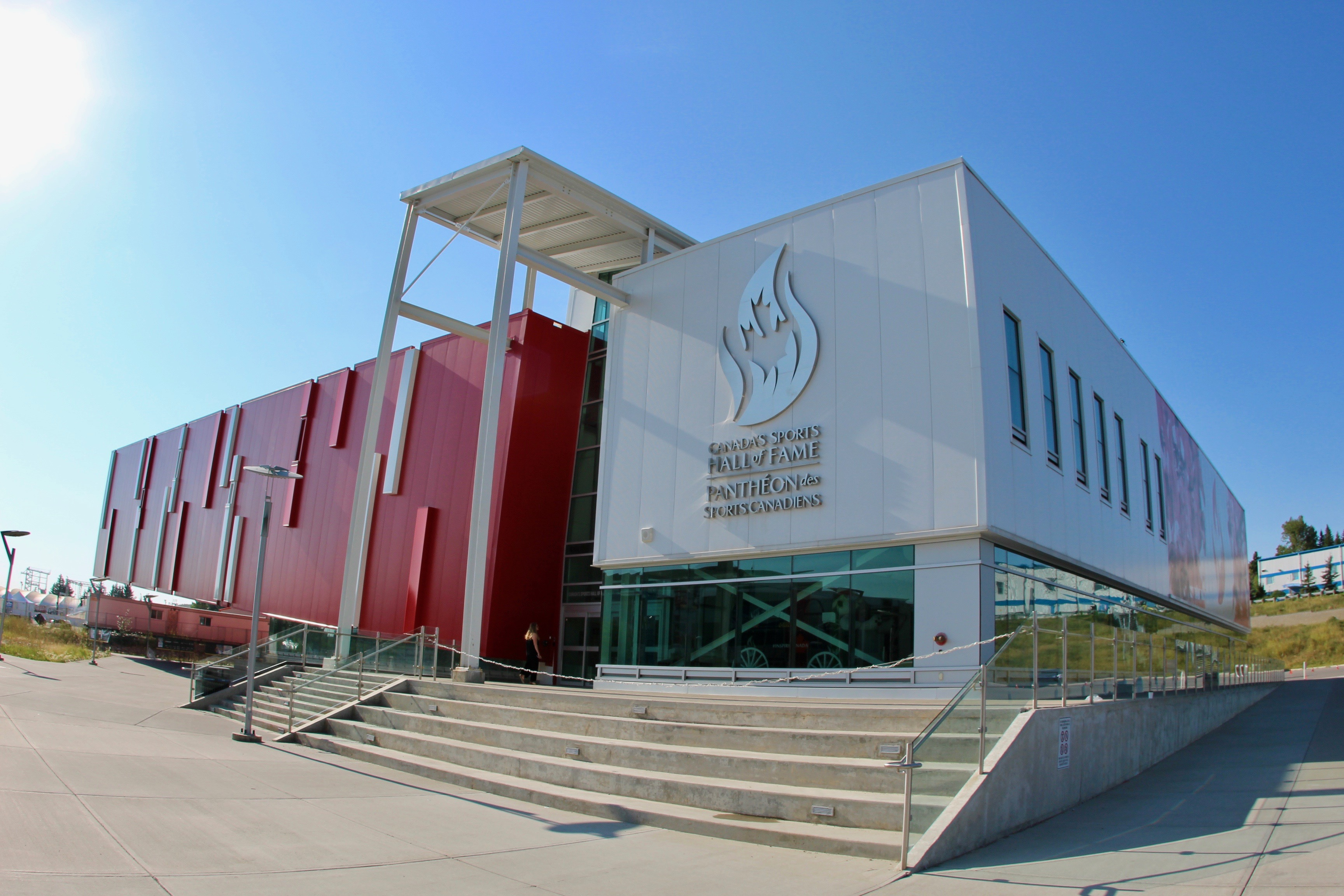
Canada's Sports Hall of Fame

Ferguson wrote Who's Who in Canadian Sport, a book of biographies for Canadian sports persons; including lists of national champions by sport, Canadian Olympic teams dating from 1904, and inductees of various Canadian sports halls of fame. The book was first published in 1977, with subsequent volumes published in 1985, 1999 and 2005. By the release of the final volume of Who's Who in Canadian Sport in 2005, Ferguson had included research on almost 5,000 Canadian sports persons.

Sports journalist Bob Elliott described the book as "a resource must for libraries, newsrooms and anyone else wanting a reference guide to check on the best of the best of this country's athletes"; and stated that Ferguson was "a blood hound when it came to a news story and the same with doing research"; and that "Ferguson was Wikipedia before Google was a gleam in of [sic] the eyes of worldwide web founders Tim Berners-Lee, Marc Andreessen and Brian Behlendorf".

== Later life and honours ==
In 1996, Ferguson was made a Fellow by the Ottawa High School Athletic Association and the Carleton High School Athletic Association. He was the inaugural recipient of the Ernie Calcutt/Eddie MacCabe/Brian Smith Memorial Lifetime Achievement Award, from the Ottawa Sport Award Society in 2005. He was inducted into the Ottawa Sport Hall of Fame in 2009, as a builder in the media category. In response to the induction, Ferguson stated, "I'm quite honoured. I personally think there were people who could have been selected ahead of me, but I appreciate the honour".

Ferguson died on November 23, 2014, in Kanata, Ontario. In 2015, Bob Elliott included Ferguson in his list of the 101 most influential Canadians in baseball, as one of eight people selected in the #101 position.
