= Tom Burgess (baseball) =

Canadian baseball player (1927–2008)

- First baseman / Coach
- Born: September 1, 1927; London, Ontario, Canada
- Died: November 24, 2008 (aged 81); Lambeth, London, Ontario, Canada
- Batted: Left Threw: Left

MLB debut
- April 17, 1954, for the St. Louis Cardinals

Last MLB appearance
- September 29, 1962, for the Los Angeles Angels

MLB statistics
- Batting average: .177
- Home runs: 2
- Runs batted in: 14
- Stats at Baseball Reference

Teams
- As player: St. Louis Cardinals (1954); Los Angeles Angels (1962); As coach: New York Mets (1977); Atlanta Braves (1978)

Member of the Canadian

Baseball Hall of Fame
- Induction: 1992

Thomas Roland Burgess (September 1, 1927 – November 24, 2008) was a Canadian professional baseball player, coach and manager. An outfielder and first baseman, Burgess had two trials in Major League Baseball (MLB); a 17-game stint with the St. Louis Cardinals in 1954, and a full season with the Los Angeles Angels in 1962. He then forged a long career as a minor-league manager, and served as a major-league third base coach for the 1977 New York Mets and 1978 Atlanta Braves.

In his playing days, he threw and batted left-handed and stood 6 feet 0 inches (1.83 m) tall and weighed 180 pounds (82 kg).

== Biography ==
A native of London, Ontario, Burgess attended the University of Western Ontario. He first signed with the Cardinals in 1946, making his debut with the Hamilton Red Wings of the Class D Pennsylvania–Ontario–New York League (PONY League). Despite compiling a robust .350 batting average in 1947 in the Class C Interstate League, by 1949 Burgess was voluntarily retired and spent three seasons with the London Majors of the Canadian Intercounty Baseball League. He resumed his pro playing career in 1952 in the Class A South Atlantic League and batted .328, then continued his hot hitting in 1953, batting .346 with 22 home runs and 93 runs batted in with the Cards' top farm team, the Rochester Red Wings of the Triple-A International League. That earned him a promotion to St. Louis for the start of the 1954 campaign, but Burgess collected only one hit—a double off Paul LaPalme of the Pittsburgh Pirates on June 13—in 21 at bats, an .048 batting average, before being sent back to Rochester.

Burgess spent the next seven seasons in the International League, with Rochester and the Columbus Jets, and then was acquired by the expansion Angels in their maiden season of 1961. He spent that year with the Triple-A Dallas-Fort Worth Rangers of the American Association, then made the 25-man roster of the 1962 Angels. He appeared in 87 games and batted 143 times over the course of a full season, but could muster only a .196 batting average. By 1963, he was back in the International League for his final pro season. All told, Burgess batted .177 with 29 hits, two home runs and 14 RBI in 104 major-league games.

He returned to the game as a manager in the farm systems of the Cardinals, Braves, Mets, Texas Rangers and Detroit Tigers in the 1970s and 1980s. He managed in Triple-A with the Tidewater Tides, Richmond Braves, Oklahoma City 89ers and Charleston Charlies, and among his achievements won championships in the Appalachian League, Texas League and the California League. During his 1977 campaign with the Mets, he was the third base coach on the staff of Joe Frazier and Joe Torre and, the following year, served under Bobby Cox in Atlanta. He was named to the Rochester Red Wings Hall of Fame in 1992, the Canadian Baseball Hall of Fame in 1992, and the London (Ontario) Sports Hall of Fame in 2003.

Burgess died from complications due to cancer on November 24, 2008, in Lambeth, London, Ontario.

== Sources ==
- Marcin, Joe, and Byers, Dick, eds., The Baseball Register, 1977 edition. St. Louis: The Sporting News.

Sporting positions
Preceded by Eddie Yost	New York Mets third-base coach 1977	Succeeded by Dal Maxvill
Preceded by Vern Benson	Atlanta Braves third-base coach 1978	Succeeded by Alex Grammas
