= Mike Kilkenny =

Canadian baseball player (1945–2018)

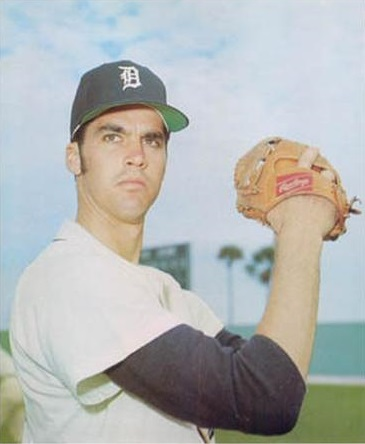
- Pitcher
- Born: April 11, 1945; Bradford, Ontario, Canada
- Died: June 28, 2018 (aged 73); London, Ontario, Canada
- Batted: Right Threw: Left

MLB debut
- April 11, 1969, for the Detroit Tigers

Last MLB appearance
- May 6, 1973, for the Cleveland Indians

MLB statistics
- Win–loss record: 23–18
- Earned run average: 4.43
- Strikeouts: 301
- Stats at Baseball Reference

Teams
- Detroit Tigers (1969–1972); Oakland Athletics (1972); San Diego Padres (1972); Cleveland Indians (1972–1973)

Michael David Kilkenny (April 11, 1945 – June 28, 2018) was a Canadian professional baseball pitcher who appeared in 139 games for four Major League Baseball teams between 1969 and 1973.

Born in Bradford, Ontario, the 6 ft 3 in (1.91 m), 175 lb (79 kg) (12.5 stone) left-hander was signed by the Detroit Tigers as an amateur free agent before the 1964 season. He played for the Tigers (1969–1972), Oakland Athletics (1972), San Diego Padres (1972), and Cleveland Indians (1972–1973). Kilkenny is perhaps best known for giving up Frank Robinson's 499th home run on September 13, 1971, and also for being one of the few players in MLB history to play for four teams in the same season.

The majority of his 139 appearances were as a relief pitcher; he also started 54 games. During his career, Kilkenny gave up 224 walks in just 410 innings, for a BB/9IP of 4.92, much higher than the American League average at that time. With 301 strikeouts, his K/9IP was 6.61, which was higher than the American League average. He finished his career with a total of 23 wins, 18 losses, 4 saves, 32 games finished, and an ERA of 4.43.

On August 12, 1969, Kilkenny pitched a three-hit shutout against the California Angels for his first major league victory. Earlier the same day, Kilkenny's wife, Carol, gave birth to the couple's first child, Rory Erin Kilkenny.

In 1969, Kilkenny was named Tigers Rookie of the Year.

Kilkenny was traded with cash from the Tigers to the Athletics for Reggie Sanders on May 9, 1972.

After his professional career ended, Kilkenny played for the London Majors of the Canadian Intercounty Baseball League where he helped the Majors win the Intercounty title in 1975. He was voted MVP during the regular season, winning the John Bell Memorial trophy with a 9–0 record and 129 strikeouts.
