= Frank Colman =

Canadian baseball player (1918–1983)

- Outfielder
- Born: March 2, 1918; London, Ontario, Canada
- Died: February 19, 1983 (aged 64); London, Ontario, Canada
- Batted: Left Threw: Left

MLB debut
- September 12, 1942, for the Pittsburgh Pirates

Last MLB appearance
- August 3, 1947, for the New York Yankees

MLB statistics
- Batting average: .228
- Home runs: 15
- Runs batted in: 106
- Stats at Baseball Reference

Teams
- Pittsburgh Pirates (1942–1946); New York Yankees (1946–1947)

Member of the Canadian

Baseball Hall of Fame
- Induction: 1999

Frank Lloyd Colman (March 2, 1918 – February 19, 1983) was a Canadian professional baseball outfielder who played in Major League Baseball (MLB) for the Pittsburgh Pirates and New York Yankees during the 1940s. He batted and threw left-handed, was 6 feet 0 inches (1.83 m) tall and weighed 188 pounds (85 kg).

== Early years ==
The son of Frederick and Harriet Colman, who operated a shoe store on Hamilton Road in London, Ontario, Colman joined the London Majors of the senior Intercounty Baseball League in the mid-1930s. There, he won the batting title as a pitcher, Most Valuable Player award, and a championship in 1936.

== Major League Baseball ==
Colman played in MLB with the Pittsburgh Pirates as a first-baseman-outfielder from 1942 to 1946, and the New York Yankees as an outfielder in 1946 and 1947, where he roomed with young Yankee catcher Yogi Berra. Colman and Berra had been teammates with the minor-league Newark Bears in 1946, and both were called up to the Yankees.

In addition to Berra, Colman's teammates on the 1947 Yankees included Joe DiMaggio, Phil Rizzuto, Allie Reynolds, Johnny Lindell, Charlie Keller, Tommy Henrich, Ralph Houk and Joe Page. Colman opened the season as the starting right fielder with the Yankees, but suffered a leg injury and underwent season-ending surgery. The Yankees went on to defeat the Brooklyn Dodgers in seven games for the 1947 World Series.

1947 was Colman's last season in the major leagues, although he did play two more seasons, 1949 and 1950, in the Pacific Coast League with Seattle, where he batted .319 with 18 home runs and 98 RBIs in 1949, and batted .310 in 1950. Colman finished his six-year major league career with 571 at-bats, 15 home runs and 106 RBIs in 271 games for a career average of .228.

== Post-playing career ==
Colman returned to his hometown of London, Ontario, in 1954 after serving as a player-coach with the Toronto Maple Leafs of the Triple-A International League from 1951 through 1953, a team owned by Canadian sporting legend Jack Kent Cooke.

Colman signed on as player-manager for London Majors' owner and general manager Clare Van Horne in 1954. That same year, Alex Park of Alex Park Sporting Goods Ltd. at 300 Dundas Street, hired Colman as an in-store salesman. The sporting goods store was the meeting place for a number of Londoners interested in forming a baseball league for youths.

The following year in 1955, Colman took over the Intercounty League's London Majors at Labatt Park, where it all began for Colman 20 years earlier. Colman's brother Jack (who died in 1962), helped coach the 1955 London Majors. "The sale of the Majors baseball club to Colman is one of the best things to happen to baseball in many years," wrote London Free Press sports editor Jack Park in his "Sport Sparks" column at the time.

As player-owner Colman's London Majors won the Intercounty title in 1956. The team also won the Great Lakes championship in 1957. Colman returned the Majors to the Intercounty loop in 1958, organizing an exhibition ballgame in June 1958 in conjunction with the Knights of Columbus and the Mocha Temple Shrine in aid of the Shrine Hospitals for Crippled Children. The ballgame between the minor-league Toronto Maple Leafs and an all-star team put together by Colman attracted 5,000 fans to Labatt Park. In 1959, Colman sold the London Majors.

In 1955, Colman co-founded the Eager Beaver Baseball Association (EBBA) with sportsman Gordon Berryhill and that organization renamed its all-star day -- "Frank Colman Day"—in 1984. The EBBA is still going strong 52 years later, having mentored thousands of young ballplayers.

Before Colman died of cancer in 1983 at the age of 64, he had been working at the University of Western Ontario in the maintenance department. He was cremated, and his ashes were inurned in London at Woodland Cemetery.

In 1999, Colman was inducted into the Canadian Baseball Hall of Fame. In a letter to the Canadian Baseball Hall of Fame in 1999, Yogi Berra wrote that he visited Colman at his home in Canada on several occasions. "I've made a lot of friends in baseball through the years, but I'll always remember Frank as one of the most decent and genuine people that I ever met," Berra wrote. "I was proud that he was my friend." His son, Frank Colman Jr., accepted the Hall of Fame plaque at the ceremony in St. Marys, Ontario, with a large contingent of Colmans on hand. "If he were here, I think he would say his greatest accomplishment has been his contribution to the community through the work with the Eager Beaver Baseball Association," his son said. "That was his real pride and joy. He really loved that kind of work."

In 2005, Colman was also inducted into the London Sports Hall of Fame at the John Labatt Centre.

== Sources ==
- The Northern Game: Baseball the Canadian Way by Bob Elliott (Sport Classic, 2005).
- Heritage Baseball: City of London's souvenir program from July 23, 2005, celebrating the history of Labatt Park and London, Ontario's 150th anniversary as an incorporated city.
- The magic continues at London's Field of Dreams by Barry Wells (SCENE magazine, London, Ontario, June 15, 2000).
- Who's Who in Canadian Sport by Bob Ferguson (Sporting Facts Publications, Ottawa, 3rd edition, 1999), ISBN 1-894282-00-0.
- Diamonds of the North: A Concise History of Baseball in Canada by William Humber (Oxford University Press, 1995), ISBN 0-19-541039-4.
- EBBA: 40 Years of Baseball by Jeffrey Reed (Eager Beaver Baseball Association, Inc., London, Ontario, 1994, ISBN 0-9698289-0-X).
- Diamond Rituals: Baseball in Canadian Culture by Robert K. Barney (Meckler Books, 1989).
- Sport Sparks by Jack Park, The London Free Press, June 12, 1968.
