= Jack Critchfield Park =

Stadium in Slippery Rock, Pennsylvania

Coordinates: 41.0609°N 80.0385°W

- Interactive map of Jack Critchfield Park
- Location: Slippery Rock, Pennsylvania
- Owner: Slippery Rock University
- Operator: Slippery Rock University
- Capacity: 1,500
- Surface: AstroTurf

Construction
- Opened: 2002

Tenants
- Slippery Rock University baseball team Slippery Rock Sliders (FL/PL) (2007, 2009-2013)

Jack Critchfield Park is a stadium in Slippery Rock, Pennsylvania. It is primarily used for baseball and hosts the Slippery Rock University of Pennsylvania college baseball team. The ballpark has a capacity of 1,500 people and opened in 2002.

== History and notable features ==
The ballpark was home of the Prospect League's Slippery Rock Sliders (2009–2013). It was also the home of the Slippery Rock Sliders of the Frontier League in 2007. The Frontier Sliders played a partial home schedule in 2007, then left Slippery Rock to become a full-time road team in 2008. The Prospect Sliders played at the Park from 2009 until 2013, when they became the Champion City Kings of Springfield, Ohio.

When the Frontier Sliders began their season in 2007, Jack Critchfield Park became the first baseball stadium to be utilized for minor league baseball in Butler County in over fifty years. The last minor league game was played at nearby Pullman Park in the city of Butler in 1951. Between 2009 and 2018, Pullman Park hosted its own Prospect League team, the Butler BlueSox. The BlueSox and Sliders formed a small rivalry during their tenure due to the teams being only several miles from each other.

In 2020 Jack Critchfield park underwent a major renovation in the spring of 2020 with the addition of an artificial playing surface
