= London Monarchs (baseball) =

Defunct baseball team in Canada

Logo
Cap insignia

Information
- League: Canadian Baseball League (East)
- Location: London, Ontario, Canada
- Ballpark: Labatt Park
- Founded: 2003
- Folded: 2003
- League championships: 0
- Division championships: 0
- Colours: Royal Purple, Red, Gold
- Manager: Willie Wilson

The London Monarchs played in the independent Canadian Baseball League that existed for half of the summer season of 2003 before folding. They played out of Labatt Park, located in the city of London, Ontario.

The team featured mostly ex-college and ex-MLB players. Many of the players were from Canada, with a focus on local Ontario players, and others came from the Dominican Republic, Japan and the United States. The Monarchs led the east division with a 20–13 record before league officials pulled the plug on the season after the CBL all-star game.

The Monarchs' field manager was former Major League outfielder Willie Wilson. The team went through two general managers, the first being former pro umpire Kirk Sawyers. Shortly after the regular season began, Sawyers and several other prominent league employees, including ex-MLB star Ron LeFlore, resigned en masse.

The Monarchs hosted the inaugural CBL game, which was nationally televised. More than 5,000 people saw London defeat the Montreal Royales, 13-3, in a near-sellout. But attendance quickly dropped across the league, contributing to its demise. The Monarchs averaged less than 1,000 fans per game overall, which was around the league average; one Monarchs game only had 50 spectators.
