= Roy McKay (baseball) =

Canadian baseball player (1933–1955)

Roy Alexander McKay (August 1, 1933 – December 25, 1995) was a Canadian baseball player.

== Early life ==
McKay was born on August 1, 1933, in London, Ontario.

== Playing career ==
He signed with the Detroit Tigers organization in 1952 after spending much of his youth at Labatt Park, including a stint as batboy for the Ontario Baseball Association champions, the 1945 London Majors of the Intercounty Baseball League.

In 1953 and 1955, McKay pitched in Douglas, Georgia, United States, and Idaho Falls, Idaho, before returning to his hometown to play for the Intercounty League's London Majors where he was named the league's most valuable pitcher in 1957. In 1958, McKay's best Intercounty season as a hurler, he had a 2.79 ERA and topped the circuit in hitting batters with pitches at 16.

Off the field, McKay was a specifications writer at General Motors Ltd., Diesel Division.

== Managerial career ==
McKay managed London's senior Intercounty team from 1969 to 1972, 1974–1976 and 1981–1982, winning the Intercounty title in 1969 and 1975. The Majors also won the pennant race (atop the regular season standings) in 1964, 1965, 1968, 1969, 1970 and 1975. During McKay's years as manager, he was named an Intercounty League all-star four times—1970, 1975, 1976 and 1982.

From 1982 until mid-1995, McKay was a coach with the London Majors, owned by McKay's friend Arden Eddie.

== Roy McKay Clubhouse ==
On August 1, 1996, the c. 1937 clubhouse of the London Majors (a City of London-owned designated heritage property under the Ontario Heritage Act as of 1996) was officially renamed the Roy McKay Clubhouse (prior to a London Majors' game), with a commemorative boulder and plaque placed in front of the historic structure with the help of the London Majors, the Intercounty Baseball League and the Friends of Labatt Park. A large portion of the game's proceeds were donated to the Canadian Spinal Research Organization..

"I would like to be remembered for being a devoted son and brother, a loving husband, a great father and a damn good friend."—Roy McKay, 1933-1995

Roy McKay's son, Alex, played for the London Majors at second base for many years in the 1980s and 1990s and also managed the team in 1996.

There is a crimson king maple tree planted by the McKay family just inside the front gates of Labatt Park that is a memorial tree to Roy McKay (with a plaque at its base) and McKay's uniform (jersey #16) has been retired by the London Majors.
