= Labatt Park =

Baseball stadium in London, Ontario

Coordinates: 42°59′1.00″N 81°15′31.20″W

Labatt Memorial Park

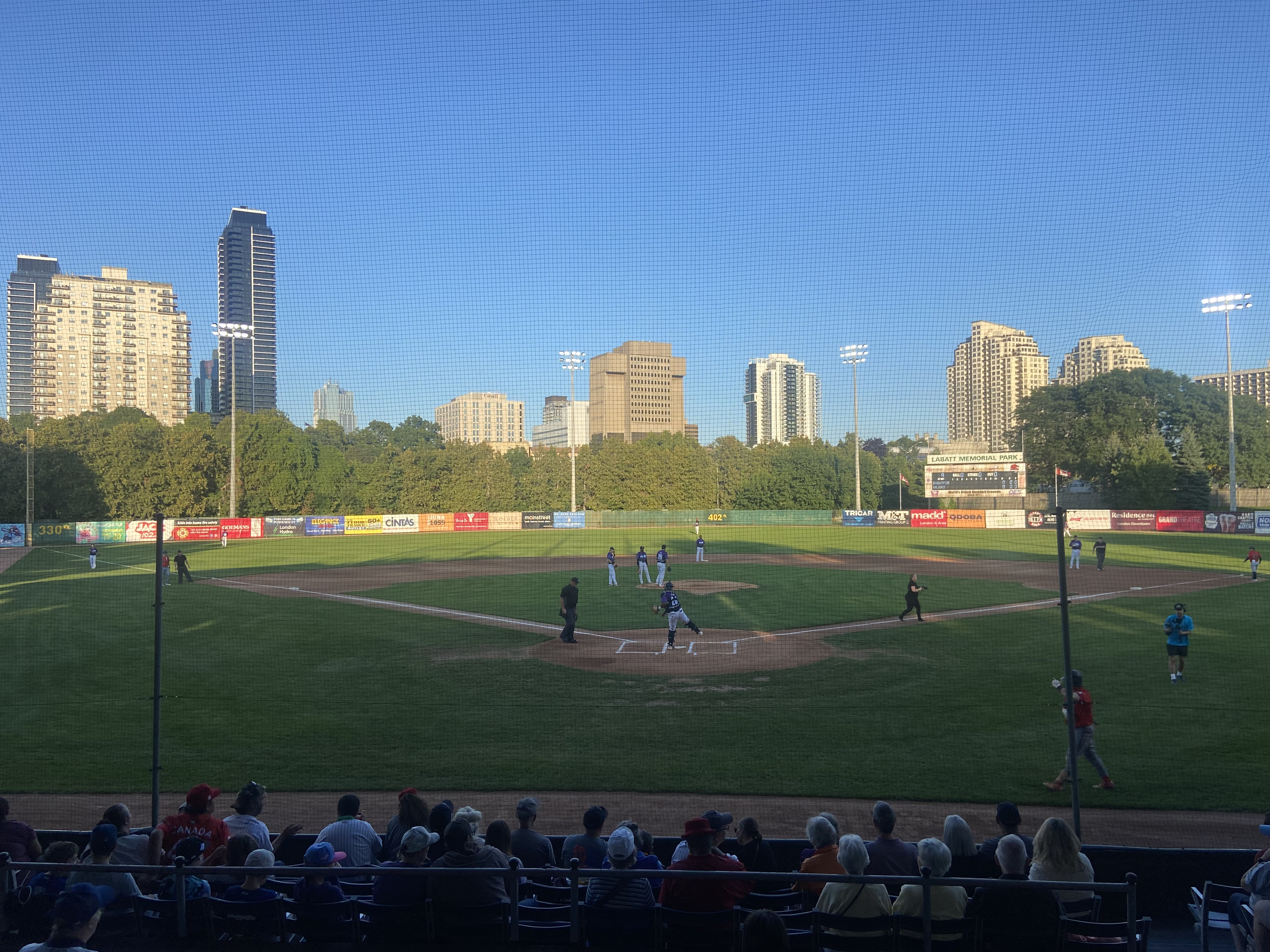
- The park during a game in 2026
- Interactive map of Labatt Memorial Park
- Former names: Tecumseh Park
- Location: London, Ontario, Canada
- Owner: City of London
- Capacity: 5,200
- Surface: Grass
- Field size: 330 ft (100 m) down the lines; 402 ft (123 m) to centre field

Construction
- Opened: May 3, 1877; 149 years ago
- Renovated: 1883, 1937, 1950s (side stands), 1989 (added more side stands), 2001
- Cost: 2000 (new Grandstand): $1.97-million
- Architect: Tillman Ruth Mocellin

Tenants
- London Tecumsehs (IA) (1877–1878; 1888–1890); London Alerts (1897, 1899); London Cockneys (IL) (1899, 1908); London Cockneys (CL) (1911); London Tecumsehs (CL) (1912–1915); London Tecumsehs (M-OL) (1919–1924); London Indians (M-OL) (1925); London Majors (CBL) (1925–present); London Tecumsehs (OL) (1930); London Pirates (PONY League) (1940–1941); London Tigers (EL) (1989–1993); London Werewolves (FL) (1999–2001); London Monarchs (CBL) (2003); Western Mustangs (OUA) (2006–present); London Rippers (FL) (2012)

Labatt Memorial Park (formerly Tecumseh Park, 1877–1936) is a baseball stadium near the forks of the Thames River in central London, Ontario, Canada. It is the oldest continually operating baseball grounds, with a history dating back to 1877. Since December 31, 1936, Labatt Park has been owned by the City of London.

The park is currently home to the London Majors of the Canadian Baseball League and the Western Mustangs. It has previously hosted numerous minor league and independent baseball teams. Several notable sportspeople have played for London teams at Labatt Park, including Greasy Neale and Charlie Gehringer, who were inducted into the Football and Baseball Hall of Fame, respectively.

== History ==
=== Commons area at the riverforks ===
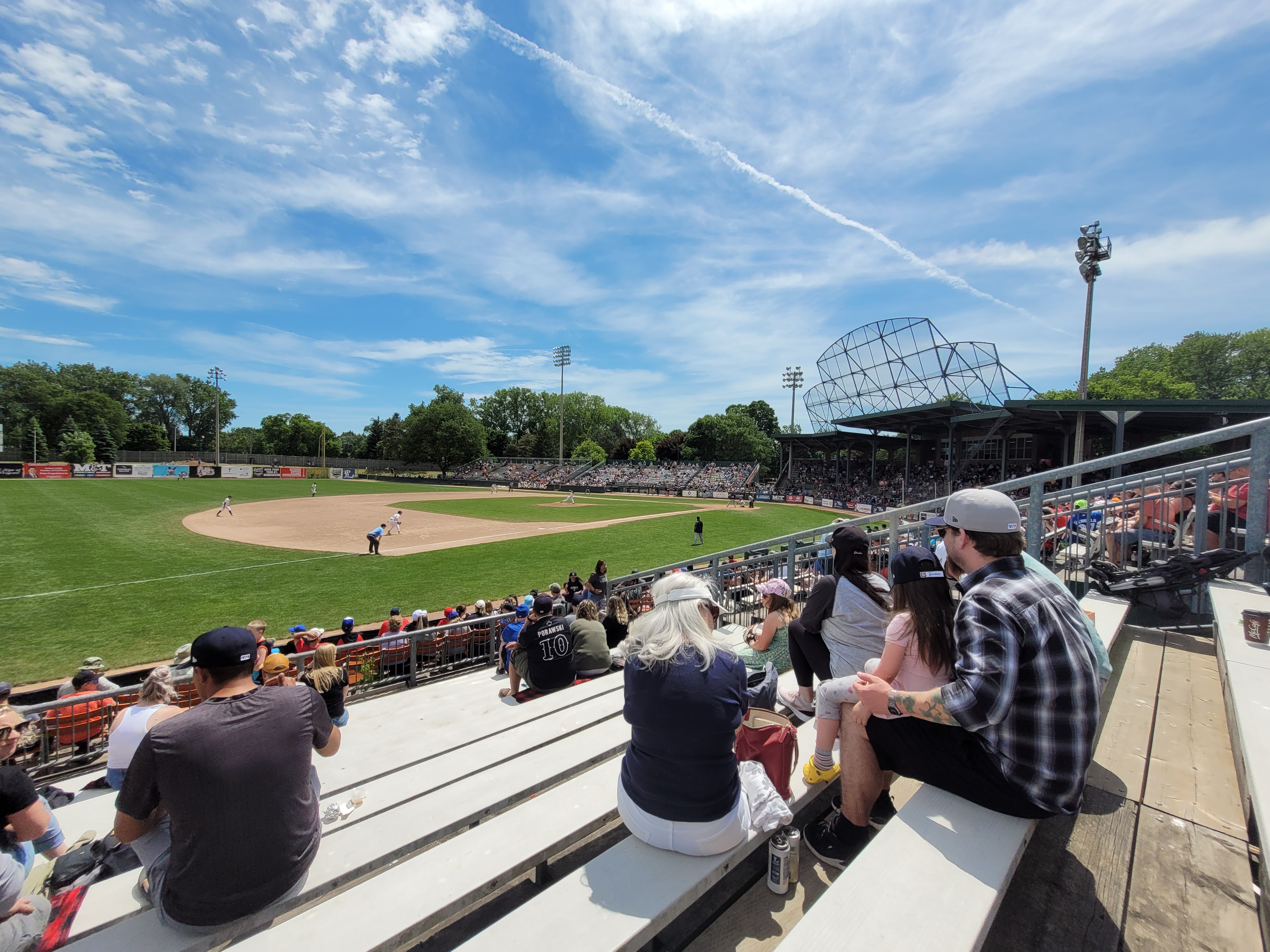
Opened in 1877, Labatt Park is the world's oldest continually operating baseball grounds

According to Seneca College's Professor Bill Humber, a noted Canadian baseball historian and author, the site of today's Labatt Park was likely used for recreational games when it was a grassy commons area at the riverforks, prior to becoming Tecumseh Park in 1877.

Baseball's roots are in the immediate area around London. The game of baseball, a derivative of the British game of rounders, had probably arrived in the area from nearby Beachville, Ontario, where the world's first recorded baseball game was played in 1838. (See Baseball Before We Knew It and Origins of baseball for other possible origins).

=== London Tecumsehs ===
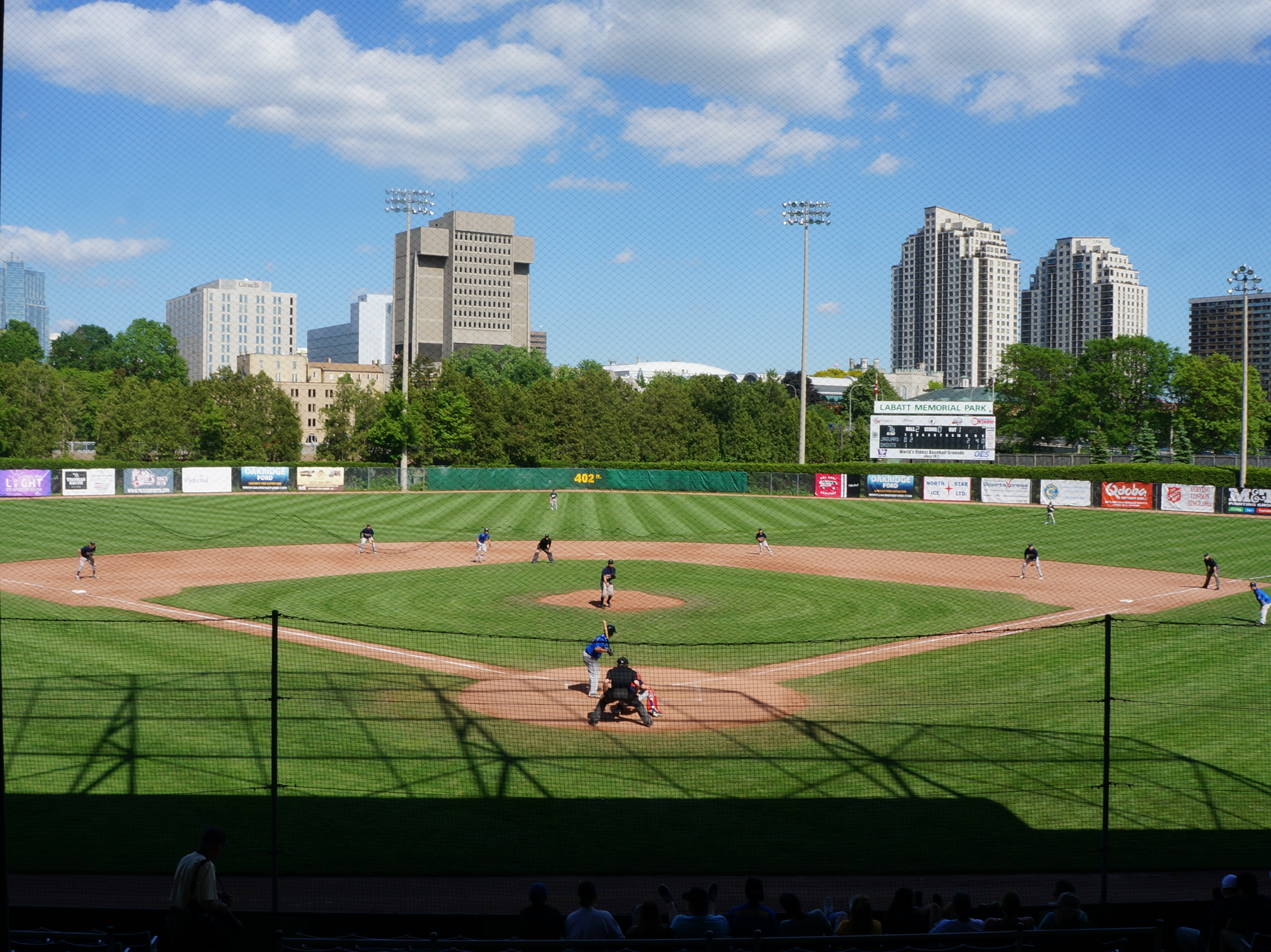
Labatt Memorial Park in 2017

The founding of the London Tecumsehs Baseball Club in 1868 ultimately led to the creation of Tecumseh Park in 1877. Created by London china merchant W. J. Reid, Tecumseh Park was named after the Shawnee Chief Tecumseh who fought alongside the British during the War of 1812 and who died in the Battle of the Thames near Chatham, Ontario, in October 1813. According to the London Advertiser of May 4, 1877, the first game at the new baseball park was held on May 3, 1877, with a contest between the London Tecumsehs and its junior team, the London Atlantics. The Tecumsehs won 5-1.

To wit: "The first regular game of baseball of the season was played yesterday afternoon in the presence of fully a thousand people. The new grounds are the most complete of every respect of any of the kind in Canada, and but few American cities have a convenient playing field."

On May 24, 1877, before 8,000 fans, the National League champion Boston Red Stockings played the London Tecumsehs of the fledgling International Association, with its star pitcher and later Chicago White Stocking stalwart, Fred Goldsmith. Boston narrowly defeated London, 7-6.

That same year, the Tecumsehs defeated the National League's Boston Red Stockings in an exhibition game at Tecumseh Park and later in the season they defeated the Pittsburgh Allegheny 5-2 to win the International Association pennant. More than 6,000 people attended London's pennant-winning game in a park built to seat 600.

On September 15, 1920, with Ty Cobb in the lineup, the Detroit Tigers defeated the London Tecumsehs 5-4 before 3,000 people at Tecumseh Park in exhibition baseball. Reserved seating for the game was $1.

On May 9, 1921, under manager George Gibson, the Pittsburgh Pirates beat the London Tecumsehs 8-7 at Tecumseh Park before 3,500 people in an exhibition baseball game. Before the game, Gibson and his team were presented with a silver loving cup by the London Kiwanis Club. Gibson thrilled the locals by catching the opening inning with his 1909 World Series-winning battery mate Babe Adams and singling and scoring a run in his lone at-bat.

On September 14, 1921, the Tecumsehs won the Michigan-Ontario Baseball League championship, 1-0 over Bay City, Michigan, before 1,000 people at Tecumseh Park.

On May 23, 1923, Washington's pitching ace Walter Johnson was in uniform but did not pitch as the Washington Senators defeated the Tecumsehs 13-9 in an exhibition baseball game at Tecumseh Park.

=== Thames River flood of 1883 ===
Tecumseh Park was damaged by a flood of the Thames River on July 11, 1883 which destroyed the original grandstands, located near today's outfield foul ball lines. Originally, home plate was located in today's left-centre field. The new replacement grandstand (1883–1937) was built facing east toward downtown London, with home plate moved to approximately the same location as it is today.

Beginning in 1892 the park was used for amateur and professional bicycle races, attracting such international stars as Harley Davidson (the Canadian Wheelman, a late-19th century cycling magazine was started and published in London).

Baseball continued to be played there as well, with three more incarnations of the Tecumsehs in the International Association (1888–1889), the International League (1890), and the Canadian League (1898–circa 1915), with the London Alerts, also of the Canadian League, playing in 1897 and 1899. Meanwhile, in 1895 the park was the site of the first-ever motion picture display in London, organized by the London Bicycle Club.

From 1912 to 1914, Earle Neale played baseball at Labatt Park before he started his major-league career with the Cincinnati Reds in 1916, later becoming an award-winning and innovative football coach in American pro football.

In 1940 and 1941, the London Pirates played in the Pennsylvania–Ontario–New York League, more commonly known as the PONY League. It was during this period that lights were installed at Labatt Park to permit night baseball.

=== Negro leagues and other players ===
During the first half of the 20th century, Labatt Park (Tecumseh Park until December 31, 1936) was regularly visited by numerous barnstorming Negro teams from the U.S., plus a much-celebrated visit by legendary African-American pitcher Satchel Paige on June 30, 1954, when Paige was barnstorming with a baseball version of the Harlem Globetrotters. Paige pitched the last three innings of an exhibition game against another legendary barnstorming team—The House of David baseball team, who all sported beards and long hair and travelled with their own generator-powered lights (before Labatt Park installed lights in the early 1940s), which featured noted baseball clown, Frank (Bobo) Nickerson.

Additionally, numerous former players with the Negro leagues played in the Senior Intercounty Baseball League after the Negro leagues gradually folded after Jackie Robinson broke the "colour barrier" in 1947, including pitcher Ted Alexander of the Kansas City Monarchs and the Homestead Grays (1950-51 London Majors); Wilmer Fields (Brantford Red Sox); Jimmy Wilkes (retired jersey #5 for the Brantford Red Sox, later became a City league umpire after a decade with Brantford); Gentry (Geep) Jessup (Galt Terriers); Larry Cunningham (Galt Terriers, Hamilton Cardinals); Ed Steele (Galt) and Shanty Clifford (Galt and Brantford); Luther Clifford; Max Manning; Lester Lockett; Bob Thurman and Stanley Glenn (St. Thomas Elgins); all made numerous appearances at Labatt Park in the 1950s.

=== Tecumseh Park becomes Labatt Park ===
According to the 1926 Geodetic Survey of Canada (and the subsequent detailed maps printed in 1928), there was a structure situated near what is now the main entrance to the ballpark at 25 Wilson Avenue (at the time, the two entrances to the ballpark were off of Dundas Street—now Riverside Drive—including an art deco entranceway that was demolished in the early 1980s).

According to Mooney Gibson's nephew, George Lambourn, a noted baseball historian in his own right, the residence at 27 Wilson Avenue was the home of the park's cranky caretaker, Jakey Butts, which was destroyed by the Thames River flood of 1937.

This devastating flood damaged the park again, necessitating the construction of the park's third grandstand (1937–2001) and a new clubhouse, with the local Labatt Brewing Company donating $10,000 to renovate the park, as well as deeding the park itself to the City of London on December 31, 1936, with the written provisions that the park remain a public athletic park in perpetuity and that it be renamed "The John Labatt Memorial Athletic Park."

At the end of August during the 1950s, Labatt Park annually hosted athletes from across the city's playgrounds competing in a variety of sports during a two- to three-day event, called the "Junior Olympiad."

=== Frank Colman and Tom Burgess ===
Other London notables to graduate to the Major Leagues from Labatt Park during the 1940s are Tom (Tim) Burgess (1927–2008) and Frank Colman (1918–1983).

In 1936, Frank Colman started out at Labatt Park with the London Winery of the Senior Intercounty Baseball League, winning the Most Valuable Player award, batting title and Intercounty Baseball League championship. Colman was 25 when he broke into the major leagues as a right fielder with the Pittsburgh Pirates, playing with them from 1942 through 1946, before he moved to New York to play with the Yankees. He played with the Yankees in 1946 and 1947, where he roomed with Yankee catcher Yogi Berra. He finished his six-year major league career with 571 at-bats, 15 home runs and 106 RBIs.

Colman returned to London in 1954 after playing in the minor leagues and being the player/coach of the Toronto Maple Leafs of the AAA International League from 1951–1953. He bought the London Majors and, as player/ owner, won the Intercounty League title in 1956 and the Great Lakes championship in 1957 before returning to the Intercounty League in 1958 and selling the team in 1959.

Colman is also a co-founder of the Eager Beaver Baseball Association (EBBA) in London which has provided competitive league play for thousands of youngsters since its founding in 1955. In 1984, a year after Colman's death, the EBBA's all-star day in mid-July was renamed "Frank Colman Day."

Colman was inducted into the Canadian Baseball Hall of Fame & Museum in 1999 and the London Sports Hall of Fame in 2005.

In a letter to the Canadian Baseball Hall of Fame in 1999, Yogi Berra wrote that he visited Colman at his home in Canada on several occasions.

"I've made a lot of friends in baseball through the years, but I'll always remember Frank as one of the most decent and genuine people that I ever met", Berra wrote. "I was proud that he was my friend."

Tom Burgess first signed a pro contract with St. Louis in 1946 and played right field and first base for the St. Louis Cardinals from 1954 to 1961 and right field and first base for the Los Angeles Angels from 1962–1963.

"[Former P.U.C. recreation director] Bill Farquharson gave me the opportunity from the playground days and I worked my way up to the big leagues where I made a living for 44 years."—Tom (Tim) Burgess, November 28, 2005

Since 1968, Burgess has been involved in Major League Baseball in a variety of managing, coaching and instructor capacities with several organizations, including the St. Louis Cardinals from 1968 to 1975, the New York Mets from 1976 to 1977, the Texas Rangers from 1980 to 1984, the Detroit Tigers from 1985 to 1987, the Kansas City Royals from 1987 to 1995. From 1996 to the present day, Burgess has been an instructor with both Baseball Canada and the Ontario Baseball Association. He was inducted into the Canadian Baseball Hall of Fame & Museum in 1992 and the London Sports Hall of Fame in 2003.

=== London Supremes and London Army Team ===
During World War II (1942 onward), the park was the home field for several women's baseball, softball and fastball teams, including the London Supremes who played in the Michigan–Ontario Women's Fastball League into the 1950s. In 1943 and 1944, the London Army Team won the Canadian Sandlot title.

Shortly after World War II Labatt Park was the home of the London Majors, which won the Canadian Sandlot Congress in 1947 and the Can-Am Baseball Congress championship in 1948, beating the Fort Wayne, Indiana, General Electrics in a best-of-seven-game series at Labatt Park, as well as winning the Canadian, Ontario and Intercounty titles.

=== Denny McLain and Fergie Jenkins ===
In 1974, after Cy Young Award-winning pitcher Denny McLain had retired from the major leagues (two years earlier), McLain played a season for the London Majors, restricting himself to home games at Labatt Park. Due to arm problems, however, McLain only pitched nine innings for the Majors, but did play in 14 games at either shortstop, first base and catcher and batted .380, including hitting two homers in one game in London.

After Cy Young Award-winning pitcher Fergie Jenkins pitched his final major league game on September 26, 1983, London Majors' owner-player Arden Eddie convinced Jenkins to pitch for the Majors in 1984-85, commuting from his home near Chatham, Ontario. The Canadian-born Jenkins is one of the few MLB players to have been inducted into both the Baseball Hall of Fame & Museum in Cooperstown, New York and the Canadian Baseball Hall of Fame & Museum in St. Marys, Ontario, Canada.

=== Tigers, Werewolves and Monarchs ===
Professional baseball declined in London after the war, with mostly amateur teams playing at Labatt Park in the following decades, until 1989 when an AA Eastern League affiliate of the Detroit Tigers was established by investors/ Board of Directors, President Dan Ross, Vice President Mike Tucker, Vice President and General Manager Bob Gilson, Vice President and Assistant General Manager General Manager Bill Wilkinson and Vice President Brian Costello.

Immediately prior to the London Tigers' inaugural season at Labatt Park in 1989, numerous improvements were completed at the park costing approximately $1-million for new lights, new dressing rooms and dugouts, additional seating, field and entrance upgrades, food concession enhancements and a new 40-foot (12 m)-by-19-foot electronic scoreboard (partially sponsored by Labatt Breweries). Previously, the scoreboard was changed manually. In 1990, Labatt Park and its head groundskeeper Mike Regan, won the prestigious "Beam Clay Award" as the best natural-grass field in North America.

Broadcasting the Tigers' games on TV London with veteran local sportscaster Pete James were former Tiger greats Mickey Lolich and later, Denny McLain.

The 1990 London Tigers won the Eastern League title under manager Chris Chambliss (one of the Tigers' players was Travis Fryman), but the Tom Runnells-managed Tigers relocated to Trenton, New Jersey after the 1993 season, citing declining attendance.

On January 20, 1990, In Houston, Texas, Labatt Park was named the "Beam Clay Baseball Diamond of the Year" for "excellence and professionalism in maintaining an outstanding professional baseball diamond"—due to the outstanding groundskeeping work of City of London employee/supervisor, Mike Regan and his assistant Rob Garrett.

The park was considered for the filming of the 1992 movie A League of Their Own starring Madonna and Geena Davis, but filming could not fit around the home schedule of the Double A London Tigers of the Eastern League.

The London Werewolves of the fledgling Frontier League played at the park from 1999 to 2001, winning the Frontier League championship in 1999; Werewolves pitcher Brett Gray tossed 25 strikeouts on June 3, 2000 (home opener), against the Chillicothe (Ohio) Paints. The game's scorecard and Brett Gray's jersey were donated to the Canadian Baseball Hall of Fame & Museum in St. Marys, Ontario, by Werewolves' General Manager John Kuhn.

In 2001 after the circa-1937 main grandstand was demolished and a new, $1.97-million, wheelchair-accessible main grandstand was built (the park's fourth) and a new "pop-up" underground irrigation system was installed, the park was used as the chief baseball venue for the Canada Summer Games.

In 2003 the park was also home to the London Monarchs of the short-lived Canadian Baseball League, which folded mid-season due to financial difficulties. The team's manager was former Major Leaguer Willie Wilson and featured such stars as first-baseman Francisco Cabrera and pitcher Amaury Telemaco. The league's inaugural game and home opener for the London Monarchs was held at Labatt Park on May 21, 2003, and was televised nationally on The Score. It also featured a fly-over by the Canadian Snowbirds flying team. League Commissioner Fergie Jenkins was also in attendance.

=== Beehive of activity ===
Along with bicycle racing, Labatt Park has in the past been used for soccer, fastball, softball, high-school and men's football, track and field, wrestling, boxing, winter skating, political rallies, showjumping, civic receptions, the Royal Canadian Mounted Police (RCMP) Musical Ride and a 21-gun salute to Her Majesty Queen Elizabeth II during her visit to London's Victoria Park on June 26, 1997.

Currently, the park is home to the London Majors of the Intercounty League and the London Badgers junior team, as well as several other youth and adult baseball teams. The UWO Mustangs Baseball Club managed by former London Majors/AA London Tigers/AAA Toledo Mud Hens pitcher Mike Lumley is using the park during the 2006 Ontario University Athletics (OUA) baseball season (in 2005, the Mustangs won the OUA baseball title at Labatt Park for the first time, beating Brock University) Badgers in the final best-of-three championship series. The Western Mustangs repeated as OUA champs in 2006, beating Brock two games to nothing (7-4, 5-0) at Labatt Park on October 21.

It should also be noted that Ted Giannoulas, aka "The Famous Chicken" sports mascot, was born and raised in London, Ontario, and during the years 1965 to 1967 worked part-time at Labatt Park during baseball games changing the old manual scoreboard in right field for 25 cents a game.

=== Roy McKay Clubhouse, home to the London Majors ===
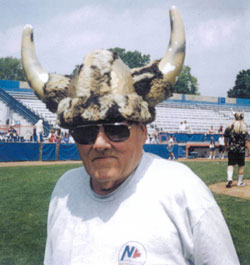
Norm Aldridge at Labatt Park in May 1998 during the fundraising ballgame, The Rumble at the Riverforks. Aldridge, trainer with the 1948 Majors, also has a baseball diamond named after him in northeast London, Ontario -- Norm Aldridge Field. PHOTO: Herb Walsh

In 1996, the "Reasons for Designation" for the park under the Ontario Heritage Act were amended to include the circa-1937, tongue-and-groove clapboard clubhouse of the London Majors, renamed the "Roy McKay Clubhouse" on August 1, 1996 (McKay was born on August 1), by Majors' longtime player/owner Arden Eddie in honour of former pitcher, manager and coach Roy McKay who died on Christmas Day in 1995, six months after falling on the porch of his Waterloo Street home. Subsequently, a large commemorative rock and bronze plaque honouring Roy McKay, jersey #16, was installed at the front of the clubhouse.

See a photo of the Roy McKay Clubhouse here.

"I would like to be remembered for being a devoted son and brother, a loving husband, a great father and a damn good friend."—Roy McKay, 1933–1995

To help raise money for a new cedar-shingle roof on the historic clubhouse, a ballgame dubbed "The Rumble at the Riverforks" was played at the park on May 31, 1998, featuring members of London city council, members of the local media and the London Majors' oldtimers. The game was organized by The Friends of Labatt Park, SCENE magazine and the London Majors.

On June 18, 2005, veteran Intercounty Baseball League umpire Joe Serratore was married to bride Bren Ferguson at home plate before 200 friends and family members, with United Church minister Reverend Susan Eagle (who, at the time, was a member of London city council) officiating. The home-plate wedding ceremony is believed to be a first for the ballpark.

=== Labatt Park Reunion, 2005 ===
On Saturday, July 23, 2005, the City of London in conjunction with the London Sports Council, the London Sports Oldtimers Association, the London Majors Baseball Club and The Friends of Labatt Park, organized a special, day-long event at the park to commemorate the city's 150th anniversary as an incorporated municipality (more than 10,000 residents) and the park's 128-year-old history. The event featured an open baseball clinic for youngsters run by the London Majors, vintage ball games, displays of park/ baseball memorabilia and a Majors' oldtimers' reunion.

In 2006, London photo-historian Stephen Harding spent two days photographing the interior and exterior of the Roy McKay Clubhouse and presented his photos/ report to the City's heritage planner as City staff formulate plans to make additional repairs to the 70-year-old structure.

=== Baseball Day in London, 2006 ===
London Majors' SS Mike Ambrose (left; a third-generation player with the London Majors) and first-team-all-star Kyle Piwowarczyk (2B) at the historic Roy McKay Clubhouse at Labatt Park on Canada Day 2006, when the Friends of Labatt Park opened the clubhouse to the public to view historical baseball displays. PHOTO: Stephen Harding

On July 1 (Canada Day), 2006, London held its second annual Baseball Day, organized by the City of London, The Friends of Labatt Park, Fanshawe Pioneer Village, the London Majors Baseball Club, the London Oldtimers' Sports Association, the London and District Baseball Association and the London Sports Council.

The day featured an open, drop-in baseball clinic with the London Majors, historical displays in the Roy McKay Clubhouse, a 1923 Wurlitzer Military Band Organ (restored and owned and operated by Ken Vinen of Aylmer, Ontario), a vintage base ball game between Fanshawe Pioneer Village's London Tecumsehs and Bruce Huff's Thames River Ratz (the Ratz won 15-3), a pitch, hit and run competition and a doubleheader between the London Majors and the Toronto Maple Leafs of the Intercounty Baseball League (London won both games, 9-1 and 3-2).

== Oldest and continuously operated park ==
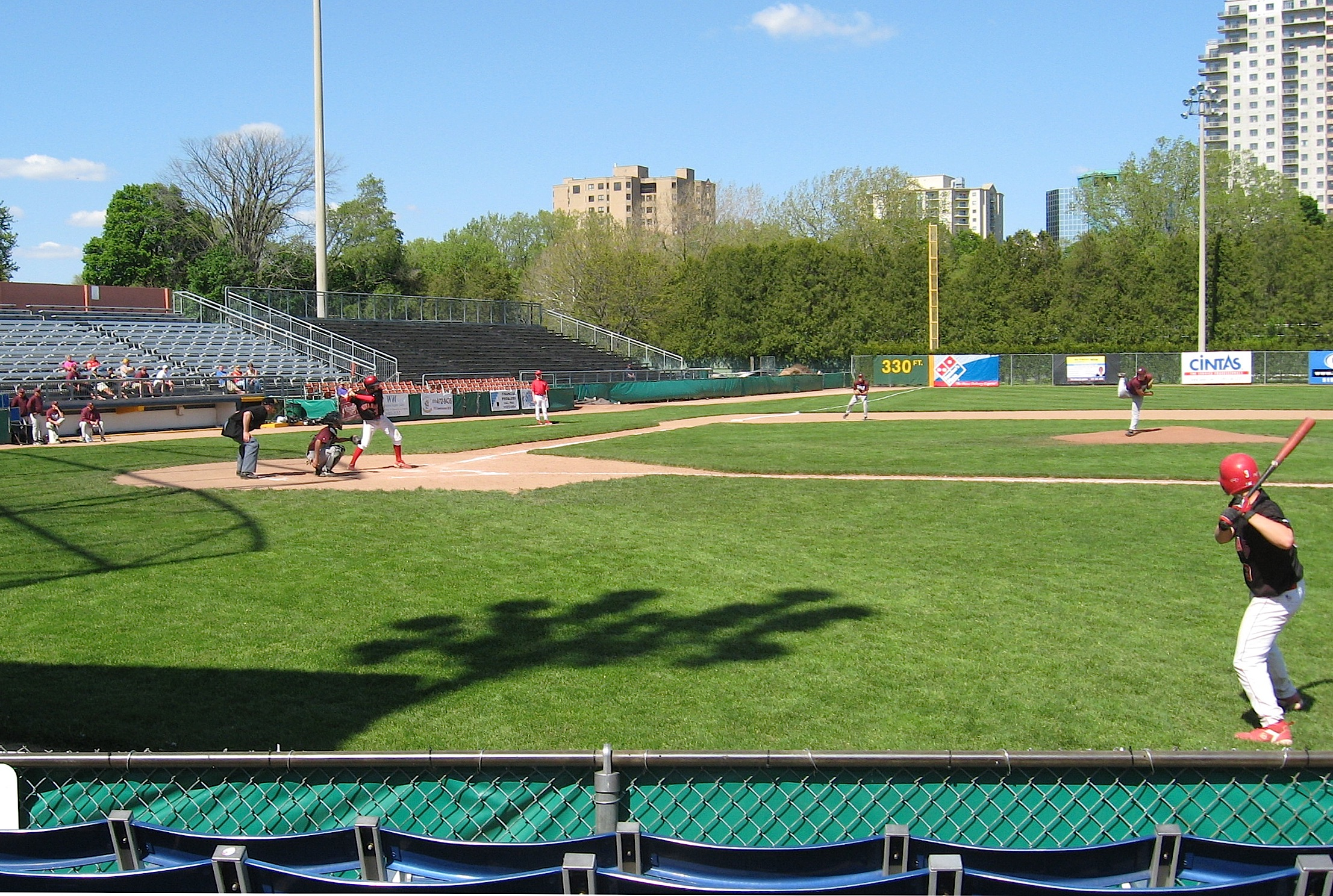
The park during a game in 2010

University of Western Ontario professor Bob Barney and graduate student Riley Nowokowski began investigating the history of Labatt Park, following an American challenge to its claim as baseball's "oldest and continuously operated" park. Barney and Nowokowski spent three years researching 143 years of the park's history, with their article: "A Canadian National Treasure: Tecumseh/Labatt Memorial Park, Baseball History's Oldest, Continuously-Operating Ballpark", published in the Fall 2021 issue of Ontario History. The City of London subsequently applied for Labatt Park to be granted national heritage site distinction.

Fuller Field in Clinton, Massachusetts, made it into the Guinness Book of World Records in September 2007 as the "world's oldest continually used baseball diamond/ field", dating back to 1878—a year after Tecumseh Park-Labatt Park opened in 1877—as Fuller Field's home plate and bases have purportedly remained in the same location since 1878, whereas home plate at Labatt Park has been moved (within the same field) from its original location in 1877.

In September 2008, however, Labatt Park replaced Clinton, Massachusetts', Fuller Field in the 2009 Guinness Book of World Records (page 191) as the "World's Oldest Baseball Diamond." Although it has flip flopped in the past, as of January 4, 2016, Guinness's online record for the World's Oldest Baseball Field/Diamond now states Labatt Park, London, Ontario. World's Oldest Baseball Field

On May 30, 1994, the park was designated by London City Council under Part IV of the Ontario Heritage Act as an historic site via by-Law No. L.S.P.-3237-544, with the ceremonial plaque unveiling at the front gates of the park occurring on July 1 (Canada Day), 1994, prior to a doubleheader between the London Majors and Toronto Maple Leafs of the Intercounty Baseball League.

The park's designation occurred after a six-month-long lobbying effort spearheaded by the volunteer, non-profit organization, The Friends of Labatt Park, which has undertaken a number of initiatives during the past 24 years to enhance and promote the ballpark, its history and ambience.

== See also ==
- Rickwood Field, the oldest professional baseball park in the United States

== Sources ==
- The Northern Game: Baseball the Canadian Way by Bob Elliott (Sport Classic, 2005).
- Heritage Baseball: City of London a souvenir program from July 23, 2005, celebrating the history of Labatt Park and London, Ontario's 150th anniversary as an incorporated city.
- Pitcher has Paige in London's history by James Reaney, The London Free Press, Sunday, May 2, 2004, page T-7.
- Monarchs draft former Atlanta Brave by Ryan Pyette, The London Free Press, April 16, 2003.
- Boys of Summer: Knute, Boot, Milky and Buck by Don Maudsley, (SCENE magazine, London, Ontario, June 15, 2000).
- The magic continues at London's Field of Dreams by Barry Wells (SCENE magazine, London, Ontario, June 15, 2000).
- Who's Who in Canadian Sport by Bob Ferguson (Sporting Facts Publications, Ottawa, 3rd edition, 1999), ISBN 1-894282-00-0.
- Intercounty Major Baseball League's 1998 Record Book by Editor Herb Morell and Dominico Promotions Inc.
- London Majors Baseball Club, 1998 Souvenir Program.
- Jackie Robinson, A Biography by Arnold Rampersad (Alfred E. Knopf Inc., New York, 1997), ISBN 0-679-44495-5. (page 113)
- Diamonds of the North: A Concise History of Baseball in Canada by William Humber (Oxford University Press, 1995), ISBN 0-19-541039-4.
- The Beaver, Exploring Canada's History, Baseball's Canadian Roots: Abner Who? by Mark Kearney October–November 1994.
- EBBA: 40 Years of Baseball by Jeffrey Reed (Eager Beaver Baseball Association, Inc., London, Ontario, 1994), ISBN 0-9698289-0-X.
- The 1948 London Majors: A Great Canadian Team by Dan Mendham (unpublished academic paper, UWO, December 7, 1992).
- London Tigers 1989, The Collector's Edition, Souvenir Program.
- Tiger Special: Peanuts, popcorn, crackerjack, Baseball's Back, The London Free Press, Section F, April 7, 1989.
- Diamond Rituals: Baseball in Canadian Culture by Robert K. Barney (Meckler Books, 1989).
- Journal of Sport History, A Critical Examination of a Source in Early Ontario Baseball: The Reminiscence of Adam E. Ford by UWO Professor Robert K. Barney and Nancy Bouchier (Vol. 15, No. 1, Spring 1988).
- Cheering for the Home Team: The Story of Baseball in Canada by William Humber (The Boston Mills Press, 1983), ISBN 0-919822-54-1.
- Nobody's Perfect by Denny McLain with Dave Diles (The Dial Press, New York, 1975).
- Looking Over Western Ontario: Three Tecumsehs made all-star baseball team in 1872 by Les Bronson, The London Free Press, June 17, 1972.
- Old Time Baseball and the London Tecumsehs of the late 1870s by Les Bronson, a recorded (and later transcribed) talk given to the London & Middlesex Historical Society on February 15, 1972. Available in the London Room of the Central Branch of the London Public Library.
- Bill Stern's Favorite Baseball Stories by Bill Stern, (Blue Ribbon Books, Garden City, New York, 1949).
- Mohawks Split Games Over The Week-End: Bill Horton Master Over St. Clair Nine in Saturday's Tilt, The London Free Press, July 16, 1939.
- An Eight-Page Indenture/ Instrument #33043 between The London and Western Trusts Company Limited, The Corporation of The City of London and John Labatt, Limited, dated December 31, 1936, and registered on title in the Land Registry Office for the City of London on January 2, 1937, conveying Tecumseh Park to the City of London along with $10,000 on the provisos that the athletic field be preserved, maintained and operated in perpetuity "for the use of the citizens of the City of London as an athletic field and recreation ground" and that it be renamed "The John Labatt Memorial Athletic Park."
