= Slippery Rock, Pennsylvania =

Borough in Pennsylvania, US

- Borough
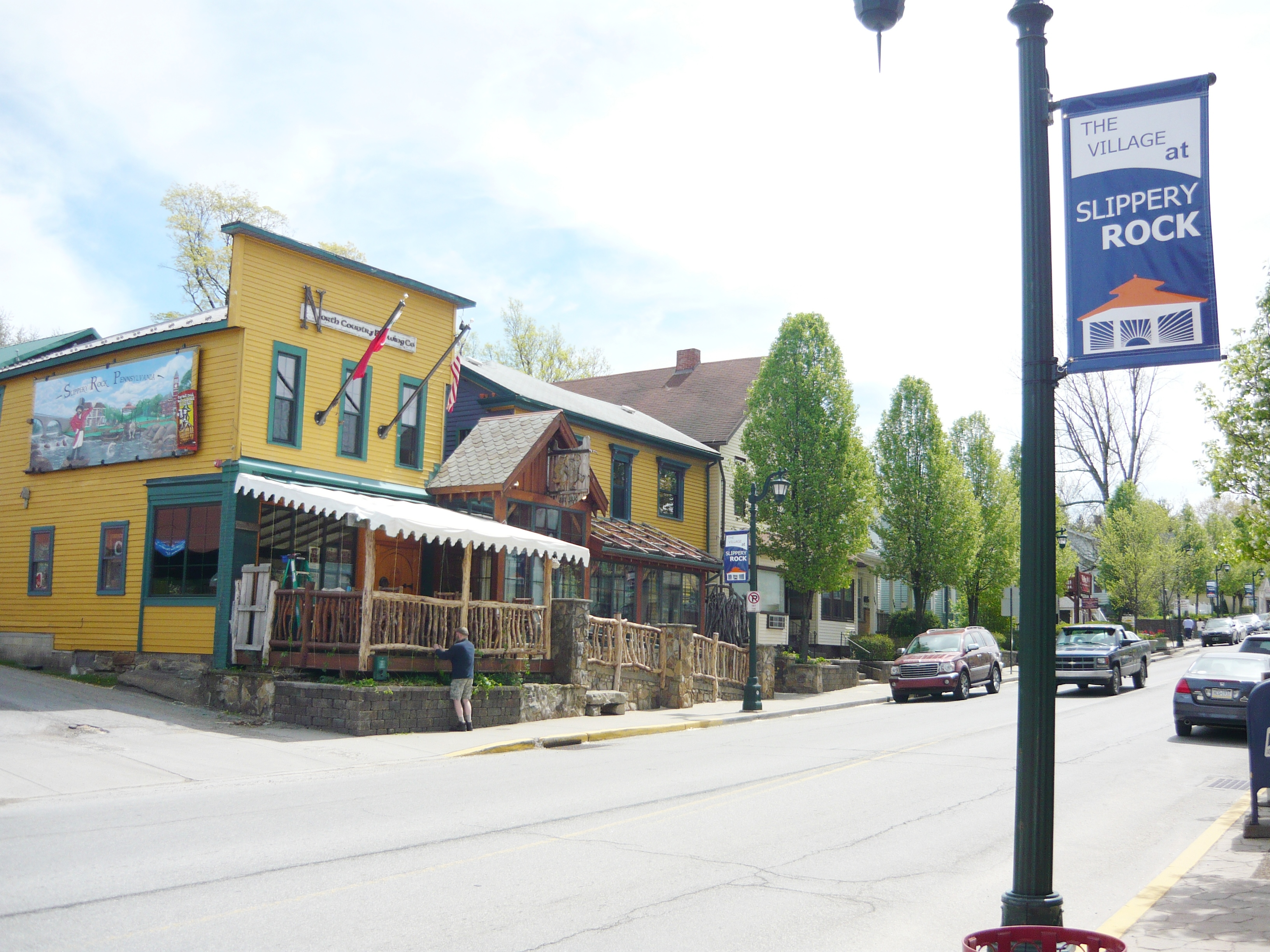
- North Main Street

- Location in Butler County, Pennsylvania

- Location in Pennsylvania Location in the United States
- Coordinates: 41°03′49″N 80°03′18″W
- Country: United States
- State: Pennsylvania
- County: Butler
- Settled: 1841

Government
  - Mayor: Jondavid R. Longo (R)

Area
  - Total: 1.64 sq mi (4.26 km^{2})
  - Land: 1.64 sq mi (4.26 km^{2})
  - Water: 0 sq mi (0.00 km^{2})

Population (2020)
  - Total: 3,081
  - Density: 1,872.5/sq mi (722.96/km^{2})
- Time zone: UTC-5 (EST)
  - Summer (DST): UTC-4 (EDT)
- ZIP code: 16057
- Area code: 724/878
- FIPS code: 42-71184
- Website: slipperyrockboroughpa.gov

Slippery Rock is a borough in Butler County, Pennsylvania. The population was 3,558 at the 2020 census. Slippery Rock is included in the Greater Pittsburgh Region. The area is home to Slippery Rock University of Pennsylvania, partially in the borough limits, and attended by nearly 9,000 students as a member of the Pennsylvania State System of Higher Education.

== History ==
The origins of the name "Slippery Rock" date back to colonial times, when members of the Seneca Nation chased European soldiers through the area where Slippery Rock lies today. While crossing a creek, the Seneca lost their footing and slipped on the moss-covered rocks of the creek. The Seneca would later name the creek Slippery Rock.

The post office for Slippery Rock Township was established in 1826 in the Ginger Hill area. The town of Ginger Hill was incorporated as a borough under the name Centreville in 1841, later changing its name to Slippery Rock in 1896 after the Slippery Rock Creek.

In 1889, Slippery Rock State Normal School was founded in the borough. In 1926, the state of Pennsylvania purchased the institution, and in 1960 the school was rebranded as Slippery Rock State College. 1983 marked the final rebrand, wherein the name Slippery Rock University of Pennsylvania was adopted. Today, Slippery Rock University plays a significant role in the community.

== Geography ==
Slippery Rock is located in northwest Butler County at 41°3′49″N 80°3′18″W (41.063746, −80.055007). According to the United States Census Bureau, the borough has a total area of 1.7 square miles (4.3 km^{2}), all land. Slippery Rock Creek, the borough's namesake, runs through a valley 2 miles (3 km) south of the borough.

The terrain around Slippery Rock is hilly, and the strip mining of coal has been a prominent commercial activity in the surrounding area, which is largely agricultural.

=== Climate ===
Climate data for Slippery Rock, Pennsylvania (1991–2020 normals, extremes 1949–present)
Month	Jan	Feb	Mar	Apr	May	Jun	Jul	Aug	Sep	Oct	Nov	Dec	Year
Record high °F (°C)	72 (22)	74 (23)	87 (31)	89 (32)	96 (36)	99 (37)	102 (39)	99 (37)	99 (37)	91 (33)	81 (27)	74 (23)	102 (39)
Mean daily maximum °F (°C)	33.4 (0.8)	36.7 (2.6)	45.7 (7.6)	58.6 (14.8)	69.3 (20.7)	76.9 (24.9)	81.3 (27.4)	80.0 (26.7)	73.7 (23.2)	61.5 (16.4)	48.9 (9.4)	38.1 (3.4)	58.7 (14.8)
Daily mean °F (°C)	25.1 (−3.8)	27.4 (−2.6)	35.5 (1.9)	46.7 (8.2)	57.1 (13.9)	65.3 (18.5)	69.7 (20.9)	68.2 (20.1)	61.8 (16.6)	50.5 (10.3)	39.7 (4.3)	30.6 (−0.8)	48.1 (8.9)
Mean daily minimum °F (°C)	16.8 (−8.4)	18.0 (−7.8)	25.3 (−3.7)	34.7 (1.5)	44.9 (7.2)	53.6 (12.0)	58.0 (14.4)	56.4 (13.6)	49.8 (9.9)	39.4 (4.1)	30.6 (−0.8)	23.2 (−4.9)	37.6 (3.1)
Record low °F (°C)	−28 (−33)	−21 (−29)	−10 (−23)	9 (−13)	22 (−6)	30 (−1)	37 (3)	28 (−2)	27 (−3)	12 (−11)	−1 (−18)	−20 (−29)	−28 (−33)
Average precipitation inches (mm)	3.47 (88)	2.69 (68)	3.41 (87)	3.94 (100)	4.14 (105)	4.76 (121)	4.63 (118)	4.02 (102)	4.07 (103)	3.45 (88)	3.47 (88)	3.19 (81)	45.24 (1,149)
Average precipitation days (≥ 0.01 in)	17.2	13.6	13.1	14.2	15.0	14.1	12.6	11.3	11.2	13.5	13.2	15.2	164.2
Source: NOAA

== Demographics ==
Historical population
Census	Pop.	Note	%±
1850	278		—
1860	347		24.8%
1870	366		5.5%
1880	418		14.2%
1890	448		7.2%
1900	993		121.7%
1910	870		−12.4%
1920	826		−5.1%
1930	1,165		41.0%
1940	1,269		8.9%
1950	2,294		80.8%
1960	2,563		11.7%
1970	4,949		93.1%
1980	3,047		−38.4%
1990	3,008		−1.3%
2000	3,068		2.0%
2010	3,625		18.2%
2020	3,081		−15.0%
U.S. Decennial Census

=== 2020 census ===
As of the 2020 census, Slippery Rock had a population of 3,081. The median age was 24.2 years. 12.1% of residents were under the age of 18 and 12.7% of residents were 65 years of age or older. For every 100 females there were 89.4 males, and for every 100 females age 18 and over there were 88.6 males age 18 and over.

99.4% of residents lived in urban areas, while 0.6% lived in rural areas.

There were 1,258 households in Slippery Rock, of which 17.5% had children under the age of 18 living in them. Of all households, 28.2% were married-couple households, 32.3% were households with a male householder and no spouse or partner present, and 35.2% were households with a female householder and no spouse or partner present. About 42.7% of all households were made up of individuals and 11.3% had someone living alone who was 65 years of age or older.

There were 1,508 housing units, of which 16.6% were vacant. The homeowner vacancy rate was 2.6% and the rental vacancy rate was 13.2%.

Racial composition as of the 2020 census
Race	Number	Percent
White	2,547	82.7%
Black or African American	126	4.1%
American Indian and Alaska Native	1	0.0%
Asian	177	5.7%
Native Hawaiian and Other Pacific Islander	0	0.0%
Some other race	59	1.9%
Two or more races	171	5.6%
Hispanic or Latino (of any race)	87	2.8%

=== 2000 census ===
As of the 2000 census, there were 3,068 people, 977 households, and 387 families residing in the borough. The population density was 1,820.4 inhabitants per square mile (702.9/km^{2}). There were 1,039 housing units at an average density of 616.5 per square mile (238.0/km^{2}). The racial makeup of the borough was 91.30% White, 3.26% African American, 0.20% Native American, 3.29% Asian, 0.07% Pacific Islander, 0.68% from other races, and 1.21% from two or more races. Hispanic or Latino of any race were 1.11% of the population.

There were 977 households, out of which 15.3% had children under the age of 18 living with them, 30.8% were married couples living together, 6.4% had a female householder with no husband present, and 60.3% were non-families. 27.7% of all households were made up of individuals, and 12.8% had someone living alone who was 65 years of age or older. The average household size was 2.38 and the average family size was 2.71.

In the borough the population was spread out, with 8.5% under the age of 18, 55.9% from 18 to 24, 15.0% from 25 to 44, 10.1% from 45 to 64, and 10.4% who were 65 years of age or older. The median age was 23 years. For every 100 females, there were 77.2 males. For every 100 females age 18 and over, there were 74.8 males.

The median income for a household in the borough was $24,554, and the median income for a family was $42,450. Males had a median income of $37,188 versus $30,104 for females. The per capita income for the borough was $13,538. About 10.1% of families and 42.6% of the population were below the poverty line, including 11.0% of those under age 18 and 8.0% of those age 65 or over.

== Sports ==
The university has many sports events and venues located in the borough. The Rock football team plays their games at Bob DiSpirito Field at N. Kerr Thompson Stadium, while the baseball team has their games at Jack Critchfield Park.

== Government and Politics ==
=== Government ===
Slippery Rock operates as a borough under Pennsylvania law. The borough uses a mayor–council government system and includes a Borough Manager. Several commissions also function under the direction of the Borough Council, most notably the Planning Commission and the Civil Service Commission. Both the mayor and the seven Borough Council members are elected to four year terms.

Jondavid Longo, a Republican, has served as mayor since 2018. As of August, 2026 the Slippery Rock Borough Council consists of:

- Jeff Campbell, Council President
- John Hicks, Council Vice-President
- Denton Zeronas
- Jenifer Ravert
- Lauren Christmann
- Alex Tuten
- Paul Lueken

=== Politics ===
Unlike much of Butler County, Slippery Rock is considered a swing borough. Slippery Rock has voted with the winner of every presidential election since 2008.

Local politics in Slippery Rock tends to favor the Republican Party. Every counselor of the seven-member Borough Council is an elected Republican.

United States Presidential Election Results for Slippery Rock Borough
Year	Democratic		Republican		Other	
Year	#	%	#	%	#	%
2024	564	45.01%	671	53.55%	18	1.44%
2020	647	53.50%	544	45.00%	18	1.50%
2016	555	45.90%	563	46.60%	90	7.50%
2012	612	55.30%	495	44.70%	0	0.00%
2008	762	58.30%	519	39.70%	26	2.00%
2004	591	56.99%	438	42.24%	8	0.77%

== Education ==
The school district is the Slippery Rock Area School District.

A portion of Slippery Rock University is within the borough limits.

== Transport ==
Since the 1960s, Slippery Rock has been served by the Interstate Highway system as Interstate 79 (north-south) and Interstate 80 (east-west) cross 12 miles (19 km) to the north. The closest access to I-79 is 4 miles (6 km) to the west on Pennsylvania Route 108. PA 258 (North Main Street) leads northwest 7.7 miles (12.4 km) to I-79.

Public transport is provided to students of Slippery Rock University through the Student Government Association's "Happy Bus" service. OurBus has operated intercity bus service between the town and New York City since May 12, 2022.

No airports are located within the borough itself, with general aviation's closest links to the city being at Grove City Airport. Pittsburgh International Airport is the closest airport with commercial service.
