= Oestrike Stadium =

Baseball stadium in Ypsilanti, Michigan

Coordinates: 42.257809°N 83.648079°W

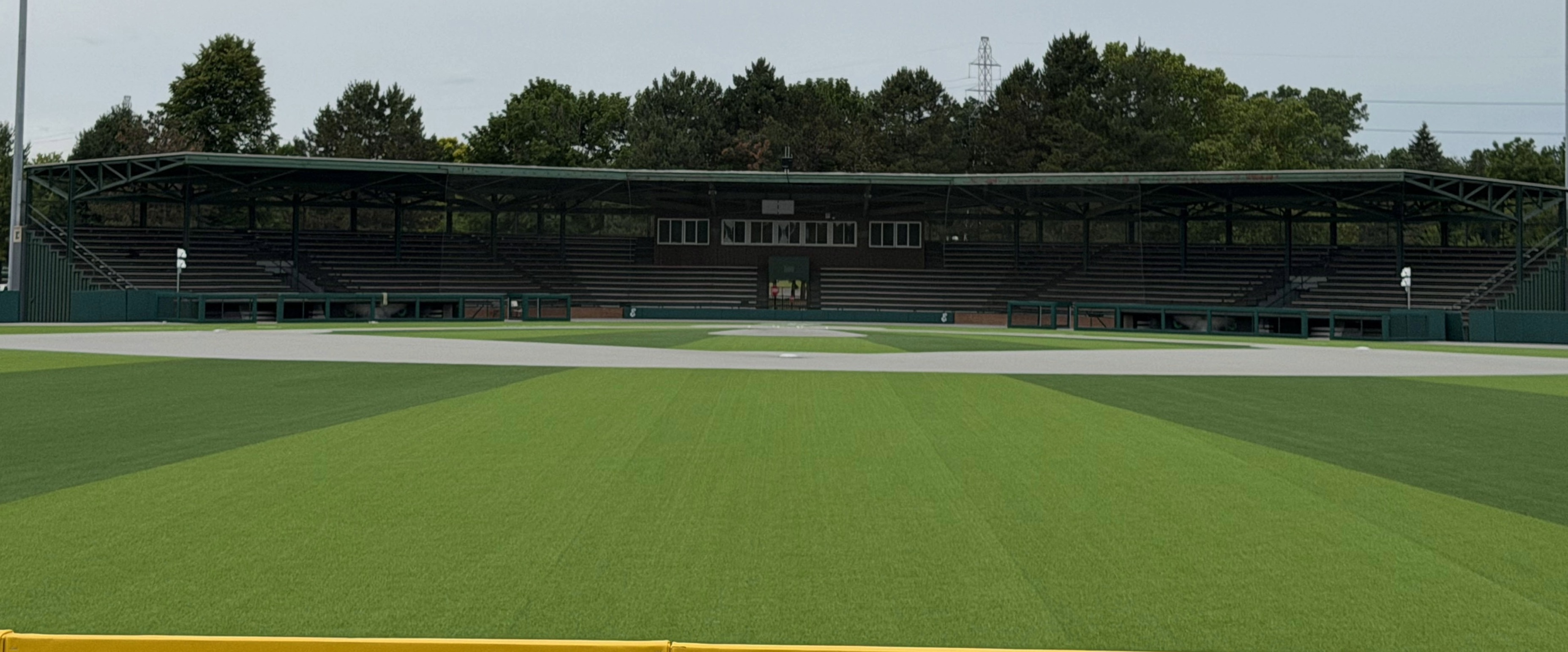
- Interactive map of Oestrike Stadium
- Location: Ypsilanti, Michigan
- Owner: Eastern Michigan University
- Operator: Eastern Michigan University
- Capacity: 2,500
- Surface: Astro Turf

Construction
- Opened: 1971

Tenants
- Eastern Michigan Eagles baseball (MAC) (1971–present); Midwest Sliders of Ypsilanti/ Oakland County Cruisers (Frontier League) (2009–2010)

Oestrike Stadium is a stadium in Ypsilanti, Michigan at Eastern Michigan University. It is named after Ron Oestrike, a former baseball coach at EMU. It is primarily used for baseball, and serves as the Eastern Michigan University Eagles baseball team home field. In addition, it served as the home field of the Midwest Sliders of Ypsilanti Frontier League baseball team in 2009 and 2010 (the Sliders were renamed the Oakland County Cruisers their second season at Oestrike Stadium as a result of their planned move to Waterford Township). Several present and former major leaguers, including Bob Welch, Bob Owchinko, Bryan Clutterbuck, Pat Sheridan, and Brian Bixler, played at Oestrike Stadium as members of the EMU baseball team.

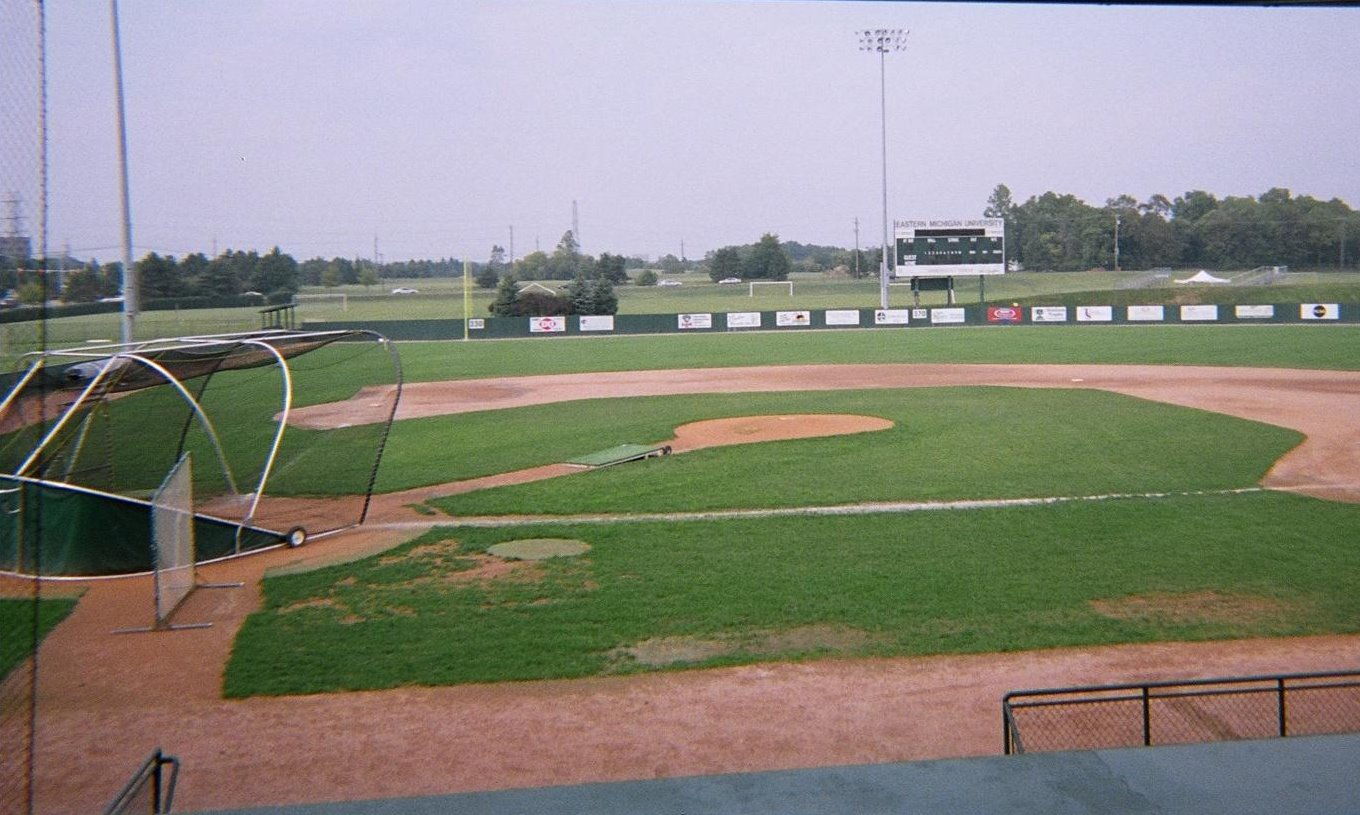
Oestrike Stadium in 2006

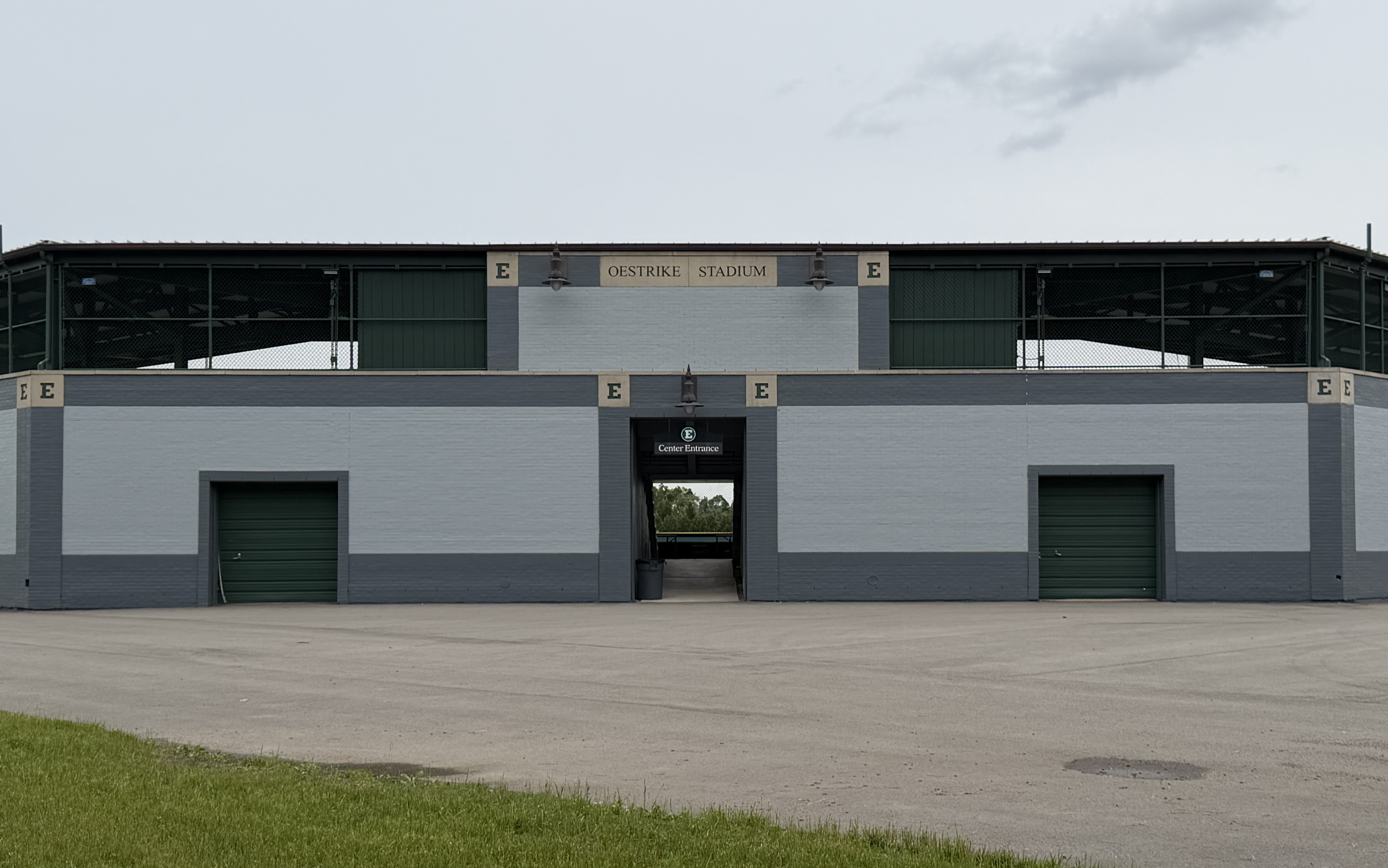
The front of the stadium in 2026

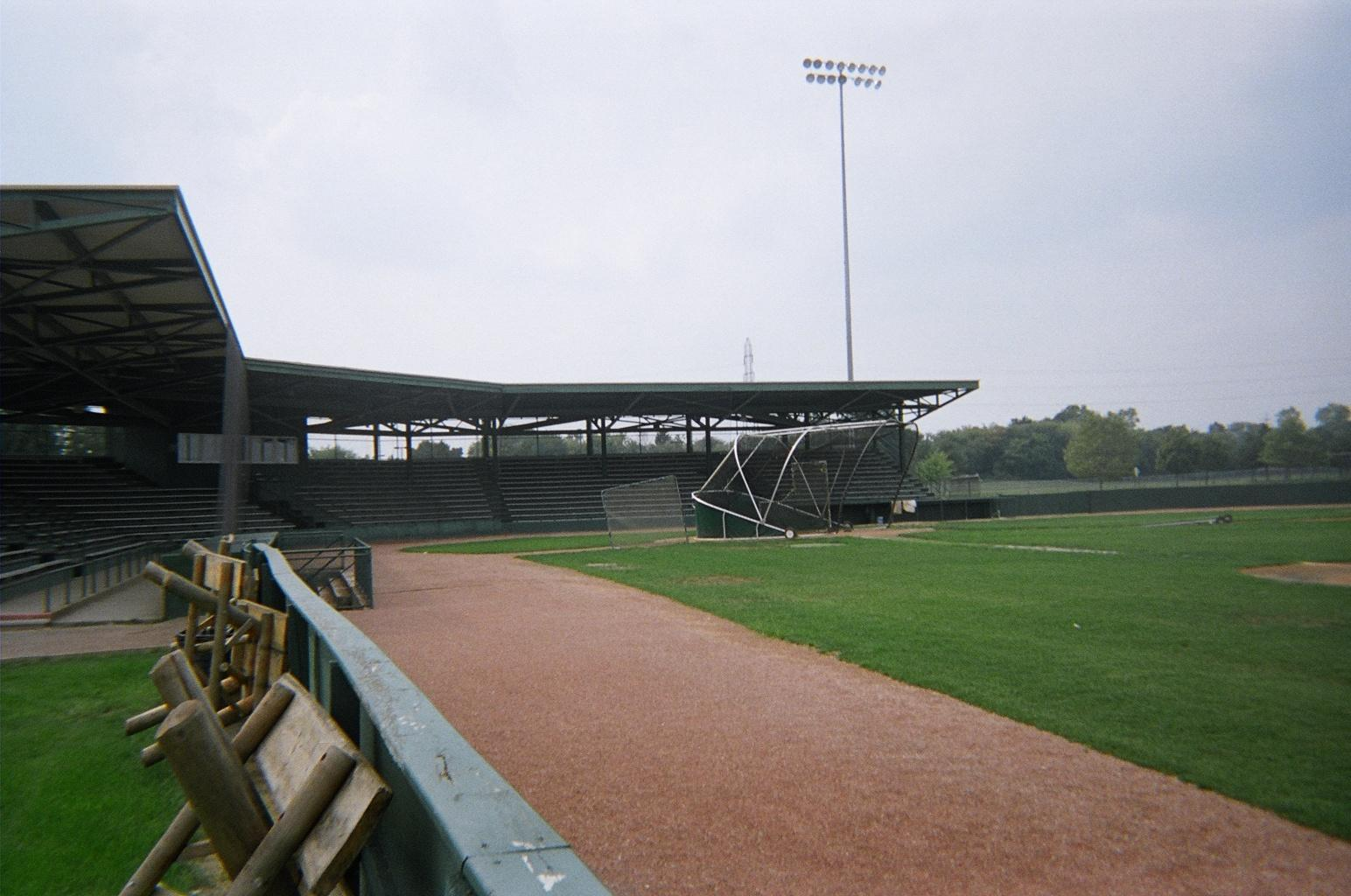
Oestrike Stadium in its final season before getting a turf infield

== History ==
Constructed in 1971, Oestrike Stadium is named after Ronald E. Oestrike. Ronald "Oak" Oestrike was a former Baseball Coach. Oestrike served as a head baseball coach from 1965 to 87. Oestrike Stadium has 2,500 seats for baseball and softball events. It hosted the Mid-American Conference baseball tournament in 2007. In 2008, Bruce Springsteen performed at Oestrike Stadium in support of Barack Obama during his presidential candidacy. The stadium has gone through several renovations to update cosmetic needs.

Following the 2025 season, the stadium underwent major renovations, converting to a synthetic playing surface that includes a gray-turfed infield and warning track. Oestrike Stadium is currently the only NCAA Division I stadium to use gray as its playing surface, similar in color to the surface at Rynearson Stadium, another Eastern Michigan–owned property.

== See also ==
- List of NCAA Division I baseball venues
