= Mid-Missouri Mavericks =

- 1994–2005; Columbia, Missouri (2003–2005) Canton, Ohio (2002) London, Ontario (1999–2001) Kalamazoo, Michigan (1996–1998) Newark, Ohio (1994–1995)

Minor league affiliations
- Previous classes: Independent
- League: Frontier League

Minor league titles
- League titles (1): 1999

Team data
- Previous names: Canton Coyotes (2002); London Werewolves (1999–2001); Kalamazoo Kodiaks (1996–1998); Newark Buffalos (1994–1995)
- Colors: Red, gold, black
- Previous parks: Taylor Stadium (2003–2005); Thurman Munson Stadium (2002); Labatt Memorial Park (1999–2001)
- Owner(s)/ Operator(s): Gary and Brad Wendt

The Mid-Missouri Mavericks were an independent baseball league team which played in Columbia, Missouri, in the United States. The team was a member of the independent Frontier League, and had no association with a Major League Baseball team. From 2003 through 2005 the team played at Taylor Stadium, the home field of the baseball team of University of Missouri. The team suspended operations during the 2006 season in order to pursue financing and construction of a new stadium. The suspension of operations was subsequently extended through the 2007, 2008 and 2009 seasons after the bankruptcy of the principal owner, Bradley Wendt.

== History ==
The Mid-Missouri franchise had a checkered history in the Frontier League. The team began in Newark, Ohio as the Newark Buffalos. The team was sold in 1996 and moved to Kalamazoo, Michigan, becoming the Kalamazoo Kodiaks from 1996 to 1998, never reaching higher than last place in their division.

Before the 1999 season, the team moved again to London, Ontario and became the first Frontier League franchise located in Canada as the London Werewolves. They spent three seasons in Ontario (1999–2001), winning the Frontier League Championship in 1999, and making the playoffs in 2000. They played their home games at Labatt Memorial Park, believed to be the oldest operating baseball grounds in the world.

After a last place finish in 2001, the team moved again, this time to Canton, Ohio, as the Canton Coyotes. The team played at Thurman Munson Stadium. They would spend just one season in Canton, finishing fourth in their division before moving to Columbia, Missouri, for the 2003 season. The team folded after the 2005 season.

== Seasons ==
As Newark

1994: 26-35 4th Place Northern Division

1995: 39-29 2nd Place (No Divisions in 1995):

Lost 1st Round Playoff to Zanesville 2-0

As Kalamazoo

1996: 25-49 4th Place Western Division

1997: 33-47 4th Place Western Division

1998: 25-54 4th Place Western Division

As London

1999: 54-30 1st Place Eastern Division:

Won 1st Round Playoff 2-0 over Johnstown

Won Frontier League Championship 2-0 over Chillicothe

2000: 46-37 2nd Place Eastern Division:

Lost 1st Round Playoff 2-0 to Johnstown

2001: 37-47 5th Place Eastern Division

As Canton

2002: 41-43 4th Place Eastern Division ′′′Players: Chris Barbenetti, Trevor Bishop, Seth Brown, Matt Buckle, Chris Capozzi, Jeremy Durkee, Jeff Forbes, Wayne Foreman, Tim Friedman, Todd George, Matt Felts, Mark Haidet, Justin Hendrickson, Phil Kojak, Andy Larned, Ryan Lindburg, Heath McMurray, Lee Morrison, Criag Mosher, Gregg Neuman, Ben Orr, Ric Prussing,

As Mid-Missouri

2003: 33-57 6th Place Western Division

2004: 28-66 6th Place Western Division

2005: 31-63 6th Place Western Division
