= Sport in Ottawa =

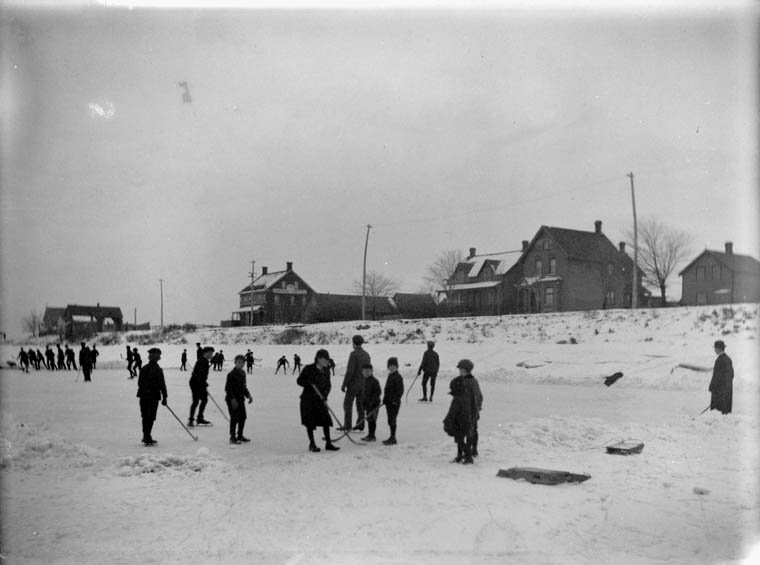
An ice hockey game on the Rideau Canal, Christmas Day 1901

Sport in Ottawa, Canada's capital, has a history dating back to the 19th century. Ottawa is home to seven professional sports teams: the Ottawa Senators of the National Hockey League; the Ottawa Redblacks of the Canadian Football League; the Ottawa Titans of the Frontier League; the Ottawa Blackjacks of the Canadian Elite Basketball League; Atlético Ottawa of the Canadian Premier League; Ottawa Charge of the Professional Women's Hockey League; Ottawa Rapid FC of the Northern Super League, and the Ottawa Black Bears of the National Lacrosse League. Several non-professional teams also play in Ottawa, including the Ottawa 67's junior hockey team and other semi-professional and collegiate teams in various sports.

== Sports teams in Ottawa ==
=== Professional and Major Junior teams ===
Ottawa has two teams that are part of the North American major professional league, including the Ottawa Senators (NHL), Ottawa RedBlacks (CFL).

Club	Sport	League	Venue	Established	Championships
Ottawa Senators (1992–present) and Ottawa Senators (original) (1883-1934)	Ice hockey	National Hockey League (1917–present) and Other Old Leagues (1883-1917)	Canadian Tire Centre (1996–present) Old Arenas (1883-1934)	1992 (Original, 1883)	11 (original team, 19 in total) (last in 1927)
Ottawa 67's	Ice hockey	Ontario Hockey League and Canadian Hockey League	TD Place Arena	1967	4 (2 Memorial Cup and 2 J. Ross Robertson Cup (last in 2001)
Gatineau Olympiques	Ice hockey	Quebec Maritimes Junior Hockey League and Canadian Hockey League	Centre Slush Puppie	1969	7 (1 Memorial Cup and 6 QMJHL Champions (last in 2008)
Ottawa Redblacks (2014–present), Ottawa Renegades (2002-2006), and Ottawa Rough Riders (1876-1996)	Canadian football	Canadian Football League	TD Place Stadium	2014	1 Grey Cup Ottawa Redblacks (last in 2016), 9 Grey Cup Ottawa Rough Riders (last in 1976)
Ottawa BlackJacks	Basketball	Canadian Elite Basketball League	TD Place Arena	2019	0
Atlético Ottawa	Soccer	Canadian Premier League	TD Place Stadium	2020	1 North Star Cup (last in 2025)
Ottawa Titans	Baseball	Frontier League	Ottawa Stadium	2020	1 (last in 2026)
Ottawa Charge	Ice hockey	Professional Women's Hockey League	Canadian Tire Centre	2023	0
Ottawa Rapid FC	Soccer	Northern Super League	TD Place Stadium	2024	0

=== Semi-professional and amateur teams ===
Club	Sport	League	Venue	Established	Championships
Ottawa Sooners	Canadian football	Canadian Junior Football League	TAAG Park	1960	4 Canadian Bowl (last in 1992)
Cumberland Panthers	Canadian football	Quebec Junior Football League	Millennium Sports Park	1993	0
Nepean Ravens	Ringette	National Ringette League	Nepean Sportsplex	2021	0
Ottawa Junior Riders	Canadian football	Quebec Junior Football League	Nepean Sportsplex	1995	9 Joe Pistilli Cup (last in 2019)
Ottawa Swans	Australian football	AFL Ontario	Rideau Carleton Raceway	2006	4 (Last in 2024)
Ottawa Lady Senators	Ice hockey	Ontario Women's Hockey League	Bell Sensplex	2008	2 (Last in 2009)

== Defunct and relocated teams ==
A number of professional and major semi-professional sports franchises have folded or relocated away from Ottawa over the years, spanning various North American leagues.

Team	Sport	League	Years active	Fate
Ottawa Senators	Ice hockey	National Hockey League	1917–1934	Relocated to St. Louis as the St. Louis Eagles
Ottawa Nationals	Ice hockey	World Hockey Association	1972–1973	Relocated to Toronto as the Toronto Toros
Ottawa Civics	Ice hockey	World Hockey Association	1976	Folded mid-season after 7 games (formerly Denver Spurs)
Ottawa Rough Riders	Canadian football	Canadian Football League	1876–1996	Ceased operations due to financial insolvency
Ottawa Renegades	Canadian football	Canadian Football League	2002–2006	Operations suspended by league; later folded
Ottawa Athletics	Baseball	International League	1952–1954	Relocated to Columbus, Ohio
Ottawa Lynx	Baseball	International League	1993–2007	Relocated to Allentown, Pennsylvania as the Lehigh Valley IronPigs
Ottawa Rapidz	Baseball	Can-Am League	2008	Declared bankruptcy and folded
Ottawa Champions	Baseball	Can-Am League	2014–2019	Dropped by league after stadium lease termination
Ottawa SkyHawks	Basketball	National Basketball League of Canada	2013–2014	Expelled from league due to financial issues
Ottawa Intrepid	Soccer	Canadian Soccer League	1987–1989	Folded (operated as Ottawa Pioneers in 1987)
Ottawa Rebel	Box lacrosse	National Lacrosse League	2001–2003	Operations suspended; later relocated as the Edmonton Rush
Ottawa Titans	Box lacrosse	National Lacrosse League	1990–1991	Proposed expansion team; folded before playing a game
Ottawa Black Bears	Quadball	Major League Quadball	2015-2025	Placed on "indefinite pause" due to lack of local quadball infrastructure.
Ottawa Black Bears	Box lacrosse	National Lacrosse League	2024–2026	Ceased operations following arena eviction and lease disputes

=== Post-secondary athletics ===
There are two public universities in Ottawa that presently operate a varsity program. They include the University of Ottawa (est. 1848 )and the Carleton University (est. 1942). The athletic programs of the two universities are a part of the Ontario University Athletics program, which itself is a member of U Sports.

Facilities used by university athletic programs based in Ottawa includes:

Varsity programs	Football Stadium	Seated Capacity	Basketball Arena	Seated Capacity	Hockey Arena	Seated Capacity	Soccer Stadium	Seated Capacity
Ottawa Gee-Gees	Gee-Gees Field	4,152	Montpetit Hall	1,000	Minto Sports Complex	850	Matt Anthony Field	1,500
Carleton Ravens	TAAG Park	3,500	Raven's Nest		Carleton Ice House	500	TAAG Park	3,500

== Sports ==
=== Ice hockey ===
Ice hockey began in Ottawa with the Stanley Cup in 1893. Teams from the city were dominant during the first quarter of the 20th century, with Ottawa teams winning 11 Cups from 1903 to 1927. The original Ottawa Senators were one of the original members of the National Hockey League, which was founded in 1917. The team folded in 1934 during the Great Depression, moving to St. Louis to become the St. Louis Eagles. The Senators returned to the National Hockey League in 1992. They currently play at the Canadian Tire Centre in Kanata.

In junior hockey, the city is represented by the Ottawa 67's of the Ontario Hockey League. The team began play in 1967, Canada's centennial year. Ottawa played host to the Memorial Cup tournament in 1972 and 1999. Ottawa also played host to the 2009 World Junior Ice Hockey Championships, and hosted the 2025 edition of the tournament as well. The city is home to three teams in the Central Canada Hockey League (Ottawa, Navan, Nepean), three teams in the Eastern Ontario Junior Hockey League (Ottawa, Ottawa West, Richmond) and three teams in the National Capital Junior Hockey League (Kanata, Metcalfe, Cumberland).

Ottawa was granted one of six charter franchises in the new Professional Women's Hockey League in 2023. The Ottawa Charge (then known as PWHL Ottawa) debuted on January 2, 2024, hosting Montreal at a sold-out TD Place Arena—the 8,318 fans in attendance set a new record for a women's professional hockey game.

Ottawa also has a minor hockey program, and plays host to the Bell Capital Cup each year.

=== Canadian football ===
The Ottawa Rough Riders were a Canadian Football League team that was founded in 1876 and would prove to be one of the oldest tenured sports franchises in North America. The team won nine Grey Cup championships over its long history but due to poor team play, poor attendance records and even worse management, the Rough Riders folded after the 1996 season, ending 120 years of professional football in Ottawa.

Five years later, a CFL expansion franchise was granted to the City of Ottawa. The team, called the Ottawa Renegades, began play in 2002, but folded in 2006 after just four seasons, due again to poor management. Less than two years later, in March 2008, a new franchise was awarded to the Ottawa Sports and Entertainment Group, led by Jeff Hunt, to begin play in 2010. The franchise was conditional upon reconstruction of Frank Clair Stadium, leading to a four-year delay for the team. The third iteration of professional football in Ottawa, the Ottawa Redblacks, began play in 2014, playing in the newly refurbished TD Place Stadium.

The University of Ottawa Gee-Gees football teams have won two Vanier Cups with their first in 1975 and then again in 2000. Carleton University also had a football team from 1945–1998, but the program was cancelled after the 1998 season. There have since been efforts to revive the program, with the football team being approved for Ontario University Athletics membership beginning in 2013. The rivalry between the two schools is heated, and the annual game between the two teams is known as the Panda Game.

The city also has two junior teams. The Ottawa Sooners play in the Canadian Junior Football League while the Ottawa Junior Riders play in the Quebec Junior Football League.

=== Baseball ===
Ottawa has had three International League franchises in its history. The Ottawa Giants (1951), the Ottawa Athletics (1952–1955) and most recently, the Ottawa Lynx (1993–2007). The Lynx were once very popular in the city, leading the league in attendance in its inaugural season, but attendance dropped and the team moved to the Lehigh Valley. The Lynx won the Governors' Cup in 1995.

Baseball was revived in Ottawa for the 2008 season, when the Ottawa Rapidz were founded in the independent Can-Am League. However, the team lasted just one season, as it folded, citing high rent for the stadium, despite respectable attendance.

Baseball returned to Ottawa from 2010 to 2012 with the addition of the Ottawa Fat Cats of the Intercounty Baseball League, but they folded before the 2013 IBL season.

The Ottawa Champions were founded in 2014 and began play in 2015. However, when the Can-Am League merged with the Frontier League in 2019, the Champions were left off the 2020 schedule. Ottawa joined the Frontier League again in the form of the Ottawa Titans who were founded in 2020 and began play in 2022 at Ottawa Stadium. The Ottawa Titans officially won the 2026 Frontier Cup on home field in front of 9009 fans. The team set and broke the league's attendance record twice (beating their old record from the home opener), which is now 10,303 fans. They set this record during game 3 of the Frontier League finals against the Evansville Otters, winning 8-6.

Ottawa is also home to the largest amateur baseball league in Canada – the National Capital Baseball League (www.nationalcapitalbaseball.com). The league is a wooden bat league with 37 teams in 4 tiers (as of 2012).

=== Basketball ===
Basketball in Ottawa began with the Ottawa SkyHawks, a professional basketball team that played in the National Basketball League of Canada in 2013. They later folded in 2014. The Ottawa Blackjacks of the Canadian Elite Basketball League were established in 2019 and began play in 2020. They were the first expansion team in the Canadian Elite Basketball League (CEBL).

Both Carleton University and the University of Ottawa sport varsity men's teams. The U Sports Men's Basketball Championship has been held in Ottawa from 2008 to 2010 and 2013 to 2014. The city plays host to the Capital Hoops Classic every January where both university teams play at Canadian Tire Centre. The first classic set a record for the highest attended university game in Canadian history.

=== Soccer ===
Soccer has been played in Ottawa for over 100 years. Ottawa is active with youth competitive, youth development, and adult recreational leagues. The most prominent team was the Ottawa Fury Women, a women's semi-professional team. The Ottawa Fury played in the semi-professional Premier Development League from 2005 to 2013, when the Ottawa Sports and Entertainment group launched a professional men's team in 2014, the Ottawa Fury FC, which played in the second-division United Soccer League (USL) until its dissolution in 2019. The Canadian Premier League announced in 2020 that Atlético Ottawa will be their 8th franchise in the league, owned by Spanish club Atlético Madrid. Atlético won their first Canadian Premier League title in the 2025 season as they beat Cavalry FC 2-1 in the final on November 9, 2025. Their home is at Lansdowne Park in a redeveloped TD Place Stadium. Ottawa's first women's professional soccer team, Ottawa Rapid FC of the Northern Super League, began play in 2025 as one of the league's founding clubs.

Ottawa was also represented at the semi-professional level when the Ottawa Wizards competed in the Canadian Professional Soccer League from 2001 to 2003. Their greatest success occurred in 2002 when they secured the league treble. Ottawa was represented a second time in the league when Capital City FC acquired a franchise in 2011. Capital City's run lasted only a season, where they finished as the runners-up in the playoff championship final.

=== Australian Rules Football ===
Australian Rules Football started in 2008 when the Ottawa Swans joined the Ontario Australian Football League (OAFL).

=== Curling ===
The city is home to 15 curling clubs, more than any other municipality in eastern Canada. The city has hosted four Briers and one Tournament of Hearts. The 2001 Nokia Brier was the most attended Brier ever in Eastern Canada at the time. Ottawa has sent four teams to the Brier to represent Ontario: Eldon Coombe (1972), Earle Morris (1985), Rich Moffatt (1999) and Bryan Cochrane (2003). Ottawa has also sent 15 teams to the Tournament of Hearts: Helen Hanright (1964), Dawn Ventura (1974 and 1976), Anne Merklinger (1993, 1994, 1998 and 2000) Jenn Hanna (2005 and 2016), Rachel Homan (2011, 2013, 2014, 2015, 2017 and 2019). Homan skipped the first Ottawa-based team to win a women's or a men's national championship when she led her Ottawa Curling Club team to a championship at the 2013 Scotties Tournament of Hearts. She won national titles again in 2014 and in 2017. Ottawa also hosted the 2017 Canadian Olympic Curling Trials which was won by Homan, who represented Canada the 2018 Winter Olympics.

Each year, Ottawa hosts one of the largest curling tournaments in the world, the OVCA Ottawa Men's Bonspiel (more commonly known as the "City of Ottawa bonspiel") which has been held since 1956. Ottawa is home to one of the oldest curling clubs in the world, the Ottawa Curling Club which was founded in 1851.

Curling in the Ottawa area is overseen by the Ottawa Valley Curling Association.

=== Gaelic football ===
Gaelic football has been present in the capital since the formation of the men's team, the Ottawa Gaels, in 1974 by Pat Kelly and Larry Bradley. The ladies team was formed in 1984 by Breda Kelly and has been dominant in the Toronto GAA (Gaelic Athletic Association) for the last decade. Minor players have played at the Continental Youth Championships in the USA.

=== Horse racing ===
Connaught Park Racetrack, located in Aylmer, Quebec operated from 1913 until its closure in 2008. It operated thoroughbred racing until the 1950s, and offered harness racing afterwards. In the early 1960s, Rideau Carleton Raceway was opened south of Ottawa, and it continues to operate a season of harness racing annually, along with off-track betting and gambling. Races have been held on the frozen Rideau Canal and the frozen Ottawa River. Canada has its own breed of horse, in 2002 the Canadian horse became national, it added to the list of «Heritage Livestock Canada».

=== Hurling ===
Since 2012, Ottawa has had an active amateur Hurling team made up of both local and Irish players. The team is called the Eire Og Ottawa Hurling Club. Games are played frequently against Montreal Shamrocks GAC. The team also competes in other larger tournaments administered by the Canadian GAA.

=== Ultimate frisbee ===
Ottawa has one of the world's largest ultimate frisbee communities dating back to the founding of the Ottawa-Carleton Ultimate Association in 1986. Ottawa has hosted the Canadian Ultimate Championships six times, most recently in 2017.

=== Rowing ===
The Ottawa Rowing Club was founded on 6 June 1867. One of its founders and first patron was Sir John A. Macdonald; other members of the first executive committee included Robert Lyon (politician), mayor of Ottawa, and; Allan Gilmour, businessman in the shipping and timber industries. The original club house was a wooden building, initially built on pontoons, and moored to the shore of the Ottawa river at the foot of parliament hill, between the Rideau canal and the Chaudière falls. Whilst the view from the club house over the Chaudière falls was picturesque, the rowing conditions were difficult: vast field of sawdust and other refuse from an immense lumber mill situated about the falls, and logs escaping from the booms. Each spring, along with the melting ice, the club house floated downstream and came aground. Every year it was brought back up near the Rideau canal. In the early 1870s, the ORC ceased to exist before being re-introduced on 25 June 1875 with approximately 100 members.

In 1884 and 1885, the club house suffered important damage when it sank. Members of the Ottawa Rowing Club, led by P. D. Ross, discussed building a permanent foundation for the club boat house in 1887. In spring 1896, the members of the Club decided to purchase a piece of the river front property at 10 Lady Grey Drive and leave the club house in its current, permanent location.

For six consecutive years, from 1905 to 1911, members of the club were the North American champions. The two world wars were difficult years for the club, with fourteen members of the club losing their lives while serving during World War I and with the shell house being neglected and showing signs of deterioration.

During the Depression years, P.D. Ross, former editor of the defunct Ottawa Journal, was president of the club. He infuriated his reporters by paying them small salaries while openly spending into equipment and upkeep for the rowing club.

In 1949, the Ottawa Rowing Club accepted to contribute to the development of the rowing program at the University of Ottawa by offering equipment and coaches. However, the 1950s and 1960s was a period of decline for the Ottawa Rowing Club. After seizing Club due to financial constraints, the City of Ottawa agreed to restore in 1967 the part of the old shell house that exists today but decided to demolish the other half of the building due to its poor condition (that portion of the building stored boats and included a ballroom). On that year, there were only nine members of the Club and the permanent closure of the club was being debated.

Volunteers, such as Peter King, supported the development of rowing in Ottawa in the 1970s. The rowing boom resulted in two new clubs (that do not exist anymore): the Nepean Rowing Club and the Ottawa Carleton Rowing School. With close to 1000 members, the Ottawa Rowing Club is one of the largest rowing club in Canada. It hosts three regatta per year.

== Events hosted ==
- 1903 Stanley Cup Challenge
- 1904 Stanley Cup Challenge
- 1905 Stanley Cup
- 1908 Stanley Cup Challenge
- 1909 Stanley Cup
- 1910 Stanley Cup Challenge
- 1911 Stanley Cup
- 1915 Stanley Cup Final
- 1920 Stanley Cup Final
- 1921 Stanley Cup Final
- 1922 Canadian Figure Skating Championships
- 1923 Stanley Cup Final
- 1925 Grey Cup
- 1927 Stanley Cup Final
- 1931 Memorial Cup
- 1939 Grey Cup
- 1940 Canadian Figure Skating Championships
- 1940 Grey Cup
- 1949 Canadian Figure Skating Championships
- 1953 Canadian Figure Skating Championships
- 1958 Canadian Figure Skating Championships
- 1958 Memorial Cup
- 1961 Diamond D Championship
- 1967 Grey Cup
- 1972 Memorial Cup
- 1976 Skate Canada International
- 1979 Macdonald Brier
- 1981 Skate Canada International
- 1987 Canadian Figure Skating Championships
- 1988 Grey Cup
- 1990 Scott Tournament of Hearts
- 1990 IIHF Women's World Championship
- 1993 Labatt Brier
- 1993 Skate Canada International
- 1996 Canadian Figure Skating Championships
- 1999 Canadian Figure Skating Championships
- 1999 Memorial Cup
- 2001 Nokia Brier
- 2001 Jeux de la Francophonie
- 2003 Canadian Junior Curling Championships
- 2004 Grey Cup
- 2005 NHL entry draft
- 2006 Canadian Figure Skating Championships
- 2006 Canadian Track and Field Championships
- 2007 Stanley Cup Final
- 2008 CIS Men's Basketball Championship
- 2008 NHL entry draft
- 2008 Skate Canada International
- 2009 World Junior Ice Hockey Championships
- 2009 CIS Men's Basketball Championship
- 2010 Canadian National Fencing Championships
- 2010 CIS Men's Basketball Championship
- 2012 NHL All-Star Game
- 2013 CIS Men's Basketball Championship
- 2013 IIHF Women's World Championship
- 2014 Canadian Figure Skating Championships
- 2014 CIS Men's Basketball Championship
- 2015 FIFA Women's World Cup
- 2016 Tim Hortons Brier
- 2017 Canadian Figure Skating Championships
- 2017 Canadian Track and Field Championships
- 2017 Canadian Olympic Curling Trials
- 2017 Grey Cup
- NHL 100 Classic
- 2018 Canadian Track and Field Championships
- 2020 U Sports Men's Basketball Championship
- 2020 U Sports Women's Basketball Championship
- 2022 Canadian Figure Skating Championships
- 2022 CEBL Championship
- 2022 Canadian Premier League final
- 2023 World Men's Curling Championship
- 2025 World Junior Ice Hockey Championships
- 2025 U Sports University Cup
- 2025 PWHL Finals
- 2025 Canadian Premier League final
- 2026 Walter Cup Finals
- 2026 Wheelchair Basketball World Championships
- 2026 Frontier League Finals

== Awards ==
Ottawa has a hall of fame honouring local athletes. There are also the "Ottawa Sports Awards" awarded annually to the top athletes in the city.

Ottawa Athlete of the Year
Year	Male	Female
2023	Jared Schmidt (ski cross)	Ivanie Blondin (speed skating)
2022	Tyrone Henry (para ice hockey)	Ivanie Blondin and Isabelle Weidemann (speed skating)
2021	Mason McTavish (ice hockey)	Ivanie Blondin and Isabelle Weidemann (speed skating)
2020	No winner	
2019	Tim Nedow (shot put)	Ivanie Blondin (speed skating)
2018	Michael Woods (cycling)	Isabelle Weidemann (speed skating)
2017	Vincent De Haitre (speed skating)	Rachel Homan (curling)
2016	Vincent De Haitre (speed skating / cycling)	Erica Wiebe (wrestling)
2015	Dustin Cook (alpine skiing)	Melissa Bishop (athletics)
2014	Vincent De Haitre (speed skating / cycling)	Ivanie Blondin (speed skating)
2013	Phillip Scrubb (basketball)	Rachel Homan (curling)
2012	Craig Savill (curling)	Courtnay Pilypaitis (basketball)
2011	Tyson Hinz (basketball)	Kate Goodfellow (rowing)
2010	Brad Sinopoli (Canadian football)	Kristina Groves (speed skating)
2009	Ian Mortimer (canoe/kayak)	Kristina Groves (speed skating)
2008	Angus Mortimer & Rhys Hill (canoe/kayak)	Kristina Groves (speed skating)
2007	Craig Savill (curling)	Kristina Groves (speed skating)
2006	Osvaldo Jeanty (basketball)	Kristina Groves (speed skating)
2005	Jeff Bean (freestyle skiing)	Elizabeth Urbach (rowing)
2004	Jason Dunkerley (Paralympic athletics)	Kristina Groves (speed skating)
2003	Corey Locke (ice hockey)	Melanie Banville (gymnastics)
2002	Jeff Bean (freestyle skiing)	
2001	Seamus Kotyk (ice hockey)	
2000	Phil Cote (Canadian football)	
1999	Brian Campbell (ice hockey)	
1998	John Morris (curling)	
1997	Alyn McCauley (ice hockey)	
1996	Glenroy Gilbert (Athletics)	
1995	Harry Van Hofwegen (Canadian football)	
1994	Linda Jackson & Gord Fraser (cycling)	
1993	Al Charron (rugby union)	
1992	Jeff Koradi (Canadian football)	
1991	Renn Crichlow (canoe/kayak)	
1990	Chris Flynn (Canadian football)	
1989	Chris Simboli (freestyle skiing)	
1988	Elizabeth Manley (figure skating)	
1987	Ian Millar (Equestrian)	
1986	Anna Fraser (freestyle skiing)	
1985	Caroll-Ann Alie (board sailing)	
1984	Linda Thom (shooting)	
1983	Kathy Bald (swimming)	
1982	Horst Bulau (ski jumping)	
1981	Horst Bulau (ski jumping)	
1980	Greg Olson (golf)	
1979	Pat Messner (water skiing)	
1978	Bobby Smith (ice hockey)	
1977	Doug Wilson (ice hockey)	
1976	Martin Wostenholme (tennis)	
1975	Neil Lumsden (Canadian football)	
1974	Lynn Nightingale (figure skating)	
1973	Sue Holloway (canoe/kayak)	
1972	Glenda Reiser (athletics)	
1971	Michel Larocque (ice hockey)	
1970	Linda Malcolm (shooting)	
1969	Betsy Clifford (alpine skiing)	
1968	Don Rioux (golf)	
1967	Pat Morris (ski jumping)	
1966	Tom Gorman (basketball)	
1965	Judy Dallimore (athletics)	
1964	Andre Nezan (golf)	
1963	Bob Stinson (golf)	
1962	Allan Salter (weightlifting)	
1961	Dave Dorman (athletics)	
1960	Anne Heggtveit (alpine skiing)	
1959	Barney Hartmann (shooting)	
1958	Anne Heggtveit (apline skiing)	
1957	Mariette Laframboise (tennis)	
1956	John Clifford (alpine skiing)	
1955	Art Tommy (alpine skiing)	
1954	Anne Heggtveit (alpine skiing)	
1953	Shirley Thomas (equestrian)	

== Past sports teams ==
Club	Sport	League	Venue	Established	Championships
Ottawa Rough Riders	Canadian football	Canadian Football League	Frank Clair Stadium	1876–1996	9 Grey Cups (last in 1976)
Ottawa Senators	Ice hockey	National Hockey League (and other leagues)	Ottawa Auditorium, The Arena, Dey's Arena, Rideau Rink	1884–1934	11 (Stanley Cups); 1 (Prince of Wales Trophy); 3 (Allan Cups)
Ottawa Senators/Braves	Baseball	Canadian–American League (Class C)	Lansdowne Park	1936–1940	0
Ottawa Nationals/Senators	Baseball	Border League (Class C)	Lansdowne Park	1947–1950	3
Ottawa Giants	Baseball	International League (AAA)	Lansdowne Park	1951	0
Ottawa Athletics	Baseball	International League (AAA)	Lansdowne Park	1952–1955	0
Ottawa-Hull Junior Canadiens	Ice hockey	(non-league)	Ottawa Auditorium	1956–1959	1 Memorial Cup (last in 1957)
Ottawa Lynx	Baseball	International League (AAA)	Lynx Stadium	1993–2007	1 (last in 1995)
Ottawa Loggers	Roller hockey	Roller Hockey International	Ottawa Civic Centre	1997–1999	0
Ottawa Raiders	Ice hockey	National Women's Hockey League	Sandy Hill Arena	1999–2007	0
Ottawa Harlequins	Rugby union	Rugby Canada Super League	Twin Elm Rugby Park	1999–2010	0
Ottawa Rebel	Indoor lacrosse	National Lacrosse League	Scotiabank Place	2001–2003	0
Ottawa Wizards	Soccer	Canadian Professional Soccer League	OZ Optics Stadium	2001–2003	1
Ottawa Renegades	Canadian football	Canadian Football League	Frank Clair Stadium	2002–2005	0
Ottawa Fury Women	Soccer	W-League	Keith Harris Stadium, Algonquin College Soccer Complex	2003–2014	1 (last in 2012)
Ottawa Fury (2005–13)	Soccer	Premier Development League	Keith Harris Stadium, Algonquin College Soccer Complex	2005–2013	0
Ottawa Rapidz	Baseball	Canadian American Association of Professional Baseball	Ottawa Baseball Stadium	2008–2009	0
Ottawa Fat Cats	Baseball	Intercounty Baseball League	Ottawa Baseball Stadium	2010–2012	0
Capital City FC	Soccer	Canadian Soccer League	Terry Fox Stadium	2011	0
Ottawa SkyHawks	Basketball	National Basketball League of Canada	Canadian Tire Center	2013-2014	0
Ottawa Fury FC	Soccer	North American Soccer League (and USL)	TD Place Stadium	2014–2019	0
Ottawa Champions	Baseball	Can-Am League	Raymond Chabot Grant Thornton Park	2014-2020	1 (last in 2016)
Ottawa Outlaws	Ultimate	American Ultimate Disc League	MNP Park	2014-2022	0
Ottawa Black Bears	Box lacrosse	National Lacrosse League	Canadian Tire Centre	2024-26	0
