= List of National Association of Professional Baseball rosters =

Below are the full rosters and coaching staff of the 18 teams of National Association of Professional Baseball.

== East Division ==
=== New Jersey Jackals ===
New Jersey Jackals roster
Active roster	Coaching staff
Pitchers: -- Dustin Baird; -- Branden Blankenship; -- Gabriel Cotto; -- Larry De Jesus; -- Sonny Fauci; -- Frankie Giuliano; -- Nick Hohenstein; -- Andrew Imperatore; -- Jake Kuchmaner; -- Konsta Kurikka; -- Will Lopez; -- David Tiburcio; -- Nick Trabacchi; -- Andrew Vail; -- Colt Webb; Catchers: -- Jimmy Costin; -- Justin Jimenez; -- Chris Reeder; -- Sebastian Velez; Infielders: -- Luis Acevedo; -- Richel Del Rosario; -- Chase Maifield; -- Jankel Ortiz; -- Jorge Ortiz; -- Trevor Sheehan; -- Xavier Vargas; Outfielders: -- Javell Barnes; -- Ryan Chase; -- Bryan Miranda; -- Matthew Smith	Manager: 21 Bobby Jones; Coaches: 12 Joe Testa (pitching); 10 J.P. Vail (hitting); Disabled list; ‡ Inactive list; § Suspended list; updated May 2, 2025 Transactions

=== New York Boulders ===
New York Boulders roster
Active (24-man) roster	Coaching staff
Pitchers: 13 Andrew Armstrong; 34 Alex Barker; 23 Emmett Bice; 35 Ethan Bradford; 3 Garrett Cooper; 38 Wesley Culley; 33 Connor Godwin; 27 Grady Gorgen; 25 Scott Harper; 28 Anthony Leak; 12 Jalon Long; 8 Garrett Peters; 20 Cobe Reeves; 1 Isaac Rohde; 16 Tyler Vail; Catchers: 29 Jason Agresti; 9 Jimmy Costin; Infielders: 15 Fritz Genther; 4 Kyle Hess; 30 Norris McClure; 22 Santino Rosso; Outfielders: 5 Julian Boyd; 26 John Schroeder; 21 Aaron Simmons; 31 Dan Tauken	Manager: -- T. J. Stanton; Coaches: -- Alfredo Marte (hitting); -- Mark Reardanz (pitching); -- Ryan Steeg (Assistant pitching); -- Anthony Corona (bench); Disabled list; ‡ Inactive list; § Suspended list; updated June 10, 2026 Transactions

=== Ottawa Titans ===
Team roster information is from the Ottawa Titans website.

Ottawa Titans roster
Active roster	Coaching staff
Pitchers: 38 Arturo Alvarez; -- Brendan Beard; -- Matthew Beattie; 20 Zach Cameron; 23 Dazon Cole; 29 Jake Dixon; -- Billy Duby; 34 Brett Garcia; 30 Shane Gray; 43 Evan Grills; -- Kaleb Hill; 51 Grant Larson; 40 Brandon Marklund; -- Tino Novis; -- Erasmo Pinales ‡; -- Shane Telfer; -- Koki Togashi; 9 Alfredo Villa; Catchers: 33 Victor Cerny; Infielders: 32 Kaiden Cardoso; 10 Aaron Casillas; 16 Michael Fuhrman; 14 Nolan Machibroda; 5 Jo Oyama; 28 Bradlee Preap; 1 Jackie Urbaez; 37 Felix Valerio; 7 AJ Wright; 26 Joey Wright; 12 Taylor Wright; 47 Cristian Inoa; Outfielders: 17 Lamar Briggs; 11 Canice Ejoh; 19 Jonah Sebring; 40 Ren Tachioka	Manager: 25 Bobby Brown; Coaches: 8 Tom Carcione (pitching); -- David Peterson (assistant); Disabled list; ‡ Inactive list; § Suspended list; updated 23 August 2025 Transactions

=== Québec Capitales ===
Québec Capitales roster
Active roster	Coaching staff
Pitchers: -- Braeden Allemann; -- Ty Buckner; 51 Gilberto Chu; -- Brodie Cooper-Vassalakis; -- Harold Cortijo; -- Garrett Crowley; -- Franklin Parra; -- Pablo Garabitos; 2 Harley Gollert; -- Ryusuke Ito; -- Cleiverth Perez; -- Kevin Rodriguez; -- Cole Roland; -- Masatoshi Sakurai; Catchers: -- Arturo De Freitas; 27 Anthony Quirion; Infielders: -- Jarrod Belbin; -- Emile Boies; 11 Kyle Crowl; -- Cristian Inoa; -- Kenen Irizarry; -- Will Riley; -- Joshwan Wright; -- Jesmuel Valentín; Outfielders: -- Pier-Olivier Boucher; 43 Justin Gideon; 23 Marc-Antoine Lebreux	Manager: 5 Patrick Scalabrini; Coaches: 40 Christian Chénard (pitching); 33 Lachlan Fontaine (hitting); Disabled list; ‡ Inactive list; § Suspended list; updated April 30, 2025 Transactions

=== Sussex County Miners ===
Sussex County Miners roster
Active (24-man) roster	Coaching staff
Pitchers: -- JC Ariza; -- Jackson Balzan; -- Chad Gartland; -- Robert Hensey Jr.; -- Dan Kiritsis; -- William Parsons; 39 Mike Reagan; -- Hunter Rossi; 12 Matt Stil; Catchers: -- Keenan O'Brien; Infielders: -- Mahki Backstrom; -- Sean Roby Jr.; -- Gionti Turner; Outfielders: -- Dominick Bucko; -- Dominic Johnson; -- Will Zimmerman	Manager: 26 Chris Widger; Coaches: 44 Gavin Stupienski (hitting); 5 Simon Walters (assistant); Disabled list; ‡ Inactive list; § Suspended list; updated April 25, 2025 Transactions

=== Trois-Rivières Aigles ===
Trois-Rivières Aigles roster
Active roster	Coaching staff
Pitchers: -- Alexander Castro; -- Nathan Draves; -- Ronaldo Fernandez; -- Mike Hansell; -- Halen Knoll; -- Cameron Kramer; 11 Nathan Landry; -- Charles Lefebvre; -- Jacob Peaden; -- Ethan Petric; -- Luis Manuel Rodriguez; 29 Harry Rutkowski; -- Jesen Therrien; -- Eric Waldichuk; -- Adam Wibert; Catchers: -- Chris Burgess; -- Cale Jones; -- Joshua Lopez; Infielders: -- Luis Curbelo; -- Brandon Hylton; -- AJ Karosas; -- Omar Meregildo; -- John Montes; -- Edward Sanchez; 16 James Smibert; Outfielders: -- Felix Chennier-Rondeau; -- Justin Farmer; -- Juan Carlos Negret; 30 LP Pelletier; -- Mathieu Vallee; -- David Vinsky; -- Tucker Zdunich	Manager: -- Jonathan Albaladejo; Coaches: -- Jerry Gonzalez (pitching); -- Eddy Gonzalez (assistant); Disabled list; ‡ Inactive list; § Suspended list; updated April 27, 2025 Transactions

=== Tri-City ValleyCats ===
Tri-City ValleyCats roster
Active roster	Coaching staff
Pitchers: 22 Wes Albert; -- Brayahns Barreto; -- Duke Brotherton; 29 Chas Cywin; 35 Nick DeCarlo; 21 Austin Dill; -- Hollis Fanning; -- Liu Fuenmayor; 6 Rolando Heredia-Bustos; 27 Easton Klein; -- Mikell Manzano ‡; 26 Arlo Marynczak; 18 Nathan Medrano ‡; -- Caden O'Brien; -- Tom Peltier; 32 Gino Sabatine; -- Stephen Still; -- Brenton Thiels; -- Luke Trueman; -- Paul Turelli; 17 Connor Wilford; Catchers: 12 Oscar Campos ‡; -- Miguel Useche; Infielders: -- Tyson Gingerich ‡; -- Brody Harding; -- Drew Holderbach; 1 Cam Jones; -- Amani Larry; 7 Josh Leslie; -- John McHenry; 16 Kyle Novak; -- Cedric Rose; -- Santino Rosso; -- Josue Urdaneta; 8 Ian Walters; -- Cooper Weiss; Outfielders: -- Julian Boyd; 11 Dylan Broderick; -- David Glancy; 1 Jaxon Hallmark ‡; 10 Demias Jimerson; -- Ethan Martini; -- Bobby Peirce; 20 Jake Reinisch; -- RJ Stinson; 3 Javeyan Williams	Manager: 37 Greg Tagert; Coaches: 30 Tom Thornton (pitching); Disabled list; ‡ Inactive list; § Suspended list; updated May 4, 2025 Transactions

== West Division ==
=== Evansville Otters ===
Evansville Otters roster
Active (24-man) roster	Coaching staff
Pitchers: -- CJ Backer; 18 Jon Beymer; 13 Parker Brahms; 27 Casey Delgado; -- Tyler Driver; -- Ben Gerl; -- Rolando Gutierrez; 46 Grif Hughes; 9 Chip Korbacher; -- Terance Marin; -- Adrian Montilva ‡; 36 Tyler Ras; 33 Braden Scott; 24 Zach Smith; 31 Alex Valdez; -- Zach Voelker; 50 Ryan Wiltse; -- Nate Wohlgemuth; Catchers: 8 Logan Brown ‡; 5 Justin Felix; -- Duncan Hewitt; -- Cohen Wilbanks; Infielders: -- George Callil; -- Alain Camou; 28 J.J. Cruz; -- Riley Delgado ‡; -- Ray Gil; 34 David Mendham; 11 Pavin Parks; -- Keenan Taylor; Outfielders: -- Graham Brown; -- Ty Crittenberger; 19 Clayton Keyes; 2 Mason White	Manager: -- Andy McCauley; Coaches: -- Phil Britton (assistant); -- Dylan Dando (assistant hitting); -- Billy Easley (assistant); -- Max Peterson (pitching); -- Bobby Segal (hitting); -- Rob Watson (assistant); Disabled list; ‡ Inactive list; § Suspended list; updated May 27, 2025 Transactions

=== Florence Y'alls ===
Florence Y'alls roster
Active roster	Coaching staff
Pitchers: -- Pedro Alfonseca; -- Dalton Barham; -- Michael Barker; -- Ethan Bell; -- Greg Blackman; -- Beau Blanchard; -- Jason Bollman; -- Shaun Gamelin; -- Carter Hines; -- Jett Lodes; 22 Blake Loubier; -- Conner Mackay; -- Eli Majick; -- Zane Robbins; 20 Jonaiker Villalobos; Catchers: -- Sean Lynch; -- Michael Quinones; Infielders: -- Brendan Bobo; -- Eddie Javier; Outfielders: -- Armani Smith; 13 Hank Zeisler	Manager: 99 Chad Rhoades; Coaches: 16 Karl Craigie (pitching); 23 Craig Massey (hitting); -- Jason Stowers (assistant); Disabled list; ‡ Inactive list; § Suspended list; updated May 4, 2025 Transactions

=== Gateway Grizzlies ===
Gateway Grizzlies roster
Active roster	Coaching staff
Pitchers: -- Donovan Burke; 21 Keegan Collett; 28 Teague Conrad; -- Sam Coonrod; 11 Tyler Cornett; 32 Alvery De Los Santos; -- Claudio Galva; 8 Matt Hickey; -- Francis Peguero; -- Sam Rochard; -- Zac Treece; 15 Gage Vailes; 14 Lukas Veinbergs; 23 Alec Whaley; Catchers: 9 Jose Alvarez; -- Tanner Garrison; -- Allante Hall; Infielders: -- Ross Friedrick; 2 Gabe Holt; 12 DJ Stewart; 18 Dale Thomas; -- Paxton Wallace; 10 Tate Wargo; Outfielders: 5 Cole Brannen; 20 Victor Castillo; -- Calyn Halvorson; 3 Edwin Mateo; -- Mark Shallenberger	Manager: 13 Steve Brook; Coaches: 38 Alex Ferguson (bench); 4 Kyle Gaedele (hitting); 17 Nick Kennedy (pitching); Disabled list; ‡ Inactive list; § Suspended list; updated May 4, 2025 Transactions

=== Joliet Slammers ===
Joliet Slammers roster
Active roster	Coaching staff
Pitchers: -- CJ Blowers; -- Chase Hopewell; -- Gunnar Kines; -- Kyle Klingenbeck; -- Aidan McEvoy; -- Tony Oreb; -- Bryan Peña; -- Jordan Powell; -- Alex Vera; 19 Zac Westcott; -- Kyle White; Catchers: -- Craig Corliss; Infielders: -- Ian Battipaglia; -- Braylin Marine; -- John McGuire; -- Jamey Smart; -- Paul Toetz; -- Zach Weaver; -- Danny Wuestenfeld; Outfielders: -- Blake Berry; -- Nick Iannantone; 28 Liam McArthur	Manager: 3 Mike Pinto; Coaches: 5 Ron Biga (bench); -- Tyler Martin (pitching); Disabled list; ‡ Inactive list; § Suspended list; updated April 28, 2025 Transactions

=== Lake Erie Crushers ===
Lake Erie Crushers roster
Active (24-man) roster	Coaching staff
Pitchers: -- Michael Brewer; -- Cal Carver; -- Jack Eisenbarger; -- Anthony Escobar; -- Steven Ordorica; -- Kenny Pierson; -- Miguel Pozo; -- Darrien Ragins; -- Leonardo Rodriguez; -- Ethan Smith; -- Dylan Spain; -- Michael Spinozzi; -- Sammy Tavarez; -- Juan Zapata; Catchers: -- Alfredo González; Infielders: -- Vincent Byrd Jr.; -- Zack Campbell; -- Alberti Chavez; -- Scout Knotts; -- Davie Morgan; -- Logan Thomason; -- Jarrod Watkins; Outfielders: -- Jacob Corson; -- Burle Dixon; 7 Sam Franco; -- Jordan Harrison-Dudley; -- Matty Warren	Manager: -- Jared Lemieux; Coaches: -- Jerry Gonzalez (hitting); Disabled list; ‡ Inactive list; § Suspended list; updated May 4, 2025 Transactions

=== Schaumburg Boomers ===
Schaumburg Boomers roster
Active roster	Coaching staff
Pitchers: 17 Cole Cook; 31 Antonio Frias; 33 Aaron Glickstein; 19 Ross Thompson; 22 Quinlan Wiley; 6 Nick Paciorek; 28 Hambleton Oliver; 4 Kai Taylor; 16 Deretd Parra; 26 Isaiah Rivera; 34 Derek Salata; 8 Kobey Schlotman; 18 Christian Johnson; 12 Dylan Stutsman; 14 Mitch White; 21 Eric Turner; Catchers: 15 John Fiorenza; 30 Sam Kuchinski; Infielders: 36 Anthony Calarco; 7 Alec Craig; 3 Christian Fedko; 5 Kyle Fitzgerald; 2 Alec Gonzalez; 10 Will Prater; Outfielders: 23 Michael Gould; 11 Aaron Simmons; 9 Andrew Sojka; 31 Bren Spillane; 13 Banks Tolley	Manager: -- Jamie Bennett; Coaches: -- Bill Fratto (assistant/first base); -- Nick Oddo (hitting); -- Jason Stowers (pitching); Disabled list; ‡ Inactive list; § Suspended list; updated July 20, 2025 Transactions

=== Washington Wild Things ===
Washington Wild Things roster
Active roster	Coaching staff
Pitchers: -- Jacob Carroll; -- Ryan Chasse; -- Albert Cuello-Batista; -- Joelvis Del Rosario; -- Jordan DiValerio; -- Brent Francisco; -- Santiago Florez; -- Hector Garcia; -- Regi Grace; -- Jackson Hicks; 21 Zach Kirby; -- Jacob McCaskey; -- Nick McClanahan; -- Ivan Oviedo; -- Marlon Perez; -- Tyler Wehrle; Catchers: -- Willie Estrada; -- Jommer Hernandez; Infielders: -- Tommy Caufield; -- Andrew Czech; -- Sammy Infante; -- Tyreque Reed; -- Ethan Wilder; Outfielders: -- Jake DeLeo; -- Wagner Lagrange; -- Jeff Liquori; -- Caleb McNeely; -- Brett Roberts	Manager: 7 Tom Vaeth; Coaches: -- Cole Bumbales (first base); -- Hector Nelo (pitching); Disabled list; ‡ Inactive list; § Suspended list; updated May 4, 2025 Transactions

=== Windy City ThunderBolts ===
Windy City ThunderBolts roster
Active roster	Coaching staff
Pitchers: 22 Dan Brown; -- Maceo Campbell; -- Greg Duncan; -- Aaron Evers; -- Jordan Goldmann; 8 Bryce Hellgeth; -- Heath Mann; 24 Jacob Newman; 42 Kevin Pindel; -- Trevin Reynolds; -- Caleb Riedel; -- Jeff Rotz; -- Dylan Savino; -- Noah Stants; -- Bobby Vath; Catchers: -- Zach Beadle; 6 JJ Figueroa; 31 Kyle Harbison; -- Tyler Hill; Infielders: 12 Garrett Broussard; -- Jose Curpa; -- Winder Diaz; -- Jalen Greer; 14 Christian Kuzemka; -- David Maberry; 18 Emmanuel Sanchez; -- Donivan Williams; Outfielders: -- Ashton Creal; -- Ronny Dominguez; -- Kendal Ewell; -- Dakota Kotowski; 4 Cam Phelts; -- Michael Sandle; -- Oscar Serratos	Manager: -- Toby Hall (interim); Coaches: -- Kevin Santiago (hitting); Disabled list; ‡ Inactive list; § Suspended list; updated May 4, 2025 Transactions
