= Mitch Lively =

American baseball player (born 1985)

- Pitcher
- Born: September 7, 1985 (age 41); Susanville, California, U.S.
- Bats: Right Throws: Right

Professional debut
- NPB: June 26, 2015, for the Hokkaido Nippon Ham Fighters
- CPBL: March 28, 2018, for the Chinatrust Brothers

NPB statistics (through 2015 season)
- Win–loss record: 0–0
- Earned run average: 5.30
- Strikeouts: 22

CPBL statistics (through 2021 season)
- Win–loss record: 24–25
- Earned run average: 4.09
- Strikeouts: 310
- Stats at Baseball Reference

Teams
- Hokkaido Nippon-Ham Fighters (2015); Chinatrust / CTBC Brothers (2018–2021)

Mitchell David Lively (born September 7, 1985) is an American former professional baseball pitcher. He has previously played in Nippon Professional Baseball (NPB) for the Hokkaido Nippon-Ham Fighters and in the Chinese Professional Baseball League (CPBL) for the CTBC Brothers.

== Early career ==
Lively was born in Susanville, California and attended Lassen High School. Lively attended California State University Sacramento, where he played baseball and football, where he was the punter. He averaged 40.83 yards per punt, the second-best career average in school history among punters with at least 50 attempts. In baseball, Lively had a 4.95 ERA in 14 games in 2004 and, after not playing in 2005, was 0–6 with a 7.42 ERA in 2006. During his final college season, 2007, he was 1–3 with eight saves and an 8.07 ERA. He led the Western Athletic Conference in saves.

== Professional career ==
=== Colorado Rockies ===
Despite his lackluster numbers, the Colorado Rockies drafted him in the 16th round of the 2007 Major League Baseball draft, two picks ahead of pitcher Steve Edlefsen. He was signed by scout Gary Wilson. He was 1–0 with two runs (one earned) in 6 2/3 innings pitched for the Casper Rockies that year and was released following the season.

=== San Francisco Giants ===
Lively signed with the independent San Angelo Colts of the United Baseball League for 2008, pitching 11 games and earning four saves, posting a 2.13 ERA and striking out 18 batters in 12 2/3 innings before signing a contract with the San Francisco Giants partway through the year. To finish the year, he pitched for the Arizona League Giants, allowing no runs in 2 2/3 innings, and Augusta Greenjackets, going 1–0 with a 1.42 ERA in 10 games. Overall, Lively had a 1.61 mark in 23 games. 2009 was split between Augusta, with whom he allowed 9 runs in 17 2/3 frames, the San Jose Giants (5.23 ERA in 16 games) and the Connecticut Defenders, with whom he had a 0.70 ERA in 14 games. Overall, Lively had a 3.23 mark in 43 games. He spent 2010 with Augusta (going 4–2 with a save and a 4.89 ERA in 24 games) and the Richmond Flying Squirrels (going 2–4 with three saves and a 3.90 ERA in 23 games). Lively had a 4.41 ERA in 47 games overall. In 2011, he had a 2.14 ERA with nine saves in 56 appearances between San Jose and Richmond and in 2012, his first year with the Triple-A Fresno Grizzlies, Lively was 8–4 with a 2.99 ERA in 47 relief appearances. He converted to starting pitching for 2013, going 7–5 with a 4.72 ERA in 30 games (20 starts) for Fresno. With the Navegantes del Magallanes during the Venezuelan Winter League, he went 6–1 with a 1.46 ERA and won Pitcher of the Year.

In late 2013, Lively adopted a windmill windup—rare in modern baseball, but reminiscent of players like Satchel Paige and Bob Feller—which he used through 2014. He began the 2014 campaign in the Giants system, but after posting a 5.08 ERA in 22 games (15 starts) for Fresno, he was released.

=== Washington Nationals ===
On July 17, 2014, Lively signed a minor league contract with the Washington Nationals, and was assigned to the Triple–A Syracuse Chiefs. He was 5–2 with a 3.86 ERA in 9 games (7 starts) for them and 11–6 with a 4.72 ERA in 31 games overall. He also averaged 8.2 strikeouts per nine innings. After being granted free agency in November, the Nationals re-signed him to a minor league contract on December 16. Lively was released by the Nationals organization on June 17, 2015.

=== Hokkaido Nippon Ham Fighters ===
Following his release from the Nationals, Lively went to play for the Hokkaido Nippon Ham Fighters of Nippon Professional Baseball for the remainder of the 2015 campaign. He made 16 appearances for the Fighters (all in relief), pitched 18 2/3 innings, didn't have a decision, had an ERA of 5.30, struck out 22.

=== Vaqueros Laguna ===
On April 1, 2016, Lively signed with the Vaqueros Laguna of the Mexican League. In 12 appearances, he recorded a 3.00 ERA with 11 strikeouts across 12 innings of work. Lively was released by Laguna on April 28.

=== Broncos de Reynosa ===
On May 2, 2016, Lively signed with the Broncos de Reynosa of the Mexican Baseball League. In 32 appearances out of the bullpen for the Broncos, Lively logged a 1.72 ERA with 40 strikeouts and 8 saves across 36 2/3 innings pitched.

=== Washington Nationals (second stint) ===
On August 18, 2016, Lively signed a minor league contract to return to the Washington Nationals organization. In 6 appearances for the Double–A Harrisburg Senators, he recorded a 5.79 ERA with 6 strikeouts and 1 save over 4 2/3 innings of work. Lively elected free agency following the season on November 7.

=== Bravos de León ===
On March 7, 2017, Lively announced that he would return to the Mexican League with the Bravos de León. He had a record of 7–2, and led the team in ERA (2.41). He tied for the team lead with 60 strikeouts, despite missing part of the season with an injury. He became a fan favourite in León, and acquired the nickname "The Boss".

Lively remained in Mexico to play for the Venados de Mazatlán of the Mexican Pacific League for the 2017–2018 season. He had a 9–2 record, and the nine wins led the league. He had eight straight wins at one point in the season. His 2.50 ERA was second-lowest in the league, and his 63 strikeouts were second-best in the league. Lively was subsequently named Pitcher of the Year by the Mexican Pacific League.

=== Chinatrust / CTBC Brothers ===
On February 9, 2018, Lively signed with the Chinatrust Brothers of Taiwan's Chinese Professional Baseball League. His record was 7–8, 4.05 ERA, and 119 strikeouts. Following the conclusion of the 2018 CPBL season, Lively returned to Mexico to pitch for the Venados de Mazatlán of the Mexican Pacific League for the 2018-19 winter season. He had a record of 3–1, 0.77 ERA, 44 strikeouts in 47 innings pitched.

On December 22, 2018, Lively re-signed with the Brothers for the 2019 season. In 2019, he posted a 10–11 record with a 3.23 ERA and 140 strikeouts over 167 innings. Lively re-signed with the team, now named the CTBC Brothers, on January 7, 2020. Lively pitched to a 6–1 record with a 3.94 ERA and 36 strikeouts before a shoulder injury ended his season prematurely in July. Lively again re-signed with the club for the 2021 season. However, he struggled to an 8.35 ERA and 1.88 WHIP over 36 innings, and was released by the team on July 22, 2021, when Evan Grills was signed.

=== Bravos de León (second stint) ===
On December 18, 2021, Lively signed with the Bravos de León of the Mexican League. In 8 starts, Lively posted a 2–1 record with a 8.42 ERA and 14 strikeouts over 36 1/3 innings. He was waived by León on June 17, 2022.

=== Diablos Rojos del México ===
On June 28, 2022, Lively signed with the Diablos Rojos del México of the Mexican League. In 3 starts, Lively registered a 2–1 record with a 10.64 ERA and 13 strikeouts over 11 innings. He was released by México on July 14.

=== El Águila de Veracruz ===
On August 1, 2022, Lively signed with El Águila de Veracruz of the Mexican League. In 2 starts for Veracruz, he allowed 5 runs on 12 hits with 6 strikeouts over 10 innings. Lively was released by the club on January 19, 2023.
