= Shirley Thomas =

Shirley Thomas may refer to:

- Shirley Thomas (USC professor) (1920–2005), an American radio/television actress/writer/producer, advocate for United States Space Program & professor of technical writing
- Shirley Thomas (athlete) (born 1963), a British women's track runner
- Shirley Thomas (equestrian), see Sport in Ottawa

== See also ==
- Thomas Shirley (disambiguation)
