= 2026 Frontier League season =

33rd annual season of the Frontier League

- League: Frontier League
- Sport: Baseball
- Duration: May 7 – September 6 (Playoffs: September 9 – September 26)
- Games: 102
- Teams: 18

East Division
- League champions: Québec Capitales

West Division
- League champions: Washington Wild Things

Frontier League Championship
- Champions: Ottawa Titans
- Runners-up: Evansville Otters
- Finals MVP: Ky Hampton, Ottawa Titans

Seasons
- ← 2025 2027 →

The 2026 Frontier League season was the 33rd season of operation (32nd season of play) of the Frontier League (FL). The regular season began on May 7, 2026, and ended on September 6. The playoffs concluded on September 26, with the Ottawa Titans winning their first league championship in franchise history, defeating the Evansville Otters in four games, on the city's 200th birthday. Game 3 of the finals set an MLB partner playoff attendance record and a league record with a sellout 10,303 spectators in the park.

== Season changes ==
In this season, each club plays a 102-game regular-season schedule instead of the 96-game schedule.

Also, in April 2026, the league announced that it would rebrand as the National Association of Professional Baseball (NAPB) beginning with the 2027 season. The league stated that its history, statistics, records and team histories would continue under the new identity.

== Regular season standings ==
- y – Clinched division
- x – Clinched playoff spot
- e – Eliminated from playoff contention

=== North Division ===
Team	W	L	Pct.	GB
y - Québec Capitales	69	32	.683	–
x - Ottawa Titans	57	44	.564	12
e - Brockton Rox	40	61	.396	29
e - Tri-City Valley Cats	39	61	.390	29.5
e - Trois-Rivières Aigles	38	64	.373	31.5

=== East Division ===
Team	W	L	Pct.	GB
y - New Jersey Jackals	56	46	.549	13.5
x - New York Boulders	55	46	.545	14
e - Sussex County Miners	48	54	.471	21.5
e - Down East Bird Dawgs	48	54	.471	21.5

=== Central Division ===
Team	W	L	Pct.	GB
y - Washington Wild Things	66	35	.653	3
x - Evansville Otters	62	40	.608	7.5
x - Florence Y'alls	55	47	.539	14.5
e - Lake Erie Crushers	42	59	.416	27

=== West Division ===
Team	W	L	Pct.	GB
y - Schaumburg Boomers	57	45	.559	12.5
e - Windy City Thunderbolts	55	47	.539	14.5
e - Gateway Grizzlies	44	57	.436	25
e - Joliet Slammers	42	60	.412	27.5
e - Mississippi Mud Monsters	40	61	.396	29

== Playoffs ==
=== Format ===
The teams with the highest winning percentage (when calculated to three decimal places) in each respective division at the end of the season will qualify for the playoffs and receive the top two seeds in their conference, regardless of final record. The next two best records in each conference as determined by winning percentage (calculated to three (3) decimal places) will also qualify for the playoffs as wild card teams.

=== Playoff results ===
==== Wild Card Round ====
===== Quebec vs. New York =====
New York won the series, 2-1.

Game	Date	Score	Location	Time	Attendance
1	September 9	Quebec Capitales 3, New York Boulders 0	Clover Stadium	2:27	-
2	September 11	New York Boulders 6, Quebec Capitales 3	Stade Canac	3:07	4,297
3	September 12	New York Boulders 16, Quebec Capitales 8	Stade Canac	3:11	4,297

===== Ottawa vs. New Jersey =====
Ottawa won the series, 2-0.

Game	Date	Score	Location	Time	Attendance
1	September 10	New Jersey Jackals 2, Ottawa Titans 4	Ottawa Stadium	2:55	4,812
2	September 12	Ottawa Titans 6, New Jersey Jackals 0	Hinchliffe Stadium	2:55	904

===== Florence vs. Washington =====
Washington won the series, 2-1.

Game	Date	Score	Location	Time	Attendance
1	September 9	Washington Wild Things 8, Florence Y’alls 3	Thomas More Stadium	2:58	1,848
2	September 11	Florence Y’alls 6, Washington Wild Things 5	EQT Park	2:58	3,214
3	September 13	Florence Y’alls 8, Washington Wild Things 9	Thomas More Stadium	3:31	1,038

===== Schaumburg vs. Evansville =====
Evansville won the series, 2-1.

Game	Date	Score	Location	Time	Attendance
1	September 9	Schaumburg Boomers 3, Evansville Otters 2	Bosse Field	2:26	1,274
2	September 11	Evansville Otters 4, Schaumburg Boomers 1	Wintrust Field	2:58	4,442
3	September 12	Evansville Otters 3, Schaumburg Boomers 2	Wintrust Field	2:52	2,483

==== Conference Finals ====
===== Washington vs. Evansville =====
Evansville won the series, 3-2.

Game	Date	Score	Location	Time	Attendance
1	September 15	Washington Wild Things 13, Evansville Otters 14	Bosse Field	4:12	1,129
2	September 16	Washington Wild Things 3, Evansville Otters 12	Bosse Field	3:06	1,128
3	September 18	Evansville Otters 1, Washington Wild Things 4	EQT Park	2:45	1,936
4	September 19	Evansville Otters 3, Washington Wild Things 9	EQT Park	2:52	1,640
5	September 20	Evansville Otters 9, Washington Wild Things 6	EQT Park	3:16	1,542

===== Ottawa vs. New York =====
Ottawa won the series, 3-0.

Game	Date	Score	Location	Time	Attendance
1	September 15	Ottawa Titans 6, New York Boulders 0	Clover Stadium	2:41	688
2	September 16	Ottawa Titans 6, New York Boulders 3	Clover Stadium	2:40	745
3	September 18	New York Boulders 2, Ottawa Titans 3	Ottawa Stadium	2:40	7,912

==== Championship Finals ====
===== Ottawa vs. Evansville =====
Ottawa won the series, 3-1.

Game	Date	Score	Location	Time	Attendance
1	September 22	Ottawa Titans 0, Evansville Otters 6	Bosse Field	2:30	1,814
2	September 23	Ottawa Titans 11, Evansville Otters 1	Bosse Field	2:58	2,783
3	September 23	Evansville Otters 6, Ottawa Titans 8	Ottawa Stadium	3:05	10,303
4	September 26	Evansville Otters 0, Ottawa Titans 4	Ottawa Stadium	2:10	9,009

== End of year awards ==
Award	Player	Team
Most Valuable Player	Andrew Czech	Washington Wild Things
Pitcher of the Year	Kobe Foster	Washington Wild Things
Rookie of the Year	Brett Blomquist	Florence Y'alls
Manager of the Year	Tom Carcione	Windy City Thunderbolts
Executive of the Year	Max Johnson	Florence Y'alls
