= 1998 Eastern League season =

The 1998 Eastern League season began on approximately April 1 and the regular season ended on approximately September 1.

The Harrisburg Senators defeated the New Britain Rock Cats 3 games to 1 to win the Eastern League Championship Series.

== Regular season ==
=== Standings ===
Eastern League - Northern Division
Team	Win	Loss	%	GB
**New Britain Rock Cats**	83	59	.585	–
Binghamton Mets	82	60	.577	1.0
Portland Sea Dogs	66	75	.468	16.5
Norwich Navigators	66	76	.465	17.0
New Haven Ravens	59	83	.415	24.0

Eastern League - Southern Division
Team	Win	Loss	%	GB
Akron Aeros	81	60	.574	–
**Harrisburg Senators**	73	69	.514	8.5
Trenton Thunder	71	70	.504	10.0
Bowie Baysox	71	71	.500	10.5
Reading Phillies	56	85	.397	25.0

Notes:

Green shade indicates that team advanced to the playoffs
Bold indicates that team advanced to ELCS
Italics indicates that team won ELCS

=== Statistical league leaders ===
==== Batting leaders ====
Stat	Player	Total
AVG	Doug Mientkiewicz (New Britain Rock Cats)	.323
HR	Calvin Pickering (Bowie Baysox)	31
RBI	Calvin Pickering (Bowie Baysox)	114
R	Doug Mientkiewicz (New Britain Rock Cats)	96

==== Pitching leaders ====
Stat	Player	Total
W	Mike Lincoln (New Britain Rock Cats)	15
ERA	Mike Kusiewicz (New Haven Ravens)	2.32
SO	Brent Billingsley (Portland Sea Dogs)	183
SV	Brent Stentz (New Britain Rock Cats)	43

== Playoffs ==
=== Divisional Series ===
==== Northern Division ====
The New Britain Rock Cats defeated the Binghamton Mets in the Northern Division playoffs 3 games to 1.

==== Southern Division ====
The Harrisburg Senators defeated the Akron Aeros in the Southern Division playoffs 3 games to 1.

=== Championship Series ===
The Harrisburg Senators defeated the New Britain Rock Cats in the ELCS 3 games to 1.
