= 2013 CIS Men's Basketball Championship =

Canadian university basketball championship

The 2013 CIS Men's Final 8 Basketball Tournament was held March 8–10, 2013 in Ottawa, Ontario. It was the first of two consecutive CIS Championships to be held at Scotiabank Place (renamed July 2013 as Canadian Tire Centre) after the tournament was held in Halifax in 2011 and 2012. This was the fourth time Carleton University has hosted the tournament, with the most recent being in 2009. Carleton was joined by six other qualifiers and one wild card team. The Carleton Ravens won their ninth title in eleven years. In the process they set a new record for the most CIS Men's basketball championships.

== List of participating teams ==
Seed	Team	Qualified
1	Carleton Ravens	Host (Ontario University Champion)
2	Cape Breton Capers	Atlantic University Champion
3	Ottawa Gee-Gees	Ontario University Finalist
4	UBC Thunderbirds	Canada West Champion
5	Acadia Axemen	Wildcard
6	McGill Redmen	Quebec University Champion
7	Lakehead Thunderwolves	Ontario University 3rd place
8	Victoria Vikes	Canada West Finalist

== Championship Bracket ==
First Round: March 8
1	Carleton Ravens (28-1)	83
8	Victoria Vikes (21-10)	46
4	UBC Thunderbirds (28-5)	80
5	Acadia Axemen (21-7)	89
2	Cape Breton Capers (26-3)	61
7	Lakehead Thunderwolves (26-11)	74
3	Ottawa Gee-Gees (22-10)	82
6	McGill Redmen (21-7)	70

Semi-Finals: March 9
1	Carleton Ravens (29-1)	84
5	Acadia Axemen (22-7)	69
3	Ottawa Gee-Gees (23-10)	62
7	Lakehead Thunderwolves (27-11)	66

Final: March 10
1	Carleton Ravens (30-1)	92
7	Lakehead Thunderwolves (28-11)	42
Bronze Medal Game: March 10
3	Ottawa Gee-Gees	92 (OT)
5	Acadia Axemen	85

== Consolation Bracket ==
Consolation Semi-Finals: March 9
4	UBC Thunderbirds	65
8	Victoria Vikes	71
2	Cape Breton Capers	84
6	McGill Redmen	86 (OT)

Consolation Final: March 10
6	McGill Redmen	80
8	Victoria Vikes	68

Note: All records are against CIS competition only.
