= CJFO-FM =

Francophone community radio station in Ottawa

Coordinates: 45.4315°N 75.6584°W

- Ottawa, Ontario; Canada
- Broadcast area: National Capital Region
- Frequency: 94.5 MHz
- Branding: 94,5 Unique FM

Programming
- Language: French
- Format: Community radio
- Affiliations: Ottawa Titans

Ownership
- Owner: Radio de la communauté francophone d'Ottawa

History
- First air date: November 15, 2010
- Call sign meaning: Franco-Ontarian

Technical information
- Licensing authority: CRTC
- Class: B1
- ERP: 2,000 watts
- HAAT: 262.4 metres (861 ft)

Links
- Webcast: Listen live
- Website: uniquefm.ca

CJFO-FM (branded as 94,5 Unique FM) is a radio station which broadcasts a francophone community radio format on the frequency 94.5 FM/MHz in Ottawa, Ontario, Canada.

Owned by Radio de la communauté francophone d'Ottawa (RCFO), the station received CRTC approval on February 4, 2010.

The station officially launched at 6 a.m. on November 15, 2010 after a testing period that began in September 2010.

While the Ottawa-Gatineau market is served by several francophone stations, CJFO is the first station in the market targeted specifically to the Franco-Ontarian audience in Ottawa and Eastern Ontario. The commercial francophone outlets are licensed to Gatineau and primarily target listeners on the Quebec side of the Ottawa River. The Radio-Canada outlets focus on not only the National Capital Region, but Canada as a whole.

The station is the francophone radio broadcast partner for the Ottawa Senators and the Ottawa Titans.

CJFO's studios are located in Vanier, while its transmitter is located in Camp Fortune, Quebec.

The station is a member of the Alliance des radios communautaires du Canada.

== History ==
On August 26, 2008, RCFO's first attempt to obtain a license was denied by the CRTC. The initial application would have had the station broadcast at 101.7 MHz, with an average effective radiated power of 718 watts.

On November 21, 2008, federal Minister of Canadian Heritage and Official Languages James Moore issued a statement calling on the CRTC to review its prior approval of two new stations in the Ottawa area, Astral Media's CJOT-FM and Frank Torres' CIDG-FM. Moore asked the commission to assess whether the francophone population of the Ottawa-Gatineau area was sufficiently well-served by existing French radio services, and to consider licensing one or more of the French language applications — which included a Christian music station, a community radio station and a campus radio station for the Université du Québec en Outaouais — in addition to or instead of the approved stations.

In the resulting round of hearings, Torres proposed that a new francophone station could be licensed on 94.5 FM, although such a station would be second-adjacent to Astral's CIMF-FM. Industry Canada subsequently aired a testing signal on 94.5 in May 2009 to determine whether the signal could be used without impacting CIMF. The test found that the signal could be used without causing significant interference to CIMF, and Astral consequently gave its consent to the use of the frequency as long as the company retained authorization to launch CJOT.
