= Thomas Shirley (disambiguation) =

Thomas Shirley (1564–c. 1634) was an English soldier, adventurer and politician.

Thomas Shirley may also refer to:

- Thomas Shirley (died 1544), MP for Steyning
- Thomas Shirley (died 1612) (c. 1542–1612), English knight
- Sir Thomas Shirley, 1st Baronet (1727–1800), colonial head of the Bahamas, Governor of the Leeward Islands
- Thomas Shirley (Royal Navy officer) (1733–1814), leader of Shirley's Gold Coast expedition
- Thomas Shirley (RAF officer) (1908–1982), British air marshal

== See also ==
- Thomas Sherley (1638–1678), English physician
- Shirley Thomas (disambiguation)
