= Ottawa Titans =

Frontier League baseball team in Ontario

Logo	Cap insignia

Information
- League: National Association of Professional Baseball (North Division)
- Location: Ottawa, Ontario
- Ballpark: Ottawa Stadium
- Founded: 2020; 6 years ago
- League championships: 1 2026
- Division championships: 0
- Playoff berths: 3 2022 2024 2026
- Colours: Red, black, white, gray
- Mascot: Cappy
- Ownership: Sam Katz, OSEG, Jacques J.M. Shore
- President: Regan Katz
- General manager: Martin Boyce
- Manager: Bobby Brown
- Media: Ottawa Citizen; Ottawa Sun; CityNews Ottawa; Le Droit; Radio-Canada; TSN 1200; TVA Sports; RDS; CKDJ 107.9; 94,5 Unique FM; HomeTeam Network
- Website: ottawatitans.com

The Ottawa Titans (French: Titans d'Ottawa), officially Ottawa Titans Baseball Club (Club de baseball des Titans d'Ottawa), are a professional baseball team based in Ottawa. The Titans compete in the National Association of Professional Baseball (NAPB) as a member of the North Division in the Atlantic Conference. Since 2022, the team has played its home games at Ottawa Stadium, originally known as JetForm Park. The Titans became the city's 8th professional baseball franchise succeeding the Eastern League's Ottawa Wanderers, the International League's Ottawa Giants, Ottawa Athletics and Ottawa Lynx, the Intercounty Baseball League's Ottawa Fat Cats, as well as the Can-Am League's Ottawa Rapidz and Ottawa Champions.

Founded in 2020, the Titans played their inaugural season in 2022 due to the prolonged COVID-19 pandemic in Ontario. The franchise was created as part of the planned 2021 Frontier League expansion.

The Titans have made it to the playoffs three times in franchise history, in 2022, 2024, and 2026. They lost both times in 2022 and 2024 in the semifinal round against their fierce rivals, the Québec Capitales. In 2026, however, they made it to the championship round after beating the Jackals and Boulders in the first two rounds. The Titans beat the Evansville Otters in four games to earn their first league championship. The Titans mascot is Cappy.

== History ==
After the 2019 season, the Can-Am League merged with the Frontier League, with five of the six remaining teams joining the league. The remaining team, the Ottawa Champions, were not invited to take part, but it was not immediately clear if they would fold or go on hiatus as owner Miles Wolff, looked to sell the team. He could not find a buyer, and the team folded operations.

In September 2020, the FL decided to expand to Ottawa, granting a franchise to a group led by Sam Katz, the former mayor of Winnipeg and owner of the Winnipeg Goldeyes of the American Association; Ottawa Sports and Entertainment Group, who owns the Ottawa 67’s junior hockey team and the Ottawa Redblacks of the Canadian Football League; and local lawyer Jacques J.M. Shore. Following a contest, the team was named the Titans.

On 6 October 2020, Ottawa announced Steve Brook as the team's inaugural manager. Brook previously managed the River City Rascals in the FL from 2010 to 2019. He led the Rascals to a 488–373 record over his nine seasons at the helm including the 2010 and 2019 championships. In December 2020, Ottawa announced the team name as Ottawa Titans a result of a name-the-team contest, and the team colours in the tradition of Ottawa sports franchises such as the Ottawa Redblacks, Ottawa 67's, and Ottawa Senators.

With the Canada-United states border closing in March 2020, the Titans' inaugural season was deferred to 2022. In 2021, the Canadian players from the Ottawa Titans, Québec Capitales and Trois-Rivières Aigles were combined to create a single team called Équipe Québec. The team played away from home in the first half of the season, returning to Canada in late July to play 21 home games, shared between Stade Canac in Quebec City and Stade Quillorama in Trois-Rivières.

On 30 July 2021, Équipe Québec hosted the New York Boulders at Stade Canac and won the game 10–8 in front of 2,800 spectators, the maximum number that was allowed due to the government of Quebec's public health restrictions.

On 12 September 2021, Équipe Québec qualified for the playoffs, and they faced the Washington Wild Things in the best-of-five Frontier League Division Series (FLDS). The crowd of 3,750 gathered at Stade Canac during Game 3 represented more than 900 people than the number allowed due to public health restrictions, and Québec were able to pull a 3–2 win over the Wild Things. They however lost Games 4 and 5, which ended their unique season. Équipe Québec finished the season first place in the Atlantic Division with a record of 52 wins and 44 losses with an average of 2,288 fans in 24 home games, including the playoffs.

In October 2021, Bobby Brown was hired as the Titans manager for the 2022 season, after Steve Brook, on a one-year contract, became the Gateway Grizzlies manager.

On 13 May 2022, Ottawa opened their inaugural season with a 10–6 road victory against the Joliet Slammers. After a nine-game road trip, the team hosted the Evansville Otters in its home opener on 24 May. The Titans won the game by a final score of 2–0 with Evan Grills pitching eight scoreless innings with 15 strikeouts in front of a crowd of 3,458.

The Titans won seven games out of nine in their final homestand, ending on 1 September. The next day, Ottawa qualified for the playoffs on the road with a 4–1 victory over the Trois-Rivières Aigles, clinching the Wild Card spot. On 7 September, the Titans defeated the New York Boulders in the Wild Card Game by a 8–2 score to advance to the Division Series. They however lost in the semifinals to the eventual champions, the Québec Capitales 2 games to 1. In their first season in Ottawa, the Titans averaged 1,211 fans per game.

On 31 August 2023, a franchise record crowd of more than 4,600 fans attended the last regular season home game of the season against the Trois-Rivières Aigles. The Titans lost 6–1 to the Aigles and did not qualify for the playoffs. Their average attendance increased by 27% from 2022 to an average of 1,540 per game, for a total of 78,495 over 51 home games.

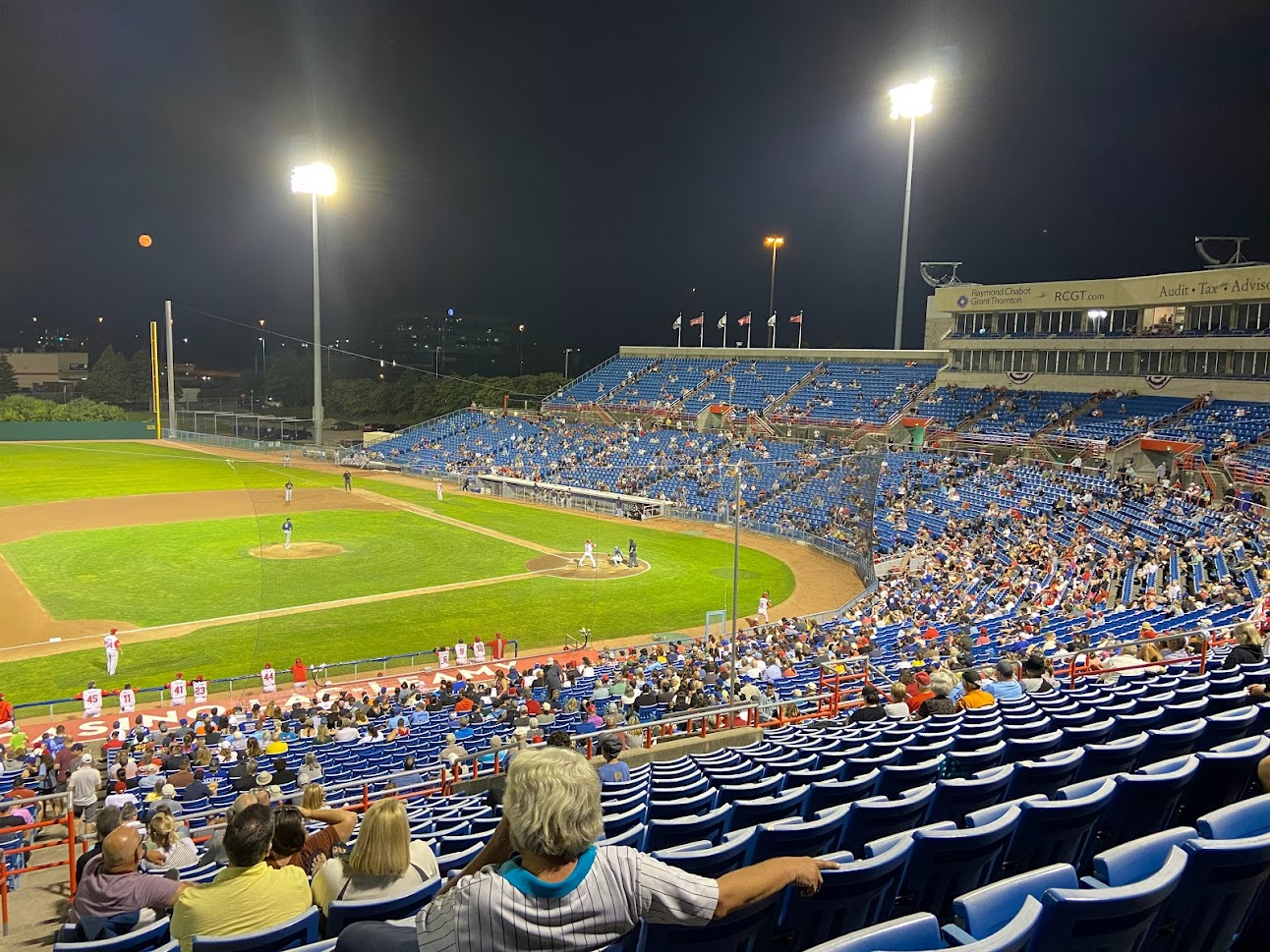
An Ottawa Titans home game against the Québec Capitales in 2022

On 17 April 2024, the Ottawa Titans announced that their assistant general manager Sébastien Boucher will have his number 18 retired by the Québec Capitales on 18 August at Stade Canac as part of their 25th anniversary season of the team.

Ottawa made it to the playoffs again in 2024, and faced the Tri-City ValleyCats in the Wild Card Game. They defeated the ValleyCats 5–2, but however lost to the Capitales again in the FLDS 2 games to 1. Third baseman AJ Wright was selected as the 2024 Third Baseman Of The Year by the Frontier League, and team play-by-play broadcaster Davide Disipio received the Robert Ford Broadcaster of the Year award. The Titans' home average attendance increased once again from 2023, to an average of over 1,900 fans per game.

The Titans were able to break their franchise record crowd from 2023 during their 2025 home opener against the New Jersey Jackals, winning 7–6 in front of 7,152 people at Ottawa Stadium.

The Titans made the playoffs again in 2026 and advanced to the championship round for the first time in franchise history after successfully sweeping the New Jersey Jackals in the Wild Card Round and the New York Boulders in the East Division Conference Finals. They eventually beat the Evansville Otters in four games to earn their first league championship. Coincidentally, the day they won the Championship was Ottawa's Bicentennial, its 200th anniversary.

In September 2026, the Titans received the Frontier League Commissioner’s Award of Excellence for the regular season. The award recognizes efforts to elevate the baseball experience by strengthening connections with fans, corporate partners, and community. Attendance was up 17.5% over 2025 at 116,302 fans, and a 90% increase since 2022. The team claimed an opening night sell out crowd of 10,278 which broke 29-year-old league attendance record and filled the Ottawa Stadium to capacity for the first time since 2002. The club received international media attention for its promotion that let fans exchange a Brady Tkachuk jersey for an AJ Wright jersey. In 2026, the organization raised more than $80,000 to support local children’s charities and organizations.

== Season-by-season record ==
Ottawa Titans
Season	W–L Record	Win %	Finish	Playoffs
2021*	52–44	.542	1st in FL Atlantic	Lost Divisional Round to Washington Wild Things 3–2
2022	56–39	.589	3rd in FL East	Won East Division Wild Card Game over New York Boulders 8–2; Lost Divisional Round to Québec Capitales 2–1
2023	48–48	.500	6th in FL East	Did not qualify
2024	53–42	.558	3rd in FL East	Won East Division Wild Card Game over Tri-City ValleyCats 5–2; Lost Divisional Round to Québec Capitales 2–1
2025	51–45	.531	3rd in FL North	Did not qualify
2026	56–44	.560	2nd in FL North	Won Wild Card Round over New Jersey Jackals 2–0; Won East Division Conference Finals over New York Boulders 3–0; Won Championship over Evansville Otters 3–1
TOTAL	264-218	.546		

*In 2021, Équipe Québec, a combination of the Ottawa Titans, Québec Capitales and Trois-Rivières Aigles, played in the Frontier League. With a record of 52–44, they finished first place in the Atlantic Division, but lost the FLDS to the Washington Wild Things 3 games to 2.

== Current roster ==
Team roster information is from the Ottawa Titans website.

Ottawa Titans roster
Active roster	Coaching staff
Pitchers: 38 Arturo Alvarez; -- Brendan Beard; -- Matthew Beattie; 20 Zach Cameron; 23 Dazon Cole; 29 Jake Dixon; -- Billy Duby; 34 Brett Garcia; 30 Shane Gray; 43 Evan Grills; -- Kaleb Hill; 51 Grant Larson; 40 Brandon Marklund; -- Tino Novis; -- Erasmo Pinales ‡; -- Shane Telfer; -- Koki Togashi; 9 Alfredo Villa; Catchers: 33 Victor Cerny; Infielders: 32 Kaiden Cardoso; 10 Aaron Casillas; 16 Michael Fuhrman; 14 Nolan Machibroda; 5 Jo Oyama; 28 Bradlee Preap; 1 Jackie Urbaez; 37 Felix Valerio; 7 AJ Wright; 26 Joey Wright; 12 Taylor Wright; 47 Cristian Inoa; Outfielders: 17 Lamar Briggs; 11 Canice Ejoh; 19 Jonah Sebring; 40 Ren Tachioka	Manager: 25 Bobby Brown; Coaches: 8 Tom Carcione (pitching); -- David Peterson (assistant); Disabled list; ‡ Inactive list; § Suspended list; updated 23 August 2025 Transactions

== Notable alumni ==
- Evan Grills (2022)
- Joey Terdoslavich (2023)
