= Ottawa Fat Cats =

Logo
Cap insignia

Information
- League: Intercounty Baseball League (2010-2012)
- Location: Ottawa, Ontario
- Ballpark: Ottawa Baseball Stadium
- Founded: 2010
- Folded: 2012
- Nickname: ‘Cats
- Colours: Red, white, black
- Ownership: Ottawa Stadium Group
- General manager: Jonathan Trottier
- Manager: Tim Nelson
- Media: Ottawa Citizen, Ottawa Sun, Rogers TV
- Website: www.ottawafatcats.com

The Ottawa Fat Cats were a semi-professional baseball club in Ottawa, Ontario, Canada. The team began play on May 8, 2010, against the Guelph Royals, and played its home games at the Ottawa Baseball Stadium, the first home game was on May 15, 2010, against the Mississauga Twins. The team was a member of the Intercounty Baseball League but suspended operations at the end of the 2012 season. They were eventually replaced as the primary tenant of what is now Ottawa Stadium by the Ottawa Titans of the Frontier League.

== Founding ==
The Ottawa Stadium Group first became involved in operating a baseball team in 2009. With the Ottawa Baseball Stadium vacant, a city asset was unused. City Councillor Bob Monette arranged some community baseball games, and around the same time the OSG showed some interest in starting another Can-Am baseball team at the stadium. In January 2010, the group instead applied to the Intercounty Baseball League and was accepted. As the other eight IBL teams are located in or within a short distance of Toronto, the Fat Cats had to accept conditions whereby the Cats would pay for accommodations for the visiting teams and also arrange the schedule to allow the other teams to play back-to-back games in Ottawa. In March 2010, the group named Duncan MacDonald as the general manager, while Bill Mackenzie, a former professional baseball player, was hired as manager of the team.

The name and logo of the team were announced at a news conference on March 24, 2010. The name 'Fat Cats' was chosen to poke fun at the public image of federal public servants employed in the city. The Cats used the traditional red, black and white used by Ottawa teams. The cap logo is a stylized 'O' (similar to the alternate logo used by the city's NHL team, the Ottawa Senators), with horizontal black, red and white stripes through the 'O'. A vertical slit in the middle of the 'O' made it look like a cat's eye. The jersey logo was a cartoon cat with the team name written below it. The Cats also arranged concerts at the Stadium in addition to the ball games. The concerts' premise was to raise funds to offset any losses in the operations of the baseball team.

== 2010 New Era All-Star Classic ==
On August 12, it was announced that Ottawa would be the location for the first annual New Era All-Star Classic which features the best of the Intercounty Baseball League facing off in a four-game series against the best of the Ligue de Baseball Senior Élite du Québec (LBSEQ). Games 1 and 2 were held in Ottawa on August 21 and 22 2010, while the series continued in Thetford Mines, Quebec September 4 and 5.

== Results ==
=== 2010 season ===
In their first season the Fat Cats won 11 and lost 25, finished in last place and did not make the playoffs.

=== 2011 season ===
Their second season was a great success, finishing with 16 wins and 18 losses during the regular season, good for 6th place, but winning 9 and losing 5 during the playoff, reaching the finals and losing to the champion Brantford Red Sox.

=== 2012 season ===
The Fat Cats final season saw them finish with an 18 and 18 record, good for a 5th place tie for the last playoff spot, but they bowed out in the first round in 6 games.

=== Season-by-season records ===
Ottawa Fat Cats (2010-2012)
Season	Total	Finished	Playoffs
2010	11-25	.306	Did not qualify
2011	16-18	.470	9 wins and 5 losses, lost final to Brantford Red Sox
2012	18-18	.500	Lost in first round in 6 games
Regular season totals	45-61	.425	
Postseason Totals	11-9	.550	
Combined Totals	56-70	.444	

== Attendance ==
=== 2010 season ===
In their first season in Ottawa, the Fat Cats did very well in attendance. They averaged 3,328 per game for a total of 36,611 on the season despite playing many doubleheaders and having the fewest openings compared to any other team.

=== 2011 season ===
The Ottawa Fat Cats made it into The IBL finals only to lose to the Brantford Rex Sox. The Fat Cats however drew a total of 49,491 for an average of 4,499 fans per game during the regular season, an increase of more than 50% from 2010. In the playoffs, the Fat Cats averaged 5,120 fans per game and drew a total of 35,843 in only seven games. A franchise record crowd of 7,355 attended game 3 of the finals against the Brantford Red Sox. The season total was 85,334 fans.

For the 2012 season, the team’s attendance was not published.

== Final roster ==
Ottawa Fat Cats roster
Active roster	Coaching staff
Pitchers: 30 (Canada) Danny Desclouds; 11 (Canada) Matt Hummel; 5 (Canada) Bryce MacDonald-Wilson; 27 (Canada) Brett Sabourin; 16 (Canada) Eric Boisvert; 22 (Canada) Josh Soffer; 24 (United States) Brandon Huffman; 28 (Canada) William Sebastian; 20 (Canada) Tyler Durward; 2 (Canada) James Amelotte; Catchers: 26 (Israel) Eitan Maoz; 7 (Canada) Pat Gagnon; Infielders: 8 (Canada) Mark Charrette; 3 (Canada) Chris Latimer; 10 (Canada) Matt McGovern; 4 (Canada) Cody Mombourquette; 23 (United States) Jason Coker; Outfielders: 7 (United States) Kevin Deitrich; 17 (Canada) Joe Stone; 21 (United States) LaDale Hayes; 42 (Canada) Kevin Miller; 9 (Canada) Wade Wilson	Manager: 33 (Canada) Tim Nelson; Coaches: 00 (Nicaragua) Rudy Vallejos; 7 (Canada) Pat Gagnon; Disabled list; ‡ Inactive list; § Suspended list; updated June 10, 2012

== See also ==
- Ottawa Lynx, active 1993–2007
- Ottawa Rapidz/Rapids and also as Ottawa Voyageurs, active 2008-2009
- Ottawa Champions, active 2015–2020
