= Terance Marin =

American baseball player (born 1989)

Free agent
- Pitcher
- Born: August 21, 1989 (age 36); Modesto, California, U.S.
- Bats: Right Throws: Right

CPBL debut
- June 27, 2017, for the Uni-President 7-Eleven Lions

CPBL statistics (through 2017 season)
- Win–loss record: 1–1
- Earned run average: 10.71
- Strikeouts: 12
- Stats at Baseball Reference

Teams
- Uni-President 7-Eleven Lions (2017)

Terance Marin (born August 21, 1989) is an American professional baseball pitcher who is a free agent. He has previously played in the Chinese Professional Baseball League (CPBL) for the Uni-President 7-Eleven Lions and in the Mexican League.

== Career ==
=== Chicago White Sox ===
On July 29, 2010, Marin signed with the Chicago White Sox as an undrafted free agent. He split his first professional season between the rookie-level Bristol White Sox and Single-A Kannapolis Intimidators, posting a combined 3.21 ERA with 14 strikeouts in nine games. Marin returned to Kannapolis for the 2011 season, making 26 appearances out of the bullpen, in which he logged a 3-1 record and 1.99 ERA with 38 strikeouts over 49 2/3 innings.

Marin split the 2012 campaign between Kannapolis and the High-A Winston-Salem Dash. In 42 relief appearances for the two affiliates, he compiled an aggregate 7-7 record and 2.12 ERA with 91 strikeouts and 10 saves across 89 1/3 innings pitched.

Marin made 33 appearances (7 starts) for High-A Winston-Salem in 2013, posting a 5-5 record and 4.76 ERA with 70 strikeouts across 92 2/3 innings pitched. On April 11, 2014, Marin was released by the White Sox organization.

=== Evansville Otters ===
Following his release from the White Sox, Marin reconnected with his former Winston-Salem teammate Max Peterson, who convinced him to sign with the Evansville Otters of the Frontier League. On May 7, 2014, he officially signed with the team. In six starts for the Otters, Marin posted a 4-1 record and 2.06 ERA with 39 strikeouts across 39 1/3 innings pitched.

=== Chicago White Sox (second stint) ===
On June 19, 2014, Marin signed a minor league contract to return to the Chicago White Sox organization. He made 16 appearances (12 starts) split between the High-A Winston-Salem Dash and Double-A Birmingham Barons, accumulating a 4-5 record and 4.34 ERA with 72 strikeouts over 83 innings of work.

In 2015, Marin was briefly loaned to the Toros de Tijuana of the Mexican League, where he recorded a 2-5 record and 4.94 ERA with 36 strikeouts in 47 1/3 innings pitched across 10 appearances (nine starts). He spent the remainder of the year with the Triple-A Charlotte Knights, where he posted a 3-4 record and 2.93 ERA with 43 strikeouts and one save across 76 2/3 innings. Marin elected free agency following the season on November 7, 2015.

On November 21, 2015, Marin re-signed with the White Sox organization on a new minor league contract. He spent the 2016 season with the Triple-A Charlotte, compiling an 8-7 record and 4.66 ERA with 59 strikeouts in 110 innings pitched across 26 appearances (16 starts). Marin was released by Chicago on March 30, 2017.

=== Uni-President 7-Eleven Lions ===
On June 5, 2017, Marin signed with the Uni-President 7-Eleven Lions of the Chinese Professional Baseball League. In five appearances (four starts) for the team, he struggled to a 10.71 ERA with 12 strikeouts across 19 1/3 innings pitched. Marin was released by the Lions on August 4.

=== Tecolotes de los Dos Laredos ===
On March 22, 2018, Marin signed with the Tecolotes de los Dos Laredos of the Mexican League. In 22 starts for the team, he compiled a 10-4 record and 3.00 ERA with 64 strikeouts across 129 1/3 innings pitched.

=== Toros de Tijuana ===
On April 4, 2019, Marin signed with the Toros de Tijuana of the Mexican League. In 18 appearances (17 starts) for Tijuana, Marin logged a 7-3 record and 5.32 ERA with 54 strikeouts over 88 innings of work.

=== Tigres de Quintana Roo ===
On February 17, 2020, Marin was traded to the Tigres de Quintana Roo in exchange for Joshua Corrales. He did not play in a game in 2020 due to the cancellation of the season because of the COVID-19 pandemic. Marin returned to action in 2021, making 12 starts for Quintana Roo, in which he registered a 5-4 record and 5.43 ERA with 37 strikeouts across 61 1/3 innings pitched.

Marin made 14 appearances (12 starts) for Quintana Roo during the 2022 campaign, accumulating a 4-2 record and 5.20 ERA with 16 strikeouts across 62 1/3 innings pitched. He made nine appearances (three starts) for the team in 2023, compiling a 1-1 record and 6.97 ERA with eight strikeouts over 20 2/3 innings of work. Marin was released by the Tigres on June 4, 2023.

=== Saraperos de Saltillo ===
On June 6, 2023, Marin signed with the Saraperos de Saltillo of the Mexican League. In seven appearances (four starts) down the stretch, he pitched to a 2-1 record and 6.62 ERA with 13 strikeouts across 17 2/3 innings pitched.

Marin made four appearances for Saltillo in 2024, but struggled to an 0-1 record and 8.10 ERA with two strikeouts across 6 2/3 innings pitched. On May 27, 2024, Marin was released by the Saraperos.

=== Evansville Otters (second stint) ===
On July 9, 2024, Marin signed with the Evansville Otters of the Frontier League. He made seven starts for Evansville, but struggled to an 0-7 record and 7.90 ERA with 14 strikeouts across 27 1/3 innings pitched.

Marin began the following season on the injured list, and was activated for his season debut on May 27, 2025.

=== Piratas de Campeche ===
On April 21, 2026, Marin signed with the Piratas de Campeche of the Mexican League. Marin made 11 appearances for the Piratas, recording a 7.11 ERA with six strikeouts across 12 2/3 innings pitched.

=== Tigres de Quintana Roo (second stint) ===
On May 25, 2026, Marin was traded to the Tigres de Quintana Roo of the Mexican League. He made two appearances for the Tigres, recording a 27.00 ERA across 2/3 innings pitched. Marin was released by Quintana Roo on June 9.
