= Brandon Marklund =

American baseball player (born 1996)

Ottawa Titans – No. 47
- Pitcher
- Born: June 10, 1996 (age 30); North Vancouver, Canada
- Bats: Right Throws: Right

Brandon Marklund (born June 10, 1996) is a Canadian professional baseball pitcher for the Ottawa Titans of the Frontier League.

== Career ==
Marklund played college baseball at the Bryan College. After going undrafted in the MLB draft, he signed with the Auckland Tuatara of the Australian Baseball League. In 14 games pitched, he went 1–0 with a 2.29 earned run average (ERA) and 15 strikeouts.

=== Kansas City Royals ===
On January 31, 2019, Marklund signed a minor league contract with the Kansas City Royals after he impressed them in a tryout. He also had a tryout with the Arizona Diamondbacks.

Marklund made his debut in the Royals organization with the Single–A Lexington Legends, compiling a 4–0 record and 0.46 ERA with 44 strikeouts and 6 saves across 39 1/3 innings pitched. After the season, he played for the Canada national baseball team in the 2019 WBSC Premier12.

Marklund did not play in a game in 2020 due to the cancellation of the minor league season because of the COVID-19 pandemic. He underwent Tommy John surgery in April 2021 and missed the entirety of the season as a result. He missed the entire 2022 campaign as well, and was released by the Royals organization on April 25, 2023.

=== Winnipeg Goldeyes ===
On April 27, 2023, Marklund signed with the Winnipeg Goldeyes of the American Association of Professional Baseball. In 12 games for the Goldeyes, he struggled to a 15.53 ERA with 9 strikeouts across 13 1/3 innings of work. Marklund was released by the Goldeyes on July 9.

=== Québec Capitales ===
On May 9, 2024, Marklund signed with the Québec Capitales of the Frontier League. He made 6 appearances out of the bullpen, registering a 2.70 ERA with 10 strikeouts over 6 2/3 innings. On June 1, Marklund was released by the Capitales.

=== Welland Jackfish ===
On June 6, 2024, Marklund signed with the Welland Jackfish of the Intercounty Baseball League. In 12 games (6 starts) for Welland, he posted a 1-1 record and 6.42 ERA with 26 strikeouts across 28 innings of work.

On February 10, 2025, Marklund re-signed with the Jackfish.

=== Ottawa Titans ===
On March 28, 2025, Marklund signed with the Ottawa Titans of the Frontier League.
