= Mike Kusiewicz =

Canadian baseball player (born 1976)

- Born: November 1, 1976 (age 49); Montreal, Quebec, Canada
- Education: University of Ottawa
- Occupation: Phys Ed teacher

Michael Edward Kusiewicz (born November 1, 1976) is a Canadian baseball coach and former professional baseball pitcher.

== Baseball career ==
A graduate of University of Ottawa, Kusiewicz played with Team Ontario 1994. He was drafted in the 8th round by the Colorado Rockies in 1994, and was named their Minor League Player of the Year in 1998. A nine-time member of Team Canada, he was part of Team Canada in the 2004 Summer Olympics who finished in fourth place. He played for the Edmonton Cracker-Cats of the Northern League in 2005–06, and was named the Ottawa Baseball Player of the Year in the latter season. He moved on to the Northern League's Winnipeg Goldeyes in 2007, and finally the Ottawa Rapidz in 2008 before retiring. Overall, Mike played with six different major league organizations in his 14-year professional career.

== Post-baseball career ==
Mike graduated from the University of Ottawa and he currently resides in Ottawa. Currently, Mike runs "Mike's Baseball Camps" in Nepean, Ontario year round.
