= Evan Grills =

Canadian baseball player (born 1992)

Ottawa Titans – No. 43
- Pitcher
- Born: June 13, 1992 (age 34); Whitby, Ontario, Canada
- Bats: Left Throws: Left

CPBL debut
- August 18, 2021, for the CTBC Brothers

CPBL statistics (through 2021 season)
- Win–loss record: 1–1
- Earned run average: 5.82
- Strikeouts: 12
- Stats at Baseball Reference

Teams
- CTBC Brothers (2021)

Evan B. Grills (born June 13, 1992) is a Canadian professional baseball pitcher for the Ottawa Titans of the Frontier League. He has previously played in Chinese Professional Baseball League (CPBL) for the CTBC Brothers.

== Career ==
=== Houston Astros ===
Grills was drafted by the Houston Astros in the 10th round, with the 303rd overall selection, of the 2010 Major League Baseball draft. He made his professional debut with the rookie-level Gulf Coast League Astros, struggling to an 8.76 ERA in six appearances. Grills returned to the GCL Astros the following season, going 3-1 with a 3.00 ERA and 29 strikeouts over 13 games.

Grills spent the 2012 season with the Single-A Lexington Legends. In 37 appearances out of the bullpen, he logged a 4-1 record and 4.92 ERA with 42 strikeouts across 71 1/3 innings pitched. Grills made 16 appearances (8 starts) for the Low-A Tri-City ValleyCats in 2013, pitching to a 7-1 record and 3.34 ERA with 54 strikeouts over 62 innings of work.

Grills split 2014 between the Single-A Quad Cities River Bandits and High-A Lancaster JetHawks. In 26 appearances (16 starts) for the two affiliates, he logged a 5-6 record and 3.43 ERA with 73 strikeouts and three saves across 120 2/3 innings pitched. Grills spent the 2015 campaign with High-A Lancaster, struggling to a 3-5 record and 7.20 ERA with 36 strikeouts over 13 games (9 starts).

Grills split 2016 between Lancaster, the Double-A Corpus Christi Hooks, and Triple-A Fresno Grizzlies. In 24 appearances (19 starts) for the three affiliates, he posted a cumulative 9-8 record and 3.71 ERA with 100 strikeouts across 135 2/3 innings pitched. Grills elected free agency following the season on November 7, 2016.

=== Colorado Rockies ===
On November 15, 2016, Grills signed a minor league contract with the Colorado Rockies. He did not appear for the organization in 2017 due to injury. Grills made 16 starts for the Double-A Hartford Yard Goats in 2018, registering a 4-5 record and 3.90 ERA with 81 strikeouts across 85 1/3 innings pitched.

Grills spent 2019 with the Triple-A Albuquerque Isotopes, posting a 1-3 record and 5.70 ERA with 33 strikeouts across 14 games (3 starts). He did not play in a game in 2020 due to the cancellation of the minor league season because of the COVID-19 pandemic. He was released by the Rockies organization on June 27, 2020.

=== Winnipeg Goldeyes ===
On July 4, 2020, Grills signed with the Winnipeg Goldeyes of the American Association of Professional Baseball. In 11 appearances (6 starts) for Winnipeg, he compiled a 3-2 record and 4.89 ERA with 44 strikeouts across 38 2/3 innings pitched.

=== CTBC Brothers ===
On April 7, 2021, Grills signed with the CTBC Brothers of the Chinese Professional Baseball League. In 3 starts for the Brothers, he logged a 1-1 record and 5.82 ERA with 12 strikeouts over 17 innings of work. Grills was released by the team on October 11.

=== Ottawa Titans ===
On March 11, 2022, Grills signed with the Ottawa Titans of the Frontier League. In 15 starts for Ottawa, he posted a 4-6 record and 3.53 ERA with 110 strikeouts across 99 1/3 innings pitched.

=== Guelph Royals ===
On June 3, 2024, Grills signed with the Guelph Royals of the Intercounty Baseball League. In 5 starts for the team, Grills posted a 2-2 record and 2.80 ERA with 43 strikeouts across 35 1/3 innings pitched.

=== Ottawa Titans (second stint) ===
On April 20, 2025, Grills signed with the Ottawa Titans of the Frontier League; he was placed on the 60-day injured list on August 20. In nine starts for Ottawa, Grills compiled a 4-4 record and 4.89 ERA with 48 strikeouts over 57 innings of work.

=== Olmecas de Tabasco ===
On April 9, 2026, Grills signed with the Olmecas de Tabasco of the Mexican League. In 12 starts for the Olmecas, he posted a 3–3 record with a 7.27 ERA and 41 strikeouts across 52 innings of work. On June 29, Grills was released by Tabasco.

=== Ottawa Titans (third stint) ===
On July 7, 2026, Grills signed with the Ottawa Titans of the Frontier League.
