= Ottawa Stadium =

Baseball Stadium in Ottawa, Ontario

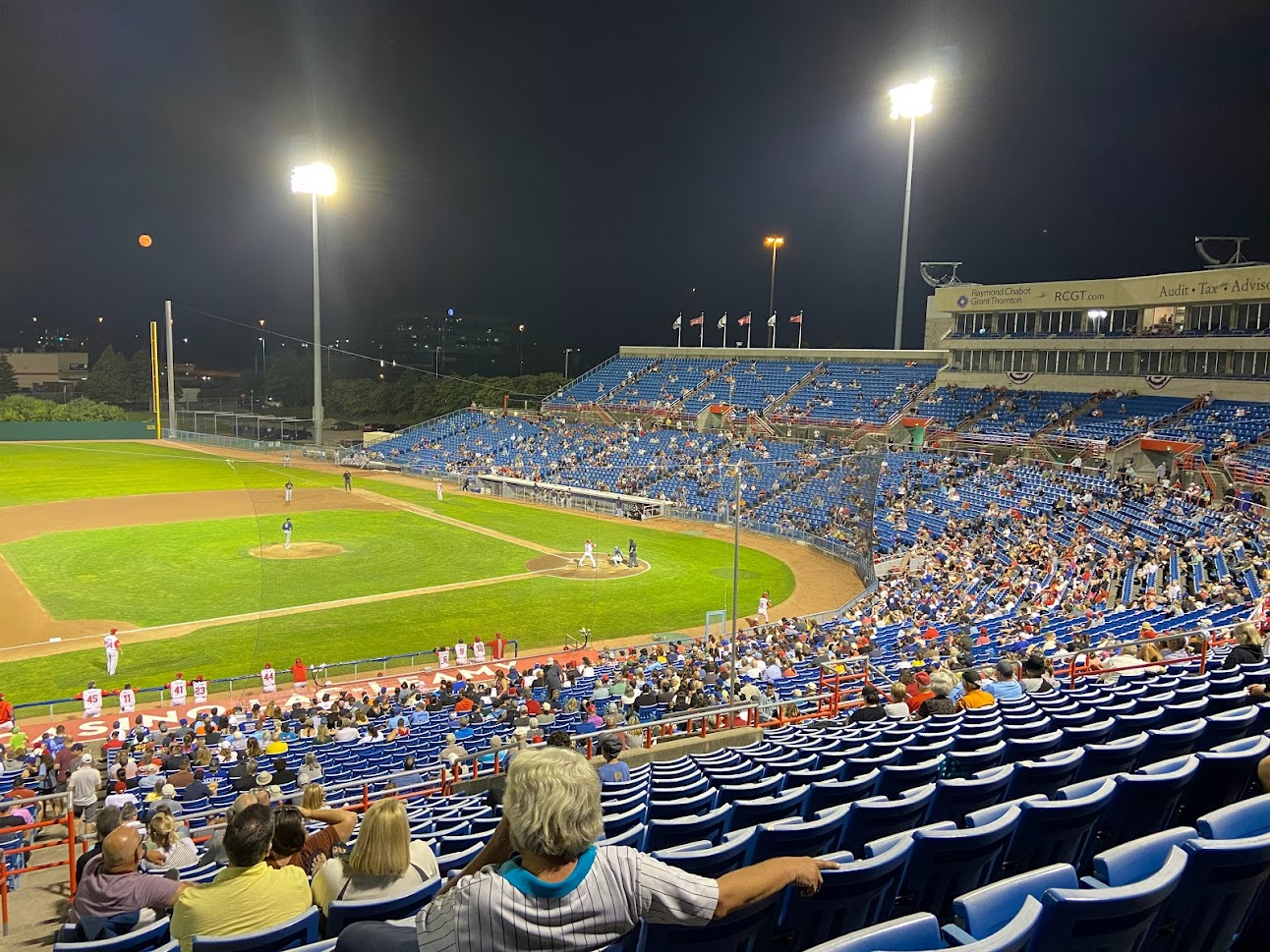
- Interactive map of Ottawa Stadium
- Former names: JetForm Park (1993–2002); Lynx Stadium (2002–2007); Ottawa Baseball Stadium (2008–2015); Raymond Chabot Grant Thornton Park (2015–2021)
- Address: 300 Coventry Road
- Location: Ottawa, Ontario, Canada
- Coordinates: 45°25′12.51″N 75°39′12.85″W
- Owner: City of Ottawa
- Operator: Ottawa Titans
- Capacity: Baseball: 10,332 (1993–2015); 10,278 (2015–present); Concerts: 15,000
- Surface: Grass
- Field size: Left field: 325 ft (99 m); Centre field: 404 ft (123 m); Right field: 325 ft (99 m)
- Public transit: Tremblay station

Construction
- Opened: April 17, 1993
- Renovated: 2012–2014, 2021–2022
- Cost: CA$17 million

Tenants
- Ottawa Lynx (IL) 1993–2007; Ottawa Rapidz (CAL) 2008; Ottawa Fat Cats (IBL) 2010–2012; Ottawa Champions (CAL) 2015–2019; Ottawa Titans (NAPB) 2022–present

Ottawa Stadium is a baseball stadium in Ottawa, Ontario, Canada, with a seating capacity of 10,278. The stadium is located in the city's east end near the interchange of Queensway and Vanier Parkway. It has been used for minor-league professional baseball and music concerts since 1993. It is the home of the Ottawa Titans of the National Association of Professional Baseball (NAPB).

== History ==
The stadium was built to house the Ottawa Lynx of the International League and opened prior to the 1993 season. In its first season, the Lynx sold out 43 games and set an International League attendance record by averaging 9,772 fans per game. However, annual attendance steadily declined from there, except for a modest increase in 2001. By 2006, Ottawa had the lowest average attendance in the league, and the Lynx relocated after the 2007 season.

After the departure of the Lynx, the City of Ottawa considered other proposals for the site but kept the stadium as a baseball facility for the following season. Among the proposals rejected by the city in 2007 were:

- conversion of the stadium into the "Steelback Centre", a variable-use complex that could host 25,000 people for concerts and 15,000 for sporting events as proposed by Frank D'Angelo of Steelback Brewery;
- replacement of the stadium by a casino;
- replacement of the stadium with a larger Ottawa Congress Centre;
- redevelopment of the site as conventional retail or office space.

A new team, the Ottawa Rapidz of the Can-Am League, was established in December 2007 and began to play in 2008. Despite attracting higher attendance than the Lynx in its final season, the Rapidz declared bankruptcy on September 29, 2008. A new team, the Voyageurs, was announced by the Can-Am League for the 2009 season. However, the league was faced with a lack of prospective owners for the team and with declining economic conditions and disbanded the Voyageurs in March 2009.

The stadium remained unused in 2009 except for a late-August series of community baseball games sponsored by Ottawa city councillor Bob Monette. Earlier, following the demise of the Voyageurs, Monette had suggested that the stadium be dismantled and the land sold to generate funds which could be applied to a new sports venue.

In August 2009, area businessmen Dave Butler and Duncan MacDonald presented a proposal which would renovate the existing stadium facility for activities throughout the year, including use as a venue for Winterlude.

In January 2010, the Intercounty Baseball League voted 6–2 in favour of presenting the Ottawa Stadium Group with an expansion franchise that would play at the Ottawa Baseball Stadium On March 10, 2010, the IBL confirmed that the application for an IBL expansion franchise had been accepted. The new team, the Ottawa Fat Cats, played from 2010 through 2012.

After spending two years negotiating with various ownership groups to bring a Double-A baseball franchise to Ottawa, including a prospective deal with Mandalay Baseball which required the city to invest $40 million in stadium renovations, the city signed a ten-year lease with the Can-Am League to field a team in 2015, named the Ottawa Champions, however the Can-Am League merged with the Frontier League after the 2019 season and the Champions were left off the 2020 Frontier League schedule, leaving the stadium again without a tenant.

In September 2020, the establishment of the Ottawa Titans was announced, with a 10-year lease to play at the stadium.

During the Freedom Convoy 2022 protests, the Titans permitted the city to permit protester's use of the parking lot for one weekend, an attempt to alleviate congestion. Protesters instead set up a long term supply centre at the facility.

On May 8, 2026, the Titans played their home opener at Ottawa Stadium in front of a league-record attendance of 10,278 fans. It is also the stadium's first sold-out crowd since September 2002.

=== Branding ===
Ottawa company JetForm first bought the naming rights to the stadium in 1993 and was named the JetForm Park. The name was changed to Lynx Stadium after the 2002 season when JetForm changed its name to Accelio. From 2008 to 2015, it was known as the Ottawa Baseball Stadium. On March 12, 2015, it was announced that accounting firm Raymond Chabot Grant Thornton had signed a three-year naming rights deal, renaming the stadium to Raymond Chabot Grant Thornton Park, also known as RCGT Park. In 2021, the city renamed the facility as the Ottawa Stadium.

== Design ==
The stadium is in the split-level design, with a concourse running around the middle of the seating bowl. This concourse is at street level, so fans in the "lower" seats walk down, and fans in the "upper" seats walk up. All seats are blue chair-back models. Concessions, restrooms, a gift shop, and a kids' play area are located along a wider concourse (also at street level) located underneath the upper seats.

The stadium also features skyboxes and the "Upper Deck" restaurant (No longer operational) perched behind home plate. The windows do not open, there is no outdoor seating at this level. Access is by elevator from the concourse below. This room is now labelled an event space, can be booked for parties of 50 plus. There are open-air picnic tables down the left-field line which are also available to all fans.

Coventry Road runs along the left-field fence, and games can easily be seen from the street while driving or walking. There is less than 50 feet (15 m) of buffer between the stadium wall and the road, so flying balls can occasionally pose a hazard to passing cars.

== Concerts ==
Concerts are occasionally held at Ottawa Stadium, with seven different occasions since 1993:

- 19 July 1998: Stardust Picnic with Blue Rodeo, Great Big Sea, 54-40, The Waltons and Weeping Tile;
- 20–21 September 2002: Molson Canadian Snowjam featuring Treble Charger, Rascalz, Dropkick Murphys, Goldfinger, Swollen Members, Moka Only, Bowling For Soup, Simple Plan, Mudmen, 54stance, and Chuck Calibre
- 5 July 2007: Nickelback, Daughtry, Puddle of Mudd, State of Shock
- 30 June – 1 July 2012: Escapade Music Festival
- 4–5 September 2021: Escapade Music Festival
- 15 October 2023: JON Festival
- 27 September 2025: Tacos & Tequilas Festival

== Gallery ==
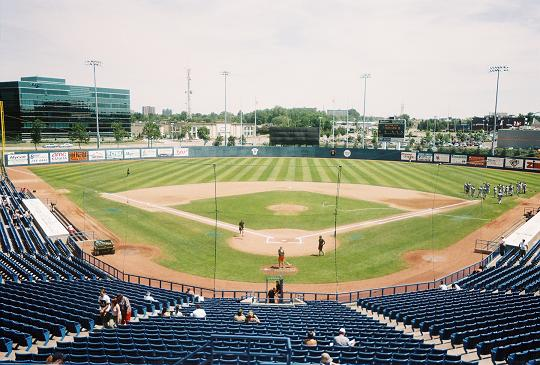
View behind home plate

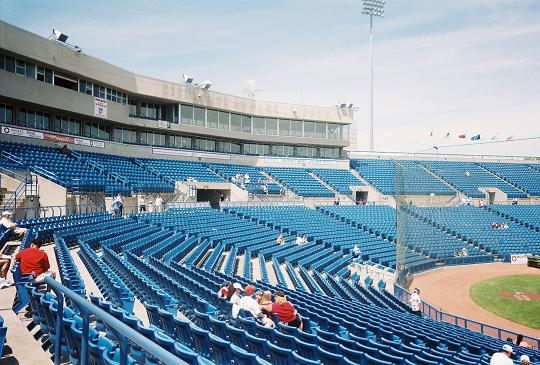
View from south side

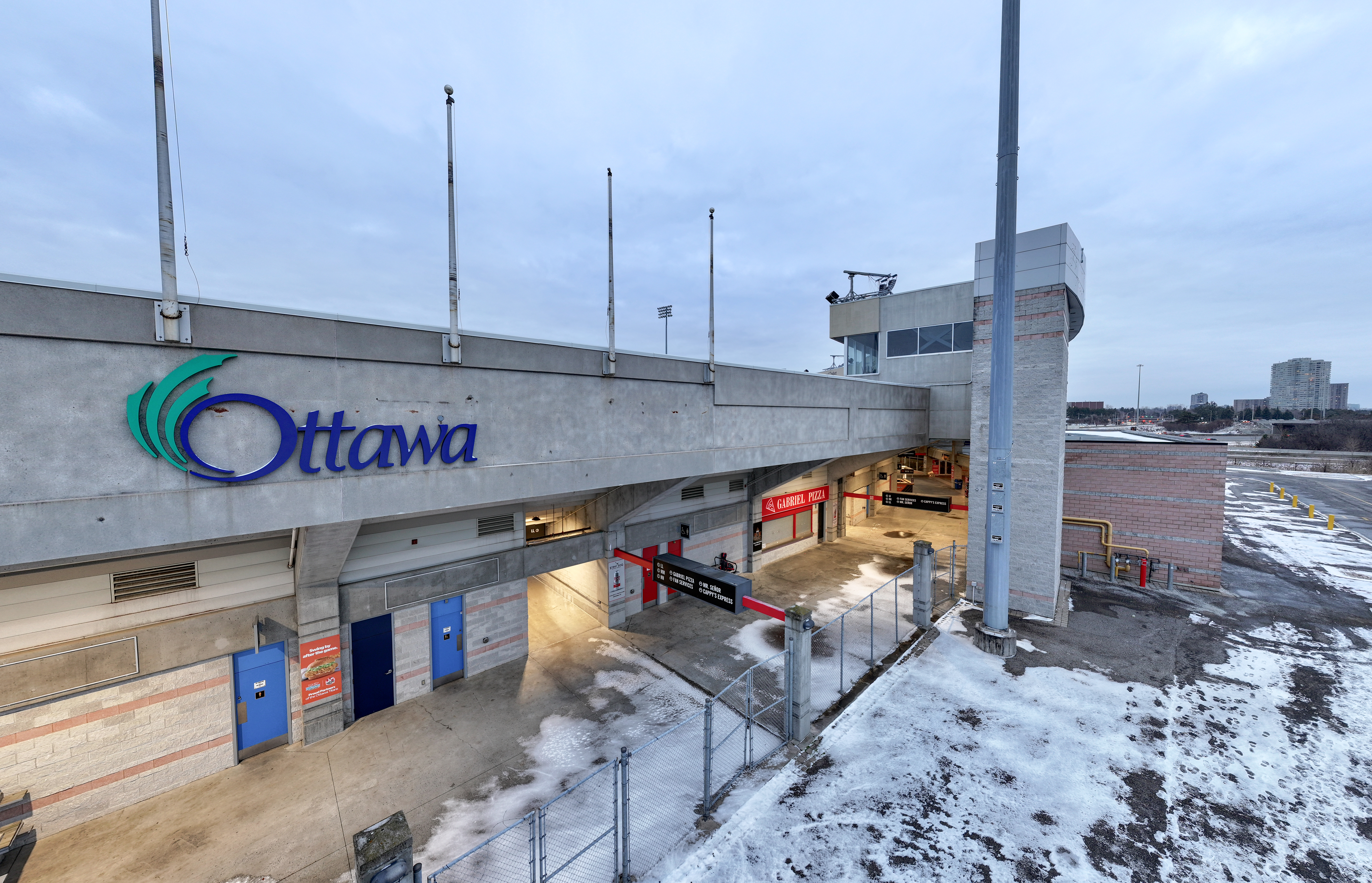
Exterior of Ottawa Stadium
