= 2009 CIS Men's Basketball Championship =

Canadian university basketball championship

The 2009 CIS Men's Final 8 Basketball Tournament was held March 13-15, 2009. It was the second of three consecutive CIS Championships to be held at Scotiabank Place in Ottawa, Ontario and was hosted by the Carleton Ravens.

The host Ravens won the championship, their sixth in seven years. Stu Turnbull of the Ravens was named tournament MVP.

== Championship Bracket ==
First Round: March 13
1	Carleton Ravens (33-1)	94
8	St. Francis Xavier X-Men (25-7)	57
4	Western Ontario Mustangs (24-7)	75
5	Ottawa Gee Gees (30-6)	48
2	Calgary Dinos (25-6)	76
7	Concordia Stingers (19-4)	67
3	UBC Thunderbirds (29-3)	78
6	Dalhousie Tigers (24-10)	54

Semi-Finals: March 14
1	Carleton Ravens (34-1)	66
4	Western Ontario Mustangs (25-7)	65
2	Calgary Dinos (26-6)	74
3	UBC Thunderbirds (30-3)	79

Final: March 15
1	Carleton Ravens (35-1)	87
3	UBC Thunderbirds (31-3)	77

== Consolation Bracket ==
Consolation Semi-Finals: March 14
5	Ottawa Gee Gees (30-7)	85
8	St. Francis Xavier X-Men (25-8)	63
6	Dalhousie Tigers (24-11)	61
7	Concordia Stingers (19-5)	72

Consolation Final: March 15
5	Ottawa Gee Gees (31-7)	83
7	Concordia Stingers (20-5)	76

Note: All records are against CIS competition only.
