= Ottawa Voyageurs =

Information
- League: Can-Am League (2008–09)
- Location: Ottawa, Ontario
- Ballpark: Ottawa Baseball Stadium
- Founded: 2008
- Disbanded: 2009
- Former name: Ottawa Voyageurs (2009); Ottawa Rapidz (2008); Ottawa Rapids (2007 and 2008 offseasons)
- Colours: 2008 (Rapidz): red
- Ownership: Can-Am League
- General manager: Barry Robinson
- Manager: Tom Carcione

The Ottawa Voyageurs, previously the Ottawa Rapidz, were a professional baseball team based in Ottawa, Ontario, Canada under the Canadian-American Association of Professional Baseball or Can-Am League.

As a Can-Am team, the team played one season as the Ottawa Rapidz at Ottawa Baseball Stadium (now called Raymond Chabot Grant Thornton Park), previously home to the Ottawa Lynx Triple-A minor league franchise. Originally, the team was to be spelled as the Ottawa Rapids until it was renamed prior to the start of their 2008 opening season. After the initial ownership declared bankruptcy, the Can-Am league assumed ownership of the franchise, but suspended the team's operations in March 2009 prior to what would have been a second season.

== History ==
The Rapids were established after the Lynx, an International League team, moved to Allentown, Pennsylvania after the 2007 season to become the Lehigh Valley IronPigs. The Ottawa City Council discussed different possibilities regarding the city-owned stadium and accepted the offer given by Can-Am League president Miles Wolff.

Following their sale to zip.ca, the team name spelling was modified to the Ottawa Rapidz.

On 29 September 2008, amid reports of a $1.4 million team debt, Rapidz management notified the Can-Am league that the team would be dissolved and that bankruptcy proceedings were planned. Rapidz management blamed the City of Ottawa for the situation, citing failed negotiations for the future lease of the stadium.

Despite the first-season bankruptcy, trading of Rapidz players continued in the Can-Am League offseason, with such activity reported as late as 13 October 2008. The Can-Am League announced on 13 November 2008 that a team would operate in Ottawa for 2009, operated directly by the league while new ownership was sought. Can-Am league commissioner Miles Wolff confirmed this development in Ottawa, displaying the original bilingual logo, with the spelling changed back to Rapids (English)/Rapides (French), but cautioned that the name was not yet final and that the team might operate under a new name. In February 2009, the team was rechristened as the Voyageurs after a name-the-team contest won by Michael Jacobsen.

However, the Voyageurs would never take the field as the Can-Am league announced on 30 March 2009 that the team and the Atlantic City Surf would cease operations. League commissioner Miles Wolff indicated the team lacked financial support and "solid ownership" in order for the franchise to continue.

On 3 April 2009, Voyageurs players were made available to the six remaining teams in the league in a dispersal draft.

== Logos and uniforms ==
Former Rapids logo, English, prior to 2008 season

Rapides logo, French, prior to 2008 season

Rapidz former primary logo, 2008

== Standings and statistics ==
=== 2008 season (Rapidz) ===
The Ottawa Rapidz finished last in the Can-Am League, with a 13-34 (.277) performance in the first half of the 2008 season, followed by an 18-29 (.383) record in the second half. The Rapidz tied the New Jersey Jackals for last place in the second half-season.

Total attendance of the 46 Rapidz home games was 147,073 for a per-game average of 3,197.

== 2009 roster ==
Ottawa Voyageurs roster
| Active (22-man) roster | | Coaches |
| Pitchers: (Canada) Adam Hawes; (Canada) Fraser Robinson; (United States) Reid Price; (United States) Noel Baca III; (United States) David Wasylak; (Canada) Matthew Tosoni; (Canada) Tanner Watson; (United States) Mike Cervera; Catchers: (United States) Kyle Geiger; (United States) Gaetan Leduc | Infielders: (Venezuela) Trino Aguilar; (United States) Jake Daubert; (United States) Nate Hall; Outfielders: (United States) Jared L. Lemieux; (United States) Jereme Milons; (United States) Pete Pirman; (United States) Jeff Thomas | Disabled List Inactive List: (Canada) Jeremy Ware; Coaching Staff: (United States) Tom Carcione - Manager; (Canada) Mike Kusiewicz - Pitching Coach |

== Game broadcasts ==
In 2008, local radio broadcasts of 80 Rapidz season games were provided in French by CJRC-FM.

== See also ==
- List of baseball teams in Canada
- Ottawa Lynx
- Ottawa Fat Cats
