= 2018 Can-Am League season =

2018 Can-Am League Season
- League: Canadian American Association of Professional Baseball
- Sport: Baseball
- Duration: May 17 – September 3, 2018
- Games: 323
- Teams: 9

Regular season
- Season champions: Sussex County Miners
- Finals champions: Sussex County Miners
- Runners-up: Quebec Capitales

Can-Am seasons
- 2017 2019

The 2018 season of the Canadian Professional Baseball Association began on May 17, 2018, and ended on September 3, 2018. It was the league's 14th season of operations. Following the regular season, the playoffs were held. The Sussex County Miners defeated the reigning-champion Quebec Capitales in the fourth and deciding game, played on September 15.

== Season summary ==
While the Dominican Republic National team toured during the regular season, there were two additional traveling teams that played all six of the Can-Am League teams; the Salina Stockade and the Hollywood Stars. The Stars played nine games, finishing 1-8, and the Stockade played 18 games, finishing 3-15.

== Standings ==
Team	W	L	Pct.	GB
Sussex County Miners	63	38	.624	–
Québec Capitales	58	44	.569	5.5
Rockland Boulders	54	48	.529	9.5
Trois-Rivières Aigles	53	49	.520	10.5
New Jersey Jackals	50	52	.490	13.5
Ottawa Champions	41	60	.406	22
Salina Stockade*	3	15	.167	18.5
Hollywood Stars*	1	8	.111	16
Dominican Republic national baseball team*	0	9	.000	17

* Teams not eligible for playoffs

== Playoffs ==
Semifinals
1	Sussex County Miners	3
4	Trois-Rivières Aigles	2
2	Quebec Capitales	3
3	Rockland Boulders	1

Finals
1	Sussex County Miners	3
2	Quebec Capitales	1

=== Sussex County vs. Trois-Rivières ===
Sussex County won the series, 3–2.

Game	Date	Score	Location	Time	Attendance
1	September 5	Sussex County 5, Trois-Rivières Aigles 1	Stade Stereo+	3:20	1,503
2	September 6	Sussex County 5, Trois-Rivières Aigles 0	Stade Stereo+	3:00	1,447
3	September 7	Trois-Rivières Aigles 5, Sussex County 3	Skylands Stadium	3:04	1,498
4	September 8	Trois-Rivières Aigles 8, Sussex County 6	Skylands Stadium	3:17	528
5	September 9	Trois-Rivières Aigles 2, Sussex County 3	Skylands Stadium	2:44	-

=== Quebec vs. Rockland ===
Quebec won the series, 3–1.

Game	Date	Score	Location	Time	Attendance
1	September 5	Quebec Capitales 9, Rockland Boulders 6	Palisades Credit Union Park	3:02	608
2	September 6	Quebec Capitales 1, Rockland Boulders 21	Palisades Credit Union Park	2:53	412
3	September 7	Rockland Boulders 2, Quebec Capitales 6	Stade Canac	2:46	2,491
4	September 8	Rockland Boulders 5, Quebec Capitales 6	Stade Canac	2:39	2,263

=== Sussex County vs. Quebec ===
Sussex County won the series, 3–1.

Game	Date	Score	Location	Time	Attendance
1	September 12	Sussex County 5, Quebec Capitales 3	Stade Canac	2:48	2,520
2	September 13	Sussex County 3, Quebec Capitales 4	Stade Canac	2:17	2,281
3	September 14	Quebec Capitales 6, Sussex County 7	Skylands Stadium	2:59	1,006
4	September 15	Quebec Capitales 5, Sussex County 6	Skylands Stadium	3:13	1,391

== Attendance ==
2018 Can-Am League attendance
Team	Total attendance	Average attendance
Rockland Boulders	129,599	2,757
Québec Capitales	126,483	2,386
Trois-Rivières Aigles	91,605	1,869
Ottawa Champions	93,395	1,831
Trois-Rivières Aigles	83,610	1,706
Sussex County Miners	74,827	1,559
