= 2016 Can-Am League season =

2016 Can-Am League Season
- League: Canadian American Association of Professional Baseball
- Sport: Baseball
- Duration: May 19 – September 5, 2016
- Games: 100
- Teams: 6

Regular season
- Season champions: New Jersey Jackals
- Finals champions: Ottawa Champions
- Runners-up: Rockland Boulders

Can-Am seasons
- 2015 2017

The 2016 Canadian American Association of Professional Baseball season began May 19 and ended September 5. Following the regular season, the playoffs were held. It was the 12th season of operation for this professional independent baseball league. The Ottawa Champions won their first ever title in just their second season, defeating the Rockland Boulders in the fifth and deciding game of the league championships, played on September 17.

The Cuba national baseball team took part in the season as part of a goodwill tour. It was the first Cuban-based squad since 1960 to play a professional team in a United States minor or independent league stadium during the regular season. The Cubans stated that they were able to include about half their top national players in the team.

== Season summary ==
On August 21, Ottawa Champions outfielder Sebastien Boucher set a league record for career hits with 752 in a game against the Trois-Rivières Aigles.

Tragedy struck the league on September 4, when the co-owner of the Québec Capitales, Roberto Bissonnette was killed in a helicopter crash in Flatlands, New Brunswick, along with the pilot. Team president Michel Laplant was also in the helicopter, but only suffered from non-life-threatening injuries.

On September 5, former Cy Young Award winning pitcher Éric Gagné pitched for the Ottawa Champions, attracting nearly 8,000 fans. The Champions made it to the league finals in only their second season as a franchise.

=== Tour of Cuban national team ===
The Cuba national baseball team played 20 regular season games as part of the league schedule, though they were ineligible for the playoffs. It was billed as a "goodwill tour" following the opening up of Cuba–United States relations in 2015. This team included Luis Robert, who would later sign with the Chicago White Sox for a contract worth over $50 million, including a $26 million signing bonus, on May 27, 2017. Major league scouts were also interested in Julio Pablo Martinez, who in May 2017 signed to play in the Can-Am League with the Quebec Capitales, along with several other Cuban players. The Cuban team finished with an 11–9 record, including eight of their last ten, and will return in June 2017 to challenge the Ottawa Champions, winners of the 2016 season.

Lazaro Ramirez, a 24-year-old outfielder, defected during the team's series against the Sussex County Miners.

=== Shikoku Island League all-star team ===
After finishing with a 6–10 record in exhibition games during the 2015 Can-Am League season, the all-star team from the Shikoku Island League Plus returned for the 2016 season. Unlike the 2015 tour, the 2016 games were part of the regular season, counting in statistics and standings, as did the games involving the Cuban national team. The Japanese players brought a Japanese custom with them by exchanging gifts with the local teams prior to each series. The Shikoku Island League team finished with a record of 8–12. Many of the games were very close and competitive, with six going to extra innings.

Finally, the Shikoku Island team played the Cuban national team in an exhibition match at Stade Stereo+ in Trois-Rivières, Quebec on July 2, 2016. Despite a three-run eighth inning by Shikoku Island bringing them within one run, the Cubans got the win.

== Standings ==
Team	W	L	Pct.	GB
New Jersey Jackals	62	38	.620	–
Rockland Boulders	58	42	.580	4
Québec Capitales	56	44	.560	6
Ottawa Champions	51	49	.510	11
Sussex County Miners	39	61	.390	23
Trois-Rivières Aigles	35	65	.350	27
Cuba national baseball team*	11	9	.550	11
Shikoku Island*	8	12	.400	14

* Teams not eligible for playoffs

== Playoffs ==
=== Bracket ===
Semifinals
1	New Jersey Jackals	1
4	Ottawa Champions	3
2	Rockland Boulders	3
3	Québec Capitales	2

Finals
4	Ottawa Champions	3
2	Rockland Boulders	2

=== Semifinals ===
==== New Jersey vs. Ottawa ====
Ottawa won the series, 3–1.

Game	Date	Score	Location	Time	Attendance
1	September 7	New Jersey Jackals 11, Ottawa Champions 2	RCGT Park	-	1,193
2	September 8	New Jersey Jackals 3, Ottawa Champions 4	RCGT Park	2:47	1,259
3	September 9	Ottawa Champions 8, New Jersey Jackals 3	Yogi Berra Stadium	3:13	720
4	September 10	Ottawa Champions 7, New Jersey Jackals 2	Yogi Berra Stadium	3:07	475

==== Rockland vs. Québec ====
Rockland won the series, 3–2.

Game	Date	Score	Location	Time	Attendance
1	September 7	Rockland Boulders 4, Québec Capitales 5	Stade Municipal	3:08	3,924
2	September 9	Rockland Boulders 2, Québec Capitales 4	Stade Municipal	2:53	2,010
3	September 10	Québec Capitales 15, Rockland Boulders 16	Palisades Credit Union Park	4:08	2,090
4	September 11	Québec Capitales 2, Rockland Boulders 6	Palisades Credit Union Park	2:53	1,039
5	September 12	Québec Capitales 2, Rockland Boulders 3	Palisades Credit Union Park	2:55	1,470

=== Championship finals ===
==== Rockland vs. Ottawa ====
The road team won every game of the 5-game series, which saw the Ottawa Champions come back from being down two games to none to win three straight games for the championship.

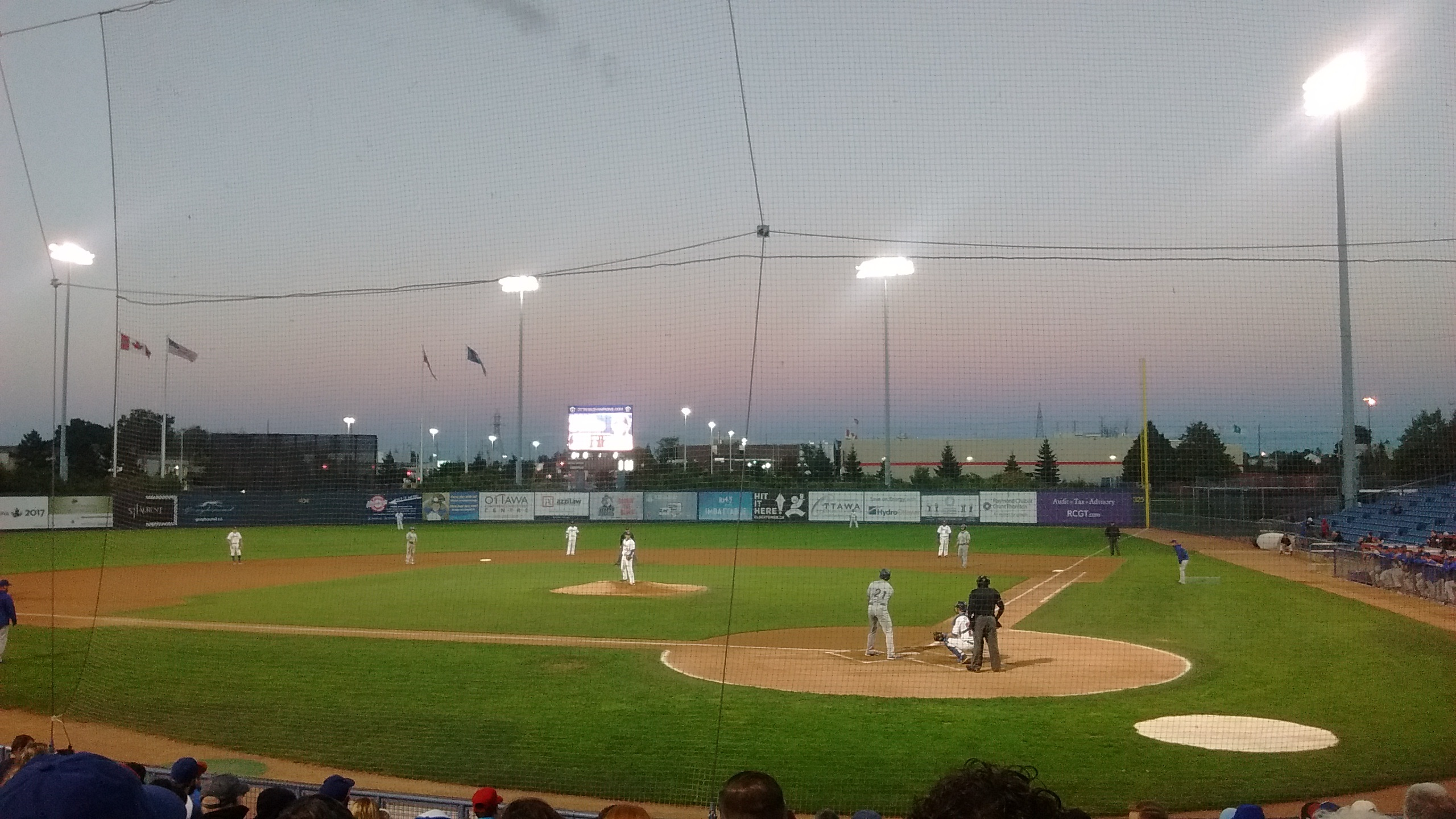
Game 2 action at RCGT Park in Ottawa. The Ottawa Champions are in white, pitching to the Rockland Boulders in grey.

Ottawa won the series, 3-2.

Game	Date	Score	Location	Time	Attendance
1	September 13	Rockland Boulders 6, Ottawa Champions 5	RCGT Park	3:31	3,289
2	September 14	Rockland Boulders 5, Ottawa Champions 4	RCGT Park	3:36	2,412
3	September 15	Ottawa Champions 13, Rockland Boulders 12	Palisades Credit Union Park	4:34	2,015
4	September 16	Ottawa Champions 13, Rockland Boulders 3	Palisades Credit Union Park	2:43	1,247
5	September 17	Ottawa Champions 3, Rockland Boulders 1	Palisades Credit Union Park	2:28	3,314

== Attendance ==
2016 Can-Am League attendance
Team	Total attendance	Average attendance
Rockland Boulders	149,632	2,934
Québec Capitales	146,946	2,773
Ottawa Champions	127,618	2,454
Sussex County Miners	90,237	1,842
Trois-Rivières Aigles	78,948	1,680
New Jersey Jackals	74,335	1,652
