= 2019 Can-Am League season =

2019 Can-Am League Season
- League: Canadian American Association of Professional Baseball
- Sport: Baseball
- Duration: May 16 – September 2, 2019
- Games: 302
- Teams: 9

Regular season
- Season champions: Sussex County Miners
- Finals champions: New Jersey Jackals
- Runners-up: Sussex County Miners

Can-Am seasons
- 2018 2020

The 2019 Canadian American Association of Professional Baseball season began May 16 and ended September 2. It was the 15th season of operations for the league. Following the regular season, the playoffs were held. The New Jersey Jackals defeated the previous defending champions Sussex County Miners in the fourth game of the championship round on September 14, 2019. It was the Jackals’ fifth championship overall as a team for the first time in fifteen years, but it was their first championship title as a member of the Can-Am League.

This would be the last season in Can-Am League history, as the league announced on October 16, 2019 that they would merge with the Frontier League and operate as a 14-team league under the Frontier League banner. All teams except the Ottawa Champions were absorbed by the Frontier League.

== Season summary ==
Once again, the Cuban National Baseball Team and Shikoku Island team both toured during the regular season, facing all six of the Can-Am League teams. This season also saw the Empire Professional Baseball League playing four games. Shortly after this season, the Can-Am League merged with the Frontier League, absorbing five of its teams to make a total of 14 teams.

=== All-star game and home run derby ===
In the 2019 season, the league held a home run derby and all-star game. The events took place on July 9–10, 2019 at Palisades Credit Union Park, home of the Rockland Boulders. In both events, the Can-Am League All-Stars faced the Frontier League All-Stars. The home run derby was played on July 9, 2019, where Boulders star Grant Heyman won the home run derby for the Can-Am League. The all-star game was played the following day, July 10, where the Frontier League defeated the Can-Am League, 7–0. J.J. Hernandez was named the all-star game MVP for the Frontier League.

== Standings ==
Team	W	L	Pct.	GB
Sussex County Miners	61	33	.649	–
Trois-Rivières Aigles	58	37	.611	3.5
Cuban National Baseball Team*	8	7	.533	13.5
New Jersey Jackals	48	46	.511	13
Rockland Boulders	43	50	.462	17.5
Ottawa Champions	41	54	.432	20.5
Quebec Capitales	36	59	.379	25.5
Shikoku Island*	7	12	.368	16.5
Empire League*	0	4	.000	16

* Teams not eligible for playoffs

== Playoffs ==
=== Bracket ===
Semifinals
1	Sussex County Miners	3
4	Rockland Boulders	1
2	Trois-Rivières Aigles	2
3	New Jersey Jackals	3

Finals
1	Sussex County Miners	1
3	New Jersey Jackals	3

=== Semifinals ===
==== Sussex County vs. Rockland ====
Sussex County won the series, 3–1.

Game	Date	Score	Location	Time	Attendance
1	September 4	Sussex County 10, Rockland Boulders 3	Palisades Credit Union Park	3:02	805
2	September 5	Sussex County 3, Rockland Boulders 11	Palisades Credit Union Park	2:47	-
3	September 7 (postponed from September 6 due to inclement weather)	Rockland Boulders 2, Sussex County 6	Skylands Stadium	2:37	950
4	September 8	Rockland Boulders 4, Sussex County 8	Skylands Stadium	3:04	900

==== Trois-Rivieres vs. New Jersey ====
New Jersey won the series, 3–2.

Game	Date	Score	Location	Time	Attendance
1	September 4	Trois-Rivieres 0, New Jersey 3	Yogi Berra Stadium	2:32	1,467
2	September 5	Trois-Rivieres 5, New Jersey 0	Yogi Berra Stadium	3:00	-
3	September 6	New Jersey 7, Trois-Rivieres 2	Stade Stereo+	3:26	1,887
4	September 7	New Jersey 4,Trois-Rivieres 17	Stade Stereo+	3:32	1,012
5	September 8	New Jersey 4, Trois-Rivieres 3	Stade Stereo+	3:16	1,989

=== Championship ===
==== New Jersey vs. Sussex County ====
New Jersey won the series, 3–1.

Game	Date	Score	Location	Time	Attendance
1	September 10	Sussex County 2, New Jersey 3	Yogi Berra Stadium	3:12	407
2	September 12	Sussex County 12, New Jersey 3	Yogi Berra Stadium	3:25	508
3	September 13	New Jersey 2, Sussex County 0	Skylands Stadium	2:39	777
4	September 14	New Jersey 8, Sussex County 7	Skylands Stadium	3:47	635

== Attendance ==
2019 Can-Am League attendance
Team	Total attendance	Average attendance
Rockland Boulders	123,999	2,583
Québec Capitales	119,060	2,381
Ottawa Champions	88,119	1,798
New Jersey Jackals	76,658	1,742
Sussex County Miners	72,594	1,688
Trois-Rivières Aigles	85,506	1,677
