= 2015 Can-Am League season =

2015 Can-Am League Season
- League: Canadian American Association of Professional Baseball
- Sport: Baseball
- Duration: May 21 – September 7, 2015
- Games: 328
- Teams: 8

Regular season
- Season champions: Rockland Boulders
- Finals champions: Trois-Rivières Aigles
- Runners-up: New Jersey Jackals

Can-Am seasons
- 2014 2016

The 2015 Canadian American Association of Professional Baseball season began on May 21, 2015, and ended on September 7, 2015. Following the regular season, the playoffs were held. It was the 11th season of operations for this professional independent baseball league. The Trois-Rivières Aigles won their first championship title in just their third season, defeating the New Jersey Jackals in the fifth and deciding game of the league championships, played on September 20, 2015.

In particular, this season was notable for the tours of the traveling Garden State Grays and the Japanese team, Shikoku Island All-Stars. This season was also the first time since 2011 that the league playoff bracket had both a semifinals round and a championship round. From 2012 to 2014, since there were very few teams in the league and only the top two made the playoffs, there was only a championship round played.

== Season summary ==
=== Shikoku Island League all-star team ===
The Shikoku Island All-Stars played 16 games in June 2015 against all of the Can-Am League teams, finishing 6–10.

=== Garden State Grays ===
This was the first time since the 2007 season that the Grays played in the Can-Am League. The other time that the Grays played was in the Can-Am League's inaugural year in 2005. Unfortunately, the Grays finished with an appalling 13–47 record. Since then, they never returned to the Can-Am League.

== Standings ==
Team	W	L	Pct.	GB
Rockland Boulders	63	34	.649	–
Québec Capitales	54	42	.563	8.5
New Jersey Jackals	54	43	.557	9
Trois-Rivières Aigles	50	45	.521	12.5
Ottawa Champions	46	50	.479	16.5
Sussex County Miners	38	59	.392	25
Shikoku Island*	6	10	.375	16.5
Garden State Grays*	13	47	.217	31.5

* Teams not eligible for playoffs

== Playoffs ==
=== Bracket ===
Semifinals
1	Rockland Boulders	2
4	Trois-Rivières Aigles	3
2	Quebec Capitales	2
3	New Jersey Jackals	3

Finals
4	Trois-Rivières Aigles	3
2	New Jersey Jackals	2

=== Semifinals ===
==== Rockland vs. Trois-Rivieres ====
Trois-Rivieres won the series, 3-2.

Game	Date	Score	Location	Time	Attendance
1	September 9	Rockland Boulders 1, Trois-Rivieres Aigles 2	Stade Fernand-Bédard	-	-
2	September 10	Rockland Boulders 4, Trois-Rivieres Aigles 2	Stade Fernand-Bédard	2:50	3,347
3	September 11	Trois-Rivieres Aigles 6, Rockland Boulders 7	Provident Bank Park	3:04	2,608
4	September 12	Trois-Rivieres Aigles 4, Rockland Boulders 3	Provident Bank Park	3:49	1,648
5	September 13	Trois-Rivieres Aigles 7, Rockland Boulders 2	Provident Bank Park	2:47	-

==== New Jersey vs. Quebec ====
New Jersey won the series, 3-2.

Game	Date	Score	Location	Time	Attendance
1	September 9	Quebec Capitales 3, New Jersey Jackals 4	Yogi Berra Stadium	2:56	563
2	September 11	Quebec Capitales 4, New Jersey Jackals 3	Yogi Berra Stadium	3:31	659
3	September 12	New Jersey Jackals 5, Quebec Capitales 11	Stade Canac	3:18	1,054
4	September 13	New Jersey 5, Quebec Capitales 2	Stade Canac	3:37	743
5	September 15	New Jersey 5, Quebec Capitales 4	Stade Canac	2:58	2,615

=== Championship finals ===
==== New Jersey vs. Trois-Rivieres ====
Trois-Rivieres won the series, 3-2.

Game	Date	Score	Location	Time	Attendance
1	September 16	New Jersey Jackals 0, Trois-Rivieres Aigles 12	Stade Fernand-Bédard	3:03	3,856
2	September 17	New Jersey Jackals 8, Trois-Rivieres Aigles 6	Stade Fernand-Bédard	3:16	4,018
3	September 18	Trois-Rivieres Aigles 7, New Jersey Jackals 3	Yogi Berra Stadium	3:15	865
4	September 19	Trois-Rivieres Aigles 5, New Jersey Jackals 7	Yogi Berra Stadium	3:10	848
5	September 20	Trois-Rivieres Aigles 2, New Jersey Jackals 1	Yogi Berra Stadium	2:41	-

== Attendance ==
2015 Can-Am League attendance
Team	Total attendance	Average attendance
Rockland Boulders	161,796	3,053
Québec Capitales	130,510	2,559
Ottawa Champions	115,880	2,228
Trois-Rivières Aigles	96,997	1,865
New Jersey Jackals	78,913	1,578
Sussex County Miners	56,988	1,187
