= 2017 Can-Am League season =

2017 Can-Am League Season
- League: Canadian American Association of Professional Baseball
- Sport: Baseball
- Duration: May 18 – September 4, 2017
- Games: 317
- Teams: 8

Regular season
- Season champions: Quebec Capitales
- Finals champions: Quebec Capitales
- Runners-up: Rockland Boulders

Can-Am seasons
- 2016 2018

The 2017 Canadian American Association of Professional Baseball season began on May 18, 2017, and ended on September 4, 2017. Following the regular season, the playoffs were held. It was the league's 13th season of operations. The Quebec Capitales defeated the Rockland Boulders in the championship round to capture their seventh championship. To date, the Capitales have the most championships out of any team in the Can-Am League.

== Season summary ==
This season saw the tours of the Cuban and Dominican Republic National traveling teams. The Cuban team played 21 games, finishing 5-16, while the Dominican Republic team played 17 games, finishing 2-15.

=== All Star Game ===
The 2017 Can-Am League All Star Game took place on July 25, 2017, at Raymond Chabot Grant Thornton Park, home of the Ottawa Champions. There, the Can-Am League All Stars played against the American Association of Independent Professional Baseball All-Stars. The final score was the Can-Am League All Stars 3, the American Association of Independent Professional Baseball All-Stars 2.

== Standings ==
Team	W	L	Pct.	GB
Québec Capitales	65	35	.650	–
Rockland Boulders	64	35	.646	.5
New Jersey Jackals	55	45	.550	10
Sussex County Miners	45	54	.455	19.5
Ottawa Champions	42	56	.429	22
Trois-Rivières Aigles	39	61	.390	26
Cuba national baseball team*	5	16	.238	20.5
Dominican Republic national baseball team*	2	15	.118	21.5

* Teams not eligible for playoffs

== Playoffs ==
=== Bracket ===
Semifinals
1	Quebec Capitales	3
4	Sussex County Miners	0
2	Rockland Boulders	3
3	New Jersey Jackals	1

Finals
1	Quebec Capitales	3
2	Rockland Boulders	0

=== Semifinals ===
==== Quebec vs. Sussex County ====
Quebec won the series, 3–0.

Game	Date	Score	Location	Time	Attendance
1	September 7	Quebec Capitales 4, Sussex County Miners 2	Skylands Stadium	3:34	247
2	September 8	Quebec Capitales 10, Sussex County Miners 6	Skylands Stadium	3:20	309
3	September 9	Sussex County 1, Quebec Capitales 6	Stade Canac	3:01	2,109

=== Rockland vs. New Jersey ===
Rockland won the series, 3–1.

Game	Date	Score	Location	Time	Attendance
1	September 7	Rockland Boulders 3, New Jersey Jackals 1	Yogi Berra Stadium	3:19	440
2	September 8	Rockland Boulders 5, New Jersey Jackals 0	Yogi Berra Stadium	3:01	543
3	September 9	New Jersey Jackals 7, Rockland Boulders 1	Palisades Credit Union Park	3:43	2,015
4	September 10	New Jersey Jackals 1, Rockland Boulders 9	Palisades Credit Union Park	3:00	1,003

=== Quebec vs. Rockland ===
Quebec won the series, 3–0.

Game	Date	Score	Location	Time	Attendance
1	September 12	Quebec Capitales 7, Rockland Boulders 5	Palisades Credit Union Park	3:09	1,043
2	September 13	Quebec Capitales 7, Rockland Boulders 2	Palisades Credit Union Park	2:51	1,006
3	September 14	Rockland Boulders 3, Quebec Capitales 9	Stade Canac	3:17	4,607

== Attendance ==
2017 Can-Am League attendance
Team	Total attendance	Average attendance
Rockland Boulders	145,005	2,843
Québec Capitales	141,923	2,838
Ottawa Champions	92,654	1,971
New Jersey Jackals	91,892	1,767
Trois-Rivières Aigles	79,228	1,617
Sussex County Miners	80,442	1,609
