= 2014 Can-Am League season =

2014 Can-Am League Season
- League: Canadian American Association of Professional Baseball
- Sport: Baseball
- Duration: May 22 – September 2, 2014
- Games: 96
- Teams: 4

Regular season
- Season champions: Rockland Boulders
- Finals champions: Rockland Boulders
- Runners-up: New Jersey Jackals

Can-Am seasons
- 2013 2015

The 2014 Canadian American Association of Professional Baseball season was the league's 10th season of operations. Following the regular season, the playoffs were held. The Rockland Boulders captured their first championship title in just their fourth season, in the sixth game on September 8, 2014, over their rivals, the New Jersey Jackals. Since there were only four teams in the league, the top two teams made it to the playoffs for a single championship round.

== Season summary ==
Even though there were only four teams in the Can-Am League that season, some teams from the American Association of Independent Professional Baseball visited the Can-Am teams during regular season play.

On July 7, 2014, Boulders Outfielder Jerod Edmondson singled off Ryan Bollinger of the Trois-Rivieres Aigles in the top of the fourth inning at Trois-Rivières, breaking the all-time Can-Am League record for career hits. His 700th career hit broke the record previously held by then-current Toronto Blue Jays outfielder Chris Colabello.

Also, on July 7, Jackals manager Joe Calfapietra recorded his 700th managerial win, a 4-3 victory over the Quebec Capitales at Le Stade Municipal.

== Standings ==
Team	W	L	Pct.	GB
Rockland Boulders	56	40	.583	–
New Jersey Jackals	55	41	.573	1
Quebec Capitales	46	50	.479	10
Trois-Rivières Aigles	37	59	.385	19

== Playoffs ==
=== Championship finals ===
==== Rockland vs. New Jersey ====
Rockland won the series, 4-2.

Game	Date	Score	Location	Time	Attendance
1	September 3	Rockland Boulders 2, New Jersey Jackals 3	Yogi Berra Stadium	2:48	772
2	September 4	Rockland Boulders 2, New Jersey Jackals 3	Yogi Berra Stadium	2:40	974
3	September 5	New Jersey Jackals 4, Rockland Boulders 5	Provident Bank Park	2:59	2,882
4	September 6	New Jersey Jackals 4, Rockland Boulders 8	Provident Bank Park	3:58	3,020
5	September 7	New Jersey Jackals 4, Rockland Boulders 14	Provident Bank Park	2:54	2,659
6	September 8	Rockland Boulders 4, New Jersey Jackals 0	Yogi Berra Stadium	2:52	932

== Attendance ==
2014 Can-Am League attendance
Team	Total attendance	Average attendance
Rockland Boulders	146,383	3,182
Québec Capitales	121,305	2,888
New Jersey Jackals	76,423	1,661
Trois-Rivières Aigles	72,543	1,612
