= Trois-Rivières Aigles =

Trois-Rivières Aigles may refer to:

- Trois-Rivières Aigles (1971–1977), Canadian Minor League Baseball team in the Eastern League
- Trois-Rivières Aigles (2013), Canadian professional baseball team in the Frontier League, named after the former team
