= 2020 Can-Am League season =

2020 Can-Am League Season
- League: Canadian American Association of Professional Baseball
- Sport: Baseball
- Teams: 14

Regular season

Can-Am seasons
- 2019

The 2020 Canadian American Association of Professional Baseball season was supposed to begin on May 14, 2020, but the season was suspended due to the COVID-19 pandemic in the United States. This would have been the league's 16th season of operations. Following the 2019 season, the Frontier League merged with the Can-Am League, absorbing five of its teams to make a total of 14 teams.
