= Andrew Chin =

American baseball player (born 1992)

- Pitcher
- Born: September 22, 1992 (age 33); Newton, Massachusetts, U.S.
- Bats: Left Throws: Left
- Stats at Baseball Reference

Andrew Chin (born September 22, 1992) is an American former professional baseball pitcher. He was drafted by the New York Yankees in the 15th round of the 2014 Major League Baseball draft.

== Career ==
=== Amateur ===
Chin attended Buckingham Browne & Nichols in Cambridge, Massachusetts, where he was drafted in the 5th round (169th overall) by the Toronto Blue Jays in the 2011 MLB Draft. Chin committed to Boston College, where he pitched for the Boston College Eagles baseball team. He missed the 2012 season due to Tommy John surgery. In 2014, he pitched for the Chatham Anglers of the Cape Cod Baseball League.

=== New York Yankees ===
The New York Yankees selected Chin in the 15th round of the 2014 MLB draft. He made his professional debut with the rookie-level GCL Yankees, and also played for the Low-A Staten Island Yankees, posting a cumulative 5.27 ERA in 7 games. He returned to the GCL Yankees in 2015, and recorded a 2.92 ERA in 14 appearances. On March 21, 2016, Chin was released by the Yankees organization.

=== Trois-Rivières Aigles ===
On March 24, 2017, Chin signed with the Trois-Rivières Aigles of the Can-Am League. On June 1, Chin was released by Trois-Rivières after struggling to an 18.00 ERA in 3 appearances.

=== San Rafael Pacifics ===
Chin joined the San Rafael Pacifics of the Pacific Association for the 2019 season. In 13 games with the team, Chin recorded a 4-1 record and 1.86 ERA with 44 strikeouts in 38.2 innings of work. At the time of his signing with Sioux City, he was the Pacific Associations's ERA leader.

=== Sioux City Explorers ===
On July 21, 2019, Chin signed with the Sioux City Explorers of the American Association of Independent Professional Baseball. He was released by the team on August 14 after struggling to a 7.30 ERA in 4 games.

== International career ==
Chin played for the Chinese national baseball team in the 2017 World Baseball Classic.
