= Pete Laforest =

Canadian baseball player and manager (born 1978)

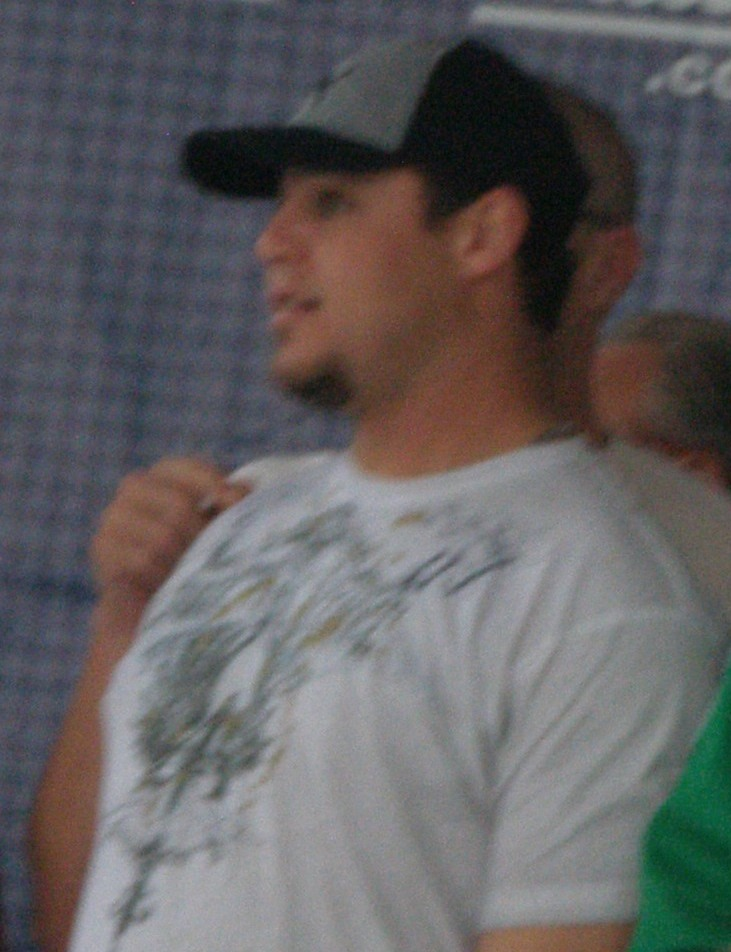
- Laforest in 2007
- Catcher
- Born: January 27, 1978 (age 48); Hull, Quebec, Canada
- Batted: Left Threw: Right

MLB debut
- September 2, 2003, for the Tampa Bay Devil Rays

Last MLB appearance
- September 27, 2007, for the Philadelphia Phillies

MLB statistics
- Batting average: .196
- Home runs: 2
- Runs batted in: 14
- Stats at Baseball Reference

Teams
- Tampa Bay Devil Rays (2003, 2005); San Diego Padres (2007); Philadelphia Phillies (2007)

Pierre-Luc "Pete" Laforest (born January 27, 1978) is a Canadian former professional baseball catcher and was the first manager of the Trois-Rivières Aigles.

== Career ==
Laforest is a graduate of Fort Scott Community College. He was a draft pick of the Montreal Expos, but has also played for the Tampa Bay Devil Rays, the San Diego Padres, and the Philadelphia Phillies.

In 2003, Laforest missed spring training and the first month of the season due to visa problems. Since 1997, he had improperly used a student visa to enter the United States, and in the wake of the September 11 terrorist attacks he was denied entry to the country until an FBI background check had been completed.

Laforest did not speak English until moving to the United States to attend community college, as he was raised in Quebec where the main language is French.

In winter 2007/08, Laforest played for the Mexicali Eagles in the Mexican Pacific League. In February 2009, he signed a minor league contract with the Florida Marlins, but was released during training camp. He then signed a contract with the Rojos del Águila de Veracruz a AAA-level team in the Mexican League. In May of the same year, he joined the Capitales de Québec, an independent team in his home province of Quebec.

In 2013, he was hired as the manager of the Trois-Rivières Aigles in the Canadian American Association of Professional Baseball. Laforest was fired on July 11, 2016, and replaced by batting coach Maxime Poulin. He is now owner of B45 Baseball Academy in Kalamazoo, Michigan.

== International career ==
He was part of Team Canada at the 2004 Summer Olympics and 2006 World Baseball Classic.
