= Trois-Rivières Aigles (1971–1977) =

- 1971–1977; Trois-Rivières, Quebec

Minor league affiliations
- Class: Double-A
- League: Eastern League

Major league affiliations
- Previous teams: Cincinnati Reds

Minor league titles
- League titles (0): None
- Division titles (4): 1971; 1972; 1976; 1977

Team data
- Name: Trois-Rivières Aigles
- Colors: Red, white
- Ballpark: Stade Municipal de Trois-Rivières

The Aigles de Trois-Rivières (English: Trois-Rivières Eagles) were a Canadian Minor League Baseball team of the Eastern League and the Double-A affiliate of the Cincinnati Reds from 1971 to 1977. They were located in Trois-Rivières, Quebec, and played their home games at Stade Municipal de Trois-Rivières.

== History ==
The city of Trois-Rivières was previously represented in Minor League Baseball by the Trois-Rivières Royals in the Provincial League and the Canadian–American League off-and-on from 1939 to 1955.

The Eagles were created as an expansion team of the Double-A Eastern League in 1971, along with the Québec Carnavals, as the league grew from six teams to eight. They played their home games at Stade Municipal de Trois-Rivières. The Cincinnati Reds moved their Double-A affiliation to Trois-Rivières from the Southern League's Asheville Tourists. During their seven-year partnership, the Eagles were supplied with multiple future major leaguers by the Reds, then one of the premier powers in baseball known as the "Big Red Machine".

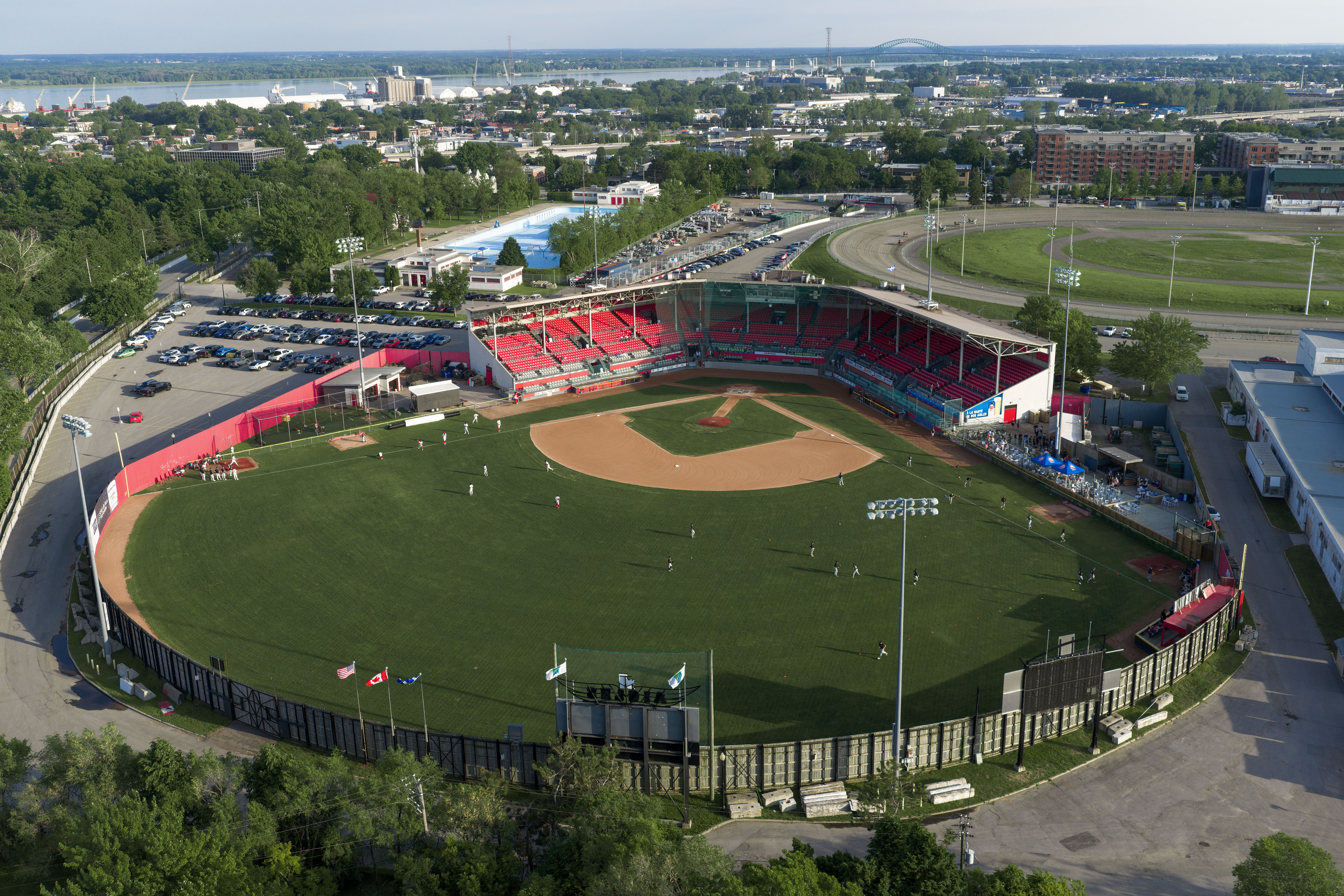
The Eagles played their home games at Stade Municipal de Trois-Rivières.

The Eagles' first club, managed by Jim Snyder, won the 1971 National Division title with a 78–59 record before falling to the Elmira Royals, 3–1, in the playoffs. Snyder was recognized as the Eastern League Manager of the Year and outfielder Gene Locklear was selected for the Eastern League Most Valuable Player Award. The team led the league in attendance with 109,436 people in their inaugural season. They captured a second division title in 1972 (76–60), but again fell in the postseason, this time 3–0 to the West Haven Yankees. They had the second-highest attendance (119,751) behind Québec.

The 1973 team finished in third place at 67–72, 9 1/2 games out of first, but still drew the second-highest attendance in the league. The 1974 Eagles finished fourth (last) in the division with a 65–73 record, but had the highest attendance (84,843). In 1975, Ron Plaza replaced Snyder as manager during the season. The team set a franchise-low 57–80 mark, 27 games out of first. Attendance suffered as well, as they dropped to fourth.

New manager Roy Majtyka led the Eagles to win the 1976 Northern Division title (83–55), but they were swept 3–0 by West Haven in the playoffs. Majtyka was the league's Manager of the Year. Their attendance was a third-best 62,655. Chuck Goggin managed the 1977 club to win the Canadian-American Division title with a 76–62 record in their final year. As in the previous postseason, West Haven defeated them in the championship playoffs, 3–0. First baseman Harry Spilman won the Eastern League MVP Award. The Eagles' attendance had dropped to a seventh-place 52,927.

In 1978, the Eastern League shed both the Eagles and the renamed Québec Métros as it shrank back to six teams. The Reds moved their Double-A affiliation back to the Southern League, partnering with the expansion Nashville Sounds.

The city of Trois-Rivières was later represented by the Aigles de Trois-Rivières, a summer amateur-league team in the Ligue de Baseball Élite du Québec and the Trois-Rivières Aigles of the independent Frontier League.

== Season-by-season record ==
Season	PDC	Division	Finish	Wins	Losses	Win%	Postseason	Manager	Attendance
Trois-Rivières Aigles
1971	CIN	National	1st	78	59	.569	Lost to Elmira in championship series 3-1	Jim Snyder	109,346
1972	CIN	National	1st	76	60	.559	Lost to West Haven in championship series 3-0	Jim Snyder	119,751
1973	CIN	National	3rd	67	72	.482		Jim Snyder	90,565
1974	CIN	National	4th	65	73	.471		Jim Snyder	84,843
1975	CIN		8th	57	80	.416		Jim Snyder	54,436
1976	CIN	North	1st	83	55	.601	Lost to West Haven in championship series 3-0	Roy Majtyka	62,655
1977	CIN	Canadian-American	1st	76	62	.551	Lost to West Haven in championship series 3-0	Chuck Goggin	52,927

Division winner	League champions

== Notable alumni ==
- Santo Alcalá
- Joaquín Andújar
- Bill Caudill
- Doug Corbett
- Dan Driessen
- Rawly Eastwick
- Doug Flynn
- Ken Griffey, Sr.
- Steve Henderson
- Tom Hume
- Ray Knight
- Mike LaCoss
- Will McEnaney
- Harry Spilman
- Pat Zachry

Preceded by Asheville Tourists	Cincinnati Reds; Double-A affiliate 1971–1977	Succeeded by Nashville Sounds
