= Sebastien Boucher =

Canadian baseball player (born 1981)

Sébastien Boucher
- Outfielder
- Born: October 19, 1981 (age 44); Gatineau, Quebec, Canada
- Bats: Left Throws: Right
- Stats at Baseball Reference

Sébastien Boucher (born October 19, 1981) is a Canadian former professional baseball outfielder.

== Career ==
Boucher played college baseball for the Bethune–Cookman Wildcats. In 2004, he was named the Mid-Eastern Athletic Conference Player of the Year. In 2021, on the occasion of the conference's fiftieth anniversary, he was named to the MEAC All-Time Baseball Team.

Boucher was originally drafted by the Seattle Mariners in the 7th round (213th overall) in the 2004 Major League Baseball draft from Bethune–Cookman.

On August 9, 2007, Boucher was traded to the Baltimore Orioles in exchange for LHP John Parrish.

He moved on to independent baseball, playing with the Québec Capitales in the Can-Am League where he won the batting title in 2014.

Boucher then played with the Ottawa Champions, another team in the Can-Am League and played from 2015 to 2018. He then became the team’s manager in 2019.

== International career ==
Boucher also played for the Canadian national team at the 2006 World Baseball Classic.
