= Harry Spilman =

American baseball player (born 1954)

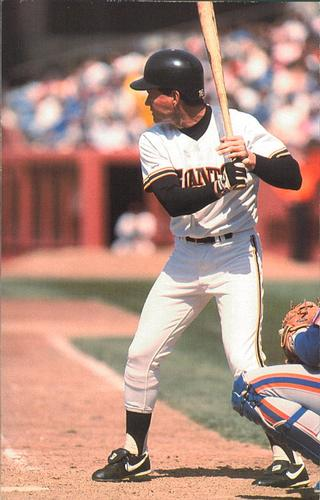
- First baseman
- Born: July 18, 1954 (age 72); Albany, Georgia, U.S.
- Batted: Left Threw: Right

MLB debut
- September 11, 1978, for the Cincinnati Reds

Last MLB appearance
- September 30, 1989, for the Houston Astros

MLB statistics
- Batting average: .237
- Home runs: 18
- Runs batted in: 117
- Stats at Baseball Reference

Teams
- Cincinnati Reds (1978–1981); Houston Astros (1981–1985); Detroit Tigers (1986); San Francisco Giants (1986–1988); Houston Astros (1988–1989)

William Harry Spilman (born July 18, 1954) is an American former professional baseball first baseman. He played in Major League Baseball (MLB) for the Cincinnati Reds (1978–81), Houston Astros (1981–85, 1988–89), Detroit Tigers (1986), and San Francisco Giants (1986–88). He was also known for his skill as a pinch hitter. He currently coaches in the Kansas City Royals feeder system, as a scout. He previously worked for the Texas Rangers and the Houston Astros.

== Playing career ==
No one drafted Spilman in the 1974 Major League Baseball draft, and he attended several tryouts with teams before Bill Jameson signed him to a contract with the Cincinnati Reds. In 1977 with the Trois-Rivières Aigles, he won the Eastern League batting title with a .373 average, accruing 184 hits in only 133 games. His average hovered over .400 most of the season and was the highest for a Class AA team in 15 years. By 1978, he was considered one of the Reds' top-hitting prospects. With Dan Driessen playing first base for the Reds, the team moved Spilman to third in spring training to compete for a backup infielder spot on the roster. Spilman ultimately didn't make the team and spent most of 1978 playing for the Class AAA Indianapolis Indians of the American Association, where he batted .295 with 144 hits, 13 home runs, and 79 RBI. The Reds called him up in September, and he made his major league debut September 11, pinch-hitting in a 9-8 victory over the Houston Astros. Ultimately, Spilman appeared in four games in his first major league season.

He helped the Reds win the NL Western Division in 1979 and 1981 and the Giants win the NL Western Division in 1987.

== Career statistics ==
In 12 seasons, he played in 563 games, with 392 of those appearances as a pinch hitter. His career totals in 810 at bats consisted of a triple split of 237/306/348, with 96 runs, 192 hits, 18 home runs, and 117 RBI. Spillman was almost exclusively used versus right-handed pitching, as noted by 91% of his plate appearances occurring versus them compared to 9% against left-handed pitchers.

While Spilman played first base and third base exclusively in the minor leagues, he had 23 appearances in the majors as an emergency/3rd catcher.

== Coaching career ==
From 2007 to 2008, he served as hitting coach for the Triple-A Nashville Sounds.

== Personal life ==
His cousin is former White Sox first baseman, Greg Walker. Spilman is best friends with Ray Knight, former teammate on the Reds. The two grew up 20 miles from each other and spent $700 on a pitching machine to work on their hitting while in the Reds' system.
