= Trois-Rivières Saints =

Logo
Cap insignia

Information
- League: Canadian Baseball League
- Location: Trois-Rivières, Quebec
- Ballpark: Stade Municipal
- Founded: 2003
- League championships: 0
- Division championships: 0
- Former name(s): Trois-Rivières Saints (2003)
- Colours: Black, Orange, Gold
- Manager: Dan Norman and coaches: Dom Dinelle, Gil Rondon

The Trois-Rivières Saints were a minor league baseball team located in Trois-Rivières, Quebec. The team played in the Canadian Baseball League. Their home stadium was Stade Municipal.
