= Jesen Therrien =

Canadian baseball player (born 1993)

Trois-Rivières Aigles – No. 13
- Pitcher
- Born: March 18, 1993 (age 33); Montreal, Quebec, Canada
- Bats: Right Throws: Right

MLB debut
- July 29, 2017, for the Philadelphia Philles

MLB statistics (through 2017 season)
- Win–loss record: 0–0
- Earned run average: 8.35
- Strikeouts: 10
- Stats at Baseball Reference

Teams
- Philadelphia Phillies (2017)

Jesen Dygestile-Therrien (born March 18, 1993) is a Canadian professional baseball pitcher for the Trois-Rivières Aigles of the Frontier League. He has previously played in Major League Baseball (MLB) for the Philadelphia Phillies.

== Career ==
Therrien played college baseball at Ahuntsic College in Québec City, Canada.

=== Philadelphia Phillies ===
Therrien was drafted by the New York Mets in 36th round, with the 1,082nd overall selection, of the 2010 Major League Baseball draft, but did not sign. He was then drafted by the Philadelphia Phillies in the 17th round, with the 541st overall selection, of the 2011 Major League Baseball draft and signed.

He made his professional debut in 2012 with the rookie-level Gulf Coast Phillies, posting a 3.46 ERA in 12 games. He returned to the GCL Phillies the following year, registering a 2–3 record and 5.45 ERA with 26 strikeouts across 11 games (6 starts). In 2014, he split time between the Low-A Williamsport Crosscutters and Single-A Lakewood BlueClaws. In 35 total games, Therrien posted a 4–1 record and 5.58 ERA with 54 strikeouts and 3 saves in 71.0 innings pitched.

Therrien made 39 appearances in 2015, spending time with Lakewood and the High-A Clearwater Threshers. In 63.0 innings pitched, he recorded a 5–0 record and 1.43 ERA with 54 strikeouts and 5 saves. He split the 2016 season between Clearwater and the Double-A Reading Fightin Phils, posting a cumulative 3–3 record and 2.59 ERA with 76 strikeouts and 5 saves in 55.2 innings of work across 39 appearances. Therrien began the 2017 season with Reading, and was promoted to the Triple-A Lehigh Valley IronPigs after logging a 1.26 ERA with 7 saves in 21 games.

On July 28, 2017, the Phillies promoted Therrien to the major leagues. He made his MLB debut the following day against the Atlanta Braves surrendering a double and then retiring the next 3 batters. He made 15 appearances for the Phillies, recording a 8.35 ERA with 10 strikeouts in 18.1 innings pitched. On September 21, 2017, Therrien underwent Tommy John surgery, ending his season and wiping him out for the 2018 season as well. On November 6, Therrien was removed from the 40-man roster and sent outright to Lehigh Valley, however he rejected the assignment and elected free agency.

=== Los Angeles Dodgers ===
On November 24, 2017, Therrien signed a two-year minor league contract with the Los Angeles Dodgers organization. He did not play during the 2018 season while recovering from his surgery. Therrien was invited to Spring Training with the Dodgers in 2019, and was assigned to the Triple-A Oklahoma City Dodgers and placed on the injured list to begin the year. He did not play in a game for the organization and elected free agency following the season on November 4, 2019.

=== Trois-Rivières Aigles ===
On May 8, 2023, after several years of inactivity, Therrien signed with the Trois-Rivières Aigles of the Frontier League. In 10 games for the Aigles, Therrien struggled immensely to a 12.10 ERA with 13 strikeouts in 9 2/3 innings pitched. On June 27, Therrien was released by the Aigles.

On May 1, 2024, Therrien re-signed with the Aigles. In 18 starts for Trois-Rivières, he posted a 6-6 record and 4.17 ERA with 118 strikeouts over 108 innings of work.

On April 19, 2025, Therrien re-signed with the Aigles for his third consecutive season with the team.

== International career ==
Therrien was selected as a member of the Canada national baseball team at the 2017 World Baseball Classic.
