= Salina Stockade =

- Salina, Kansas

Site information
- Type: U.S. Army post, local militia post
- Controlled by: various Army units from Kansas, local militia

Location
- Coordinates: 38.8407°N 97.6101°W

Site history
- Built: May—June 1864
- In use: May 1864—June 1865
- Materials: wood

Garrison information
- Past commanders: various, including Lieut. John M. Clark, Capt. Henry Booth, First Lieut. Jacob Van Antwerp, Capt. Elisha Hammer
- Garrison: same

The Salina Stockade was built in Salina, Kansas, to provide the residents with protection from the American Indians in the area, many of whom were hostile toward white settlement. Salina had been raided in 1862 by Native Americans and then Confederate guerrillas, but it was not until May 1864 when residents decided they needed to build a stockade for protection. On May 17, 1864, a makeshift stockade, consisting of wagons placed in a circle around the town's flagpole, was erected. The local militia then drilled and guarded Salina. On the northeast corner of 7th Street and Iron Avenue stood a small building. Around this a permanent stockade was erected in May and June 1864.

== History ==
The stockade, measuring 100 feet (30 m) by 125 feet (38 m), was started on May 29, 1864. It consisted of logs set upright on end in an oval. They were 18 feet (5.5 m) long and the ends were buried 3 feet (0.91 m) into the ground. Portholes were cut out at short distances around the stockade to allow men to shoot through them at anyone attacking the stockade. A heavy gate was placed at the southeast corner of the stockade. The construction was completed June 8.

In June 1864, just after the completion of the stockade, the commander of Fort Riley sent twenty-five troops, commanded by Lieut. John M. Clark, to garrison the stockade. In July Capt. Henry Booth became the commander in Salina and he brought one artillery piece with him. While Booth was at Salina, he was involved in helping area settlers and friendly Indians in their conflicts with Indians opposed to white settlers. Conflicts in the area with certain Indian groups remained until at least the end of the Civil War. From October 1864 to at least March 1865, Capt. Elisha Hammer commanded Salina's post.

Meanwhile, the building inside the stockade was remodeled and in September 1864 was opened as Salina's first public school. The school term ran until March 1865. The use of the building probably continued until at least June 1865.

Troops were stationed at Salina until March 1865, when apparently they were removed. On June 20, 1865, an order was issued to place a company of troops from the 15th Kansas Cavalry at Salina, but there is no confirmation that this was done.

== See also ==
- Whiteford (Price) Archeological Site
