= Stade Quillorama =

Baseball stadium in Trois-Rivières, Quebec

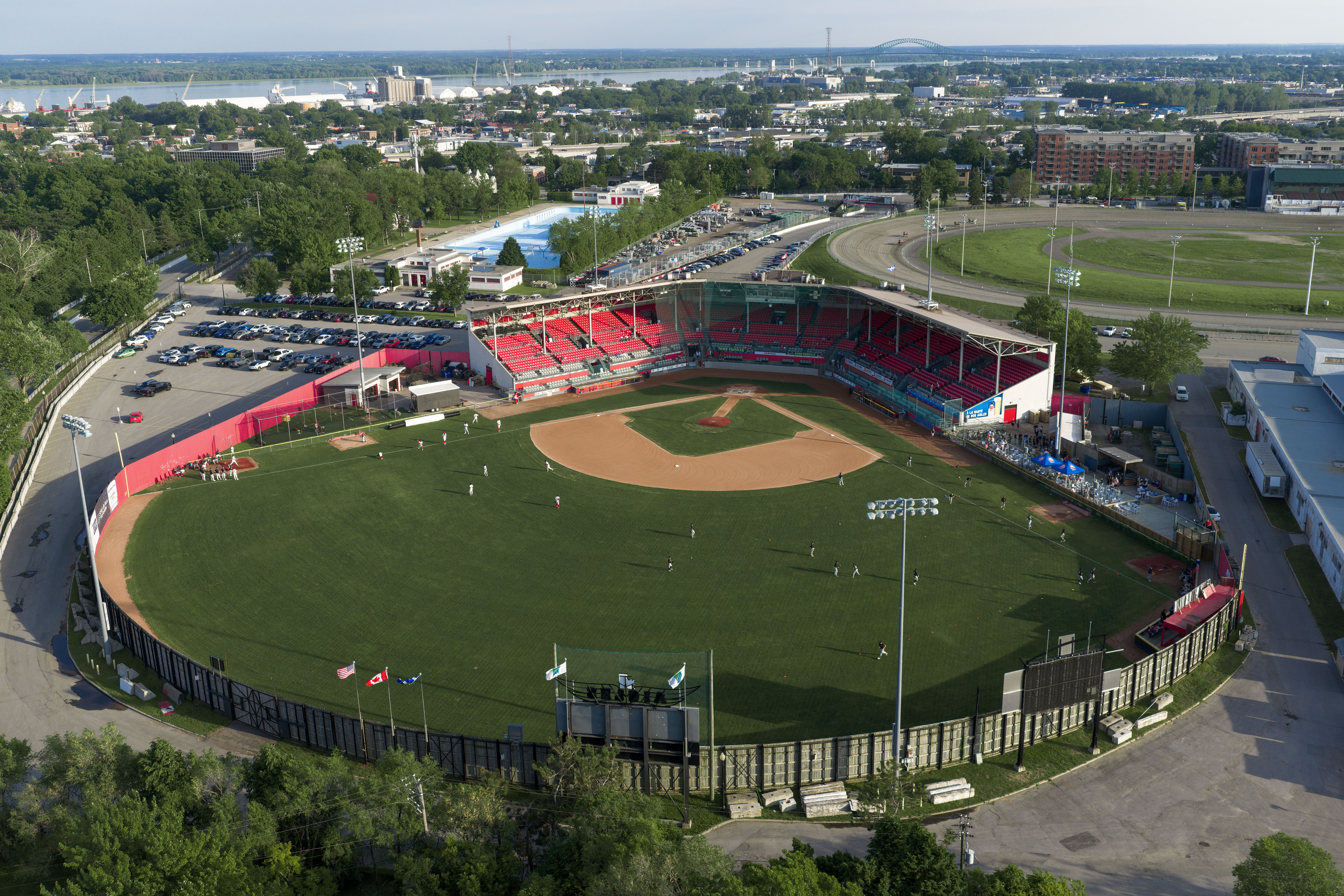
- Interactive map of Stade Quillorama
- Former names: Stade Municipal de Trois-Rivières (1938–2000); Stade Fernand-Bédard (2001–2016); Stade Stéréo Plus (2017–2019)
- Address: 1760 avenue Gilles-Villeneuve
- Location: Trois-Rivières, Quebec, Canada
- Coordinates: 46°20′52″N 72°33′23″W
- Owner: City of Trois-Rivières
- Operator: Quillorama
- Capacity: 4,000 (1938–2009); 3,700 (2009–present) (4,200 with outdoor patio)
- Surface: Grass
- Record attendance: Baseball: 6,022 (August 28, 2015); Concerts: 15,000 (2009 Cirque du Soleil)
- Field size: Left field: 303 ft (92 m); Centre field: 372 ft (113 m); Right field: 317 ft (97 m)

Construction
- Opened: 1938
- Renovated: 2009, 2019

Tenants
- Trois-Rivières Aigles (NAPB) 2013–present Trois-Rivières Jr. Aigles (LBJEQ) 1971–present Trois-Rivières Saints (CBL) 2003; Trois-Rivières Aigles (EL) 1971–77; Trois-Rivières Royals (Can-Am) 1941–42, 1946–50; Trois-Rivières Royals (QPL) 1940

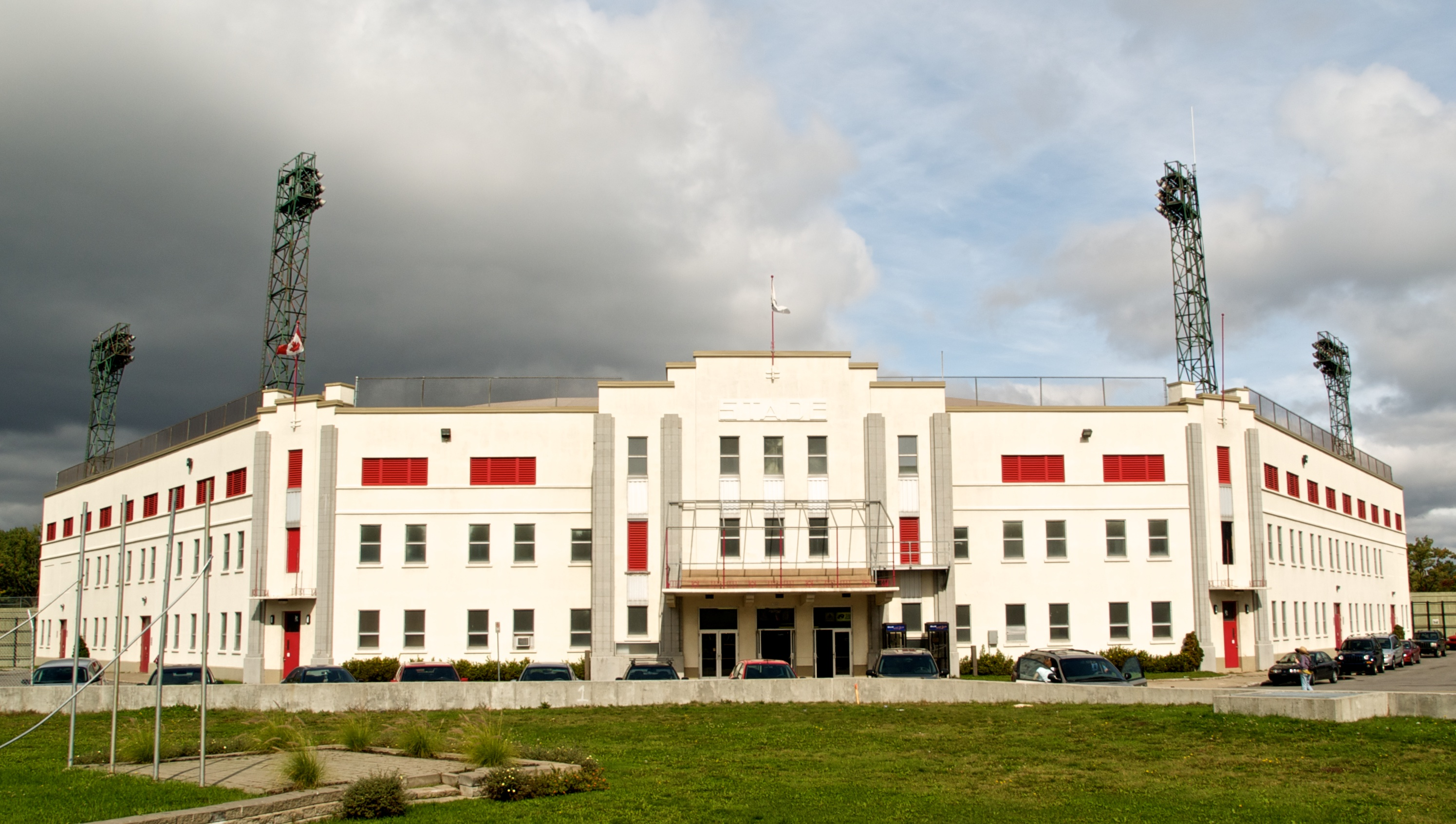
Exterior in 2008

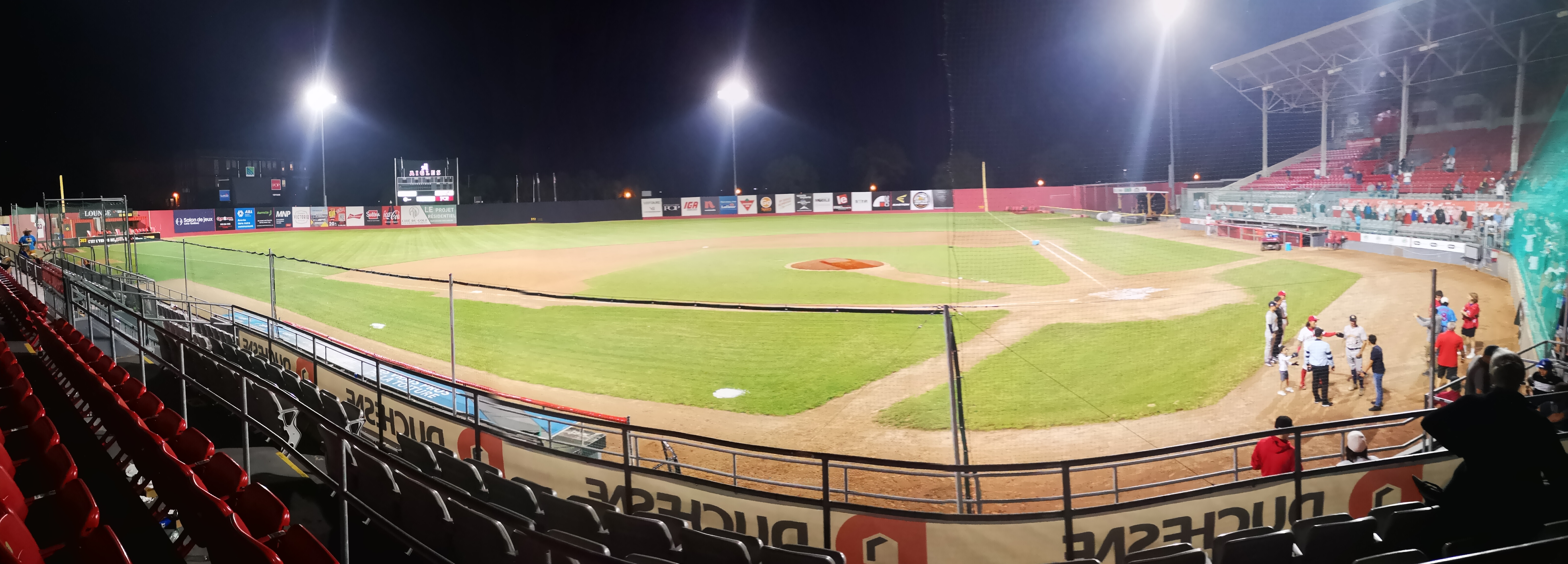
A panoramic view of Stade Quillorama in 2024

Stade Quillorama is a baseball stadium in Trois-Rivières, Quebec, Canada. It is primarily used for baseball, and is the home of the Trois-Rivières Aigles of the National Association of Professional Baseball (NAPB). The ballpark has a seating capacity of 3,700 people, plus an outdoor patio which accommodates an additional 500 people, bringing the total capacity to 4,200.

== History ==
The stadium was built in 1938. It was previously the home of the original Trois-Rivières Aigles, operating in the Eastern League from 1971 to 1977. It was then the home of the Trois-Rivières Saints of the Canadian Baseball League in 2003.

In 1971, a major junior baseball team started playing at the stadium, the Trois-Rivières Jr. Aigles, who plays in the Ligue de Baseball Junior Élite du Québec (LBJEQ).

In 2012, the Can-Am League expanded to Trois-Rivières. The new team, the Trois-Rivières Aigles, began to play at the stadium in 2013. The team currently plays in the Frontier League at its 11th season of existence.

On August 28, 2015, a stadium record crowd of 6,022 invaded the Fernand-Bédard Stadium as former Major League Baseball pitcher Éric Gagné, was the starting pitcher for one game in a Aigles uniform. The Aigles were able to pull a 5–3 win against their provincial rival Québec Capitales.

== Naming ==
The stadium was originally named as Stade Municipal de Trois-Rivières from 1938 to 2001. The name then changed to Stade Fernand-Bédard, and then to Stade Stéréo Plus in December 2016. The change to Stade Quillorama was announced in December 2019. Quillorama is a large bowling centre in the province of Quebec.
