= Can–Am League =

North America baseball league, 2005–2019

Canadian American Association of Professional Baseball
- Most recent season or competition: 2019 Can-Am League season
- Can-Am League logo
- Classification: Independent baseball
- Sport: Baseball
- Founded: 2005
- Folded: 2019
- No. of teams: 6
- Countries: United States (3 teams); Canada (3 teams)
- Headquarters: Dayton, Ohio
- Last champion: New Jersey Jackals (2019)
- Most titles: Québec Capitales (7)
- Broadcasters: RDS, TVA Sports

The Canadian American Association of Professional Baseball, commonly known as the Can-Am League, was a professional baseball league with teams in Eastern Canada and Northeastern United States. Founded in 2005 in Dayton, Ohio, the league was formed as a reorganization of the Northeast League following the 2004 season.

The Can-Am League operated in cities not directly served by Major or Minor League teams and was not affiliated with either. Though a separate entity, the league shared a commissioner, president, and director of umpires with the American Association of Professional Baseball. The league was headquartered in Dayton, Ohio.

The league ceased operations after the 2019 season, with five of the remaining six teams joining the Frontier League.

== History ==
The Can-Am League was created when the Northeast League was renamed in 2005. The Northeast League was formed in 1995 and played four seasons as an independent baseball league. At the end of the 1998 season, the Northeast League was merged with the Northern League and became that league's East Division. Although the East Division did not play the teams that were already in the Northern League during the regular season, the respective divisions played each other in an all-star game every summer and in a league championship series every fall from 1999 until 2002. The Northeast League became its own entity again for the 2003 season and continued play for one additional year before the renaming of the league.

The Allentown Ambassadors folded days before the 2004 season began, forcing the Northeast League to field a traveling team called the Aces. For the 2005 season, the Northeast League accepted the Worcester Tornadoes as a new eighth team. However, three weeks before the start of the 2005 season, the Bangor Lumberjacks folded, forcing the team to create another traveling team, this time called The Grays.

The league operated a traveling team whenever necessary to provide an even number of teams. However, doing so forced the other franchises to host more home games to provide a season of the same length. To obviate such disruptive last-minute schedule changes in the future, the Northeast League adopted a new charter, giving the league new powers to ensure that its franchises were solvent, and renamed itself the Canadian-American Association.

For 2006, the Can-Am League added two teams. Floyd Hall Enterprises, which owned the Jackals, decided to launch a second team after the New Jersey Cardinals franchise was relocated and founded the Sussex Skyhawks. The Skyhawks took the place of the Elmira Pioneers, which moved into the amateur New York Collegiate Baseball League. The league also received a new member from the Atlantic League of Professional Baseball, as the Nashua Pride joined as the eighth team.

Another Atlantic League team defected to the Can-Am League for 2007 as the Atlantic City Surf joined. To even out the teams, The Grays were relaunched to serve as the traveling team.

After the 2007 season, the New Haven County Cutters and North Shore Spirit ceased operations.

For 2008, Ottawa, which had lost its franchise in the International League, joined the Can-Am League as the Rapidz, an eighth franchise, displacing the Grays.

After the 2008 season, Rapidz management declared bankruptcy. The league declared its intention to operate the Ottawa franchise in 2009. The league changed the team's name back to Rapids, a spelling used during the team's founding (Rapides in French). Later, however, the Commissioner stated the need for a "fresh start" and opened a contest to select a new name for the team. The winning name was "Voyageurs".

Still later, the Atlantic City franchise was terminated, as a sale fell through. On March 30, 2009, the league announced that it would shrink to six teams rather than having two league-operated teams.

The Nashua Pride franchise was sold and was known in 2009 as the American Defenders of New Hampshire because of the military tie-ins of its new ownership group. During the 2009 season the Defenders were locked out of Holman Stadium and forced to play their last home games on the road, bringing doubt to the future of baseball in Nashua. The Québec Capitales would go on to win their second League Championship.

On December 19, 2009, league directors preliminarily gave approval to transfer the membership of the American Defenders of New Hampshire from Nashua, New Hampshire, to Pittsfield, Massachusetts for play in the 2010 season. Final approval was granted by the city for use of Wahconah Park on February 1. The ownership group headed by Buddy Lewis had a lease on Wahconah Park for a team in the New England Collegiate Baseball League, and transferred the current lease for play in the Can-Am League. Dan Duquette, current executive vice-president of baseball operations for the Baltimore Orioles, is also part of the ownership group, which is known as Boston Baseball All-Stars LLC. The team was renamed the Pittsfield Colonials.

After the 2010 season, In its place, the league awarded the Rockland Boulders a franchise, added the Newark Bears from the Atlantic League, and formed the New York Federals as a traveling team. Pittsfield's franchise charter was rescinded after the 2011 season and the Colonials folded after ownership could not find partners.

The Brockton Rox moved to the Futures Collegiate Baseball League after the 2011 season. At the end of the 2012 season the Worcester charter was rescinded and the league decided to try to find new owners for the Tornadoes, but failed to do so and awarded the franchise instead to a Trois-Rivières, Quebec, group.

Beginning in 2012, Can-Am League clubs played 18 to 20 games per season against opponents from the American Association of Professional Baseball, with which it shares a commissioner. After the 2013 season, Newark announced it would not compete in the 2014 season and the team was eventually folded altogether.

In 2014, the Can-Am League announced that a fifth team, based in Ottawa, would join the league for 2015. The league later announced it would be returning to Sussex County, New Jersey as well, and announced that a traveling team would join the Ottawa Champions and the Sussex County Miners to create a balanced schedule, and continued to include matchups with the American Association. Interleague play ended after the 2015 season, though the Can-Am League continued to send players to the American Association's All-Star Game.

Starting with the 2015 season, the league hosted international clubs as part of its regular season schedule. Each of the regular clubs of the league played a series of 3 or 4 games against these international teams and the results of those games counted in the regular season standings. Over the years, the league hosted teams from Cuba, Japan and the Dominican Republic.

On October 16, 2019, the Frontier League announced that it was merging with the Can-Am League for the 2020 season. The Jackals, Boulders, Capitales, Miners and Aigles all joined but did not start play until 2021 due to the COVID-19 pandemic causing the league to cancel its 2020 campaign. The Champions were not invited, but the Frontier League eventually granted an Ottawa franchise and that started playing in 2022 as the Ottawa Titans.

== Season structure ==
=== Playoff format ===
In its inaugural season, the Can-Am League kept the two-division setup and half-season format that the Northeast League had. The two teams that were leading their respective divisions, designated North and South, at the end of the first half of the season automatically qualified for the playoffs. Two additional playoff spots would be made available. Once again, these went to division winners if the first half champions failed to repeat. Otherwise, one or more wild card spots would be given based on the team's overall record in both halves. If absolutely necessary, a one-game playoff would be played in case of a tie.

Beginning in 2006, the league abandoned divisional play. The first half-season leader automatically qualified for the playoffs, as did the second half-season leader if there was a second. To round the field out at four, two or more wild-card spots were given to teams with the best overall season record.

The four qualifiers for the playoffs would meet in two separate best of five series with the winners advancing to the League Championship Series, which was also best of five.

Beginning in 2012, the league stopped using the half-season format. From 2012 through 2014, the teams with the two best records in the league advanced to the League Championship Series. The series was expanded from a best of five to a best of seven. This changed in 2015 when Ottawa and Sussex County joined the league, which enabled it to have enough teams to return to its previous playoff format. From this point until its merger with the Frontier League, the league awarded playoff spots to the teams with the four best records at the end of the regular season.

=== Players ===
The league salary cap was a maximum amount that could be spent on the entire player roster. Teams could apportion it among players as they saw fit. Certain players were given coaching duties to earn additional pay.

The maximum salary cap for a rostered player was about US$4,500 every one to two months, depending on the roster size. However most players made about $2–3,000 every month. There were some rostered players that made the maximum every two months. There were no players in the league that made more than $4,500 per month.

Rosters were limited to 23 players once the regular season began. An additional two players could be on the disabled list (which was referred to on some published rosters as the disabled/inactive list, and was sometimes used to ensure that a player under contract that a team does not wish to use was unavailable to opponents). League roster rules gave each player an LS (Length of Service) rating, based on the number of full years the player had played professionally: Rookie, LS-1 through LS-5, and Veteran. Teams could carry at most four veterans and were required to carry at least five rookies. Some published rosters stated the LS rating of each player.

=== Scheduling ===
From 2015 to 2019, all teams played a total of 100 games during the regular season: 50 games each of home and road.

In years when one of the teams was a league-operated traveling team, the franchises played an increased number of home games to keep the total length of the regular season constant. All games a franchise played against the traveling team were played at the franchise's ballpark. However, half of those games were designated "home games" for the traveling team, which took the field first and batted last as though the game were played at the traveling team's "home."

Opponents played a series of from three to five games on consecutive days. Occasionally, for clubs near to one another, the original schedule did not put all the games of a series at the same ballpark. For example, the teams could travel to the visitors' ballpark for the middle game of a series.

== Teams ==
Final team locations

| Team | First season | City | Stadium | Capacity |
|---|---|---|---|---|
| New Jersey Jackals | 1998 | Little Falls, New Jersey | Yogi Berra Stadium | 3,784 |
| Ottawa Champions | 2015 | Ottawa, Ontario | RCGT Park | 10,332 |
| Québec Capitales | 1999 | Quebec City, Quebec | Stade Canac | 4,287 |
| Rockland Boulders | 2011 | Pomona, New York | Palisades Credit Union Park | 7,988 |
| Sussex County Miners | 2015 | Augusta, New Jersey | Skylands Stadium | 4,200 |
| Trois-Rivières Aigles | 2013 | Trois-Rivières, Quebec | Stade Stéréo Plus | 4,000 |

=== League timeline ===
Can-Am League Northeast League Northern League East

== Notable alumni ==
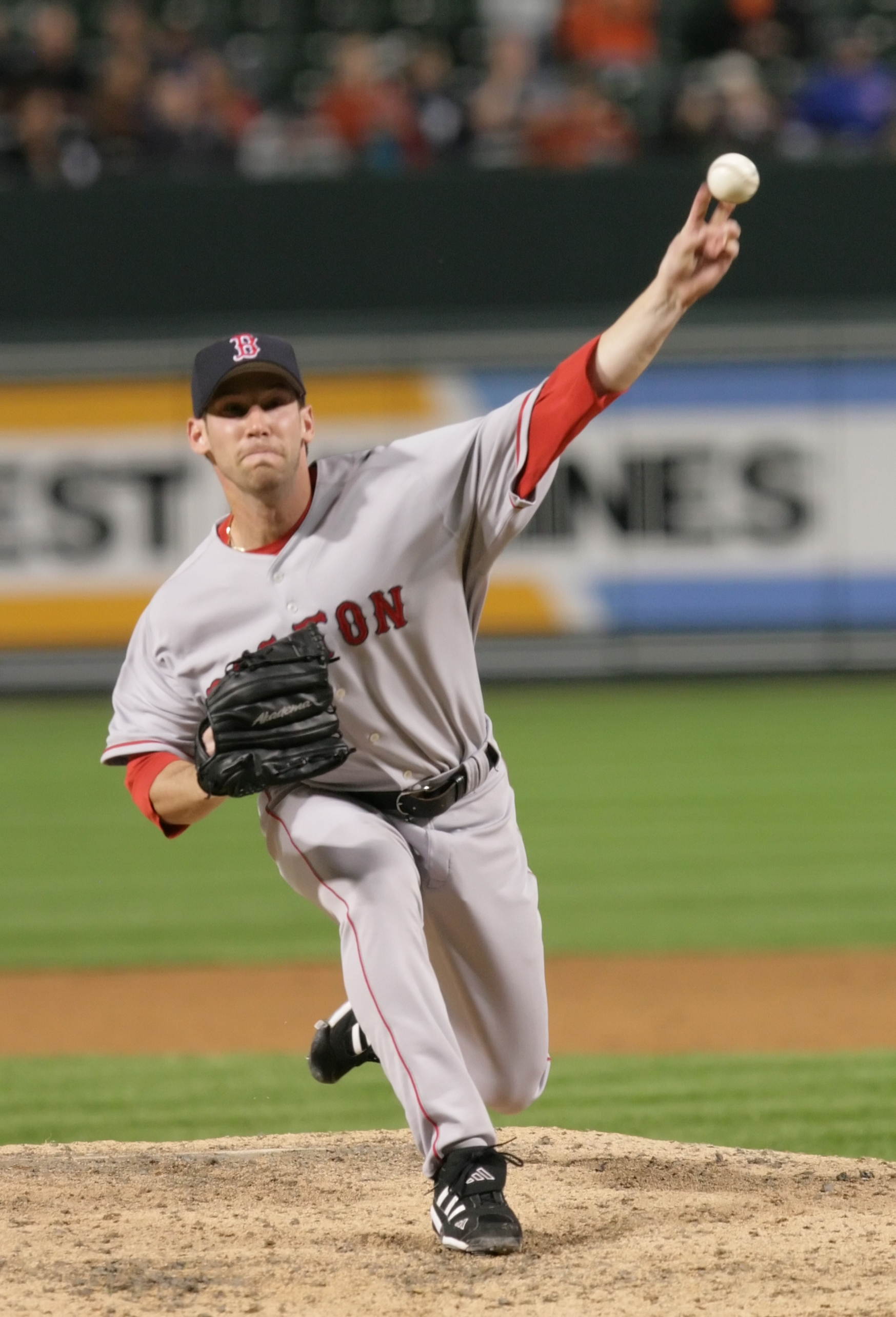
Craig Breslow

- RHP Tim Adleman (New Jersey 2013)
- LHP Andrew Albers (Quebec 2010)
- LHP Craig Breslow (New Jersey 2004)
- OF Stephen Cardullo (Rockland 2013–15)
- OF Chris Colabello (Worcester 2005–11, Nashua 2007)
- RHP Steve Delabar (Brockton 2008–09)
- RHP Wilmer Font (Ottawa 2015–16)
- RHP Luis García (Newark 2012)
- Umpire Adam Hamari (2006)
- RHP Jeff Harris (Quebec 2003–04)
- 1B John Lindsey (New Jersey 2005–06)
- Umpire Will Little (2007)
- RHP Stu Pomeranz (New Jersey 2009)
- RHP Ken Ray (North Shore 2005)
- LHP Raúl Valdés (New Jersey/Nashua 2006)
- RHP Joe Winkelsas (Grays 2005)
- RHP Mat Latos (New Jersey 2018)

== Champions ==
| Season | Winner | Runner-up | Result |
|---|---|---|---|
| 2005 | Worcester Tornadoes | Québec Capitales | 3–0 |
| 2006 | Québec Capitales | Brockton Rox | 3–2 |
| 2007 | Nashua Pride | North Shore Spirit | 3–0 |
| 2008 | Sussex Skyhawks | Québec Capitales | 3–0 |
| 2009 | Québec Capitales | Worcester Tornadoes | 3–1 |
| 2010 | Québec Capitales | Pittsfield Colonials | 3–1 |
| 2011 | Québec Capitales | New Jersey Jackals | 3–1 |
| 2012 | Québec Capitales | New Jersey Jackals | 4–1 |
| 2013 | Québec Capitales | New Jersey Jackals | 4–3 |
| 2014 | Rockland Boulders | New Jersey Jackals | 4–2 |
| 2015 | Trois-Rivières Aigles | New Jersey Jackals | 3–2 |
| 2016 | Ottawa Champions | Rockland Boulders | 3–2 |
| 2017 | Québec Capitales | Rockland Boulders | 3–0 |
| 2018 | Sussex County Miners | Québec Capitales | 3–1 |
| 2019 | New Jersey Jackals | Sussex County Miners | 3–1 |

== See also ==
- U.S. independent professional leagues' awards
