= Ottawa Champions =

Can-Am League baseball team in Ontario

Logo	Cap insignia

Information
- League: Can-Am League
- Location: Ottawa, Ontario
- Ballpark: RCGT Park
- Founded: 2014
- Folded: 2019
- Nickname: Champs
- League championships: 1: (2016)
- Playoff berths: 1 2016
- Colours: Red, blue, white
- Mascot: Champ
- Retired numbers: 18
- Ownership: Miles Wolff
- General manager: Ben Hodge
- Manager: Sébastien Boucher
- Media: Ottawa Citizen, Le Droit, CKDJ-FM
- Website: www.ottawachampions.ca

The Ottawa Champions (French: Champions d'Ottawa), officially Ottawa Champions Baseball Club (Le club de baseball des Champions) and colloquially known as the Champs, were a professional baseball team based in Ottawa. The Champions competed in the Canadian American Association of Professional Baseball (Can-Am League). From 2015 to 2019, the team played its home games at RCGT Park, originally known as JetForm Park. The Champions mascot was Champ.

Founded in 2014, the Champions were one of the last expansion teams in the Can-Am League, along with the Sussex County Miners.

The Champions won the 2016 Can-Am League Championship in their second season in Ottawa, defeating the Rockland Boulders in Game 5 with a final score of 3-1.

== History ==
The City of Ottawa granted a 10-year lease of the Ottawa Baseball Stadium to establish a Can-Am Baseball League team for the 2015 season in September 2013.

In June 2014, the Ottawa Champions team name was announced followed by the unveiling of the team logo that August.

The Champions announced the signing of Hal Lanier as the team’s first on-field manager on 18 November 2014. Lanier is a former Major League Baseball player who began his MLB career in 1964 as a member of the San Francisco Giants; he also spent time as a New York Yankee at the end of his playing career. He worked as a coach for the St. Louis Cardinals and won a World Series with them in 1982. He was the manager of the Houston Astros from 1986 to 1988 and was named the NL Manager of the Year in 1986. He has managed numerous independent league teams before including the Winnipeg Goldeyes and Can-Am team the Sussex Skyhawks. Along with Lanier, the Champions also announced the signing of their first player, Gatineau native outfielder Sébastien Boucher. Boucher was drafted 213th in the 2004 MLB draft and was selected to play for Canada in the World Baseball Classic in 2006. The team's founding president was David Gourlay.

The Champions played their first game in franchise history on 22 May 2015 and won the game 8-1 against the Sussex County Miners in front of a crowd of 3,876.

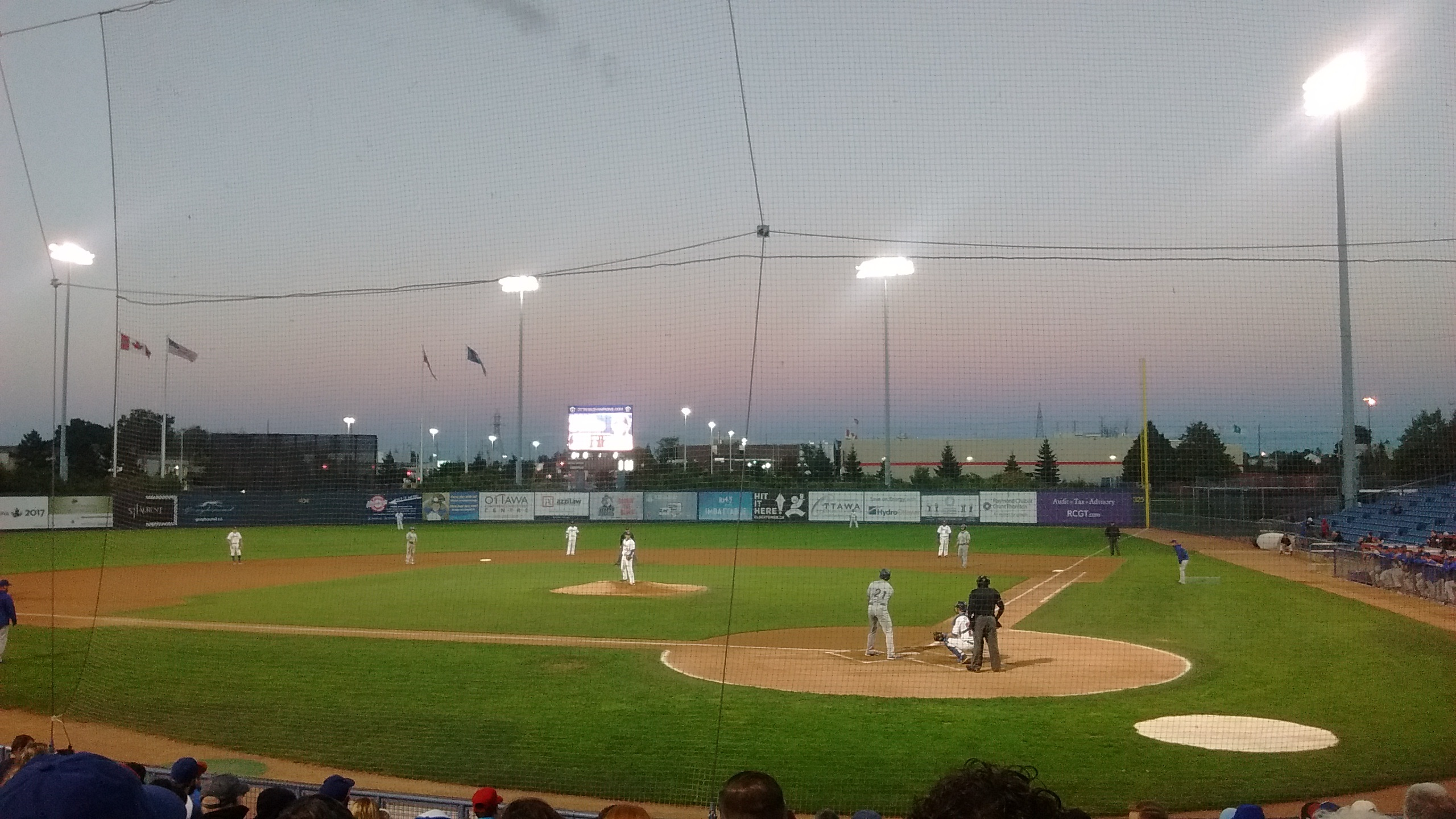
An Ottawa Champions home game in 2016

In the 2016 season, the Champions qualified for the playoffs for the first time in franchise history. In the opening round, the Champions defeated the New Jersey Jackals 3 games to 1 and advanced to Can-Am League Championship Round for the very first time in franchise history. In the championship round, the Champions defeated the Rockland Boulders 3 games to 2 to capture their first championship. The 2016 season was also notable for the Champions, drawing 179,618 people in its ballpark, including a franchise record crowd of 7,886 on 5 September.

On 28 June 2017, Gatineau native Phillippe Aumont threw the first no-hitter in Ottawa Champions history against the Dominican Republic national baseball team.

After the 2019 season, The Can-Am League merged with the Frontier League (FL). However, the Champions were left off the 2020 schedule.

Shortly after the Champions were left off the 2020 schedule, Winnipeg Goldeyes owner Sam Katz was attempting to bring either an Atlantic or Frontier League franchise to Ottawa by 2021. Katz then became the owner of the Ottawa Titans of the FL.

== RCGT Park renovations ==
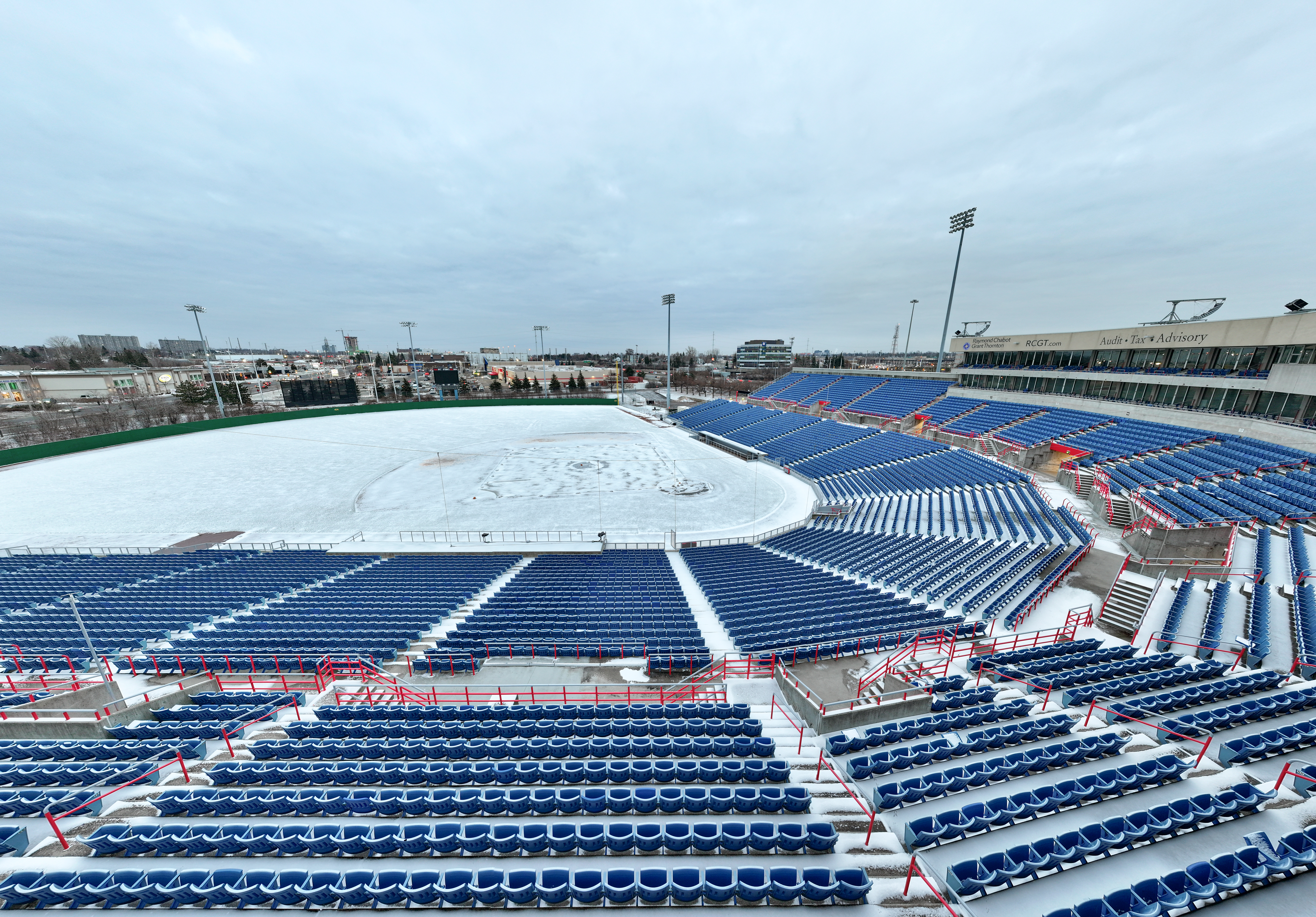
The stadium in winter 2019

The Ottawa Champions played their home games at RCGT Park, a 10,332-seat stadium built just east of downtown Ottawa. As part of the plans to revitalize baseball in Ottawa, the city and the team invested more than $2 million worth of renovations into the stadium. These renovations included a brand-new video scoreboard.

Along with the stadium renovations, the city built a new pedestrian bridge to help make it easier to get to the ballpark using public transit. The pedestrian bridge crosses over Highway 417 to connect the ballpark to the Transit Way and is named in honour of the late Max Keeping.

== Season-by-season records ==
Season-by-season record
Season	Total	Finished	Playoffs
2015 (6 Teams)	46-50 (5)	.479	Did not qualify
2016 (6 Teams)	51-49 (4)	.510	Won Opening Round over New Jersey Jackals 3-1; Won Championship over Rockland Boulders 3-2
2017 (6 Teams)	42-56 (5)	.429	Did not qualify
2018 (8 Teams)	41-60 (6)	.406	Did not qualify
2019 (9 Teams)	41-54 (5)	.432	Did not qualify
Regular season totals	221-269	.451	
Postseason Totals	6-3	.667	
Combined Totals	227-272	.455	

== See also ==
- Can-Am League
- Frontier League
- Ottawa Titans
