= New York Boulders =

Frontier League baseball team in New York State

Logo
Cap insignia

Information
- League: National Association of Professional Baseball (2020–present) (East Division)
- Location: Pomona, New York
- Ballpark: Clover Stadium
- Founded: 2011
- League championships: 1: 2014
- Division championships: 2: 2014, 2015
- Playoff berths: 10 2014 2015 2016 2017 2018 2019 2020 2022 2025 2026
- Former name: Rockland Boulders (2011–2019)
- Former league: Can-Am League (2011–2019)
- Colors: Royal blue, red, white
- Mascot: BoulderBird
- Ownership: Rockland Professional Baseball, LLC
- President: Shawn Reilly
- Manager: T.J. Stanton
- Media: The Journal News; HomeTeam Network
- Website: nyboulders.com

The New York Boulders are a professional baseball team based in Pomona, New York. The Boulders compete in the National Association of Professional Baseball (NAPB) as a member of the East Division in the Atlantic Conference. The team plays its home games at Clover Stadium, a stadium they share with the St. Thomas Aquinas College Spartans of the National Collegiate Athletic Association (NCAA). They are one of three Frontier League franchises located in the New York metropolitan area; the others being the New Jersey Jackals and Sussex County Miners.

Founded in 2011 by the Rockland Professional Baseball, LLC, the Boulders are one of the original teams that competed in the Can-Am League before its 2015 expansion, along with the New Jersey Jackals, Québec Capitales and Trois-Rivières Aigles.

The "Boulders" name refers to Rockland County's plethora of boulders in its landscape. The team's primary color, blue, alludes to the former Brooklyn Dodgers (now Los Angeles Dodgers), which used Bear Mountain State Park for spring training during World War II. The red honors the neighboring Rockland County Fire Training Center. Boulder Bird is the official team mascot and "Disco" Seth Cantor is the team's play-by-play announcer.

== History ==
Original logo (2011–2019)

On May 26, 2011, the Boulders won their first official game by a score of 11-5 over the Newark Bears after coming back from a 4-1 deficit. On July 24, 2011 in the top of the 9th inning with two outs, Joe Hage (23) hit a game-winning grand slam in the top of the 9th inning at Stade Municipal in Quebec City, Canada to give Rockland a 7-4 win over the Québec Capitales. It was the first grand-slam in Boulders history.

On September 4, 2011, the Boulders announced they had signed former New York Mets player Howard Johnson to a two-game contract to play alongside his son, Glen. Both games were played against the Newark Bears.

The Boulders signed their first three players Tommy Giles, Eric Flynn and Ryan Mollica, from Suffern in its history in March 2011. Of these three, Mollica remained and played in 86 games. On August 22, 2013, Boulders pitcher Charlie Law pitched a complete game no-hitter defeating the New Jersey Jackals, a major divisional rival.

On July 7, 2014, Outfielder Jerod Edmondson singled off Ryan Bollinger of the Trois-Rivières Aigles in the top of the fourth inning at Trois-Rivières, breaking the all-time Can-Am League record for career hits. His 700 career hits breaks the record previously held by former Major League Toronto Blue Jays player Chris Colabello. On August 25, 2014, the Boulders beat the Trois-Rivières Aigles and clinched the playoffs for the first time in the franchise's history.

On September 2, 2014, The best-of-seven Parkway Series between the Rockland Boulders (Palisades Interstate Parkway) and the New Jersey Jackals (Garden State Parkway) began. The Boulders captured their first league championship beating their river rivals, the New Jersey Jackals at Yogi Berra Stadium in four games.

On August 11, 2023, New York Boulders turned the first triple play in franchise history against the home team Ottawa Titans. Left-handed starting pitcher Ryan Munoz froze the runners on first and second base by allowing an attempted bunt to touch the ground, then picked up the ball and fired a strike to third base initiating an around-the-horn triple play that went from third baseman Gabriel Garcia to shortstop Matt McDermott and was capped by first baseman Chris Kwitzer.

== Clover Stadium ==
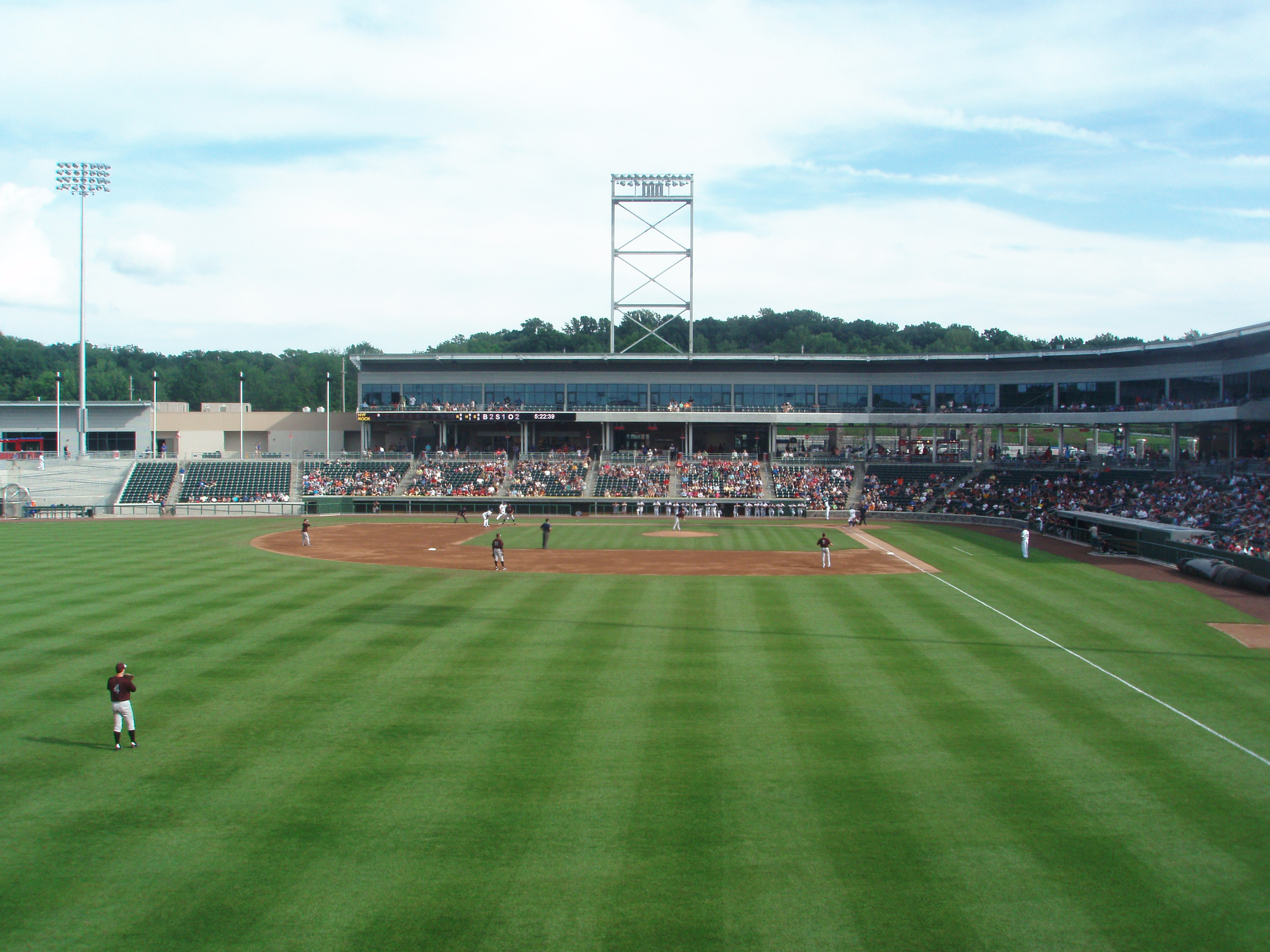
The stadium in 2015

The New York Boulders' stadium is Clover Stadium. It was originally known as Provident Bank Park then as Palisades Credit Union Park and contains 9,362 seats, 16 luxury and 11 loge boxes. The dimensions of the playing field are 323 feet down the left-field line, 313 feet down the right-field line, power alleys of 383 feet, and 403 feet at centerfield. The park also includes a 34-foot x 52-foot scoreboard, as well as a 75-foot ribbon sign board. Other features include special hearing-impaired seating with loudspeakers installed under each seat, a children's playground, and community rooms. The park also contains an indoor batting cage used by players to warm up prior to games which is open to the public during the game.

== Season-by-season records ==
Rockland Boulders (2011–2019)
Season	1st Half	2nd Half	Total	Finished	Playoffs
2011 (8 Teams)	19–27 (7)	21–25 (6)	40–52	.435	Did not qualify
2012 (5 Teams)	-	-	48–52	.480	Did not qualify
2013 (5 Teams)	-	-	49–51	.490	Did not qualify
2014 (4 Teams)	-	-	56–40	.583	Won League Championship; New Jersey Jackals, 4–2
2015 (6 Teams)	-	-	63–34	.649	Lost to Trois-Rivières Aigles, 3–2, in Semifinals.
2016 (8 Teams)	-	-	58–42	.580	Won Opening Round vs Quebec Capitales 3-2; Lost Championship to Ottawa Champions 3–2
2017 (7 Teams)	-	-	64–35	.646	Won Opening Round vs New Jersey Jackals 3–1; Lost Championship to Quebec Capitales 3–0
2018 (8 Teams)	-	-	54–48	.529	Lost Opening Round to Quebec Capitales 3–1
2019 (9 Teams)	-	-	43–50	.462	Lost Opening Round to Sussex County Miners 3–1
Totals	564–487	.537	16–20		

New York Boulders (2020–present)
Season	Total	Finished	Playoffs
2020 (6 Teams)	14-9	.609	Lost Opening Game vs. New Jersey Jackals 11-2; Lost Fifth Place Game vs. Skylands Cardinals 7-6 (See note)
2021 (14 Teams)	43-52	.453	Did not qualify
2022 (16 Teams)	57-38	.600	Lost East Division Wild Card Playoff Game 8-2 to the Ottawa Titans
2023 (16 Teams)	54-42	.563	Did not qualify
2024 (16 Teams)	52-44	.542	Did not qualify
2025 (18 Teams)	52-43	.547	Lost Wild Card Round to Québec Capitales 2-0
2026 (18 Teams)	55-46	.545	Won Wild Card Round vs. Québec Capitales 2-1; Lost East Division Conference Finals to Ottawa Titans 3-0
Totals	270-236	.551	1-5

1: In 2020, due to the COVID-19 pandemic, the All-American Baseball Challenge was held and the Boulders participated in it along with the Jackals and Miners. Three other custom teams also played in the league. The league featured players from independent, affiliated minor league, and college baseball. However, the team kept the franchise’s former name of Rockland Boulders for the season.

== Broadcasting ==
Boulders games are broadcast on Mixlr. All games are also broadcast on hometeamlive.com.

== Current roster ==
New York Boulders roster
Active (24-man) roster		Coaching staff
Pitchers: 13 Andrew Armstrong; 34 Alex Barker; 23 Emmett Bice; 35 Ethan Bradford; 3 Garrett Cooper; 38 Wesley Culley; 33 Connor Godwin; 27 Grady Gorgen; 25 Scott Harper; 28 Anthony Leak; 12 Jalon Long; 8 Garrett Peters; 20 Cobe Reeves; 1 Isaac Rohde; 16 Tyler Vail	Catchers: 29 Jason Agresti; 9 Jimmy Costin; Infielders: 15 Fritz Genther; 4 Kyle Hess; 30 Norris McClure; 22 Santino Rosso; Outfielders: 5 Julian Boyd; 26 John Schroeder; 21 Aaron Simmons; 31 Dan Tauken	Manager: -- T. J. Stanton; Coaches: -- Alfredo Marte (hitting); -- Mark Reardanz (pitching); -- Ryan Steeg (Assistant pitching); -- Anthony Corona (bench); Disabled list; ‡ Inactive list; § Suspended list; updated June 10, 2026

== Notable alumni ==
- Howard Johnson (2011) 2x MLB All-Star and 2x World Series champion
- Barry Wesson (2011)
- John Jay Moooler (2011)
- Gustavo Chacín (2012)
- Julio Santana (2012)
- Carlos Rivera (2013)
- Bobby Jones (2013)
- Andrew Taylor (2014)
- Stephen Cardullo (2013–2015, 2024)
- Donnie Joseph (2016)
- Markus Solbach (2016–2017)
- Mayckol Guaipe (2017)
- C. J. Riefenhauser (2017)
- Justin Topa (2017–2018)
- Ezequiel Carrera (2019)
- Alex Carrillo (2021)
- Zach Penprase (2021)
- Chris Kwitzer (2022–2024)
- Patrick Kivlehan (2023)
- Assaf Lowengart (2024)
- Alfredo Marte (2024)
