= Sussex County Miners =

Frontier League baseball team in New Jersey

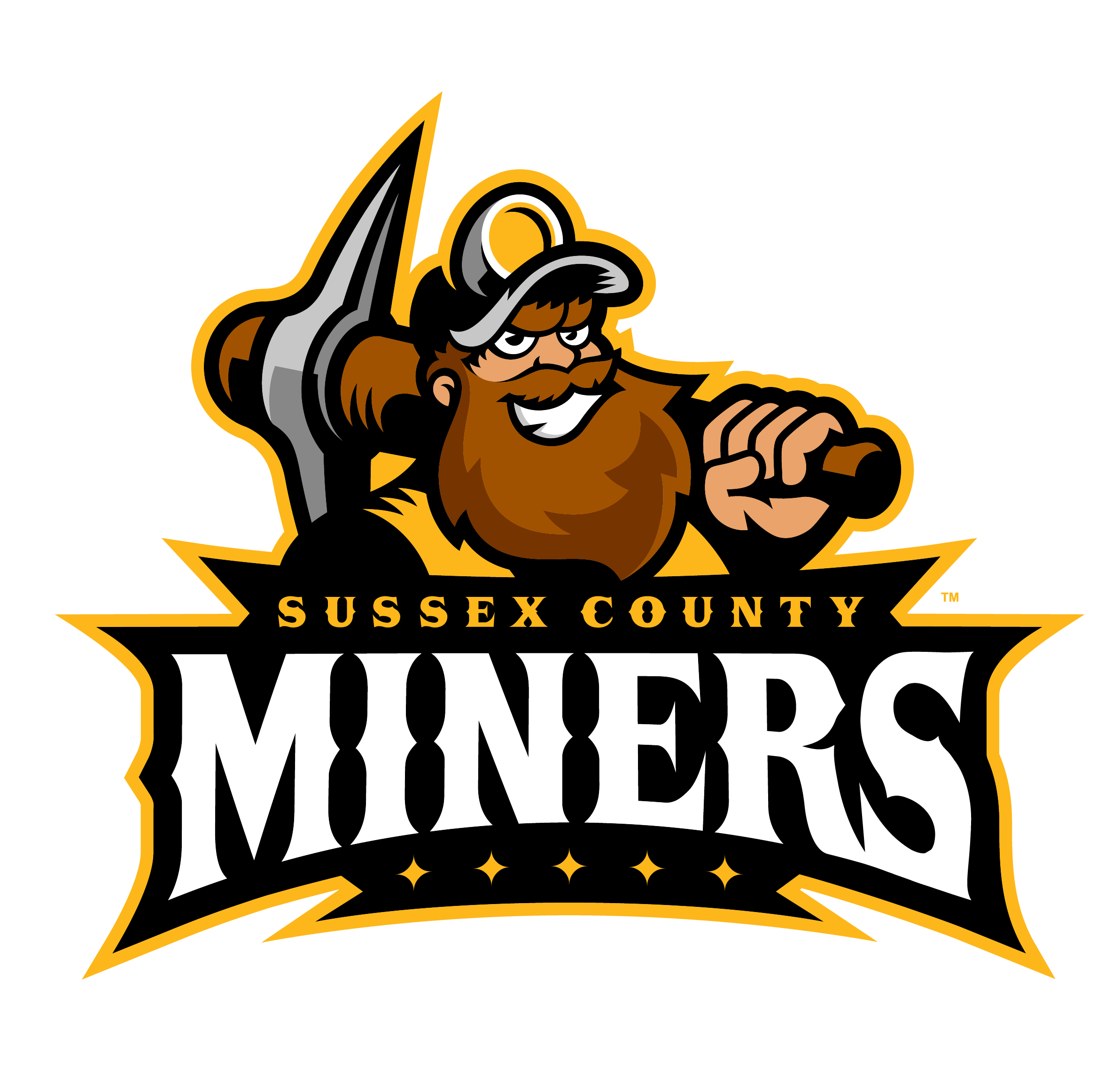
Logo
Cap insignia

Information
- League: National Association of Professional Baseball (2020–present)
- Location: Augusta, New Jersey
- Ballpark: Skylands Stadium
- Founded: 2015
- League championships: 1: (2018)
- Division championships: 4: (2018, 2019, 2020, 2025)
- Playoff berths: 6 2017 2018 2019 2020 2023 2025
- Former league: Can-Am League (2015–2019)
- Colors: Black, gold, white
- Mascot: Herbie the Miner
- Ownership: Al Dorso
- General manager: Vincent Sangemino
- Manager: Chris Widger
- Media: New Jersey Herald, HomeTeam Network
- Website: sussexcountyminers.com

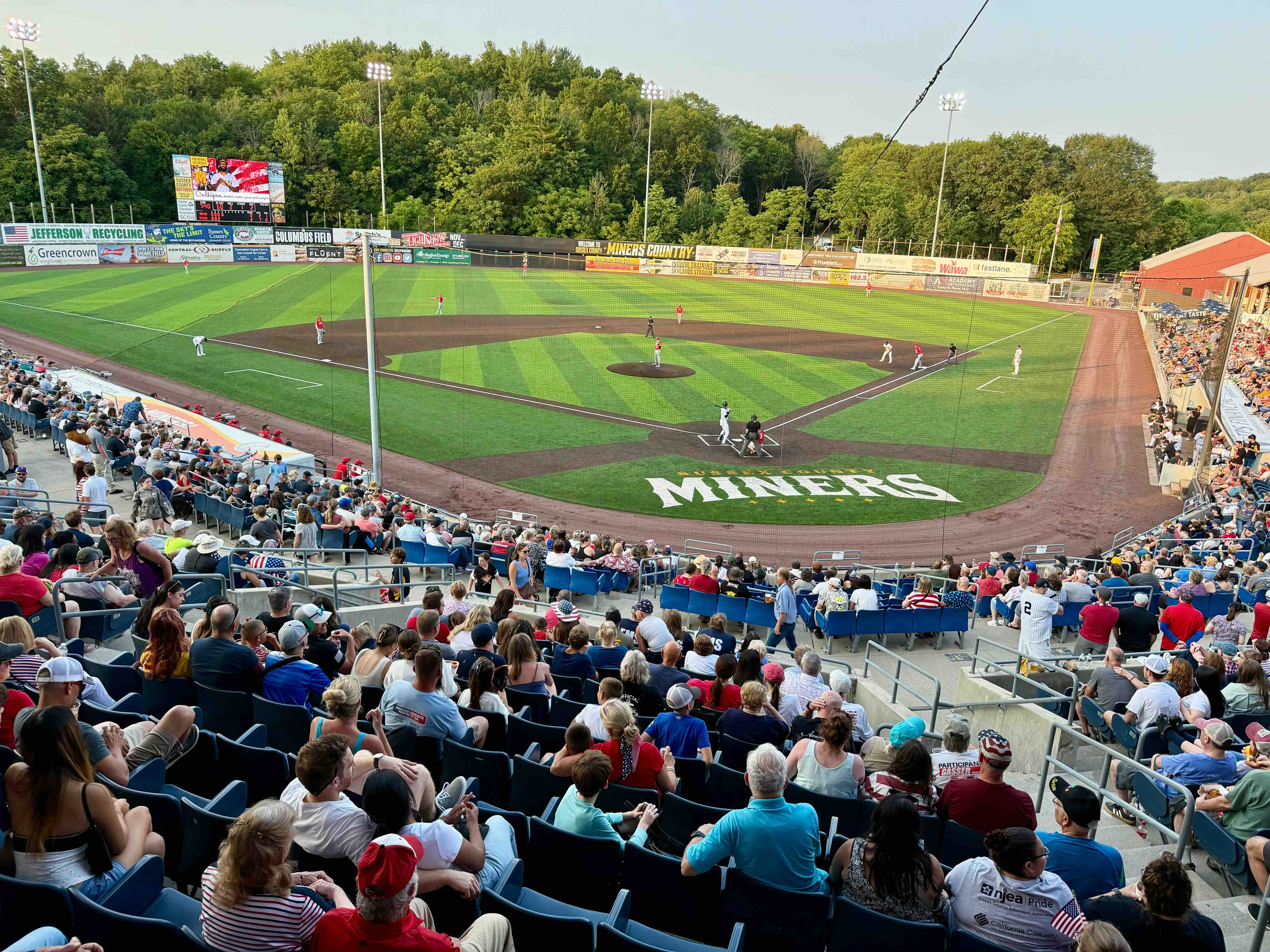
Skylands Stadium

The Sussex County Miners are a professional baseball team based in Augusta, New Jersey. The Miners compete in the National Association of Professional Baseball (NAPB) as a member of the East Division in the Atlantic Conference. The team plays its home games at Skylands Stadium, originally known as Skylands Park until 2014.

Founded during the 2015 Can-Am League expansion, the Miners have qualified for the playoffs five times, and have won the 2018 Can-Am League Championship in four games against the Québec Capitales. The Miners are not currently affiliated to any Major League Baseball teams, but are official MLB Partners since 2020. They were originally members of the Canadian American Association of Professional Baseball (Can-Am League) until 2020. They joined the Frontier League for the 2020 season when it absorbed the Can-Am League. The team is owned by Sussex Professional Baseball, LLC. The Miners' mascot is Herbie the Miner.

== History of professional baseball in Sussex County ==
Skylands Stadium, originally called Skylands Park, opened in 1994. The stadium was built for the relocating Glens Falls Redbirds, who at the time were the St. Louis Cardinals' New York–Penn League affiliate and were playing in Glens Falls, New York at East Field. The team was relocating for the second time in as many years after playing in Hamilton, Ontario in 1992.

The team became known as the New Jersey Cardinals after moving to Sussex County and played there until 2005. Following the season, the Cardinals announced they were relocating their New York–Penn League affiliate to University Park, Pennsylvania, where it became known as the State College Spikes.

The Can-Am League announced shortly after the Cardinals' move was made official that they would be expanding for the 2006 season and adding a team in Sussex County. Owned by the same ownership group that held the New Jersey Jackals, the new team was named the Sussex Skyhawks after a contest where fans submitted names. The Skyhawks won the league championship in 2008, but folded in 2010.

Skylands Park was also a temporary home for the Newark Bears of the Atlantic League of Professional Baseball in their inaugural season; the Bears played their first 20 home games there while Riverfront Stadium in Newark was being built.

=== Sussex County Miners ===
In 2014, after purchasing Skylands Stadium the year before, Dorso officially announced the arrival of the Miners, who began play the following season. The Miners struggled their first two seasons, finishing last and second-to-last in the league and missing the playoffs both season.

In the 2017 season, the Miners qualified for the playoffs for the first time in franchise history. However, they got swept 3-0 in the opening round by the eventual champions, the Québec Capitales. The following season, the Miners won their first regular season title, placing first in the league. On September 9, 2018, the Miners defeated the Trois-Rivières Aigles in the opening round series 3-2 to advance to their first championship round in franchise history. The following series, they defeated the Québec Capitales 3-1 in the championship series to earn their first league championship, winning on a dramatic walk-off home run by Martin Figueroa. The Miners were almost able to replicate their success the following season, finishing first in the regular season standings and winning their opening round series against their rival Rockland Boulders. In the championship series, however, they lost 3-1 to their in-state rival New Jersey Jackals, also owned by Dorso.

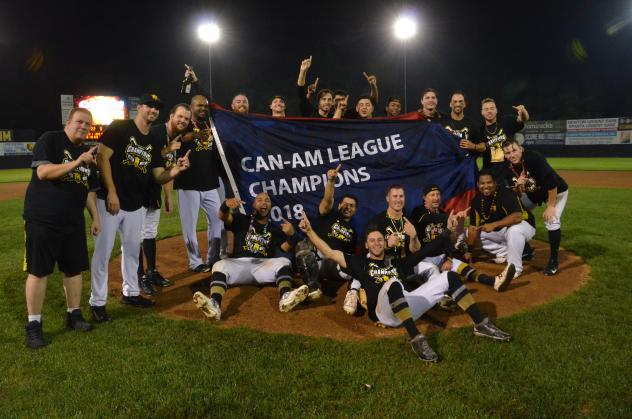
The 2018 Miners celebrate their Can-Am Championship win.

Following the 2019 season, it was announced that the Can-Am League, along with five of its six teams, would be absorbed by the Frontier League. Due to the COVID-19 pandemic, however, the Frontier League announced there would be no season that year. Instead, the Miners played in the local All-American Baseball Challenge, a six-team league introduced to entertain fans during the pandemic. Skylands Stadium hosted the Miners and the Skylands Cardinals, a team introduced for the challenge that referenced the area's baseball history. The Miners had a stellar regular season in the Challenge, finishing first in the league's standings, but fell to the New York Brave in the opening round, eliminating them from the championship game. The Miners finished third in the Challenge after beating the Jersey Wise Guys in the third place game.

In 2021, the Miners officially began Frontier League play, but missed the playoffs after finishing second in the Northeast Division. After the league's 2025 realignment, the Miners play in the League's East Division, along with the New Jersey Jackals, New York Boulders, and Down East Bird Dawgs.

Following the 2022 season, it was announced that Field Manager Bobby Jones would become the Vice President of the New Jersey Jackals. The Miners announced that former Major League catcher Chris Widger would manage the ball club in 2023.

=== Rivalries ===
==== New Jersey Jackals ====
Considered by some to be the best rivalry in the FL, also known as the "Battle of New Jersey". The New Jersey Jackals–Sussex County Miners rivalry began in 2015 when the Miners were introduced in the Can-Am League. The rivalry exists both due to divisional alignment and geographic location, as both teams play in New Jersey. They've faced each other in the playoffs three times, the last time being the 2023 East Division Wild Card Game.

==== New York Boulders ====
The Boulders–Miners rivalry is due to both teams located within a distance of 50 miles, as well as playing in the same league/division for several years. The Miners are one of the three FL teams located in the New York metropolitan area, along with the Boulders and the Jackals. The rivalry is similar to the Jackals–Boulders rivalry, also known as the ''Battle of the Hudson River''.

== Season-by-season records ==
Sussex County Miners (2015–present)
Season	Record (place)	Win %	Playoffs
Can-Am League
2015 (6 Teams)	38–59 (6)	.392	Did not qualify
2016 (6 Teams)	39–61 (5)	.390	Did not qualify
2017 (6 Teams)	45–54 (4)	.455	Lost Opening Round vs. Quebec Capitales 3–0
2018 (6 Teams)	63–38 (1)	.624	Won Opening Round vs. Trois-Rivières Aigles 3–2; Won Championship vs. Quebec Capitales 3–1
2019 (6 Teams)	61–33 (1)	.649	Won Opening Round vs. Rockland Boulders 3–1; Lost Championship vs. New Jersey Jackals 3–1
All-American Baseball Challenge
2020 (6 Teams)	16—6 (1)	.727	Lost Opening Game vs. New York Brave 5-1; Won Third Place Game vs. Jersey Wise Guys 5-1
Frontier League
2021 (14 Teams)	49–46 (2)	.516	Did not qualify
2022 (16 Teams)	54–41 (4)	.568	Did not qualify
2023 (16 Teams)	55–40 (3)	.544	Lost East Division Wild Card Playoff Game to New Jersey Jackals 5-0
2024 (16 Teams)	33–62 (8)	.347	Did not qualify
2025 (18 Teams)	53–43 (1)	.552	Lost Wild Card Round to Tri-City ValleyCats 2-0
2026 (18 Teams)	48–54 (3)	.471	Did not qualify
Totals	554–537	.519	—

== Current roster ==
Sussex County Miners roster
Active (24-man) roster	Coaching staff
Pitchers: -- JC Ariza; -- Jackson Balzan; -- Chad Gartland; -- Robert Hensey Jr.; -- Dan Kiritsis; -- William Parsons; 39 Mike Reagan; -- Hunter Rossi; 12 Matt Stil; Catchers: -- Keenan O'Brien; Infielders: -- Mahki Backstrom; -- Sean Roby Jr.; -- Gionti Turner; Outfielders: -- Dominick Bucko; -- Dominic Johnson; -- Will Zimmerman	Manager: 26 Chris Widger; Coaches: 44 Gavin Stupienski (hitting); 5 Simon Walters (assistant); Disabled list; ‡ Inactive list; § Suspended list; updated April 25, 2025 Transactions

== Notable alumni ==
- Reggie Abercrombie (2015)
- Ray Sadler (2015)
- Robb Paller (2016)
- Adron Chambers (2017)
- David Rollins (2018)
- Kalian Sams (2019)
- Nick Shumpert (2019–2020)
- Cito Culver (2019–2022)
- Vin Mazzaro (2020, 2022)
- Tyler Danish (2020)
- Todd Frazier (2021)
