= Clover Stadium =

Baseball stadium in Pomona, New York, United States

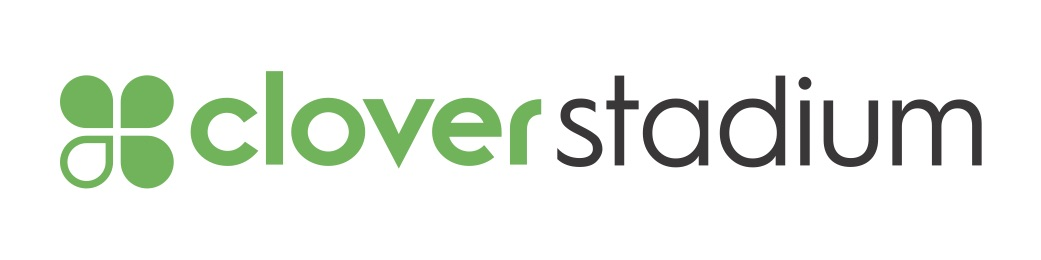

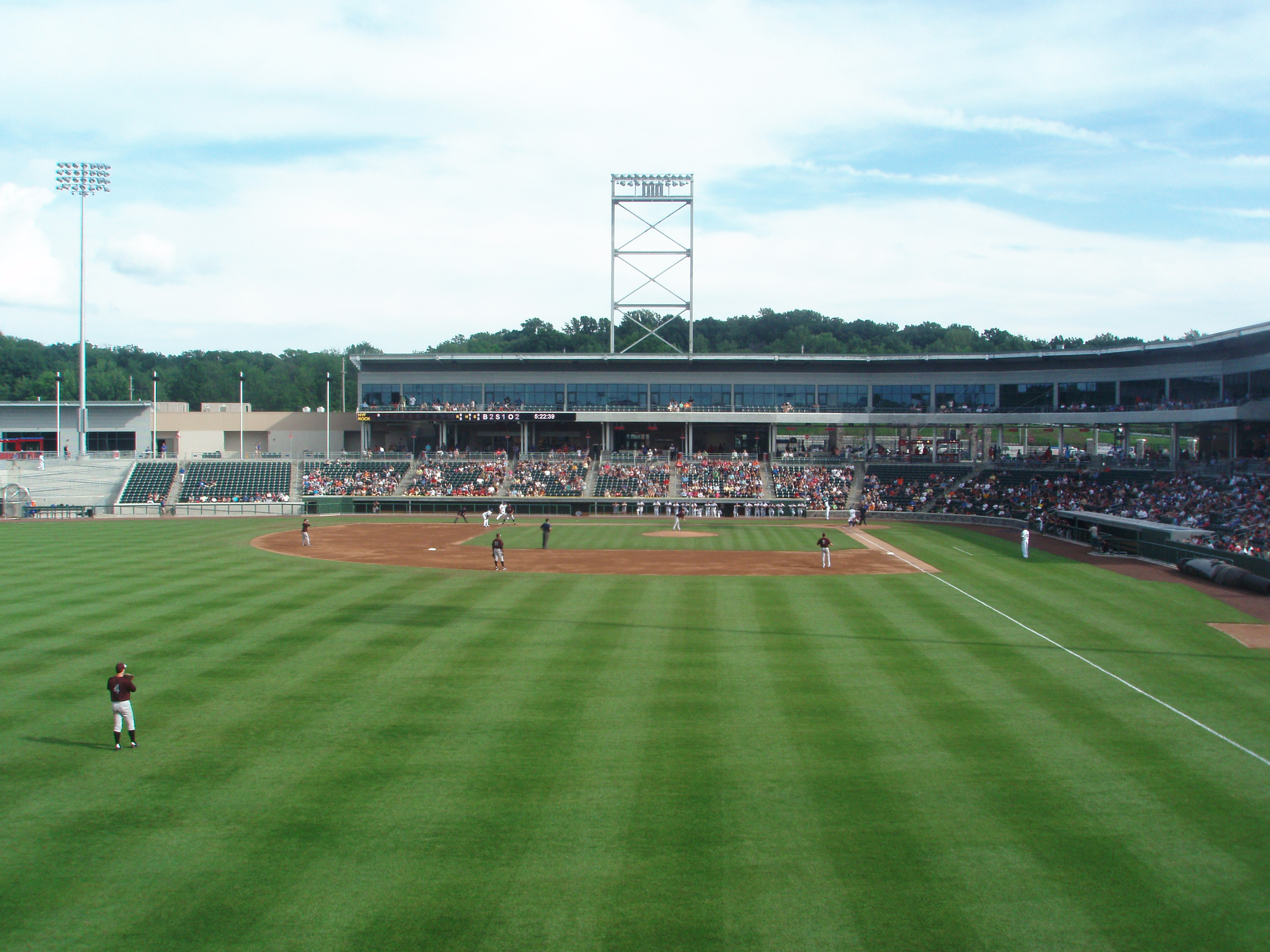

- Location within New York Location within the United States
- Interactive map of Clover Stadium
- Former names: Palisades Credit Union Park (2016–2021); Provident Bank Park (2011–2016)
- Location: Pomona, New York
- Coordinates: 41.170°N 74.037°W
- Owner: Ramapo Local Development Corp
- Operator: New York Boulders
- Capacity: 4,506 (2011–2020); 6,580 (2020–2021); 6,362 (2021–present)
- Surface: Grass
- Record attendance: 7,336 (August 26, 2018)
- Field size: Left field:323 ft (98 m); Left-center:383 ft (117 m); Center field:403 ft (123 m); Right-center:383 ft (117 m); Right field:312 ft (95 m)

Construction
- Groundbreaking: September 10, 2010
- Built: 2010–2011
- Opened: June 16, 2011
- Cost: US$38 million
- Architect: DLR Group
- Builders: Holt Construction Corp, Pearl River, NY

Tenants
- New York Boulders (NAPB) 2011–present Dominican Chargers (NCAA) 2012–present St. Thomas Aquinas Spartans (NCAA) 2012–present Nyack College (NCAA) 2012–2022; Manhattan Jaspers (NCAA) 2022–present

Clover Stadium is a baseball park in Pomona, New York. It is the home of the New York Boulders of the National Association of Professional Baseball. It has a seating capacity of 6,362 and it opened on June 16, 2011. The stadium is also home to three college baseball teams. The NCAA Division II St. Thomas Aquinas College Spartans and Dominican Chargers baseball teams each began playing their home games at the venue in the spring of 2012. The Manhattan Jaspers baseball team, which plays in Division I, has used Clover Stadium as its home venue since 2022.

In 2012, the project to design and build the stadium received the Ward House Award from the Lower Hudson Valley Branch of the American Society of Civil Engineers. Originally named Provident Bank Park, naming rights were sold to Palisades Federal Credit Union in April 2016 and to Fiserv in January 2022 who renamed it Clover Stadium for the company's Clover point-of-sale-platform.

== Notable events ==
- The park hosted games 3, 4, and 5 of the 2014 Can-Am League Championship Round, featuring the Rockland Boulders and the New Jersey Jackals. It was the first time in the stadium's history that championship games were played. It did so again in 2016, with the Boulders hosting the Ottawa Champions, and in 2017, with the Boulders hosting the Québec Capitales.
- Field of Screams is a Halloween themed event for children that has been held every October since 2015.
- IceFest 2016 was hosted by the stadium on February 28, 2016. There was an ice rink installed inside the stadium, and the St. Thomas Aquinas College men's ice hockey team played against Columbia University that day. This event marked the first time that another sport other than baseball was played in the stadium. Other ice hockey teams that took the ice at the outdoor rink also included Nyack/Tappan Zee High School and Clarkstown North High School.
- The park hosted the 2019 Can-Am League/Frontier League Home Run Derby on July 9, 2019, and the Can-Am League/Frontier League All-Star Game on July 10, 2019.
- The park, billed as "Velvety Cheese Stadium", was a shooting location of the TV show Poker Face in the episode "Hometown Hero".
