= Trois-Rivières Aigles (2013) =

Frontier League baseball team in Quebec, Canada

Logo	Cap insignia

Information
- League: National Association of Professional Baseball (2020–present) (North Division)
- Location: Trois-Rivières, Quebec
- Ballpark: Stade Quillorama
- Founded: 2012
- Nickname: Les Oiseaux
- League championships: 1 (2015)
- Division championships: 0
- Playoff berths: 3 2015 2018 2019
- Former league: Can-Am League (2013–2019)
- Colours: Red, dark red, black, silver, white
- Mascot: Grand Chelem
- Retired numbers: 22
- Ownership: Emmanuel Turcotte, Michel Côté, Miles Wolff, Marc-Andre Bergeron, Éric Gagné
- General manager: Simon Laliberté
- Manager: T.J. White
- Media: Le Nouvelliste; RDS; TVA Sports; CFOU 89,1FM; HomeTeam Network
- Website: lesaiglestr.com

The Trois-Rivières Aigles (French: Aigles de Trois-Rivières), officially Le club de baseball des Aigles, are a professional baseball team based in Trois-Rivières. The Aigles compete in the National Association of Professional Baseball (NAPB) as a member of the North Division in the Atlantic Conference. The team plays its home games at the 4,000-seat Stade Quillorama, which opened in 1938 as Stade Municipal de Trois-Rivières.

Founded and established by Emmanuel Turcotte, the team is the second franchise in Trois-Rivières to use the Trois-Rivières Aigles name. The original Trois-Rivières Aigles, founded in 1971, were affiliated to the Cincinnati Reds as a Double-A affiliate playing in the Eastern League. In addition, a team in the Ligue de Baseball Junior Élite du Québec bore that name, winning the 2007 pennant. The Aigles have made three playoff appearances, and won the 2015 Can-Am League Championship against the New Jersey Jackals in five games.

== History ==
After various attempts to place a franchise in Trois-Rivières (including various exhibition games), the Can-Am League finally announced the Aigles' membership on October 3, 2012. Notable co-owners include 2003 National League Cy Young Award winner Éric Gagné and Carolina Hurricanes defenceman Marc-André Bergeron.

On November 14, 2012, it was announced that Pierre-Luc Laforest would serve as the Aigles' first field manager. Laforest is best known for his time among the Aigles' provincial rivals, the Québec Capitales, winning the Can-Am League MVP award in 2009 and serving as player/hitting coach in 2011 and 2012. He was a member of all four of the Capitales' four consecutive Can-Am League pennant winners.

The Aigles played their inaugural home opener on May 28, 2013, and won the game 10–1 against the St. Paul Saints in front of a near-capacity crowd of 3,784. However, the attendance numbers steadily declined from there, except for a modest increase in August. By the end of the season, Trois-Rivières had the lowest average attendance in the league, averaging 1,643 fans per game, and have not qualified for the playoffs.

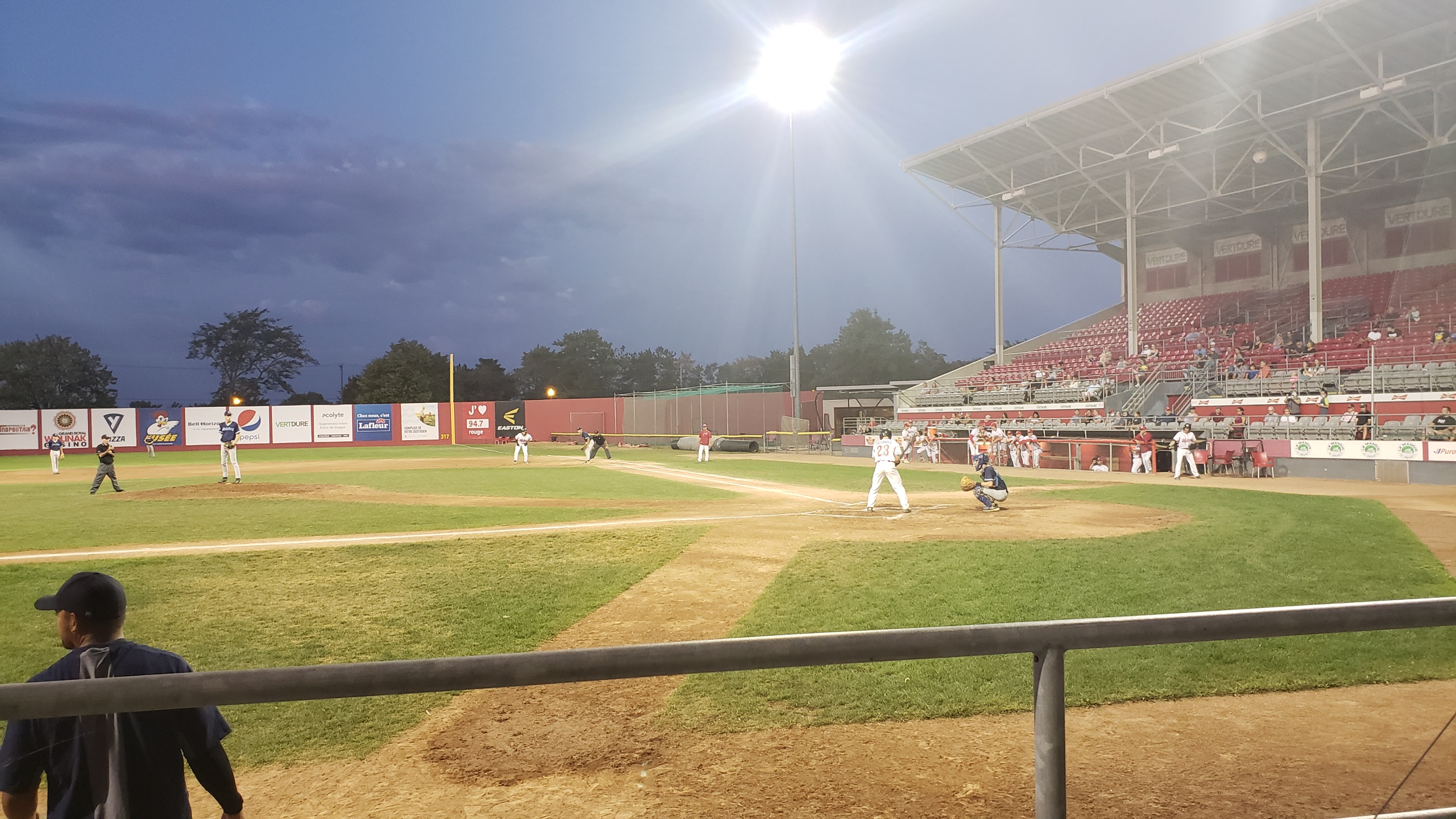
A Trois-Rivières Aigles game against the Salina Stockade in 2018.

On August 28, 2015, a stadium record crowd of 6,022 invaded the Stade Fernand-Bédard as former Major League Baseball pitcher Éric Gagné was the starting pitcher for one game in a Aigles uniform, and the Aigles were able to pull a 5–3 win against their provincial rival Québec Capitales. At the end of the season, the Aigles qualified for the playoffs for the first time in the franchise's history, and have defeated the Rockland Boulders in the semifinals in five games. They advanced to the Can-Am League Championship Finals and have played the New Jersey Jackals to defeat them 3 games to 2 to win the 2015 Can-Am League Championship. The 2015 season was also notable for the Aigles for drawing 96,997 people to its ballpark for an average of 1,865, including several sellouts of 4,000 people or more during the regular season.

The team joined the Frontier League for the 2020 season when that league absorbed the Can-Am League in a merger. However, due to the COVID-19 pandemic and extended closure of the Canada–United States border, the league announced that the Aigles (along with the Québec Capitales) would be unable to compete for the 2020 season (which was eventually cancelled). The club later announced they intended to organize a separate league in Québec for the summer as an alternative, but these plans were eventually scrapped by both clubs.

The continued closure of the Canada–United States border, unfortunately resulted in pushing the Aigles’ first game in the FL to the 2022 season. Ottawa, Québec, and Trois-Rivières were replaced on the 2021 schedule by a travelling team named Équipe Québec. Équipe Québec used the Canadian players from the Ottawa Titans, Québec Capitales and Trois-Rivières Aigles to craft the base of their roster and spent the first half of the season on the road, before returning to Canada in late July. Équipe Québec split home games between Stade Canac in Quebec City and Stade Quillorama in Trois-Rivières.

On July 30, 2021, Équipe Québec hosted the New York Boulders at Stade Canac and won the game 10–8 in front of a full house of 2,800 people, the maximum number that was allowed due to the Government of Quebec's public health restrictions.

On September 12, 2021, Équipe Québec qualified for the playoffs, and then faced the Washington Wild Things in the best-of-five Frontier League Division Series (FLDS). The capacity crowd of 4,287 gathered at Stade Canac during Game 3 represented nearly 1,500 more people than the number allowed due to public health restrictions, and Québec were able to pull a 3–2 win over the Wild Things. They however lost Game 4 and 5 at home, which made an end to their very unique season. Équipe Québec finished the season first place in the Atlantic Division with a record of 52 wins and 44 losses with an average of 2,198 fans in 24 home games, including the playoffs. A full reset was done by the team's front office to immediately shift focus on the 2022 season.

== Rivalries ==
=== Québec Capitales ===
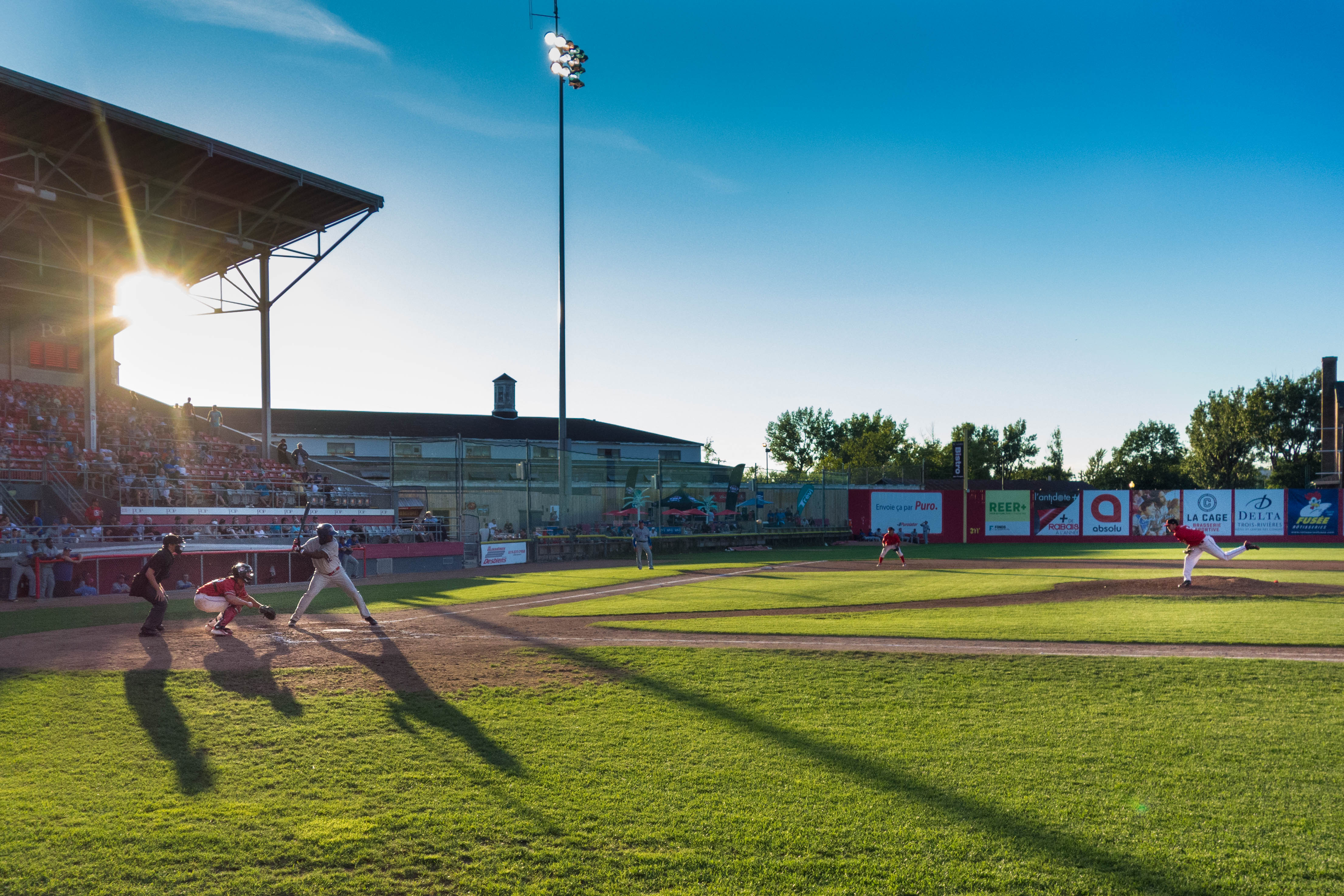
The Aigles hosting the Capitales at Stade Quillorama in Trois-Rivières in 2023.

The Trois-Rivières Aigles' main rivalry is against the Québec Capitales. It is also sometimes referred as the Battle of Quebec, following the old rivalry between the Montreal Canadiens and the Quebec Nordiques which had the same name. The teams compete in the same division and meet frequently during regular season games. Although they have never faced each other in a playoff series, the rivalry remains significant due to the 85-kilometre distance between the two home fields (Stade Canac and Stade Quillorama, respectively), and that they are the only two FL teams located in the province of Quebec. The rivalry began before the FL existed, as the Quebec Athletics and Trois-Rivières Royals competed in the Provincial League. Quebec City and Trois-Rivières teams first competed against each other in 1939 in the minor Quebec Provincial League.

As of the end of the 2024 season, Québec leads the regular season record 106–81.

=== Ottawa Titans ===
The rivalry between the former Ottawa Champions and the Trois-Rivières Aigles and later, the contemporary Ottawa Titans began before the COVID-19 pandemic, as both teams played in the Can-Am League beginning in 2015. The teams first played each other on July 23, 2015, with the Champions defeating the Aigles 9–8.

Since 2022 in the Frontier League, The Aigles and the contemporary Titans face each other often as they both compete in the North Division. Fueling the rivalry is the cities' proximity to each other. There is only a three-hour drive from Ottawa to Trois-Rivières via Quebec Autoroute 40 and Ontario Highway 417, plus some bus connections. The current Ottawa Titans' first game against Trois-Rivières was held in Ottawa on June 7, 2022, where the Titans beat the Aigles 5–3.

As of the end of the 2024 season, Ottawa leads the all-time regular season record 54–53.

== Season-by-season records ==
Trois-Rivières Aigles
Season	W–L Record	Win %	Finish	Playoffs
2013	43–56	.434	4th/5 in Can-Am League	Did not qualify for playoffs
2014	37–58	.474	4th/4 in Can-Am League	Did not qualify for playoffs
2015	50–46	.521	4th/6 in Can-Am League	Won Opening Round over Rockland Boulders 3–2; Won Championship over New Jersey Jackals 3–2
2016	35–65	.350	8th/8 in Can-Am League	Did not qualify for playoffs
2017	39–61	.390	6th/8 in Can-Am League	Did not qualify for playoffs
2018	53–49	.520	4th/8 in Can-Am League	Lost Opening Round to Sussex County Miners 3–2
2019	58–37	.611	2nd/9 in Can-Am League	Lost Opening Round to New Jersey Jackals 3–2
2020	—	—	—	Season cancelled due to COVID-19
2021	Did not play. See note	—	—	--
2022	45–50	.474	7th/8 in FL East	Did not qualify for playoffs
2023	38–57	.400	7th/8 in FL East	Did not qualify for playoffs
2024	44–51	.463	5th/8 in FL East	Did not qualify for playoffs
2025	38–57	.400	5th/5 in FL East Atlantic Conference North Division	Did not qualify for playoffs
2026	38–64	.373	5th/5 in FL East Atlantic Conference North Division	Did not qualify for playoffs
Totals	570–695	.450	—	12–13

*In 2021, Équipe Québec, a combination of the Ottawa Titans, Québec Capitales and Trois-Rivières Aigles, played in the Frontier League. With a record of 52–44, they finished 1st place in the Atlantic Division, but lost the Division Series to the Washington Wild Things 3 games to 2.

== Current roster ==
Trois-Rivières Aigles roster
Active roster	Coaching staff
Pitchers: -- Alexander Castro; -- Nathan Draves; -- Ronaldo Fernandez; -- Mike Hansell; -- Halen Knoll; -- Cameron Kramer; 11 Nathan Landry; -- Charles Lefebvre; -- Jacob Peaden; -- Ethan Petric; -- Luis Manuel Rodriguez; 29 Harry Rutkowski; -- Jesen Therrien; -- Eric Waldichuk; -- Adam Wibert; Catchers: -- Chris Burgess; -- Cale Jones; -- Joshua Lopez; Infielders: -- Luis Curbelo; -- Brandon Hylton; -- AJ Karosas; -- Omar Meregildo; -- John Montes; -- Edward Sanchez; 16 James Smibert; Outfielders: -- Felix Chennier-Rondeau; -- Justin Farmer; -- Juan Carlos Negret; 30 LP Pelletier; -- Mathieu Vallee; -- David Vinsky; -- Tucker Zdunich	Manager: -- Jonathan Albaladejo; Coaches: -- Jerry Gonzalez (pitching); -- Eddy Gonzalez (assistant); Disabled list; ‡ Inactive list; § Suspended list; updated April 27, 2025 Transactions

== Notable alumni ==
- Pete Laforest (2013)
- Pedro López (2015)
- Éric Gagné (2015)
- Jerry Gil (2015)
- Andrew Taylor (2015)
- Ryan Bollinger (2014–2016)
- Danny Richar (2016)
- Andrew Chin (2017)
- Bubby Rossman (2019)
- Oscar Hernández (2023)
- Jesen Therrien (2023–present)
- Mario Feliciano (2024)
