= Former Can-Am League franchises =

This is lists of baseball teams that formerly played in the Canadian-American Association of Professional Baseball, also known as the Can-Am League, or any of its two predecessors, the Northeast League or Northern League East Division.

== Former teams ==
Team	City	Stadium	Capacity	First season	Last season	History
Adirondack Lumberjacks	Glens Falls, New York	East Field	9,000	1995	2002	Became the Bangor Lumberjacks.
Albany-Colonie Diamond Dogs	Colonie, New York	Heritage Park	5,000	1995	2002	Folded after 2002 season.
Allentown Ambassadors	Allentown, Pennsylvania	Bicentennial Park	4,600	1997	2003	Folded shortly before start of 2004 season; replaced by Northeast League Aces.
American Defenders of New Hampshire	Nashua, New Hampshire	Holman Stadium	4,375	2009	2009	Evicted from stadium, moved to Pittsfield, Massachusetts following 2009 season and became Pittsfield Colonials.
Atlantic City Surf	Atlantic City, New Jersey	Bernie Robbins Stadium	5,500	2007	2008	Played in the Atlantic League 1998–2006. Folded shortly before start of 2009 season.
Bangor Blue Ox	Bangor, Maine	Larry Mahaney Diamond	3,000	1996	1997	Went dormant after 1997 season; franchise moved to Quebec for 1999 season.
Bangor Lumberjacks	Orono, Maine; Bangor, Maine	Larry Mahaney Diamond, U. Maine; Winkin Sports Complex, Husson College	3,000 (both)	2003	2004	Folded April 2005; replaced by Can-Am League Grays.
Brockton Rox	Brockton, Massachusetts	Campanelli Stadium	4,750	2002	2011	Joined summer-collegiate Futures League
Catskill Cougars/Sullivan Mountain Lions	Mountaindale, New York	Baxter Field	3,000	1995; 1997; 2000	1995; 1998; 2000	Left league in 1996 to play in the North Atlantic League. Returned in 1997, folded 1998. Returned in 2000, folded after season.
Berkshire Black Bears	Pittsfield, Massachusetts	Wahconah Park	4,500	2002	2003	Became the New Haven County Cutters.
Elmira Pioneers	Elmira, New York	Dunn Field	4,020	1996	2005	Moved to New York Collegiate Baseball League.
Massachusetts Mad Dogs	Lynn, Massachusetts	Fraser Field	4,375	1996	1999	Went dormant after 1999 season; franchise was moved to Pittsfield, Massachusetts for 2002 season.
Mohawk Valley Landsharks	Little Falls, New York	Little Falls Veterans Memorial Park	2,000	1995	1995	Became the Rhode Island Tiger Sharks.
Nashua Pride	Nashua, New Hampshire	Holman Stadium	4,375	1998	2008	Became the American Defenders of New Hampshire.
Newark Bears	Newark, New Jersey	Bears and Eagles Riverfront Stadium	6,200	1998	2013	Played in Atlantic League 1998–2009. Folded after 2013 season.
Newburgh Nighthawks	Newburgh, New York	Delano-Hitch Stadium	3,100	1995	1996	Folded after 1996 season, replaced by Waterbury Spirit.
New Haven County Cutters	New Haven, Connecticut	Yale Field	6,200	2004	2007	Folded after 2007 season.
North Shore Spirit	Lynn, Massachusetts	Fraser Field	4,375	2003	2007	Folded after 2007 season.
Ottawa Rapidz	Ottawa, Ontario	Ottawa Baseball Stadium	10,332	2008	2008	League took over team after 2008 season and renamed them the Ottawa Voyageurs. However, with the Atlantic City Surf ceasing operations, the league disbanded the Ottawa team shortly before the 2009 season.
Pittsfield Colonials	Pittsfield, Massachusetts	Wahconah Park	3,500	2010	2011	League voted to rescind team's charter after ownership group was unable to find investors.
Rhode Island Tiger Sharks	West Warwick, Rhode Island	McCarthy Field	1,500	1996	1996	Folded after 1996 season, replaced by Allentown Ambassadors.
Sussex Skyhawks	Augusta, NJ	Skylands Park	5,000	2006	2011	Folded after 2010 season.
Waterbury Spirit	Waterbury, Connecticut	Municipal Stadium	6,000	1997	2000	Went dormant after 2000 season; franchise was moved to Lynn, Massachusetts for 2003 season.
Worcester Tornadoes	Worcester, Massachusetts	Hanover Insurance Park at Fitton Field	3,000	2005	2012	Team charter revoked by League
Yonkers Hoot Owls	Yonkers, New York	Fleming Field	1,000	1995	1995	Folded after 1995 season.

=== League-operated traveling teams ===
Name	Year(s)	Reason	Disposition
Aces	2004	Departure of Allentown Ambassadors	Place taken in 2005 by the Worcester Tornadoes.
The Grays	2005	Departure of Bangor Lumberjacks	Place taken in 2006 by the Sussex Skyhawks.
The Grays	2007	Arrival of Atlantic City Surf caused uneven number of teams	Place taken in 2008 by the Ottawa Rapidz.
New York Federals	2011	Departure of Sussex Skyhawks, arrival of Rockland Boulders	Unneeded after folding of Newark Bears
Garden State Grays	2015	Maintain schedule after all-star team from Shikoku Island League Plus ended their tour of the league	

=== Teams that never played ===
Name	City	Stated to debut
Halifax	Halifax, Nova Scotia	1999
Moncton	Moncton, New Brunswick	1999
