= Floyd Youmans =

American baseball player (born 1964)

- Pitcher
- Born: May 11, 1964 (age 61); Tampa, Florida, U.S.
- Batted: Right Threw: Right

MLB debut
- July 1, 1985, for the Montreal Expos

Last MLB appearance
- June 24, 1989, for the Philadelphia Phillies

MLB statistics
- Win–loss record: 30–34
- Earned run average: 3.74
- Strikeouts: 424
- Stats at Baseball Reference

Teams
- Montreal Expos (1985–1988); Philadelphia Phillies (1989)

Floyd Everett Youmans (born May 11, 1964) is an American former professional baseball pitcher. He pitched all or part of five seasons in Major League Baseball from 1985–89. He is one of the players dealt by the New York Mets to the Montreal Expos for Hall of Fame catcher Gary Carter.

== Career ==
=== New York Mets ===
Youmans was born in Tampa, Florida, and was a childhood friend and Hillsborough High School teammate of former Mets pitcher Dwight Gooden before moving with his family to Fontana, California. He was drafted by the Mets in the second round of the 1982 Major League Baseball draft, one round after the club selected Gooden. He and Gooden were teammates on the Kingsport Mets in 1982.

With the South Atlantic League's Columbia Mets in 1983, Youmans went 12-3 with a 3.42 earned run average. After splitting the 1984 season between the Lynchburg and Jackson Mets, Youmans was traded on December 10, to the Montreal Expos along with Hubie Brooks, Mike Fitzgerald and Herm Winningham for future Hall of Fame catcher Gary Carter.

=== Montreal Expos ===
Youmans made his major league debut in the middle of the following season, starting on July 1, 1985, against the St. Louis Cardinals. For the season, Youmans went 4-3 with a team-best 2.45 ERA. One of those wins came on the second to last day of the season against Ron Darling and the New York Mets in front of 45,404 at Shea Stadium.

On June 18, 1986, Youmans bested Gooden the first time the two faced off against each other, holding the Mets to only one earned run in 5.1 innings, and drawing a walk in his first at-bat against Gooden. However, they would face off again on August 1, and this time Gooden would emerge victorious. In the hard-throwing right-hander's first full season as a member of the rotation full-time, Youmans threw five double-digit strikeout games and finishing third in the National League with 202 strikeouts. He also led the league with 118 bases on balls, however, limiting his effectiveness and contributing to a 13-12 win–loss record.

Youmans' 1987 season was plagued with injuries, as he visited the disabled list three times. However, he still managed to make 23 starts for the Expos and went 4-1 with a 1.13 ERA and three shutouts in the month of July to earn National League Pitcher of the Month honors.

==== Drug rehab ====
After the 1987 season, Youmans checked into an alcohol rehabilitation center under speculation that he had been forced to do so by Commissioner Peter Ueberroth. Youmans was 3-6 with a 3.21 ERA when his 1988 season was cut short on June 25 by an indefinite suspension for "failing to comply with his drug-testing program." On August 10, the suspension was reduced to sixty days, and the following day, Youmans admitted during a news conference to having used cocaine.

=== Philadelphia Phillies ===
On December 6, 1988, Youmans was traded to the Philadelphia Phillies with Jeff Parrett for Kevin Gross. His 1989 season was marked by injuries, as he was on the disabled list for most of May and pitched his last game on June 24, ending the season with a 1-5 record and 5.70 ERA. He had arthroscopic shoulder surgery on August 22, and never pitched at the major league level again.

=== Comeback attempts ===
Youmans pitched for the independent Sullivan Mountain Lions and Newburgh Night Hawks of the Northeast League in 1995, and became a coach for the Catskill Cougars the following season. He became interim manager of the club during the 1997 season when Edgar Perez was fired as manager on August 4.

He again attempted a comeback in 2003 at age 39 with the Canadian Baseball League's Saskatoon Legends, but only pitched five games before the league folded. In 2008 and 2009, Youmans was the pitching coach for the Joliet Jackhammers of the Northern League.
