= The Grays (baseball team) =

Logo
Cap insignia

Information
- League: Can-Am League
- Ballpark: Traveling team
- Founded: 2005
- League championships: None
- Colors: Black, Gray, Yellow
- Ownership: Can-Am League
- General manager: League-owned, no GM
- Website: Grays Website

The Grays were a professional independent baseball team. They were a traveling team which played in the Canadian-American Association of Professional Baseball, an independent league not affiliated with Major League Baseball. The team started play in the 2005 season due to an uneven number of teams in the Can-Am League after the disbanding of the Bangor Lumberjacks, and were disbanded after the season. The Grays rejoined the league along with the Atlantic City Surf for 2007 to maintain an even number of teams, but were disbanded again following the year. A third incarnation, called the Garden State Grays, played during the 2015 season, to maintain schedule balance after a touring team of players from Japan's Shikoku Island League Plus finished their early season tour of the league.

The team played both home and away games but, since they were a traveling team with no home base, their "home" games were played in the opposing team's stadium with the Grays batting last.

== History ==
The Grays came into existence in April 2005, when the Can-Am League terminated the membership of the Bangor Lumberjacks, who had said they did not have the resources to operate for the season. The team's roster at the time became the roster for the Grays (unlike the year before when the Aces, who replaced the Allentown Ambassadors, were not able to keep their team intact), and Chris Carminucci was hired as their manager.

Playing in a 96-game split season, the Grays were competitive in the first half, finishing with an even 23–23 record and placing 7 games behind the front running Quebec Capitales. However, the bottom fell out in the second half, and the Grays finished with a 10–36 second-half record, 19 games out of first place.

The Grays were disbanded in the 2005–2006 offseason, with part of its roster being absorbed by the expansion Sussex Skyhawks. The Grays were one of two teams to fold that offseason (the Elmira Pioneers was the other; Sussex and the Atlantic League's Nashua Pride joined the league in their places).

Along with the Atlantic City Surf, the Grays were part of the Can-Am League's expansion in 2007. The team failed once again to make the playoffs, and after the season the team joined the New Haven County Cutters and North Shore Spirit in suspending operations and made their players available in a dispersal draft. The Grays did not return in 2009 despite further contraction of the Can-Am League which left an uneven number of teams in the league.
