= Catskill Cougars =

Baseball team in New York, US

- 1995–2000; Mountaindale, New York

Minor league affiliations
- Class: Independent (1995–2000)
- League: Northern League (2000); Northeast League (1997–98); North Atlantic League (1996)

Minor league titles
- League titles (1): 1996

Team data
- Name: Catskill Cougars (1995–2000)
- Colors: Red, gold, black, white
- Ballpark: Baxter Stadium

The Catskill Cougars were a minor-league baseball team based in Mountaindale, New York, in the state's Catskill Mountains region. The Cougars played in the North Atlantic League in 1996 and the Northeast League (later known as the Can-Am League), from 1997–1998, and in the Northern League in 2000. The North Atlantic and Northeast leagues were independent leagues that were not affiliated with Major League Baseball or Minor League Baseball. Following the departure of the Northeast League's Sullivan Mountain Lions after one season in Mountaindale, the Cougars played their home games at Baxter Stadium, and were part-owned by comedian Bill Murray.

== North Atlantic League ==
The Sullivan Mountain Lions played as one of the six teams in the inaugural 1995 season of the Northeast League. They left Mountaindale after only one season and, under new ownership, were replaced by Catskill Cougars, a new team in the year-old North Atlantic League. In their first season, the Cougars boasted the NAL's second-best offense, but also its second-worst pitching staff; they were actually outscored in their league games. However, aided by several victories by default over the bankrupt Nashua Hawks, the Cougars finished 43-35, good enough for second place and a spot in the league championship series against the Massachusetts Mad Dogs, who finished 13 1/2 games ahead of the rest of the NAL. The Cougars then stunned the Mad Dogs by sweeping the best-of-three title series, two games to none, becoming the first pro baseball team based in Sullivan County to win a championship.

The team also did well in attendance, averaging 1,075 fans per game, which ranked third in the six-team league. The Cougars used former major-leaguers Wally Backman and Gates Brown as managers. However, the North Atlantic League filed for bankruptcy and folded after the 1996 season.

== Northeast League ==
By 1997, the Northeast League had grown to 8 teams. The Cougars entered the league, but did not enjoy the same success; they finished the season in the cellar (21-62) and were last in the league in almost all offensive, pitching and defensive categories. They still averaged 925 fans per game. The team featured former major-leaguers Vance Lovelace, Kerwin Moore, and Matt Murray.

In 1998, the Cougars improved on the field, finishing 6th in the league (36-47). The team was led by former Houston Astros player Juan Guerrero. The Cougars drew about 1,000 fans per game. However, other teams in the league such as Allentown, Albany and New Jersey were averaging about 2,300 fans per game, thus breaking the 100,000 fan mark for the season. The Cougars suspended operations after the 1998 season.

== Northern League - East ==
The Quebec Capitales assumed Catskill's spot in the league for the 1999 season, and the Northeast League merged with the successful Northern League to form the Northern League-East. But prior to the start of the 2000 season, the Massachusetts Mad Dogs ran into financial trouble and folded. The league needed a team to fill the eighth slot and the Cougars stepped up. New owner Van Schley gave Baxter Field a $150,000 facelift. But the Cougars finished 7th (38-47), and the break in play caused average attendance to drop to an average of 645, last in the league. Schley estimated losses on the season at about $500,000.

Following the 2000 season, the team stated that it could only compete in 2001 if it pre-sold 250 season tickets. It did not, and ceased operations, along with the Waterbury Spirit. Baxter Field was torn down in 2007, and is now the site of a housing development.

== Notable alumni ==
- Gavin Fingleson, Olympic baseball silver medal winner
- Louie Gold, Played 1 game in centerfield in front of 500 people.
- Mike Babchik, mascot
