= Sullivan Mountain Lions =

Minor league baseball team

Information
- Location: Mountain Dale, New York
- Ballpark: Baxter Field (New York)
- Founded: 1995
- Folded: 1995
- Former league: Northeast League (1995)
- Colors: Blue, light blue, white, black, dark gray, medium gray, light gray
- Ownership: Jay Acton
- General manager: Pete Jameson
- Manager: Ken Oberkfell

The Sullivan Mountain Lions were a minor-league baseball team based near Mountain Dale, Sullivan County, New York. The Mountain Lions played in the inaugural season of the Northeast League, an independent circuit not affiliated with Major League Baseball, in 1995. The Lions played their home games at Baxter Field as one of the NeL's six original teams.

== Lions' den ==
Originally the team planned to play in the Town of Thompson near Kiamesha Lake, but after the local planning board rejected the idea, a park was built on 75 acres near Mountain Dale, a remote but "charming" locale, some eight miles off the nearest highway, New York State Route 17. The plan was to create a mini-Cooperstown with a small museum to help draw tourists to the hamlet. The field was named in honor of Ruth Baxter, who bought the very first pair of season tickets for $125. A manual scoreboard was created in the outfield, bleachers were purchased from Aqueduct Raceway and blue plastic seats installed behind home plate, bringing the capacity to 3,500.

== On the field ==
Jay Acton was the club's owner, hiring former major leaguer Ken Oberkfell as the manager. The Lions also featured former MLB pitcher Floyd Youmans; unfortunately, he appeared in only two games, and the team's combined ERA was a bloated 6.15, second-worst in the league. The offense was even worse, managing barely four runs a game, last in the NeL, despite Chris Kokinda winning the league batting title with a .370 average. Sullivan finished the season with a 23–43 record, fifth in the six-team league, ahead of only the disastrous Yonkers Hoot Owls franchise.

Despite the poor play and their ballpark's out-of-the-way location, the Mountain Lions (aided by bringing in groups from the many summer camps in the area) averaged more than 1,200 fans per game, third-highest in the Northeast League. “But there was no clubhouse, so players had to dress at the Mountain Dale Firehouse and drive down the road to the park,” said Mike McGuire, a third-base coach with the Lions and later a Sullivan County Judge. “But by the end of that first season paychecks were bouncing, vendors weren’t being paid, contractors weren’t being paid.” The Mountain Lions were shifted to West Warwick, Rhode Island for the 1996 season, becoming the Rhode Island Tigersharks, and a new ownership group brought the Catskill Cougars to Baxter Field.
