= Sussex Skyhawks =

Logo
Cap insignia

Information
- League: Canadian American Association of Professional Baseball
- Location: Augusta, New Jersey
- Ballpark: Skylands Park
- Founded: 2006
- Folded: 2011
- Nickname: The Hawks
- League championships: 2008
- Former name: Sussex Skyhawks (2006–10)
- Colors: Sky Blue, Black, White, Silver
- Ownership: Floyd Hall
- Media: New Jersey Herald

The Sussex Skyhawks were a professional baseball team that played at Skylands Park in Augusta, New Jersey. The team was part of the Canadian American Association of Professional Baseball, an independent minor baseball league also referred to as the Can-Am League, from their inaugural season in 2006 until 2010. The team was owned by a group led by Floyd Hall, who also owns the New Jersey Jackals. The team was formed in part due to their home park's previous tenant, the New Jersey Cardinals, relocating to University Park, Pennsylvania following the 2005 New York–Penn League season to become the State College Spikes.

After the announcement of a new team coming to the area, the ownership group—which was known as Sussex Professional Baseball—held an online contest for fans to try to name the team. On January 25, 2006, "Sussex Skyhawks" was chosen as the winning name. The Skyhawk name represented the Skylands Region of northwestern New Jersey, where the team was playing, and Sussex was chosen to represent Sussex County, New Jersey, where Augusta is located.

== History ==
=== 2006 ===
For their inaugural season, the Skyhawks hired Brian Drahman, who had been the pitching coach for the New Jersey Jackals, as their manager. The team took the place of the Elmira Pioneers, who left the professional ranks to join the New York Collegiate Baseball League, and their roster was composed largely of players who had been a part of The Grays, the league's 2005 traveling team.

Due to poor weather and other factors, the Skyhawks attendance was disappointing early in the inaugural 2006 season, until the team found itself in a tight, multi-team race for the first-half pennant. With a 23–19 record into the first half's final weekend, Sussex had a chance to win the first half if they could take two out of three games from the North Shore Spirit. Instead, they were swept, and the Skyhawks tumbled all the way to fifth place, one of six teams in a three-game knot at the top of the standings.

The Skyhawks never recovered, and the second half was a disaster as Sussex lost twenty games in a row at one point in 2006. Sussex finished with a 9–26 mark in the second half and a league-worst 32–48 overall. The team drew 85,126 fans to Skylands Park, an average of 2,183.

=== 2007 ===
The Skyhawks' 2007 season started poorly; they lost 10 of their first 11 games including a sweep at the hands of the traveling Grays franchise. Despite numerous roster changes, Sussex finished last in the season's first half with a 15–31 record. The team showed slight improvement in the second half, tying for eighth place with a 19–28 record, but the overall 34–59 record remained worst in the league.

The team saw a significant increase in overall attendance, drawing 101,638 fans over the course of the year. However, the average attendance declined due to the team having more home games in 2007 than they did in 2006. Both figures ranked seventh in the Can-Am League.

=== 2008 ===
In the offseason, Brian Drahman and the entire coaching staff was fired. To replace Drahman, former Houston Astros manager Hal Lanier was named as the Skyhawks' skipper. Lanier brought along Nick Belmonte to serve as director of player personnel. "You had to convince players things were going to be different (to get them signed)," said Belmonte, who has been teaming with Lanier for well over a decade. "Even though there weren’t superstars, they had tough outs (batting) 1-9. I think that's what has carried them through."

After a slow start which saw Sussex end the month of May with a 3–8 record, the team turned things around behind clean-up hitter Matt Weston (second in the league with 22 home runs) and closer Matt Petrusek (22 saves, tied for first). By the final weekend of the first half, the Skyhawks were 25–19, just three games back of the first-place Québec Capitales—who were in Skylands Park for a four-game series. In a similar ending to 2006's first half, however, the Capitales won three of four, and Sussex had to settle for a three-way third place tie with their sister team the Jackals and the Atlantic City Surf.

The Hawks got off to another slow start in the second half; their record was just 6–11 at the end of July, and hopes of a playoff spot seemed dashed. Then, in August, the Skyhawks got red hot: they put together a seven-game winning streak and two streaks of five wins in a row, including the last five games of the regular season. Sussex wound up in a three-way tie for the second half title with Quebec and the Worcester Tornadoes with a 27–20 record. The Skyhawks' combined record was enough to qualify them for the playoffs, and Lanier won manager of the year.

In the league semifinals against Worcester, the Skyhawks dropped the opener of the best-of-five series, 3–2, before roaring back to win three in a row. Pitching, which had been the Hawks' biggest weakness in 2008 (their 5.03 ERA was second-worst in the league) came through against the Tornadoes with 3-2 and 4-0 wins in games two and three. In Game 4, Worcester jumped to a 5–0 lead before Sussex scored six runs in the fourth en route to an 8–5 win, and a berth in the Can-Am League Championship Series against Quebec.

In Game 1 at Skylands Park, the circuit's top pitcher, Quebec's Michel Simard, hooked up in a pitcher's duel with Kyle Ruwe of Sussex. Finally, in the bottom of the tenth, Jorge Moreno's single scored Michael Perodin to give the Skyhawks a 3–2 win. In the second game, Sussex scored four runs in the first inning, then watched Quebec come back to take a 5–4 lead. The lead seesawed back and forth until Matt Weston's two-RBI single in the eighth sealed the Skyhawks' 8–6 win.

On September 12, 2008, the Skyhawks met Les Capitales Stade Municipal in Quebec, looking for an improbable sweep in the Championship Series. In game three, the Skyhawks offense bludgeoned the Caps pitchers in the early going, plating ten runs in the first four innings and cruising to a 10–5 win, becoming the first championship team to play in Skylands Park since the New Jersey Cardinals won a New York–Penn League title in their inaugural season in 1994. The Skyhawks became the fifth New Jersey team to win an independent league championship joining the aforementioned Jackals and Surf as well as the Newark Bears and Somerset Patriots of the Atlantic League.

For Sussex, the only downside was the tiny crowds at their home playoff games: barely 2,000 for the four games combined, in a 4,000-seat stadium. (Minor league baseball playoff games often draw poorly, however, due to a lack of promotion.) Their regular season average attendance slid to 1,713, next-to-last, ahead of only the Nashua Pride.

=== 2009 ===
Featuring nine players from the prior year's championship team, the Skyhawks got off to a 4–1 start, taking three of four on the road against the Brockton Rox, then won their home opener, 4–3, against Worcester. But a slump during which Sussex lost seven of eight games dropped the Skyhawks below .500, and they never recovered, ending the first half of the season at 21–26, tied for last place in the Can-Am League.

In the second half, Sussex opened with two victories against Worcester, but then dropped 17 of its next 20 games. The team ended up 17–30 in the second half; its combined record of 38-56 placed the Skyhawks fifth overall, one of the two Can-Am teams left out of the playoffs.

The team's average attendance dropped for the fourth straight season to 1,695. A total of 79,663 fans came to Skylands Park during the year. After the season, manager Hal Lanier announced he would not return for 2010.

=== 2010 ===
The Skyhawks hired manager Ed Ott for the 2010 season. Ott was a former MLB catcher for the Pirates and Angels between 1974 and 1981. The team started out strong, going 25–21 in the first half, good enough for 3rd place overall. However, the team struggled mightily in the second half of the year with a miserable 10–35 record, by far the worst in the league. With a final record of 35–56, the Skyhawks finished in last place overall with three fewer wins than in '09. They also saw their overall attendance drop to an all-time low of 71,826 (1,670 per game).

After the 2010 season, the Skyhawks' lease at Skylands Park ended. With attendance falling and the team losing money, the ownership group began to seek a buyer so they could focus their resources on their primary team, the New Jersey Jackals. Hall was not able to find a buyer to keep the team operational for the 2011 season, therefore, on January 11, 2011, the Skyhawks announced they were suspending operations.

== Final 2010 roster ==
Sussex Skyhawks Roster
Active (22-man) Roster	Coaching Staff
Pitchers: 24 (United States) Dan Berlind; 00 (Dominican Republic) Duaner Sánchez; 29 (United States) Jusef Frias; 00 (United States) Charlie Gordon; 18 (United States) Kevin Gunter; 21 (United States) Jeff Icenogle; 27 (United States) Donald Jordat; 16 (United States) Jared Locke; 14 (United States) Trevor Marcotte; 11 (United States) Matt Salvato; 06 (United States) Tim Stringer; 10 (United States) Mike Vicaro; Catchers: 00 (United States) Jonathan Gossard; 02 (United States) Anthony Sosnoskie; 00 (United States) Ryan Boelsen; Infielders: 30 (United States) Chase Fontaine; 13 (United States) Nick Giarraputo; 20 (United States) Mike Megale; 03 (United States) Joe Persichina; 05 (United States) Rene Ruiz; 31 (United States) Kris Sanchez; Outfielders: 25 (United States) Vincent Blue; 09 (United States) Carl Loadenthal; 23 (United States) Caleb Stewart; 07 (United States) Kraig Binick	Manager: 00 (United States) Ed Ott; Coaches: 00 (United States) Hunter Vick (Assistant); 00 (United States) Richard Morris (Pitching Coach); Disabled list; ‡ Inactive list; >§ Suspended list; updated 2011-04-02 Transactions

Bill Driskell (Assistant)

== Retired numbers ==
3

Ron Perodin
OF

== Uniform ==
The Skyhawks uniform is white with blue pinstripes for home games and grey for away games. The home uniform has the word "Skyhawks" across the front and number on the back. Road jerseys say "Sussex" on the front. The alternate jersey is blue with Skyhawks and the number on the front, and the number also on the back. Black home hats with an "S" and a talon holding a baseball coming through the center. Same hat (except in grey) on the road. Their logo is the word "Skyhawks" in script in light blue with black and white outline superimposed over the depiction of a light blue bird in flight, holding a baseball in its talons.

== Season-by-season records ==
Sussex Skyhawks
Season	W - L Record	Ranking	Finishing Results
2006	32-48	6th in CanAm League	Did not qualify for playoffs
2007	34-59	7th in CanAm League	Did not qualify for playoffs
2008	52-39	2nd in CanAm League	Won League Championship over Quebec
2009	38-56	6th in CanAm League	Did not qualify for playoffs
2010	35-56	7th in CanAm League	Did not qualify for playoffs
Totals	191-258	-

Achievements
Preceded by Nashua Pride; 2007	Can-Am League Champions; Sussex Skyhawks; 2008	Succeeded by Québec Capitales; 2009
