= Trey Beamon =

American baseball player (born 1974)

- Outfielder
- Born: February 11, 1974 (age 51); Dallas, Texas, U.S.
- Batted: Left Threw: Right

MLB debut
- August 4, 1996, for the Pittsburgh Pirates

Last MLB appearance
- September 27, 1998, for the Detroit Tigers

MLB statistics
- Batting average: .253
- Home runs: 0
- Runs batted in: 15
- Stats at Baseball Reference

Teams
- Pittsburgh Pirates (1996); San Diego Padres (1997); Detroit Tigers (1998)

Clifford "Trey" Beamon (born February 11, 1974) is an American former professional baseball player. He spent three seasons in Major League Baseball (MLB) as a left fielder and right fielder. Beamon bats from the left side, throws with his right hand, and was at one time listed as 6 ft 3 in (1.91 m) tall and weighing 210 pounds.

== Career summary ==
After a prep career at W. T. White High School in Dallas, the Pirates chose Beamon in the second round of the 1992 MLB draft, with the 61st overall selection. Beamon advanced quickly through the minors, and after he batted .334 in 1995 as a 21-year-old with the Calgary Cannons of the AAA Pacific Coast League, Baseball America honored him as the organization's top prospect.

Beamon struggled to establish himself on the MLB, however. He appeared in 24 games with the Pirates in 1996 before being traded, with Angelo Encarnación to the San Diego Padres, in exchange for Mark Smith and Hal Garrett. He appeared in 43 games with the Padres the next year before being traded again; the Padres sent Beamon and Tim Worrell to the Detroit Tigers, receiving Dan Miceli, Donne Wall, and Ryan Balfe in return. Beamon appeared in 28 games with the Tigers in 1998, his final season in the major leagues. For his career, he compiled a .253 batting average, a .306 on-base percentage, and a .310 slugging percentage in 158 at bats.

Beamon continued his professional career in the minor leagues and in independent leagues. He was a Northern League all-star with the Allentown Ambassadors in 2000, leading that league in batting average (.381) and total hits (115). He was also a United League Baseball All-Star in 2006, his final season, as a member of the Alexandria Aces.

In the off-season, Beamon resides in Mesquite, Texas.
