= Adirondack Lumberjacks =

Baseball team in Glens Falls, New York, US

- Logo

Information
- League: Northern League (1999–2002)
- Location: Glens Falls, New York
- Ballpark: East Field
- Founded: 1995
- Folded: 2002
- League championships: 1995, 2000
- Former league: Northeast League (1995–1998)
- Colors: Forest green, black, gray, white, tan
- Media: The Post-Star

The Adirondack Lumberjacks were an independent professional baseball team based in Glens Falls, New York. The team moved to Bangor, Maine, and became the Bangor Lumberjacks following the 2002 season. The team won the inaugural 1995 Northeast League Championship and the 2000 Northern League Championship.

== Results ==
=== Regular season ===
Season	Games	Won	Lost	Percentage	First Half	Second Half	Home	Road	Standings
1995	69	42	27	.609	—	—			3rd
1996	80	30	50	.375	—	—			5th
1997	83	45	38	.542	—	—			3rd, North Division
1998	84	34	50	.405	15-27	19-23			4th/4th, North Division
1999	86	43	43	.500	22-21	21-22			1st/3rd, North Division
2000	85	48	37	.565	27-15	21-22			1st/4th, North Division
2001	89	37	52	.416	17-28	20-24			3rd/2nd, North Division
2002	90	52	38	.578	24-21	28-17			2nd/1st, North Division
Totals	666	331	335	.497	—	—			—

=== Postseason ===
Season	First Round	East Divisional Championship	Northeast League Championship	Northern League Championship
1995	W, 1-0, Mohawk Valley Landsharks	—	W, 2-1 Albany-Colonie Diamond Dogs	—
1996	Did Not Make Playoffs			
1997	Did Not Make Playoffs			
1998	Did Not Make Playoffs			
1999	L, 0-3, Albany-Colonie Diamond Dogs	—	—	—
2000	W, 3-1, Les Capitales de Québec	W, 3-1, Elmira Pioneers	—	W, 3-0, Duluth–Superior Dukes
2001	Did Not Make Playoffs			
2002	W, 3-2, Les Capitales de Québec	L, 2-3, New Jersey Jackals	—	—

== History ==
=== 1995 ===
The Lumberjacks along with the Albany-Colonie Diamond Dogs, Mohawk Valley Land Sharks, Newburgh Night Hawks, Sullivan Mountain Lions, and the Yonkers Hoot Owls form the Northeast League. In their first season they posted a record of 42 victories and 27 defeats under manager Dave LaPoint and earned a playoff berth via the wild card. In the one game wild card playoff the Jacks defeated the Mohawk Valley Land Sharks 8-3 to move onto the Championship Series against their Northway Rivals, the Albany-Colonie Diamond Dogs.

The Lumberjacks first beat the Diamond Dogs, 11-1, and lost at home, 7-5. They won the decisive third match 8-5, to win the inaugural Northeast League Championship. Third baseman Bo Durkac received Most Valuable Player Honors, and was signed to a minor league contract with the new Arizona Diamondbacks franchise in the off season.

== See also ==
- Bangor Lumberjacks

Achievements
Preceded by First	Northeast League Champions; Adirondack Lumberjacks; 1995	Succeeded by Albany-Colonie Diamond Dogs; 1996
Preceded by Albany-Colonie Diamond Dogs; 1999	Northern League Champions; Adirondack Lumberjacks; 2000	Succeeded by New Jersey Jackals; 2001
