= Bangor Lumberjacks =

Information
- League: Northeast League (2003–2004)
- Location: Bangor, Maine
- Founded: 2003
- Folded: 2004
- Former ballpark(s): Larry Mahaney Diamond (2003); Winkin Sports Complex (2004)
- Colors: Black, Red, Forest Green, and White

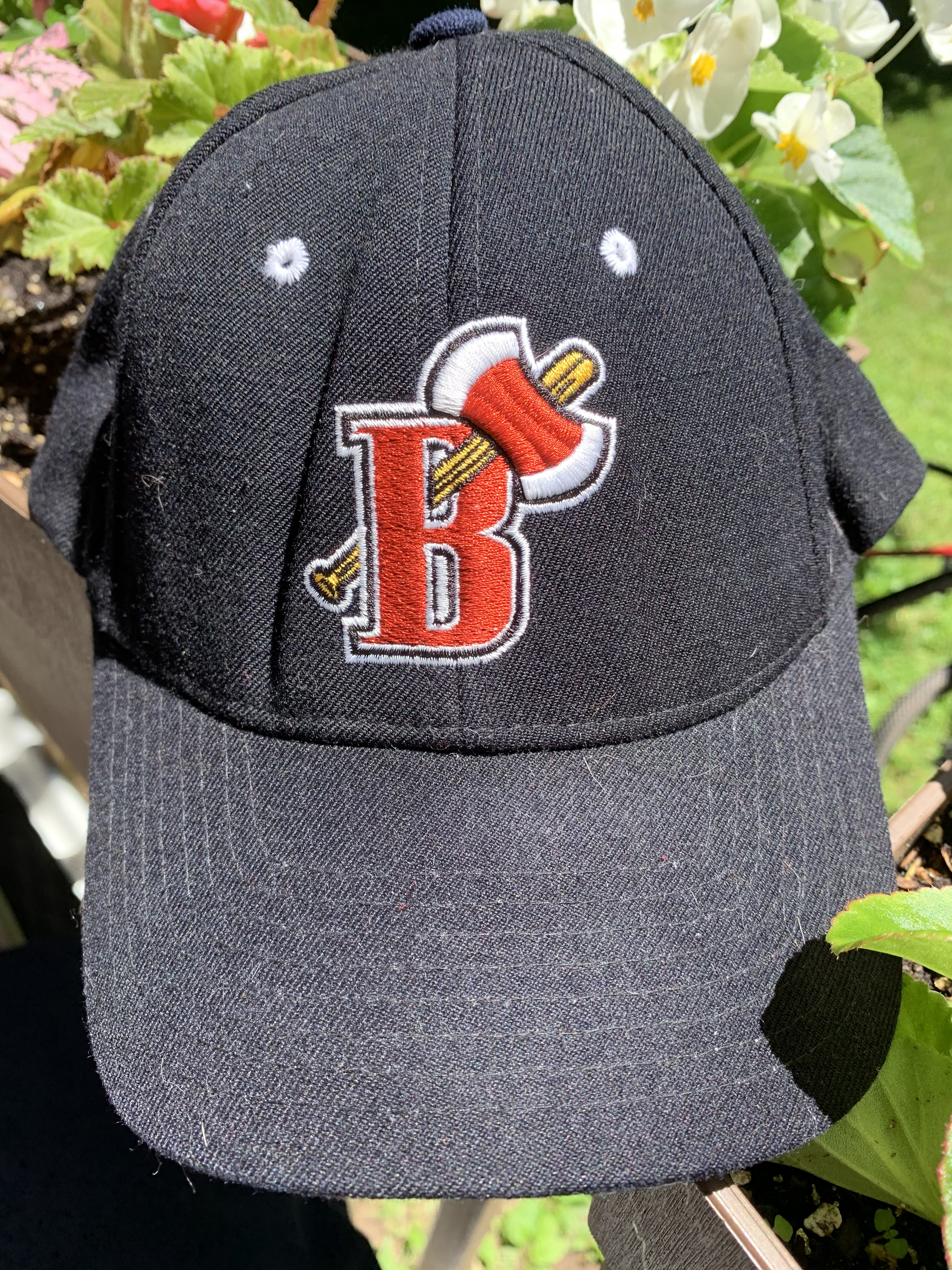
Bangor Lumberjacks cap

The Bangor Lumberjacks were an independent minor league baseball team in the Northeast League that was based in Bangor, Maine. Prior to 2003, the Lumberjacks played in Glens Falls, New York and were known as the Adirondack Lumberjacks. The team moved to Maine following the 2002 season. In 2003, the Lumberjacks played in Orono at Larry Mahaney Diamond and in 2004 they played at Bangor's Winkin Sports Complex. Kash Beauchamp served as the team's manager.

For their first year the Lumberjacks finished with a 42–49 record. The next year, the team finished with a 56-36 overall record, good for second best in the league behind the New Jersey Jackals. The Lumberjacks met the Jackals in the first round of the playoffs and were quickly eliminated, losing in four games despite having the pitchers with the two best ERA (JC Huguet and Jerry Long) in the league and postseason All-Star Derry Hammond, who hit 23 home runs. Whereas the Lumberjacks had won three league championships in New York, the team failed to win one in their two years in Maine.

The 2003 roster featured former Major League pitcher Jeff Sparks who had spent parts of two seasons (23 appearances) with the Tampa Bay Devil Rays. In 17 games with the Lumberjacks, Sparks logged 36 2/3 innings with a 4–1 record and an ERA of 1.23.

In 2004, the Lumberjacks' lone player with MLB service was left-handed pitcher Clayton Andrews who had appeared in eight games in 2000 with the Toronto Blue Jays. A regular in Bangor's starting rotation, Andrews posted a 7–3 record with a 4.06 ERA in 84 1/2 innings.

The Northeast League stripped Bangor of its membership after the 2004 season and the Lumberjacks folded. The team's roster after the folding comprised the 2005 roster for the Can-Am League's traveling team, and later became the initial roster for the Sussex Skyhawks who debuted in 2006.

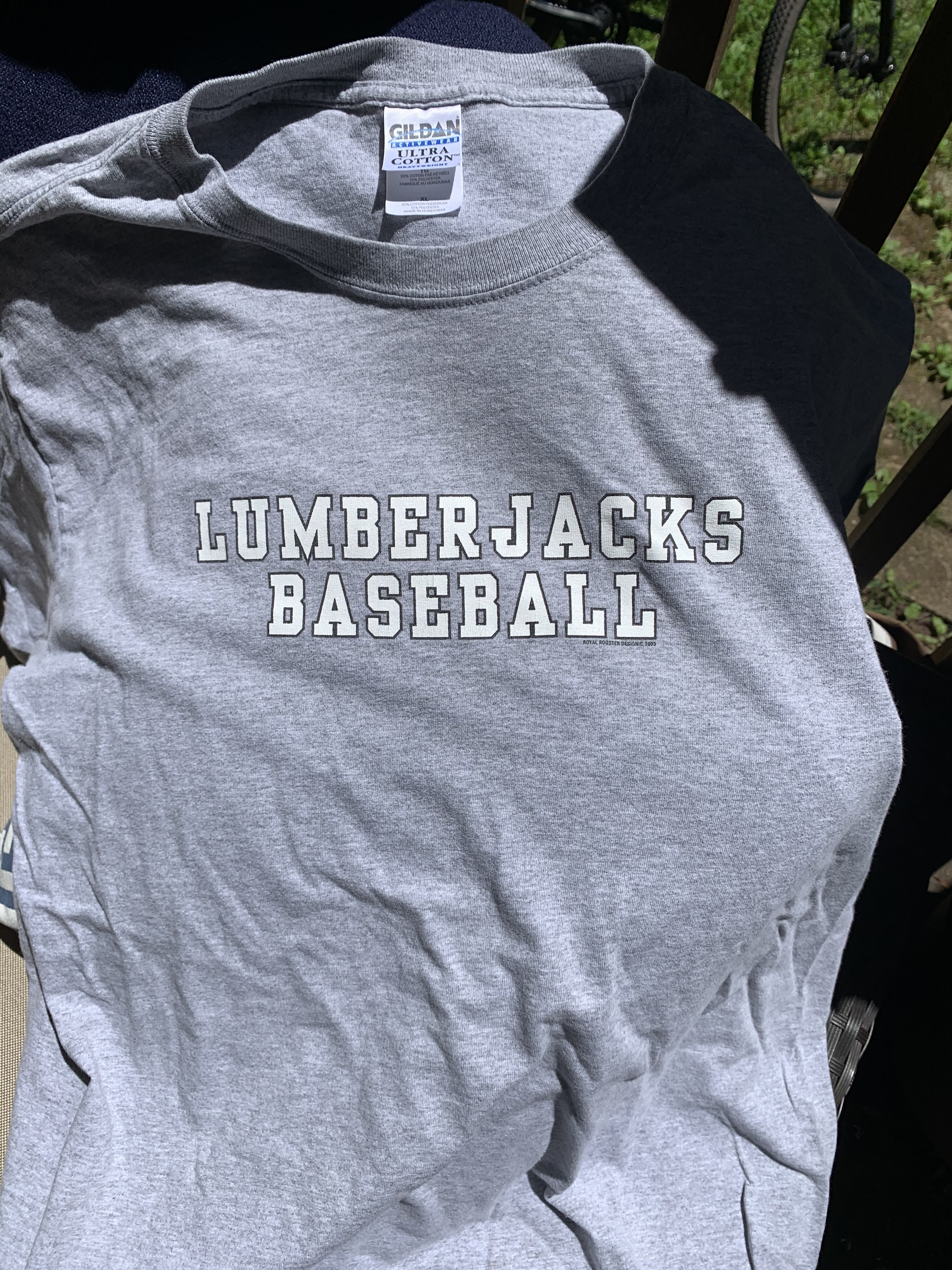
Bangor Lumberjacks shirt

== Bangor franchises timeline ==
Year(s)	# Yrs.	Team	Level	League
1894–1896	3	Bangor Millionaires	Class B	New England League
1897	1	Bangor Millionaires	Independent	Maine State League
1901	1	Bangor	Independent	New England League
1907	1	Bangor Cubs	Class D	Maine State League
1908	1	Bangor White Sox	Class D	Maine State League
1913	1	Bangor Maroons	Class D	New Brunswick-Maine League
1994–1997	3	Bangor Blue Ox	Independent	Northeast League
2003–2004	2	Bangor Lumberjacks	Independent	Northeast League

== See also ==
- Adirondack Lumberjacks
