= Jeff Mutis =

American baseball player (born 1966)

- Pitcher
- Born: December 20, 1966 (age 59); Allentown, Pennsylvania, U.S.
- Batted: Left Threw: Left

MLB debut
- June 15, 1991, for the Cleveland Indians

Last MLB appearance
- July 31, 1994, for the Florida Marlins

MLB statistics
- Win–loss record: 4–11
- Earned run average: 6.48
- Strikeouts: 73
- Stats at Baseball Reference

Teams
- Cleveland Indians (1991–1993); Florida Marlins (1994)

Jeff Mutis (born December 20, 1966) is an American former professional baseball pitcher.

== Early life and education ==
Mutis was born in Allentown, Pennsylvania, on December 20, 1996. He attended Allentown Central Catholic High School, where he was recruited heavily by collegiate baseball programs at Seton Hall University, Clemson University, and Rollins College.

Despite telling the New York Yankees in the 15th round that his commitment to Lafayette College was strong, Mutis was drafted by the Cleveland Indians in the 34th round of the 1985 Major League Baseball draft; however, he chose not to sign with the Indians.

== Career ==
Mutis was again drafted by the Indians in the first round (27th pick) of the 1988 Major League Baseball draft. On July 17, 1993, Mutis pitched a complete game shutout, allowing four hits and striking out two in a 3-0 Indians win over the Los Angeles Angels. In 1993, he was selected from waivers by the Florida Marlins, and he played his final major league game with the Marlins on July 31, 1994.

Mutis was released by the Marlins on July 15, 1995, following a move from a starting pitcher to closer. Mutis recorded two saves in 27 games, earning a 3.72 average with the Triple-A Charlotte Knights, but was pitching through back pain. He subsequently signed with the St. Louis Cardinals organization for the 1996 season, pitching with the Triple-A Louisville Redbirds. It was his last season in affiliated baseball.

In 1997, Mutis signed with the independent Allentown Ambassadors of the Northeast League as the team's first player who had competed at the MLB level since its 1962 founding. Mutis started two games for the Ambassadors before retiring.

The same year, Mutis was awarded his degree from Lafayette, where he majored in business and economics.
