= Leo García =

Leo García may refer to:

- Leo García (singer) (born 1970), Argentine singer
- Leo García (baseball) (born 1962), Dominican-born Major League Baseball player
