= Brian Drahman =

American baseball player (born 1966)

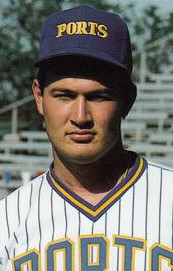
- Drahman in 1988
- Pitcher
- Born: November 7, 1966 (age 59); Kenton, Kentucky, U.S.
- Batted: Right Threw: Right

MLB debut
- April 16, 1991, for the Chicago White Sox

Last MLB appearance
- July 5, 1994, for the Florida Marlins

MLB statistics
- Win–loss record: 3–2
- Earned run average: 3.54
- Strikeouts: 29

CPBL statistics
- Win–loss record: 10–6
- Earned run average: 2.11
- Strikeouts: 139
- Stats at Baseball Reference

Teams
- Chicago White Sox (1991–1993); Florida Marlins (1994); Uni-President Lions (1998–1999)

Brian Stacy Drahman (born November 7, 1966) is an American former right-handed baseball pitcher. He played in Major League Baseball (MLB) for the Chicago White Sox and Florida Marlins. He was born in Kenton, Kentucky but raised in Fort Lauderdale, Florida.

== Career ==
He was selected in the second round of the 1986 amateur draft by the Milwaukee Brewers out of Miami-Dade College. He immediately joined the Helena Gold Sox in the Rookie-level Pioneer League, then went 4–6 with a 5.92 earned run average (ERA) over 18 appearances (10 starts). He struck out 40 in 65.1 innings pitched and collected a 1.71 WHIP. Milwaukee promoted him to single-A for the 1987 campaign, with the Midwest League Beloit Brewers. Drahman went 6–5 with a 2.16 ERA in 46 appearances. He had 18 saves and struck out 60 in 79 innings with a 1.08 WHIP.

In 1998, Drahman played high-A level with the Stockton Ports, going 4–5 through 44 relief appearances with a 2.02 ERA and a 1.35 WHIP. He struck out 50 batters in 62.1 innings, but did not earn a promotion, starting the following season again with the Ports. He went 3–2 in a dozen appearances with a 3.25 ERA before earning a callup to the AA level, for the El Paso Diablos in the Texas League. He went 3–4 and his ERA ballooned to 7.26 in 19 relief appearances. With the Brewers needing a veteran fifth starter for its pennant drive, he was dealt to the Chicago White Sox for Jerry Reuss at the trade deadline on July 31, 1989. Drahman was sent back to the A+ level, and played with the Sarasota White Sox in the Florida State League. He went 0–1 over seven games, with a 3.24 ERA.

Drahman joined the Birmingham Barons in the double-A level Southern League for the 1990 campaign, spending the entire season with the club. He had a 6–4 record over 50 games (49 in relief), along with a 4.08 ERA and a 1.26 WHIP, striking out 72 in 90.1 innings pitched. In 1991, he opened the season with the White Sox. He blew a save in his first appearance then gave up five earned runs in 0.2 innings his next time out before settling down to earn a win on April 21. In that contest, he struck out one and allowed no hits or walks in the ninth before Lance Johnson hit a walk-off single in the bottom half for a 5–4 win over the Detroit Tigers. Overall, he played 28 games for the Sox, going 3–2 with a 3.23 ERA and a 1.109 WHIP, striking out 18 in 30.2 innings.

"I didn't have a stellar season", Drahman told the Sun-Sentinel in 1991, "but I did prove I can pitch at the major-league level and that was important."

He also played part of the season with the Vancouver Canadians, going 2–3 with a 4.44 ERA in 22 games. He earned 12 saves, striking out 17 batters in 24.1 innings.

In 1992, Drahman spent most of his season with the Vancouver club in the Pacific Coast League as that team's closer. He went 2–4 with a 2.01 ERA and 30 saves. He appeared 48 times, earning 34 strikeouts in 58.1 innings with a 1.29 WHIP. He also briefly played with the Sox, earning a 2.57 ERA over seven innings in five relief appearances. He played most of the following campaign with the Nashville Sounds in the American Association, going 9–4 with a 2.91 ERA and 20 saves. Over 54 games, he earned a 1.400 WHIP and struck out 59 in 55.2 innings. He also pitched 5.1 innings for Chicago, allowing no earned runs and striking out three. The Florida Marlins purchased his contract directly following the 1993 season.

In 1994, Drahman played with the Edmonton Trappers, Florida's triple-A affiliate in the Pacific Coast League. He went 3–2 with 13 saves in 45 games, with a 4.77 ERA and a 1.41 WHIP. He struck out 62 batters in 60.1 innings. He earned a call-up to the Marlins early in June, staying through the beginning of July. He made nine appearances with the Fish, pitching 13 innings in total. In hindsight, all of his playing time was "low leverage." His best showing was on July 2, when he allowed one earned run in three innings of relief work, striking out three in a 5–0 loss to the Atlanta Braves. He earned a 6.23 ERA while with the Marlins, with a 1.62 WHIP and seven strikeouts. It was during this, his last major league season, where Drahman finally exceeded rookie limits.

Although he last played Major League Baseball at 27, Drahman played seven more seasons of competitive ball, between the Charlotte Knights (Marlins, International League, 21 games, 2–1, 6.30, 1.950), the Oklahoma City 89ers (Texas Rangers, American Association, 22 games, 2–2, 3.09, 1.56), Indianapolis Indians (Cincinnati Reds, 5 games, 0-0, 4.50, 1.875), the Las Vegas Stars (San Diego Padres, Pacific Coast League, 42 games, 3–1, 5.33, 1.69), the Allentown Ambassadors (unaffiliated, Northeast League, 24 games, 11–9, 4.25, 1.388), and the Dos Laredos Tecolotes (unaffiliated, Mexican League, 29 games, 7–9, 3.72, 1.300).
