= Fleming Field (Yonkers) =

Baseball stadium in Yonkers, New York

Coordinates: 40.931628°N 73.882782°W

- Interactive map of Fleming Field
- Location: Yonkers, New York
- Capacity: 500
- Surface: Dirt

Tenant
- Yonkers Hoot Owls (1995)

Fleming Field is a baseball stadium in Yonkers, New York, and was briefly home of the independent league Yonkers Hoot Owls in 1995.

The ballpark was constructed and mainly suited for high school and amateur baseball; it was home of the semi-pro Yonkers Chippewas in the 1950s and 60s. The King and His Court, the four-man barnstorming softball team, also played there in the 1960s.

However, in 1995 it would host minor league baseball for the first time. The newly formed Independent Northeast League (now known as the Can-Am League) consisted of six teams, all from New York State, and was looking to have a presence near New York City.

Literary agent Adele Leone was approached by the league after expressing an interest in owning a team and shortly thereafter the Hoot Owls were formed.

The park was not really suited for such a high level of baseball; it had concrete slab seating, no permanent concessions, no permanent restrooms, no dugouts and at the time, no permanent lighting. Leone would spend thousands of dollars of her own money to install permanent lights for the field. The most noticeable defect in terms of a professional team playing on the field was that Fleming Field did not (and does not) have infield grass, making the Hoot Owls one of the very few teams in American professional baseball history to play their home games on an all-dirt infield. (All-dirt fields are common elsewhere, such as in Asia.)

After a terrible 1995 season, marred by a 12–52 record and attendance of less than 200 fans per game, Leone had no choice but to fold the team. Since then, Fleming Field has gone back to its roots and continues to host amateur games.
