= Little Falls Mets =

- 1977–1988; Little Falls, New York

Minor league affiliations
- Previous classes: Short-Season A
- Previous leagues: New York–Penn League

Major league affiliations
- Team: New York Mets

Minor league titles
- League titles: 1 (1984)

Team data
- Colors: Light blue, orange, white
- Ballpark: Little Falls Veterans Memorial Park

The Little Falls Mets were a minor league baseball team located in Little Falls, New York. The team played in the New York–Penn League, and were affiliated with the New York Mets. Their home stadium was Little Falls Veterans Memorial Park.

== Notable players ==
Notable Little Falls Mets alumni include:

- Shawn Abner – 1st overall baseball amateur draft pick in 1984
- Rick Aguilera – former Major League relief pitcher
- Wally Backman – former Major League second baseman and manager
- Billy Beane – former Major League outfielder and Oakland A's general manager
- Kevin Elster – former Major League shortstop
- Dwight Gooden – former Major League pitcher
- Todd Hundley – - former Major League catcher
- Lloyd McClendon – former Major League player and manager
- J. P. Ricciardi – former Toronto Blue Jays general manager
- Steven Brigham – owner of EB Sports equipment company
