= Allentown Ambassadors =

Baseball team

- 1997–2003; Allentown, Pennsylvania

Minor league affiliations
- Class: Independent (1997–2003)
- League: Northeast League (2003); Northern League (2000–2002); Northeast League (1997–1999)

Minor league titles
- Division titles: 1999

Team data
- Name: Allentown Ambassadors (1997–2003)
- Colors: Black, red, blue, white
- Ballpark: Bicentennial Park (1997–2003)

The Allentown Ambassadors were an independent baseball team that competed in the Northeast League and the Northern League from 1997 until 2003. They played their home games at Bicentennial Park in Allentown, Pennsylvania.

== History ==
In 1996, Allentown was granted a franchise in the Northeast League, replacing the Rhode Island Tiger Sharks. The team faced difficulties before their inaugural season even began; 16-year Major League veteran infielder Ken Oberkfell was named the team's first manager in the summer of 1996. On December 19, 1996, Oberkfell would leave to become the manager of the Piedmont Boll Weevils of the South Atlantic League.

Former Major League catcher Ed Ott would be named Oberkfell's replacement for their inaugural 1997 season and the Ambassadors finished the year a 39–43 record, leading the league in runs per game, batting average, on-base percentage, and slugging percentage. The Ambassadors drew 69,537, finishing third in the league in that category.

In 1998, the team continued to improve, sporting an impressive 52–32 record but lost in the first round of the playoffs to the New Jersey Jackals. They led the league in attendance with an impressive 122,000 fans on the season, an average of about 2,900 fans per game. In 1999, the league merged with the very successful Northern League to play in the new Northern League East division. The Ambassadors won the regular season title with a record of 47–39 but would lose in the playoffs, again to New Jersey.

In 2000, the Ambassadors saw their record fall to 42–43 and they missed the playoffs. Also, attendance started to slip as other teams in the league all started seeing increases in attendance. 2001 was another tough year for Allentown, once again in terms of attendance and also their record fell to 43–47, which was last in the South Division. In 2002, things took a drastic turn for the worse. The Ambassadors finished a miserable 26–64 on the season, 36 1/2 games out of first place. They were also at the bottom of the league in attendance, averaging only about 1,700 fans per contest, which was no longer comparable with other Northeastern League teams.

By 2003, the team only made minimal strides in terms of their on-field play. They once again finished last in their division with a 32–58 record, 20 1/2 games out of first. However, their biggest loss was in the attendance category. Once again, most league teams were averaging over 150,000 fans per season, but Allentown saw only about 40,000 fans for the year, or 888 fans per game. The attendance numbers were the fourth-worst in all of independent baseball. Grammy Award winning recording artist John Mayer performed at the park during the Ambassadors final season. Mayer's concert represented the most attended event in the venue's history.

Just weeks before the Ambassadors were to begin their 2004 season, team owner Peter Karoly announced that he was folding the team as the Ambassadors filed for bankruptcy while simultaneously announcing his support for an affiliated baseball proposal from a group led by Craig Stein and Joseph Finley, who were working on obtaining a $12 million grant from the state for a new baseball facility. The roster, for the most part, was dispersed through all the teams in the league, and whatever was left (with the addition of a few free agents) became part of a traveling team known as The Aces. The Aces played one season before the league replaced them with the Worcester Tornadoes.

In April 2008, professional baseball returned to Allentown, when the Lehigh Valley IronPigs, the AAA-level Philadelphia Phillies team, began play at Coca-Cola Park, a new, 8,500-capacity stadium.

== Results ==
=== Regular season ===
Season	Games	Won	Lost	Percentage	Standings
1997	82	39	43	.476	7th, Northeast League
1998*	84	52	32	.619	T-2nd, Northeast League
1999*	86	47	39	.547	1st, Northern League East
2000	84	41	43	.488	5th, Northern League East
2001*	84	41	43	.488	5th, Northern League East
2002	90	26	64	.289	7th, Northern League East
2003	90	32	58	.356	8th, Northeast League
Totals	600	278	322	.463	—

*Denotes Playoff Team

=== Post Season ===
Season	East Divisional Championship	Northeast League Championship	Northern League Championship
1998	L, 3–0, New Jersey Jackals	—	-
1999	L, 3–0, New Jersey Jackals	—	-
2001	L, 3–0, Elmira Pioneers	—	-

== Single-Season Team Records ==
=== Batting ===
- Average: Francisco Matos, .416, 2001
- Hits: Trey Beamon, 115, 2000
- Home runs: Jay Gainer, 22, 1999
- Runs batted in: Lorenzo De La Cruz, 85, 1998
- Runs scored: Erskine Kelly, 80, 1998
- Stolen bases: Billy Hall, 41, 1998
- Doubles: Steve Walker, 31, 1999
- Triples: Brandon Naples, 8, 1997

=== Pitching ===
- Appearances: Luis Ramirez, 40, 2000
- Starts: Tie, several
- Wins: Ray Davis, 1998, and Rich Hunter, 1999, 10
- Losses: Chet Medlock, 12, 2002
- Saves: Juan Gonzalez, 17, 1998
- Innings pitched: John Dillinger, 138.0 IP, 2003
- Strikeouts: John Dillinger, 147, 2003
- Bases on balls: Joe Gannon, 60, 2002
- Complete games: John Dillinger, 10, 2003
- Earned run average: Joe Norris, 1.33, 1998
- Shutouts: John Dillinger, 2, 2002

== Career Team Records ==
=== Batting ===
- Hits: Brandon Naples, 382, 1997–2000
- Home runs: Jay Gainer, 29, 1999, 2001
- Runs batted in: Brandon Naples, 162, 1997–2000
- Runs scored: Brandon Naples, 224, 1997–2000
- Stolen bases: Brandon Naples, 86, 1997–2000
- Doubles: Tie, 56: Jared Sadlowski, 1997–2000, and Ryan Bordenick, 2001–2003
- Triples: Brandon Naples, 17, 1997–2000

=== Pitching ===
- Appearances: Luis Ramirez, 86, 2000–2002
- Starts: John Dillinger, 38, 1998, 2002–2003
- Wins: Rich Hunter, 1998–1999, and John Dillinger, 1998, 2002–2003 17
- Losses: Tie, 12: Rich Hunter, John Dillinger, Chet Medlock, 12
- Saves: Juan Gonzalez, 25, 1998–1999
- Innings pitched: John Dillinger, 263.3 IP, 1998, 2002–2003
- Strikeouts: John Dillinger, 245, 1998, 2002–2003
- Bases on balls: John Dillinger, 98, 1998, 2002–2003
- Complete games: John Dillinger, 13, 1998, 2002–2003
- Shutouts: John Dillinger, 3, 1998, 2002–2003

== Notable Major League alumni ==
The Ambassadors had 20 former Major League players over their seven seasons of play. While the Ambassadors featured players that would be signed by Major League clubs, no Ambassador player, former Major Leaguer or otherwise, reached the Majors after playing with the Ambassadors.

1997

- Starting pitcher Jeff Mutis was one of the first players to sign with the Ambassadors and was already a local baseball celebrity. Mutis was drafted in 1985 in the 34th round by the Cleveland Indians out of Allentown Central Catholic but chose to go to Lafayette College instead. In 1989, the Indians once again selected Mutis, this time in the first round. Mutis would spend parts of 1991, 1992, and 1993 with the Indians before pitching for the Florida Marlins after being selected off waivers. Mutis pitched in just two games for the Ambassadors before retiring.
- Starting pitcher Andy Carter started 13 games for the Ambassadors in their inaugural 1997 season, posting an 8–3 record with a 3.46 ERA in 13 starts. Carter appeared in 68 games for the Philadelphia Phillies across 1994 and 1995.

1998

- Third baseman Kim Batiste appeared in 60 games for the Ambassadors in 1998, hitting .307 with 10 homers. Batiste was a third round draft pick in 1987 of the Philadelphia Phillies and appeared in 251 Major League games with the Phillies and the San Francisco Giants.
- Shortstop Pablo Martinez appeared in ten games with the Ambassadors before being signed by the Milwaukee Brewers and being sent to Triple-A Louisville Redbirds. Martinez appeared in four games with the Atlanta Braves in 1996, primarily as a pinch runner.
- Right-handed pitcher Rich Hunter went 17–12 across 1998 and 1999 with the Ambassadors. Hunter won the Paul Owens Award as the Phillies' outstanding minor league pitcher in 1995 and went 3–7 with a 6.49 ERA in 14 Major League starts with the Phillies in 1996.
- Left-handed pitcher Tom Thobe started three games with the Ambassadors in 1998 with a 5.79 ERA. Thobe appeared in seven games between 1995 and 1996 with the Atlanta Braves posting a 4.82 ERA with a 0–1 record.

1999

- Outfielder Scott Bullett hit .361 with a .407 on-base percentage in 91 plate appearance before leaving the club to play for Campeche Piratas in Liga Mexicana de Béisbol. Bullet was a career .233 Major League hitter with the Pittsburgh Pirates and Chicago Cubs.
- First baseman Jay Gainer set the Ambassadors' single-season home run record in 1999 with 22 while hitting .360/.457/.734. Gainer hit three homers for the Colorado Rockies in 1993 in 45 plate appearances. Gainer returned to the Ambassadors in 2001.

2000

- Outfielder Trey Beamon set the Ambassadors' single-season batting average and on-base percentage records in 2000 by hitting .381 and reaching base at a .484 clip. Beamon was a .253 hitter in 172 Major League appearances across three seasons with the Pittsburgh Pirates, San Diego Padres, and Detroit Tigers from 1996 through 1998.
- Pitcher Brian Drahman would go 11–9 across 2000 and 2001 for the Ambassadors. Drahman appeared in 47 games as a reliever for the Chicago White Sox from 1991 through 1993 and Florida Marlins in 1994.

2001

- Infielder Francisco Matos hit .416 in 65 games with the Ambassadors in 2001. Matos hit .250 in 14 games with the Oakland Athletics in 1994.
- Right-handed reliever Luis Andujar pitched five innings for the Ambassadors in 2001. Andujar went 3–10 with a 5.98 ERA across four Major League seasons with the White Sox and Toronto Blue Jays.
- Right-handed reliever Ed Correa appeared in five games for the Ambassadors in 2001, posting a 1–2 record with a 6.39 ERA. Correa had a career Major League record of 16–19 with a 4.57 ERA across three seasons with the White Sox and Texas Rangers.
- Left-handed starter Brad Pennington started eight games for the Ambassadors in 2001, earning a 4–2 record with a 5.86 ERA. Pennington had a 3–6 Major League record with a 7.02 ERA across five Major League seasons with the Baltimore Orioles, Cincinnati Reds, Boston Red Sox, California Angels, and Tampa Bay Devil Rays.
- Right-handed reliever Matt Wagner served as the Ambassadors' closer in 2001, earning 10 saves with a 0.89 ERA. Wagner started 15 games in 1996 with the Seattle Mariners, going 3–5 with a 6.86 ERA.

2002

- Catcher Angelo Encarnacion played 13 games for the Ambassadors in 2002. Encarnacion was a career .253 Major League hitter with the Pittsburgh Pirates and Anaheim Angels from 1996 through 1998.
- Catcher Mike Figga played 10 games for the Ambassadors in 2002. Figga appeared in 46 Major League games, hitting .213 with the New York Yankees and Baltimore Orioles from 1996 through 1999.
- First baseman Stephen Larkin hit .250 in 89 games with the Ambassadors in 2002. Larkin played in one Major League game with the Cincinnati Reds in 1998, going one for three with a single.
- Outfielder Darryl Motley hit .161 in nine games with the Ambassadors in 2002. Motley was a .243 hitter in 1420 plate appearances across six Major League seasons with the Kansas City Royals and Atlanta Braves.

2003

- Right-handed starting pitcher Rafael Valdez pitched one game for the Ambassadors in 2003. Valdez pitched three games for the 1990 San Diego Padres.
