= Leo García (baseball) =

Dominican baseball player (born 1962)

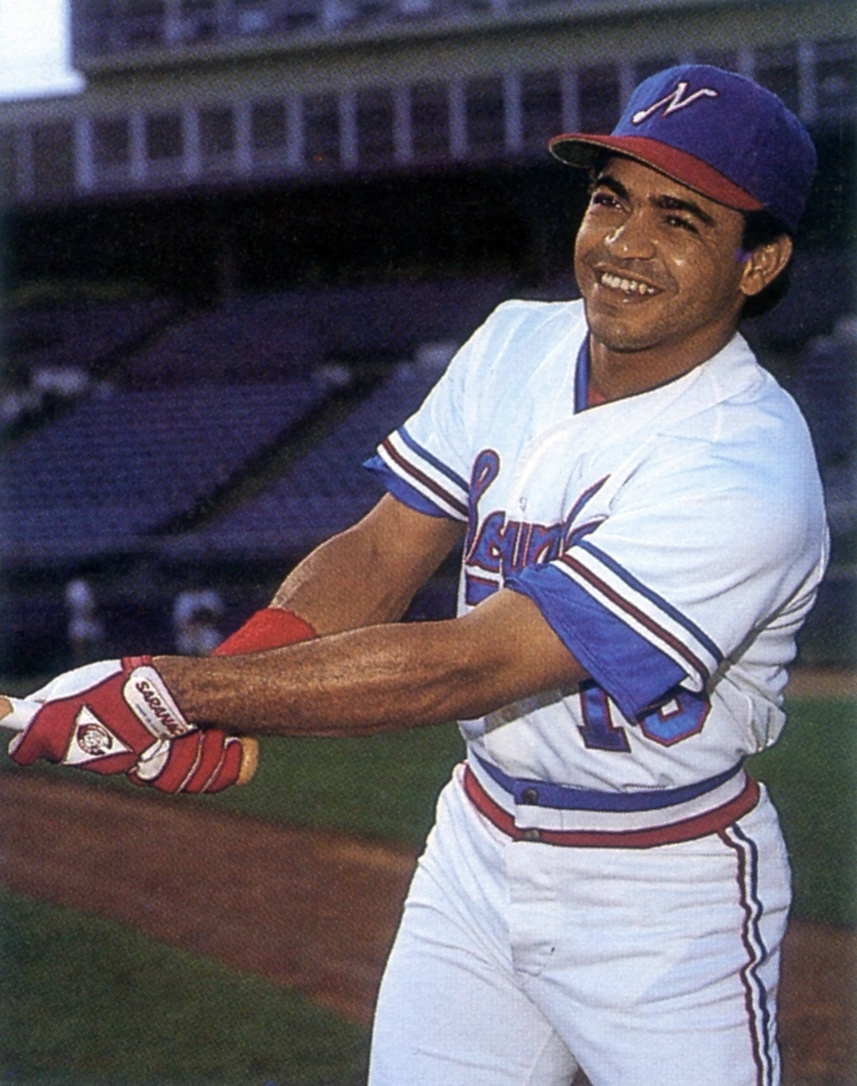
- García with the Nashville Sounds in 1987
- Outfielder
- Born: November 6, 1962 (age 63); Santiago, Dominican Republic
- Batted: Left Threw: Left

MLB debut
- April 6, 1987, for the Cincinnati Reds

Last MLB appearance
- June 1, 1988, for the Cincinnati Reds

MLB statistics
- Batting average: .172
- Home runs: 1
- Runs batted in: 2

CPBL statistics
- Batting average: .301
- Home runs: 51
- Runs batted in: 207
- Stats at Baseball Reference

Teams
- Cincinnati Reds (1987–1988); Mercuries Tigers (1992–1996)

Leo García (born November 6, 1962) is a Dominican-born former Major League Baseball player who played outfield for the Cincinnati Reds in 1987 and 1988.

== Career ==
Garcia was signed as an undrafted free agent by the Chicago White Sox on January 26, 1980. He made his professional debut with the Gulf Coast White Sox in 1980 and played with the Class-A Appleton Foxes of the Midwest League in 1981 and 1982.

On September 7, 1982 he was traded to the Cincinnati Reds (along with Wade Rowdon) as a player to be named later in the deal that had previously sent Jim Kern to the White Sox. He spent 1983 with the AA Waterbury Reds in the Eastern League, where he hit .257 in 131 games.

He was promoted to AAA in 1984 and assigned to the Wichita Aeros of the American Association. He hit .283 in 117 games. The Reds switched their AAA team to the Denver Zephyrs in 1985 and to the Nashville Sounds in 1987 and Garcia played with all of them.

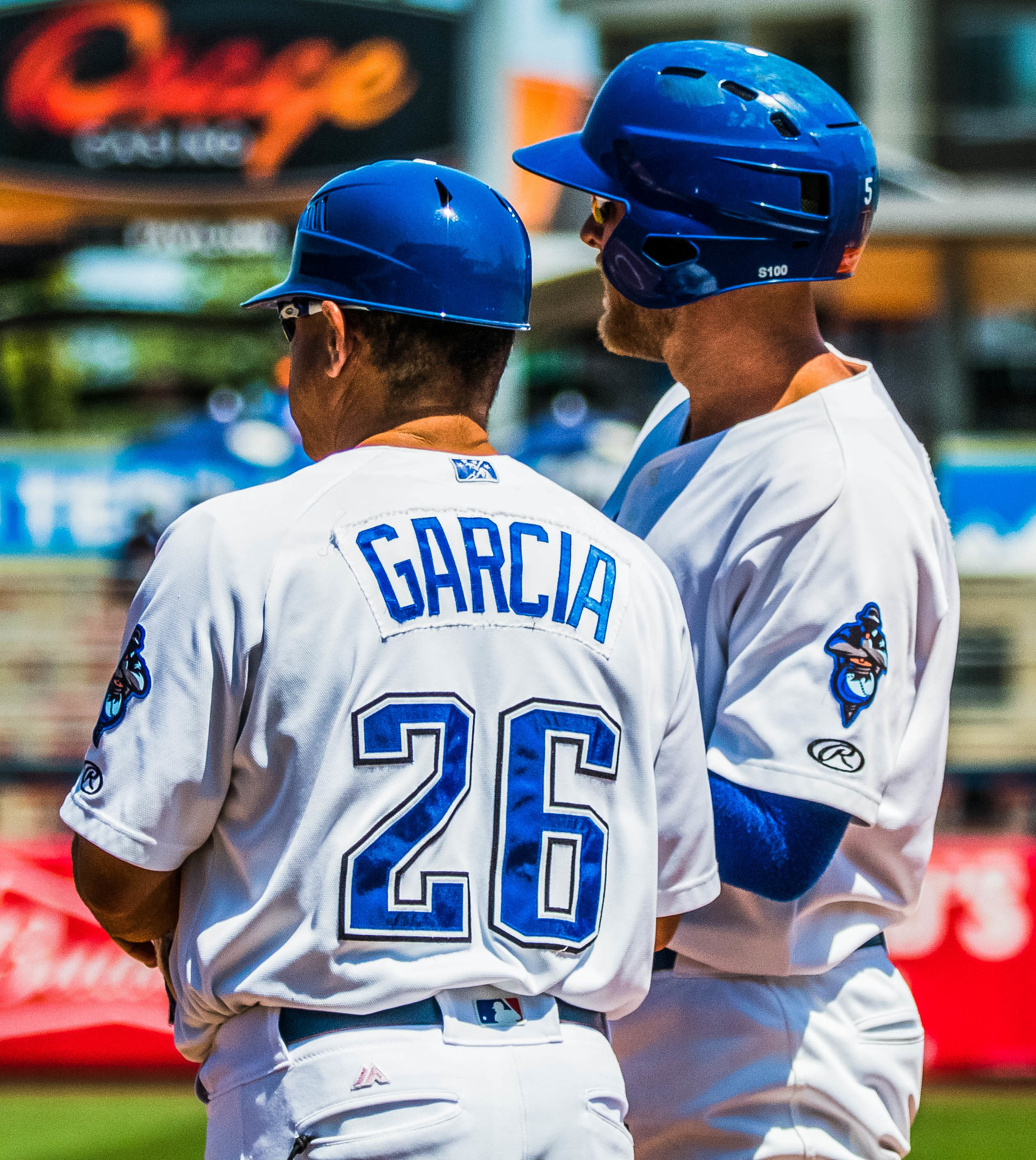
García (left) with the Tulsa Drillers in 2017

He made his Major League debut on April 6, 1987 and had a sacrifice fly as a pinch hitter. His first hit was a single to center field off of Ed Whitson of the San Diego Padres on April 12, also as a pinch hitter. He appeared in 31 games that season and another 23 the following year, most as either a pinch hitter or late inning defensive replacement. He hit .172 in 58 at bats. His only career home run was off Joe Boever of the Atlanta Braves on September 15, 1987.

Garcia signed a minor league contract with the Detroit Tigers in 1989 and hit .215 in 100 games for the AAA Toledo Mud Hens. He then returned to the Reds and Nashville for 1991 and 1992.

Leo Garcia played for the Omaha Royals in 1992 before being released and going to play in Taiwan.

After not playing at all in 1993 and 1994 he played in 25 games in 1995 for the Yonkers Hoot Owls of the independent Northeast League. He attempted another comeback in 1999 and played for the Somerset Patriots of the Atlantic League of Professional Baseball and the Oaxaca Guerreros of the Mexican League.

He became a minor league hitting coach in 2006 for the Arizona League Giants. From 2009-2012 he was with the Arizona League Dodgers and from 2013-2014 he was the hitting coach for the Rookie-Class Ogden Raptors. In 2015, he was promoted to the Double-A Tulsa Drillers as an assistant coach, a position he held through the 2018 season.
