= McCarthy Field =

Baseball stadium in Rhode Island, United States

Coordinates: 41.717213°N 71.515427°W

- Interactive map of McCarthy Field
- Location: West Warwick, Rhode Island
- Capacity: 2,500
- Surface: Natural grass
- Field size: Left field - 300 ft Center field - 366 ft Right field - 300 ft

Tenants
- Rhode Island Tiger Sharks (1996); Rhode Island Reds (1996-1999)/Riverpoint Royals (2001-2004)

McCarthy Field is a baseball stadium in West Warwick, Rhode Island. The field is located in Riverpoint Park, where the north and south branches of the Pawtuxet River merge.

The ballpark was constructed and mainly suited for high school, and amateur baseball. However in 1996 it would host minor league baseball for the first time. The newly formed Independent Northeast League (now known as the Can-Am League) was looking to expand and the Rhode Island Tiger Sharks were formed.

The park was not really suited for such a high level of baseball as the left and right field lines are only about 300 feet from home plate, and dead center field is only 366 feet. The team finished 19-61 and averaged about 200 fans per game. The team would not return for the 1997 season.

However, also in 1996 the New England Collegiate Baseball League was looking to expand and West Warwick was chosen to host a team. The stadium would now play host to the Rhode Island Reds. The Reds played 2 seasons at the stadium before moving to Cranston, Rhode Island and becoming the Rhode Island Gulls.

Once again, in 2001 the NECBL looked to expand, and West Warwick was picked to host a team. The new Riverpoint Royals would play at McCarthy field. The Royals would play for 4 seasons at the field, however they lacked sufficient attendance numbers and in 2005 the NECBL was set to have an un-balanced schedule with 13 teams in the league. The decision was made to eliminate the Royals from the league.

The stadium has moved back to its roots since the 2004 season, mainly playing host to high school and amateur games and hosting games for small college teams in the fall.
