= Francisco Matos =

Dominican baseball player (born 1970)

- Second baseman
- Born: April 8, 1970 (age 56); Santo Domingo, Dominican Republic
- Batted: Right Threw: Right

MLB debut
- July 17, 1994, for the Oakland Athletics

Last MLB appearance
- August 4, 1994, for the Oakland Athletics

MLB statistics
- Batting average: .250
- Home runs: 0
- Runs batted in: 2
- Stats at Baseball Reference

Teams
- Oakland Athletics (1994)

Francisco Aguirre Matos Mancebo (born April 8, 1970) is a Dominican former professional baseball player and current professional baseball coach. Signed as a free agent from his home region of Azua, Matos entered the world of Major League Baseball with appearances in 14 games for the Oakland Athletics during the 1994 season, primarily as a second baseman, though another area of tact to scouts included short-stop. Throughout his playing career, Matos earned his veteran status with his strong batting average and flexibility in playing positions, as he played second base, shortstop, and third base.

== Career ==
He was originally signed as a free agent by the Oakland Athletics in 1987 and made his professional debut in 1989 with the Modesto A's. Francisco Aguirre Matos Mancebo played actively for sixteen consecutive baseball seasons, seven of which were at the AAA level with MLB organizations. His last active season as a player was in 2004 for the Brockton Rox of the Northeast League, which he concluded with a .359 BA.

Following his career as an active player, Matos continued his career within the realm of Major League Baseball as a hitting coach with the Los Angeles Angels of Anaheim for 9 seasons- giving Matos opportunity to fine-tune utilizing his gift of relating to young athletes in his teachings and instruction. Coaching with the Angels involved incorporating work with farm teams in Rancho Cucamonga and Salt Lake City, among others, and working closely with young starters such as Mike Trout, Hank Cogner, and Mark Trumbo. He is currently coaching with the Texas Rangers major league baseball franchise.

Matos is married with four adult children: Lee, Mary Alexandra, Natalie, and Yefry.
