= Hebrew Congregation of Mountaindale Synagogue =

Orthodox synagogue in Mountaindale, New York

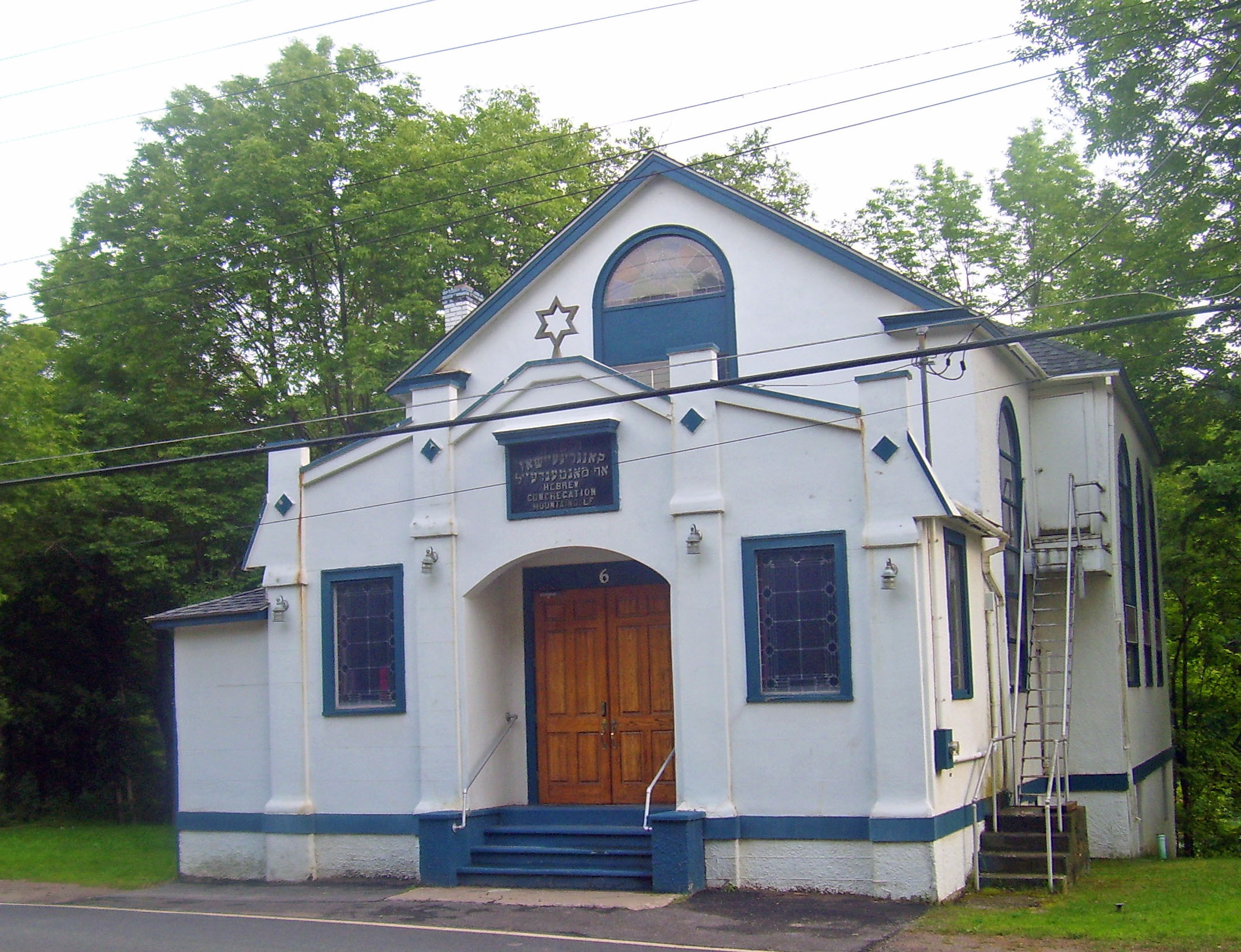
- North elevation and west profile of synagogue, 2008

- Location in New York

Religion
- Affiliation: Orthodox Judaism
- Ecclesiastical or organisational status: Synagogue
- Status: Active

Location
- Location: 6 Spring Glen Road, Mountaindale, Sullivan County, New York 12763
- Country: United States
- Coordinates: 41°41′20″N 74°31′51″W

Architecture
- Established: 1912 (as a congregation)
- Completed: 1917
- Construction cost: $5,000

Specifications
- Direction of façade: North
- Materials: Stucco, stone
- Hebrew Congregation of Mountaindale Synagogue
- U.S. National Register of Historic Places
- NRHP reference No.: 01000578
- Added to NRHP: May 30, 2001

The Hebrew Congregation of Mountaindale Synagogue is an Orthodox Jewish synagogue located at 6 Spring Glen Road, in the hamlet of Mountaindale, Sullivan County, in the Catskills region of New York, in the United States. The small stucco building was built in 1917 and expanded slightly in the 1930s. The interior is notable for its heavy use of marbleizing and other decorative touches. A 2009 traffic accident and fire caused some damage to the roof.

It is the only synagogue in the county with its own mikvah, or Jewish ritual bath. In 2001 it was listed on the National Register of Historic Places (NRHP) as a well-preserved example of an early 20th-century vernacular Catskill synagogue.

== Property ==
The NRHP listing includes both the synagogue and the mikvah. The former is a three-bay two-story stucco-faced frame structure on a fieldstone foundation. Its gabled roof has asphalt shingling and a wooden cornice. A rear pavilion, built into a hill, has a hipped roof and a projecting center bay that houses the Torah.

In the apex of the front gable is a round-arched window with a Star of David. This is complemented by a similar metal finial atop the roof of the single-story front vestibule, added later on a concrete base scored to look like the stone on the main building. It is above the front entrance, a broken-parapeted roofline supported by four piers.

Double wooden doors open into the vestibule, which gives onto the sanctuary. It is laid out in a traditional Orthodox plan, with many of its surfaces heavily marbleized. The bimah at the center, pews surrounding it on three sides facing the ark in the rear and a separate gallery for women. The windows are set in molded wooden trim with keystones. The vaulted ceiling is finished in pressed metal with a decorative frieze, and the stained glass windows feature Hebrew motifs.

The mikvah is located to the east of the building. It is a one-story square frame stucco building with a gabled roof. Inside it is divided into a changing room and the bath itself.

== History ==
Jews, most of them originally immigrants from Germany, began arriving in the Catskills and Mountaindale in the early years of the 20th century. They either began farming the area or opening summer resorts for their co-religionists, since Jews were then excluded from existing Catskill resorts.

Enough had arrived by 1912 to form the congregation that year. In 1915 a Hebrew school was built and construction began on the synagogue itself. It cost $5,000 ($159,000 in 2009 dollars) to build; a benefit was held after its 1917 completion to pay off the mortgage).

In 1930 the vestibule was added. The mikvah was built as a community project a decade later. Further renovations in the 1990s added beadboard siding inside, replaced the ark and put in new windows. At that time some of the original interior paintings were painted over as well, although they are preserved in photographs.

The synagogue and mikvah were listed on the National Register in 2001. Eight years later, a lost truck driver attempted to back up using the synagogue's small parking lot on the north side. The trailer downed some of the electrical wires along the road, some of which landed on the roof and started a fire, damaging it slightly. In 2019, it was announced that the congregation received a grant from the New York Landmarks Conservancy to repair the roof.
