= Mohawk Valley Landsharks =

- 1995; Little Falls, New York

Minor league affiliations
- Class: Independent (1995)
- League: Northeast League (1995)

Minor league titles
- League titles: None

Team data
- Name: Mohawk Valley Landsharks (1995)
- Colors: Teal, black, white
- Ballpark: Little Falls Veterans Memorial Park (1995)
- Owner/ Operator: Jeff Kunion
- General manager: Russ Ardolina
- Manager: Dan Shwam

The Mohawk Valley Landsharks were a minor league baseball team based in Little Falls, New York in the state's Mohawk Valley region. The team played its games in the Northeast League, an independent league not affiliated with Major League Baseball. The team existed for just one season, 1995, and played its home games at Little Falls Veterans Memorial Park.

== History ==
When the Northeast League was formed and played its first season in 1995 it was a 6-team league with all six teams being located in the State of New York. The Landsharks would be one of those six original teams. The Landsharks would have a very successful season in their first year, finishing 2nd in the league with a 47–23 record. They would make the Northeast League playoffs, but lose in the first round. Although the team played very well on the field, the club was plagued by poor attendance numbers. At the end of the season the team would fold and be replaced by the Rhode Island Tiger Sharks, who would suffer the same fate as the Landsharks, only lasting one season.
