= Frank Boulton =

Baseball league founder and owner

- Born: 1950 or 1951 (age 75–76); Long Island, New York, U.S.
- Education: Bay Shore High School; Villanova University
- Occupations: Finance executive Baseball executive
- Known for: Founder of the Atlantic League of Professional Baseball and Long Island Ducks

Frank Forest Boulton is a baseball league founder and the owner of several teams, including the Long Island Ducks. He started the Atlantic League of Professional Baseball in 1998 and was its chief executive officer (CEO).

Boulton graduated from Bay Shore High School in 1969, attended Villanova University and began working in finance. He later bought an interest in the Prince William Cannons, Albany-Colonie Yankees and Wilmington Blue Rocks. He formed the Atlantic League after receiving a call in 1994 from the mayor of Atlantic City, New Jersey seeking his help attracting a professional baseball team to the city.
