= Northeast League Aces =

The Aces
- Logo

Information
- League: Northeast League
- Founded: 2004
- Folded: 2004
- Colors: Black, White, Yellow, Red

The Northeast League Aces (also simply referred to as The Aces) were a baseball traveling team in the Northeast League in the 2004 season to replace the Allentown Ambassadors.

The Ambassadors' roster was dispersed around the league, and the Aces were forced to sign free agents to form a team to compete. They finished the first half of the season in last place in the Northeast League South Division, but rebounded in the second half to finish second, albeit a distant second, behind the eventual league champion New Jersey Jackals.

For the inaugural Can-Am League season in 2005, the Aces were disbanded and replaced by a permanent team in Worcester, Massachusetts.

The Aces used the logo of the then-defunct Alexandria Aces for their lone year of existence. (The logo was later used by the new incarnation of the Alexandria Aces, who were reformed in 2006 and played until 2013 in the Texas Collegiate League.)
