= Rhode Island Tiger Sharks =

Minor-league baseball team

Information
- Location: West Warwick, Rhode Island
- Ballpark: McCarthy Field
- Founded: 1996
- Disbanded: 1996
- League championships: None
- Former league: Northeast League (1996)
- Colors: Black, orange, white, dark gray, light gray
- Ownership: Mike Palermo
- General manager: Mike Palermo
- Manager: Mike Palermo

The Rhode Island Tiger Sharks were a former Northeast League minor-league baseball team, located in West Warwick, Rhode Island. The Northeast League was an independent league and as such none of the teams in it were affiliated with Major League Baseball teams. The team played its home games at McCarthy Field and existed just one season, 1996.

The Northeast League hosted its first season in 1995 and played as a six-team league, with all teams being based in the state of New York. The league immediately looked to expand and also three of the original six teams did not make it to a second year. The Northeast League wanted to expand into the New England Region and had to search fast. West Warwick would be one of the New England cities granted a franchise, taking over for the Mohawk Valley Landsharks. Bangor, Maine was granted the other.

The home field for the Tiger Sharks was McCarthy Field. The stadium proved not to be very conducive to minor-league baseball play. The left and right field lines were only about 300 feet (91 m) from home plate and dead center field was only about 370 feet (110 m) away. Although many home runs were hit that season, very few were by the Tiger Sharks. The team finished dead-last in the six-team league, with a record of 19–61, a full 36 games behind the first place Albany-Colonie Diamond Dogs and 11 games behind second to last place Adirondack. The team finished dead last in the league in runs per game with just 4.03 runs per game, and also sported a league-worst ERA of 6.37. They only hit 37 home runs while giving up 92. The only recognizable player for the Tiger Sharks was former New York Yankees utility outfielder Mike Humphreys.

It did not take long to figure out that minor-league baseball was not suited for the city and the park. Only about 200 fans attended per game and after the 1996 season the decision was made to shut down the team. The Tiger Sharks became the Allentown Ambassadors.
