= Atlantic City Surf =

Minor-league baseball team in Atlantic City, New Jersey (1998–2009)

- 1998–2009; Atlantic City, New Jersey
Team logo
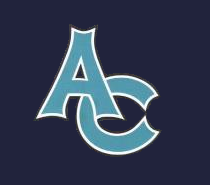
Cap insignia

Minor league affiliations
- Class: Independent (1998–2009)
- League: Can-Am Association (2007–08); Atlantic League (1998–2006)

Minor league titles
- League titles (1): 1998

Team data
- Name: Atlantic City Surf (1998–2008)
- Colors: Navy, aqua, purple, white
- Ballpark: Surf Stadium

The Atlantic City Surf were a professional minor league baseball team based in Atlantic City, New Jersey. The Surf was most recently a member of the Can-Am League, which is not affiliated with Major League Baseball. The Surf played its home games at Surf Stadium, which was formerly known as "The Sandcastle" and "Bernie Robbins Stadium"

From 1998 to 2006, the Surf played in the South Division of the Atlantic League of Professional Baseball. While in the Atlantic League, the Surf won the first-ever Atlantic League championship in 1998 while also hosting the inaugural Atlantic League All-Star game.

On March 30, 2009, the Atlantic City Surf organization ceased operations, leaving the Can-Am League with six teams. Players from the team were made available in an April 3, 2009 dispersal draft.

On May 17, 2018, Atlantic City's City Council authorized Frank Boulton, the former owner of the Atlantic City Surf (Independent Professional, Can-Am League/Atlantic League) to find an ownership group willing to bring minor league baseball back to Surf Stadium. The team was to compete in the 2019 season — however success quickly became "unlikely" and there currently are no indications that professional baseball will return to Atlantic City.

== Earlier Atlantic City baseball teams ==
Atlantic City historically has never enjoyed much success as a venue for professional sports teams and baseball has been no exception. The city hosted a few short-lived, unnamed teams in various leagues in the 19th century, then provided a home for the defunct Lancaster Red Roses of the Tri-State League in 1912. The franchise played one more season in Atlantic City in 1913 before disbanding.

=== Bacharach Giants ===
In 1916, the Bacharach Giants moved to Atlantic City. Originally known as the Duval Giants of Jacksonville, Florida, its name was changed to the Bacharach Giants in honor of the city's mayor, Harry Bacharach. The team was independent from 1916 to 1922, then became a member of the Eastern Colored League from 1923 until the league's folding during the 1928 season, winning the league in 1926 and 1927 under the leadership of Dick Lundy. Other notable players for the Giants included Oliver Marcelle, Smokey Joe Williams, "Pop" Lloyd, and Arthur "Rats" Henderson. The team became affiliated with the American Negro League in 1929, and continued in the Negro National League in 1932, when it folded as a professional team.

== Atlantic City Surf ==
In 1998, the independent Atlantic League of Professional Baseball placed a team in Atlantic City called the Surf. Opening their new ballpark called The Sandcastle on May 20, the Surf was defeated by the Somerset Patriots by a score of 8-5. Playing host to the first Atlantic League All-Star game on July 15, the Surf defeated the League All-Stars 6-4 and would later win the league's first Championship Series over the Bridgeport Bluefish, three games to one. The Surf made it to the post-season four times in five years (2002 and 2004–06) but were eliminated in the first round each time.

In 2007, the Surf moved from the Atlantic League to the Can-Am League. In 2007 the Surf made the playoffs in their inaugural season in the Can-Am. The team managed by Chris Carminucci finished with the 2nd best overall record of 51-41. In the playoffs lost to the North Shore Spirit 3 games to 1 in the opening round. The Surf received many awards in 2007. Carminucci received manager of the year. Starting pitcher Brian Rodaway received Pitcher of the Year Award after finishing a league-best 15-3. Relief pitcher Matt Pike received the Reliever of the Year award for his league leading 24 saves. In 2008 the Surf hired Cecil Fielder as the team manager. The Surf continued their success finishing 51-43 (4th overall record) and once again in the playoffs, this time losing to the Quebec Capitales 3 games to 1 in the opening round.

On March 30, 2009, the Can-Am League announced the Surf would not be operating in the 2009 season due to the collapse of the proposed sale of the team and lack of ownership to continue for the 2009 season. The Surf joined fellow league member Ottawa Voyageurs in ceasing operations for the 2009 season.

== Season-by-season records ==
Atlantic City Surf - 1998 to 2008
Season	W - L Record	Winning Percentage	Finish	Playoffs
1998	60-40	.600	2nd Overall	3-1 (won league championship)
1999	61-58	.513	3rd Overall	Did not qualify for playoffs
2000	61-78	.442	2nd in South Division	Did not qualify for playoffs
2001	64-62	.507	2nd in South Division	Did not qualify for playoffs
2002	71-53	.573	2nd in South Division	1-2 (lost in division final)
2003	63-63	.500	3rd in South Division	Did not qualify for playoffs
2004	71-54	.568	1st (Tie) in South Division	0-2 (lost in division final)
2005	79-61	.564	2nd in South Division	1-2 (lost in division final)
2006	69-57	.548	2nd in South Division	0-2 (lost division final)
2007	51-41	.554	2nd in Canadian- American Association	1-3 (lost in semi-final)
2008	51-43	.543	4th in Canadian- American Association	1-3 (lost in semi-final)
Totals (1998–2008)	701-620	.531	-	7-15

== Postseason ==
Atlantic League Post-Season Results:

- 1998: Defeated Bridgeport Bluefish, 3 games to 1, for League Championship
- 2002: Lost to Newark Bears, 2 games to 1, in opening round
- 2004: Lost to Camden Riversharks, 2 games to 0, in opening round
- 2005: Lost to Somerset Patriots, 2 games to 1, in opening round
- 2006: Lost to Lancaster Barnstormers, 2 games to 0, in opening round

Can-Am League Post-Season Results:

- 2007: Lost to North Shore Spirit, 3 games to 1, in opening round
- 2008: Lost to Quebec Capitales, 3 games to 1, in opening round

== Team information ==
Uniform colors: White with navy pinstripes for home games and navy for away games. The home jersey has an interlocking "AC" centered on the left and number on the back. The away jersey has the wordmark "Surf" in teal with white and purple outline. Navy blue hats with the interlocking letters "AC" in white with teal outline.

Mascot: "Splash".

Radio broadcasts: Play-by-Play announcer: Matt Martucci, broadcast by WLFR.

TV Broadcast of Atlantic City Surf Game June 1999

Achievements
Preceded by New League	Atlantic League Champions; Atlantic City Surf; 1998	Succeeded by Bridgeport Bluefish; 1999
