= Northern League (baseball, 1993–2010) =

North American baseball league

- Most recent season or competition: 2010 Northern League season
- Sport: Baseball
- Founded: 1993
- Folded: 2010
- Countries: United States; Canada
- Continent: North America
- Last champion: Fargo-Moorhead RedHawks
- Most titles: Fargo-Moorhead RedHawks (5)

The Northern League was an independent minor professional baseball league. It was not affiliated with Major League Baseball or the organized minor leagues. The league was founded in 1993 and folded after its 2010 season when financial stability became a problem. The three teams remaining in the league when it folded joined with the remaining teams in United League Baseball and the Golden Baseball League to form a new independent organization called the North American League.

== History ==
The modern Northern League was founded by Miles Wolff. Wolff started the league after many midwestern cities contacted him (through his affiliation with Baseball America) asking how they could get a minor league team. After visiting some of them, most notably Duluth, Minnesota, and its Wade Stadium, he began contacting potential owners to start the league. The league was structured to where teams were not allowed to load their rosters with ex-pros. Players with five or more years of professional experience were labeled "veterans" and teams could carry no more than four. At least the same number of "rookies" (players with less than a year of experience) had to be on a team's roster. The rest of the roster was made up of "limited service" or "LS" players, each having a number from 1 through 5 attached to the LS depending on how long they had been in pro baseball.

The league began in 1993 with six teams: Duluth–Superior Dukes (Duluth, Minnesota), Rochester Aces (Rochester, Minnesota), St. Paul Saints (St. Paul, Minnesota), Sioux Falls Canaries (Sioux Falls, South Dakota), Sioux City Explorers (Sioux City, Iowa) and Thunder Bay Whiskey Jacks (Thunder Bay, Ontario). The prospects for the league were originally "cloudy." Many forecast an early demise especially in St. Paul where competition with the Minnesota Twins led many local sportswriters to consider it a "beer league." The league, however, was a relatively moderate success, with only the Rochester franchise struggling to draw crowds to their games. The first league title was won by St. Paul. After the season, the Aces were sold to an ownership group led by future Winnipeg, Manitoba mayor Sam Katz and the team relocated to the city and became known as the Winnipeg Goldeyes, taking the name of the Winnipeg team that played in the original Northern League. The Goldeyes won the league championship in their first season in the new city.

The first wave of expansion to the league came in 1996 as the Northern League entered Wisconsin and North Dakota. The Madison Black Wolf, based in the capital of Wisconsin, and Fargo-Moorhead RedHawks, based in Fargo, North Dakota, but named for the metropolitan area that includes Moorhead, Minnesota, joined the league. The second wave of expansion came in 1999. First, the Whiskey Jacks left Canada and moved to Schaumburg, Illinois, where they became known as the Schaumburg Flyers. The bigger news, however, was that the Northeast League, an independent league in the Northeastern and Mid-Atlantic states also founded by Wolff, would merge with the Northern League and become the Northern League's East Division. The rest of the Northern League teams comprised the Central Division, and both division champions would meet in a league championship series. The merger lasted until 2002, and Northeast League teams won all four of the Northern League's championships in that time. Meanwhile, Madison's team moved to Lincoln, Nebraska, in 2001 to become the Lincoln Saltdogs while teams were awarded to Joliet, Illinois, and Gary, Indiana, in 2002. The Joliet JackHammers made the playoffs in their first season while the Gary SouthShore RailCats were forced to play an entire season on the road because the city of Gary did not have their stadium completed on time.

At the end of the 2002 season Miles Wolff resigned as commissioner of the Northern League to focus on his duties with the now-reinstated Northeast League. Mike Stone became league commissioner in 2003. Over the next two years the league entered three new markets. Charter member Duluth-Superior left Minnesota in 2003 to move to Kansas City, Kansas, and became known as the Kansas City T-Bones. For 2004, the league expanded its Canadian operations into the province of Alberta and added the Calgary Vipers and Edmonton CrackerCats to the league.

Mike Stone left the commissioner's position in 2005 shortly after a dramatic move by several of the league's teams. Following the season's conclusion St. Paul, Sioux City, Sioux Falls, and Lincoln announced they were leaving the league to form a new independent league with five teams from the folded Central Baseball League in the southern United States; the new league was to be known as the American Association of Independent Professional Baseball. Stone was replaced by Jim Weigel, who in turn was replaced by Clark C. Griffith after one year in charge. Following the 2007 season, the league was left with six teams as Calgary and Edmonton left to join the Golden Baseball League. This number grew to seven in 2009 as Zion, Illinois, was granted an expansion team known as the Lake County Fielders. In 2010 an eighth team was added when the Rockford RiverHawks moved from the Frontier League.

Following the 2010 season, the Northern League announced that Winnipeg, Kansas City, Fargo-Moorhead, and Gary SouthShore would be leaving the league to join the American Association. This left Rockford, Lake County, Joliet, and Schaumburg with decisions to make. The JackHammers were sold and renamed to the Joliet Slammers, and moved to the Frontier League. The other three franchises merged with the Golden Baseball League and United League Baseball franchises to form the North American League. However, things did not work out as planned. The Flyers were evicted from Alexian Field, their home stadium, due to a large amount of debt owed to their home town of Schaumburg and eventually suspended operations. The RiverHawks decided to decline the invitation in the league and return to the Frontier League for 2011. The Fielders were the only team remaining from the original three merged into the new league but have since folded, meaning there are no longer any Northern League teams remaining in the North American League. As of the end of the 2011 season only one member of the North American League has, in fact, played in the Northern League – the Edmonton Capitals (the former Cracker-Cats). The fate of the North American League was also soon decided with the Golden Baseball League's teams disbanding and the United Baseball League decided to re-adopt their league name due to only UBL teams remaining in the ill-fated NAL after the 2012 season. The UBL itself folded after the 2014 season.

Over 12 seasons, over two dozen former Northern League players have played in Major League Baseball. These include players such as J. D. Drew, Kevin Millar, Chris Coste, Jeff Zimmerman, and Rey Ordóñez. Several former MLB players played in the league including Dennis "Oil Can" Boyd, Darryl Strawberry, Jack Morris, Pedro Guerrero, Jermaine Allensworth, Ken Harvey, Mike Caruso, Bo Hart, Leon "Bull" Durham, and Brant Brown. Former MLB players and coaches have also coached or managed in the Northern League including Terry Bevington, "Dirty" Al Gallagher, Jackie Hernández, Danny Jackson, Maury Wills, Tim Johnson, Ron Kittle, Hal Lanier, Darryl Motley, Matt Nokes, and Wayne Terwilliger.

== League structure ==
When the Northern League consisted of between eight and twelve teams, it played a split season 96-game schedule with two divisions from late May until early September. The division winners in each half qualified for the post-season, though if a team were to win both halves, the team with the best overall record, regardless of division, qualified as a wild card. Both the league semi-finals and Championship Series were best of five.

When the league dropped to six teams in 2008, it still played a 96-game schedule, but did not split the season and did not have divisions. Instead, the top four teams qualified for the playoffs. The first round consisted of a best-of-five series between the first and fourth-place finishers and between second and third-place finishers. The winners of the first round then played a best-of-five championship series.

In October 2009 the Northern League voted to expand from its 96-game season to a 100-game schedule, effective for the 2010 season. The playoff format was to remain the same, with the top four clubs making the playoffs.

=== Rosters ===
During the season, rosters were limited to 22 players, broken into seven classes based on a players years of service. One year of service was defined as one National Association (affiliated) season, or two independent league seasons.

- Rookie: A player with less than one year service. Each team must carry a minimum of five Rookies.
- LS-1: "Limited Service", a player with less than two years.
- LS-2: A player with less than three years.
- LS-3: A player with less than four years.
- LS-4: A player with less than five years. Only four players may be LS-4's.
- LS-5: A player with less than six years.
- Veteran: A player with six or more years. A maximum of four players may be veterans.

== Former teams (1993–2010) ==
- Rochester Aces (1994 became Winnipeg Goldeyes)
- Thunder Bay Whiskey Jacks (1999 became Schaumburg Flyers)
- Madison Black Wolf (2001 became Lincoln Saltdogs)
- Duluth–Superior Dukes (2003 became Kansas City T-Bones)
- St. Paul Saints (2005 left to create American Association)
- Lincoln Saltdogs (2005 left to create American Association)
- Schaumburg Flyers (folded in 2011 before joining North American League)
- Sioux Falls Canaries (2005 left to create American Association)
- Sioux City Explorers (2005 left to create American Association)
- Calgary Vipers (2007 left to join Golden Baseball League, have since folded)
- Edmonton Cracker-Cats (2007 left to join Golden Baseball League, has since changed name to Edmonton Capitals)
- Fargo-Moorhead RedHawks (2010 left to join American Association)
- Gary SouthShore RailCats (2010 left to join American Association)
- Kansas City T-Bones (2010 left to join American Association)
- Winnipeg Goldeyes (2010 left to join American Association)

=== League timeline ===
Final league members Former Team

== Former Northern League East teams (1999–2002) ==
(Left to re-form Northeast League, then later the Can-Am League)

- Adirondack Lumberjacks (1995–2003); team later moved to Bangor, Maine and then folded
- Albany-Colonie Diamond Dogs (1995–2002); team later folded
- Allentown Ambassadors (1997–2003); team later folded
- Berkshire Black Bears (2002–2003); team later moved to New Haven, Connecticut and then folded
- Brockton Rox (2002–2011); team later played in Futures Collegiate Baseball League
- Catskill Cougars (2000)
- Elmira Pioneers (1996–2005); team now plays in New York Collegiate Baseball League
- Massachusetts Mad Dogs (1997–1999); team became inactive for three years before reforming as the Berkshire Black Bears
- New Jersey Jackals (1998–)
- Québec Capitales (1999–)
- Waterbury Spirit (1997–2000); team revived as North Shore Spirit in 2003 in Lynn, Massachusetts, later folded

== Champions ==
- 1993 St. Paul Saints
- 1994 Winnipeg Goldeyes
- 1995 St. Paul Saints
- 1996 St. Paul Saints
- 1997 Duluth–Superior Dukes
- 1998 Fargo-Moorhead RedHawks
- 1999 Albany-Colonie Diamond Dogs
- 2000 Adirondack Lumberjacks
- 2001 New Jersey Jackals
- 2002 New Jersey Jackals
- 2003 Fargo-Moorhead RedHawks
- 2004 St. Paul Saints
- 2005 Gary SouthShore RailCats
- 2006 Fargo-Moorhead RedHawks
- 2007 Gary SouthShore RailCats
- 2008 Kansas City T-Bones
- 2009 Fargo-Moorhead RedHawks
- 2010 Fargo-Moorhead RedHawks

== All-Star Game ==
The Northern League hosted an annual All-Star Game starting in 1997. The venue changed annually. Its format pitted the all-stars from each division against each other. In 2008 and 2009, there were no divisions during the regular season so the league temporarily split to have the "Chicagoland" clubs play the "I-29" clubs in 2008 and the "Great Lakes" clubs play the "Great Plains" clubs in 2009. In 2010, the Northern League played the Golden League all-stars.

=== Game results ===
- 1997 – East 2, West 1
- 1998 – West 10, East 7
- 1999 – Central 7, East 5
- 2000 – East 10, Central 5
- 2001 – East 7, Central 4
- 2002 – Central 12, East 3
- 2003 – East 4, West 2
- 2004 – South 8, North 5
- 2005 – North 5, South 1
- 2006 – East 7, West 6
- 2007 – South 7, North 5
- 2008 – Chicagoland 6, I-29 5
- 2009 – Great Lakes 5, Great Plains 5
- 2010 – Northern League 9, Golden League 3

=== Most Valuable Players ===
- 1997 – Nate Vopata, (Madison Black Wolf)
- 1998 – Marc Gutfeld, (Sioux Falls Canaries)
- 1999 – Bryan Warner, (Duluth–Superior Dukes)
- 2000 – Jon Mueller, (Albany-Colonie Diamond Dogs)
- 2001 – Ryan Kane, (New Jersey Jackals)
- 2002 – Brent Sachs, (Winnipeg Goldeyes)
- 2003 – Cory Harris, (St. Paul Saints)
- 2004 – Chris Weekly, (Schaumburg Flyers)
- 2005 – Richard Austin, (Fargo-Moorhead RedHawks)
- 2006 – Stubby Clapp, (Edmonton Cracker-Cats)
- 2007 – Christian Snavely, (Schaumburg Flyers)
- 2008 – Jay Pecci, (Gary SouthShore RailCats)
- 2009 – Freddie Thon, (Joliet JackHammers)
- 2010 – Jason James, (Rockford RiverHawks)
