= Little Falls Veterans Memorial Park =

Baseball stadium in Little Falls, New York, US

Coordinates: 43.041743°N 74.841335°W

Little Falls Veterans Memorial Park is a multi-purpose stadium in Little Falls, New York. It is home to the Mohawk Valley DiamondDawgs of the Perfect Game Collegiate Baseball League, and The Little Falls Middle School/ High School Field Hockey team. It previously was also the home of Little Falls Mets and the Little Falls Middle/High School Football team. The ballpark has a capacity of 2,000 people and opened in 1949.
