= Yonkers Hoot Owls =

New York-based minor league baseball team

Information
- Location: Yonkers, New York
- Ballpark: Fleming Field
- Founded: 1995
- Disbanded: 1995
- League championships: None
- Former league: Northeast League (1995)
- Colors: Black, red, white
- Ownership: Adele Leone
- General manager: Randye Ringler
- Manager: Paul Blair
- Media: WFAS

The Yonkers Hoot Owls were a minor league baseball team based in Yonkers, New York, playing in the independent Northeast League (later known as the Can-Am League). The team existed just one season in 1995 and played its home games at Fleming Field in Yonkers.

== History ==
Hoot Owls game program

When the NEL was formed with six teams (all in New York State), it desired to have a presence in or near New York City; however, a proposed team in Mount Vernon, New York never got off the ground. The league then turned to Adele Leone, a literary agent and Richard Monaco, a writer. Although it was the fourth-most populous city in New York, Yonkers had not hosted pro ball since having a Class C team in the Hudson River League in 1907. Leone and the Northeast League would immediately start their short relationship off on the wrong foot: she wanted to call the team the Blue Bandits, but the league, who had already come up with the Hoot Owls name and logo for the abortive Mount Vernon team, forced her to name them the Yonkers Hoot Owls.

Unable to find a professional-quality stadium in Yonkers, Leone made plans for the Hoot Owls to play their home games at Fleming Field. The field, which has been called "the worst stadium ever in the history of professional baseball", was essentially a city park. It had concrete slab seating, no locker rooms, no permanent concessions, no permanent restrooms, no dugouts and no permanent lighting (Leone would spend her own money to install lights for the field). The field also had no infield grass, making the Owls one of the very few American professional baseball teams in history to play their home games on an all-dirt infield. (Dirt infields are common in other parts of the world, such as Asia.) Also, since there was very little parking around the field, Leone paid for off-site parking with shuttle bus service to and from the field.

The seating would cause financial problems for the team from the very beginning: Fleming Field could only comfortably seat about five hundred people, with potential overflow seating of maybe another three to five hundred. Even if the team sold out every game, they would still be close to last in the league in attendance. As it would turn out, overflow crowds in Yonkers were never a problem, especially since general admission tickets were a pricey six dollars, highest-priced in the NEL.

Throughout the season, the Hoot Owls received little to no fan support, drawing only about 5,000 fans for the entire season, or less than 200 per game. Also, Leone was unable to gain support from local businesses; the outfield walls were nearly empty of advertisements, as were the game programs.

The broadcast facilities were nonexistent. WFAS radio broadcast from a card table at the top of the bleachers with Ryan Patrick and Mike Hayes calling the action. If it rained they had to throw a tarp over their equipment. The phone line they broadcast on was attached to a nearby tree and "when lightning struck you could hear the crackle in the headsets. I thought I was going to get electrocuted." reported Hayes.

== 1995 season ==
Former MLB all-star Paul Blair was named the manager of the club. Most of the players, however, were local residents in their late teens and early twenties; only a handful had any professional experience. Former Cincinnati Reds outfielder Leo Garcia was alleged to have played for the Owls, seven years removed from his last major league contest. However, a 2021 article about the team states that this was actually a different Leo García, an amateur from Tarrytown, New York. Either way, he batted just .158 in 25 games for Yonkers.

One of the Owls' few good players was Pete Bifone, who had played the year before in the San Diego Padres system; he not only joined the club as a player but also attempted (mostly in vain) to sell ads for the ballpark and programs.

In the end, Yonkers would finish the 1995 season with a disastrous 14–54 (.206) record, last in the six-team league, 37 games out of first place. It was the worst record of any pro baseball club (major, minor or independent) in 1995, and one of the worst by any team in modern times. Leone had no choice but to fold the club after the 1995 season; Yonkers' spot in the NEL was taken by a team from Bangor, Maine, in 1996.

In March 2021, an article on MLB.com declared the Yonkers Hoot Owls the "worst team in the history of paid play" of baseball even as players recalled their time fondly, with Pete Bifone recalling, "We sucked. But it was the funnest year of my life."
