= Worcester Tornadoes =

Baseball team based from Worcester, MA

Logo
Cap insignia

Information
- League: Can-Am League
- Location: Worcester, Massachusetts, U.S.
- Ballpark: Hanover Insurance Park at Fitton Field
- Founded: 2005
- Disbanded: 2012
- League championships: 2005
- Colors: Rust, black, tan, white, gray
- Mascot: Twister
- Media: Worcester Telegram & Gazette, WTAG/580 (also on W235AV/94.9), WCTR Charter TV3
- Website: www.worcestertornadoes.com

The Worcester Tornadoes were a professional baseball team based in Worcester, Massachusetts, in the United States. The Tornadoes were a member of the Canadian-American Association of Professional Baseball, an independent baseball league which was not affiliated with Major League Baseball. The Tornadoes played their home games at Hanover Insurance Park at Fitton Field, on the College of the Holy Cross campus.

== History ==
The Worcester Tornadoes were named after the destructive tornado that hit Worcester on June 9, 1953. At a home game on or around the anniversary of the tornado, the team remembered the victims with a moment of silence before the singing of the national anthem.

The Tornadoes, in their first season, won the championship of the Canadian-American Association of Professional Baseball (Can-Am League), sweeping the Quebec Capitales three games to zero. After beating Quebec in the first two games at Stade Municipal, the Tornadoes clinched the championship on their home field on September 15, 2005.

On October 5, 2009, the majority stake of the franchise was sold by Perfect Game LLC to an undisclosed group of Maryland-based investors, which was later revealed to be Todd Breighner of Streamlined Sports, Inc. The directors of the ownership group included Charles Milanz and John Grammer. Jorg Bassiacos was executive vice president and general manager. The Tornadoes were managed by Rich Gedman, a former major-league catcher with the Boston Red Sox, until the end of the 2010 season.

On August 31, 2012, the Can-Am League announced that it was terminating the franchise's charter due to a slumping financial state which included failure to pay for uniform cleaning. League commissioner Miles Wolff declared he would try to find a new ownership group, but was unable to do so and the remaining Tornadoes players were either taken in a dispersal draft in October 2012 or given their outright releases.

Baseball returned to Worcester in 2014 with the advent of the summer collegiate league Worcester Bravehearts, who took the Tornadoes’ place at Fitton Field. Subsequently, the Boston Red Sox relocated their Triple-A farm team from Pawtucket, Rhode Island, to Worcester, establishing the Worcester Red Sox.

== Logos and uniforms ==
The official colors of the Worcester Tornadoes were black, burnt orange, and beige. The primary logo consisted of a stylized, white baseball with burnt orange threads centered inside of a black ring outlined in burnt orange and black. The words "Worcester Tornadoes" were arched inside of the ring in beige in scripted, capital letters. An orange and black tornado wrapped around a baseball bat in the middle of the logo, with a white "W" superimposed over the center, with black outline.

The Tornadoes uniforms incorporated traditional baseball design. The primary cap was black with a burnt orange brim, with the cap logo depicting a white "W" and a burnt orange tornado centered on the front. The home uniform was white with black pinstripes and burnt orange piping. The jersey featured the "Tornadoes" wordmark centered across the front in black with a burnt orange outline. The player's number was centered below and to the left of the wordmark in orange with black outline. The away jersey was gray with orange piping, with the "Worcester" wordmark arched across the front of the jersey in black with burnt orange outline.

== Playoffs ==
| Season | First round | League championship |
|---|---|---|
| 2005 | W, 2–1, New Haven County | W, 3–0, Quebec |
| 2006 | Did not qualify | |
| 2007 | Did not qualify | |
| 2008 | L, 1–3, Sussex | |
| 2009 | W, 3–0, New Jersey | L, 1–3, Quebec |
| 2010 | Did not qualify | |
| 2011 | Did not qualify | |
| 2012 | Did not qualify | |

Overall playoff record: 10–7 (.588)

During the 2007 season, the Tornadoes competed for the Commonwealth Cup with the Can-Am League's two other Massachusetts-based teams, the North Shore Spirit and the Brockton Rox. The Tornadoes finished in second (by three and a half games) behind the North Shore Spirit.

Achievements
| Preceded by New Jersey Jackals; 2004 Northeast | Can-Am League Champions; Worcester Tornadoes; 2005 | Succeeded by Québec Capitales; 2006 |
