= Albany–Colonie Diamond Dogs =

Defunct minor league baseball team

- 1995–2002; Colonie, New York

Minor league affiliations
- Class: Independent (1995–2002)
- League: Northern League (1999–2002); Northeast League (1995–1998)

Minor league titles
- League titles (2): 1996; 1999

Team data
- Name: Albany–Colonie Diamond Dogs (1995–2002)
- Ballpark: Heritage Park (1995–2002)

The Albany–Colonie Diamond Dogs were an independent baseball team based in Albany, New York from 1995 to 2002. The team played at Heritage Park in Colonie. The Diamond Dogs competed in the Northeast League from 1995 to 1998 and then in the Northern League when the two leagues merged prior to the 1999 season. The Diamond Dogs won the Northern League Championship in 1999. Their mascot was "Homer the Heritage Hound", a dog named for Heritage Park. Due to financial woes and competition from the new Tri-City ValleyCats, the Diamond Dogs folded after the 2002 season.

== Former affiliates (5 stations) ==
- WABY/1400: Albany (2000 season)
- WMVI/1160: Mechanicville (1996 season)
- WQBK/1300: Rensselaer (1997–1999 seasons)
- WTRY-FM/98.3: Rotterdam (2001–2002 seasons)
- WTRY/980: Troy (1995 season)

Achievements
| Preceded by Adirondack Lumberjacks; 1995 | Northeast League Champions; Albany-Colonie Diamond Dogs; 1996 | Succeeded by Elmira Pioneers; 1997 |
| Preceded by Fargo-Moorhead RedHawks; 1998 | Northern League Champions; Albany-Colonie Diamond Dogs; 1999 | Succeeded by Adirondack Lumberjacks; 2000 |
