= Mountain Dale, New York =

Mountaindale, New York
- Hamlet and CDP
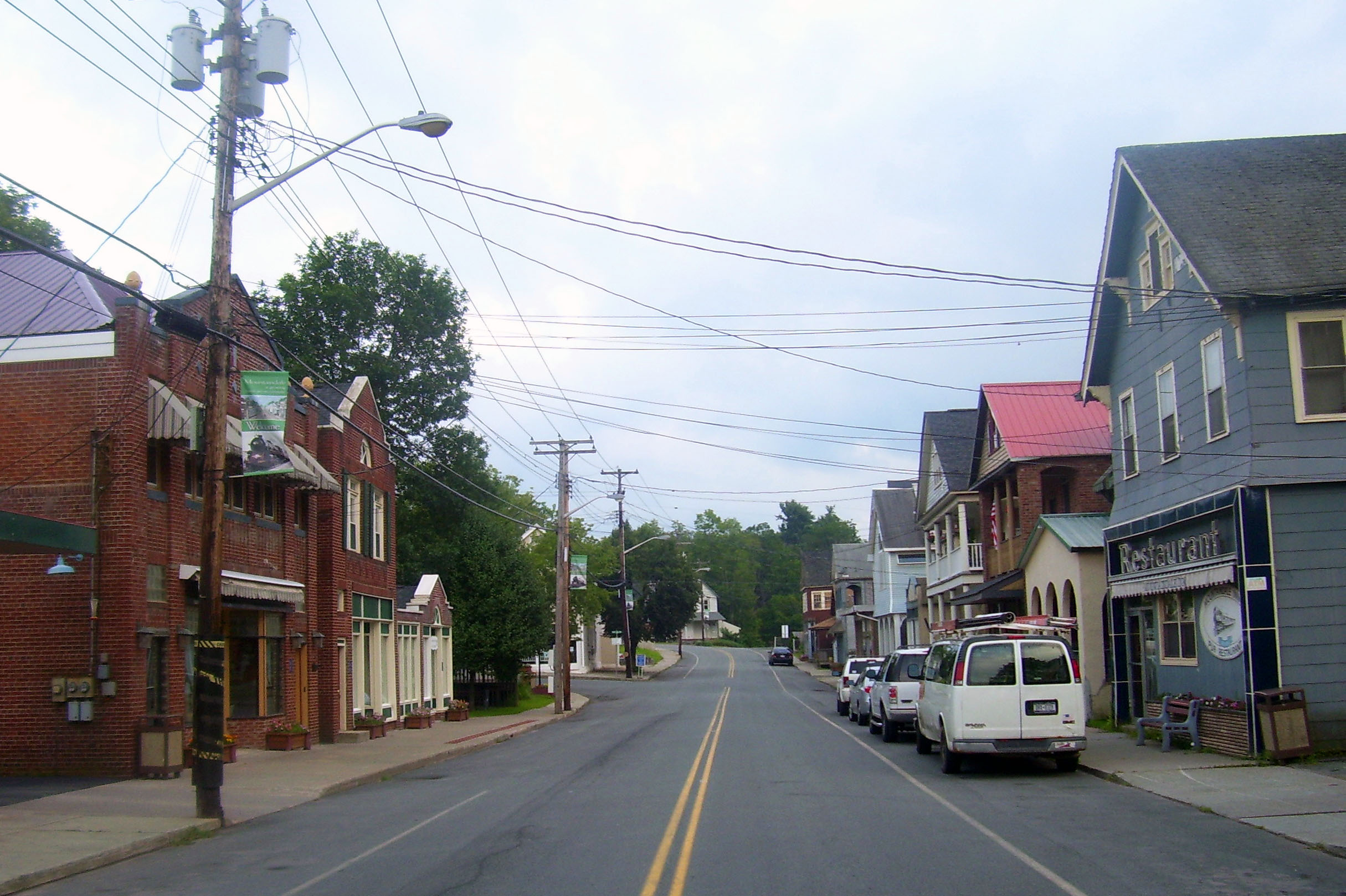
- Downtown Mountaindale

- Location within the state of New York
- Coordinates: 41°41′22″N 74°31′53″W
- Country: United States
- State: New York
- County: Sullivan
- Elevation: 1,010 ft (310 m)
- Time zone: UTC-5 (Eastern (EST))
  - Summer (DST): UTC-4 (EDT)
- GNIS feature ID: 957939

Mountaindale is a hamlet (and census-designated place) in the town of Fallsburg in Sullivan County, New York, United States, situated at an altitude of 1,010 feet (310 m). As of the 2020 census, Mountaindale had a population of 633.

== History ==
Mountaindale changed drastically in character from a rural farming hamlet, beginning with the arrival of the New York, Ontario & Western Railroad, and the name change of the local post office, in December 1880, from Sandburg(h) to Mountain Dale. Around that time a number of farmhouses that were more hotels than farms opened, and beginning in 1899 the ethnic character of the area began to change from predominantly gentile to predominantly Jewish.

By the time of the crash of 1929, several Jewish welfare organizations were engaged in resettling Jewish families whose breadwinners were unable, for health reasons, to make a living in the New York City sweatshops, onto subsistence farms in the Mountaindale area. While good-hearted this effort may have been, in some cases it simply replaced urban poverty with an even more extreme form of rural poverty.

Helen Brown, principal of Mountaindale High School in 1931, told stories of children being sewn into their long underwear in October to be cut out in April, and one particularly poignant story of a young man who played on Mountaindale High School's basketball team who broke a leg going up for a rebound when her husband had taken them to New York City to scrimmage the Columbia freshmen. The broken leg simply did not heal. Ultimately, it was discovered that the young man's diet at home did not contain any of the necessary nutrients—in fact, it consisted of little more than flour and water. Discovering that the poverty in the homes of most of the basketball players was equally dire, they undertook the practice of feeding the basketball team each Friday evening at their home in Liberty.

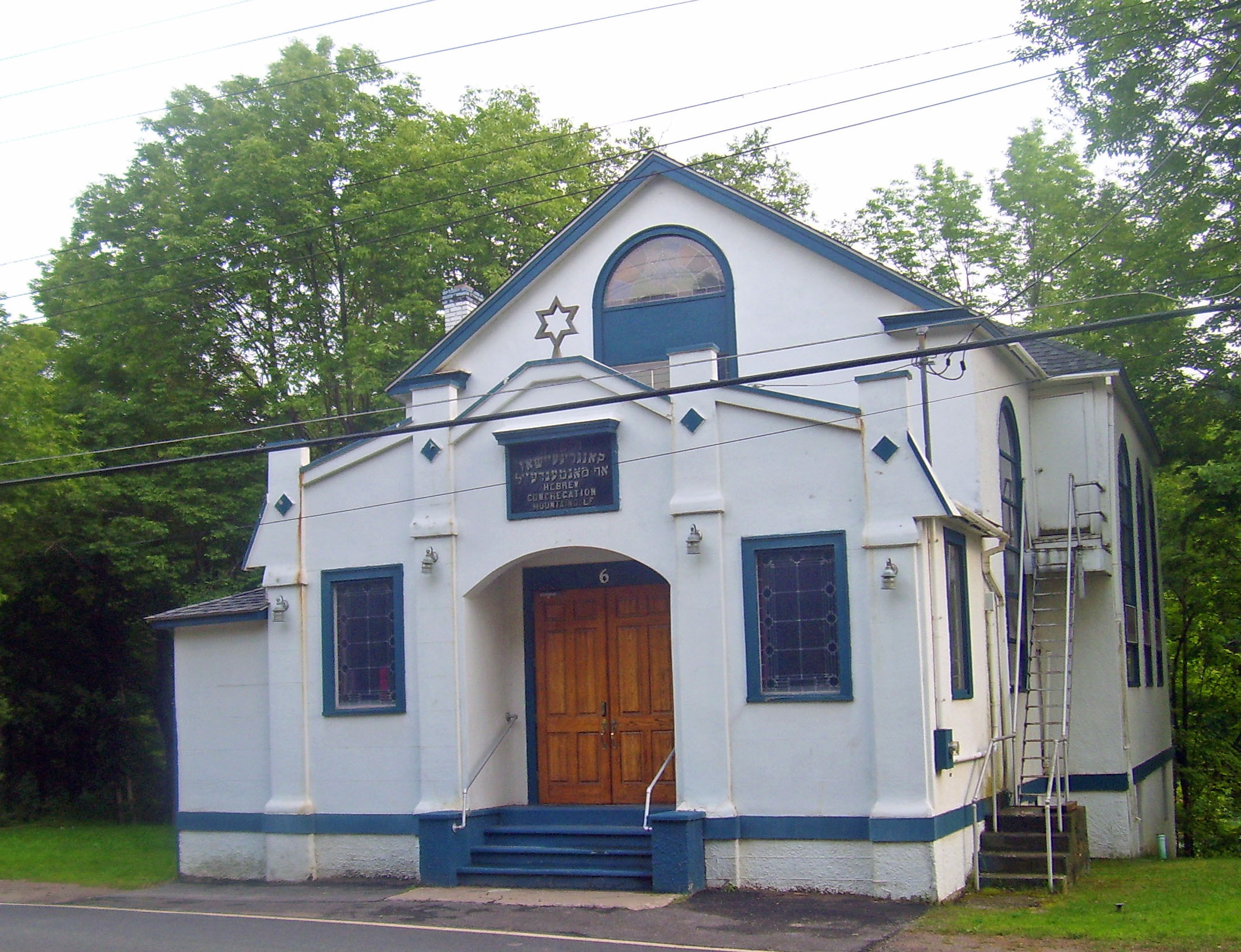
Hebrew Congregation of Mountaindale Synagogue

The hamlet is also famous for the "Yeshiva Zichron Mayir of Mountaindale", a school founded by Rabbi Yehuda Davis in 1960 in Brooklyn, NY. The school was moved to Mountaindale in 1974, and passed down to Rabbi Rothenberg, who died in early 2013.

The Hebrew Congregation of Mountaindale Synagogue was listed on the National Register of Historic Places in 2001.

=== Bach to Rock Festival ===
Mountaindale came within hours of hosting Bach to Rock Festival a concert intended to rival Woodstock in both scope and size. Some musicians and bands that were scheduled to perform in July 1970 were: The Kinks, Kathy Smith, Grateful Dead, Van Morrison, The Band, and more. For the month of August in 1970 the hamlet played host to over 50,000 hippies until a court order halted the concert less than one day before it was to open.

== Revitalization ==
Though there have been several attempts over the years to revitalize the hamlet, since 2018, Mountaindale has been experiencing a bit of a renaissance with new restaurants, retail and experiences opening up. A New York Times article documents the thoughts behind the changes.

=== Restaurants & Provisions ===
The Dale - featured by Eater as a top place to eat in the Catskills

High Voltage

Forage and Gather

Willow & Post

Sanburg Trading Post

Great Eye Finds: Vintage Clothing, home goods, vinyl, jewelry, books, glass, art.

=== Retail ===
Witchey Handmade Apothecary

Yin Spiritual Center

Forage and Gather

=== Experiences ===
Wild Bower Studio

Cinder Tracks

== Parks and recreation ==
Mountain Dale’s O&W Rails to Trails trailhead is located next to the hamlet’s basketball courts and Train Station-turned-Visitor Center, adjacent to the bicycle shop. The trail leads trail users into the Village of Woodridge next to Krieger Park- passing a small waterfall and large lake on the way.

Mountain Dale Park and Campground offers Camping, pool, propane station, picnic table, dog obstacle course/run, playground, recreation bldg., fishing, boating, boat launch.
