= Northeast League =

- Most recent season or competition: 2004 Northeast League season
- Sport: Baseball
- Founded: 1995 (original); 2003 (after de-merger with Northern League)
- Folded: 1999 (merged with Northern League); 2004
- No. of teams: 8
- Countries: United States; Canada
- Last champion: New Jersey Jackals
- Most titles: New Jersey Jackals (4, 2 if strictly Northeast League titles are counted)

The Northeast League was a professional independent baseball league that operated in the Northeastern United States from 1995 until 1998 and from 2003 until 2004. Between 1999 and 2002, the league was part of the Northern League after the two leagues agreed to merge. The league was superseded by the Canadian American Association of Professional Baseball, which its members joined for the 2005 season.

== Early history ==
For the first season, six teams played and were all based in southern and central New York. Albany (Albany Diamond Dogs), Glens Falls (Adirondack Lumberjacks), Yonkers (Yonkers Hoot Owls), Newburgh (Newburgh Night Hawks), Little Falls (Mohawk Valley Landsharks) and Mountaindale (Sullivan Mountain Lions) were all given teams and Adirondack won the first league championship in a 68-game season.

For 1996, things changed slightly. The Mountain Lions were sold to a new ownership group who renamed them the Catskill Cougars and moved them to the North Atlantic League while the Landsharks moved to West Warwick, Rhode Island, expanding the league into New England as the team became the Rhode Island Tiger Sharks. The Hoot Owls also folded and the league added a second New England team, the Bangor Blue Ox, and added Maine to its footprint in place of Yonkers. To replace the Mountain Lions/Cougars, an expansion team was granted to Elmira, New York, which had lost its New York–Penn League team when the Boston Red Sox chose to move the team to Massachusetts and rename them the Lowell Spinners. Like every other professional baseball team to play in Elmira since 1923, the expansion team was named the Pioneers. Albany won its first league title.

In 1997 the league expanded to eight teams and switched to a two-division format. Newburgh and Rhode Island folded after the 1996 season. As the result of the disbanding of the North Atlantic League Catskill rejoined the Northeast League and the Lynn, Massachusetts-based Massachusetts Mad Dogs followed them. Meanwhile, the league expanded into Waterbury, Connecticut, and Allentown, Pennsylvania, with the Waterbury Spirit and Allentown Ambassadors. The league was won by the Elmira Pioneers.

For 1998, the Diamond Dogs added the name of their actual home town, Colonie, to their name and became known as the Albany-Colonie Diamond Dogs. Bangor's team folded and the team's place was taken by the expansion New Jersey Jackals, who played in a then-unfinished Yogi Berra Stadium in Little Falls, New Jersey, on the campus of Montclair State University. The new franchise won the Northeast League championship in their first season.

After the season, prior to the merger with the Northern League, the Catskill franchise again folded. The Cougars would return as a member of the Northern League East in 2000 but would not last beyond that season.

== After the merger ==
After the four-year merger, the Northeast League returned to its status as a separate entity following the 2002 season. In that time, Northeast League teams won all four league titles as the Diamond Dogs, Lumberjacks, and Jackals defeated their Northern League opponents. The league returned to play in 2003 with eight teams. Elmira, Allentown, and New Jersey rejoined the league as they had left it. The Adirondack Lumberjacks relocated to Bangor, returning a team to Maine for the first time since the Blue Ox folded. Joining them were two Northern League expansion teams and two revived franchises. In 1999 and 2002, the Northern League expanded into Quebec City, Quebec, and Brockton, Massachusetts, and these two teams, Québec Capitales and the Brockton Rox, became part of the revived Northeast League.

Meanwhile, in 1999 and 2000, the Massachusetts Mad Dogs and the Waterbury Spirit franchises went dormant. The Mad Dogs were bought by Jonathan Fleisig, who moved the team to Pittsfield, Massachusetts, where they played in Wahconah Park as the Berkshire Black Bears. Nicholas Lopardo, meanwhile, bought the remnants of the Spirit and relaunched the team as the North Shore Spirit in the Mad Dogs' old home of Lynn, Massachusetts, at Fraser Field.

After the Rox won the 2003 league title, Berkshire moved to New Haven, Connecticut, as the New Haven County Cutters while Allentown folded and were replaced by a traveling team, the Northeast League Aces. The 2004 season, proving to be the final Northeast League season, New Jersey defeated North Shore in the league championship series. New Jersey, Brockton, North Shore, New Haven, Quebec, and Elmira became part of the Canadian American Association of Professional Baseball (or Can-Am League) along with an expansion franchise in Worcester, Massachusetts, and a traveling team formed when Bangor's charter for the new league was rescinded.

As of 2025, only two Northeast League teams still exist as professional clubs, with a third recently adopting the name of a former club. New Jersey and Quebec have existed continuously during this time and joined the Frontier League after it absorbed the Can-Am League. Brockton, meanwhile, rejoined the professional ranks with an expansion franchise in said league in 2024; after playing a season as the New England Knockouts alongside the original Rox, who became a collegiate summer league team, the Frontier League team was rebranded as the Rox and the original franchise was folded.

== League champions ==
Champions of the Northeast League, 1995–98

- 1995 Adirondack Lumberjacks
- 1996 Albany-Colonie Diamond Dogs
- 1997 Elmira Pioneers
- 1998 New Jersey Jackals

Champions of the Northern League

- 1999 Albany-Colonie Diamond Dogs
- 2000 Adirondack Lumberjacks
- 2001 New Jersey Jackals
- 2002 New Jersey Jackals

Champions of the Northeast League, 2003–2004

- 2003 Brockton Rox
- 2004 New Jersey Jackals
