= Elmira Pioneers =

Minor League Baseball team

- Logo

Information
- League: PGCBL (2011-Present) (West Division)
- Location: Elmira, New York
- Ballpark: Dunn Field
- Founded: 1888
- Nickname: Elmira Pioneers (1984–present)
- League championships: (NYSL): 1914 (Eastern League): 1937, 1938, 1941, 1943, 1962, 1964, 1966, 1971 (NYPL): 1976 (Northeast League): 1997 (NYCBL): 2007 (PGCBL): None
- Former name: Elmira Colonels (1885); Elmira Baseball Club (1888); Elmira Hottentots (1889); Elmira Gladiators (1891–1892); Elmira Pioneers (1895, 1900); Elmira Colonels (1908–1917); Elmira Red Jackets (1923); Elmira Colonels (1924–1931); Elmira Red Wings (1932–1934); Elmira Pioneers (1935–1936); Elmira Colonels (1937); Elmira Pioneers (1938–1955, 1957–1970); Elmira Royals (1971); Elmira Pioneers (1972–1973); Elmira Red Sox (1974–1976, 1978); Elmira Pioneer-Red Sox (1977); Elmira Pioneers (1979–1980); Elmira Suns (1981–1983)
- Former leagues: New York State League (1885); Central League (1888); New York State League (1889); New York–Penn League (1891); Eastern League (1892); New York State League (1895); Atlantic League (1900); Southern Tier League (1904–1905); New York State League (1900, 1908–1917); New York–Penn League (1923–1937); Eastern League (1938–1955); New York–Penn League (1957–1961); Eastern League (1962–1972); New York–Penn League (1973–1995); Northeast League (1996–1998); Northern League (1999–2002); Northeast League (2003–2004); Can-Am League (2005); New York Collegiate Baseball League (2006–2010)
- Colors: Red, Blue, White,

The Elmira Pioneers are a collegiate summer baseball team based in Elmira, New York. They have been affiliated with many major league teams throughout their history. Currently, Elmira Pioneers play as members of the Perfect Game Collegiate Baseball League (PGCBL). They play their home games at Dunn Field.

== History ==
=== 1885–1931: The early years ===
The Elmira Colonels played in the New York State League in 1885 and again in 1889. Two years later, the Elmira Gladiators were one of six teams in the original New York–Penn League. That league failed, but in 1892, the Gladiators were one of the original teams in the original Eastern League but only lasted one year in the league.

The Pioneers name first appeared in 1900, when the team joined a new New York State League that was founded a year earlier.

The Elmira Red Jackets, presumably named after the Seneca chief, were charter members of the new New York–Penn League in 1923. Armando Marsans, one of the first two Cubans to play Major League Baseball, served as their manager in 1923.

They changed their name to the Elmira Colonels from 1924–31 and remained unaffiliated through those years.

=== 1932–1972: Becoming a farm team ===
The Colonels signed on with the St. Louis Cardinals and changed their name to the Red Wings for the 1932–34 seasons. They resurrected the Pioneers name for their unaffiliated 1935 and '36 seasons. After winning the league championship that year, they signed on with the Brooklyn Dodgers and re-established the Colonels name for the 1937 season, in which they repeated as champions. The league became the Eastern League in 1938 and Elmira managed to pull off a three-peat that year. Elmira maintained their affiliation with the Dodgers, known as the Pioneers, through 1940 despite losing the home stadium to fire in 1938. On June 12, 1939, the Pioneers played their first night game in Elmira.

The Pioneers then became an affiliate of the Tigers and later the St Louis Browns before re-establishing ties with the Dodgers from 1950 to 1955. During the 1951 season, then-player Don Zimmer married his wife at a ceremony at home plate.

Elmira did not field a team in 1956, but joined the Class-A short-season New York–Penn League in 1957 as a Washington Senators affiliate. The Pioneers switched affiliation to the Philadelphia Phillies for the 1959–61 seasons. Two highlights of their time with the Phillies were Jim Guinn's 33-game hitting streak in 1959, and Vern Kemp striking out 21 batters in a single game during 1961. Both were team records.

The Pioneers returned to the Eastern League for the 1962 season, affiliated with the Baltimore Orioles, with whom they stayed through 1968. Their manager from 1962 to 1965 was Earl Weaver. The team won the championship in 1962. In 1965 there were three no-hitters pitched and Lou Pinella hit three home runs in a single game. They also played a 27-inning game, which at the time was the longest professionally played game. The following year, they won the pennant with a 20.5 game lead over the second-place team.

The 1960s ended with the Padres and Royals sharing the Pioneers for a year. The next two years, the team was exclusively affiliated with the Royals and was known as the Elmira Royals in 1971, when they won another championship. The team signed on with the Cleveland Indians for 1972, but a flood ruined the season.

=== 1973–1996: The Red Sox years and move to Lowell, Massachusetts ===
The New York–Penn League affiliate of the Boston Red Sox moved from Williamsport, Pennsylvania, to Elmira for the 1973 season, and remained there through 1992. The 1973 team was known as the Pioneers, but the team was called the Elmira Red Sox for four seasons (1974–1976, 1978) and Elmira Pioneer-Red Sox in 1977. They won the New York-Penn League Championship in 1976. The Pioneers name returned for the 1979 season, though the team actually wore "Red Sox" uniforms.

In 1981, Lou Eliopulos bought the team and changed its name to the Elmira Suns to match other teams he owned. The name proved unpopular in Elmira and the Pioneers name returned in 1984, complete with uniforms featuring a stagecoach logo and uniforms that were mocked throughout the league as resembling softball uniforms. Clyde Smoll Jr. (son of former major league pitcher Clyde Smoll) bought the team in 1986 and brought back the Red Sox uniforms.

The Pioneers were affiliated with the Florida Marlins from 1993 to 1995, after which Smoll moved the team to Lowell, Massachusetts, and reaffiliated with the Red Sox as the Lowell Spinners.

=== 1996–2006: A new team in the Northeast League ===
After some significant scrambling, an ownership group anchored by an Elmira native living in Maryland, John Ervin, got a new Pioneers team into the independent Northeast League before the 1996 season began. The following year, the Pioneers defeated the defending champion Albany-Colonie Diamond Dogs two games to none to win their first championship in 21 years.

Pitcher Greg Keagle threw the first no-hitter in team history the summer of 2000. He became a player-coach in 2001 and 2002. In 2001, the team played for the championship again. This time they faced the New Jersey Jackals, losing three games to two.

== Championship history ==
The Pioneers have won 13 titles in various leagues:

- New York State League: 1914
- Eastern League: 1937, 1938, 1941, 1943, 1962, 1964, 1966, 1971
- New York-Penn League: 1976
- Northeast League: 1997
- New York Collegiate Baseball League: 2007

== Notable Pioneers ==
=== Hall of Fame alumni ===
- Wade Boggs (1976) Inducted, 2005
- Pat Gillick (1963) Inducted, 2011
- Jim Palmer (1968) Inducted, 1990
- Rabbit Maranville (1936, MGR) Inducted, 1954
- Earl Weaver (1962–1965, MGR) Inducted, 1996

=== Notable alumni ===
- Armando Marsans (1923, MGR)
- Sam Nahem (1938)
- Jack Ogden (1941; as owner)
- Bill Sharman (1950) Basketball Naismith Hall of Fame, Inducted 1976
- Don Zimmer (1951)
- Tommy Holmes (1954; as manager)
- Steve Dalkowski (1962–1964; known as "the hardest throwing pitcher that never made the Major Leagues.")
- Curt Blefary (1963)
- Davey Johnson (1963)
- Darold Knowles (1963)
- Tom Phoebus (1963)
- Larry Haney (1963–1964)
- Paul Blair (1964)
- Andy Etchebarren (1964)
- Eddie Watt (1964–1965)
- Lou Piniella (1965)
- Mark Belanger (1965)
- Jim Hardin (1966)
- Cal Ripken, Sr. (1968, MGR)
- Don Baylor (1968)
- John Candelaria (1968)
- Bo Díaz (1973)
- Bob Stanley (1974)
- Glenn Hoffman (1976)
- Bruce Hurst (1976)
- Bob Ojeda (1978)
- Oil Can Boyd (1980)
- Sam Horn (1982)
- Mike Greenwell (1982)
- Ellis Burks (1983)
- Brady Anderson (1985)
- Curt Schilling (1986)
- John Valentin (1988)
- Eric Wedge (1989)
- Cory Bailey (1991)
- Frank Rodriguez (1991)
- Tony Rodríguez (1991)
- Joel Bennett (1991)
- Randy Winn (1995)
- Greg Keagle (2000–2002, 2004–2005)
- Jordan Westburg (2018)

Achievements
Preceded by Albany-Colonie Diamond Dogs; 1996	Northeast League Champions; Elmira Pioneers; 1997	Succeeded by New Jersey Jackals; 1998
