= North Shore Spirit =

Minor-league baseball team in Lynn, Massachusetts

Logo
Cap insignia

Information
- League: Can-Am League (2003–2007)
- Location: Lynn, Massachusetts
- Ballpark: Fraser Field (2003–2007)
- Founded: 2003
- Folded: 2007
- League championships: None
- Former name: North Shore Spirit (2003–2007); Waterbury Spirit (1997–2000)
- Former league: Northeast League (1997–2000)
- Former ballpark: Municipal Stadium (1997–2000)
- Colors: Red, White, Blue
- Ownership: Nick Lopardo
- General manager: Brent Connolly
- Manager: John Kennedy, Vic Davilla
- Media: Lynn Daily Item
- Website: www.northshorespirit.com

The North Shore Spirit was a minor-league baseball team based in Lynn, Massachusetts from 2003 to 2007. The Spirit played in the Canadian American Association of Professional Baseball, an independent league that is not affiliated with Major League Baseball or with the Minor League Baseball organization. The team was originally known as the Waterbury Spirit, based out of Waterbury, Connecticut.

The Spirit were owned by Nicholas Lopardo throughout their five-year history in Lynn.

== Team history ==
=== Waterbury Spirit ===
Waterbury Spirit Logo

The Waterbury Spirit began play in 1997 in the Northeast League. During the team's four-year stint in Connecticut, they made the playoffs three times, losing in the first round all three times. The team folded following the 2000 season. Originally, the team was to be known as the "Waterbury Wizards" but a potential lawsuit with the Fort Wayne Wizards prompted the team to seek alternate names.

=== Reborn in the North Shore ===
Lopardo acquired the team in 2002 when he purchased the inactive franchise. After the formation of the team was announced in August 2002, Lopardo funded a massive, expensive renovation of Fraser Field. $2 million was put into improvements in seating, comfort, and technology of the field, including the installation of FieldTurf in the infield.

In their first season, 2003, 90,000 people attended Spirit games, a record for pro baseball at Fraser Field. In the 2003 season, the Spirit won the first-half North Division championship and defeated the Quebec Capitales in the first round of the playoffs, 3 games to 0, then were swept by the Brockton Rox, 3 games to 0, in the league championship series, giving Brockton the Northeast League title. Another highlight of the 2003 season was a game against the New Jersey Jackals in which the Spirit set over 15 Northeast League records by scoring 14 runs in one inning. On the field, the team featured two players who were signed by Major League Baseball organizations: outfielder Carlos Sepulveda, by the Florida Marlins and second baseman Marcos Agramonte, by the San Diego Padres. Also in that year the team held a ceremony honoring legendary North Shore baseball player Tony Conigliaro and retiring his number 25.

Spirit Secondary Logo

In 2004 the Spirit played host to 120,000 fans, breaking the record they had set the year before, and ranking third in league attendance behind the Brockton Rox and Quebec Capitales. They once again won the first-half North Division Championship, in record fashion, shattering the league record for first half winning percentage with 35 wins in the 46 game half. The Spirit also once again defeated the Quebec Capitales in the first round of the playoffs, 3 games to 2. However, just as in 2003, the Spirit fell in the league championship series, this time to the New Jersey Jackals. The Spirit won the first two games of the series at Yogi Berra Stadium, but dropped the three games at Fraser Field (two after blowing late inning leads and losing in extra innings).

In 2004 the Spirit honored another local baseball legend, Johnny Pesky, affectionately known as "Mr. Red Sox." The team featured two more players who would be picked up by Major League Organizations, this time, two pitchers: John Kelly and Jeremy Sugarman, who were signed by the Seattle Mariners and Cincinnati Reds, respectively.

2005 was the first year that the Spirit failed to make the playoffs, but nonetheless they had a good season, finishing with the 2nd best record in the league behind Quebec and drawing over 100,000 fans to Fraser Field for the second consecutive season. On September 3, 2005, the last home game of the season, owner Nick Lopardo responded to rumors of the franchise's demise with an emphatic assurance that the Spirit would be back for their fourth season at Fraser Field.

Can-Am League and North Shore Spirit history was made in April 2006 as ex-Spirit player Ken Ray made his team debut for the Atlanta Braves, striking out Barry Bonds as part of a 1-2-3 inning against the San Francisco Giants. Ray became a mainstay in the Atlanta bullpen that season and even served as the team's closer for a time.

On July 12, 2006, the Spirit won their third first-half championship in franchise history, qualifying for the 2006 Can-Am League Playoffs. They went on to have the most successful regular season in Can-Am League history.

In the 2006 playoffs, the Spirit were defeated in the first round by the Quebec Capitales, 3-2, splitting the first two games at Fraser Field and then losing two out of three in Quebec City.

Rumors were rampant in late 2006 that the Spirit would leave Lynn, but in November the team confirmed that it would return for a fifth season at Fraser Field, set to begin on May 25, 2007.

In September, 2007, after the 2007 Can-Am playoffs, Nick Lopardo announced that he would cease operations. Their final game was a 6-4 home loss against the Nashua Pride in the third game of the Can-Am League Championship Series. The Spirit were swept 3-0. The attendance in the final game was 803.

Spirit games were broadcast on WESX and WWZN 1510-AM by veteran play-by-play announcer John Leahy.

North Shore's team colors were Red, White and Blue. Their mascot, Slugger, was a blue bald eagle.

(The Spirit were followed by the North Shore Navigators, a summer collegiate baseball team, from the Futures Collegiate Baseball League.)

== Retired numbers ==
- 6 - Harry Agganis and Johnny Pesky - North Shore area residents who both played for the Boston Red Sox
- 17 - Dick Radatz - former All-Star Boston Red Sox relief pitcher and Spirit pitching coach who died March, 2005
- 25 - Tony Conigliaro - Revere resident who played for the Boston Red Sox
