= Argenis (disambiguation) =

Argenis may refer to:

- Argenis, a book by John Barclay
- Argenis (bug), a genus of insects in the tribe Mirini
- Argenis (wrestler), a professional wrestler

== See also ==
- Argenis Reyes (born 1982), Dominican baseball player
