= Roniel =

Roniel López is a given name. It may refer to:

- Roniel Iglesias (born 1988), Cuban boxer
- Roniel Campos (born 1993), Venezuelan cyclist
- Roniel (footballer) (born 1994), Roniel Basqueball
- Roniel Raudes (born 1998), Roniel baseball player
