= New Jersey Jackals =

Frontier League baseball team in Paterson

- Founded in 1998 in Little Falls, New Jersey; Based in Paterson, New Jersey since 2023

Team logo	Cap insignia

Minor league affiliations
- League: National Association of Professional Baseball (2020–present)
- Conference: Atlantic Conference
- Division: East Division
- Previous leagues: All-American Baseball Challenge (2020); Can-Am League (2005–2019); Northeast League (1998, 2003–04); Northern League (1999–2002)

Minor league titles
- League titles (6): 1998; 2001; 2002; 2004; 2019; 2020
- Division titles (5): 1999; 2002; 2003; 2004; 2026
- First-half titles (7): 1998; 1999; 2002; 2003; 2004; 2007; 2009
- Second-half titles (4): 2002; 2003; 2004; 2011

Team data
- Name: New Jersey Jackals (1998–present)
- Colors: Red, black, gray, white
- Mascot: Jack the Jackal
- Ballpark: Hinchliffe Stadium (2023–present)
- Previous parks: Yogi Berra Stadium (1998–2022)
- Owner/ Operator: Baye Adofo-Wilson
- General manager: V. George Moreira
- Manager: Joe Testa
- Media: HomeTeam Network
- Website: jackals.com

The New Jersey Jackals are a professional baseball team based in Paterson, New Jersey. The Jackals compete in the National Association of Professional Baseball (NAPB) as a member of the East Division in the Atlantic Conference. The team was founded in 1998 by Floyd Hall and is owned by Baye Adofo-Wilson who also owns the New York Cosmos. The Jackals play their home games at former Negro leagues ballpark Hinchliffe Stadium. They were previously members of the Northeast League, Northern League, Can-Am League, and All-American Baseball Challenge.

The Jackals have a rivalry with their cross-Hudson River neighbor New York Boulders, the Québec Capitales, as well as the Sussex County Miners (Battle of New Jersey). The Jackals are one of three Frontier League teams in the New York metropolitan area; the others are the Boulders and the Miners.

== Team history ==
=== 1998: Inaugural season ===
The Jackals were founded in 1998 and replaced the Bangor Blue Ox in the Northeast League after that franchise folded. Kash Beauchamp was named the team's first manager and they began play on May 30, 1998, against the Waterbury Spirit, where they won both games of a doubleheader.

The Jackals' first home game was played at a yet-to-be-finished Yogi Berra Stadium on June 5. Facing the Albany-Colonie Diamond Dogs, New Jersey went to extra innings before winning 2–1 in the thirteenth on a home run by Gary Collum.

The Jackals finished the regular season with 53 wins, most in the league, and won the first half championship, which ensured a place in the Northeast League playoffs. They would defeat the Allentown Ambassadors in their first playoff series, then face Albany-Colonie again for the league championship. The Jackals defeated the Diamond Dogs 2–0 in a best of three series to win their first league championship.

=== 1999–2000: Entering a new league ===
The Jackals became members of the Northern League for the 1999 season after the league decided to absorb the Northeast League. The Jackals became part of the new Northern League East Division.

The Jackals won 45 games in 1999 and again qualified for the playoffs, knocking off Allentown in their first playoff matchup before falling to Albany-Colonie in a rematch of their league championship series from 1998.

The Jackals received the honor of hosting the Northern League All-Star Game in 2000. 4,211 fans showed up to watch the game, which saw the East defeat the Central Division 10–5. It was one of the year's highlights, but there were not many others as the Jackals struggled throughout the season. A 31–52 record placed the team last in the division, and following the season Kash Beauchamp announced his resignation after three seasons.

=== 2001–2004: Champions ===
George Tsamis was hired to take over the Jackals for 2001. He had lost his job as manager in Waterbury following the 2000 season when the Spirit suspended operations.

The Jackals again found struggles, but managed to pull together 45 victories against 45 losses. They qualified for the Northern League playoffs for the second time in three years as a wild card and once again won their first round series, sweeping Albany-Colonie.

Shortly after the Jackals' win over the Diamond Dogs, the September 11 attacks occurred and threw the rest of the playoffs into doubt. After discussion the Northern League determined that they would continue to play and the Jackals resumed their championship quest against the Elmira Pioneers on September 17. In a five-game series, New Jersey emerged victorious and advanced to the Northern League Championship Series against the Winnipeg Goldeyes, whom they defeated in four games to win their second league championship.

=== 2002 ===
The 2002 Jackals season was historic on two fronts. The first historic moment came when Jeremy Callier threw a no-hitter on August 28 against the Berkshire Black Bears, requiring a home run by Ryan Kane in the bottom of the ninth inning to make it official.

The second piece of team history saw the Jackals set a team record for victories, finishing with 62 to lead the league.

In the playoffs, however, the Jackals had problems. In the first round, they took the first two against Elmira before the Pioneers won the next two to tie the series. The Jackals emerged victorious in five games.

Then, in the Northern League East Championship Series against Adirondack, the Jackals were down to their final out in Game 5 trailing 2–1 when Dave Callahan hit a double with the bases loaded to score all three runners and give the team a 4–2 victory. The Jackals capped it off with their second straight victory over Winnipeg in the Northern League Championship Series, defeating the Goldeyes 3 games to 1.

=== 2003 ===
2003 saw two major changes for the Jackals. First George Tsamis resigned to take the managerial position with the St. Paul Saints, New Jersey hired Gary SouthShore RailCats manager Joe Calfapietra to take his place. The second saw the end of the merger with the Northern League, as the Northeast League once again became its own entity. The Jackals finished 52–37 and returned to the playoffs for a third consecutive year by winning both halves of the season in their division, but were dispatched in the first round by the eventual league champion Brockton Rox.

=== 2004 ===
In 2004, New Jersey improved their record to what was then the team's second-best showing in its history, winning 54 games and losing 29. However, the first half of the season required saw the Jackals end in a tie with the New Haven County Cutters, requiring a one-game playoff which New Jersey won for their fifth consecutive half-season victory. The Jackals pulled away in the second half with a 28–18 record, winning both halves for a third straight year.

The Jackals beat the Bangor Lumberjacks in the opening round of the playoffs, then found themselves in trouble against the North Shore Spirit in the league championship series. Trailing two games to none and down late in the third game, the Jackals rallied for an extra inning victory. They duplicated the feat the next day in Game 4 to tie the series, and then won the fifth and deciding game to take the Northeast League Championship. It would be the fourth league championship for the Jackals, but would be their last for over a decade.

=== 2005 ===
In 2005 the Jackals joined the 8-team Can-Am League but failed to make the playoffs for the first time since 2000 despite posting a winning record of 48–44. Outfielder Zach Smithlin led the league with 135 hits and a .358 batting average, while second baseman Ricardo Cordova also topped .350 and was named to the All-Star team. Pitcher Joel Bennett recorded a 2.68 ERA and an 11–2 record in his abbreviated season and also garnered All-Star consideration.

=== 2006 ===
2006 saw another history-making performance as Aaron Myers threw the second no-hitter in team history, but New Jersey again missed the playoffs and—with a 43–48 record—finished with only their second losing record in team history. The Jackals’ major bright spot was veteran minor league John Lindsey, who led the team in home runs but was signed away from the team in the second half of the season. Joel Bennett and Raul Valdes both led the Jackals in wins with seven, while Isaac Pavlik and Joe Orloski each recorded six.

=== 2007 ===
The Jackals returned to the playoffs as they won the Can-Am League First Half Championship in 2007 with a 31–15 record, guaranteeing them a spot in the playoffs. Their 31 wins in the first half still mark a franchise best in the first half, and second most in a half (32 in 2002). The Jackals' second half was not as strong, as they finished in last place with an 18–29 record. New Jersey took the Nashua Pride to a fifth game at Yogi Berra Stadium in their best-of-five series before losing and getting knocked out.

The Jackals’ leading hitter was returning catcher Sandy Madera, who hit .364 with 21 home runs and 75 RBI. Zach Smithlin stole 33 bases, marking the fourth consecutive year where he recorded at least 25.

After the season, Joel Bennett retired from professional baseball. He finished his final season with a 3–2 record.

=== 2008 ===
The Jackals missed the playoffs in 2008, finishing 43–51.

In a ceremony prior to their game on August 22 vs. the Brockton Rox, the Jackals retired pitcher Joel Bennett’s number 28.

The Jackals total attendance in 2008 was 103,817. Averaging 2,209 per game.

=== 2009 ===
New Jersey was able to ride a CanAm League record 14 game winning streak to a First Half Championship in 2009 with a 28–19 record, once again guaranteeing the team a playoff spot. The Jackals won 27 games in the second half for a total of 55, the second most in team history. Despite that, New Jersey was eliminated from the playoffs by the Worcester Tornadoes.

=== 2010 ===
In 2010, the Jackals slipped in the first half, finishing fourth with a 19–27 record. The team battled back to a 23–23 record in the second half, beating out the Worcester Tornadoes by 0.5 game for the fourth and final playoff spot. The Jackals were swept by Québec three games to none in the opening round.

=== 2011 ===
The Jackals finished the regular season 57–36, the second most season wins in franchise history behind the 62 wins the 2002 team put up. Despite an impressive record, the Jackals were unable to win either half of the regular season (Québec won both halves), and finished second of the eight teams.

On July 30, the Jackals retired Zack Smithlin's #4 jersey in a pregame ceremony.

Jackals pitcher Isaac Pavlik made a close run for the pitching triple crown, finishing the regular season atop the league in wins and strikeouts, but third in ERA.

The Jackals defeated the Pittsfield Colonials to advance to the Can-Am League Championship Series, losing again to Québec.

=== 2012 ===
The Jackals completed the season second overall with a 59–41 record. They once again faced the Capitales in the championship series, which was extended to a best-of-seven, but again lost.

Jackals 3B Nick Giarraputo was named the Can-Am League's 2012 Player of the Year.

=== 2013 ===
The Jackals finished at 55–44, in second place. Québec loomed in the league championship series again, and the Jackals rallied from three games to one down to force a seventh game which the Capitales won.

=== 2014 ===
With the Newark Bears ceasing operations after the 2013 season, the Can-Am League was down to just 4 teams for 2014. The New Jersey Jackals, Rockland Boulders, Trois-Rivières Aigles, & Québec Capitales.

More inter-league play with American Association kept the Can-Am afloat, while allowing the league to maintain its own separate identity.

The Jackals hosted the St. Paul Saints, Winnipeg Goldeyes, & Lincoln Saltdogs going 4–5.

The Winnipeg Goldeyes returned to Yogi Berra Stadium on June 17, 2014, for the first time since losing the Northern League Championship to NJ on September 21, 2002. A span of 4,287 days between games.

Jackals manager Joe Calfapietra recorded his 700th managerial win on July 7, a 4–3 victory over the Capitales at Stade Municipal.

NJ visited the Sioux Falls Canaries, St. Paul Saints, & Winnipeg Goldeyes in August. Going 5–4 on the road trip.

On August 25, the Jackals eliminated the Québec Capitales (winners of 5 consecutive League Championships) & earned themselves a 13th postseason appearance in 17 years with a 7–3 home victory. The Jackals finished one game behind their rivals, the Boulders, with a 55–41 record.

New Jersey lost its fourth consecutive league championship series, falling in six games to Rockland after winning the first two at home.

9/3 – Jackals 3, Boulders 2

9/4 – Jackals 3, Boulders 2

9/5 – Boulders 5, Jackals 4

9/6 – Boulders 8, Jackals 7 10 Innings

9/7 – Boulders 14, Jackals 4

9/8 – Boulders 4, Jackals 0

(Rockland wins series 4–2)

The Jackals total attendance in 2014 was 76,423. Averaging 1,661 per game.

=== 2015 ===
In 2015 the Sussex County Miners & the Ottawa Champions were added to the Can-Am League.

The Garden State Grays played 60 games, & the Shikoku Island League All-Stars played 16 games.

The Jackals finished third in the league with a 54–43 in 2015, earning a playoff spot for the 7th consecutive season. New Jersey defeated Québec for the first time in a post season series.

9/9 Jackals 4, Québec 3

9/11 Québec 4, Jackals 3

9/12 Québec 11, Jackals 5

9/13 Jackals 5, Québec 2

9/15 Jackals 5, Québec 4

(NJ wins series 3–2)

NJ earns a fifth straight trip to the League Championship Series.

The Jackals fell to Trois-Rivières in 5 games, losing their fifth straight CanAm League championship series.

9/16 Aigles 12, Jackals 0

9/17 Jackals 8, Aigles 6

9/18 Aigles 7, Jackals 3

9/19 Jackals 7, Aigles 5

9/20 Aigles 2, Jackals 1

(Aigles wins series 3–2)

Despite winning 4 of the franchise's first five trips to a league championship, the Jackals were winless in their last five.

On July 17, 2015, the Jackals participated in the 1st ever Can-Am League Cooperstown Classic at Historic Doubleday Field in Cooperstown, NY. New Jersey faced their rivals across the Hudson River, the Rockland Boulders by defeating them with a score of 9–1.

Combining the regular & post seasons, NJ plays a team record 107 games in 2015.

The Jackals total attendance in 2015 was 78,913. Averaging 1,578 per game.

=== 2016 ===
In the 2016 season, the Jackals finished in first place with a 62–38 record, which tied the team record for victories in a season.

However, they lost in the opening round of the playoffs to the Ottawa Champions, three games to one:

Sep. 7: Jackals 11, Ottawa 2

Sep. 8: Ottawa 4, Jackals 3

Sep. 9: Ottawa 8, Jackals 3

Sep. 10: Ottawa 7, Jackals 2

First baseman Art Charles, however, set league records in slugging percentage, extra base hits and total bases en route to being named the 2016 Baseball America Independent Leagues Player of the Year.

Jackals manager Joe Calfapietra recorded his 800th managerial win on June 6, a 19–3 victory over the Sussex County Miners at Skylands Stadium.

Jackals played the Cuban national team in a three-game series at Yogi Berra Stadium, on June 27–29.

Game 1: Cuba 9, Jackals 4 (7-inning game)

Game 2: Jackals 3, Cuba 1

Game 3: Jackals 5, Cuba 3

New Jersey sets a Can-Am Team record with 46 triples in a season.

The Jackals' total attendance in 2016, was 74,335, an average of 1,652 per home game, the lowest in franchise history.

Following the season, manager Joe Calfapietra announced he was leaving the team after fourteen seasons to take over the managerial position with the American Association's Kansas City T-Bones.

=== 2017 ===
The team's bench coach, Matt Padgett, was promoted to manager in February 2017.

Al Dorso purchases the Jackals franchise in May 2017. To be operated as University Sports and Entertainment, LLC.

The Jackals begin their 20th season on May 18, 2017, with an 8–4 victory over Québec at Yogi Berra Stadium.

NJ swept a 3-game series from a Dominican Republic squad in June. They also swept 4 from the Cuban National Team in their second appearance at Yogi Berra Stadium.

The Jackals finished at 55–45 & qualified for the playoffs for the 16th time in 20 seasons, but were eliminated by their cross-river rival Rockland Boulders in the opening round:

9/7 – Boulders 3, Jackals 1

9/8 – Boulders 5, Jackals 0

9/9 – Jackals 7, Boulders 1

9/10 – Boulders 9, Jackals 1

(Rockland wins series 3–1)

During the 2017 season, pitcher Johnny Hellweg signed with the Pittsburgh Pirates and first baseman Conrad Gregor signed with the Boston Red Sox organization.

On July 20, 2017, the Jackals recorded their 1,000th regular season win. A 9–3 victory over Trois-Rivieres. Winning pitcher, Isaac Pavlik.

On August 2, 2017, Isaac Pavlik records his 1,000th career strikeout as a Jackal, during an 8–2 victory over Ottawa.

The Jackals total attendance in 2017 was 91,892. Averaging 1,767 per game.

After the 2017 season, Jackals Manager Matt Padgett announced he was not returning in 2018. The team announced on December 18, 2017, that his replacement would be Brooks Carey, who had spent the previous five seasons managing the Normal CornBelters of the Frontier League.

=== 2018 ===
In 2018 the Jackals finished the year with a 50–52 record. Their first losing season since 2010 ending their run of 9 consecutive post season appearances.

In a game started on May 31 and completed on July 5, NJ hits a CanAm record 7 home runs en route to a 23–8 victory over Ottawa.

On August 7, in game starting at 8:51pm, Eduar Lopez tossed the 3rd no-hitter in franchise history as the Jackals defeated the Ottawa Champions, 5–0. He faced 28 batters, 1BB, 4K's, 92 pitches.

The Jackals total attendance in 2018 was 83,610. Averaging 1,706 per game.

=== 2019 ===
The CanAm League commemorated its 15th season in 2019.

The Jackals opened their 22nd season in Ottawa on May 17, with a 10 inning 6–5 victory.

They won their 2019 Home opener on May 24 vs. the Trois-Rivières Aigles by a score of 4–1.

The Can-Am International Series continued in 2019. NJ played the Shikoku Island Independents & Cuban National Team for the 3rd time.

On July 3 the Jackals played in their 2,000th regular season game. Recording a 12–8 victory over Québec @ YBS.

Following their August 23 victory over Ottawa, the Jackals qualified for their 17th post season appearance in their 22-year history.

In a ceremony before their game on August 24 the Jackals officially unveiled their POW/MIA Chair of Honor. A POW/MIA Chair of Honor is an empty seat that serves as a symbol to remind everyone to never forget our servicemen who made the ultimate sacrifice. The team partnered with Rolling Thunder, Inc. in the dedication.

In a ceremony prior to their August 29 game, vs. the Sussex County Miners, the Jackals officially retired Isaac Pavlik's number 7.

Jackals OF Alfredo Marte was named the Can-Am League's 2019 Player of the Year.

Conrad Gregor had 49 stolen bases & 82 Walks during the 2019 season, both new team records.

NJ set a new team record with 142 Stolen Bases in 2019.

NJ finished the Can-Am regular season in 3rd place with a record of 48–46.

In the opening round of the playoffs, the Jackals defeated the Trois-Rivières Aigles.

9/4 Jackals 3, Aigles 0 @ YBS

9/5 Aigles 5, Jackals 0 @ YBS

9/6 Jackals 7, Aigles 2 @ TR

9/7 Aigles 17, Jackals 4 @ TR

9/8 Jackals 4, Aigles 3, 10 Innings @ TR

(NJ wins series 3–2)

Jackals advanced to the Can-Am League Championship Series vs. the Sussex County Miners and defeated them 3–1 to earn their first championship in 15 years.

9/10 Jackals 3, Miners 2, 10 Innings @ YBS

9/12 Miners 12, Jackals 3 @ YBS

9/13 Jackals 2, Miners 0 @ Skylands Stadium

9/14, Jackals 8, Miners 7 @ Skylands Stadium

Win 1st Can-Am League Championship, 5th team Championship.

The New Jersey Jackals franchise now has won championships in 3 different independent leagues:

(2) Northeast League 1998, 2004 (2) Northern League 2001, 2002 (1) Can-Am League 2019

The Jackals total attendance in 2019 was 76,658. Averaging 1,742 per game.

=== 2020: Frontier League era, COVID-19 and pivot to All-American Baseball Challenge ===
On October 16, 2019, it was announced the New Jersey Jackals joined the 14 team Frontier League, along with the New York Boulders, Québec Capitales, Sussex County Miners and Trois-Rivières Aigles. They planned to play in the 7 team Can-Am Division with the Lake Erie Crushers and Washington Wild Things. The merger created the largest league in all of Independent Professional Baseball. The Jackals were scheduled to open their inaugural Frontier League season on the road May 14 vs. the Florence Y'alls, with their home opener was scheduled for May 22 vs. the Québec Capitales. On April 1, 2020, the Frontier League officially delayed the scheduled start of their 2020 season, due to the COVID-19 pandemic. On June 24, 2020, the Frontier League announced that the 2020 championship season was suspended due to ongoing gathering and travel restrictions in many locations.

On July 14, 2020, the Jackals announced the 6-team All-American Baseball Challenge for the 2020 season. Initially, a 32 game, 8-week regular season was reported, but as games not played due to inclement weather were canceled, teams wound up playing fewer games. All games were scheduled for 7 innings and held on Thursday, Friday, Saturday, and Sunday. The Jackals and the Jersey Wise Guys played at Yogi Berra Stadium. The Sussex County Miners and Skylands Cardinals played at Skylands Stadium, Rockland Boulders and New York Brave playing at Palisades Credit Union Park. On July 23, the Jackals defeated the Jersey Wise Guys 10–3 to open the season. The Jackals finished the regular season 12–10 finishing in 3rd place. They won their first playoff game in Rockland over the Boulders by a score of 11–2. On September 12, the Jackals won the Championship by defeating the New York Brave 3–2 at Yogi Berra Stadium.

=== 2021: First Frontier League season ===
In 2021, the New Jersey Jackals played their 24th consecutive season, their first as a member of the 14 team Frontier League. They were one of three teams in the Northeast Division of the Can-Am Conference along with the Sussex County Miners and Washington Wild Things. They also played the conference’s Atlantic Division teams, Équipe Québec, New York Boulders, and Tri-City ValleyCats. The Florence Y'alls were their only Midwestern conference opponent. Their inaugural games were victories on the road May 27 and at home on May 29, both against the New York Boulders. The Jackals missed the playoffs for the first time since 2018, finishing with a 39–56 record. The Jackals' total attendance in 2021 was 43,722. Averaging 1,041 per game.

=== 2022: The final year at Yogi Berra Stadium ===
In 2022, the Jackals played their 25th season. Their season began on May 13 where they defeated the Evansville Otters 9–5 on the road. On September 2, pitcher Jorge Tavarez threw the fourth no-hitter in team history. This came on a 147 pitch effort in a 7–1 victory against their rival Sussex County Miners at Skylands Stadium. Tavarez also set a new franchise record with 142 strikeouts in a season. The Jackals set a franchise record with 127 home runs, led by outfielder Josh Rehwaldt who hit 29 home runs tying the franchise season record. Shortstop Santiago Chirino, became the new Frontier League leader with 140 career doubles and 440 runs scored. The club missed the playoffs for the second consecutive season finishing with a 45–49 record. The Jackals total attendance in 2022 was 51,333. Averaging 1,007 per game, the lowest in franchise history at Yogi Berra Stadium.

On September 14, 2022, the Jackals announced that they would move to the newly renovated and former Negro leagues ballpark, Hinchliffe Stadium in Paterson for the 2023 season, ending 25 years at Yogi Berra Stadium.

=== 2023: The Jackals' first year in Paterson ===
On November 7, 2022, P. J. Phillips was announced as manager. The Jackals made their Hinchliffe Stadium debut on May 21, where they defeated the Sussex County Miners 10–6. Phillips led the Jackals to a 60–35 regular season record, ending a two year playoff drought. In the playoffs, the Jackals defeated the Sussex County Miners in the East Division Wild Card Game 5–0. In the East Divisional Series, the Jackals would fall to the eventual champions Québec Capitales 2 games to 1. The Jackals total attendance in 2023 was 36,971. Averaging 725 per game, the lowest in franchise history.

=== 2024 ===
On October 16, 2023, John Hunt was named General Manager. On February 20, 2024, Albert Gonzalez was named manager. This season saw the Jackals miss the playoffs as the team finished in second-to-last place in the Frontier League East Division. Despite the team's on-the-field struggles, attendance improved significantly at Hinchliffe Stadium, with a total attendance of 81,528 for an average of 1,896 per game.

=== 2025 ===
The Jackals wound up doing worse in the 2025 season, falling to last place in the Frontier League East Division. Also, on the morning of August 8, 2025, there was a 30-inch water main break behind Hinchliffe Stadium, which caused the two home games vs. the Brockton Rox for that day and the next day to be postponed. Instead, water distribution took place at the stadium. It wasn't until a week later on August 16, 2025 that the Jackals were able to play again at Hinchliffe Stadium after the main break was fixed. On that day, the Jackals played a double header against Schaumburg Boomers. Game 1 was a 5-4 Jackals victory while Game 2 was a 7-4 Boomers victory.

=== 2026 ===
On November 18, 2025, Bobby Jones returned as the Jackals manager for his second stint with the team following the departure of Albert Gonzalez. The Jackals improved significantly and returned to the postseason for the first time in three years. They also clinched a division title for the first time since 2004. However, they were swept by the Ottawa Titans in the Wild Card round, in which they later went on to win their first league championship.

== Team identity ==
=== Rivalries ===
The Jackals developed strong rivalries with two teams out of geographical proximity and frequent playoff confrontations. The "Battle of the Hudson River" with the New York Boulders is so-called as the Jackals' stadiums in the New York metropolitan area were always less than 30 miles and across the Hudson River from Clover Stadium. Paterson's proximity with Augusta also led to a rivalry with the Sussex County Miners, the "Battle of New Jersey". The Jackals and the Miners are the only two Frontier League teams located in the state of New Jersey.

=== Mascot ===
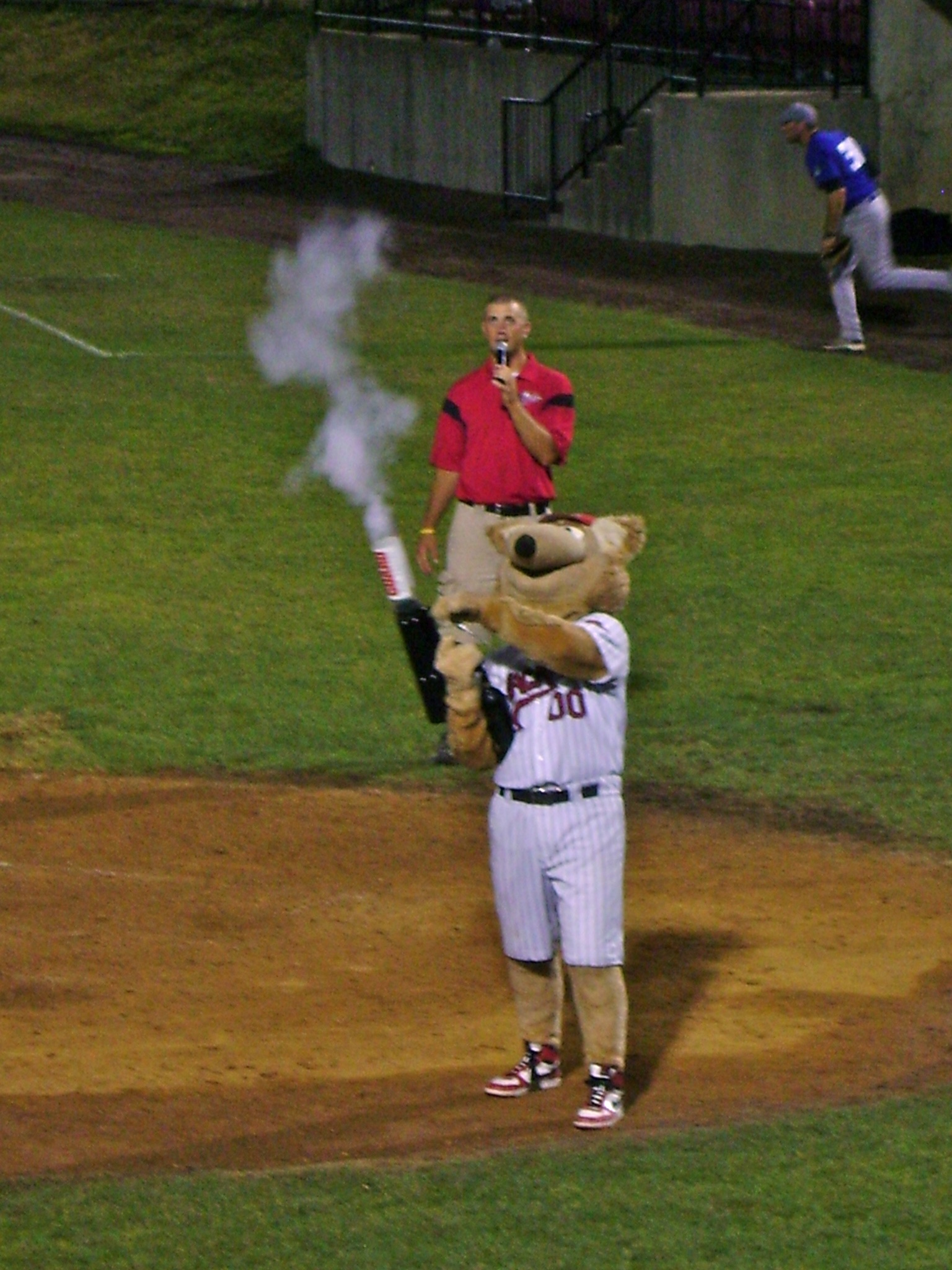
Jack the Jackal

The official mascot for the New Jersey Jackals is an anthropomorphic jackal named Jack. He entertains fans and autographs souvenirs during every home game. His trademark game antics include Tackle the Jackal, T-shirt toss, the Cha Cha Slide, the YMCA, etc. Jack is popular with children who attend the games, as well as the community.

=== Logos and uniforms ===
The official colors of the New Jersey Jackals are red and black. The primary logo incorporates several elements, including the initials "NJ" for New Jersey with the "Jackals" wordmark following the "J." A stylized baseball in white with red threading and black outline dots the "J", with a depiction of a jackal's head in red with white shadowing and black outline is centered above the wordmark.

The Jackals wear a black cap for home games and red for away. The road cap has the "NJ" cap logo centered on the front, with a baseball dotting the "J." The home cap is black with the "jackal" cap logo centered on the front with a baseball incorporated with the logo to the left. The home jerseys are white with black pinstripes with the "Jackals" wordmark centered across in red with black outline. The away jerseys are grey with the "New Jersey" wordmark arched across the front in red letters with black outline. An alternate jersey is black with red piping with the "Jackals" wordmark centered across in red with white outline. The batting practice jersey is red with black sleeves, with the "NJ" cap logo centered on the left-side chest.

== Current roster ==
New Jersey Jackals roster
Active roster		Coaching staff
Pitchers: -- Dustin Baird; -- Branden Blankenship; -- Gabriel Cotto; -- Larry De Jesus; -- Sonny Fauci; -- Frankie Giuliano; -- Nick Hohenstein; -- Andrew Imperatore; -- Jake Kuchmaner; -- Konsta Kurikka; -- Will Lopez; -- David Tiburcio; -- Nick Trabacchi; -- Andrew Vail; -- Colt Webb	Catchers: -- Jimmy Costin; -- Justin Jimenez; -- Chris Reeder; -- Sebastian Velez; Infielders: -- Luis Acevedo; -- Richel Del Rosario; -- Chase Maifield; -- Jankel Ortiz; -- Jorge Ortiz; -- Trevor Sheehan; -- Xavier Vargas; Outfielders: -- Javell Barnes; -- Ryan Chase; -- Bryan Miranda; -- Matthew Smith	Manager: 21 Bobby Jones; Coaches: 12 Joe Testa (pitching); 10 J.P. Vail (hitting); Disabled list; ‡ Inactive list; § Suspended list; updated May 2, 2025 Transactions

== Notable alumni ==
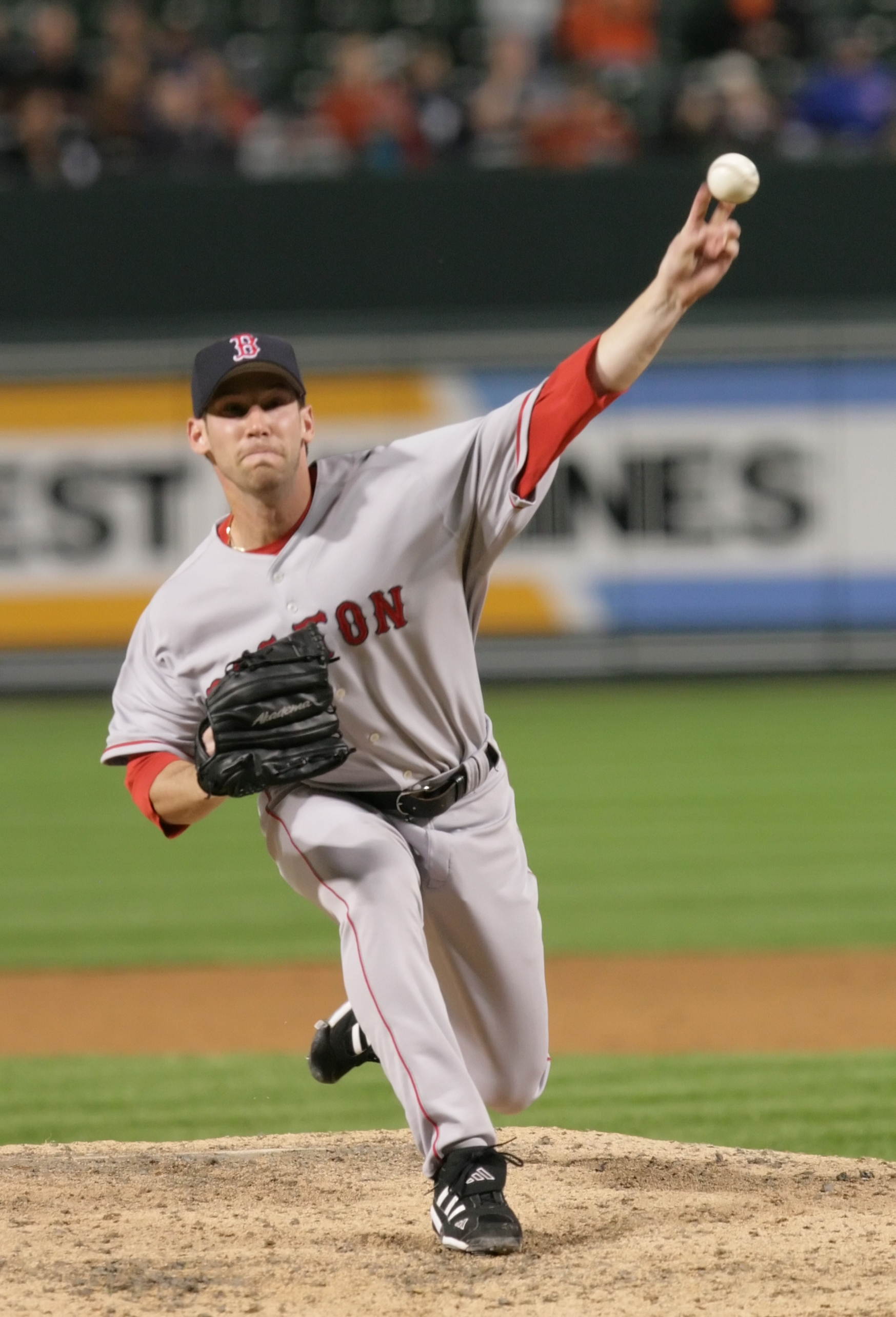
Craig Breslow

- Craig Breslow, former relief pitcher for the Boston Red Sox. Breslow joined the Jackals midway through the 2004 season and was signed by the San Diego Padres in 2005, making his major league debut later that season. Breslow has also pitched for the Arizona Diamondbacks, Cleveland Indians, Minnesota Twins, and Oakland Athletics.
- John Lindsey, former Los Angeles Dodgers first baseman. Lindsey played for the Jackals in 2005 and was bought by the Florida Marlins at midseason, only to be released at the end of the year. Lindsey returned to the Jackals in 2006, played the entire season, and joined the Dodgers in 2007. Lindsey made his major league debut in 2010 at 33 years old. Lindsey joined the Jackals for a third time in 2013 after being released from the Detroit Tigers, where he had been playing in their minor league system for the Toledo Mud Hens. As of 2015, Lindsey is playing in the Mexican League.
- Tim Adleman, pitcher 2016 Cincinnati Reds. Adleman pitched for the Jackals in 2013. That same year he was signed by the Cincinnati Reds. Three years later he made his major league debut for the Reds on May 1, 2016. He currently pitches in the Reds organization.
- Raúl Valdés, retired pitcher. Valdes pitched for the Jackals in 2006 and went 7–3 in 17 games with 12 starts. He signed a minor league contract with the New York Mets following the season and made his major league debut for them in 2010. Valdes signed with the St. Louis Cardinals in the 2010 offseason and began the 2011 season with the Memphis Redbirds, the Cardinals' Triple-A affiliate. He was released by St. Louis after making seven appearances and finished the 2011 season with the New York Yankees.
- Mark Lemke, former second baseman for the Atlanta Braves. After retiring from the major leagues in 1998, Lemke decided to attempt a comeback as a knuckleball pitcher and joined the Jackals for 1999. He was released early in the 2000 season due to control problems.
- Pete Rose Jr., son of Pete Rose and career minor leaguer. Rose, who played as "PJ Rose", spent two seasons with the Jackals from 1998 to 1999.
- Timo Perez, former major league outfielder. Perez played for the Jackals in 2009 for 21 games.
- Benji Gil, former major league infielder. Gil joined the Jackals as part of a comeback attempt in 2005 but was released.
- Argenis Reyes, former major league infielder. Reyes played for the New York Mets from 2008 to 2009, joined the Jackals in 2010, and was sold by the team to the Boston Red Sox in July 2011. The Red Sox promptly traded him to Cleveland, where he joined the Columbus Clippers and led them to the International League championship.
- D'Angelo Jiménez, former major league second baseman. Jiménez joined the Jackals in the second half of the 2011 season after spending the previous season split between the Rochester Red Wings and the Mexican League.
- Stuart Pomeranz, retired former pitcher for the Baltimore Orioles. Pomeranz pitched for the Jackals in 2009 and was bought following the season by the Colorado Rockies.
- Ángel Berroa, former major league infielder who won the 2003 American League Rookie of the Year award with the Kansas City Royals. Berroa joined the Jackals in 2012 after spending the previous season split between the Reno Aces of the Pacific Coast League and the Bridgeport Bluefish of the Atlantic League.
- Matt Chico, former Washington Nationals pitcher. Chico, who has had major elbow surgery in the past, spent 2011 pitching for the Nationals' Gulf Coast League team, the Harrisburg Senators, and the Syracuse SkyChiefs before signing with the Jackals in 2012.
- Ryan Adams, former major league infielder who played one season for the Baltimore Orioles in 2011. Signed with the Los Angeles Dodgers for the 2014 season but joined the Jackals for 11 games after being suspended 100 games for performance enhancing substances.
- Anthony Claggett, former pitcher who split one major league season between the Pittsburgh Pirates and New York Yankees in 2009. Signed with the Jackals in 2015 and pitched in 11 games.
- Donnie Joseph, former major league pitcher who played for the Kansas City Royals in 2013 and 2014. Recorded a 5.49 ERA in 35 appearances for the Jackals in 2015.
- Robert Stock, pitcher presently on the Syracuse Mets AAA roster. Robert made his MLB debut with the San Diego Padres on June 24, 2018, appearing in 32 games that season and 10 games in 2019. As a Jackal pitcher in 2016, Stock appeared in 52 games setting a league record.
- Johnny Hellweg, pitcher currently with the Long Island Ducks of the Atlantic League of Professional Baseball. Spent the latter half of the 2016 season with the team after being released by the San Diego Padres organization and began the 2017 season with the team before signing with the Pittsburgh Pirates.
- José Cisnero, pitcher currently in the major leagues with the Detroit Tigers. Pitched with the team for 5 games in 2016 after being released by the Sultanes de Monterrey of the Mexican League.
- Vic Black, former pitcher for the New York Mets and Pittsburgh Pirates in 2013 and 2014. Played for the team in the 2018 season, appearing in 15 games and posting a 4.37 ERA.
- Carlos Triunfel, former infielder for the Seattle Mariners and Los Angeles Dodgers from 2012 to 2014. Played in 100 games with the Jackals in the 2018 season.
- Dean Green, infielder who played one year in Nippon Professional Baseball (NPB) with the Tokyo Yakult Swallows. Spent part of the 2018 season with the Jackals.
- Lendy Castillo, pitcher who played in 13 games for the Chicago Cubs in 2012. Signed with the Jackals in 2018 before joining the Generales de Durango of the Mexican League and also spent the 2019 season with the team.
- Mat Latos, 9-year major league veteran pitcher currently with the Southern Maryland Blue Crabs of the Atlantic League of Professional Baseball. Spent the 2018 season with the team and signed to play for the Jackals in 2020 before the season was cancelled due to the COVID-19 pandemic.
- Vin Mazzaro, 8-year major league veteran pitcher currently with the Long Island Ducks of the Atlantic League of Professional Baseball. Spent the 2018 season with the team and posted a 1.76 ERA in 34 appearances.
- Alfredo Marte, former major league outfielder who played with the Arizona Diamondbacks and Los Angeles Angels of Anaheim from 2013 to 2015. Signed with the Jackals prior to the 2019 season and also played with the team during the 2021 and 2022 seasons.
- Ronald Herrera, former major league pitcher who played with the New York Yankees in 2017. Signed with the Jackals for the 2021 season where he posted a 4.68 ERA with 23 strikeouts in 6 appearances.
- José Ramírez, former major league pitcher who played with the New York Yankees, Seattle Mariners, and Atlanta Braves from 2014 to 2018. Signed with the Jackals for the 2022 season.
- Phillip Ervin, former major league outfielder with the Cincinnati Reds and Seattle Mariners from 2017-2020. Signed with the Jackals for the 2023 season where he batted .318/.438/.517 with 8 home runs and 38 RBI.
- Keon Barnum, former 1st-round pick for the Chicago White Sox. Signed with Jackals for the 2023 season where he batted .316/.428/.635 with 30 home runs and 87 RBI.
- Roniel Raudes, pitcher who spent time in the Boston Red Sox organization. Signed with the Jackals for the 2024 season where he posted a 9.00 ERA with 5 strikeouts in 5 appearances.
- Miguel Gómez, former major league infielder with the San Francisco Giants from 2017 to 2018. Signed with the Jackals for the 2024 season.
- Robb Paller, outfielder who played for the Israel national baseball team. Signed with Jackals for the 2024 season.

== Contracts sold to MLB organizations ==
Player	Pos	MLB club	Year
Andrés Santiago	RHP	Atlanta	2017
Robert Stock	RHP	Cincinnati	2017
Art Charles	1B	Cincinnati	2016
Johnny Hellweg	RHP	Cincinnati	2016
Whit Mayberry	RHP	Washington	2016
Alex Powers	RHP	Cincinnati	2016
Johnny Walter	RHP	St. Louis	2016
Dwight Childs	C	Pittsburgh	2015
Peter Mooney	SS	Miami	2015
Gabriel Perez	RHP	Arizona	2014
Nick Giarraputo	INF	Chicago White Sox	2013
Zach Woods	RHP	New York Yankees	2012
Dustin Cameron	RHP	Philadelphia	2011
Leonard Davis	OF	Washington	2011
James Leverton	LHP	Miami	2011
Argenis Reyes	INF	Cleveland	2011
Chris Garcia	INF	Atlanta	2010
Myron Leslie	INF	New York Yankees	2010
Jordan Newton	C	Pittsburgh	2010
Stu Pomeranz	RHP	Colorado	2010
Argenis Reyes	INF	Boston	2010
Chris Garcia	INF	Pittsburgh	2009
Chris Maddox	C	Atlanta	2009
Tom Atlee	RHP	Milwaukee	2008
Sandy Madera	C	Boston	2008
Hunter Davis	RHP	Tampa Bay	2007
Alex Fernandez	OF	Pittsburgh	2007
John Lindsey	1B	Los Angeles Dodgers	2007
Rusty Tucker	LHP	Milwaukee	2007
Mike Vicaro	RHP	Colorado	2007
Jason Wylie	RHP	Philadelphia	2007
Sandy Madera	C	Baltimore	2006
Isaac Pavlik	LHP	Chicago Cubs	2006
Randy Rapp	RHP	Oakland	2006
Raúl Valdés	LHP	New York Mets	2006
John Lindsey	1B	Miami	2005

== Season records ==
New Jersey Jackals 1998–2023
Season	League	Manager	First half record	Second half record	Season record
1998	Northeast League	Kash Beauchamp	30–12, 1st place South	23–19, 2nd place South	53–31
1999	Northern League	Kash Beauchamp	23–19, 1st place South	22–21, 2nd place South (tie)	45–40
2000	Northern League	Kash Beauchamp	17–25, 4th place South	14–27, 4th place South	31–52
2001	Northern League	George Tsamis	20–25, 3rd place South	25–20, 2nd place South	45–45
2002	Northern League	George Tsamis	30–15, 1st place South	32–12, 1st place South	62–27
2003	Northeast League	Joe Calfapietra	28–17, 1st place South	24–20, 1st place South	52–37
2004	Northeast League	Joe Calfapietra	26–21, 1st place South	28–18, 1st place South	54–39
2005	Can-Am League	Joe Calfapietra	25–21, 2nd place South	23–23, 3rd place South	48–44
2006	Can-Am League	Joe Calfapietra	25–20, 2nd place (tie)	18–28, 7th place	43–48
2007	Can-Am League	Joe Calfapietra	31–15, 1st place	18–29, 10th place	49–34
2008	Can-Am League	Joe Calfapietra	25–22, 4th place	18–29, 8th place	43–41
2009	Can-Am League	Joe Calfapietra	28–19, 1st place	27–20, 3rd place	55–39
2010	Can-Am League	Joe Calfapietra	19–27, 5th place	23–23, 4th place	42–50
2011	Can-Am League	Joe Calfapietra	27–20, 2nd place	30–16, 1st place	57–36
2012	Can-Am League	Joe Calfapietra	No halves	No halves	59–41
2013	Can-Am League	Joe Calfapietra	No halves	No halves	55–44
2014	Can-Am League	Joe Calfapietra	No halves	No halves	55–41
2015	Can-Am League	Joe Calfapietra	No halves	No halves	54–43
2016	Can-Am League	Joe Calfapietra	No halves	No halves	62–38
2017	Can-Am League	Matt Padgett	No halves	No halves	55–45
2018	Can-Am League	Brooks Carey	No halves	No halves	50–52
2019	Can-Am League	Brooks Carey	No halves	No halves	48–46
2020	All-American Baseball Challenge	Jimmy Efre	No halves	No halves	12–10
2021	Frontier League	Brooks Carey	No halves	No halves	39–56
2022	Frontier League	Brooks Carey	No halves	No halves	45–49
2023	Frontier League	P. J. Phillips	No halves	No halves	60–35
2024	Frontier League	Albert Gonzalez	No halves	No halves	35–61
2025	Frontier League	Albert Gonzalez	No halves	No halves	28–65
2026	Frontier League	Bobby Jones	No halves	No halves	56–46

== All-time team records ==
Players in italics are still active.

=== Individual batting ===
- Average, career: Sandy Madera/Aaron Fera, .355
- Average, season: James Nelson, .388 (2023)
- Games played, career: Zach Smithlin, 472
- Games played, season: Carlos Truinfel, 100 (2018)
- Hits, career: Zach Smithlin, 503
- Hits, season: James Nelson, 141 (2023)
- Hits, game: Billy Brown, 6 (August 14, 2002); Art Charles, 6* (June 6, 2016, vs. Sussex)
- At Bats, game: Marcus Sanders, 10* (June 26, 2008)
- Home runs, career: Josh Rehwaldt, 69
- Home runs, season: Keon Barnum, 30 (2023) James Nelson, 30 (2023)
- Runs batted in, career: Alfredo Marte, 289
- Runs batted in, season: Art Charles, 101 (2016)
- Runs scored, career: Zach Smithlin, 287
- Runs scored, season: James Nelson, 111# (2023)
- Doubles, career: Alfredo Marte, 86
- Doubles, season: Chas Terni, 34 (2002)
- Triples, career: D' Vontrey Richardson, 16
- Triples, season: D'Vontrey Richardson, 12* (2016)
- Walks, career: Zach Smithlin, 220
- Walks, season: Conrad Gregor, 82 (2019)
- Total Bases, career: Alfredo Marte, 636
- Total Bases, season: James Nelson, 259 (2023)
- Extra-Base Hits, season: Art Charles, 60 (2016)
- Extra-Base Hits, career : Alfredo Marte, 149
- Stolen bases, career: Zach Smithlin, 154
- Stolen bases, season: Conrad Gregor, 49 (2019)
- Sacrifice flys, career: Santiago Chirino, 17
- Hit by pitch, career: Rylan Sandoval, 35
- Hit by pitch, season: Rylan Sandoval, 20 (2017)
- Longest hitting streak: Carmine Cappuccio, 39 games (1999)
- Longest Team Winning Streak: 14* (6/11/09 & 6/25/98)

Frontier League records#

Can-Am League records*

=== Individual pitching ===
- Appearances, career: Isaac Pavlik, 248*
- Appearances, season: Robert Stock, 52 (2016)
- Starts, career: Isaac Pavlik, 197*
- Starts, season: Aaron Myers, 20 (2002); Joe Orloski, 20 (2005); Isaac Pavlik, 20 (2008)
- Wins, career: Isaac Pavlik, 100*
- Wins, season: Joel Bennett, 14 (2002)
- Losses, career: Isaac Pavlik, 56*
- Saves, career: Rusty Tucker, 59
- Saves, season: Salvador Sanchez, 25 (2014)
- Innings pitched, career: Isaac Pavlik, 1305-1/3*
- Innings pitched, season: Joe Orloski, 140-1/3 (2005)
- Strikeouts, career: Isaac Pavlik, 1019*
- Strikeouts, season: Joel Bennett, 141 (2002)
- Strikeouts, game: Joel Bennett, 16 (June 23, 2002)
- Bases on balls, career: Isaac Pavlik, 301*
- Complete games, career: Isaac Pavlik, 18
- Complete games, season: Kevin Pincavitch, 7 (2000); Aaron Myers, 7 (2002)
- Earned run average, career: Jason Dietrich, 1.45 31IP
- Shutouts, career: Aaron Myers, 7
- Shutouts, season: Paul Magrini, 2 (1998); Joel Bennett, 2 (2001); Aaron Myers, 2 (2002 & 2006); Isaac Pavlik, 2 (2010); Johnny Walter, 2 (2015)
- Losses, season: Joe Orloski and Aaron Myers, 9 (2006); Jackson Crowther, 9 (2004)
- Bases on balls, season: Andres Caceres, 86 (2017)
- No-hitters pitched: Jeremy Callier, (August 28, 2002); Aaron Myers, (August 6, 2006); Eduar Lopez, (August 7, 2018)

Can-Am League records*

=== Team records ===
Team batting

Highest Batting Average, season .297 (2023)

Most hits, season 1012* (2012)

Most runs scored, season 700# (2023)

Most doubles, season 190 (2016)

Most triples, season 46* (2016)

Most Home runs, season 195# (2023)

Most extra base hits, season 349 (2023)

Most RBI's, season 655# (2023)

Most Total Bases, season 1704# (2023)

Most BB’s, season 501# (2023)

Team pitching-

Most strikeouts, season 866* (2017)

Most shutouts, season 13 tie (2011)

Frontier League records#

Can-Am League records*

Statistics are as of the end of the 2023 season.

== Postseason records ==
The Jackals have participated in 119 games in 30 postseason series. They have an overall playoff record of 62 wins and 57 losses.

Postseason Records
Year	Opening round	League championship	Northern League championship
1998	Defeated Allentown Ambassadors, 2 games to 0	Def. Albany-Colonie Diamond Dogs, 2 games to 0	
1999	Defeated Allentown Ambassadors, 3 games to 0	Lost to Albany-Colonie Diamond Dogs, 3 games to 1	
2001	Defeated Albany-Colonie Diamond Dogs, 3 games to 0	Def. Elmira Pioneers, 3 games to 2	Def. Winnipeg Goldeyes, 3 games to 1
2002	Defeated Elmira Pioneers, 3 games to 2	Def. Adirondack Lumberjacks, 3 games to 2	Def. Winnipeg Goldeyes, 3 games to 1
2003	Lost to Brockton Rox, 3 games to 1		
2004	Defeated Bangor Lumberjacks, 3 games to 1	Def. North Shore Spirit, 3 games to 2	
2007	Lost to Nashua Pride, 3 games to 2		
2009	Lost to Worcester Tornadoes, 3 games to 0		
2010	Lost to Québec Capitales, 3 games to 0		
2011	Defeated Pittsfield Colonials, 3 games to 0	Lost to Québec Capitales, 3 games to 1	
2012		Lost to Québec Capitales, 4 games to 3	
2013		Lost to Québec Capitales, 4 games to 1	
2014		Lost to Rockland Boulders, 4 games to 2	
2015	Defeated Québec Capitales, 3 games to 2	Lost to Trois-Rivières Aigles, 3 games to 2	
2016	Lost to Ottawa Champions, 3 games to 1		
2017	Lost to Rockland Boulders, 3 games to 1		
2019	Defeated Trois-Rivières Aigles, 3 games to 2	Defeated Sussex County Miners, 3 games to 1	
2020	Defeated Rockland Boulders, 11–2	Defeated New York Brave, 3–2	
2023	Lost to Québec Capitales, 2 games to 1		
2026	Lost to Ottawa Titans, 2 games to 0		

== Broadcast homes ==
Jackals games are broadcast via video stream at Flosports.tv and an internet-only audio broadcast at Mixlr.

When the Jackals began in 1998, games were carried over Seton Hall University's WSOU. After a season there, the team moved to commercial station WMTR, an oldies station in Morristown. They also were heard on WJUX-FM, a New York-based standards station, ending their run on commercial radio in 2002. For this entire stretch, Jim Cerny was the voice of the Jackals. Kevin Burkhardt was also one of the Jackals play-by-play voices.

WPSC-FM, the on-campus radio station for William Paterson University, took broadcast rights in 2003 and kept them until 2006. The original broadcast team consisted of Darren Cooper on play-by-play with Joe Ameruoso as color commentator. Cooper left the broadcast after the season, and Tony Colucci was added as color man to take over for the promoted Ameruoso. Beginning in 2005, Ameruoso did the broadcasts by himself and continued to do so after the broadcasts became web exclusive in 2007, continuing in the role for several more years until his eventual departure.

Other broadcasters in team history include Cody Chrusciel in 2011, Corey Scheiner and Mia O'Brien in 2012. Michael Cohen broadcast games from 2013-2016. Alex Cammarata from 2017-19. Starting in the 2020 season, Reed Keller took the reins until 2023. In 2024, Matt Sosler was named the next voice of the franchise.

== Career pitching leaders ==
Seasons played
Player	Statistic
Isaac Pavlik*	13
Joel Bennett	7
Aaron Myers	5
Kevin Pincavitch	4
Mike Vicaro	4
Paul Magrini	3
Josh Brey*	3
Fernando Cruz	3
A.J. Wideman*	3
Shaun Ellis	3
Andy High*	3
Rusty Tucker*	3
Evan DeLuca*	3
Ryan Fennell	3
Josh Brinkley	3

Games started
Player	Statistic
Isaac Pavlik*	197
Joel Bennett	100
Aaron Myers	83
Kevin Pincavitch	46
Josh Brey*	44
Paul Magrini	43
A.J. Wideman*	39
Lee Sosa	37
Jackson Crowther	37
Joe Orloski	36

Wins
Player	Statistic
Isaac Pavlik*	100
Joel Bennett	59
Aaron Myers	37
Kevin Pincavitch	23
A.J. Wideman*	21
Mike Bertotti*	19
Lee Sosa	18
Paul Magrini	17
Mike Vicaro	16
Gabe Perez	16

Innings pitched
Player	Statistic
Isaac Pavlik*	1305 1/3
Joel Bennett	660
Aaron Myers	543
Kevin Pincavitch	334 1/3
Joe Orloski	264
Paul Magrini	255
Lee Sosa	235 2/3
Josh Brey*	234 2/3
A.J. Wideman*	234 1/3
Jackson Crowther	228 1/3

Strikeouts
Player	Statistic
Isaac Pavlik*	1019
Joel Bennett	632
Aaron Myers	418
Kevin Pincavitch	279
Mike Bertotti*	196
Stephen Fox	192
Lee Sosa	191
Paul Magrini	185
Mike Vicaro	178
Jackson Crowther	172

Complete games
Player	Statistic
Isaac Pavlik*	18
Joel Bennett	15
Aaron Myers	13
Kevin Pincavitch	11
Paul Magrini	8
Steve Fish	6
Mike Bertotti*	5
Josh Brey*	4
Jackson Crowther	4
Joe Orloski	4
John DeSilva	4

Saves
Player	Statistic
Rusty Tucker*	59
Keith Cantwell	33
Mike Hartung	29
Salvador Sanchez	25
Fabricio Benitez	21
Hector Nelo	21
Johnny Hellweg	20
Romas Hicks	19
Jeff Gogal*	18
Fernando Cruz	12

== Retired jerseys ==
The Jackals have retired the following five numbers:

- 8 for Yogi Berra, the former New York Yankees Hall of Fame catcher and resident of Montclair, New Jersey for whom the Jackals' former home stadium was named. The Jackals have never issued the number.
- 28 for pitcher Joel Bennett. He joined the Jackals in 2001 and pitched for the team until 2007, recording 59 wins as a starter, and was a member of the 2001, 2002, and 2004 league champion teams. Retired in 2008.
- 4 for outfielder/second baseman Zach Smithlin. He played for the Jackals from 2004 until 2009 and is the team’s all time leader in hits, games played, runs scored, walks and stolen bases. Retired in 2011.
- 14 for Ed Ott, former MLB catcher and Jackals pitching coach. Ott served as Joe Calfapietra's pitching coach for two separate stints, first from 2007 through 2009 and the second between 2011 and 2014.
- 7 for pitcher Isaac Pavlik. Joining the Jackals in 2005, he pitched with them until 2017, recording 100 total victories and setting many of the team's pitching records. Retired in 2019.

== Anniversary teams ==
5th Anniversary Team
Position	Player
First base	D.C. Olsen (1998–1999)
Second base	Essex Burton (1999)
Third base	Ryan Kane (2001–2002)
Shortstop	Saul Bustos (1998)
Catcher	Mike Church (2001)
Designated hitter	David Kennedy (2001–2002)
Outfielders	Trey Beamon (2001)
Outfielders	Carmine Cappuccio (1999)
Outfielders	Pete Rose Jr. (1998–1999)
Starting pitchers	Joel Bennett (2001–2002)
Starting pitchers	Mike Bertotti (2001–2002)
Starting pitchers	Steve Fish (2001–2002)
Starting pitchers	Paul Magrini (1998–2000)
Starting pitchers	Kevin Pincavitch (1998–2001)
Relief pitchers	Jon Hand (2001)
Relief pitchers	Mike Hartung (1998–1999)
Relief pitchers	Andy High (1998–2000)
Relief pitchers	Todd Meady (2001–2002)
Relief pitchers	Matt Wagner (2001)

10th Anniversary Team
Position	First Team Players	Second Team Players
First base	D.C. Olsen (1998–1999)	Dave Callahan (2002)
Second base	Craig Conway (2001–2005)	Essex Burton (1999)
Third base	Ryan Kane (2001–2002)	Wilton Veras (2004)
Shortstop	Chas Terni (2001–2002)	Chris Rowan (2003–2005)
Catcher	Mike Church (2001)	Josh Brinkley (1998–2000)
Designated hitter	David Kennedy (2001–2002)	John Lindsey (2005–2006)
Outfielders	Travis Bailey (2002–2003)	Aaron Fera (2001)
Outfielders	Carmine Cappuccio (1999)	Trey Beamon (2001)
Outfielders	Zack Smithlin (2004–2007)	Billy Rich (2002)
Starting pitchers	Joel Bennett (2001–2007)	Jackson Crowther (2003–2004)
Starting pitchers	Mike Bertotti (2001–2002)	Josh Brey (2005–2007)
Starting pitchers	Steve Fish (2001–2002)	Trevor Marcotte (2003–2004)
Starting pitchers	Aaron Myers (2002–2006)	Paul Magrini (1998–2000)
Starting pitchers	Kevin Pincavitch (1998–2001)	Isaac Pavlik (2005–2007)
Relief pitchers	Mike Hartung (1998–1999)	Ryan Halla (2002)
Relief pitchers	Ben Grezlovski (2003–2004)	Scott Allan (2001–2002)
Relief pitchers	Matt Wagner (2001)	Jon Hand (2001)
Relief pitchers	Andy High (1998–2000)	Todd Meady (2001–2002)
Relief pitchers	Julio Perez (2003, 2005)	Fabricio Benitez (2004–2005)
Utility	Kevin Grijak (2003–2004)	John Anderson (2003–2004)
Manager	George Tsamis (2001–2002)	Joe Calfapietra (2003–2007)

Achievements
Preceded by Elmira Pioneers; 1997	Northeast League Champions; New Jersey Jackals; 1998	Succeeded by Brockton Rox; 2003
Preceded by Adirondack Lumberjacks; 2000	Northern League Champions; New Jersey Jackals; 2001–2002	Succeeded by Fargo-Moorhead RedHawks; 2003
Preceded by Brockton Rox; 2003	Northeast League Champions; New Jersey Jackals; 2004	Succeeded by Worcester Tornadoes; 2005 Can-Am
Preceded by Sussex County Miners; 2018	Can-Am League Champions; New Jersey Jackals; 2019	Succeeded by
