= Garland Buckeye =

American football and baseball player (1897–1975)

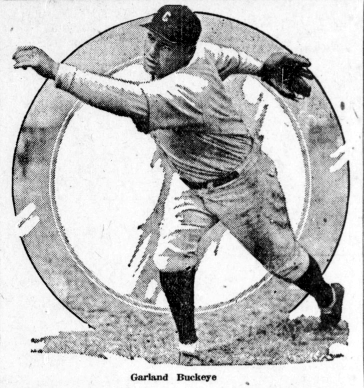
- Pitcher
- Born: October 16, 1897; Heron Lake, Minnesota, U.S.
- Died: November 14, 1975 (aged 78); Stone Lake, Wisconsin, U.S.
- Batted: Switch Threw: Left

MLB debut
- June 19, 1918, for the Washington Senators

Last MLB appearance
- July 12, 1928, for the New York Giants

MLB statistics
- Win–loss record: 30–39
- Earned run average: 3.91
- Strikeouts: 134
- Stats at Baseball Reference

Teams
- Washington Senators (1918); Cleveland Indians (1925–1928); New York Giants (1928)

Garland Buckeye
Profile
- Positions: Center, Guard

Personal information
- Born: October 16, 1897; Heron Lake, Minnesota
- Died: November 14, 1975 (aged 78); Stone Lake, Wisconsin
- Listed height: 6 ft 0 in (1.83 m)
- Listed weight: 238 lb (108 kg)

Career history
- Chicago Tigers (1920); Chicago Cardinals (1921–1925); Chicago Bulls (1926)
- Stats at Pro Football Reference

Garland Maiers "Gob" Buckeye (October 16, 1897 – November 14, 1975) was a professional football and baseball player. He debuted as a pitcher in the major leagues in 1918, was a professional football offensive lineman for several years in the early 1920s, and returned to professional baseball between 1925 and 1928.

== Baseball career ==
Buckeye made his major league debut on June 19, 1918, for the Washington Senators at the Polo Grounds against the Yankees. He pitched the last two innings of a 9–0 game, allowing three hits, six walks, and four earned runs while striking out two batters.

From 1925 to 1927, he had some success as the fifth starter for the Cleveland Indians. On June 11, 1927, he gave up two home runs to Babe Ruth in the same game. After a slow start in 1928, Buckeye was released and signed with the New York Giants. He pitched one game for them, giving up six runs in 3.2 innings.

Buckeye finished with a 30–39 record in 108 games pitched (67 starts). He had an earned run average of 3.91 and had one save. As a hitter, Buckeye posted a .230 batting average (47-for-204) with 19 runs, 5 home runs and 23 RBIs.

== Football career ==
Buckeye was a center and guard from 1920 to 1924 and 1926. In 1920, he played four games for the Chicago Tigers of the APFA. From 1921 to 1924, he played for the Chicago Cardinals of the APFA and NFL. In 1926 he played for the Chicago Bulls of the first American Football League.

== Later life ==
Buckeye ran the Rhinelander Brewing Company in Wisconsin, then operated a Ford dealership in Toledo, Ohio.

He enjoyed hunting and fishing, and raised and judged bird dogs.

In 1938, Buckeye was convicted of conspiracy to violate gambling laws. Along with seven other defendants, who were said to have attempted to form a slot machine ring, he was sentenced to six months in prison.

Buckeye died in 1975. At that time, he lived with his daughter, Marylee Pomeranz, in Richmond, Indiana, but died at his summer home in Stone Lake, Wisconsin.

Marylee's grandsons Drew and Stu Pomeranz became Major League Baseball pitchers.
