= Floyd Hall =

American business executive (born 1938)

Floyd Hall (born September 4, 1938) is an American business executive and sports team owner.

== Life and career ==
Hall was born in Oklahoma. He left school at the age of 15. He attended Southern Methodist University but did not graduate.

Hall started working at Montgomery Ward in August 1956. From 1970 to 1984, he was regional vice president at the Singer Company. He then worked for B. Dalton Booksellers where he was subsequently promoted to chief executive officer (CEO). He became chairman and CEO of Target Stores in 1981. James Goldsmith appointed Hall as partner and CEO of the Grand Union grocery chain, which he controlled, in February 1984. Goldsmith sold his shares in Grand Union's parent company Generale Occidentale to French conglomerate Compagnie Générale d'Electricité (CGE) in 1987, who sold the chain onto a management buyout led by Hall for $655 million in 1988. Grand Union was sold a year later, with Hall leaving and jointly setting up the museum reproduction company Museum Co..

Hall was appointed president and CEO of Kmart, which was struggling, in 1995.

Hall was the chief executive officer of Kmart from June 1995 – 2000. During Hall's term in office, the chain sold off several specialty businesses to focus on its core discount store business, remodeled the stores into the Big Kmart format, and acquired the Martha Stewart line of household products.

In 1997, Hall formed a partnership with the state of New Jersey and Montclair State University, Floyd Hall Enterprises, which supervised construction of the 4,000-seat Yogi Berra Stadium, home field for the New Jersey Jackals baseball team, and a two-rink ice arena, Floyd Hall Arena, both located on the campus of Montclair State University. Hall sold the Jackals to Al Dorso in 2017 and the ice arena back to Montclair State in a transaction finalized in early 2020; the university then renamed the building the Montclair State University Ice Arena.

In 2006, after the New Jersey Cardinals were relocated to Pennsylvania and became the State College Spikes, Hall started a second team to play in the Cardinals’ former home of Skylands Park in Augusta, New Jersey. The team, known as the Sussex Skyhawks, began play in 2006 and won the Canadian-American Association of Professional Baseball championship two years later. The team did not draw well and Hall folded the team after the 2010 season citing significant financial losses, the lack of an interested buyer, and the desire to focus on the Jackals and his other operations. (Oddly enough, current Jackals owner Al Dorso did the same thing that Hall did but in reverse; he started the Sussex County Miners, a replacement for the Skyhawks, and later purchased the Jackals.)

Hall was appointed by President George W. Bush to serve on the Amtrak Reform Board for a five-year term of office on January 4, 2006 via recess appointment. Hall was officially nominated to the position on February 10, 2006 and later confirmed by the Senate.

He is a resident of Montclair, New Jersey.

Hall completed Harvard Business School's advanced management program in 1977.
