= Stu Pomeranz =

American baseball player

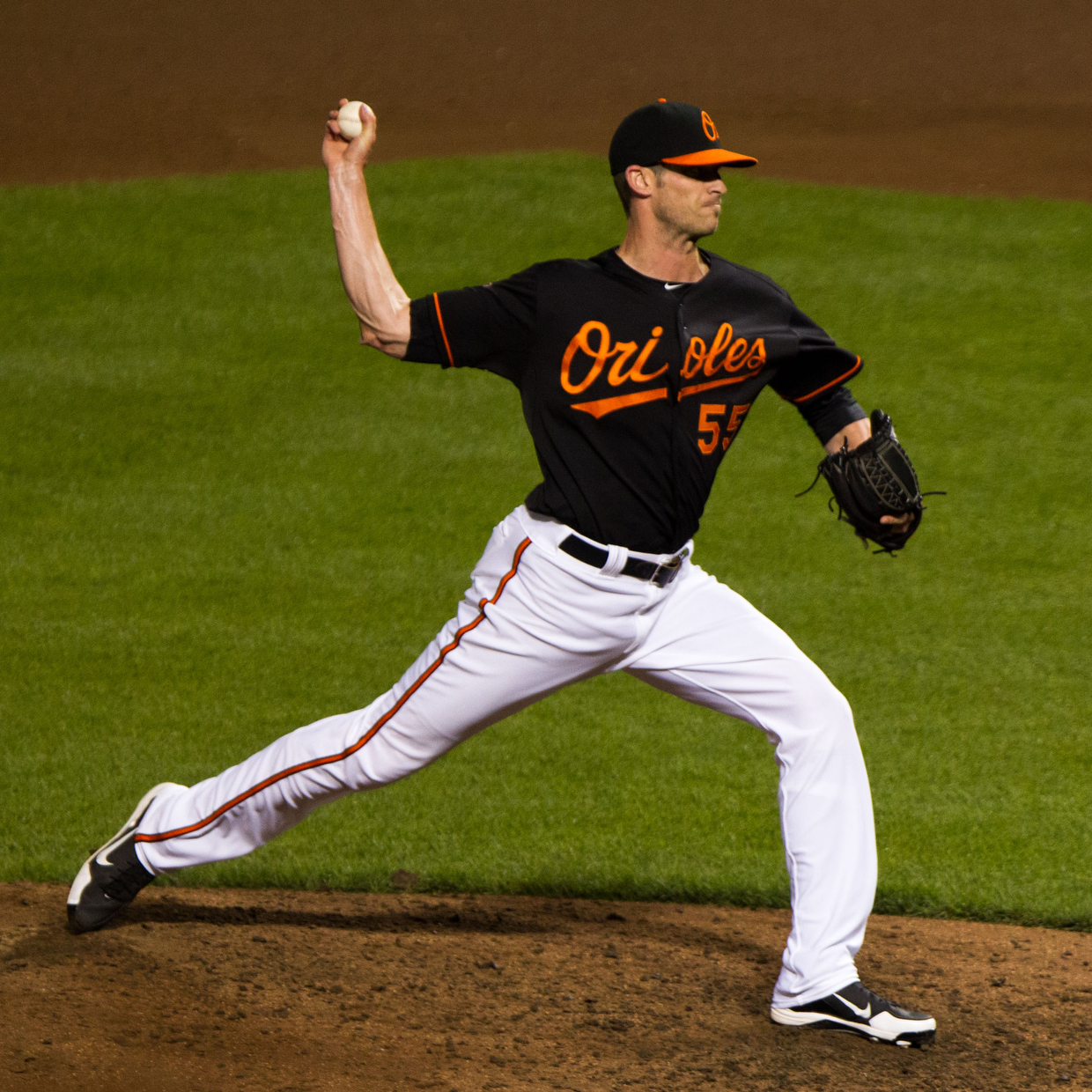
- Pomeranz with the Baltimore Orioles
- Pitcher
- Born: December 17, 1984 (age 41); Dallas, Texas
- Batted: Right Threw: Right

MLB debut
- May 7, 2012, for the Baltimore Orioles

Last MLB appearance
- May 25, 2012, for the Baltimore Orioles

MLB statistics
- Win–loss record: 0–0
- Earned run average: 3.00
- Strikeouts: 3
- Stats at Baseball Reference

Teams
- Baltimore Orioles (2012)

Stuart Michael Pomeranz (born December 17, 1984) is an American former professional baseball pitcher. He is the older brother of Los Angeles Angels pitcher Drew Pomeranz.

== Professional career ==
Pomeranz was drafted by the St. Louis Cardinals in the second round of the 2003 Major League Baseball draft out of Houston High School in Germantown, Tennessee.

Pomeranz made his professional debut with Rookie League Johnson City, where in 4 appearances, he was 1-1 with a 6.14 ERA. In his first full season, Pomeranz pitched with Single-A Peoria, where in 17 starts, he was 12-4 with a 3.55 ERA, striking out 88 in 101.1 innings. His 12 victories were the most in the Cardinals minor league system in 2004. Pomeranz began 2005 with High-A Palm Beach, where he pitched well in 8 starts before earning a promotion to Double-A Springfield, where he didn't pitch as well in 18 starts. Combined in 2005, he was 7-11 with a 4.65 ERA, striking out 95 in 147 innings.

Pomeranz made 18 more starts for Springfield in 2006, going 7-4 with a 4.39 ERA, striking out 64 in 98.1 innings. He was charged with a DUI in 2006. After the season, he pitched for the Peoria Saguaros in the Arizona Fall League where in 6 starts over 17 innings, he went 1-2, giving up 30 hits and 8 walks with a 9.00 ERA. In July 2007, Pomeranz underwent arthroscopic surgery on his injured shoulder, and he only made 6 starts that year between Palm Beach and the GCL Cardinals, going 1-2 with a 6.28 ERA. After the season, he played with the Mesa Solar Sox in the AFL, performing much better, going 2-0 in 5 starts with an 0.64 ERA. Pitching at extended spring training at the time, Pomeranz was released by the Cardinals on May 13, 2008.

On May 13, 2009, Pomeranz signed a minor league deal with the Chicago White Sox, but he was released 12 days later. Pomeranz pitched in independent ball in 2009 with the New Jersey Jackals of the Can-Am League. In 16 appearances (14 starts), he was 5-6 with a 6.50 ERA, striking out 48 in 73.1 innings.

On March 29, 2010, Pomeranz signed a minor league deal with the Colorado Rockies, and was assigned to Double-A Tulsa. Used as the closer and pitching out of the bullpen extensively for the first time in his professional career, he recorded 18 saves in 51 appearances, striking out 53 in 49 innings.

On December 6, 2010, Pomeranz signed a minor league deal with the Los Angeles Dodgers. He made 3 appearances during Spring Training. He only made two appearances in their system, with Double-A Chattanooga before he was released on June 8. Following his release, he underwent surgery on his elbow to remove bone chips.

After re-establishing himself with the Tiburones de La Guaira in the Venezuelan Professional Baseball League over the winter, going 4-0 with a 1.93 ERA in 18 appearances, Pomeranz went to tryouts at Camden Yards in January. On February 3, 2012, Pomeranz signed a minor league deal with the Baltimore Orioles. He made 8 appearances during Spring Training, giving up 1 run in 8.1 innings, and he was assigned to Double-A Bowie to begin the year. Pomeranz earned a promotion to Triple-A Norfolk, pitching 13.1 scoreless innings for the Baysox. He then pitched 5.2 scoreless innings with Norfolk before earning another promotion.

Pomeranz was called up to the majors for the first time on May 7, 2012. He made his major league debut that night, pitching 3 scoreless innings. That night, his brother, Drew, hit a home run with the Colorado Rockies. He made 2 more appearances with the Orioles before he was placed on the disabled list on May 28, 2012 with a left oblique strain. The strain was serious enough for the Orioles to move him to the 60-day disabled list on June 6.

On November 30, 2012, Pomeranz was designated for assignment, and the next day, it was announced he needed back surgery and would miss all of 2013. On January 8, 2013, the Orioles re-signed Pomeranz to a minor league deal.

As of 2014, the surgery was not successful and needed to be redone. As a result of the injury, Pomeranz has not pitched since 2012.

== Personal ==
His brother, Drew Pomeranz, also plays professional baseball. A great grandfather, Garland Buckeye, played both baseball and American football.
