= All-American Baseball Challenge =

Baseball league

The All-American Baseball Challenge was a six-team recreational baseball league formed in July 2020 in the New York City metropolitan area. Local ownership quickly organized this pop-up league in response to the cancellation of the 2020 Frontier League season, which was to feature three of the teams involved, due to the COVID-19 pandemic.

Games were played at Yogi Berra Stadium in Little Falls, New Jersey, Skylands Stadium in Augusta, New Jersey, and Palisades Credit Union Park in Pomona, New York. Each stadium featured two teams, which included the New Jersey Jackals and Sussex County Miners each playing in their home parks. The owners of the New York Boulders also fielded a team in their stadium, but the team kept the franchise’s former name of Rockland Boulders for the season.

Major leaguers Vin Mazzaro and Taylor Motter played in the league.

== Teams ==
AABC Team	Manager	Home stadium
New Jersey Jackals	Jimmy Efre	Yogi Berra Stadium
Jersey Wise Guys	Scott Iselhart	Yogi Berra Stadium
Rockland Boulders	Albert Gonzalez	Palisades Credit Union Park
New York Brave	Andrew Romanella	Palisades Credit Union Park
Sussex County Miners	Simon Walters	Skylands Stadium
Skylands Cardinals	Vladimir Fontalvo, Jr.	Skylands Stadium

The league featured players from independent, affiliated minor league, and college baseball.

== Rules ==
Initially, a 32 game, 8-week regular season was reported, but as games not played due to inclement weather were canceled, teams wound up playing fewer games. All games were scheduled were played on Thursday, Friday, Saturday, and Sunday. The Sunday games were 7 innings due to shortage of pitching. Each game had a 2.5 hour time limit in which no inning could begin 2 1/2 hours after 1st pitch. Music was played throughout the games.

New York Boulders founder and owner Shawn is credited with creating the League in conjunction with Greg Lockard in New Jersey and Michael Dorso in Sussex County.

Contests tied after 9 innings (7 on Sunday) used a home run derby to decide the winning team. A player on each team took five batting practice swings and the player with more home runs won the game for his team.

GameChanger was the official scoring/statistical tracking platform for the league.

== Season results ==
Final Regular Season Standings	Wins	Losses	%	gb
Sussex County Miners	16	6	0.727	-
Rockland Boulders	14	9	0.609	2 1/2
New Jersey Jackals	12	10	0.545	4
New York Brave	11	13	0.458	6
Jersey Wise Guys	10	13	0.435	6 1/2
Skylands Cardinals	6	18	0.250	11

=== Playoffs ===
Round 1 September 11, 2020

Skylands Stadium
(4) New York Brave 5
(1) Sussex County Miners 1

Palisades Credit Union Park
(3) New Jersey Jackals 11
(2) Rockland Boulders 2

Yogi Berra Stadium
(6) Skylands Cardinals 0
(5) Jersey Wise Guys 3

Round 2 September 12, 2020

Championship game
Yogi Berra Stadium
(4) New York Brave 2
(3) New Jersey Jackals 3

3rd place game
Skylands Stadium
(5) Jersey Wise Guys 1
(1) Sussex County Miners 5

5th place game
Palisades Credit Union Park
(6) Skylands Cardinals 7
(2) Rockland Boulders 6
