= Yogi Berra Stadium =

Baseball stadium at Montclair State University, NJ, US

Coordinates: 40.868734°N 74.195247°W

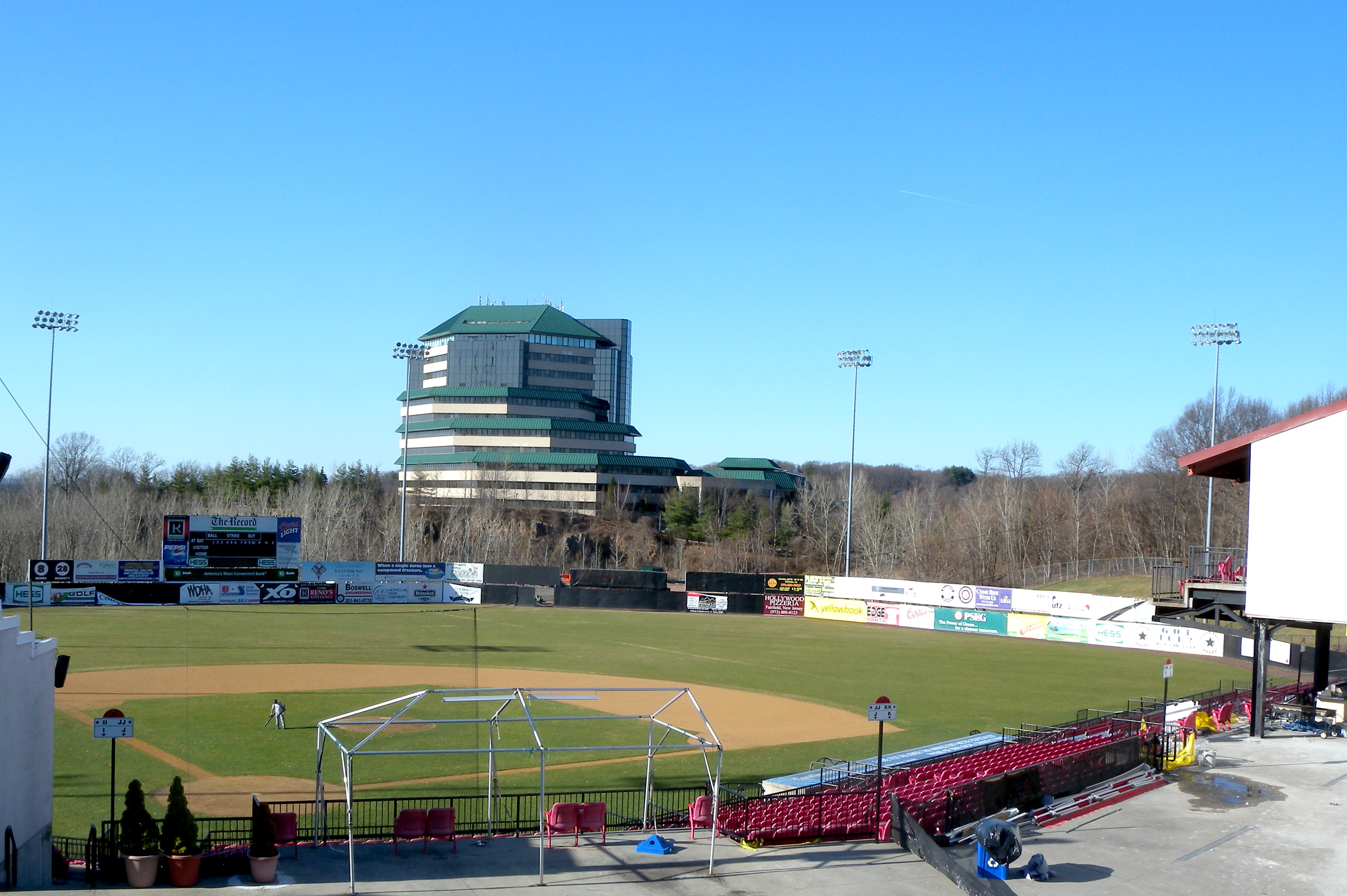
- View of the stadium in 2010

- Location within New Jersey Location within the United States
- Interactive map of Yogi Berra Stadium
- Address: 8 Yogi Berra Drive; Little Falls, NJ 07424
- Owner: Montclair State University
- Capacity: 3,784 (5,000 with lawn seating)
- Type: Ballpark
- Surface: Artificial turf
- Field size: Left Field: 308 ft Center Field: 398 ft Right Field: 308 ft
- Current use: Baseball

Construction
- Built: 1998
- Opened: May 1998
- Renovated: 2023–2024
- Architects: Terry H. Parker, AIA; Parker Associates

Tenants
- Montclair State Red Hawks (NCAA, NJAC); 1998–present NJIT Highlanders (NCAA, AEC); 2023–present New Jersey Jackals (FL) 1998–2022; New Jersey Pride (MLL) 2001; NY/NJ Comets (NPF) 2013 (part-time); Jersey Wise Guys (AABC) 2020

Website
- montclairathletics.com/yogi-berra-stadium

Yogi Berra Stadium is a baseball stadium in Little Falls, New Jersey, on the campus of Montclair State University. The stadium is home to the Montclair State Red Hawks baseball team, which competes in NCAA Division III; the NJIT Highlanders baseball team which competes in NCAA Division I; and the Yogi Berra Museum and Learning Center, which adjoins the stadium on its first base side. It was formerly home to the New Jersey Jackals of the independent Frontier League from 1998 to 2022 and the part-time home of the NY/NJ Comets of National Pro Fastpitch in 2013. In 2001, the stadium was the home field of the New Jersey Pride of Major League Lacrosse in their inaugural season.

== History ==
Yogi Berra Stadium has a seating capacity of 3,784 and a lawn seating that holds over 1,200 people, bringing the total capacity to 5,000. It is capable of holding overflow crowds with standing room and grass seating available in right field. These tickets are sold only in the event of an anticipated large crowd, such as on holidays or fireworks nights.

Construction of the stadium was done in conjunction with another venue on the Montclair State campus. Floyd Hall, a resident of Montclair who was then chief executive officer of Kmart, donated money to the university in order to build an ice arena, which is known as Floyd Hall Arena and is a multi-use facility that several of the area's high school hockey teams call home, and a new baseball stadium for Montclair State's team to replace their previous venue, Pittser Field. Around this time the Northeast League, an independent minor baseball league, was looking for a team to replace the Bangor Blue Ox, which had folded. Hall bought into the league shortly thereafter and founded the Jackals, who were promptly given use of the new stadium once it was able to open. It was decided to name the stadium after Hall of Fame New York Yankees catcher Yogi Berra, who called Montclair home during his playing days and managerial career with the Yankees and their crosstown rivals, the New York Mets.

Despite construction delays keeping the Montclair State baseball team from using the new park (they remained at Pittser Field for one additional season; Pittser Field was then converted into a soccer only stadium), it opened for business in time for the Jackals' inaugural game on June 5, 1998. Despite the stadium only being partially finished, as construction on an addition continued throughout the season, fans hungry for economical entertainment flocked to the ball park for a fun night out, and the park is well-constructed with good sight lines and no obstructed views from any of its seats. The park's dimensions are 308 feet to each of the corner outfields and 398 to center field; according to the Jackals, this was done on purpose as another honor for Berra.

An addition was constructed to house the Yogi Berra Museum and Learning Center, which features various baseball memorabilia from Berra's playing days and a reconstruction of the original scoreboard from Yankee Stadium among various other things. A skybox was constructed as part of the museum, and has very limited access. Berra was the primary user of the seats, as he made personal appearances at least twice per year to sign autographs for the fans until 2015; he died several days after the conclusion of that season. The Jackals have also allowed the skybox to be used by professional scouts attending games.

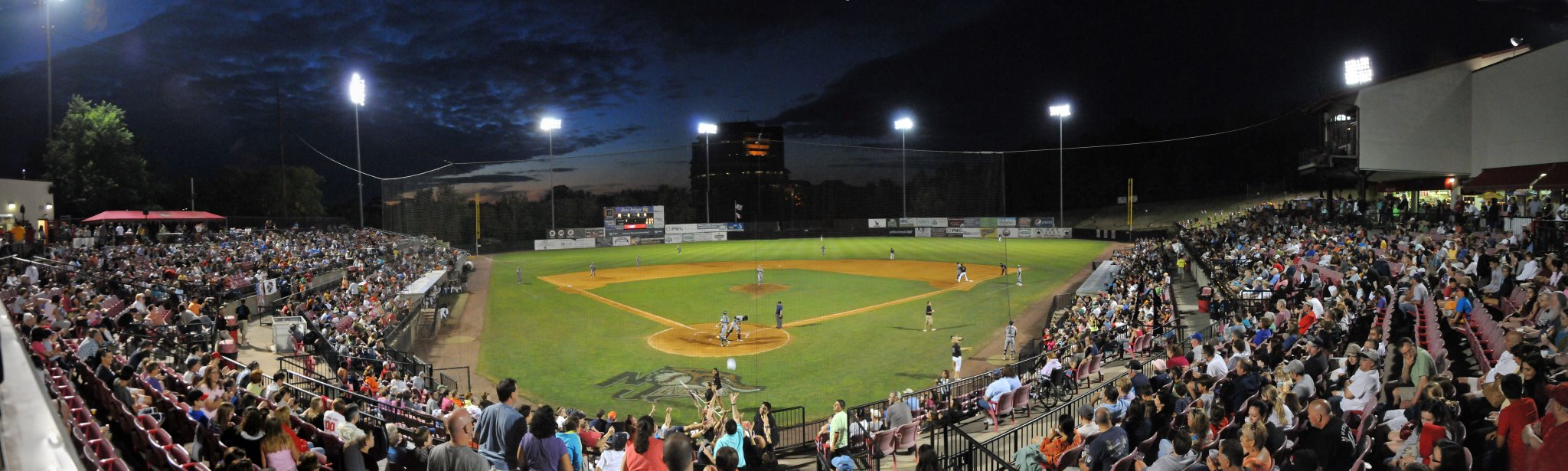
Panoramic view in 2016

The museum addition was completed following the 1998 season and the final phase of construction was completed in early 1999 as the seating areas were renovated and extended, with seats going as far as left and right field and several reserved sections being replaced with box seats, installation of several concession stands and a second set of restrooms, a new team store, and a resurfacing of the stadium's walls with white stucco.

In 2010, world-renowned sculptor Brian Hanlon of Toms River, New Jersey sculpted a statue of Berra that was placed outside of the stadium in front of the museum.

In 2022, the Jackals announced that they would be leaving Yogi Berra Stadium for Hinchliffe Stadium in nearby Paterson. August 25, 2022, was the team's last regular season home game.

=== Renovations ===
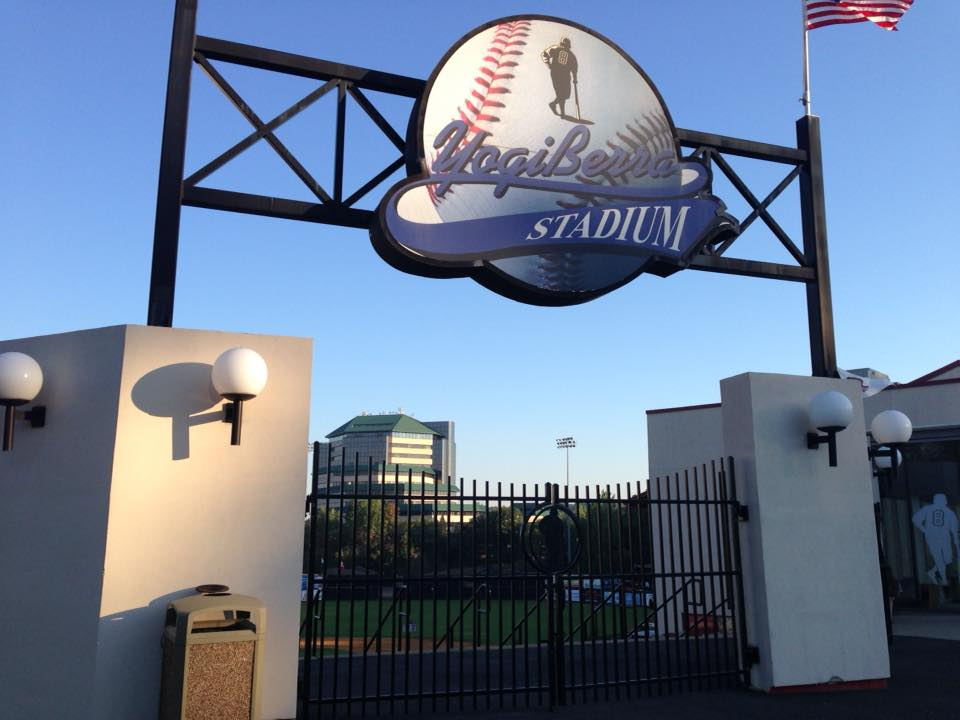
Entrance to the stadium in 2016

For many years, the stadium's official address was 1 Hall Drive, honoring the team's founder. In early 2016, as a further honor for its deceased namesake, the Jackals changed this to 8 Yogi Berra Drive.

In 2018, the Jackals installed a new 720 sq ft (67 m^{2}) Daktronics HD LED video board in left field as part of stadium wide improvements.

Ahead of the 2024 season, Montclair State and NJIT carried out a $5.3 million renovation of the stadium. The renovations included a new artificial turf field, a pitch counter, a new dugout to bullpen phone, replacement of the outfield walls, new storage facility, updated locker room, new bullpens and batting cages, a new scoreboard and signage celebrating the Red Hawk’s three National Champion teams (1987, 1993, 2000). New LED lighting was installed that is more energy efficient, environmentally friendly and meets broadcasting standards that will allow games to be televised on ESPN and other national networks. Additionally, the concession area was renovated and renamed "The Hill" in reference to Yogi Berra’s boyhood neighborhood, The Hill, in St. Louis and the elevated Red Hawks perch for the stadium and campus. The renovations enable to the stadium be a year round facility by hosting conferences, NCAA baseball tournaments and other high-profile events.

Events and tenants
Preceded by Newman Outdoor Field	Host of the NoL All-Star Game; Yogi Berra Stadium; 2000	Succeeded by CanWest Global Park
