= Taylor Motter =

American baseball player (born 1989)

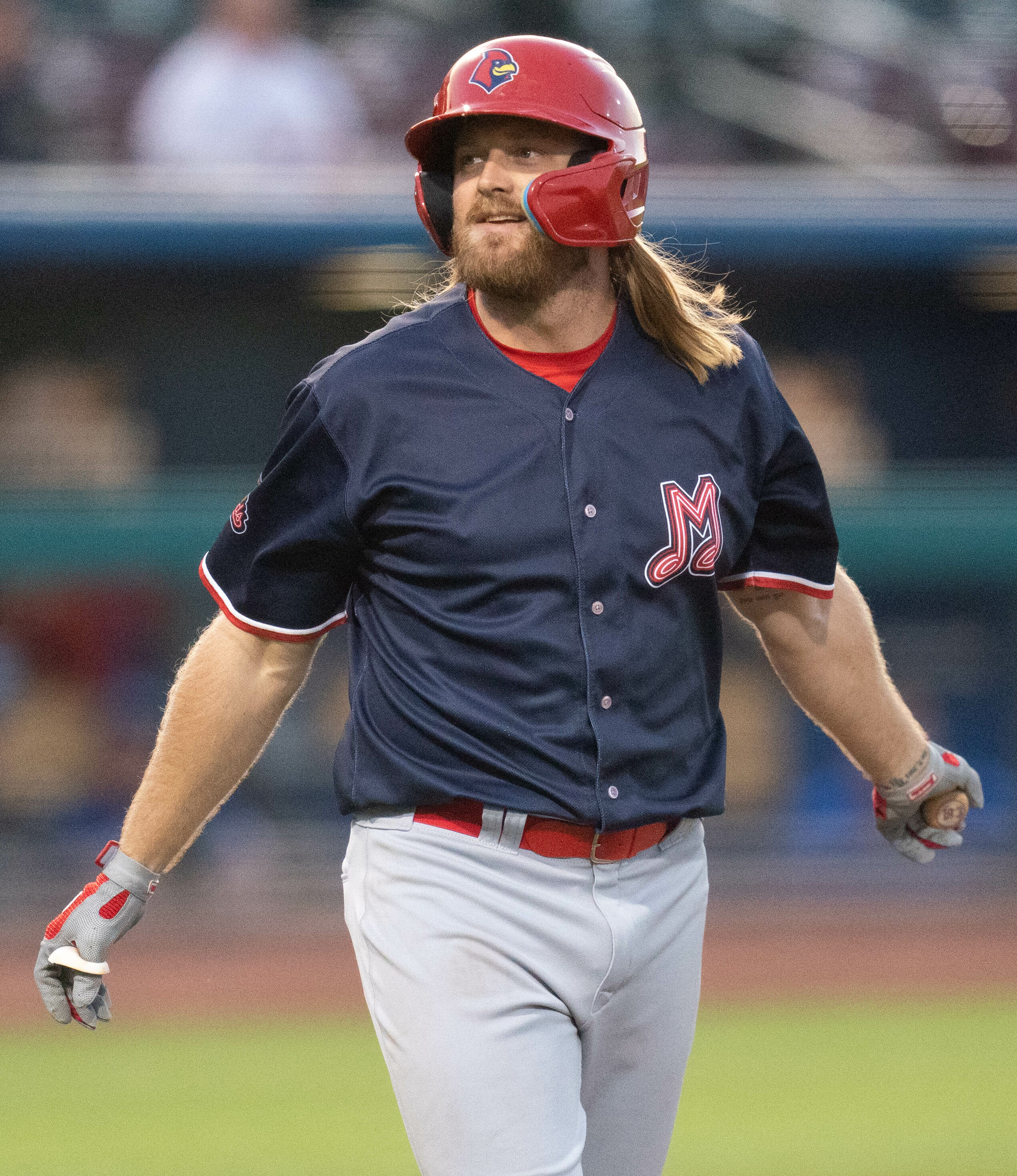
- Motter with the Memphis Redbirds in 2023
- Utility player
- Born: September 18, 1989 (age 36); West Palm Beach, Florida, U.S.
- Batted: Right Threw: Right

Professional debut
- MLB: May 16, 2016, for the Tampa Bay Rays
- KBO: May 5, 2020, for the Kiwoom Heroes

Last appearance
- MLB: August 30, 2023, for the St. Louis Cardinals
- KBO: May 27, 2020, for the Kiwoom Heroes

MLB statistics
- Batting average: .188
- Home runs: 10
- Runs batted in: 40

KBO statistics
- Batting average: .114
- Home runs: 1
- Runs batted in: 3
- Stats at Baseball Reference

Teams
- Tampa Bay Rays (2016); Seattle Mariners (2017–2018); Minnesota Twins (2018); Kiwoom Heroes (2020); Colorado Rockies (2021); Boston Red Sox (2021); Cincinnati Reds (2022); St. Louis Cardinals (2023)

Taylor Davis Motter (born September 18, 1989) is an American former professional baseball utility player. He played in Major League Baseball (MLB) for the Tampa Bay Rays, Seattle Mariners, Minnesota Twins, Colorado Rockies, Boston Red Sox, Cincinnati Reds, and St. Louis Cardinals, and in the KBO League for the Kiwoom Heroes.

== Amateur career ==
Motter graduated from Palm Beach Gardens Community High School in Palm Beach Gardens, Florida and played college baseball at Coastal Carolina University in Conway, South Carolina. In three seasons with the Chanticleers (2009–2011), he appeared in 187 games (185 starts) and had a .303 batting average with 18 home runs and 110 runs batted in (RBIs) with a .482 slugging percentage. He helped lead Coastal Carolina to three consecutive Big South Conference baseball championships, three NCAA Regional appearances, and one NCAA Super Regional appearance (2010). While only hitting .256 with no home runs and three RBIs in 13 Big South tournament games, Motter, in 13 NCAA Regional/Super Regional games, hit .333 with three home runs and nine RBIs while compiling a .622 slugging percentage.

In 2010, Motter played collegiate summer baseball with the Harwich Mariners of the Cape Cod Baseball League. He was drafted by the Tampa Bay Rays in the 17th round of the 2011 MLB draft.

== Professional career ==
=== Tampa Bay Rays ===
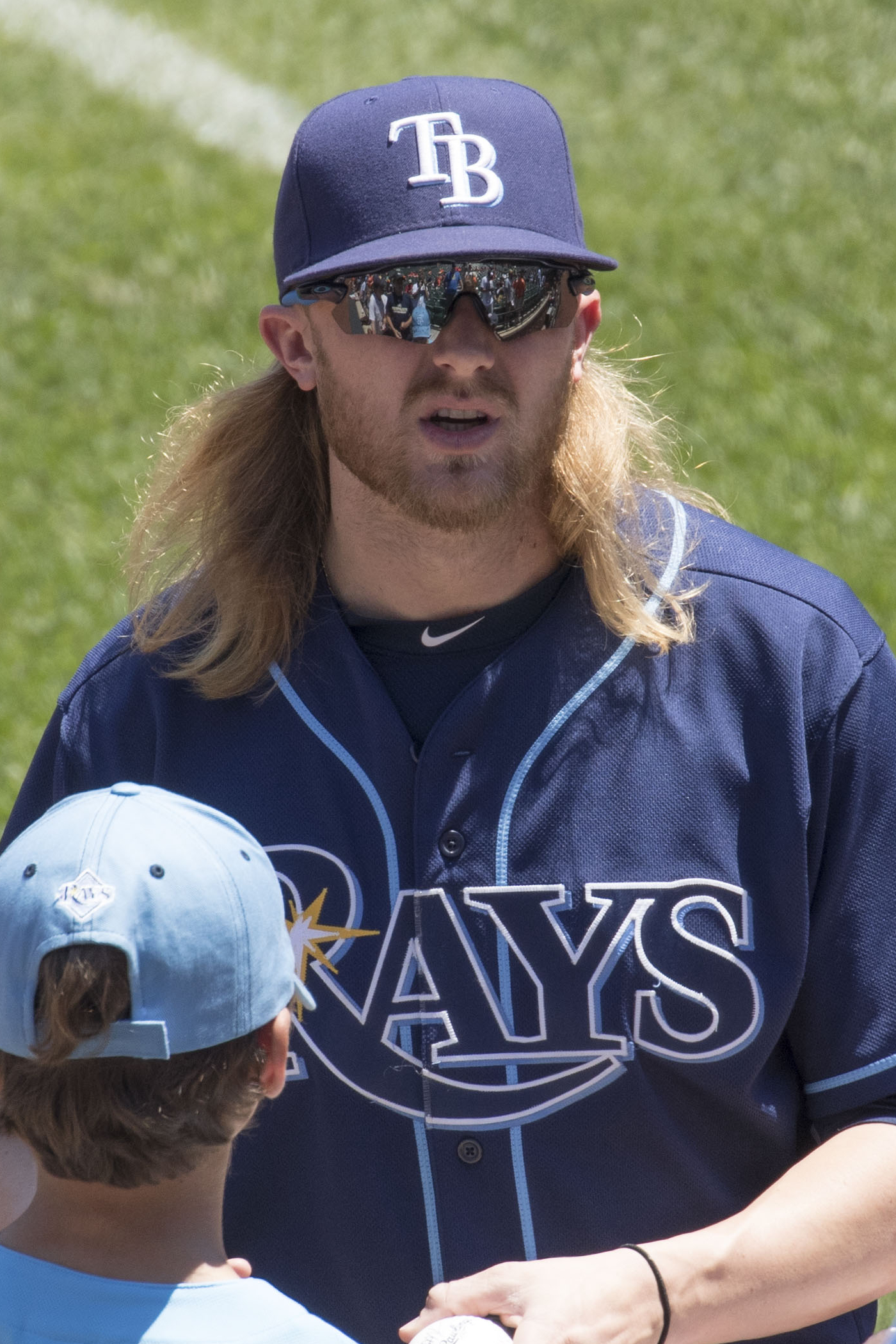
Motter with the Tampa Bay Rays in 2016

In 2011, Motter played in Minor League Baseball with the Princeton Rays and Bowling Green Hot Rods. He spent 2012 with Bowling Green, 2013 with the Gulf Coast Rays and Charlotte Stone Crabs, 2014 with the Montgomery Biscuits and 2015 in Triple-A with the Durham Bulls. In 2014, he was the MVP of the Southern League All-Star Game after going 3-for-3 with a home run. In 2015, Motter was named team MVP of the Durham Bulls after batting .292 and leading the International League in doubles (43) and extra-base hits (58). The Rays added Motter to their 40-man roster after the 2015 season.

Motter was called up to the major leagues on May 15, 2016. He recorded his first major-league hit the next day in his first at bat, off of J. A. Happ of the Toronto Blue Jays. The following game, he hit his first major-league home run, off of Toronto's Drew Storen. Motter made 33 appearances with the 2016 Rays, batting .188 with two home runs and nine RBIs.

=== Seattle Mariners ===
On November 18, 2016, Motter and Richie Shaffer were traded to the Seattle Mariners for Andrew Kittredge, Dalton Kelly, and Dylan Thompson. During 2017, Motter played in 92 games for the Mariners, batting .198 with seven home runs and 26 RBIs. He also played 25 games in Triple-A with the Tacoma Rainiers, where he had a .350 average. Early in the 2018 season, Motter split time between Tacoma (37 games, .197 average) and Seattle (seven games, .267 average).

=== Minnesota Twins ===
On May 28, 2018, Motter was claimed off waivers by the Minnesota Twins. He appeared in nine games with the Twins where he batted .053 (1-for-19); he also played for two Minnesota farm teams. He was designated for assignment on July 24, sent outright to Triple-A on July 27, and released on August 22.

=== Detroit Tigers ===
On March 6, 2019, Motter signed a minor-league deal with the Detroit Tigers organization. He played in 10 games for the Double-A Erie SeaWolves, where he hit .148/.286/.222 with no home runs and 2 RBI. He was released by Detroit on May 14.

=== New Britain Bees ===
On May 21, 2019, Motter signed with the New Britain Bees of the independent Atlantic League of Professional Baseball. In 34 games, he batted .282/.396/.496 with five home runs and 28 RBI.

=== Oakland Athletics ===
On June 25, 2019, Motter's contract was purchased by the Oakland Athletics organization and he was assigned to the Double-A Midland RockHounds. With Midland, Motter played in 60 games while batting .213/.300/.358 with eight home runs and 26 RBI. He elected free agency following the season on November 4.

In November 2019, Motter was selected by the Sugar Land Skeeters of the Atlantic League in the dispersal draft of the New Britain Bees, as the Bees moved to the Futures Collegiate Baseball League and had held rights to Motter within the Atlantic League.

=== Kiwoom Heroes ===
On December 12, 2019, Motter signed with the Kiwoom Heroes of the KBO League on a $350,000 contract. In 10 games with the Heroes in 2020, he batted .114 (4-for-35). Motter was placed on waivers by the team on May 29 after being sent down to their farm team earlier in the month. Motter also played five games and batted .444 (8-for-18) during 2020 with the Jersey Wise Guys of the All-American Baseball Challenge, a six-team recreational league formed in the New York metropolitan area during the COVID-19 pandemic.

=== Colorado Rockies ===
On March 3, 2021, Motter signed a minor-league contract with the Colorado Rockies. After playing in 67 games for the Triple-A Albuquerque Isotopes, hitting .335 with 24 home runs and 57 RBIs, Motter's contract was selected by the Rockies on August 10, 2021. In 13 games for the Rockies, Motter struggled to a .150 average (3-for-20) without a home run or RBI. On August 30, 2021, Motter was designated for assignment by the Rockies.

=== Boston Red Sox ===
On September 2, 2021, Motter was claimed off of waivers by the Boston Red Sox. Two days later, Motter was added to Boston's active roster. After appearing in three games for Boston, he was designated for assignment, then sent outright to the Triple-A Worcester Red Sox. On October 5, Motter elected free agency.

=== Cincinnati Reds ===
On April 14, 2022, Motter signed with the Leones de Yucatán of the Mexican League. However, on April 22, he left the team after signing a minor league contract with the Cincinnati Reds organization. He returned to the Major Leagues when he joined the Reds on May 20. He appeared in two games, going 1-for-6 at the plate, and was returned to Triple-A on May 24. Motter was released by the Reds organization on July 21.

=== Atlanta Braves ===
On July 29, 2022, Motter signed a minor league deal with the Atlanta Braves. He played in 42 games for the Triple-A Gwinnett Stripers to finish the year, hitting .259/.372/.578 with 12 home runs, 36 RBI, and 2 stolen bases. Motter elected free agency following the season on November 10.

=== St. Louis Cardinals ===
On November 18, 2022, Motter signed a minor league deal with the St. Louis Cardinals. On March 25, 2023, the Cardinals announced that Motter had made the Opening Day roster after an impressive spring, and formally selected his contract to the 40-man roster. Motter appeared in 7 games with St. Louis, hitting .222/.300/.333 across 20 plate appearances. He was designated for assignment on April 23, after Paul DeJong was activated off of the injured list. He cleared waivers and was sent outright to the Triple-A Memphis Redbirds on April 25. After electing free agency, Motter re-signed with the Cardinals on a major league contract the following day. He made one appearance, going 0-for-2 against the Los Angeles Angels, before he was designated for assignment again on May 6 when Tres Barrera was added to the roster. He again cleared waivers and was sent outright to Memphis on May 8. On July 23, Motter was selected back to the active roster and slotted as the starting second baseman in that day's game against the Chicago Cubs. Motter was designated for assignment again on September 5. He once again cleared waivers and was sent outright to Memphis on September 7. On October 2, Motter elected free agency.

=== Staten Island FerryHawks ===
On April 21, 2024, Motter signed with the Staten Island FerryHawks of the Atlantic League of Professional Baseball. In 28 games for the FerryHawks, Motter hit .340/.434/.632 with eight home runs and 24 RBI.

=== Leones de Yucatán ===
On June 5, 2024, Motter signed with the Leones de Yucatán of the Mexican League. In 40 appearances for Yucatán, he slashed .303/.352/.566 with 11 home runs, 31 RBI, and two stolen bases. Motter was released on January 8, 2025.
