= Alfredo Marte =

Dominican baseball player (born 1989)

- Left fielder
- Born: March 31, 1989 (age 37); Santo Domingo, Dominican Republic
- Batted: Right Threw: Right

MLB debut
- April 2, 2013, for the Arizona Diamondbacks

Last MLB appearance
- June 23, 2015, for the Los Angeles Angels

MLB statistics
- Batting average: .181
- Home runs: 2
- Runs batted in: 13
- Stats at Baseball Reference

Teams
- Arizona Diamondbacks (2013–2014); Los Angeles Angels of Anaheim (2015)

Alfredo Marte (born March 31, 1989) is a Dominican former professional baseball left fielder. He played in Major League Baseball (MLB) for the Arizona Diamondbacks and Los Angeles Angels of Anaheim.

== Career ==
=== Arizona Diamondbacks ===
In 2011, Marte was suspended for testing positive for Stanozolol, a performance-enhancing drug. Marte represented the Diamondbacks at the 2012 All-Star Futures Game. After the 2012 season, the Diamondbacks added him to their 40-man roster. On April 2, 2013, Marte made his major league debut against the St. Louis Cardinals, recording no hits in 3 at-bats. He appeared in 22 games for Arizona in 2013, hitting .186/.271/.256 with no home runs and 4 RBI in 43 at-bats. In 2014, Marte appeared in 44 contests, slashing .170/.221/.292 with 2 home runs and 9 RBI in 106 at-bats.

=== Los Angeles Angels ===
The Los Angeles Angels of Anaheim claimed Marte on waivers from the Diamondbacks on October 7, 2014. On November 25, Marte was removed from the 40-man roster and sent outright to the Triple-A Salt Lake Bees.

In 2015, he spent some time up with Los Angeles but would be optioned down to the Salt Lake Bees on June 2.

=== Baltimore Orioles ===
On December 14, 2015, Marte signed a minor league contract with the Baltimore Orioles organization. He did not make the team out of spring training and was sent to the Triple-A Norfolk Tides to begin the 2016 season. In two games for Norfolk, Marte went 0-for-5.

=== Philadelphia Phillies ===
On April 18, 2016, Marte was traded to the Philadelphia Phillies in exchange for a player to be named later. In 10 appearances for the Triple-A Lehigh Valley IronPigs, he went 5-for-31 (.161) with one RBI and one walk. Marte was released by the Phillies organization on May 16.

=== York Revolution ===
On May 27, 2016, Marte signed with the York Revolution of the Atlantic League of Professional Baseball. In 34 appearances for York, Marte slashed .258/.319/.402 with five home runs, 14 RBI, and two stolen bases.

=== Southern Maryland Blue Crabs ===
On July 8, 2016, Marte was traded to the Southern Maryland Blue Crabs. In 58 appearances for Southern Maryland, Marte batted .220/.286/.430 with 10 home runs, 21 RBI, and seven stolen bases.

=== Bravos de León ===
On March 30, 2017, Marte signed with the Bravos de León of the Mexican League. In 44 games for León, he slashed .263/.345/.417 with six home runs, 25 RBI, and five stolen bases. Marte was released by the Bravos on May 23.

=== New Jersey Jackals ===
On April 11, 2019, Marte signed with the New Jersey Jackals of the Can-Am League. He posted a career year, batting .311/.388/.531 and leading the league in home runs (16), RBI (88), doubles (29), and extra-base hits (45). He helped lead the Jackals to the 2019 Can-Am League Championship Series, where they defeated the Sussex County Miners and won their first ever league crown. Marte was later named the 2019 Can-Am League Player of the Year.

Following the 2020 season, the Can-Am League merged into the Frontier League. Marte later signed a contract extension with the Jackals, but the 2020 season was canceled due to the COVID-19 pandemic.

Marte re-signed with the Jackals for the 2021 season. In 38 games, he slashed .281/.348/.493 with 7 home runs and 29 RBI.

=== Pericos de Puebla ===
On July 15, 2021, Marte's contract was purchased by the Pericos de Puebla of the Mexican League. He appeared in 18 games, slashing .275/.311/.507 with 4 home runs and 12 RBIs. Marte was released following the season on October 20.

=== New Jersey Jackals (second stint) ===
On March 10, 2022, Marte signed with the New Jersey Jackals of the Frontier League. In 83 games for the club, he batted .295/.354/.533 with 18 home runs, 82 RBI, and 10 stolen bases.

In 2023, Marte played in 94 games for the Jackals, hitting .311/.384/.548 with 21 home runs and 90 RBI. On October 12, 2023, Marte elected free agency.

=== New York Boulders ===
On April 20, 2024, Marte signed with the New York Boulders of the Frontier League. He played in only 1 game for the Boulders, going 2–for–4 with no home runs or RBI. Marte was released by the Boulders on May 11.

On May 7, 2025, Marte re-signed with the Boulders as a player/hitting coach. In 86 games he hit .261/.349/.361 with 6 home runs, 62 RBIs and 7 stolen bases.
