= Joel Bennett =

American baseball player (born 1970)

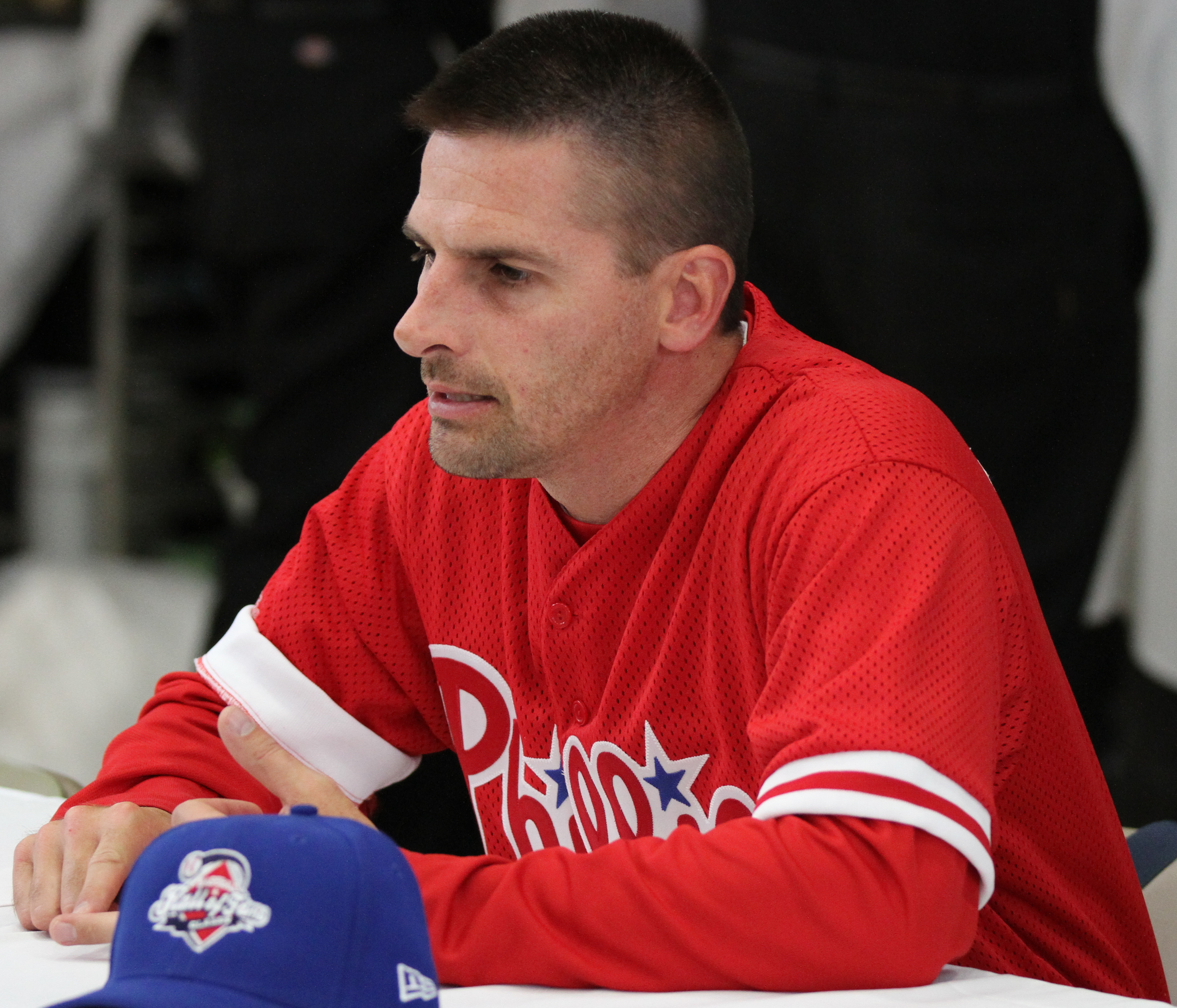
- Bennett in 2009
- Pitcher
- Born: January 31, 1970 (age 56); Binghamton, New York
- Batted: Right Threw: Right

MLB debut
- July 15, 1998, for the Baltimore Orioles

Last MLB appearance
- June 6, 1999, for the Philadelphia Phillies

MLB statistics
- Win–loss record: 2–1
- Earned run average: 8.53
- Strikeouts: 13
- Stats at Baseball Reference

Teams
- Baltimore Orioles (1998); Philadelphia Phillies (1999)

Joel Bennett (born January 31, 1970) is an American former professional baseball pitcher, who played in Major League Baseball (MLB) from 1998 to 1999. He batted and threw right-handed.

Bennett was drafted by the Boston Red Sox in the 21st round of the 1991 amateur draft. He played in 1998 with the Baltimore Orioles and in 1999 with the Philadelphia Phillies.

Bennett currently teaches physical education at Windsor Central Middle School in Windsor, New York. He also coaches JV Baseball, as well as varsity Golf for Windsor Central High School.
