= Argenis Reyes =

Dominican baseball player (born 1982)

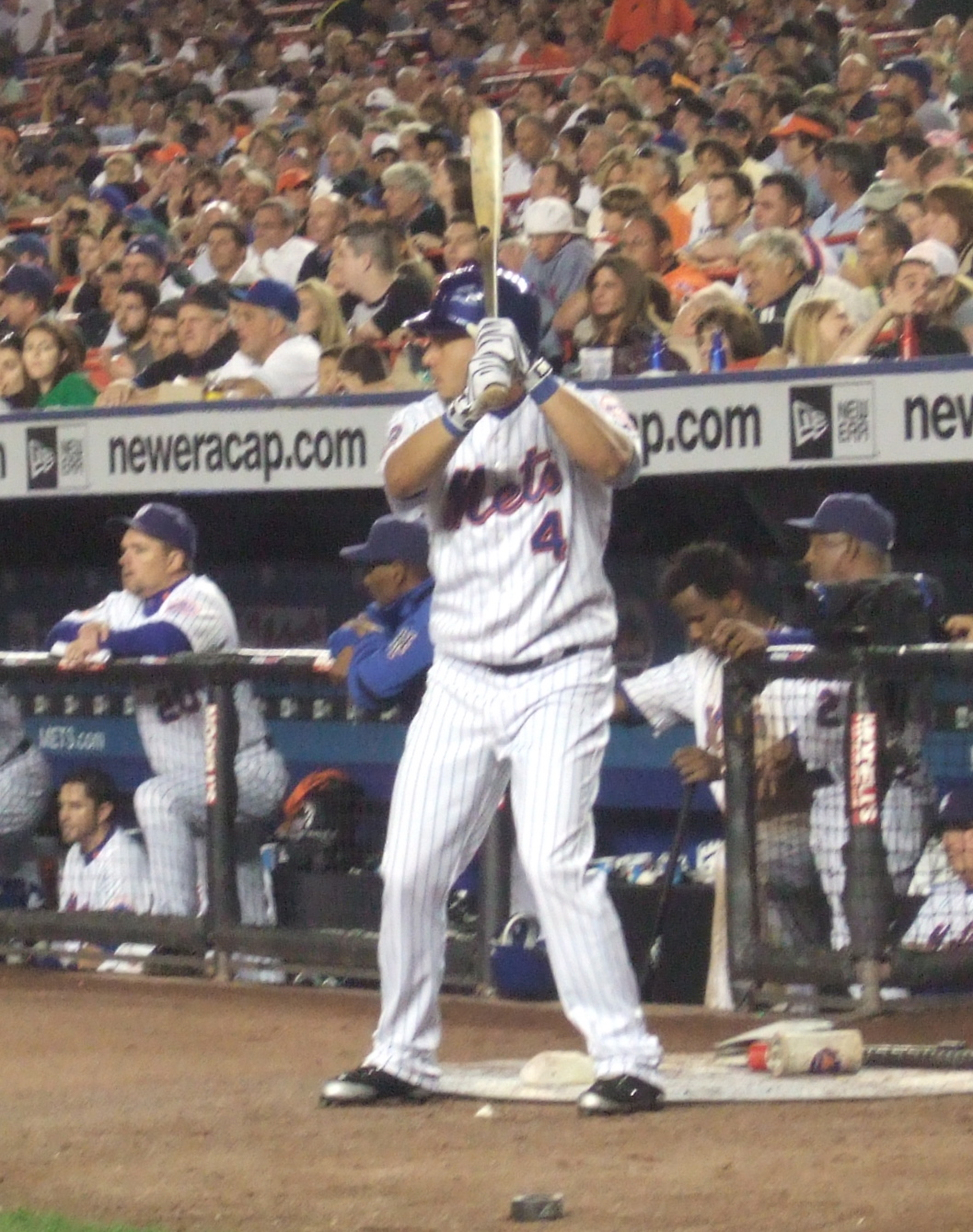
- Reyes with the New York Mets
- Second baseman
- Born: September 25, 1982 (age 44); Santiago, Dominican Republic
- Batted: Switch Threw: Right

MLB debut
- July 3, 2008, for the New York Mets

Last MLB appearance
- July 10, 2009, for the New York Mets

MLB statistics
- Batting average: .205
- Home runs: 1
- Runs batted in: 3
- Stats at Baseball Reference

Teams
- New York Mets (2008–2009)

Argenis N. Reyes Sanchez (born September 25, 1982) is a Dominican former professional baseball second baseman. Formerly a member or the New York Mets organization, he is not related to former teammate José Reyes, although the two were childhood friends in the Dominican Republic.. Reyes has also received attention from Mets fans in the past due to his unusual first name.

== Career ==
Reyes was originally signed as an undrafted free agent by the Cleveland Indians in 2001. He played in the Indians farm system through 2007. His final stop was with the Akron Aeros in the AA Eastern League, where he hit .278 in 125 games in 2007.

He signed as a minor league free agent with the New York Mets in 2008 and played with the AAA New Orleans Zephyrs, where he hit .283 in 81 games. He was called up to the Mets on July 3, 2008, to replace Luis Castillo when he was placed on the disabled list. Reyes made his Major League debut the same day, coming in as a defensive replacement at second base in the seventh inning for Damion Easley against the St. Louis Cardinals.

On July 8, 2008, Reyes collected his first major league hit at Shea Stadium against Jack Taschner of the San Francisco Giants. He later hit his first career home run on July 25, 2008, off Brad Thompson of the St. Louis Cardinals. He hit .218 in 49 games for the Mets in 2008. In 2009, he appeared in 9 games with the Mets, and hit .118 in 17 at-bats.

On January 11, 2010, Reyes signed a minor league contract with the Los Angeles Dodgers with an invite to spring training. He was unable to make the Dodgers' roster and was released at the conclusion of spring training. On April 8, 2010, it was announced that he had signed a contract to play for the New Jersey Jackals (Little Falls, NJ) of the independent Can-Am League. The Boston Red Sox signed Reyes from the Jackals in July 2010. On August 5, 2010, Reyes was traded by Boston to Cleveland and was assigned to the Columbus Clippers. On March 18, 2011, Reyes was dropped and picked up again by the Jackals before being sold back to Cleveland on July 31, 2011. He re-signed a minor league contract with Cleveland on January 6, 2012, but did not play a game before retiring.
