= Roniel Raudes =

Nicaraguan baseball player (born 1998)

- Pitcher
- Born: January 16, 1998 (age 28); Granada, Nicaragua
- Bats: Right Throws: Right

Roniel Antonio Raudes Meza (Spanish pronunciation: [roˈnjel ãn̪ˈt̪o.njo ˈrau̯.ð̞es ˈme.sa], born January 16, 1998) is a Nicaraguan former professional baseball pitcher. Listed at 6 feet 1 inch (1.85 m) and 160 pounds (73 kg), he bats and throws right-handed.

== Career ==
=== Boston Red Sox ===
The Boston Red Sox selected Raudes in the 2014 MLB International Draft, signing him a bonus of $250,000. Raudes throws an 89–91 mph (143–146 km/h) fastball with a maximum speed of 93 mph (150 km/h). According to Red Sox scouts, he should throw harder once he adds some muscle to his skinny frame and physically matures without losing much athleticism. He also has a pair of promising secondary pitches, with his downer curveball at 74–76 mph (119–122 km/h) presently ranking ahead of his fading 82–84 mph (132–135 km/h) changeup. Raudes has been known to use an unorthodox pitching delivery motion.

Aside from Anderson Espinoza, Raudes had the best season of any Red Sox minor league pitcher in 2015. Only 17 years old, Raudes led the rookie-level Dominican Summer League with a very significant strikeout-to-walk ratio (63-to-3) in 53 2/3 innings, which he concluded with a 3–0 record in four rookie-level Gulf Coast League starts, while allowing two earned runs for a 0.90 ERA in 20 innings. He was selected to the DSL All-Star Team and also was ranked by Baseball America as the Red Sox' number 24 prospect after the season.

In 2016, Raudes joined the Low-A Greenville Drive, where he posted an 8–2 record with a 3.78 ERA in his first 14 starts and represented his team in the South Atlantic League All-Star Game. His first career highlight came on August 18, when he shut out the Kannapolis Intimidators, 2–0, completing seven innings in the longest start of his professional career, striking out four batters while only allowing four hits and one walk. Overall, Raudes went 11–6 with a 3.65 ERA and 1.19 WHIP in 24 starts, with 104 strikeouts and 23 walks in 113 1/3 innings. He finished third in wins in the Red Sox minor league system while posting the sixth-best ERA among starters. At 18, Raudes showed consistency in Greenville as the youngest pitcher in the league, as he had a chance to emerge as a mid-rotation starter as he matures physically and mentally.

Raudes spent 2017 with the High-A Salem Red Sox, where he pitched to a 4–7 record and 4.50 ERA in 23 games started. He finished the year rated as the Red Sox' number 12 prospect, according to MLB.com. Raudes also spent the 2018 season with Salem, recording a 2–5 record in 11 games (all starts) with a 3.67 ERA; he spent approximately four months on the disabled list. Raudes underwent Tommy John surgery in January 2019, and did not pitch during the 2019 season. Late in 2020, after the minor league season was cancelled, Raudes played briefly in the Nicaraguan Professional Baseball League, but left his team due to an unspecified health issue. Raudes was assigned to the Florida Complex League Red Sox in July 2021, but was subsequently placed on the restricted list without having appeared in a game.

Raudes began the 2022 season in extended spring training. He was released by the Red Sox on July 2, 2022.

=== York Revolution ===
On July 17, 2022, Raudes signed with the York Revolution of the Atlantic League of Professional Baseball. In 28 appearances for York, he recorded a 1.82 ERA with 35 strikeouts across 29 2/3 innings pitched. Raudes became a free agent following the season.

=== New Jersey Jackals ===
On January 12, 2023, Raudes signed with the New Jersey Jackals of the Frontier League. However, he did not pitch in 2023, and re-signed with the Jackals on October 12. Raudes made 5 appearances out of the bullpen for the Jackals in 2024, posting a 9.00 ERA and 5 strikeouts over 5 innings. On June 1, 2024, Raudes was released by the Jackals.
