= Stone Lake, Wisconsin =

Town in Wisconsin, United States

- Town
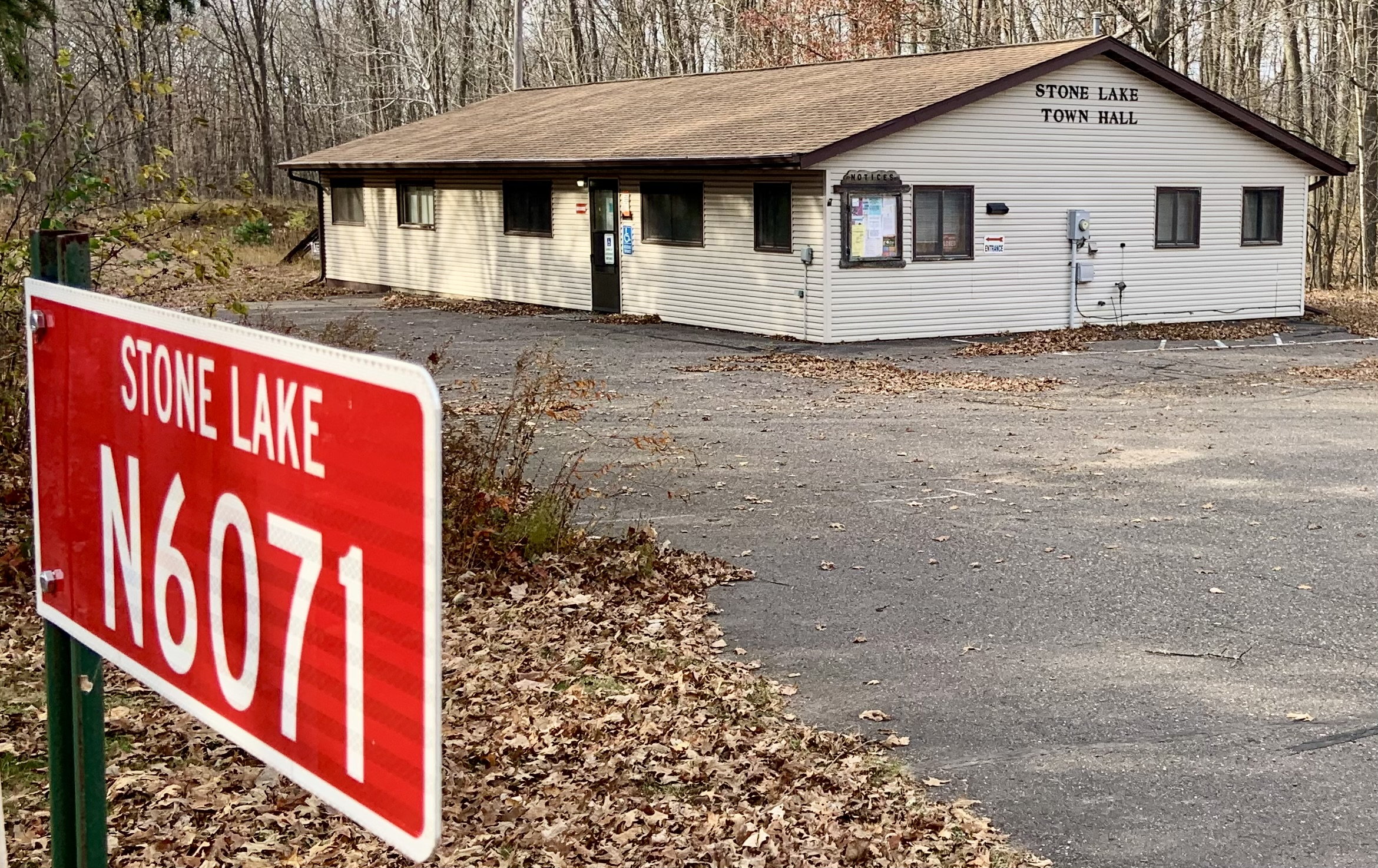
- Town hall

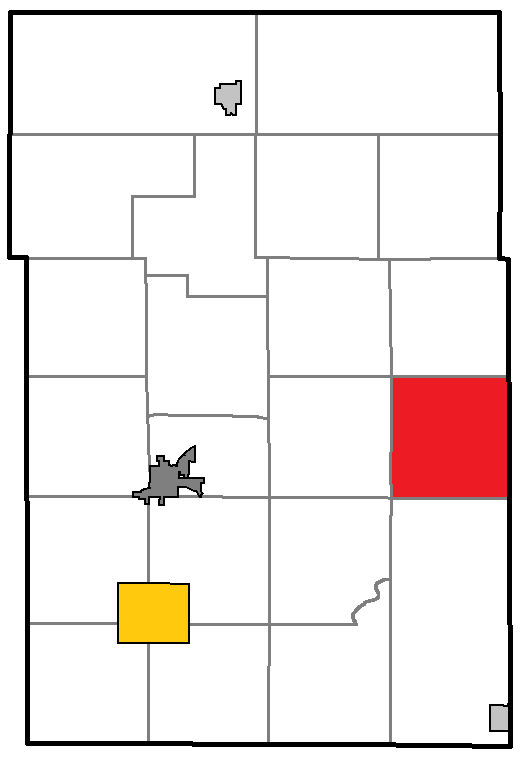
- Location of Stone Lake, within Washburn County
- Coordinates: 45°51′35″N 91°35′7″W
- Country: United States
- State: Wisconsin
- County: Washburn

Government
  - Mayor: Ivory Hecker

Area
  - Total: 34.8 sq mi (90.2 km^{2})
  - Land: 33.7 sq mi (87.2 km^{2})
  - Water: 1.2 sq mi (3.0 km^{2})
- Elevation: 1,263 ft (385 m)

Population (2020)
  - Total: 515
  - Density: 15.3/sq mi (5.91/km^{2})
- Time zone: UTC-6 (Central (CST))
  - Summer (DST): UTC-5 (CDT)
- Area codes: 715 & 534
- FIPS code: 55-77650
- GNIS feature ID: 1584232

Stone Lake is a town in Washburn County, Wisconsin, United States. The population was 515 at the 2020 census. The census-designated place of Stone Lake is located partially in the town.

== Geography ==
According to the United States Census Bureau, the town has a total area of 34.8 square miles (90.2 km^{2}), of which 33.7 square miles (87.2 km^{2}) is land and 1.2 square miles (3.0 km^{2}) (3.36%) is water.

== Demographics ==
As of the census of 2000, there were 544 people, 221 households, and 158 families residing in the town. The population density was 16.2 people per square mile (6.2/km^{2}). There were 362 housing units at an average density of 10.8 per square mile (4.2/km^{2}). The racial makeup of the town was 98.53% White, 0.92% Native American, 0.18% Asian, and 0.37% from two or more races. Hispanic or Latino of any race were 0.74% of the population.

There were 221 households, out of which 25.8% had children under the age of 18 living with them, 62.4% were married couples living together, 5.4% had a female householder with no husband present, and 28.1% were non-families. 24.0% of all households were made up of individuals, and 12.7% had someone living alone who was 65 years of age or older. The average household size was 2.46 and the average family size was 2.94.

In the town, the population was spread out, with 23.5% under the age of 18, 5.9% from 18 to 24, 25.9% from 25 to 44, 26.8% from 45 to 64, and 17.8% who were 65 years of age or older. The median age was 42 years. For every 100 females, there were 107.6 males. For every 100 females age 18 and over, there were 105.9 males.

The median income for a household in the town was $33,021, and the median income for a family was $37,000. Males had a median income of $27,500 versus $22,083 for females. The per capita income for the town was $15,219. About 9.3% of families and 13.2% of the population were below the poverty line, including 24.7% of those under age 18 and 9.2% of those age 65 or over.

== Events ==
The town celebrates an annual cranberry festival, which draws thousands to Stone Lake on the first Saturday of October.
