= List of professional sports teams in Quebec =

Quebec is the second-most populated province in Canada and has a rich history of professional sports. Most professional sports teams in the province reside in Greater Montreal.

== Active teams ==
=== Major league teams ===
Quebec is home to three major professional sports teams. All of the teams play in Montreal.

Canadian football
| League | Team | City | Stadium | Capacity |
| CFL | Montreal Alouettes | Montreal | Percival Molson Memorial Stadium | 23,035 |
Ice hockey
| League | Team | City | Arena | Capacity |
| NHL | Montreal Canadiens | Montreal | Bell Centre | 20,962 |
Soccer
| League | Team | City | Stadium | Capacity |
| MLS | CF Montréal | Montreal | Saputo Stadium | 19,619 |

=== Other professional sports teams ===
==== Men's leagues ====
Baseball
| League | Team | City | Stadium | Capacity |
| FL (Ind.) | Québec Capitales | Quebec City | Stade Canac | 4,297 |
| FL (Ind.) | Trois-Rivières Aigles | Trois-Rivières | Stade Quillorama | 3,700 |
Basketball
| League | Team | City | Arena | Capacity |
| CEBL | Montreal Alliance | Montreal | Verdun Auditorium | 4,114 |
Ice hockey
| League | Team | City | Arena | Capacity |
| AHL | Laval Rocket | Laval | Place Bell | 10,172 |
| ECHL | Trois-Rivières Lions | Trois-Rivières | Colisée Vidéotron | 4,390 |
| LNAH | Jonquière Marquis | Saguenay | Palais des Sports de Saguenay | 3,200 |
| LNAH | National de Québec | L'Ancienne-Lorette | Complexe Sportif Bonair | 2,000 |
| LNAH | Rivière-du-Loup 3L | Rivière-du-Loup | Centre Premier Tech | 3,000 |
| LNAH | Saint-Georges Cool FM 103.5 | Saint-Georges | Centre Sportif Lacroix-Dutil | 2,476 |
| LNAH | Saint-Hyacinthe Bataillon | Saint-Hyacinthe | Stade L.P. Gaucher | 2,048 |
| LNAH | Sorel-Tracy Éperviers | Sorel-Tracy | Colisée Cardin | 3,037 |
| LNAH | Thetford Assurancia | Thetford Mines | Centre Mario Gosselin | 2,500 |
Soccer
| League | Team | City | Stadium | Capacity |
| CPL | FC Supra du Québec | Laval | Stade Boreale | 5,581 |
Ultimate Frisbee
| League | Team | City | Stadium | Capacity |
| UFA | Montreal Royal | Montreal | Complexe sportif Claude-Robillard | 13,034 |

==== Women's leagues ====
Ice hockey
| League | Team | City | Arena | Capacity |
| PWHL | Montreal Victoire | Laval | Place Bell | 10,172 |
Soccer
| League | Team | City | Stadium | Capacity |
| NSL | Montreal Roses FC | Laval | Stade Boreale | 5,581 |

=== Map of cities with a professional sports team ===
Location with a professional sports team

== Former teams ==
=== Major league teams ===
Baseball
| League | Team | City | Years |
| MLB | Montreal Expos | Montreal | 1969-2004 |
Ice hockey
| League | Team | City | Years |
| NHL | Montreal Wanderers | Montreal | 1917-1918 |
| NHL | Montreal Maroons | Montreal | 1924-1938 |
| NHL | Quebec Bulldogs | Quebec City | 1919-1920 |
| NHL | Quebec Nordiques | Quebec City | 1979-1995 |
| NHA | Montreal Canadiens | Montreal | 1909-1917 |
| NHA | Montreal Shamrocks | Montreal | 1909-1910 |
| NHA | Montreal Wanderers | Montreal | 1909-1917 |
| NHA | Quebec Bulldogs | Quebec City | 1910-1917 |
| WHA | Quebec Nordiques | Quebec City | 1972-1979 |
Canadian football
| League | Team | City | Years |
| CFL | Montreal Alouettes | Montreal | 1958-1981; 1986-1987 |
| CFL | Montreal Concordes | Montreal | 1982-1985 |
| IRFU | Montreal Football Club | Montreal | 1907-1915 |
| IRFU | Montreal AAA Winged Wheelers | Montreal | 1919-1935 |
| IRFU | Montreal Indians | Montreal | 1936-1937 |
| IRFU | Montreal Cubs | Montreal | 1938 |
| IRFU | Montreal Royals | Montreal | 1939 |
| IRFU | Montreal Bulldogs | Montreal | 1940-1941 |
| IRFU | Montreal Hornets | Montreal | 1945 |
| IRFU | Montreal Alouettes | Montreal | 1946-1957 |

=== Other former teams ===
==== Men's leagues ====
American football
| League | Team | City | Years |
| WLAF | Montreal Machine | Montreal | 1991-1992 |
| UFL | Quebec Rifles | Montreal | 1964 |
Baseball
| League | Team | City | Years |
| IL (AAA) | Montreal Royals | Montreal | 1912-1917; 1928-1960 |
| EL (AA) | Quebec Carnavals | Quebec City | 1971-1975 |
| EL (AA) | Quebec Metros | Quebec City | 1976-1977 |
| EL (AA) | Sherbrooke Pirates | Sherbrooke | 1972-1973 |
| EL (AA) | Thetford Mines Pirates | Thetford Mines | 1974 |
| EL (AA) | Thetford Mines Miners | Thetford Mines | 1975 |
| EL (AA) | Trois-Rivières Aigles | Trois-Rivières | 1971-1977 |
| BL (C) | Sherbrooke Canadians | Sherbrooke | 1946 |
| Can-Am (C) | Quebec Athletics | Quebec City | 1941-1942 |
| Can-Am (C) | Quebec Alouettes | Quebec City | 1946-1948 |
| Can-Am (C) | Quebec Braves | Quebec City | 1948-1950 |
| Can-Am (C) | Trois-Rivières Renards | Trois-Rivières | 1941-1942 |
| Can-Am (C) | Trois-Rivières Royals | Trois-Rivières | 1946-1950 |
| PL (C/Ind.) | Drummondville Tigers | Drummondville | 1940 |
| PL (C/Ind.) | Drummondville Cubs | Drummondville | 1948-1952 |
| PL (C/Ind.) | Drummondville Royals | Drummondville | 1953 |
| PL (C/Ind.) | Drummondville A's | Drummondville | 1954 |
| PL (C/Ind.) | Farnham Pirates | Farnham | 1948-1951 |
| PL (C/Ind.) | Granby Red Sox | Granby | 1948-1951 |
| PL (C/Ind.) | Granby Phillies | Granby | 1952-1953 |
| PL (C/Ind.) | Quebec Braves | Quebec City | 1951-1955 |
| PL (C/Ind.) | Sherbrooke Athletics | Sherbrooke | 1948-1951 |
| PL (C/Ind.) | Sherbrooke Indians | Sherbrooke | 1953-1955 |
| PL (C/Ind.) | St. Hyacinthe Saints | St. Hyacinthe | 1948-1951 |
| PL (C/Ind.) | St. Hyacinthe A's | St. Hyacinthe | 1952-1953 |
| PL (C/Ind.) | Saint-Jean Braves | Saint-Jean | 1948-1951 |
| PL (C/Ind.) | Saint-Jean Canadiens | Saint-Jean | 1952-1955 |
| PL (C/Ind.) | Thetford Mines Miners | Thetford Mines | 1953-1955 |
| PL (C/Ind.) | Trois-Rivières Renards | Trois-Rivières | 1940 |
| PL (C/Ind.) | Trois-Rivières Royals | Trois-Rivières | 1951 |
| PL (C/Ind.) | Trois-Rivières Yankees | Trois-Rivières | 1952-1953 |
| PL (C/Ind.) | Trois-Rivières Phillies | Trois-Rivières | 1954-1955 |
| CBL (Ind.) | Montreal Royales | Sherbrooke | 2003 |
| CBL (Ind.) | Trois-Rivières Saints | Trois-Rivières | 2003 |
| NOL (Ind.) | Quebec Capitales | Quebec City | 1999-2002 |
| NEL (Ind.) | Quebec Capitales | Quebec City | 2003-2004 |
| Can-Am (Ind.) | Quebec Capitales | Quebec City | 2005-2019 |
| Can-Am (Ind.) | Trois-Rivières Aigles | Trois-Rivières | 2013-2019 |
Basketball
| League | Team | City | Years |
| NBL-C | Montreal Dragons | Montreal | 1993 |
| ABA | Quebec Kebs | Quebec City | 2006-2008 |
| PBL | Quebec Kebs | Quebec City; Laval | 2008-2009; 2009-2011 |
| NBL-CA | Montreal Jazz | Montreal | 2012-2013 |
| NBL-CA | Quebec Kebs | Laval | 2011-2012 |
| TBL | Montreal Toundra | Montreal | 2023 |
| BSL | Montreal Toundra | Montreal | 2023-2024; 2025-2026 |
Ice hockey
| League | Team | City | Years |
| AHL | Montreal Voyageurs | Montreal | 1969-1971 |
| AHL | Quebec Aces | Quebec City | 1959-1971 |
| AHL | Quebec Citadelles | Quebec City | 1999-2002 |
| AHL | Sherbrooke Jets | Sherbrooke | 1982-1984 |
| AHL | Sherbrooke Canadiens | Sherbrooke | 1984-1990 |
| IHL | Quebec Rafales | Quebec City | 1959-1963 |
| QHL | Chicoutimi Saguenéens | Chicoutimi | 1953-1959 |
| QHL | Montreal Royals | Montreal | 1953-1959 |
| QHL | Quebec Aces | Quebec City | 1953-1959 |
| QHL | Shawinigan-Falls Cataracts | Shawinigan Falls | 1954-1958 |
| QHL | Sherbrooke Saints | Sherbrooke | 1953-1954 |
| QHL | Trois-Rivières Lions | Trois-Rivières | 1955-1959 |
| QHL | Valleyfield Braves | Valleyfield | 1953-1955 |
| EPHL | Hull-Ottawa Canadiens | Hull | 1959-1963 |
| EPHL | Montreal Royals | Montreal | 1959-1961 |
| EPHL | Trois-Rivières Lions | Trois-Rivières | 1959-1960 |
Inline hockey
| League | Team | City | Years |
| RHI | Montreal Roadrunners | Montreal | 1994-1997 |

==== Women's leagues ====
Ice hockey
| League | Team | City | Years |
| CWHL | Montreal Stars | Montreal | 2007-2015 |
| CWHL | Quebec Phenix | Montreal | 2007-2008 |
| CWHL | Montreal Canadiennes | Montreal | 2015-2019 |
| PHF | Montreal Force | Montreal | 2022-2023 |

== See also ==
- Professional sports in Canada
- List of professional sports teams in Canada by city
