= Nap Gulley =

American baseball player (1924–1999)

- Pitcher / Outfielder
- Born: August 29, 1924; Huttig, Arkansas, U.S.
- Died: August 21, 1999 (aged 74); Skokie, Illinois, U.S.
- Batted: Left Threw: Left

Negro league baseball debut
- 1943, for the Cleveland Buckeyes

Last appearance
- 1947, for the Newark Eagles
- Stats at Baseball Reference

Teams
- Cleveland Buckeyes (1943–1945); Newark Eagles (1947)

Napoleon Gulley (August 29, 1924 – August 21, 1999) was an American Negro league pitcher in the 1940s.

== Early life ==
Napoleon Gulley was born on August 29, 1924, in Huttig, Arkansas, to parents Roland G. Gulley and Cinderella Fountain. He attended Vashon High School in St. Louis, Missouri, where he played baseball, basketball, and football.

== Playing career ==
=== Major Leagues ===
==== Kansas City Monarchs ====
At the age of 16 while playing for local semi pro teams in Missouri, Gulley was signed by Dizzy Dismukes, then general manager of the Kansas City Monarchs. Gulley briefly joined the Monarchs in spring training before he was traded to the Birmingham Black Barons.

==== Birmingham Black Barons ====
Gulley was a member of the Black Barons pitching staff in 1941 and 1942, though he did not make any recorded appearances in league play.

==== Cleveland Buckeyes ====
Gulley joined the Cleveland Buckeyes in 1943 and remained on the pitching staff through 1945. Gulley is credited with a single league appearance (a complete game loss) with Cleveland, though he often pitched in spring training and exhibitions for the club. In 1943, Gulley suffered an unspecified injury and was sidelined by July. Unhappy with limited playing time in 1945, Gulley asked for and received his unconditional release. Shortly after, he then joined former Black Barons teammate Ted Radcliffe on Abe Saperstein's Harlem Globetrotters baseball team.

==== Chicago American Giants ====
Gulley joined the American Giants late in the 1946 season for a barnstorming tour with the Chicago Brown Bombers, but did not appear in any league games with the club.

==== Newark Eagles ====
Gulley joined the Newark Eagles in 1947. In Newark, Gulley appeared in 3 recorded league contests, losing 2 of them.

=== Minor Leagues ===
==== Seattle Steelheads ====
Following his release from the Buckeyes, Gulley pitched for the Globetrotters. When the Globetrotters rebranded as the Seattle Steelheads in the West Coast Negro Baseball Association in 1946, Gulley remained with the club.

==== Barnstorming ====
After leaving the Steelheads for the Chicago American Giants a month into the 1946 season, he would later reappear with the Cincinnati Crescents, the next evolution of the Steelheads after their league folded. Gulley continued to appear sporadically with numerous teams including the Detroit Senators, Kansas City Royals, and the (rebranded again) Globetrotters. He also teamed up with other Black major leaguers and prospects in 1948, touring the country with the Jackie Robinson All-Stars. While barnstorming, Gulley played outfield on days he wasn't pitching.

===== Car accident =====
While on the road with the Senators in 1947, Gulley was injured along with 5 teammates when their bus experienced a brake system failure collided with a shed in Covington, Kentucky. Gulley was treated and released at a local hospital for lacerations on his hands and legs.

==== Mexican League ====
In 1948, Gulley was recruited with a number of Americans to play in the integrated Mexican League. He spent 1948 with the Alijadores de Tampico. In 1949, Gulley split time between Tuneros de San Luis Potosi and Diablos Rojos del Mexico.

==== Canada ====
Following his time in Mexico, Gulley moved North to the independent Provincial League in 1949, splitting the season between the Farmham Pirates and St. Jean Braves.

==== Chicago American Giants ====
in addition to his time in Mexico and Canada, Gulley rejoined the Chicago American Giants in 1949, now considered a minor league level team.

==== Brooklyn Dodgers organization ====
In 1950, Gulley caught the eye of the Brooklyn Dodgers and was signed to a minor league contract. He was assigned to the Class C Santa Barbara Dodgers of the California League but never played a game with them due to alleged verbal abuse by manager Bill Hart. He then retired for 90 days on the recommendation of minor league president George Trautman, making him free to sign with any club he wanted.

==== Visalia Cubs ====
Gulley then signed with the Visalia Cubs, also in the California League. With Visalia, he transitioned to the outfield full time and hit .292 in his first season. Gulley became a mainstay and fan favorite and remained with the Cubs through 1952, then rejoining them in 1954.

==== Victoria Tyees ====
In 1953, Gulley moved up to the Class A Victoria Tyees, hitting .270 in only 28 games.

==== Spokane Indians ====
In 1955 he joined the Class B Spokane Indians of the Northwest League, hitting .361 and driving in 126 RBI.

==== Salinas Packers ====
Gulley returned to California and played with the Salinas Packers, a Milwaukee Braves affiliate, in 1956. During a game against the Fresno Cardinals, Gulley fractured his wrist after he was hit by a pitch. The injury effectively ended his career in baseball.

== Career highlights ==
- In 1946, Gulley pitched a no-hit, no-run game against a team of major and minor league all-stars at San Diego.
- Gulley led the 1952 California League in doubles with 43.

== Pitching style ==
While pitching, Gulley was known for his fastball, though his "out pitch" was an overhand drop curveball.

== Life after baseball ==
After retiring from baseball, Gulley moved to Chicago and opened a graphic arts business. In 1998, Gulley was honored by the Milwaukee Brewers and added to their Negro League Wall of Fame at County Stadium, later moved to Miller Park.

== Death and legacy ==
He died in Skokie, Illinois, in 1999 at age 74. In 2019, Gulley was posthumously elected to the Union County, Arkansas Sports Hall of Fame.
