= Earl Ashby =

Cuban baseball player (born 1921)

- Catcher / Outfielder
- Born: May 16, 1921; Havana, Cuba
- Batted: Right Threw: Right

Negro league baseball debut
- 1945, for the Cleveland Buckeyes

Last appearance
- 1950, for the St. Jean Braves
- Stats at Baseball Reference

Teams
- Cleveland Buckeyes (1945); Homestead Grays (1947); New York Cubans (1948); Newark Eagles (1948); Drummondville Cubs (1950); St. Jean Braves (1950)

Earl Randolph Ashby Powbett (born May 16, 1921) is a Cuban former professional baseball catcher and outfielder in the Negro leagues. He played professionally from 1945 to 1950. Ashby played with the Cleveland Buckeyes, Birmingham Black Barons, Homestead Grays, New York Cubans and the Newark Eagles. He also played in the Provincial League in 1950 with the Drummondville Cubs and the St. Jean Braves.

In June 1955, Ashby Powbett was released from his contract due to "disciplinary reasons". In July, he was a material witness to a manslaughter case in Rochester, New York.
