= Stade Canac =

Stadium in Quebec City, Canada

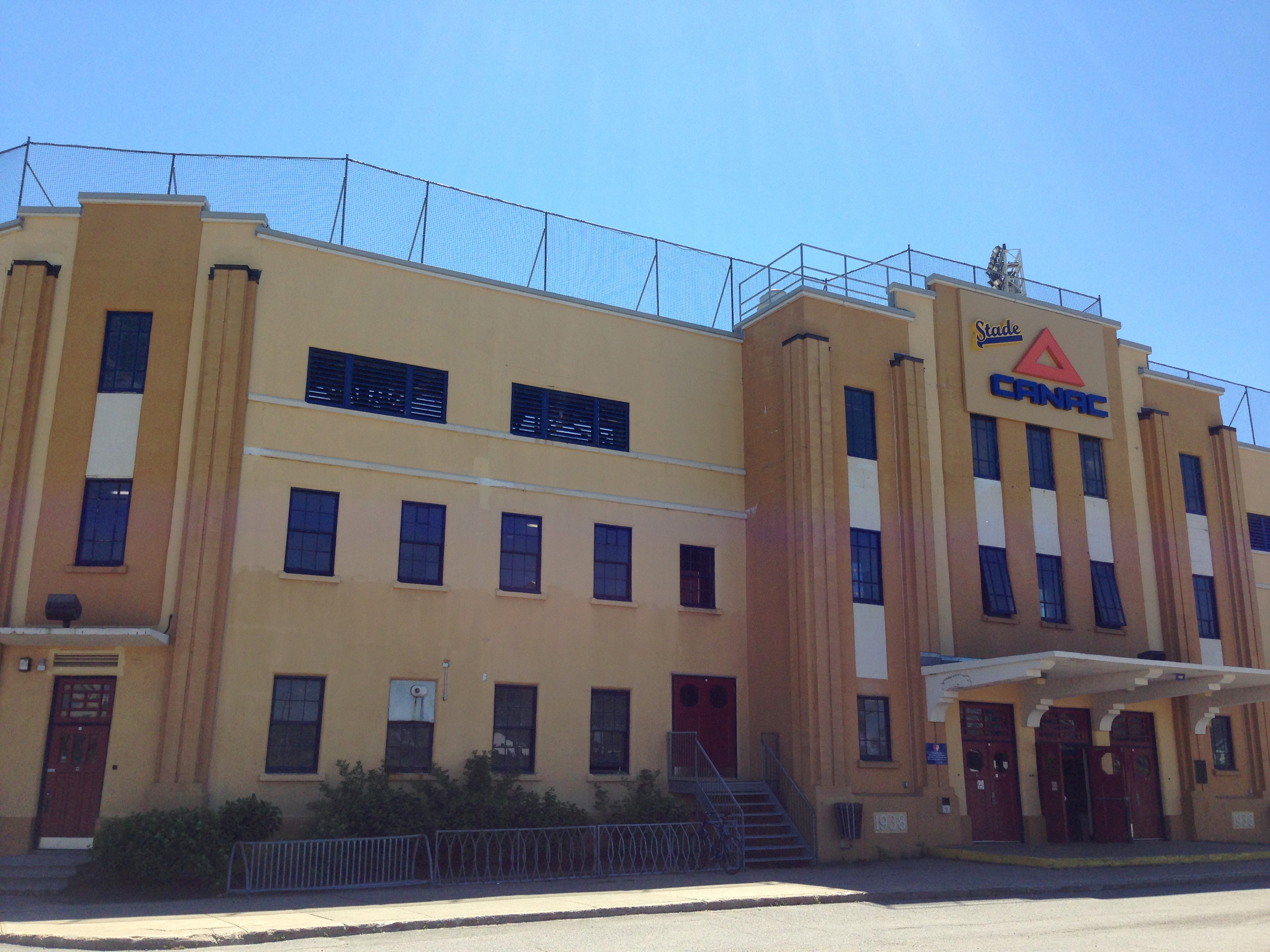

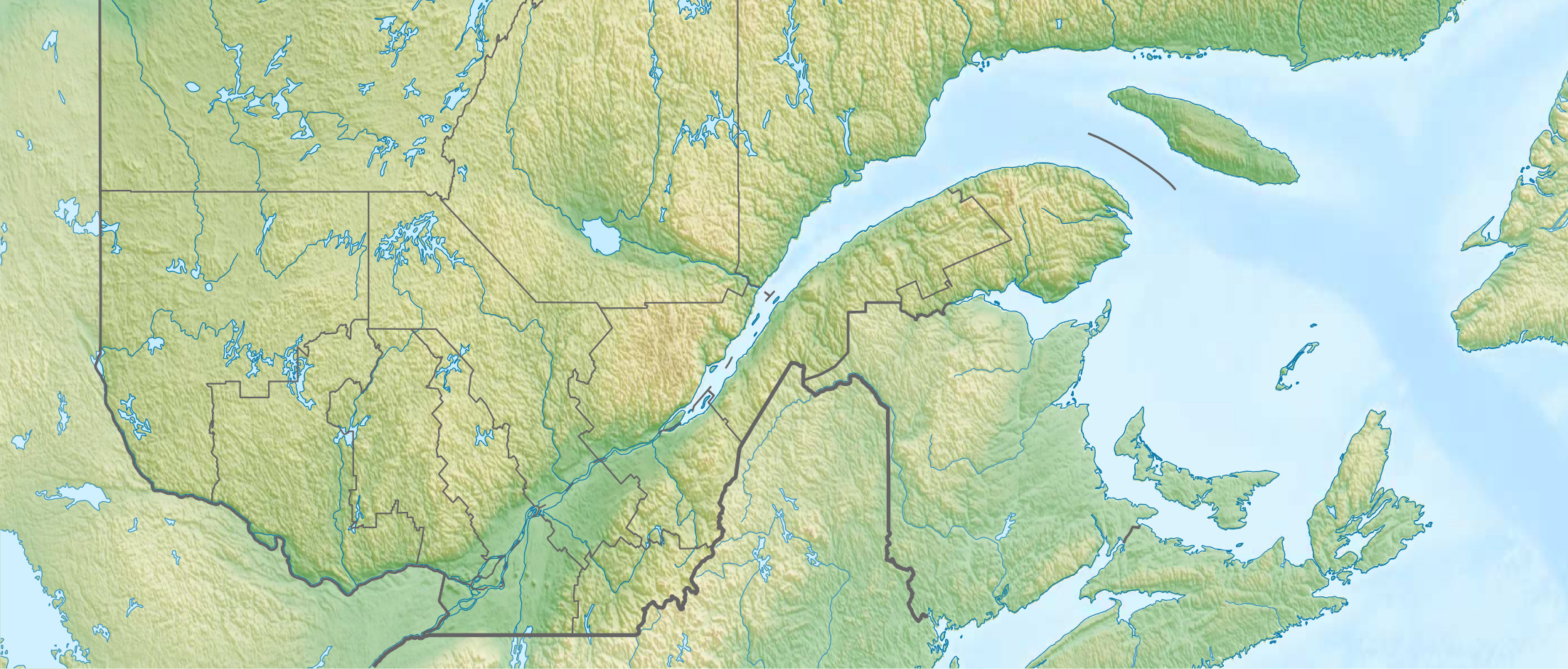
- Location within Quebec South Location within Quebec Location within Canada
- Interactive map of Stade Canac
- Former names: Stade Municipal de Québec (1939–2016)
- Location: 100 Cardinal Maurice-Roy Street; Quebec City, Quebec, Canada G1K 8Z1
- Coordinates: 46°49′7″N 71°14′0.59″W
- Owner: City of Quebec
- Operator: Canac
- Capacity: 4,600 (1939–1999); 4,287 (1999–2022); 4,297 (2022–present)
- Surface: Grass (1939–2016); Synthetic (2017–present)
- Record attendance: Baseball: 5,354 (June 13, 2009); Concerts: 7,000 (September 11, 2019)
- Field size: Left field: 315 ft (96 m); Centre field: 375 ft (114 m); Right field: 315 ft (96 m)

Construction
- Groundbreaking: April 1, 1938
- Opened: May 14, 1939
- Renovated: 1998–1999, 2016–2017, 2020, 2022, 2025–present

Tenants
- Quebec Athletics (Quebec Provincial League/Can-Am) (1939–1942); Quebec Alouettes (Can-Am) (1946–1948); Quebec Braves (Can-Am/Provincial League) (1949–1955); Quebec Indiens (Mauricie League/Provincial League) (1957–1970); Québec Carnavals (EL) (1971–1975); Quebec Metros (EL) (1976–1977); Québec Diamants (Quebec Junior Elite Baseball League) (1995–2011, 2014–present); Québec Capitales (NAPB) (1999–present); Québec Jr. Capitales (Quebec Junior Elite Baseball League) (2012–2013)

Stade Canac is a baseball stadium in Quebec City, Quebec that is currently the home of the Québec Capitales of the National Association of Professional Baseball (NAPB). Originally opened in 1939, it has a seating capacity of 4,297 and is located within the boundaries of Parc Victoria, a municipal park and recreation area located between the St-Roch district of Quebec City and the south shore of the Saint-Charles River.

The ballpark is often informally referred to as simply "Parc Victoria" by local residents even though the field only occupies about a quarter of the park's total area. Modest in capacity relative to the size of the city's population, it has been well-attended during Capitales home games.

== History ==
=== Construction ===
In 1937, then-Premier of Quebec, Maurice Duplessis, a baseball fan, was invited to throw out the ceremonial first pitch of the Quebec Provincial League season in Trois-Rivières. During his visit, he noticed how severely damaged the stadium had become and decided to allow public funding to be used for the construction of new sport facilities in many Quebec cities. By doing so, he also wanted to create thousands of new jobs during a period of economic struggles.

In 1938, following a demand by a group representing the Quebec Athletics, the government agreed to build a new baseball stadium in Quebec City and in early April 1938, construction work began in Parc Victoria. The stadium would be completed a few months later at the end of the 1938 baseball season.

=== Early years (1939–1956) ===
On May 14, 1939, a first baseball game was held at the new stadium. Then-mayor of Quebec City, Lucien Borne, was in attendance, which saw more than 5,000 people attend that game with the Athletics winning their first game at the stadium 6-5 against Trois-Rivières. The first Quebec player to hit a home run at Stade Municipal de Québec was Roland Gladu who would go on to play in the Majors for the Boston Braves in 1944. In 1941, the Athletics joined the Canadian–American League and became an affiliate of the Brooklyn Dodgers. From 1943 through 1945, baseball was not played at the stadium due to World War II.

After the end of the war baseball was once again played at Stade Municipal de Québec.

Under new ownership, the Athletics were renamed the Alouettes. They became an affiliate of the Chicago Cubs in 1946 and of the New York Giants in 1948. However, from 1946 to 1948, the Alouettes were not successful on the field, finishing last every year.

In 1948, the Alouettes were sold to businessman Ulysse Ste-Marie. Wanting to get his newly acquired team back on track, he began by changing the team's name to the Quebec Braves. Ste-Marie also hired a new manager for his team, Frank McCormick, a former 9-time MLB All-Star for the Cincinnati Reds. During his first year as their manager, the Braves won 90 games, 34 more than the previous year, and clinched the 1949 Canadian–American League pennant, however McCormick quit the team after only one year.

For the 1950 season, Ste-Marie hired a new manager to replace McCormick, George McQuinn, another former MLB All-Star and for a second straight year the Braves won the Canadian–American League championship. That 1950 Braves squad are still considered today as one of the best minor league teams of all time.

In 1951, the Braves quit the Canadian–American League to join the Provincial League, becoming an affiliate of the Boston Braves/Milwaukee Braves.

On July 15, 1953, with Warren Spahn as their starting pitcher, Milwaukee played an exhibition game against Quebec at Stade Municipal de Québec. Two years later, on May 31, 1955, Milwaukee came to Stade Municipal de Québec to play another exhibition game. This time, they had baseball legend Hank Aaron in their lineup where Aaron was the only player to hit a home run during that game.

In 1955, the Provincial League and the Quebec Braves ceased operations. During their seven year-existence, the Braves were considered a dynasty winning a total of six championships.

=== Quebec Indiens (1957–1970) ===
In 1957, Quebec City found itself without a professional baseball team as the Minor Leagues in North America were going through a tough time. However, Hugues Beaudoin, a Quebec City resident, founded a new team, the Quebec Indiens. With only amateur players from Quebec in its lineup, the Indiens played their first seasons in the Mauricie League. A few years later, they joined a new version of the Provincial League. During their final year in 1970, the Indiens' lineup was made up of only professional American and Latino players.

Throughout the years, the Quebec Indiens won a total of three championships (1960, 1964, 1969).

=== Quebec Carnavals/Metros (1971–1977) ===
In 1969, the Montreal Expos joined Major League Baseball and became the first non-American major baseball team. Two years later, in 1971, they established their Double-A affiliate in Quebec, where the team was named the Québec Carnavals in honour of the famous Carnaval de Québec. After a difficult inaugural season, the Carnavals finished the 1972 season with a 75-64 record, just 2½ games behind the Trois-Rivières Aigles while breaking the existing attendance record for the Eastern League with a total admissions of 142,818 people throughout their season.

In 1973, future Baseball Hall of Fame catcher Gary Carter joined the team and would go on to finish the season with 15 home runs while producing a total of 68 runs batted in. During that same campaign, Quebec City fans were also introduced to another future Expos All-Star player, pitcher Steve Rogers.

The 1974 season was exceptional for the Carnavals. They managed to clinch their division pennant and five of their outfielders would go on to play in Major League Baseball, Warren Cromartie, Jesus Bombo Rivera, Tony Scott, Ellis Valentine and Jerry White.

In 1975, the Carnavals began to experience extreme financial struggles at which François Bonetto became the new team owner and changed the team's name, as the Québec Carnavals became the Quebec Metros.

During the 1976 campaign, young rising star Andre Dawson played in only 40 games in Quebec City, although his impressive performance (.357 AVG, 8 HR, 27 RBI) quickly saw him promoted to the Expos Triple-A affiliate, the Denver Bears, of the Pacific Coast League.

At the end of the 1977 season, the Montreal Expos moved their Double-A affiliate to Memphis, Tennessee, and became known as the Chicks.

=== Dark years (1978–1998) ===
For two decades, the stadium was only used for junior baseball and became heavily damaged. In the 1990s, the stadium was in such bad shape the city council strongly considered demolishing it, however, a group of citizens formed the Comité de Relance in a desperate effort to save the facility. Only minor work would be done by that committee to repair some parts of the aging stadium. Even though the demolition of the building was avoided, a private investor was desperately needed in order to justify some investments by the city.

In 1998, Jean-François Côté who had been promoting the return of professional baseball in Quebec City for a few years already, managed to invite Miles Wolff, the editor of Baseball America, to visit the stadium. Due to the very bad condition of the structure, Wolff did not see any potential for any future professional baseball at this location.

=== Renovation and baseball comeback (1999–2015) ===
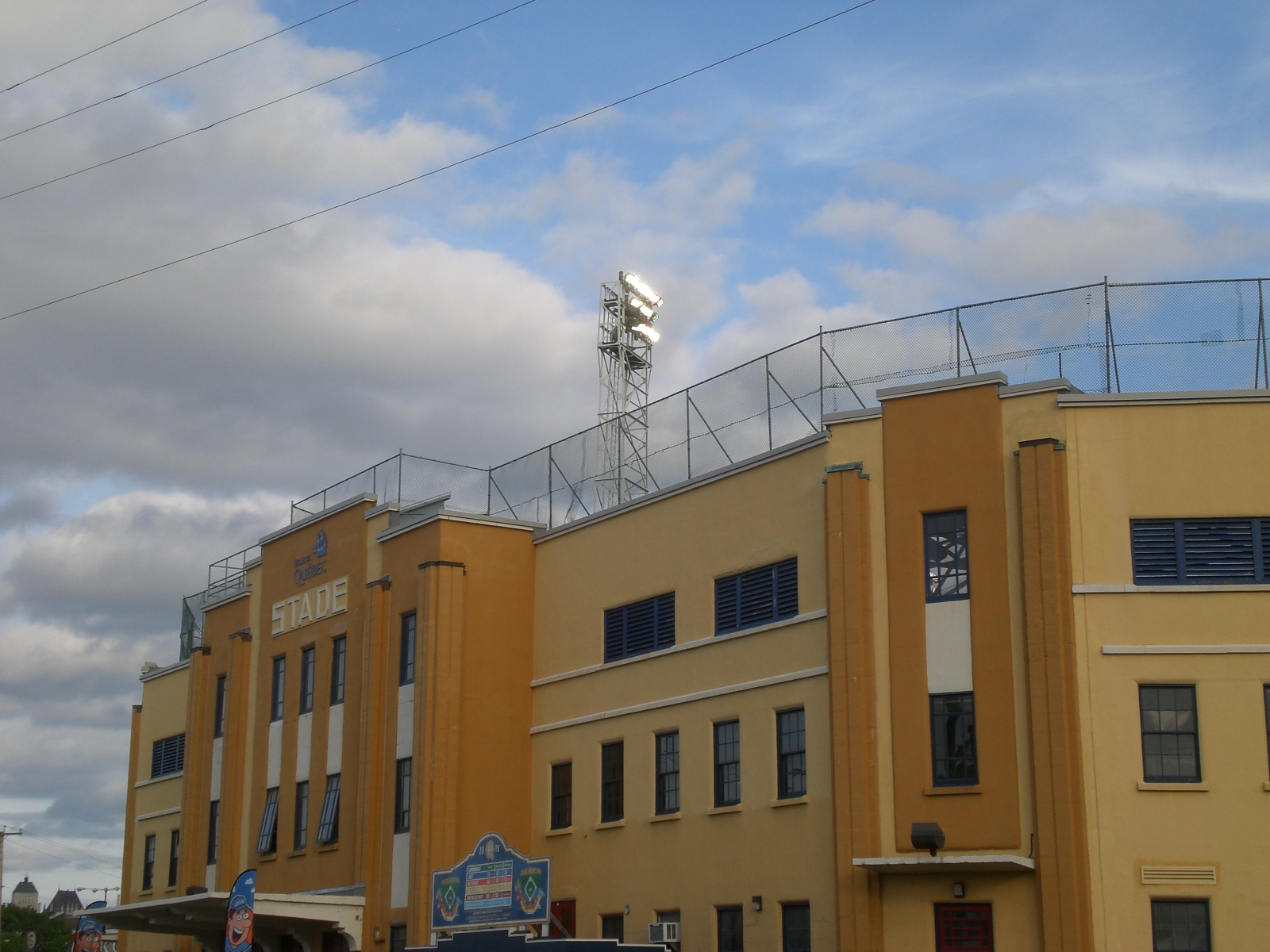
The front of the stadium in 2013

Following the disappointment of Wolff's visit, the city spent the next 6 months renovating the old facility after which Wolff was invited once again to visit the stadium at which time his reaction after that second visit in Quebec City was very favorable.

On June 4, 1999, the Québec Capitales, a new professional baseball team, played their first home game at the stadium in front of a crowd of 4,743 and since then, the city has continued to invest important amounts of money to modernize the stadium while keeping its historic side.

=== Complexe de Baseball Victoria (CBV) Management (2016–present) ===
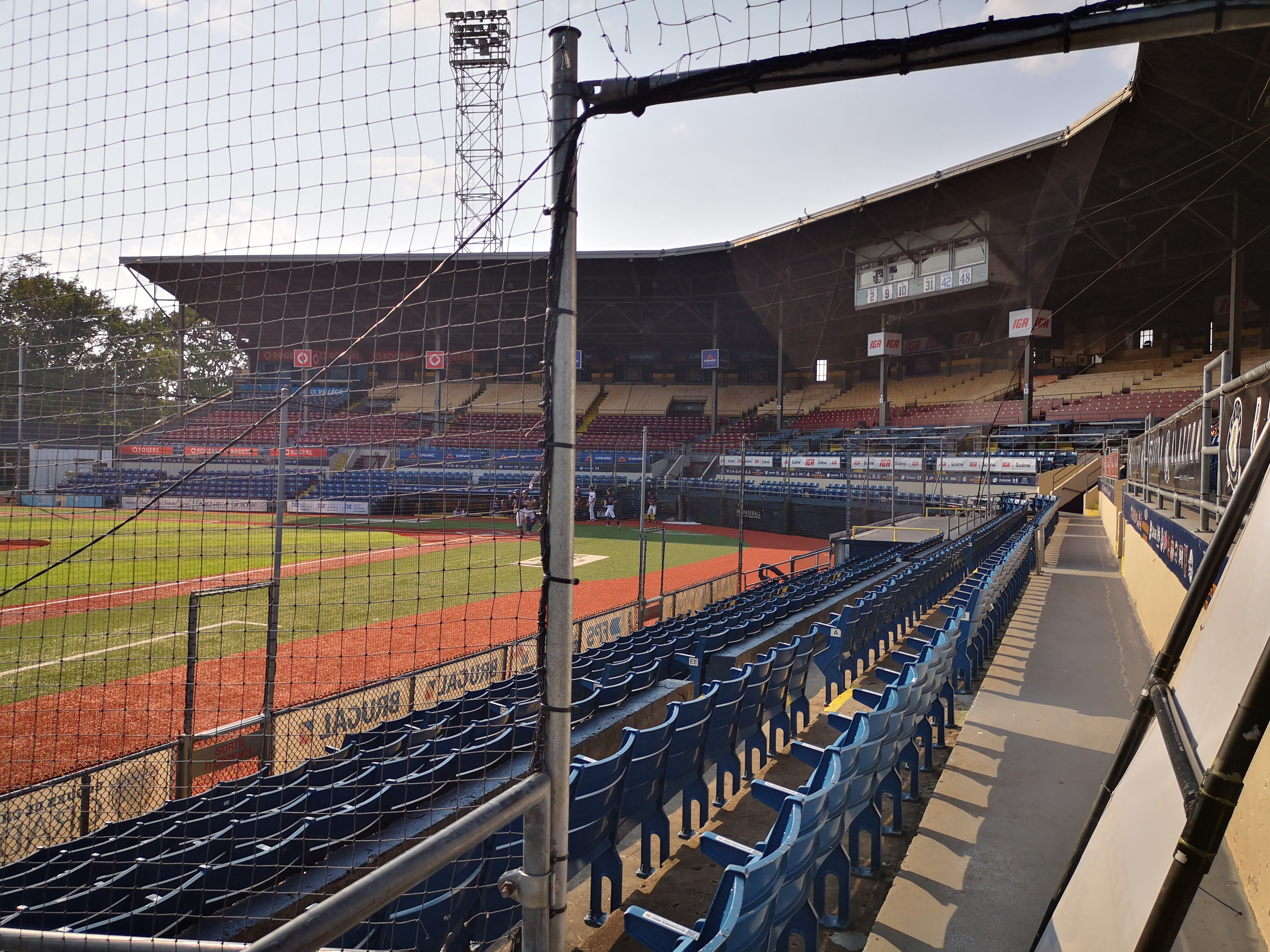
The grandstands in 2023

In October 2016, a group named Complexe de Baseball Victoria (CBV) officially took over management of the stadium from the city. An estimated 3.3 M$ was slated to be invested to install a synthetic field and fences which can be moved to create 2-3 smaller fields.

The deal between the city and CBV also allowed them to sell the stadium naming rights. In late 2016, a partnership agreement was reached between CBV and Groupe Laberge, owner of the hardware retail chain Canac, to rename the stadium to Stade Canac starting at the 2017 season.

== Retired numbers ==
Stade Canac retired numbers
No.	Player	Position	Team	Years	Date Retired	Notes
8	Gary Carter	C	Québec Carnavals/Montréal Expos	1973–84 1992	July 31, 1993	Retired by the Montréal Expos Not officially retired by the Capitales
9	Jean-Philippe Roy	SS	Québec Diamants	1995–99 2008–11	July 25, 2013	Retired by the Québec Diamants Player (1995–99), manager (2008–11)
18	Sébastien Boucher	CF	Québec Capitales	2009–2014	August 18, 2024	
31	Eddie Lantigua	1B	Québec Capitales	1999–2009	June 17, 2010	
34	Karl Gélinas	P	Québec Capitales	2007–2019	July 27, 2024	
42	Jackie Robinson	2B	Brooklyn Dodgers	1947–56	April 15, 1997	Retired by Major League Baseball Not officially retired by the Capitales

Events and tenants
Preceded by CanWest Global Park	Host of the NoL All-Star Game; Stade Municipal de Québec; 2002	Succeeded by Haymarket Park
