= List of professional sports teams in Saskatchewan =

Saskatchewan is the sixth-most populated province in Canada.

== Active teams ==
=== Major league teams ===
Saskatchewan is home to one major professional sports team, who play in Regina.

Canadian football
| League | Team | City | Arena | Capacity |
| CFL | Saskatchewan Roughriders | Regina | Mosaic Stadium | 33,350 |

=== Other professional sports teams ===
Lacrosse
| League | Team | City | Stadium | Capacity |
| NLL | Saskatchewan Rush | Saskatoon | SaskTel Centre | 15,195 |
Basketball
| League | Team | City | Arena | Capacity |
| CEBL | Saskatoon Mamba | Saskatoon | SaskTel Centre; Merlis Belsher Place | 5,898; 2,700 |

=== Map of cities with a professional sports team ===
Location with a professional sports team

== See also ==
- Professional sports in Canada
- List of professional sports teams in Canada by city
