= Simon Després =

Canadian ice hockey player (born 1991)

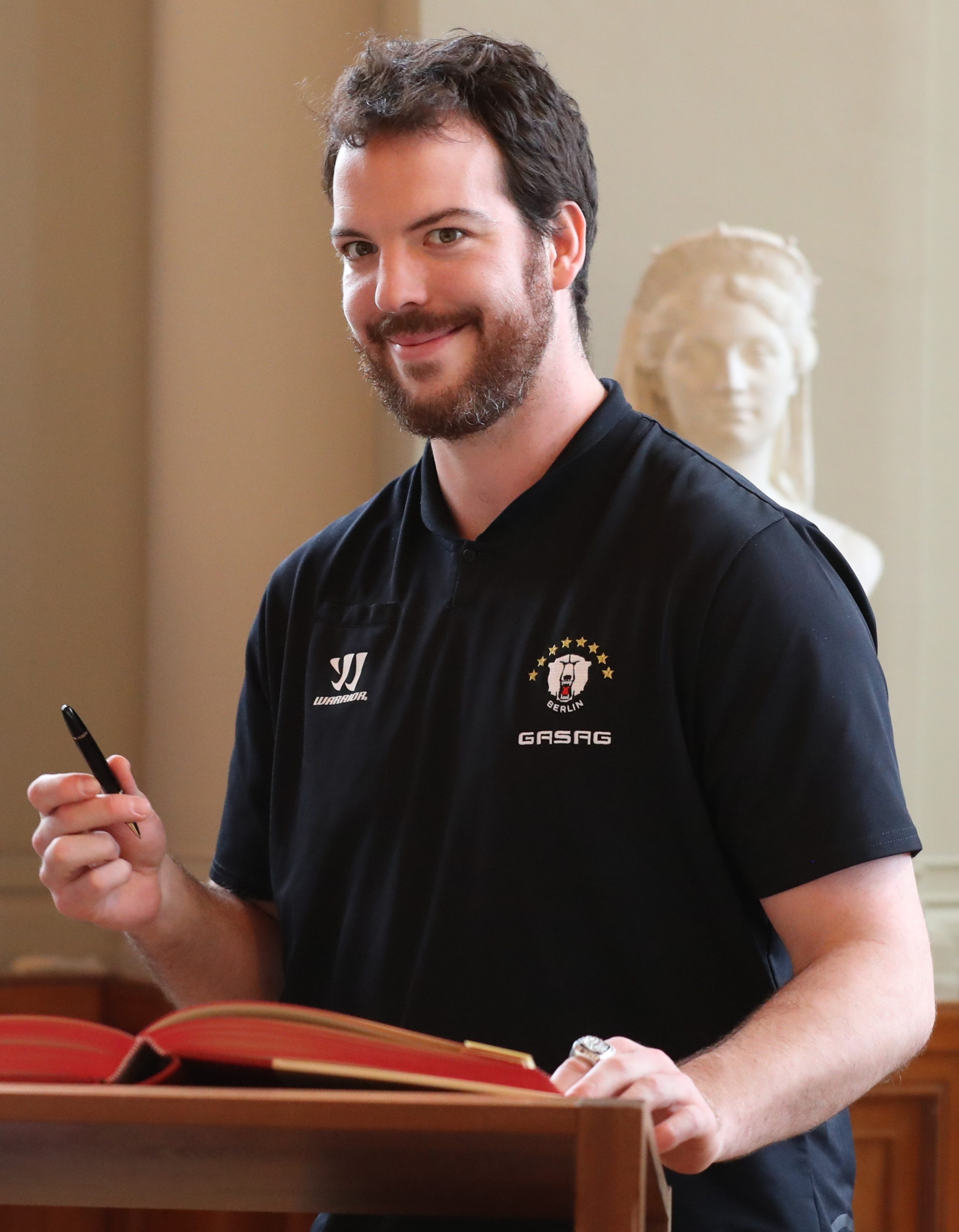
- Després in 2022
- Born: July 27, 1991 (age 35) Laval, Quebec, Canada
- Height: 6 ft 4 in (193 cm)
- Weight: 218 lb (99 kg; 15 st 8 lb)
- Position: Defence
- Shoots: Left
- AIHL team Former teams: Melbourne Ice; Pittsburgh Penguins; Anaheim Ducks; HC Slovan Bratislava; Kölner Haie; IK Oskarshamn; Eisbären Berlin; EC VSV; Nottingham Panthers; Glasgow Clan; Saint-Hyacinthe Bataillon; Fife Flyers
- NHL draft: 30th overall, 2009; Pittsburgh Penguins
- Playing career: 2011–present

Simon Després (born July 27, 1991) is a Canadian professional ice hockey defenceman who is currently playing with Melbourne Ice of the Australian Ice Hockey League (AIHL). He was drafted in the first round, 30th overall, in the 2009 NHL entry draft by the Pittsburgh Penguins and has also played for the Anaheim Ducks. During a game in 2015, he suffered a severe concussion that complicated his career due to recurring symptoms, forcing him to miss nearly all Ducks games to follow; out of concern for his condition, the Ducks bought him out. He later signed with HC Slovan Bratislava of the Kontinental Hockey League, before attempting to return to the NHL via the Montreal Canadiens who assigned him to the Rocket, their AHL affiliate.

== Playing career ==
As a youth, Després played in the 2004 Quebec International Pee-Wee Hockey Tournament with a minor ice hockey team from Laval, Quebec.

=== Amateur ===
Després began his major junior ice hockey career with the Quebec Major Junior Hockey League (QMJHL)'s Saint John Sea Dogs, who acquired Després with the first overall selection at the 2007 QMJHL Entry Draft. He scored his first QMJHL goal on September 23, 2007, against the Lewiston Maineiacs. After two seasons of play, Després was rated as the top professional prospect in the QMJHL by several scouting bureaus and media outlets in anticipation of the 2009 NHL entry draft (June 26–27 in Montreal). On June 26, 2009, he was drafted 30th overall in the NHL Entry Draft by the League's recently crowned Stanley Cup champions, the Pittsburgh Penguins.

Remaining with Saint John for the 2009–10 season, Després appeared in 63 games, scoring nine goals and 47 points, as the Sea Dogs had a League-best 109 points. He helped the Sea Dogs reach the President's Cup finals, though Saint John lost to the Moncton Wildcats in six games. In 21 playoff games, he had two goals and 19 points.

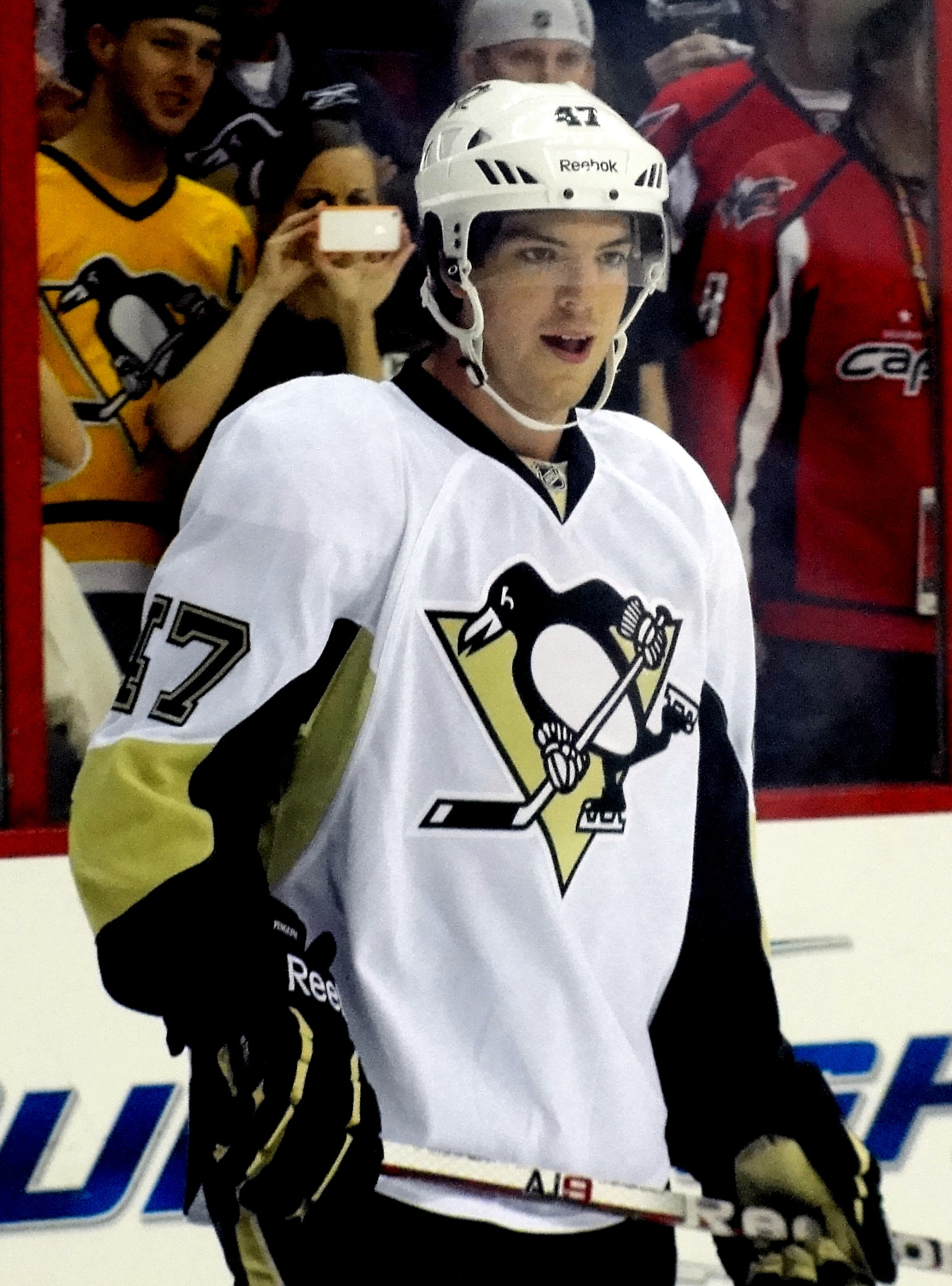
Després making his NHL debut against the Washington Capitals, December 2011.

In 2010–11, Després was limited to 47 games, but increased his goal scoring output to 13 goals, on his way to recording 41 points and winning the Emile Bouchard Trophy as the QMJHL's best defenceman. After helping Team Canada win silver in 2011 World Junior Ice Hockey Championships, Després and the Sea Dogs capped off their season by winning the President's Cup on their way to a Memorial Cup championship victory.

=== Professional ===
Després played his first career NHL game on December 1, 2011, with the Penguins against the Washington Capitals. He earned his first NHL point on an assist on Chris Kunitz's goal; he also posted a +2 plus-minus rating on the night. Després' scored his first career NHL goal on December 17, 2011, against Ryan Miller of the Buffalo Sabres.

Després made his Stanley Cup playoff debut on April 18, 2012, against the Philadelphia Flyers, logging 11:22 of ice time and finishing with a +2 plus-minus rating. On the night, Després became the first-ever Saint John Sea Dogs alumnus to play in a Stanley Cup playoff game. One day after Pittsburgh was eliminated from the 2012 playoffs by the Flyers, he was reassigned to the team's American Hockey League (AHL) affiliate, the Wilkes-Barre/Scranton Penguins, on April 23 to participate in their run in the 2012 Calder Cup playoffs.

On March 2, 2015, Després was traded to the Anaheim Ducks in exchange for defenceman Ben Lovejoy. Després scored his first career Stanley Cup playoff goal on May 22 against Corey Crawford of the Chicago Blackhawks in the 2015 Western Conference Finals. The goal, the eventual game-winner in a 2–1 Ducks victory, was assisted by teammates Ryan Getzlaf and Cam Fowler.

On October 16, 2015, Després suffered a concussion as a result of an illegal hit from Colorado Avalanche defenceman Tyson Barrie. Després missed 42 games to follow, while Barrie was suspended for three. In the 2016–17 season, Després featured in the opening game against the Dallas Stars before recurring concussion symptoms ruled him out from the remainder of the season. With his future uncertain because of his medical history, and due to salary cap constraints, the Anaheim Ducks opted to buy-out the remaining three years of his contract on June 16, 2017. With the remainder of his contract valued at US $15.9 million, he will only be paid $5.3 million of it over the next eight seasons.

In August 2017, it was announced that Després had signed a one-year contract to play in the KHL as a member of HC Slovan Bratislava. The decision will alleviate the Ducks' salary cap concerns regarding his buyout. In the 2017–18 season, Després returned to health and gradually increased his ice-time with Bratislava, registering 4 goals and 11 points in 44 games.

As a free agent, Després was offered an attempt of a comeback to the NHL, in accepting an invitation to the Montreal Canadiens training camp on July 12, 2018. In the midst of the 2018–19 season, Després agreed to a professional try-out contract with the Canadiens AHL affiliate, the Laval Rocket, on December 3, 2018. He appeared in 5 games, posting 1 goal and 2 points, over the following month for Laval. At the conclusion of his try-out with Laval, Després rejected a contract offer to remain with the club and was released on January 3, 2019. Després returned to play a month later, returning to Europe in signing for the remainder of the season with German club, Kölner Haie of the Deutsche Eishockey Liga (DEL), on February 11, 2019.

On July 5, 2019, Després extended his career in Europe, agreeing to a one-year contract with newly promoted Swedish club, IK Oskarshamn of the SHL.

After spells with Eisbären Berlin and EC VSV, Després moved to the UK to sign for Nottingham Panthers in November 2023.

In June 2024, Després moved from Nottingham to fellow EIHL side Glasgow Clan.

In November 2025, Després signed for EIHL side Fife Flyers.

In June 2026, Després signed for AIHL side Melbourne Ice.

== Career statistics ==
=== Regular season and playoffs ===
			Regular season					Playoffs
Season	Team	League	GP	G	A	Pts	PIM	GP	G	A	Pts	PIM
2006–07	Laval-Bourassa Rousseau	QMAAA	42	8	31	39	36	5	0	2	2	8
2007–08	Saint John Sea Dogs	QMJHL	64	1	13	14	30	14	0	4	4	18
2008–09	Saint John Sea Dogs	QMJHL	66	2	30	32	74	4	0	4	4	2
2009–10	Saint John Sea Dogs	QMJHL	63	9	38	47	87	21	2	17	19	18
2010–11	Saint John Sea Dogs	QMJHL	47	13	28	41	54	19	4	8	12	16
2011–12	Wilkes-Barre/Scranton Penguins	AHL	44	5	10	15	45	10	1	1	2	2
2011–12	Pittsburgh Penguins	NHL	18	1	3	4	10	3	0	0	0	2
2012–13	Wilkes-Barre/Scranton Penguins	AHL	27	4	3	7	28	—	—	—	—	—
2012–13	Pittsburgh Penguins	NHL	33	2	5	7	20	3	0	0	0	0
2013–14	Wilkes-Barre/Scranton Penguins	AHL	36	6	16	22	39	17	2	7	9	32
2013–14	Pittsburgh Penguins	NHL	34	0	5	5	26	—	—	—	—	—
2014–15	Pittsburgh Penguins	NHL	59	2	15	17	64	—	—	—	—	—
2014–15	Anaheim Ducks	NHL	16	1	5	6	22	16	1	6	7	6
2015–16	Anaheim Ducks	NHL	32	0	4	4	8	7	0	0	0	6
2015–16	San Diego Gulls	AHL	4	1	1	2	6	—	—	—	—	—
2016–17	Anaheim Ducks	NHL	1	0	0	0	0	—	—	—	—	—
2017–18	HC Slovan Bratislava	KHL	44	4	7	11	84	—	—	—	—	—
2018–19	Laval Rocket	AHL	5	1	1	2	4	—	—	—	—	—
2018–19	Kölner Haie	DEL	7	0	3	3	6	10	1	3	4	43
2019–20	IK Oskarshamn	SHL	41	4	13	17	55	—	—	—	—	—
2020–21	Eisbären Berlin	DEL	19	3	7	10	14	9	1	4	5	6
2021–22	Eisbären Berlin	DEL	52	2	17	19	23	11	0	2	2	12
2022–23	EC VSV	Austria	43	3	12	15	26	5	0	0	0	4
2023–24	Nottingham Panthers	EIHL	44	2	10	12	24	-	-	-	-	-
2024–25	Glasgow Clan	EIHL	52	6	23	29	63	2	0	0	0	2
2025–26	Saint-Hyacinthe Bataillon	LNAH	9	0	2	2	8	-	-	-	-	-
2025–26	Fife Flyers	EIHL	41	1	10	11	47	-	-	-	-	-
NHL totals			193	6	37	43	150	29	1	6	7	14

Medal record

Representing Canada

Ice hockey

World Junior Championships
Silver medal – second place	2011 Buffalo	

=== International ===
Year	Team	Event	Result	GP	G	A	Pts	PIM
2008	Canada Quebec	U17	7th	5	0	0	0	10
2008	Canada	IH18	1st place, gold medalist(s)	4	2	0	2	8
2009	Canada	WJC18	4th	6	0	2	2	8
2011	Canada	WJC	2nd place, silver medalist(s)	7	0	3	3	0
Junior totals				22	2	5	7	26

== Awards and honours ==
Award	Year
QMJHL
All-Rookie Team	2008
CHL Top Prospects Game	2009
First All-Star Team	2011
Emile Bouchard Trophy	2011
President's Cup (Saint John Sea Dogs)	2011
Memorial Cup	2011
DEL
Champion (Eisbären Berlin)	2021

Awards and achievements
Preceded by Angelo Esposito	Pittsburgh Penguins first-round draft pick 2009	Succeeded by Beau Bennett
