= List of professional sports teams in Nova Scotia =

Nova Scotia is the seventh-most populated province in Canada and has a rich history of professional sports. All professional sports teams in the province reside in the metropolitan area of Halifax.

== Active teams ==
Lacrosse
League	Team	City	Arena	Capacity
NLL	Halifax Thunderbirds	Halifax	Scotiabank Centre	10,595
Soccer
League	Team	City	Stadium	Capacity
CPL	HFX Wanderers FC	Halifax	Wanderers Grounds	7,500
NSL	Halifax Tides FC	Halifax	Wanderers Grounds	7,500

=== Map of cities with a professional sports team ===
Location with a professional sports team

== Former professional teams ==
Basketball
League	Team	City	Years
WBL	Halifax Windjammers	Halifax	1991–1992
NBL	Cape Breton Breakers	Sydney	1993–1994
NBL	Halifax Windjammers	Halifax	1992–1994
NBL-C	Cape Breton Highlanders	Sydney	2016–2019
NBL-C	Halifax Rainmen	Halifax	2014–2015
NBL-C	Halifax Hurricanes	Halifax	2015–2021
ABA	Halifax Rainmen	Halifax	2007–2008
PBL	Halifax Rainmen	Halifax	2008–2011
TBL	Halifax Hoopers	Halifax	2024–2026
Ice Hockey
League	Team	City	Years
AHL	Cape Breton Oilers	Sydney	1988–1996
AHL	Halifax Citadels	Halifax	1988–1993
AHL	Nova Scotia Voyageurs	Halifax	1971–1984
AHL	Nova Scotia Oilers	Halifax	1984–1988
IPHL	Halifax Crescents	Halifax	1910–1911
IPHL	New Glasgow Cubs	New Glasgow	1910–1911
MaPHL	Halifax Crescents	Halifax	1911–1914
MaPHL	Halifax Socials	Halifax	1911–1914
MaPHL	New Glasgow Cubs	New Glasgow	1911–1913
MaPHL	New Glasgow Black Foxes	New Glasgow	1913–1914
MaPHL	Sydney Millionaires	Sydney	1912–1914
EPHL	Glace Bay Miners	Glace Bay	1914–1915
EPHL	New Glasgow Black Foxes	New Glasgow	1914–1915
EPHL	Sydney Millionaires	Sydney	1914–1915
Soccer
League	Team	City	Years
CSL	Nova Scotia Clippers	Halifax	1991

== See also ==
- Professional sports in Canada
- List of professional sports teams in Canada by city
