= Adrián Zabala =

Cuban baseball player (1916–2002)

- Pitcher
- Born: August 26, 1916; San Antonio de los Baños, Cuba
- Died: January 4, 2002 (aged 85); Jacksonville, Florida, U.S.
- Batted: Left Threw: Left

MLB debut
- August 11, 1945, for the New York Giants

Last MLB appearance
- September 24, 1949, for the New York Giants

MLB statistics
- Win–loss record: 4–7
- Earned run average: 5.02
- Strikeouts: 27
- Stats at Baseball Reference

Teams
- New York Giants (1945, 1949)

Adrián Zabala Rodríguez (August 26, 1916 – January 4, 2002) was a Cuban-born professional baseball pitcher. He played parts of two seasons in Major League Baseball for the New York Giants in 1945 and 1949. The 5 ft 11 in (1.80 m), 165 lb (75 kg) left-hander was a native of San Antonio de los Baños, Cuba.

== Amateur ball, minor leagues, and Cuban ball ==
Zabala played amateur baseball in Cuba in the mid-1930s, signing with the minor league Panama City Pelicans in 1937. He continued to play professionally in Cuba in the winter while pitching minor league ball independently, then with Jersey City, a Giants farm club. After serving with the Cuban Army in 1943–44, he returned to Jersey City in 1945, and was promoted to the majors in mid-season.

== First major league stint and suspension ==
Zabala made his major league debut on August 11, 1945, starting and winning 10–1 against the St. Louis Cardinals at the Polo Grounds. In 1946, Zabala jumped to the Mexican League and was suspended for five years. He pitched two seasons for the Pericos de Puebla, then joined the Sherbrooke Athletics of the Provincial League in 1948 while he awaited reinstatement. His suspension was lifted on June 5, 1949, allowing him to return to the Giants.

== Second major league stint ==
Perhaps his finest major league effort came on July 31, 1949, his first game back in New York since 1945. Zabala started the second game of a doubleheader against the Cincinnati Reds at Crosley Field and pitched a complete game shutout, winning 9–0. Zabala spent the rest of the season with the Giants, posting a 2–3 record with a 5.27 ERA in 15 games.

== Return to the minors ==
In 1950, Zabala was sent back to the minors, where he played with the Minneapolis Millers until 1953. He was then traded to the San Francisco Seals in October with two other players and cash for pitcher Windy McCall. In 1955, he joined the Jacksonville Braves, finishing his career there in 1956.

== Career overview ==
Zabala's MLB career totals include 26 games pitched, 4 wins, 7 losses, 9 starts, 3 complete games, 1 shutout, 8 games finished, and 1 save. He allowed 47 earned runs in 84.1 innings pitched, giving him an ERA of 5.02. Overall, he pitched professionally for twenty years.

== Death ==
Zabala died at the age of 85 in Jacksonville, Florida.
