= List of professional sports teams in Canada by city =

This article features a listing of the professional sports teams based in Canada organized by Census Metropolitan Area or Census Agglomeration. Canada has professional sports teams in eight sports across twenty-two leagues. Canadian teams compete in top-level American and Canadian-based leagues, including three of the four major professional sports leagues. Canada also has minor league teams competing in American and Canadian-based basketball, hockey, soccer, and baseball leagues.

Rank	CMA or CA	#	Football	Baseball	Basketball	Hockey	Soccer	Lacrosse	Ultimate
1	Toronto	16	Argonauts (CFL)	Blue Jays (MLB); Maple Leafs (CBL)	Raptors (NBA); Raptors 905 (G League); Shooting Stars (CEBL); Honey Badgers (CEBL); Tempo (WNBA)	Maple Leafs (NHL); Marlies (AHL); Sceptres (PWHL)	Toronto FC (MLS); Toronto FC II (MLS NP); Inter Toronto (CPL); AFC Toronto (NSL)		Rush (UFA)
2	Montreal	9	Alouettes (CFL)		Alliance (CEBL)	Canadiens (NHL); Rocket (AHL); Victoire (PWHL)	CF Montréal (MLS); FC Supra (CPL); Roses FC (NSL)		Royal (UFA)
3	Vancouver	10	Lions (CFL)	Canadians (NWL)	Bandits (CEBL)	Canucks (NHL); Goldeneyes (PWHL)	Whitecaps (MLS); Whitecaps FC 2 (MLS NP); Vancouver FC (CPL); Rise (NSL)	Warriors (NLL)	
4	Ottawa–Gatineau	7	Redblacks (CFL)	Titans (FL)	Blackjacks (CEBL)	Senators (NHL); Charge (PWHL)	Atlético (CPL); Rapid (NSL)		
5	Calgary	7	Stampeders (CFL)		Surge (CEBL)	Flames (NHL); Wranglers (AHL)	Cavalry FC (Note: Cavalry FC play home matches at ATCO Field in Foothills County, which is not a part of any CMA or CA. However, the nearest CMA/CA to ATCO Field is the Calgary CMA.) (CPL); Wild (NSL)	Roughnecks (NLL)	
6	Edmonton	3	Elks (CFL)		Stingers (CEBL)	Oilers (NHL)			
7	Quebec City	1		Capitales (FL)					
8	Winnipeg	6	Blue Bombers (CFL)	Goldeyes (AAPB)	Sea Bears (CEBL)	Jets (NHL); Moose (AHL)	Ember (NSL)		
9	Hamilton	6	Tiger-Cats (CFL)	Cardinals (CBL)		Hammers (AHL); Havoc (PWHL)	Forge FC (CPL)	Rock (NLL)	
10	Kitchener–Cambridge–Waterloo	1		Panthers (CBL)					
11	London	1		Majors (CBL)					
12	Halifax	3					Wanderers (CPL); Tides (NSL)	Thunderbirds (NLL)	
13	St. Catharines–Niagara	2		Jackfish (CBL)	River Lions (CEBL)				
14	Windsor	1			Express (BSL)				
15	Oshawa	1						FireWolves (NLL)	
16	Victoria	1					Pacific FC (CPL)		
17	Saskatoon	2			Mamba (CEBL)			Rush (NLL)	
18	Regina	1	Roughriders (CFL)						
21	Barrie	1		Baycats (CBL)					
22	St. John's	1			Rogues (BSL)				
23	Abbotsford–Mission	1				Canucks (AHL)			
25	Greater Sudbury	1			Five (BSL)				
26	Guelph	1		Royals (CBL)					
28	Trois-Rivières	2		Aigles (FL)		Lions (ECHL)			
30	Brantford	1		Red Sox (CBL)					
38	Belleville	1				Senators (AHL)			
40	Chatham-Kent	1		Barnstormers (CBL)					

== See also ==
- List of American and Canadian cities by number of major professional sports franchises
- List of professional sports teams in the United States and Canada
  - List of professional sports teams in Alberta
  - List of professional sports teams in British Columbia
  - List of professional sports teams in Manitoba
  - List of professional sports teams in Nova Scotia
  - List of professional sports teams in Ontario
  - List of professional sports teams in Quebec
  - List of professional sports teams in Saskatchewan
