= List of professional sports teams in Manitoba =

Manitoba is the fifth-most populated province in Canada. All professional sports teams in the province reside in the major metropolitan area of Winnipeg.

== Active teams ==
=== Major league teams ===
Manitoba is home to two major professional sports teams. Both of the teams play in Winnipeg.

Canadian football
League	Team	City	Stadium	Capacity
CFL	Winnipeg Blue Bombers	Winnipeg	Princess Auto Stadium	32,343
Ice hockey
League	Team	City	Arena	Capacity
NHL	Winnipeg Jets	Winnipeg	Canada Life Centre	15,321

=== Other professional sports teams ===
==== Men's leagues ====
Baseball
League	Team	City	Stadium	Capacity
AA (Ind.)	Winnipeg Goldeyes	Winnipeg	Blue Cross Park	7,461
Basketball
League	Team	City	Arena	Capacity
CEBL	Winnipeg Sea Bears	Winnipeg	Canada Life Centre	15,321
Ice hockey
League	Team	City	Arena	Capacity
AHL	Manitoba Moose	Winnipeg	Canada Life Centre	15,321

==== Women's leagues ====
Soccer
League	Team	City	Stadium	Capacity
NSL	Winnipeg Ember FC	Winnipeg	Ralph Cantafio Soccer Complex	2,000 (planned 4,500)

=== Map of cities with a professional sports team ===
Location with a professional sports team

== Former teams ==
=== Major league teams ===
Ice hockey
League	Team	City	Years
WHA	Winnipeg Jets	Winnipeg	1972–79
NHL	Winnipeg Jets	Winnipeg	1979–96

=== Other former teams ===
Baseball
League	Team	City	Years
IL (AAA)	Winnipeg Whips	Winnipeg	1970–71
NoL 1902–71 (A/C/D/Ind.)	Brandon Angels	Brandon	1908
NoL 1902–71 (A/C/D/Ind.)	Brandon Greys	Brandon	1933
NoL 1902–71 (A/C/D/Ind.)	St. Boniface Bonnies	St. Boniface	1915
NoL 1902–71 (A/C/D/Ind.)	Winnipeg Maroons	Winnipeg	1902–05; 1908; 1913–17; 1933–42
NoL 1902–71 (A/C/D/Ind.)	Winnipeg Goldeyes	Winnipeg	1954–64; 1969
WCL (B/C/D)	Brandon Angels	Brandon	1909–11
WCL (B/C/D)	Winnipeg Maroons	Winnipeg	1909–11; 1919–21
CIL (C)	Winnipeg Maroons	Winnipeg	1912
NCCL (Ind.)	Winnipeg Maroons	Winnipeg	1906–07
NoL 1993–2010 (Ind.)	Winnipeg Goldeyes	Winnipeg	1994–2010
Man-Dak (Ind.)	Brandon Greys	Brandon	1950–54; 1957
Man-Dak (Ind.)	Carman Cardinals	Carman	1950–54
Man-Dak (Ind.)	Elmwood Giants	Winnipeg	1950–51
Man-Dak (Ind.)	Winnipeg Buffaloes	Winnipeg	1950–51
Man-Dak (Ind.)	Winnipeg Giants	Winnipeg	1952
Man-Dak (Ind.)	Winnipeg Royals	Winnipeg	1953
PL (Ind.)	Brandon Grey Owls	Brandon	1995–96
PL (Ind.)	West Manitoba Wranglers	Brandon	1997
Basketball
League	Team	City	Years
WBL	Winnipeg Thunder	Winnipeg	1992
NBL-C	Winnipeg Thunder	Winnipeg	1993–94
IBA	Winnipeg Cyclone	Winnipeg	1995–2001
Cricket
League	Team	City	Years
GT20	Winnipeg Hawks	Winnipeg	2018–19
Ice hockey
League	Team	City	Years
AHL	Manitoba Moose	Winnipeg	2001–11
IHL	Manitoba Moose	Winnipeg	1996–2001
WHL	Brandon Regals	Brandon	1955–57
WHL	Winnipeg Warriors	Winnipeg	1955–61
MPHL	Brandon Wheat City	Brandon	1906–08
MPHL	Portage la Prairie Cities	Portage la Prairie	1906–08
MPHL	Winnipeg Strathconas	Winnipeg	1906–08
MPHL	Winnipeg Maple Leafs	Winnipeg	1907–09
MPHL	Winnipeg Hockey Club	Winnipeg	1908–09
MPHL	Winnipeg Shamrocks	Winnipeg	1908–09
WWHL	Manitoba Maple Leafs	Winnipeg	2010–11
Soccer
League	Team	City	Years
CSL	Winnipeg Fury	Winnipeg	1987–92

== See also ==
- Professional sports in Canada
- List of professional sports teams in Canada by city
