= List of professional sports teams in Alberta =

Alberta is the fourth-most populated province in Canada. All professional sports teams in the province reside in the major metropolitan areas of Calgary and Edmonton.

== Active teams ==
=== Major league teams ===
Alberta is home to four major professional sports teams. Two of the teams play in Calgary and the other two play in Edmonton.

Canadian football
League	Team	City	Stadium	Capacity
CFL	Calgary Stampeders	Calgary	McMahon Stadium	35,400
CFL	Edmonton Elks	Edmonton	Commonwealth Stadium	56,302
Ice hockey
League	Team	City	Arena	Capacity
NHL	Calgary Flames	Calgary	Scotiabank Saddledome	19,289
NHL	Edmonton Oilers	Edmonton	Rogers Place	18,347

=== Other professional sports teams ===
Basketball
League	Team	City	Arena	Capacity
CEBL	Calgary Surge	Calgary	Winsport Arena	3,000
CEBL	Edmonton Stingers	Edmonton	Edmonton Expo Centre	4,200
Ice hockey
League	Team	City	Arena	Capacity
AHL	Calgary Wranglers	Calgary	Scotiabank Saddledome	19,289
Lacrosse
League	Team	City	Arena	Capacity
NLL	Calgary Roughnecks	Calgary	Scotiabank Saddledome	19,289
Soccer
League	Team	City	Stadium	Capacity
CPL	Cavalry FC	Foothills County	ATCO Field	6,000
NSL	Calgary Wild FC	Calgary	McMahon Stadium	35,400

=== Map of cities with a professional sports team ===
Location with a professional sports team

== Former teams ==
=== Major league teams ===
Canadian football
League	Team	City	Years
ARFU	Calgary Bronks	Calgary	1935–1936
WIFU	Calgary Bronks	Calgary	1936–1940
Ice hockey
League	Team	City	Years
WCHL	Calgary Tigers	Calgary	1921–1926
WCHL	Edmonton Eskimos	Edmonton	1921–1926
WHA	Alberta Oilers	Edmonton	1972–1973
WHA	Edmonton Oilers	Edmonton	1973–1979
WHA	Calgary Cowboys	Calgary	1975–1977

=== Other former professional sports teams ===
Baseball
League	Team	City	Years
PCL (AAA)	Edmonton Trappers	Edmonton	1981–2004
PCL (AAA)	Calgary Cannons	Calgary	1985–2002
WIL (A, B)	Calgary Bronchos	Calgary	1922
WIL (A, B)	Edmonton Eskimos	Edmonton	1922
WIL (A, B)	Calgary Stampeders	Calgary	1953–1954
WIL (A, B)	Edmonton Eskimos	Edmonton	1953–1954
PIL (Rookie)	Lethbridge Expos	Lethbridge	1975–1976
PIL (Rookie)	Calgary Cardinals	Calgary	1977–1978
PIL (Rookie)	Lethbridge Dodgers	Lethbridge	1977–1983
PIL (Rookie)	Medicine Hat A's	Medicine Hat	1977
PIL (Rookie)	Medicine Hat Blue Jays	Medicine Hat	1978–2003
PIL (Rookie)	Calgary Expos	Calgary	1979–1984
PIL (Rookie)	Lethbridge Mounties	Lethbridge	1992–1995
PIL (Rookie)	Lethbridge Black Diamonds	Lethbridge	1996–1998
WCL (C, D)	Calgary Bronchos	Calgary	1907; 1909–1914; 1920–1921
WCL (C, D)	Edmonton Grays	Edmonton	1907
WCL (C, D)	Lethbridge Miners	Lethbridge	1907; 1909–1910
WCL (C, D)	Medicine Hat Hatters	Medicine Hat	1907; 1909–1910; 1913–1914
WCL (C, D)	Edmonton Eskimos	Edmonton	1909–1914; 1920–1921
WCL (C, D)	Bassano Boosters	Bassano	1912
WCL (C, D)	Red Deer Eskimos	Red Deer	1912
CBL (Ind.)	Calgary Outlaws	Calgary	2003
NOL (Ind.)	Calgary Vipers	Calgary	2005–2007
NOL (Ind.)	Edmonton Cracker Cats	Edmonton	2005–2007
GBL (Ind.)	Calgary Vipers	Calgary	2008–2010
GBL (Ind.)	Edmonton Cracker Cats	Edmonton	2008
GBL (Ind.)	Edmonton Capitals	Edmonton	2009–2010
NAL (Ind.)	Calgary Vipers	Calgary	2011
NAL (Ind.)	Edmonton Capitals	Edmonton	2011
Basketball
League	Team	City	Years
WBL	Calgary 88's	Calgary	1988–1992
CBA	Alberta Dusters	Lethbridge	1980–1982
NBL-C	Edmonton Skyhawks	Edmonton	1993–1994
NBL-C	Calgary Outlaws	Calgary	1994
Cricket
League	Team	City	Years
GT20	Edmonton Royals	Edmonton	2018–2019
Ice hockey
League	Team	City	Years
AHL	Edmonton Roadrunners	Edmonton	2004–2005
NWHL	Calgary Tigers	Calgary	1933–1936
NWHL	Edmonton Eskimos	Edmonton	1933–1936
PCHL	Calgary Stampeders	Calgary	1951–1952
PCHL	Edmonton Flyers	Edmonton	1951–1952
WHL	Calgary Stampeders	Calgary	1952–1963
WHL	Edmonton Flyers	Edmonton	1952–1963
NWHL	Calgary Oval X-Treme	Calgary	2002–2004
NWHL	Edmonton Chimos	Edmonton	2002–2004
WWHL	Calgary Oval X-Treme	Calgary	2004–2009
WWHL	Edmonton Chimos	Edmonton	2004–2011
Indoor soccer
League	Team	City	Years
NASL	Calgary Boomers	Calgary	1980–1981
NASL	Edmonton Drillers	Edmonton	1980–1982
NPSL	Edmonton Drillers	Edmonton	1996–2000
CMISL	Calgary United F.C.	Calgary	2007–2012
CMISL	Edmonton Drillers	Edmonton	2007–2010
Inline hockey
League	Team	City	Years
RHI	Calgary Rad'z	Calgary	1993–1994
RHI	Edmonton Sled Dogs	Edmonton	1994
Lacrosse
League	Team	City	Years
NLL	Edmonton Rush	Edmonton	2006–2015
Soccer
League	Team	City	Years
NASL	Edmonton Drillers	Edmonton	1979–1982
NASL	Calgary Boomers	Calgary	1981
A-League	Calgary Storm	Calgary	2002–2003
A-League	Calgary Mustangs	Calgary	2004
A-League	Edmonton Aviators	Edmonton	2004
PDL	Calgary Storm	Calgary	2001
CPSL	Calgary Mustangs	Calgary	1983
CPSL	Edmonton Eagles	Edmonton	1983
WSA	Edmonton Brick Men	Edmonton	1986
CSL	Calgary Kickers	Calgary	1987–1988
CSL	Edmonton Brick Men	Edmonton	1987–1990
CSL	Calgary Strikers	Calgary	1989

== See also ==
- Professional sports in Canada
- List of professional sports teams in Canada by city
