= Sherbrooke Indians =

- (1948–1951, 1953–1955); Sherbrooke, Quebec

Minor league affiliations
- Class: Class C (1950–1951; 1953–1955)
- Previous classes: Independent (1948–1949)
- League: Provincial League

Major league affiliations
- Team: Cleveland Indians (1953–1955)

Minor league titles
- League titles (2): 1948, 1951

Team data
- Name: Sherbrooke Indians (1953–1955)
- Previous names: Sherbrooke Athletics (1948–1951)
- Ballpark: Stade Amedée-Roy II (1953–1955)
- Previous parks: Stade Amedée-Roy I (1948–1951)

The Sherbrooke Indians were a minor league baseball team located in Sherbrooke, Quebec, Canada. They played in the Provincial League from 1948 to 1951 as the Sherbrooke Athletics and again from 1953 to 1955 as the Indians. They won the first Provincial League pennant in 1948. In 1951, they won a second pennant, but five hours after their final game, their stadium burned down, forcing the team to sit out the 1952 season as the ballpark was rebuilt. When they returned to action in 1953, they were affiliated with the Cleveland Indians.

== Season-by-season ==
| Year | Record | Finish Full Season | Attendance | Manager | Postseason |
|---|---|---|---|---|---|
| 1953 | 84–41 | First | -- | Pinky May | |
| 1954 | 76–53 | Second | -- | Mark Wylie | |
| 1955 | 53–76 | Fifth | -- | Edd Hartness | |

== Major League alumni ==
- Gary Bell
- Bill Brandt
- Dick Brown
- Paul Calvert
- John Corriden
- Bill Dailey
- Harry Feldman
- Roland Gladu
- Frank Jelincich
- Lou Knerr
- Bobby Locke
- Fred Martin
- Ralph McCabe
- William Metzig
- Dan Osinski
- Armando Roche
- Jean-Pierre Roy
- Hal Schacker
- Ralph Schwamb
- Ebba St. Claire
- Billy Williams
- Adrian Zabala
