= Stade L.P. Gaucher =

Arena in Quebec, Canada

Coordinates: 45.63422°N 72.95377°W

The Stade L.P. Gaucher is a multi-purpose arena in Saint-Hyacinthe, Quebec. It has a capacity of 2,048 and was built in 1937. The arena is home to the Saint-Hyacinthe Bataillon of the Ligue Nord-Américaine de Hockey (LNAH). The arena previously hosted teams in the Ligue Nord-Américaine de Hockey from 2001 to 2009, the last of which was the Saint-Hyacinthe Chiefs. It was home to the Saint-Hyacinthe Laser of the Quebec Major Junior Hockey League from 1989 to 1996.
