= Quebec Braves =

- 1939–1955; (1939–1942, 1946–1955); Quebec City, Quebec

Minor league affiliations
- Previous classes: Class C
- League: Provincial League (1951–1955)
- Previous leagues: Canadian–American League (1941–1942, 1946–1950); Quebec Provincial League (1939–1940)

Major league affiliations
- Previous teams: Boston Braves/Milwaukee Braves (1951–1955); New York Giants (1948); Chicago Cubs (1946); Brooklyn Dodgers (1941)

Minor league titles
- League titles (6): 1949; 1950; 1952; 1953; 1954; 1955

Team data
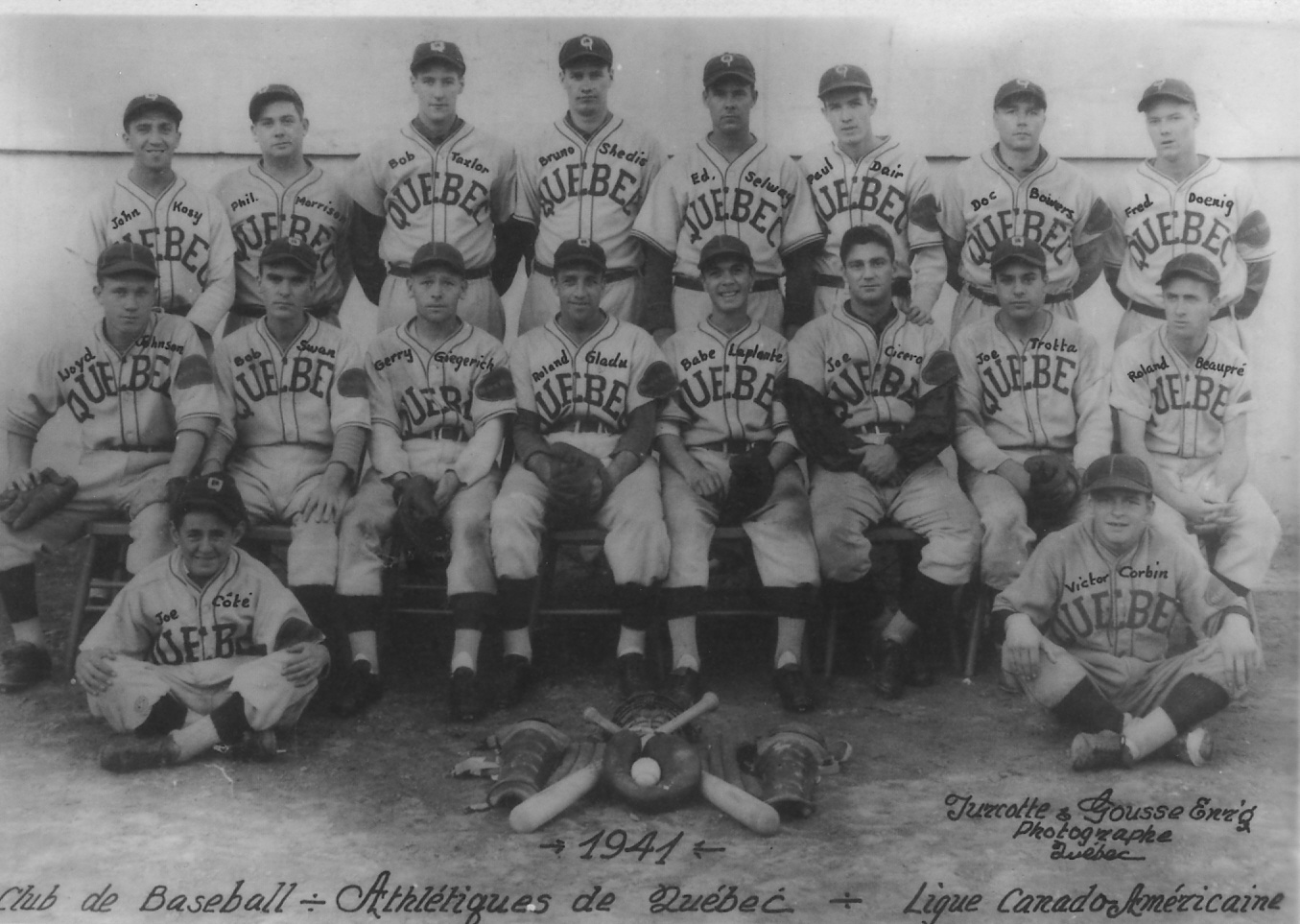
- Previous names: Quebec Braves (1949–1955); Quebec Alouettes (1946–1948); Quebec Athletics (1939–1942); Quebec Athletics Team Photo 1941
- Previous parks: Stade Municipal de Québec

The Quebec Athletics/Alouettes/Braves were a Minor League Baseball team that operated from 1939–1955. Operating in Quebec City, the team played in the Quebec Provincial League in 1939 and 1940 and the Canadian–American League from 1941–1942 and 1946–1950. They were affiliated with the Brooklyn Dodgers during the 1941 season, the Chicago Cubs in 1946, New York Giants in 1948 and the Boston Braves/Milwaukee Braves from 1951–1955. The 1950 Braves were recognized as one of the 100 greatest minor league teams of all time.
