= Québec Carnavals =

Canadian minor league baseball team in the 1970s

- 1971–1977; Quebec City

Minor league affiliations
- Class: Double-A (1971–1977)
- League: Eastern League (1971–1977)

Major league affiliations
- Team: Montreal Expos (1971–1977)

Minor league titles
- Division titles (1): 1974

Team data
- Name: Quebec Metros (1976–1977); Quebec Carnavals (1971–1975)
- Ballpark: Stade Municipal (1971–1977)

The Québec Carnavals (French: Carnavals de Québec) were a Minor League Baseball team located in Quebec City that served as the Montreal Expos' Double-A Eastern League affiliate from 1971 to 1977. They became known as the Québec Metros (French: Metros de Québec) for the 1976 and 1977 seasons. Following the 1977 season, the Expos moved their Double-A affiliation to the Memphis Chicks, an expansion team of the Southern League.

== History ==
In 1969, the Montreal Expos were founded as members of the National League as Major League Baseball expanded to 24 teams. Filling out their minor league roster, Montreal announced that Quebec City would host the club's farm system. This was the Expos' first sole Double-A affiliate after sharing the Jacksonville Suns with the Milwaukee Brewers in 1970. Quebec joined fellow Canadian franchise, the Trois-Rivières Aigles, as new members of the Eastern League.

== Season-by-season record ==
Season	PDC	Division	Finish	Wins	Losses	Win%	Postseason	Manager	Attendance
Québec Carnavals
1971	MTL	National	4th	64	75	.460	—	Gus Niarhos	99,688
1972	MTL	National	3rd	75	65	.540	—	Karl Kuehl	148,818
1973	MTL	National	4th	65	72	.474	—	Karl Kuehl	116,236
1974	MTL	National	1st	76	64	.543	Lost to Pittsfield in semifinal series, 2–0	Lance Nichols	82,133
1975	MTL	—	5th	63	73	.463	—	Lance Nichols	55,509
Québec Metros
1976	MTL	North	2nd	78	59	.569	—	Lance Nichols	54,061
1977	MTL	Canadian-American	2nd	65	70	.481	—	Doc Edwards	60,524

Division winner	League champions
