= Saint-Hyacinthe Bataillon =

- City: Saint-Hyacinthe, Quebec
- League: LNAH
- Founded: 2024
- Home arena: Stade L.P. Gaucher
- General manager: Maxim Lapierre, Guillaume Latendresse
- Head coach: Dominic Lapensée

Le Bataillon de Saint-Hyacinthe or the Saint-Hyacinthe Bataillon is a semi-professional ice hockey team playing in the Ligue Nord-Américaine de Hockey (LNAH) based in Saint-Hyacinthe, Quebec. The team plays at the Stade L.P. Gaucher.

== History ==
The team was founded in 2024 by former NHL players Maxim Lapierre and Guillaume Latendresse who both serve as general managers. The team is named after the 6th Battalion, Royal 22e Régiment, a Canadian Army reserve unit based in Saint-Hyacinthe.
