= Saint-Jean Canadiens =

- 1948–1955; Saint-Jean-sur-Richelieu, Quebec

Minor league affiliations
- Previous classes: Class C (1950-1955); Independent (1948-1949)
- Previous leagues: Provincial League

Major league affiliations
- Previous teams: Pittsburgh Pirates (1952-1955)

Minor league titles
- League titles (1): 1950

Team data
- Previous names: Saint-Jean Canadians (1952-1955); Saint-Jean Braves (1948-1951)

The Saint-Jean Canadiens (French: Les Canadiens de Saint-Jean-sur-Richelieu) were a minor league baseball team which existed between 1948 and 1955. Based in Saint-Jean-sur-Richelieu, Quebec the club competed in the Provincial League. The franchise was founded in 1948 as the Saint-Jean Braves. It won the league title in 1950, and was a class-C affiliate of the Pittsburgh Pirates from 1952 to 1955.

== Season-by-season ==
Year	Record	Finish	Manager	Playoffs
1948	56-44	2nd	Jean-Pierre Roy / Bobby Estalella	No playoffs
1949	45-53	4th	Don Savage / Red Hayworth	No playoffs
1950	58-49	1st	Steve Mizerak	League Champs (vs. Sherbrooke Athlétiques, 4 games to 3); Won in 1st round (vs. Farnham Pirates, 4 games to 1)
1951	52-68	6th	Steve Mizerak	
1952	63-66	3rd	Gordon Maltzberger	Lost in 1st round (vs. St. Hyacinthe A's, 4 games to 3)
1953	57-65	6th	George Genovese	
1954	53-73	5th	George DeTore / Steve Mizerak	
1955	86-44	1st	Steve Mizerak / Fred Luciano	Lost in 1st round (vs. Burlington A's, 4 games to 1)
