= Drummondville (baseball) =

Defunct Canadian baseball team

The Drummondville professional baseball team was a member of the now extinct Quebec Provincial League and operated in Drummondville, in the Centre-du-Québec region of Quebec. The team went through many incarnations over the years. They debuted as the Drummondville Tigers in 1940, but disbanded on July 6 of that year after posting a poor record.

Professional baseball would come back to Quebec after World War II, when the Provincial League began operations. The league was rated as Class C, and the Drummondville Cubs would play as an unaffiliated team from 1948 to 1951. Then in 1952, the Cubs signed an agreement with the Washington Senators, and officially became the Senators Class C franchise.

They would change their name to the Drummondville Royals in 1953 and again operate as a co-operative franchise. In 1954 the Philadelphia Athletics would come to town and make Drummondville their Class C home. The team then was renamed as the Drummondville A's, during what turned out to be their final season in the league.

== Timetable ==
Year	Record	W–L%	Finish	Manager	Notes
1940	6-26	.188	–	Charlie Small	Folded on July 6
1948	39-58	.402	5th	n/a	
1949	63-34	.649	1st	Max Lanier; Stan Bréard	Champion team
1950	53-52	.505	4th	Fido Murphy; John White; Stan Bréard	Lost 1st Round Playoff
1951	71-49	.592	3rd	Stan Bréard	Lost 1st Round Playoff
1952	57-68	.426	5th	Herb Crompton	
1953	42-79	.347	–	Joseph Oliffe; Al Gionfriddo	

== Selected players by season ==
- George Armstrong (1950)
- Dan Bankhead (1953)
- Bob Barthelson (1950)
- Julio Bécquer (1952)
- Hank Biasetti (1954)
- Herb Crompton (1952)
- Danny Gardella (1949)
- Al Gionfriddo (1953)
- Max Lanier (1949)
- Eric MacKenzie (1954)
- Sal Maglie (1949)
- Len Perme (1951)
- Jean-Pierre Roy (1951)
- Vic Power (1949–1950)
- Jim Pearce (1948)
- Tex Shirley (1949)
- Quincy Trouppe (1949)
- Joe Tuminelli (1948–1949)
- Roberto Vargas (1949)
- Ed Wheeler (1951)
- Roy Zimmerman (1949)
