= Trois-Rivières Royals =

- 1939–1955; (1939–1942, 1946–1955); Trois-Rivières, Quebec

Minor league affiliations
- Previous classes: Class C (1941–1942, 1946–1955); Class B (1940)
- League: Provincial League (1951–1955)
- Previous leagues: Canadian–American League (1941–1942, 1946–1950); Quebec Provincial League (1939–1940)

Major league affiliations
- Previous teams: Philadelphia Phillies (1954–1955); Brooklyn Dodgers (1946–1950)

Minor league titles
- League titles: 2 (1940, 1946)

Team data
- Previous names: Trois-Rivières Phillies (1954–1955); Trois-Rivières Yankees (1952–1953); Trois-Rivières Royals (1946–1951); Trois-Rivières Renards (1940–1942); Trois-Rivières (1939)
- Ballpark: Stade Municipal de Trois-Rivières

The baseball team in Trois-Rivières, Quebec has gone through many incarnations.

They began as the Trois-Rivières Renards and played in the Quebec Provincial League and the original Canadian–American League from 1940–1942 when they were shut down due to World War II.

The team returned in 1946 as the Trois-Rivières Royals, an affiliate of the Brooklyn Dodgers through 1950. In 1951, the team moved to the Provincial League as an independent team before becoming an affiliate of the New York Yankees in 1952 and changing its name to the Trois-Rivières Yankees. From 1954–1955 they were a Philadelphia Phillies affiliate known as the Trois-Rivières Phillies. When the league folded in 1955, so did the team.
