= Professional sports in Canada =

There are professional teams based in Canada in several professional sports leagues. The National Hockey League currently has seven Canadian franchises and is the most popular professional sports league in Canada. The Canadian Football League, Canadian Elite Basketball League, Canadian Premier League, and Northern Super League are the only all-Canadian major professional sports leagues. Major League Baseball, the National Basketball Association, Major League Soccer, and the Professional Women's Hockey League also have Canadian teams.

== Baseball ==
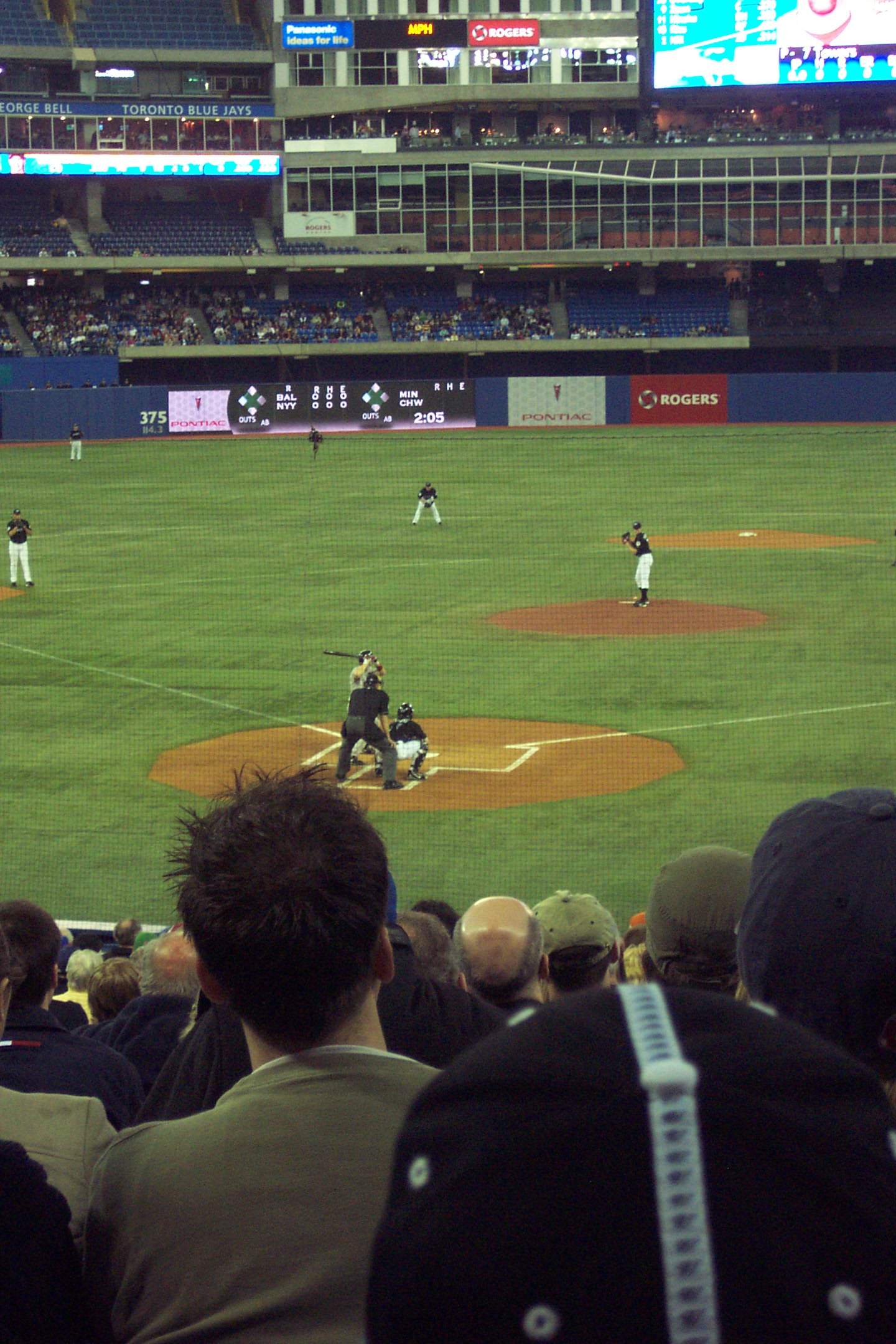
A Toronto Blue Jays baseball game at Rogers Centre in Toronto.

Currently, the Toronto Blue Jays are Canada's only Major League Baseball team, founded in 1977. The Montreal Expos (Canada's first Major League Baseball team) played in Montreal from 1969 until 2004 when they moved to Washington, D.C. and became the Washington Nationals. The Blue Jays were the first non-American team to host a World Series Game (in 1992) and the only non-American team to win the World Series (back to back in 1992 and 1993). The Blue Jays had the highest attendance in Major League Baseball during the late 1980s and early 1990s. Professional baseball has a long history in Canada, beginning with teams such as the London Tecumsehs, Montreal Royals, and Toronto Maple Leafs in the late 19th and early 20th centuries. All three were included on the National Baseball Association's top 100 minor league teams.

A number of Canadians have played in the major leagues, and several have won the highest honours in baseball. Ferguson Jenkins won the National League Cy Young Award in 1971 as the best pitcher in the league, and in 1991 became the first Canadian inducted in the (U.S.) Baseball Hall of Fame. Larry Walker was National League MVP for the 1997 season and was the league's Batting Champion 3 times. Éric Gagné won the National League Cy Young Award in 2003. Jason Bay was the first Canadian to win rookie of the year honours in 2004. More recently, Justin Morneau (American League, 2006) and Joey Votto (National League, 2010) have been named league MVPs.

Canada have participated in the World Baseball Classic, including the 2006 version in which it upset Team USA in first-round play, which some people in Canada call the "Miracle on Dirt" (a play on the phrase "Miracle on Ice" for the 1980 U.S. Olympic Hockey team). There are a number of minor league, semi-professional and collegiate baseball teams in Canada (see List of baseball teams in Canada). Great achievements in Canadian baseball are recognized by the Canadian Baseball Hall of Fame.

Canada also features professional minor league baseball teams. The Vancouver Canadians play in the Single-A Northwest League, and also serve as a minor league affiliate of the Toronto Blue Jays. The Winnipeg Goldeyes play in American Association of Independent Professional Baseball that has no affiliation with Major League Baseball. The Frontier League currently features three Canadian teams: the Trois-Rivières Aigles, the Quebec Capitales, and the Ottawa Titans. Like the Goldeyes, the Frontier League teams play in a pro-baseball league that has no MLB affiliation.

== Basketball ==
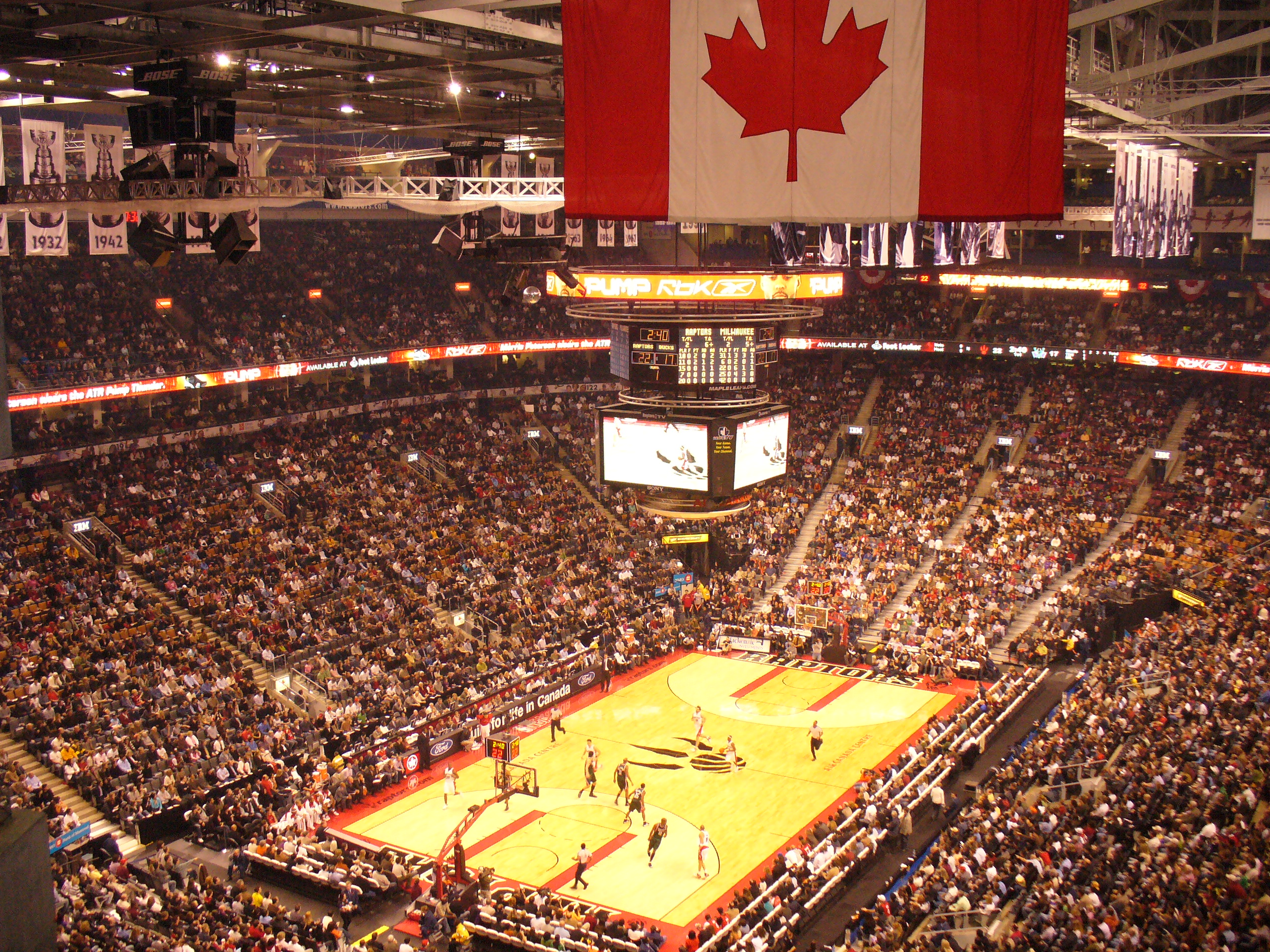
A packed Scotiabank Arena for a Toronto Raptors game against the Milwaukee Bucks

The National Basketball Association (NBA) recognizes its first ever game as being a contest between the New York Knickerbockers and Toronto Huskies at Toronto's Maple Leaf Gardens on November 1, 1946. The NBA expanded into Canada in 1995 with the addition of the Toronto Raptors and Vancouver Grizzlies. The Grizzlies moved to Memphis, Tennessee in 2001, but the Raptors continue to draw healthy crowds at Scotiabank Arena. The 2005 and 2006 NBA MVP, Steve Nash, is from British Columbia and has played in international competitions for Canada's national team. On June 13, 2019, the Toronto Raptors won game 6 against the Golden State Warriors for their first NBA Championship.

In 2011, the National Basketball League of Canada was established as a new domestic pro-basketball league. Following the conclusion of the 2022–23 NBLC season, the remaining NBLC teams were merged along with teams from the TBL into the new Basketball Super League.

In 2015, the NBA G League (then branded as the NBA D-League) expanded into Canada with the addition of the Raptors 905. Based in Mississauga, Ontario, the Raptors 905 play out of the Paramount Fine Foods Centre and serve as a minor league affiliate of the Toronto Raptors. In 2017, Raptors 905 won the NBA D-League championship.

In 2019, a second domestic pro-basketball league was established in Canada with the Canadian Elite Basketball League (CEBL). As of 2022, the league consists of 10 teams: the Edmonton Stingers, the Vancouver Bandits (based out of Abbotsford, British Columbia), the Calgary Surge, the Brampton Honey Badgers, the Niagara River Lions (based out of St. Catharines, Ontario), the Ottawa Blackjacks, the Saskatchewan Rattlers (based out of Saskatoon, Saskatchewan), the Montreal Alliance, the Winnipeg Sea Bears, & the Scarborough Shooting Stars.

On May 13, 2023, Scotiabank Arena hosted a preseason WNBA game between the Minnesota Lynx & the Chicago Sky with the Sky defeating the Lynx 82-74. This marked the first ever WNBA game of any sort to have been played in Canada, and it was played before a sold-out crowd of 19,800. WNBA commissioner Cathy Engelbert remarked that the league was "thrilled with the reception" and that Toronto "scored really well" and "is very high on the list" of about 10 cities for potential expansion. On May 23, 2024, the Toronto Tempo was created and will begin play in 2026 at the Coca-Cola Coliseum.

In 2024, the Long Island Nets of the NBA G League, in partnership with the Groupe CH (the owners of the Montreal Canadiens & Laval Rocket), announced that 6 of their home games would be played at Place Bell in Laval, Quebec during the 2024–25 NBA G League season. Their first of 6 games was played on January 24, 2025 vs. the visiting Raptors 905.

== Cricket ==
The Global T20 Canada is a 20-over cricket tournament played in Canada. The first season of the tournament started in June 2018, with six teams competing. The Maple Leaf Cricket Club in King City, Ontario hosted all matches for the first season of the competition, while the ensuing 3 tournaments in 2019, 2023 & 2024 took place at the CAA Centre in Brampton, Ontario.

== Football ==
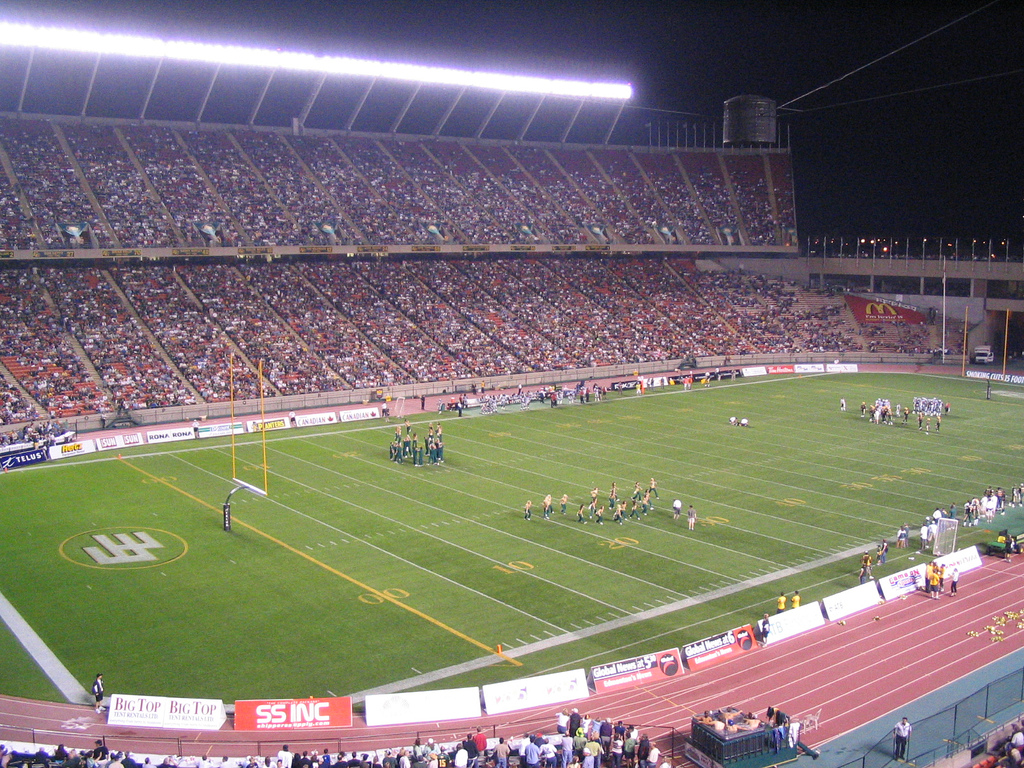
An Edmonton Elks football game at Commonwealth Stadium.

Canadian football has similar longevity to hockey, with currently active teams such as the Toronto Argonauts and Hamilton Tiger-Cats tracing their history back to the 1860s and 1870s. The CFL's championship game, the Grey Cup, is the country's single largest sporting event and is watched by nearly one third of Canadian television households. The nine Canadian football teams are the B.C. Lions, Calgary Stampeders, Edmonton Elks, Saskatchewan Roughriders, Winnipeg Blue Bombers, Toronto Argonauts, Hamilton Tiger-Cats, Montreal Alouettes, and Ottawa Redblacks.

The Canadian Football League is the second most popular professional sports league in Canada. Each of the CFL's 9 teams draw anywhere from 20,000 to 40,000+ spectators per game. Although western teams enjoy consistently higher stadium attendance numbers than their eastern counterparts, the league enjoys strong TV ratings across the board, comparable to other major sports leagues in North America.

== Ice hockey ==
Professionalism in ice hockey goes back to the start of the 20th century. The Stanley Cup was originally an amateur championship for Canada that began in 1893, but after 1906, professionals were allowed to play for it and quickly came to dominate the most successful teams. After 1908 the Allan Cup became Canada's amateur title and the Stanley Cup become a professional trophy, and after 1914 was opened to teams from the United States.

Several rival leagues competed to dominate the professional hockey market in the early years but the National Hockey Association (1910–1917) was the most successful in Central Canada while the Pacific Coast Hockey Association (1912–1924) was the most successful in British Columbia and the American Northwest, and the champions of the two leagues would face each other for the Stanley Cup each year until 1914 to 1921.

The NHA became the NHL in 1917 when the Montreal Canadiens, Montreal Wanderers, Ottawa Senators and Quebec Bulldogs agreed to form a new league without the Toronto Blueshirts and their hated owner Eddie Livingstone. Quebec sat out the first two seasons, the Blueshirts were replaced by the Toronto Arenas, and the Wanderers folded after the first season in the new league. However the league slowly stabilized and solidified. The NHL began to expand into the United States starting with Boston Bruins in 1924, which helped it financially. However, in trend to be repeated through the NHL's history, many of its Canadian teams in small markets struggled to compete with their richer big-city Canadian and American rivals forcing the Quebec Bulldogs to move and become the Hamilton Tigers in 1920 and to fold in 1925.

The PCHA was founded in 1912 by the New Westminster Royals, Vancouver Millionaires, Victoria Senators. The PCHA was limited in its growth compared to the NHL by Western Canada's much smaller and more disperse population relative to the East, especially at that times, and attempted to expand to the United States to compensate, but hockey was not as successful in cities like Portland and Seattle as in Boston or New York and the PCHA struggled in comparison to the NHL. When it folded in 1921 two of its teams joined the prairie-based Western Canada Hockey League (1921–1926) initially of the Edmonton Eskimos, Calgary Tigers, Regina Capitals, and Saskatoon Sheiks. The WCHL also challenged the NHL for the Stanley Cup, but when the WCHL folded in 1926 the NHL took over the Stanley Cup and became the most prestigious hockey league in the world.

The NHL gradually became more American as expansion franchises appeared and Canadian teams folded or moved. The Ottawa Senators became the St. Louis Eagles in 1934 (and then folded), and the Montreal Maroons (1924–1938) folded as well, the last Stanley Cup winning team to have done so.

Only two serious challenges have come to the NHL's reign of dominance from within Canada since that time. The minor league Western Hockey League (1952–1974) had grown in numbers and quality during the 1960s, and seemed ready to become a major league. The NHL effectively crushed this upstart by expanding for the first time in decades beginning in 1967, included the absorption of the Vancouver Canucks in 1970. The World Hockey Association (1972–1979) included in teams in Canadian markets not yet served by the NHL including most successfully the Edmonton Oilers, Quebec Nordiques, and Winnipeg Jets, (less successfully as the Calgary Broncos, Calgary Cowboys, Ottawa Nationals, and Ottawa Civics) and hoped to compete directly with the NHL within their most profitable Canadian markets in the shape of the Toronto Toros and Vancouver Blazers. The WHA was plagued by franchise instability but the Edmonton, Winnipeg, and Quebec teams were considered strong enough that they were invited to join the NHL in 1979. The Atlanta Flames moved to Calgary to become the Calgary Flames in 1980.

Thus in 1980 there were seven strong Canadian teams in an NHL of 21 teams: the Vancouver Canucks, Calgary Flames, Edmonton Oilers, Winnipeg Jets, Toronto Maple Leafs, Montreal Canadiens, and Quebec Nordiques. This situation persisted until began a new round of expansion and relocation in 1991. Several new American teams were created but the only Canadian team added was the Ottawa Senators franchise, which began play in 1992, increasing the amount of Canadian teams in the NHL to eight. However a low Canadian dollar and increasing income gap between the US and Canada combined with rising player salaries (denominated in US dollars) and the fact that American teams received subsidies to build new arenas soon squeezed the Canadian franchises, causing the Quebec Nordiques to move to Denver, Colorado in 1995 and the Winnipeg Jets to move to Phoenix, Arizona in 1996, reducing the amount of Canadian teams in the NHL to six. The Edmonton Oilers were also in danger of moving when owner Peter Pocklington put them up for sale in 1997. However they were ultimately saved by having their lease at Northlands Coliseum dropped to practically zero by the City of Edmonton, and were purchased by a group of small business people the Edmonton Investors Group.

Since the Canadian dollar rebounded during the 2000s (decade), the Canadian teams are now more profitable than their American rivals, especially since they now all (except the Oilers and Flames) own their own relatively new arenas with many luxury boxes and concessions, including Rogers Arena (opened 1995), Bell Centre (1996), Canadian Tire Centre (1996), Scotiabank Arena (1999), & Canada Life Centre (2004). The Flames rent the Saddledome (opened 1983) from the City of Calgary, and the Oilers rent Rogers Place (2016) from the City of Edmonton. In 2010, several American teams were in financial trouble leading to speculation that one or more may move to Canada. Although the NHL repeatedly stated that it wanted to keep its teams in their current locations if at all possible, the Atlanta Thrashers relocated from Atlanta to Winnipeg in 2011, marking the return of the NHL to the city with a reincarnated Winnipeg Jets franchise, thus increasing the amount of Canadian teams in the NHL back to seven.

As well as the NHL, minor league hockey has existed in Canada in form of various American Hockey League (1936–present), and International Hockey League (1945–2001) franchises over the years, but most have moved to the United States since the 1990s. As of 2025, the Canadian franchises in the 32-team AHL are the Abbotsford Canucks, Belleville Senators, Calgary Wranglers, Laval Rocket, Manitoba Moose, and Toronto Marlies. The ECHL is a mid-level minor league that has one Canadian franchise within the 27-team league as of the 2024–25 season: the Trois-Rivières Lions, an expansion team for the 2021–22 season. The ECHL previously had 3 other Canadian franchises in its league. From 2018–2024, the Newfoundland Growlers also competed in the ECHL, winning the ECHL title in their inaugural 2018–19 season. In 2024 the ECHL terminated the team's membership in 2024 for failure to fulfill league bylaws before the conclusion of its season. The Brampton Beast played between 2014–2020 before ceasing operations after voluntarily suspending operations through at least the 2020–21 ECHL season due to the COVID-19 pandemic, then ceasing operations entirely in 2021. The Victoria Salmon Kings also played between 2004–2011.

=== Professional women's hockey ===
Professional women's hockey has seen starts and stops. The Canadian Women's Hockey League did not pay salaries, but it did pay stipends and bonuses. It folded in 2019. In 2020, the National Women's Hockey League (NWHL), the first women's league to pay salaries, expanded into Canada—the Toronto Six were joined in 2022 by the Montreal Force as Canadian franchises. The Six were the last team to win the championship Isobel Cup, in 2023, before the NWHL—by then rebranded the Premier Hockey Federation (PHF)—was dissolved as part of an effort to create the first unified women's professional league in North America. The Professional Women's Hockey League (PWHL) was founded the same year and began play in 2024 with three Canadian teams: Toronto, Ottawa, and Montreal. Toronto hosted the inaugural PWHL game on New Year's Day.

== Lacrosse ==
Of the 14 teams that play in the National Lacrosse League (NLL), six of them are Canadian based: the Halifax Thunderbirds, the Toronto Rock, the Saskatchewan Rush, the Calgary Roughnecks, the Ottawa Black Bears and the Vancouver Warriors.

== Motorsport ==
The Honda Indy Toronto is an IndyCar Series race, held annually in July on a temporary street circuit that runs through Exhibition Place and on Lake Shore Boulevard. The city has hosted the race for over thirty years and it is now IndyCar's second-longest running street race, only behind the Grand Prix of Long Beach and the fourth oldest race on the current IndyCar schedule in terms of number of races run. Historically, the city played host to the 1958 Jim Mideon 500, a NASCAR Cup Series racing event at Exhibition Stadium. Legendary NASCAR driver Lee Petty won this race, defeating his son Richard in the latter's Cup Series debut.

The Canadian Grand Prix is a Formula One World Championship race, held annually at Circuit Gilles Villeneuve on Notre Dame Island in Montreal. It was first staged at Mosport Park in Bowmanville, Ontario as a sports car event, before alternating between Mosport and Circuit Mont-Tremblant, Quebec after Formula One took over the event. After 1971, safety concerns led to the Grand Prix moving permanently to Mosport. In 1978, after similar safety concerns with Mosport, the Canadian Grand Prix moved to its current home at Circuit Gilles Villeneuve.

Canadian Tire Motorsports Park, formerly known as Mosport Park, is located approximately 100 km east of Toronto in the community of Bowmanville. The venue holds the unique distinction in motorsport of having hosted Formula One, IndyCar, NASCAR, Can-Am, MotoGP and World Superbike events. The track hosts Canada's largest annual sportscar race, the Mobil 1 SportsCar Grand Prix part of the IMSA WeatherTech SportsCar Championship, the NASCAR Camping World Truck Series Chevrolet Silverado 250, the NASCAR Pinty's Series, the Pirelli World Challenge and the Canadian Superbike Championship along with other events. The track was the original home of Formula One's Canadian Grand Prix from 1961 to 1977 (except for 1968 and 1970).

== Rugby league ==
Canada's first fully professional rugby team, the Toronto Wolfpack, debuted in the British/French League 1 and Challenge Cup competitions in 2017. After ceasing operations in 2020, the Wolfpack were revived and set to resume operations as a member of the North American Rugby League in 2022.

== Rugby union ==
Between 2019–2023, the Toronto Arrows were the only Canadian based team in Major League Rugby. In preparation for their inaugural season in the MLR, the Arrows played a series of exhibition games vs. various MLR teams between 2017–2018.

On November 27, 2023, it was announced that the Arrows would not compete in the 2024 MLR season.

== Soccer ==
Professional soccer in Canada has gone through many unsuccessful incarnations. As of 2016 things are much more stable with three teams playing within Major League Soccer: Toronto FC (joined 2007), Vancouver Whitecaps FC (joined 2011) and the CF Montréal (joined 2012 as Montreal Impact).

Toronto FC II are an affiliate club to Toronto FC of the MLS playing in MLS Next Pro.

In 2019 the Canadian Premier League (CanPL or CPL) was launched and has eight teams: Atlético Ottawa, Cavalry FC (based out of Foothills County, Alberta), FC Edmonton, Forge FC (based out of Hamilton, Ontario), HFX Wanderers FC (also spoken as Halifax Wanderers), Pacific FC (based out of Langford, British Columbia), Valour FC (based out of Winnipeg, Manitoba), and York United FC (based out of North York, Ontario).

In 2025, the Northern Super League, a fully Canadian women's pro league, will begin their inaugural season. Halifax Tides FC, Montreal Roses FC, AFC Toronto, Calgary Wild FC, Ottawa Rapid FC, and Vancouver Rise FC are the teams in the league.

== Longest winning streaks in Canadian professional sports ==
The Edmonton Oilers holds the single season record for longest winning streak by a Canadian based major league team winning 16 consecutive games during the 2023–24 NHL season. The Winnipeg Jets also won 16 consecutive games, but it was achieved between the end of one season through to the beginning of the next one (final 8 games of the 2023–24 NHL season; first 8 games of the 2024–25 NHL season).

The Oilers surpassed the previous record of 15 consecutive wins in a season set by the Toronto Raptors during the 2019–20 NBA season.

The Calgary Stampeders 14-game win streak was achieved during the 2016 CFL season. The Stampeders hold the franchise record for longest winning streak overall with a 22-game win streak, but it was achieved over two seasons (Aug 25, 1948 to Oct 15, 1949) during the era where the Stampeders played football as an amateur team.

== See also ==
- Major professional sports leagues in the United States and Canada
- List of professional sports teams in Alberta
- List of professional sports teams in British Columbia
- List of professional sports teams in Manitoba
- List of professional sports teams in Ontario
- List of professional sports teams in Quebec
