= Farnham Pirates =

The Farnham Pirates were a minor league baseball team located in Farnham, Quebec, Canada. They played in the Provincial League from 1948 to 1951. The team was managed by Sam Bankhead, who was a player-manager. He was the first black coach in Minor League Baseball.

Outfielder Fred Thomas played 58 games in the 1948 season batting .351 which caught the attention of Major League Baseball scouts. He was selected by the Cleveland Indians to join the Wilkes-Barre Barons farm-team who played in the Eastern League, where he was the first black player in the league.
