= Roland Gladu =

Canadian baseball player (1911–1994)

- Gladu in a Quebec uniform, c. 1940–1942
- Third baseman
- Born: May 10, 1911; Montreal, Quebec, Canada
- Died: July 26, 1994 (aged 83); Montreal, Quebec, Canada
- Batted: Left Threw: Right

MLB debut
- April 18, 1944, for the Boston Braves

Last MLB appearance
- May 24, 1944, for the Boston Braves

MLB statistics
- Batting average: .242
- Home runs: 1
- Runs batted in: 7
- Stats at Baseball Reference

Teams
- Boston Braves (1944)

Member of the Canadian

Baseball Hall of Fame
- Induction: 2021

Roland Edouard Gladu (Note: Retrosheet lists his full name as Joseph Albert Rolland Edouard Gladu.) (May 10, 1911 – July 26, 1994) was a Canadian professional baseball third baseman. He played in 21 games for the Boston Braves of Major League Baseball (MLB) during the 1944 baseball season. He was one of the "jumpers" who signed with the Mexican League in 1946, earning him a temporary suspension from organized baseball.

== Biography ==
Gladu's baseball career began in 1932 at Binghamton, New York, and extended over more than 20 years as a player and manager in five countries: Canada, the United States, Mexico, Cuba, and England. Gladu played in London in the late 1930s for a team based at West Ham Stadium. As player-manager for West Ham, he took the London circuit batting title with a .565 average in 1937, and led the team to two consecutive top-two finishes, as well as a 5-3 defeat over the touring 1936 United States Olympic baseball team.

Gladu was one of 13 players suspended by Commissioner of Baseball Happy Chandler in May 1946 for "jumping" to the Mexican League, which offered higher salaries than the U.S. major leagues. Gladu had signed with Veracruz three months prior. In 1946, he hit .322 over 91 games with the Tecolotes de Nuevo Laredo. The next year, he also hit .322, this time with the Tuneros de San Luis Potosí.

Gladu also played professional hockey in the off-season as a defenceman in the Quebec Hockey League. After his playing career, Gladu worked as a scout for the Milwaukee Braves. Pitcher Claude Raymond was one of the first players signed by Gladu.

Gladu died in 1994 in Montreal at age 83. He was inducted to the British Baseball Hall of Fame in 2011 and the Canadian Baseball Hall of Fame in 2021.
