= Provincial League (baseball) =

Canadian baseball league

The Provincial League, sometimes known as the Quebec Provincial League, was a minor league baseball league based in the Canadian province of Quebec. It went through a number of incarnations during the 20th century, spending time as both an independent baseball league (1922–23, 1935–1939, 1948–49, and 1958–1971) and as a member of the National Association of Professional Baseball Leagues (1924, 1940, and 1950–1955). It is notable as a successful independent league at a time when few existed, and was a haven for black and indigenous players excluded from organized baseball.

== Early history ==
The Provincial League was part of a long history of Quebec-based minor leagues. The first iterations played in 1894 and 1900. Later, the Ontario–Quebec–Vermont League played from 1922 to 1924, spending two years as an independent league before joining the National Association of Professional Baseball Leagues, the governing body of minor league baseball, in its last season. Like later incarnations of the league, it was the product of Canadian Pacific Railway sports promoter Joseph Page and retired Major League Baseball pitcher Jean Dubuc, who laboured extensively to set up teams in towns with Canadian Pacific stops.

The Provincial League concept was relaunched in 1935. The league spent five seasons as an independent circuit before joining the NAPBL as a Class B league in 1940 (equivalent to short-season Class A in the pre-2021 minor league system and Low-A today). Throughout this time, the most successful clubs were Quebec City and Trois-Rivières. The Provincial League took a hiatus during World War II, and returned afterward as an independent league with inconsistent levels of success. By 1948 it was again a fully professional six-team league, though outside the purview of the NAPBL. In 1950 it rejoined the NAPBL as a Class C circuit (equivalent to a Rookie-level league today), following a similar pattern to earlier successful independent organizations. It lasted until 1955 before folding. In 1958 the final iteration of the Provincial League launched; it lasted until 1971 as an independent organization.

The Provincial League has drawn some scholarly attention as a professional independent circuit during a time when very few such leagues existed. Especially in the late 1930s, it was known as safe haven for black and indigenous players who were excluded from the organized leagues. During this time, the opportunities it offered drew black players from across North America, and it even once included a team representing the Caughnawaga Mohawk reservation. Other notable players included Maurice Richard, Pete Gray, Adrián Zabala, Roland Gladu, and a retired Félix Mantilla.

== Member clubs (1940; 1949–1955) ==
- Burlington A's
- Drummondville A's
- Drummondville Cubs (Champions, 1949)
- Drummondville Royals
- Drummondville Tigers
- Farnham Pirates
- Granby Phillies
- Granby Red Socks/Red Sox
- Quebec Athletics
- Quebec Braves (Champions, 1952–1955)
- St. Hyacinthe A's
- St. Hyacinthe Saints
- St. Jean Braves (Champions, 1950)
- St. Jean Canadiens
- Sherbrooke Athletics (Champions, 1951)
- Sherbrooke Braves
- Sherbrooke Indians
- Thetford Mines Mineurs
- Trois-Rivières Foxes (Champions, 1940)
- Trois-Rivières Royals
- Trois-Rivières Phillies
- Trois-Rivières Yankees
