= 2026 Canadian Baseball League season =

2026 CBL season
- League: Canadian Baseball League
- Sport: Baseball
- Duration: May 10 – September 1, 2026
- Games: 48 (216 in total)
- Teams: 9
- CBL Pennant: Hamilton Cardinals

Dominico Cup Playoffs
- Champions: Welland Jackfish
- Runners-up: Hamilton Cardinals

CBL seasons
- ← 2025 2027 →

The 2026 Canadian Baseball League season is the 108th season of operation and first professional season of the Canadian Baseball League (CBL). The CBL was known as the Intercounty Baseball League until November 2025. Nine teams in Ontario will compete during the season. The teams are located in Barrie (Barrie Baycats), Brantford (Brantford Red Sox), Chatham-Kent (Chatham-Kent Barnstormers), Guelph (Guelph Royals), Hamilton (Hamilton Cardinals), Kitchener (Kitchener Panthers), London (London Majors), Toronto (Toronto Maple Leafs), and Welland (Welland Jackfish). The Jackfish are the reigning Dominico Cup champions entering the season.

== League and team changes ==
On November 24, 2025, it was announced that the league would be rebranding from the Intercounty Baseball League to the Canadian Baseball League for the 2026 season. It was also announced that the league would be transitioning from semi-pro to fully professional with a monthly salary cap of CA$30,000 per team, a season expansion from 42 to 48 games, and clearer league-wide standards and regulations. There will also be changes to the postseason format, with five teams qualifying and two best of seven series preceded by a one game playoff between the fourth and fifth place teams.

On November 27th, the Guelph Royals were put up for sale. The Royals, which joined the league as a founding member in 1919, had previously been sold after not fielding a team for the 2017 IBL season.

== Schedule ==
=== Regular season ===
The 2026 regular season schedule was released on December 22, 2025.

Game log
May

Date	Time (ET)	Visitor	Result	Home	Location	Attendance	Box score/recap
May 10	2:00	Kitchener	6 – 8	Toronto	Dominico Field	4,000	
May 14	7:38	Toronto	1 – 6	Barrie	Athletic Kulture Stadium	N/A	
May 15	7:05	Barrie	2 – 4	London	Labatt Park	N/A	
May 15	7:07	Welland	13 – 1	Brantford	Arnold Anderson Stadium	N/A	
May 15	7:35	Guelph	2 – 16	Chatham-Kent	Fergie Jenkins Field	N/A	
May 15	7:35	Kitchener	7 – 4	Hamilton	Bernie Arbour Memorial Stadium	N/A	
May 16	6:05	Guelph	1 – 10	Welland	Welland Stadium	3,248	
May 17	2:00	London	10 – 5	Brantford	Arnold Anderson Stadium	N/A	
May 17	2:00	Hamilton	8 – 2	Toronto	Dominico Field	N/A	
May 17	2:05	Chatham-Kent	5 – 9	Kitchener	Jack Couch Park	N/A	
May 19	7:35	London	PPD. (rain)	Chatham-Kent	Fergie Jenkins Field	–	
May 21	7:05	London	4 – 7	Kitchener	Jack Couch Park	N/A	
May 21	7:38	Welland	4 – 5 (10 innings)	Barrie	Athletic Kulture Stadium	N/A	
May 22	7:05	Guelph	1 – 3	London	Labatt Park	N/A	
May 22	7:35	Chatham-Kent	0 – 9	Hamilton	Bernie Arbour Memorial Stadium	N/A	
May 23	2:00	Brantford	PPD. (rain)	Guelph	Hastings Stadium	–	
May 23	4:08	Kitchener	PPD. (rain)	Barrie	Athletic Kulture Stadium	–	
May 23	6:05	Toronto	PPD. (rain)	Welland	Welland Stadium	–	
May 23	7:05	Hamilton	PPD. (rain)	Chatham-Kent	Fergie Jenkins Field	–	
May 24	2:00	London	PPD. (rain)	Brantford	Arnold Anderson Stadium	–	
May 24	2:00	Guelph	PPD. (rain)	Toronto	Dominico Field	–	
May 24	2:05	Welland	PPD. (rain)	Kitchener	Jack Couch Park	–	
May 26	7:05	Welland	6 – 1	Guelph	Hastings Stadium	N/A	
May 26	7:38	Kitchener	5 – 6 (10 innings)	Barrie	Athletic Kulture Stadium	N/A	
May 27	7:30	Barrie	13 – 3	Toronto	Dominico Field	N/A	
May 28	7:05	London	7 – 5	Kitchener	Jack Couch Park	N/A	
May 28	7:05	Barrie	11 – 10 (10 innings)	Welland	Welland Stadium	N/A	
May 29	7:05	Toronto	2 – 6	London	Labatt Park	N/A	
May 29	7:35	Kitchener	5 – 1	Chatham-Kent	Fergie Jenkins Field	N/A	
May 29	7:35	Brantford	0 – 2	Hamilton	Bernie Arbour Memorial Stadium	N/A	
May 30	2:00	Kitchener	10 – 8	Guelph	Hastings Stadium	N/A	
May 30	4:08	Chatham-Kent	3 – 2	Barrie	Athletic Kulture Stadium	N/A	
May 30	5:00	Hamilton	3 – 5	Brantford	Arnold Anderson Stadium	N/A	
May 30	6:05	London	0 – 3	Welland	Welland Stadium	N/A	
May 31	1:05	Brantford	5 – 4	Chatham-Kent	Fergie Jenkins Field	N/A	
May 31	2:00	Welland	6 – 2	Toronto	Dominico Field	N/A	
May 31	2:05	Hamilton	15 – 6	Kitchener	Jack Couch Park	N/A	
May 31	4:05	Guelph	12 – 7	London	Labatt Park	N/A	

June

Date	Time (ET)	Visitor	Result	Home	Location	Attendance	Box score/recap
June 2	7:05	Hamilton	5 – 6	Guelph	Hastings Stadium	N/A	
June 2	7:35	London	9 – 0	Chatham-Kent	Fergie Jenkins Field	N/A	
June 3	7:30	Guelph	14 – 7	Toronto	Dominico Field	N/A	
June 4	7:05	Hamilton	12 – 5	Kitchener	Jack Couch Park	N/A	
June 4	7:05	Brantford	2 – 15	Welland	Welland Stadium	N/A	
June 4	7:38	Chatham-Kent	10 – 11 (10 innings)	Barrie	Athletic Kulture Stadium	N/A	
June 5	7:05	Kitchener	4 – 8	London	Labatt Park	N/A	
June 5	7:07	Barrie	11 – 6	Brantford	Arnold Anderson Stadium	N/A	
June 5	7:35	Toronto	1 – 23	Hamilton	Bernie Arbour Memorial Stadium	N/A	
June 6	2:00	London	10 – 2	Guelph	Hastings Stadium	N/A	
June 6	6:05	Barrie	14 – 11	Welland	Welland Stadium	N/A	
June 6	7:05	Brantford	7 – 16	Chatham-Kent	Fergie Jenkins Field	N/A	
June 7	2:00	London	2 – 7	Toronto	Dominico Field	N/A	
June 7	2:05	Chatham-Kent	10 – 5	Kitchener	Jack Couch Park	N/A	
June 7	4:05	Welland	5 – 4 (10 innings)	Hamilton	Bernie Arbour Memorial Stadium	N/A	
June 7	6:08	Guelph	7 – 2	Barrie	Athletic Kulture Stadium	N/A	
June 9	7:05	Barrie	PPD. (rain)	Guelph	Hastings Stadium	–	
June 9	7:35	Welland	6 – 10	Chatham-Kent	Fergie Jenkins Field	N/A	
June 10	7:30	Guelph	10 – 0	Toronto	Dominico Field	N/A	
June 11	7:05	Brantford	11 – 15	Welland	Welland Stadium	N/A	
June 12	7:05	Toronto	13 – 4	Kitchener	Jack Couch Park	N/A	
June 12	7:05	Welland	5 – 6	London	Labatt Park	N/A	
June 12	7:35	Barrie	10 – 8	Chatham-Kent	Fergie Jenkins Field	N/A	
June 12	7:35	Brantford	5 – 7	Hamilton	Bernie Arbour Memorial Stadium	N/A	
June 13	2:00	Hamilton	5 – 6	Brantford	Arnold Anderson Stadium	N/A	
June 13	2:00	Kitchener	6 – 7	Guelph	Hastings Stadium	N/A	
June 13	6:05	London	6 – 4	Welland	Welland Stadium	N/A	
June 13	7:05	Barrie	7 – 2	Chatham-Kent	Fergie Jenkins Field	N/A	
June 14	1:05	Barrie	0 – 0 Suspended	Chatham-Kent	Fergie Jenkins Field	N/A	
June 14	2:00	Brantford	PPD. (rain)	Toronto	Dominico Field	–	
June 14	2:05	Guelph	PPD. (rain)	Kitchener	Jack Couch Park	–	
June 14	4:05	London	PPD. (rain)	Hamilton	Bernie Arbour Memorial Stadium	–	
June 16	7:05	Chatham-Kent	9 – 10	Guelph	Hastings Stadium	N/A	
June 17	7:05	Toronto	4 – 14	Welland	Welland Stadium	N/A	
June 18	7:05	Brantford	14 – 23	Kitchener	Jack Couch Park	N/A	
June 18	7:05	Chatham-Kent	10 – 12	Welland	Welland Stadium	N/A	
June 18	7:38	Toronto	3 – 13	Barrie	Athletic Kulture Stadium	N/A	
June 19	7:05	Kitchener	7 – 19	London	Labatt Park	N/A	
June 19	7:07	Welland	2 – 6	Brantford	Arnold Anderson Stadium	N/A	
June 19	7:30	Barrie	9 – 5	Toronto	Dominico Field	N/A	
June 19	7:35	Guelph	13 – 9	Hamilton	Bernie Arbour Memorial Stadium	N/A	
June 20	4:08	London	13 – 4	Barrie	Athletic Kulture Stadium	N/A	
June 20	7:05	Hamilton	6 – 7	Chatham-Kent	Fergie Jenkins Field	N/A	
June 20	7:05	Toronto	0 – 0 Suspended	Guelph	Hastings Stadium	N/A	
June 21	1:05	Guelph	6 – 20	Welland	Welland Stadium	N/A	
June 21	2:05	Barrie	18 – 7	Kitchener	Jack Couch Park	N/A	
June 21	4:05	Chatham-Kent	3 – 13	Hamilton	Bernie Arbour Memorial Stadium	N/A	
June 21	4:05	Brantford	2 – 10	London	Labatt Park	N/A	
June 22	7:05	Welland	PPD. (rain)	Kitchener	Jack Couch Park	–	
June 23	7:05	Brantford	4 – 5 (10 innings)	Guelph	Hastings Stadium	N/A	
June 23	7:35	London	5 – 9 (10 innings)	Chatham-Kent	Fergie Jenkins Field	N/A	
June 24	7:30	Welland	7 – 4	Toronto	Dominico Field	N/A	
June 25	7:05	Guelph	6 – 3	Kitchener	Jack Couch Park	N/A	
June 25	7:05	Hamilton	PPD. (rain)	Welland	Welland Stadium	–	
June 25	7:38	Brantford	8 – 6	Barrie	Athletic Kulture Stadium	N/A	
June 26	7:05	Toronto	1 – 17	London	Labatt Park	N/A	
June 26	7:07	Chatham-Kent	13 – 14	Brantford	Arnold Anderson Stadium	N/A	
June 26	7:35	Kitchener	4 – 5	Hamilton	Bernie Arbour Memorial Stadium	N/A	
June 27	6:05	Kitchener	5 – 1	Welland	Welland Stadium	N/A	
June 27	7:05	Barrie	2 – 3	Guelph	Hastings Stadium	N/A	
June 28	2:00	Guelph	10 – 4	Brantford	Arnold Anderson Stadium	N/A	
June 28	2:00	Chatham-Kent	7 – 11	Toronto	Dominico Field	N/A	
June 28	4:05	Hamilton	11 – 0	London	Labatt Park	N/A	
June 29	7:05	Welland	19 – 5	Kitchener	Jack Couch Park	N/A	
June 30	7:35	London	1 – 11	Hamilton	Bernie Arbour Memorial Stadium	N/A	

July

Date	Time (ET)	Visitor	Result	Home	Location	Attendance	Box score/recap
July 1	2:00	Chatham-Kent	8 – 9	Brantford	Arnold Anderson Stadium	N/A	
July 1	2:05	Guelph	7 – 14	Kitchener	Jack Couch Park	N/A	
July 1	6:05	Barrie	4 – 5 (10 innings)	London	Labatt Park	N/A	
July 1	6:05	Toronto	7 – 9	Welland	Welland Stadium	N/A	
July 2	7:38	Guelph	5 – 6	Barrie	Athletic Kulture Stadium	N/A	
July 3	7:05	Brantford	15 – 18	Kitchener	Jack Couch Park	N/A	
July 3	7:05	Chatham-Kent	0 – 10	London	Labatt Park	N/A	
July 3	7:30	Barrie	13 – 2	Toronto	Dominico Field	N/A	
July 3	7:35	Welland	3 – 4	Hamilton	Bernie Arbour Memorial Stadium	N/A	
July 4	2:00	Kitchener	3 – 4	Brantford	Arnold Anderson Stadium	N/A	
July 4	4:08	Hamilton	8 – 1	Barrie	Athletic Kulture Stadium	N/A	
July 4	6:05	Chatham-Kent	4 – 20	Welland	Welland Stadium	N/A	
July 4	7:05	Toronto	4 – 7	Guelph	Hastings Stadium	N/A	
July 5	2:00	London	8 – 11	Toronto	Dominico Field	N/A	
July 5	2:00	Welland	20 – 10	Brantford	Arnold Anderson Stadium	N/A	
July 7	7:05	Welland	7 – 4	Guelph	Hastings Stadium	N/A	
July 7	7:35	London	9 – 2	Chatham-Kent	Fergie Jenkins Field	N/A	
July 8	7:30	Hamilton	3 – 6	Toronto	Dominico Field	N/A	
July 9	7:05	Brantford	PPD. (rain)	Kitchener	Jack Couch Park	–	
July 9	7:38	Welland	1 – 3	Barrie	Athletic Kulture Stadium	N/A	
July 10	7:05	Guelph	8 – 5	London	Labatt Park	N/A	
July 10	7:07	Barrie	14 – 6	Brantford	Arnold Anderson Stadium	N/A	
July 10	7:35	Kitchener	15 – 3	Chatham-Kent	Fergie Jenkins Field	N/A	
July 10	7:35	Toronto	1 – 11	Hamilton	Bernie Arbour Memorial Stadium	N/A	
July 12	2:05	North All-Stars	8 – 4	South All-Stars	Fergie Jenkins Field	N/A	
July 14	7:05	Hamilton	5 – 6	Guelph	Hastings Stadium	N/A	
July 14	7:30	London	8 – 7	Brantford	Arnold Anderson Stadium	N/A	
July 15	7:30	Brantford	PPD. (wildfire smoke)	Toronto	Dominico Field	–	
July 16	7:05	Hamilton	PPD. (wildfire smoke)	Kitchener	Jack Couch Park	–	
July 16	7:05	Guelph	PPD. (wildfire smoke)	Welland	Welland Stadium	–	
July 17	7:05	Chatham-Kent	PPD. (wildfire smoke)	London	Labatt Park	–	
July 17	7:07	Guelph	PPD. (wildfire smoke)	Brantford	Arnold Anderson Stadium	–	
July 17	7:30	Kitchener	PPD. (wildfire smoke)	Toronto	Dominico Field	–	
July 18	4:08	London	PPD. (rain)	Barrie	Athletic Kulture Stadium	–	
July 18	6:05	Chatham-Kent	1 – 7	Welland	Welland Stadium	N/A	
July 18	7:05	Toronto	7 – 4	Guelph	Hastings Stadium	N/A	
July 19	2:00	Kitchener	2 – 3	Brantford	Arnold Anderson Stadium	N/A	
July 19	3:08	Toronto	12 – 8	Barrie	Athletic Kulture Stadium	N/A	
July 19	4:05	London	2 – 3	Hamilton	Bernie Arbour Memorial Stadium	N/A	
July 21	7:35	Hamilton	24 – 6	Chatham-Kent	Fergie Jenkins Field	N/A	
July 22	7:30	Guelph	17 – 4	Toronto	Dominico Field	N/A	
July 23	7:05	Guelph	6 – 10	Welland	Welland Stadium	N/A	
July 23	7:05	Toronto	9 – 3	Kitchener	Jack Couch Park	N/A	
July 23	7:38	Brantford	4 – 13	Barrie	Athletic Kulture Stadium	N/A	
July 24	7:05	Barrie	4 – 8	London	Labatt Park	N/A	
July 24	7:30	Welland	7 – 4	Toronto	Dominico Field	N/A	
July 24	7:35	Guelph	1 – 8	Chatham-Kent	Fergie Jenkins Field	N/A	
July 24	7:35	Kitchener	1 – 13	Hamilton	Bernie Arbour Memorial Stadium	N/A	
July 25	2:00	London	8 – 3	Brantford	Arnold Anderson Stadium	N/A	
July 25	4:00	Chatham-Kent	4 – 8	Guelph	Hastings Stadium	N/A	
July 25	4:08	Kitchener	1 – 8	Barrie	Athletic Kulture Stadium	N/A	
July 25	6:05	Hamilton	6 – 12	Welland	Welland Stadium	N/A	
July 26	1:05	Toronto	7 – 11	Chatham-Kent	Fergie Jenkins Field	N/A	
July 26	4:05	Hamilton	9 – 10 (10 innings)	London	Labatt Park	N/A	
July 26	5:05	Welland	30 – 8	Kitchener	Jack Couch Park	N/A	
July 28	7:05	Hamilton	8 – 5	Kitchener	Jack Couch Park	N/A	
July 28	7:05	London	2 – 4	Guelph	Hastings Stadium	N/A	
July 29	7:05	Barrie	2 – 6	Guelph	Hastings Stadium	N/A	
July 29	7:30	Brantford	11 – 15	Toronto	Dominico Field	N/A	
July 30	7:05	Kitchener	2 – 3 (10 innings)	Welland	Welland Stadium	N/A	
July 30	7:38	Hamilton	2 – 3	Barrie	Athletic Kulture Stadium	N/A	
July 31	7:05	Kitchener	2 – 17	London	Labatt Park	N/A	
July 31	7:07	Guelph	2 – 4	Brantford	Arnold Anderson Stadium	N/A	
July 31	7:35	Welland	25 – 2	Chatham-Kent	Fergie Jenkins Field	N/A	
July 31	7:35	Barrie	4 – 5	Hamilton	Bernie Arbour Memorial Stadium	N/A	

August/September

Date	Time (ET)	Visitor	Result	Home	Location	Attendance	Box score/recap
August 1	6:05	London	6 – 4	Welland	Welland Stadium	N/A	
August 1	7:05	Kitchener	0 – 3	Guelph	Hastings Stadium	N/A	
August 1	7:30	Chatham-Kent	6 – 11	Toronto	Dominico Field	N/A	
August 2	1:05	Toronto	PPD. (rain)	Chatham-Kent	Fergie Jenkins Field	–	
August 2	2:00	Hamilton	PPD. (rain)	Brantford	Arnold Anderson Stadium	–	
August 2	6:08	Welland	PPD. (rain)	Barrie	Athletic Kulture Stadium	–	
August 3	4:05	Guelph	6 – 7	Hamilton	Bernie Arbour Memorial Stadium	N/A	
August 3	6:05	Brantford	3 – 16	London	Labatt Park	N/A	
August 4	7:35	Kitchener	8 – 5	Chatham-Kent	Fergie Jenkins Field	N/A	
August 5	7:05	Brantford	4 – 10	Guelph	Hastings Stadium	N/A	
August 5	7:30	Hamilton	14 – 13	Toronto	Dominico Field	N/A	
August 5	7:38	London	8 – 0	Barrie	Athletic Kulture Stadium	N/A	
August 6	7:05	Guelph	5 – 6	Kitchener	Jack Couch Park	N/A	
August 6	7:05	Barrie	3 – 7	Welland	Welland Stadium	N/A	
August 7	7:05	Welland	1 – 3	London	Labatt Park	N/A	
August 7	7:07	Toronto	10 – 9 (11 innings)	Brantford	Arnold Anderson Stadium	N/A	
August 7	7:35	Chatham-Kent	5 – 8	Hamilton	Bernie Arbour Memorial Stadium	N/A	
August 8	4:08	Kitchener	PPD. (rain)	Barrie	Athletic Kulture Stadium	–	
August 8	7:05	Welland	1 – 4	Guelph	Hastings Stadium	N/A	
August 8	7:05	Brantford	PPD. (rain)	Chatham-Kent	Fergie Jenkins Field	–	
August 8	7:30	London	20 – 4	Toronto	Dominico Field	N/A	
August 9	2:00	Chatham-Kent	2 – 5 Game 1 - DH	Brantford	Arnold Anderson Stadium	N/A	
August 9	2:05	Barrie	6 – 3 Game 1 - DH	Kitchener	Jack Couch Park	N/A	
August 9	4:05	Toronto	2 – 3	Guelph	Hastings Stadium	N/A	
August 9	4:05	Hamilton	6 – 4	London	Labatt Park	N/A	
August 9	4:35	Brantford	10 – 1 Game 2 - DH	Chatham-Kent	Arnold Anderson Stadium	N/A	
August 9	4:35	Kitchener	6 – 5 Game 2 - DH	Barrie	Jack Couch Park	N/A	
August 11	7:05	Barrie	8 – 4	Guelph	Hastings Stadium	N/A	
August 11	7:35	Hamilton	9 – 10	Chatham-Kent	Fergie Jenkins Field	N/A	
August 12	7:05	Brantford	12 – 4	Kitchener	Jack Couch Park	N/A	
August 12	7:05	Chatham-Kent	4 – 10	London	Labatt Park	N/A	
August 13	7:05	Toronto	5 – 7	Kitchener	Jack Couch Park	N/A	
August 13	7:05	Brantford	5 – 6 (10 innings)	Welland	Welland Stadium	N/A	
August 13	7:38	Hamilton	2 – 1	Barrie	Athletic Kulture Stadium	N/A	
August 14	7:05	Toronto	10 – 7	London	Labatt Park	N/A	
August 14	7:35	Guelph	14 – 4	Chatham-Kent	Fergie Jenkins Field	N/A	
August 14	7:35	Welland	6 – 7	Hamilton	Bernie Arbour Memorial Stadium	N/A	
August 15	4:08	London	12 – 9	Barrie	Athletic Kulture Stadium	N/A	
August 15	6:05	Kitchener	2 – 18	Welland	Welland Stadium	N/A	
August 15	7:00	Brantford	7 – 10	Guelph	Hastings Stadium	N/A	
August 15	7:30	Chatham-Kent	4 – 2	Toronto	Dominico Field	N/A	
August 16	1:05	Welland	9 – 0	Chatham-Kent	Fergie Jenkins Field	N/A	
August 16	2:00	Toronto	2 – 17	Brantford	Arnold Anderson Stadium	N/A	
August 16	2:05	Barrie	14 – 9	Kitchener	Jack Couch Park	N/A	
August 16	4:05	London	4 – 3	Hamilton	Bernie Arbour Memorial Stadium	N/A	
August 17	7:07	Hamilton	1 – 7	Brantford	Arnold Anderson Stadium	N/A	
August 18	7:05	Chatham-Kent	14 – 9	Guelph	Hastings Stadium	N/A	
August 18	7:35	Barrie	6 – 3	Hamilton	Bernie Arbour Memorial Stadium	N/A	
August 19	7:30	Brantford	22 – 18	Toronto	Dominico Field	N/A	
August 20	7:05	Welland	12 – 7	Kitchener	Jack Couch Park	N/A	
August 20	7:38	Guelph	6 – 3 (12 innings)	Barrie	Athletic Kulture Stadium	N/A	
August 21	7:05	Chatham-Kent	0 – 5	London	Labatt Park	N/A	
August 21	7:07	Toronto	2 – 6	Brantford	Arnold Anderson Stadium	N/A	
August 21	7:35	Guelph	8 – 6	Hamilton	Bernie Arbour Memorial Stadium	N/A	
August 21	7:38	Welland	2 – 4	Barrie	Athletic Kulture Stadium	N/A	
August 22	2:38	Brantford	12 – 8	Barrie	Athletic Kulture Stadium	N/A	
August 22	6:05	Hamilton	PPD. (rain)	Welland	Welland Stadium	–	
August 22	7:05	London	PPD. (rain)	Guelph	Hastings Stadium	–	
August 22	7:30	Kitchener	PPD. (rain)	Toronto	Dominico Field	–	
August 23	2:05	Chatham-Kent	PPD. (rain)	Kitchener	Jack Couch Park	–	
August 23	4:05	Welland	9 – 2 Suspended	London	Labatt Park	N/A	
August 23	5:30	Toronto	4 – 8	Hamilton	Bernie Arbour Memorial Stadium	N/A	
August 23	7:00	Barrie	5 – 9	Brantford	Arnold Anderson Stadium	N/A	
August 24	7:35	Toronto	7 – 24	Chatham-Kent	Fergie Jenkins Field	N/A	
August 25	7:05	Hamilton	11 – 1	Welland	Welland Stadium	N/A	
August 25	7:07	Guelph	14 – 8	Brantford	Arnold Anderson Stadium	N/A	
August 25	7:35	Barrie	10 – 1	Chatham-Kent	Fergie Jenkins Field	N/A	
August 26	7:05	London	4 – 6	Guelph	Hastings Stadium	N/A	
August 26	7:05	Chatham-Kent	6 – 5 (11 innings)	Kitchener	Jack Couch Park	N/A	
August 26	7:30	Brantford	6 – 7	Toronto	Dominico Field	N/A	
August 27	7:05	Hamilton	5 – 2	Welland	Welland Stadium	N/A	
August 27	7:05	London	3 – 7	Kitchener	Jack Couch Park	N/A	
August 28	5:00	Kitchener	7 – 3 Game 1 - DH	Toronto	Dominico Field	N/A	
August 28	7:05	Brantford	8 – 7	London	Labatt Park	N/A	
August 28	7:30	Kitchener	3 – 13; Game 2 - DH	Toronto	Dominico Field	N/A	
August 28	7:35	Barrie	2 – 4	Hamilton	Bernie Arbour Memorial Stadium	N/A	
August 29	2:00	Kitchener	3 – 26	Brantford	Arnold Anderson Stadium	N/A	
August 29	4:08	Chatham-Kent	3 – 4	Barrie	Athletic Kulture Stadium	N/A	
August 29	6:05	Toronto	0 – 9	Welland	Welland Stadium	N/A	
August 29	7:05	Hamilton	8 – 5	Guelph	Hastings Stadium	N/A	
August 30	4:05	Toronto	Cancelled (rain)	Chatham-Kent	Fergie Jenkins Field	–	
August 30	4:05	Brantford	3 – 15	Hamilton	Bernie Arbour Memorial Stadium	N/A	
September 1	7:05	Welland	11 – 3	London	Labatt Park	N/A	

=== All-Star weekend ===
On January 6, 2026, the Chatham-Kent Barnstormers were announced as the host team for the 2026 CBL All-Star Weekend. The skills competition and home run derby was on July 11th, with the All-Star Game played on July 12th at Fergie Jenkins Field.

July 12, 2026 2:06 PM at Fergie Jenkins Field, Chatham-Kent, Ontario
Team	1	2	3	4	5	6	7	8	9	R	H	E
North All-Stars	1	1	2	0	0	0	1	0	3	8	11	3
South All-Stars	3	0	0	0	0	1	0	0	0	4	7	2
WP: Nick Veselinovic LP: Dustin Davidson

== Standings ==
2026 Canadian Baseball League standings Final standings
Team	W	L	PCT	GB	HOME	AWAY
y-Hamilton Cardinals	31	17	.646	–	18–6	13–11
x-London Majors	31	17	.646	–	17–7	14–10
x-Welland Jackfish	31	17	.646	–	17–7	14–10
x-Guelph Royals	29	19	.604	2	16–8	13–11
x-Barrie Baycats	27	21	.563	4	12–12	15–9
Brantford Red Sox	21	27	.438	10	14–10	7–17
Kitchener Panthers	16	32	.333	15	8–16	8–16
Toronto Maple Leafs	15	32	.319	15.5	9–15	6–17
Chatham-Kent Barnstormers	14	33	.298	16.5	9–14	5–19

== League leaders ==
as of September 12, 2026

Hitting leaders
Stat	Player	Team	Total
AVG	(Canada) Malik Williams	Kitchener	.417
OPS	(Cuba) Yasiel Puig	Toronto	1.454
HR	(Cuba) Yasiel Puig	Toronto	24
RBI	(United States) Ethan Mann	Welland	71
R	(Japan) Daiki Abe	Welland	62
H	(Dominican Republic) Maikol Escotto	London	86
SB	(Japan) Daiki Abe	Welland	40

Pitching leaders
Stat	Player	Team	Total
W	(Canada) Travis Keys (Dominican Republic) Victor Payano (Dominican Republic) Carlos Sano	London; London; Barrie	8
ERA	(Dominican Republic) Hector Yan	Hamilton	2.60
K	(Dominican Republic) Hector Yan	Hamilton	112
IP	(Dominican Republic) Victor Payano	London	85.1
SV	(Colombia) Kevin Escorcia (Canada) Skylar Janisse	Guelph; London	10
WHIP	(Dominican Republic) Hector Yan	Hamilton	1.10

== Playoff bracket ==
Qualification game
4	Guelph	2
5	Barrie	4

League semi-finals
1	Hamilton	4
5	Barrie	2
2	London	2
3	Welland	4

Dominico Cup finals
1	Hamilton	0
3	Welland	4

=== Qualification game ===
September 1, 2026 7:09 pm at Hastings Stadium, Guelph, Ontario
Team	1	2	3	4	5	6	7	8	9	R	H	E
Barrie Baycats	2	0	1	0	0	0	0	1	0	4	12	0
Guelph Royals	1	0	0	1	0	0	0	0	0	2	10	2
WP: Frank Garces LP: Edgar Garcia Sv: Carlos Sano

=== Semi-finals ===
==== (1) Hamilton Cardinals vs. (5) Barrie Baycats ====
Hamilton won the series, 4–2.

Game	Date	Score	Location	Time	Attendance
1	September 4	Barrie – 5, Hamilton – 7	Bernie Arbour Memorial Stadium	2:58	N/A
2	September 5	Hamilton – 4, Barrie – 1	Athletic Kulture Stadium	2:27	N/A
3	September 6	Barrie – 13, Hamilton – 6	Bernie Arbour Memorial Stadium	3:10	N/A
4	September 10	Hamilton – 7, Barrie – 2	Athletic Kulture Stadium	3:00	N/A
5	September 11	Barrie – 10, Hamilton – 6	Bernie Arbour Memorial Stadium	3:37	N/A
6	September 12	Hamilton – 5, Barrie – 4 (11 innings)	Athletic Kulture Stadium	3:37	N/A

==== (2) London Majors vs. (3) Welland Jackfish ====
Welland won the series, 4–2.

Game	Date	Score	Location	Time	Attendance
1	September 4	Welland – 5, London – 6 (11 innings)	Labatt Park	4:06	N/A
2	September 5	London – 5, Welland – 4	Welland Stadium	3:49	N/A
3	September 6	Welland – 6, London – 5	Labatt Park	3:00	N/A
4	September 10	London – 1, Welland – 13	Welland Stadium	3:29	N/A
5	September 11	Welland – 5, London – 2	Labatt Park	3:00	N/A
6	September 12	London – 6, Welland – 15	Welland Stadium	3:26	N/A

=== Dominico Cup finals ===
==== (1) Hamilton Cardinals vs. (3) Welland Jackfish ====
Welland won the series, 4–0.

Game	Date	Score	Location	Time	Attendance
1	September 18	Welland – 6, Hamilton – 1	Bernie Arbour Memorial Stadium	3:04	N/A
2	September 19	Hamilton – 2, Welland – 6	Welland Stadium	2:42	N/A
3	September 20	Welland – 7, Hamilton – 5	Bernie Arbour Memorial Stadium	3:00	N/A
4	September 23	Hamilton – 2, Welland – 4	Welland Stadium	2:39	N/A

== Transactions ==
Signings
Date	Player	Position	Current team	Previous team	Notes	Ref
December 5, 2025	Marcos Castillo	OF	Guelph Royals	Texas Tailgaters (BBCL)	Free agency	
December 5, 2025	Yosvani Peñalver	OF	Kitchener Panthers	Kitchener Panthers	Re-signed	
December 5, 2025	Ryan Rijo	IF/DH	Barrie Baycats	Barrie Baycats	Re-signed	
December 9, 2025	Yunior Ibarra	C	Kitchener Panthers	Kitchener Panthers	Re-signed	
December 15, 2025	Alfred Vega	RHP	Guelph Royals	St. Lucie Mets (FSL)	Free agency	
December 15, 2025	Gianfranco Morello	OF	Welland Jackfish	Welland Jackfish	Re-signed	
December 15, 2025	Zane Skansi	UTIL	Kitchener Panthers	Okotoks Dawgs (WCBL)	Free agency	
December 18, 2025	Trent Lawson	OF	Kitchener Panthers	Kitchener Panthers	Re-signed	
December 23, 2025	Frank Garcés	LHP	Barrie Baycats	Barrie Baycats	Re-signed	
December 24, 2025	Adam Odd	IF	Barrie Baycats	Barrie Baycats	Re-signed	
December 25, 2025	Canice Ejoh	OF	Barrie Baycats	Trois-Rivières Aigles (FL)	Free agency	
December 26, 2025	Juan Benítez	RHP	Barrie Baycats	Barrie Baycats	Re-signed	
December 27, 2025	Raffi Gross Jr	OF	Kitchener Panthers	Portland Mavericks (MIBL)	Free agency	
December 29, 2025	Francisco Hernandez	IF	Barrie Baycats	Barrie Baycats	Re-signed	
December 29, 2025	Jonah Weisner	IF	Welland Jackfish	Welland Jackfish	Re-signed	
December 30, 2025	Nolan Machibroda	IF	Barrie Baycats	Barrie Baycats	Re-signed	
December 31, 2025	Elian Serrata	RHP	Kitchener Panthers	FCL Marlins (FCL)	Free agency	
January 2, 2026	Noah Hull	IF	Barrie Baycats	Barrie Baycats	Re-signed	
January 5, 2025	Petey Kiefer	IF	Kitchener Panthers	Kitchener Panthers	Re-signed	
January 5, 2025	Carlos Sano	RHP	Barrie Baycats	Barrie Baycats	Re-signed	
January 6, 2026	Braedan Pakkala	LHP	Barrie Baycats	Barrie Baycats	Re-signed	
January 7, 2026	Eduardo De Oleo	C	London Majors	London Majors	Re-signed	
January 7, 2026	Brad Grieveson	RHP	Barrie Baycats	Barrie Baycats	Re-signed	
January 8, 2026	Bawin Colon	RHP	Kitchener Panthers	DSL Rangers Blue (DSL)	Free agency	
January 8, 2026	Clayton Keyes	OF	Barrie Baycats	Barrie Baycats	Re-signed	
January 9, 2026	James Smibert	IF	Welland Jackfish	Welland Jackfish	Re-signed	
January 12, 2026	Yosuke Fujie	IF	Kitchener Panthers	Kitchener Panthers	Re-signed	
January 12, 2026	Hayden Jaco	IF	Barrie Baycats	Barrie Baycats	Re-signed	
January 12, 2026	Skylar Janisse	RHP	London Majors	London Majors	Re-signed	
January 12, 2026	Carson Johnson	IF	Welland Jackfish	UT Permian Basin (LSC)	Free agency	
January 14, 2026	Travis Keys	LHP	London Majors	London Majors	Re-signed	
January 15, 2026	Owen Ozanich	RHP	Welland Jackfish	Barracudas de Montpellier (Division Élite)	Free agency	
January 15, 2026	Josh Williams	DH	Kitchener Panthers	Hamilton Cardinals	Free agency	
January 16, 2026	Victor Payano	LHP	London Majors	London Majors	Re-signed	
January 18, 2026	Ryan Capuano	RHP	Toronto Maple Leafs	Marshall University (SBC)	Free agency	
January 19, 2026	Owen MacNeil	RHP	Kitchener Panthers	Kitchener Panthers	Re-signed	
January 19, 2026	Tucker Zdunich	OF	London Majors	London Majors	Re-signed	
January 20, 2026	Jacob Bonzon	OF	Toronto Maple Leafs	Roanoke College (ODAC)	Free agency	
January 20, 2026	Evan Morrison	IF	Chatham-Kent Barnstormers	Chatham-Kent Barnstormers	Re-signed	
January 21, 2026	Kade Douglas	RHP	London Majors	Wausau Woodchucks (NWDS)	Free agency	
January 21, 2026	Brandon Hupé	OF	Welland Jackfish	Welland Jackfish	Re-signed	
January 21, 2026	Brendan Luther	IF	Welland Jackfish	Welland Jackfish	Re-signed	
January 21, 2026	Yuri O'Connor–Yokoyama	LHP	Chatham-Kent Barnstormers	Chatham-Kent Barnstormers	Re-signed	
January 21, 2026	Ben Sterritt	OF	Toronto Maple Leafs	Ohio Christian University (NCCAA)	Free agency	
January 22, 2026	Garret Day	RHP	Chatham-Kent Barnstormers	Chatham-Kent Barnstormers	Re-signed	
January 22, 2026	Samuel Quintana	LHP	Kitchener Panthers	Atleticos de Puerto Plata (LNBV)	Free agency	
January 22, 2026	Cooper Tomkinson	UTIL	Toronto Maple Leafs	Union Commonwealth University (AAC)	Free agency	
January 23, 2026	Kirk Gibson	IF	Toronto Maple Leafs	University of Toronto (OUA)	Free agency	
January 23, 2026	Zac Laird	LHP	London Majors	Saskatoon Berries (WCBL)	Free agency	
January 23, 2026	Tyler Plumpton	C	Barrie Baycats	Barrie Baycats	Re-signed	
January 24, 2026	Mike Cecchetto	IF	Toronto Maple Leafs	Toronto Maple Leafs	Re-signed	
January 24, 2026	Thibault Mercadier	RHP	Chatham-Kent Barnstormers	Huskies de Rouen (Division Élite)	Free agency	
January 25, 2026	Marek Deska	RHP	Guelph Royals	Toronto Maple Leafs	Free agency	
January 25, 2026	Vasili Kaloudis	IF	Toronto Maple Leafs	Birmingham-Bloomfield Beavers (USPBL)	Free agency	
January 25, 2026	Ben Sitarenios	RHP/OF	Toronto Maple Leafs	Toronto Maple Leafs	Re-signed	
January 26, 2026	Reinaldo De Paula	RHP	Toronto Maple Leafs	New Jersey Jackals (FL)	Free agency	
January 26, 2026	Evan Elliott	RHP	Kitchener Panthers	Kitchener Panthers	Re-signed	
January 26, 2026	Trent Lenihan	IF	London Majors	Edmonton Riverhawks (WCL)	Free agency	
January 26, 2026	Juan Mejia	LHP	Barrie Baycats	Toros de Sincelejo (LPB)	Free agency	
January 27, 2026	Yordan Manduley	IF	Toronto Maple Leafs	Kitchener Panthers	Free agency	
January 27, 2026	Breidy Encarnacion	RHP	Barrie Baycats	Jupiter Hammerheads (FSL)	Free agency	
January 28, 2026	Roberto Caro	OF	London Majors	Tigres de Cartagena (LPB)	Free agency	
January 28, 2026	Edgar Figueroa	OF	Barrie Baycats	Tigres de Cartagena (LPB)	Free agency	
January 29, 2026	Ben Abram	RHP	Welland Jackfish	Welland Jackfish	Re-signed	
January 29, 2026	Jhon Javier	C	Toronto Maple Leafs	Toronto Maple Leafs	Re-signed	
January 29, 2026	Oscar Moreta	RHP	Barrie Baycats	DSL Orioles Orange (DSL)	Free agency	
January 29, 2026	Charlie Towers	IF	Kitchener Panthers	Kitchener Panthers	Re-signed	
January 30, 2026	Elvin Liriano	LHP	Guelph Royals	Indios del Bóer (LBPN)	Free agency	
January 30, 2026	Luis Pérez	RHP	London Majors	El Águila de Veracruz (LMB)	Free agency	
February 5, 2026	Branfy Infante	IF	Barrie Baycats	Barrie Baycats	Re-signed	
February 16, 2026	Tyler Duncan	OF	Hamilton Cardinals	Hamilton Cardinals	Re-signed	
February 17, 2026	Brandon Nicoll	IF	Hamilton Cardinals	Hamilton Cardinals	Re-signed	
February 17, 2026	Carlos Domínguez	OF	Hamilton Cardinals	Hamilton Cardinals	Re-signed	
February 18, 2026	Caleb Seroski	RHP	Hamilton Cardinals	Hamilton Cardinals	Re-signed	
February 18, 2026	Hector Yan	LHP	Hamilton Cardinals	Gigantes de Rivas (LBPN)	Free agency	
February 19, 2026	Freisis Adames	RHP	Hamilton Cardinals	Hamilton Cardinals	Re-signed	
February 19, 2026	Evan Magill	C	Hamilton Cardinals	Tennessee Wesleyan University (AAC)	Free agency	
February 23, 2026	Jacob Gajic	LHP	Hamilton Cardinals	Hamilton Cardinals	Re-signed	
February 24, 2026	Reyny Reyes	IF	Hamilton Cardinals	Arroceros Béisbol Club (LNBV)	Free agency	
February 26, 2026	Carson Barker	C	Barrie Baycats	Ottawa Titans (FL)	Free agency	
February 27, 2026	Justin Groves	OF	Barrie Baycats	Barrie Baycats	Re-signed	
March 24, 2026	Brandon Hernandez	IF	Barrie Baycats	Barrie Baycats	Re-signed (Note: Signed two year extension, first multi-year contract in league history.)	
March 25, 2026	Brendon Daley	IF	Barrie Baycats	Hamilton Cardinals	Free agency	
April 11, 2026	Aden Ryan	RHP	Chatham-Kent Barnstormers	Chatham-Kent Barnstormers	Re-signed	

Trades
Date	Details		Ref.
January 13, 2026	To Kitchener Panthers IF Malik Williams	To Barrie Baycats Player TBA; Cash considerations	
February 23, 2026	To Hamilton Cardinals RHP Danny Garcia	To Kitchener Panthers Cash considerations	
