= 2018 Intercounty Baseball League season =

2018 IBL season
- League: Intercounty Baseball League
- Sport: Baseball
- Duration: May 6, 2018-3 August 2018; 8 August 2018-6 September 2018 (playoff)
- Games: 144
- Teams: 8

Regular season
- Season champions: Barrie Baycats

IBL playoff

Jack and Lynne Dominico Trophy
- Champions: Barrie Baycats
- Runners-up: Kitchener Panthers
- Finals MVP: Glenn Jackson (Barrie Baycats)

2018 Intercounty Baseball League season was the 100th season of the Intercounty Baseball League (IBL). It started on May 6 and ended on September 6.

The Barrie Baycats won their fifth consecutive IBL title, and sixth title overall.

== Teams ==
- Barrie Baycats
- Brantford Red Sox#
- Burlington Herd
- Guelph Royals#
- Hamilton Cardinals
- Kitchener Panthers#
- London Majors
- Toronto Maple Leafs

The teams with # will celebrate the 100th anniversary since the League formed.

== Standing ==
- All teams qualify for the playoff.
- The game between Barrie and Toronto was cancelled.

	GP	W	L	pct	GB
Barrie Baycats (C)	35	27	8	.771	-
Kitchener Panthers	36	24	12	.667	3.5
London Majors	36	20	16	.556	7.5
Toronto Maple Leafs	35	16	19	.457	11
Guelph Royals	36	16	20	.444	11.5
Hamilton Cardinals	36	15	21	.417	12.5
Brantford Red Sox	36	13	23	.361	14.5
Burlington Herd	36	12	24	.333	15.5

== Playoffs ==
Quarterfinals
1	Barrie Baycats	3
8	Burlington Herd	0
3	London Majors	1
6	Hamilton Cardinals	3
4	Toronto Maple Leafs	3
5	Guelph Royals	2
2	Kitchener Panthers	3
7	Brantford Red Sox	0

Semifinals
1	Barrie Baycats	4
6	Hamilton Cardinals	0
4	Toronto Maple Leafs	0
2	Kitchener Panthers	4

Jack and Lynne Dominico Trophy
1	Barrie Baycats	4
2	Kitchener Panthers	2

== Jack and Lynne Dominico Trophy: Barrie Baycats (7-0) vs Kitchener Panthers (7-0) ==
=== Game 1 ===
August 28, 2018 7:38pm EDT at Coates Stadium in Barrie End time: 10:53pm, Duration: 3h15min
Team	1	2	3	4	5	6	7	8	9	10	11	R	H	E
Kitchener Panthers	0	0	0	0	0	0	0	0	0	0	1	1	10	1
Barrie Baycats	0	0	0	0	0	0	0	0	0	0	0	0	1	0
WP: Mike Schnurr (2-0) LP: Chris Nagorski (0-1) Sv: Miguel Lahera (1)

Kitchener leads the series 1-0

=== Game 2 ===
August 30, 2018 7:33pm EDT at Jack Couch Stadium in Kitchener End time: 10:52pm, Duration: 3h19min
Team	1	2	3	4	5	6	7	8	9	R	H	E
Barrie Baycats	0	0	0	1	2	0	3	0	0	6	8	2
Kitchener Panthers	1	0	0	2	0	0	0	0	1	4	13	1
WP: Emilis Guerrero (1-0) LP: Jonder Martinez (1-1) Sv: Chris Nagorski (2); Home runs: BAR: Jordan Castaldo (1); KIT: Mike Gordner (3)

Barrie ties the series 1-1

=== Game 3 ===
September 1, 2018 7:10pm EDT at Coates Stadium in Barrie End time: 9:46pm, Duration: 2h36min
Team	1	2	3	4	5	6	7	8	9	R	H	E
Kitchener Panthers	0	0	1	0	0	0	0	1	0	2	8	1
Barrie Baycats	0	0	0	0	2	0	0	2	x	4	7	1
WP: Adam Hawes (1-0) LP: Matt Vickers (0-1); Home runs: KIT: none BAR: none

Barrie leads the series 2-1

=== Game 4 ===
September 2, 2018 7:03pm EDT at Jack Couch Stadium in Kitchener End time: 9:51pm, Duration: 2h48min
Team	1	2	3	4	5	6	7	8	9	10	R	H	E
Barrie Baycats	1	0	0	0	0	0	1	0	0	0	2	8	0
Kitchener Panthers	0	0	0	0	1	0	1	0	0	1	3	12	0
WP: Mike Schnurr (3-0) LP: Chris Nagorski (0-2); Home runs: BAR: Jordan Castaldo (2); KIT: Mike Andrulis (1)

Kitchener ties the series 2-2

=== Game 5 ===
September 4, 2018 7:35pm EDT at Coates Stadium in Barrie End time: 10:01pm, Duration: 2h26min
Team	1	2	3	4	5	6	7	8	9	R	H	E
Kitchener Panthers	0	0	0	0	0	0	1	0	0	1	4	2
Barrie Baycats	0	0	0	4	0	0	1	2	x	7	12	0
WP: Matthew St. Kitts (3-0) LP: Jonder Martinez (1-2) Sv: Emilis Guerrero (1); Home runs: KIT: none BAR: none

Barrie leads the series 3-2

=== Game 6 ===
September 6, 2018 7:31pm EDT at Jack Couch Stadium in Kitchener End time: 10:23pm, Duration: 2h52min
Team	1	2	3	4	5	6	7	8	9	R	H	E
Barrie Baycats	0	2	0	0	0	0	4	0	0	6	8	1
Kitchener Panthers	1	0	0	0	2	0	0	0	0	3	9	0
WP: Santos Arias (3-0) LP: Mike Schnurr (3-1) Sv: Adam Hawes (1); Home runs: BAR: Starlin Rodriguez (1), Kyle DeGrace (1), Glenn Jackson (1); KIT: none Attendance: 1900

Barrie wins the series 4-2

== Stats ==
- Regular season
  - Battling
    - Average: .403 (48 hits-119 at bats, Jordan Castaldo, BAR)
    - Hit: 49 (both Grant Arnold, HAM and Justin Gideon, BUR)
    - Home run: 12 (both Sean Reilly, GUE and Cleveland Brownlee, LDN)
    - Double: 14 (Jordan Castaldo, BAR)
    - Triple: 4 (Vaughn Bryan, BUR)
    - Run: 40 (Jordan Castaldo, BAR)
    - RBI: 46 (Cleveland Brownlee, LDN)
  - Pitching
    - ERA: 0.38 (47 IP-3 ER, Frank Garces, BAR)
    - Win: 8 (both 2 lose, Starlin Peralta, LDN and Emilis Guerrero, BAR)
    - Strikeout: 112 (Edwin Javier, GUE)
    - Save: 8 (Miguel Lahera, KIT)
    - IP: 85.2 (Yunior Yambatis, GUE)
  - Fielding
    - Put out: 272 (Nic Burdett, BRA)
    - Assist: 106 (Yorbis Borroto, KIT)
    - Percentage: 1.000 (160 players tied)
- Playoff
  - Battling
    - Average: .444 (4 hits-9 at bats, [[]] and [[]] both [[]])
    - Hit:
    - Home run:
    - Double:
    - Triple:
    - Run:
    - RBI:
  - Pitching
    - ERA:
    - Win:
    - Strikeout:
    - Save:
    - IP:
  - Fielding
    - Put out:
    - Assist:
    - Percentage:

== Awards ==
- Jack and Lynne Dominico Trophy
- John Bell Memorial Trophy
- Brian Kerr Memorial Trophy
