= List of Dominico Cup champions =

The Dominico Cup is the trophy awarded to the champion of the Canadian Baseball League, formerly known as the Intercounty Baseball League (1919–2025). The team with most championships (16) are the Stratford Nationals/Kraven Knits/Hillers.

== List ==
Year	Winning team	Finalist	Result (best-of 7)
1919	Guelph Maple Leafs	Galt Terriers	
1920	Guelph Maple Leafs	Galt Terriers	
1921	Guelph Maple Leafs	Galt Terriers	
1922	Galt Terriers	Guelph Maple Leafs	
1923	Galt Terriers	Guelph Maple Leafs	
1924	Galt Terriers	Guelph Maple Leafs	
1925	London Braves	Preston	
1926	St. Thomas Elgins	Galt Terriers	
1927	Galt Terriers	Guelph Maple Leafs	
1928	Galt Terriers	St. Thomas Elgins	
1929	Galt Terriers	Twin City Panthers	
1930	Galt Terriers	Twin City Panthers	
1931	Galt Terriers	Guelph Maple Leafs	
1932	Guelph Maple Leafs	Twin City Panthers	
1933	St. Thomas Elgins	Guelph Maple Leafs	
1934	Stratford Nationals	London Winery	
1935	Galt Terriers	Stratford Nationals	
1936	London Silverwoods	Brantford Red Sox	
1937	London Silverwoods	Stratford Nationals	
1938	Stratford Nationals	London Seniors	
1939	Stratford Nationals	Brantford Red Sox	
1940	Stratford Nationals		
1941	Waterloo Tigers		
1942	Stratford Nationals		
1943	London Army Team		
1944	London Majors		
1945	London Majors		
1946	Stratford Nationals	London Majors	
1947	London Majors		
1948	London Majors	Waterloo Tigers	4-0
1949	Brantford Red Sox	Waterloo Tigers	Best of Nine
1950	Waterloo Tigers	Brantford Red Sox	
1951	London Majors	Brantford Red Sox	
1952	Kitchener Panthers	Brantford Red Sox	
1953	Kitchener Panthers	Waterloo Tigers	5-3
1954	St. Thomas Elgins	Galt Terriers	
1955	St. Thomas Elgins	Oshawa Merchants	4-1
1956	London Majors	Oshawa Motors	
1957	Kitchener-Waterloo Dutchmen	Listowel Legionnaires	4-3
1958	St. Thomas Elgins	Galt Terriers	4-3
1959	Brantford Red Sox	Galt Terriers	4-1
1960	Brantford Red Sox	Hamilton Cardinals	4-1
1961	Brantford Red Sox	Kitchener Panthers	
1962	Brantford Red Sox	Guelph Royals	4-1
1963	Brantford Red Sox	Kitchener-Waterloo Panthers	4-3
1964	Galt Terriers	London Pontiacs	4-3
1965	Brantford Red Sox	Guelph C-Joys	4-2
1966	Galt Terriers	London Pontiacs	4-2
1967	Kitchener-Waterloo Panthers	Guelph Royals	4-0
1968	Kitchener-Waterloo Panthers	Hamilton Red Wings	
1969	London Pontiacs	Stratford Hoods	4-3
1970	Guelph C-Joys	Kitchener-Waterloo Panthers	4-3
1971	Kitchener-Waterloo Panthers	Guelph C-Joys	4-0
1972	Toronto Maple Leafs	Brantford Red Sox	4-3
1973	Kitchener-Waterloo Panthers	Stratford Kraven Knits	4-2
1974	Stratford Kraven Knits	Brantford Red Sox	4-1
1975	London Majors	Guelph Forums	4-2
1976	Stratford Hillers	London Majors	4-3
1977	Stratford Hillers	Brantford Red Sox	4-3
1978	Hamilton Cardinals	London Majors	4-2
1979	Cambridge Terriers	Stratford Hillers	4-0
1980	Stratford Hillers	Brantford Red Sox	4-2
1981	Brantford Red Sox	Kitchener Panthers	4-2
1982	Toronto Maple Leafs	London Majors	4-2
1983	Cambridge Terriers	Kitchener Panthers	4-1
1984	St. Thomas Elgins	Toronto Maple Leafs	4-1
1985	Toronto Maple Leafs	St. Thomas Elgins	4-1
1986	Stratford Hillers	Toronto Maple Leafs	4-2
1987	Stratford Hillers	Niagara Falls Mariners	4-0
1988	Toronto Maple Leafs	Stratford Hillers	4-3
1989	Stratford Hillers	Toronto Maple Leafs	4-0
1990	Kitchener Panthers	Brantford Red Sox	4-1
1991	Stratford Hillers	Kitchener Panthers	4-1
1992	Stratford Hillers	Guelph Royals	4-3
1993	Guelph Royals	Toronto Maple Leafs	4-2
1994	Stratford Hillers	Guelph Royals	4-3
1995	Toronto Maple Leafs	Stratford Hillers	4-3
1996	Kitchener Panthers	Toronto Maple Leafs	4-2
1997	Guelph Royals	Toronto Maple Leafs	4-0
1998	Kitchener Panthers	Toronto Maple Leafs	4-3
1999	Toronto Maple Leafs	Kitchener Panthers	4-3
2000	Kitchener Panthers	Guelph Royals	4-1
2001	Kitchener Panthers	Toronto Maple Leafs	4-3
2002	Toronto Maple Leafs	Hamilton Cardinals	4-1
2003	Guelph Royals	Brantford Red Sox	4-3
2004	Guelph Royals	London Majors	4-1
2005	Barrie Baycats	Toronto Maple Leafs	4-2
2006	Brantford Red Sox	London Majors	4-1
2007	Toronto Maple Leafs	Brantford Red Sox	4-3
2008	Brantford Red Sox	London Majors	4-3
2009	Brantford Red Sox	Barrie Baycats	4-0
2010	Brantford Red Sox	Barrie Baycats	4-2
2011	Brantford Red Sox	Ottawa Fat Cats	4-1
2012	Brantford Red Sox	Barrie Baycats	4-0
2013	Brantford Red Sox	Barrie Baycats	4-3
2014	Barrie Baycats	London Majors	4-0
2015	Barrie Baycats	Kitchener Panthers	4-1
2016	Barrie Baycats	Toronto Maple Leafs	4-0
2017	Barrie Baycats	Kitchener Panthers	4-0
2018	Barrie Baycats	Kitchener Panthers	4-2
2019	Barrie Baycats	Kitchener Panthers	4-2
2020	Not awarded Due to COVID-19 pandemic	N/A	N/A
2021	London Majors	Toronto Maple Leafs	3-2
2022	London Majors	Toronto Maple Leafs	4-2
2023	Welland Jackfish	Barrie Baycats	4-2
2024	Barrie Baycats	Guelph Royals	4-0
2025	Welland Jackfish	Barrie Baycats	4-1
2026	Welland Jackfish	Hamilton Cardinals	4-0

*Source: Intercounty Baseball League 2011 Information Guide &i Record Book

== Championships by Team ==
Team	Number of Championships
Barrie Baycats	8
Brantford Red Sox	15
Cambridge (Galt) Terriers	13
Guelph C-Joys/Maple Leafs/Royals	9
Hamilton Cardinals	1
Kitchener Panthers/Dutchmen	12
London Majors/Pontiacs	14
St. Thomas Elgins	6
Stratford Hillers/Kraven Knits/Nationals	16
Toronto Maple Leafs	8
Welland Jackfish	3
Waterloo Tigers	2
