= Kraven =

Kraven may refer to:

- Kraven the Hunter, a supervillain from Marvel Comics
  - Kraven the Hunter (Alyosha Kravinoff), a fictional comic book character and illegitimate son of the above-mentioned, both sharing the same name
  - Kraven the Hunter (film), 2024 film based on the Marvel character
- Vanessa Kraven, a professional wrestler
- Kraven, a fictional vampire and main antagonist of the first film in the Underworld film series

== See also ==
- Stratford Kraven Knits, former name of a baseball team based in Stratford, Ontario, Canada
