= Barrie Baycats =

Professional independent baseball team in Barrie, Ontario, Canada

- Logo

Information
- League: Canadian Baseball League
- Location: Barrie, Ontario
- Ballpark: Athletic Kulture Stadium
- Founded: 2001
- Nickname: 'Cats
- League championships: 8: 2005; 2014; 2015; 2016; 2017; 2018; 2019; 2024
- Colours: White, Night Blue, Red
- Mascot: Cool Cat Junior
- Retired numbers: 16 - Ryan Spataro, 24 - Brad Bissell 31- Angus Roy, 42 -Jeff Cowan 10 -Glenn Jackson
- President: Josh Matlow
- Manager: Josh Matlow
- Website: http://www.barriebaycats.com/home

Current uniforms
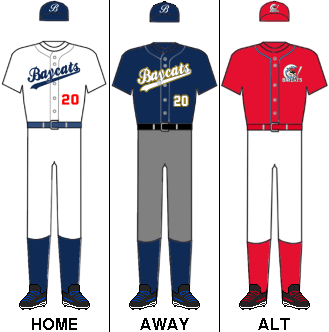
Barrie Baycats Uniforms

The Barrie Baycats are an independent, professional baseball team of the Canadian Baseball League based in Barrie, Ontario. They play their home games at Athletic Kulture Stadium at the Barrie Community Sports Complex in Midhurst.

== History ==
=== Pre-Baycats (1999-2000) ===
In 1999, the Intercounty Baseball League awarded the city of Barrie and Gary Calvert with a franchise with the intent that they would start operations in the 2001 Season. In 2000, the city of Barrie would purchase a plot of land in the town of Midhurst to build the new stadium for the team, with it being completed just before May 2001. The Baycats name would be adopted after the team board put out an ad in a local newspaper to get suggestions for the team's name. Just before the team was set to begin the 2001 season, the at the time team owner went bankrupt, causing the then-team president David Mills to find a new owner, Gary Inskeep.

=== Early Years (2001-2008) ===
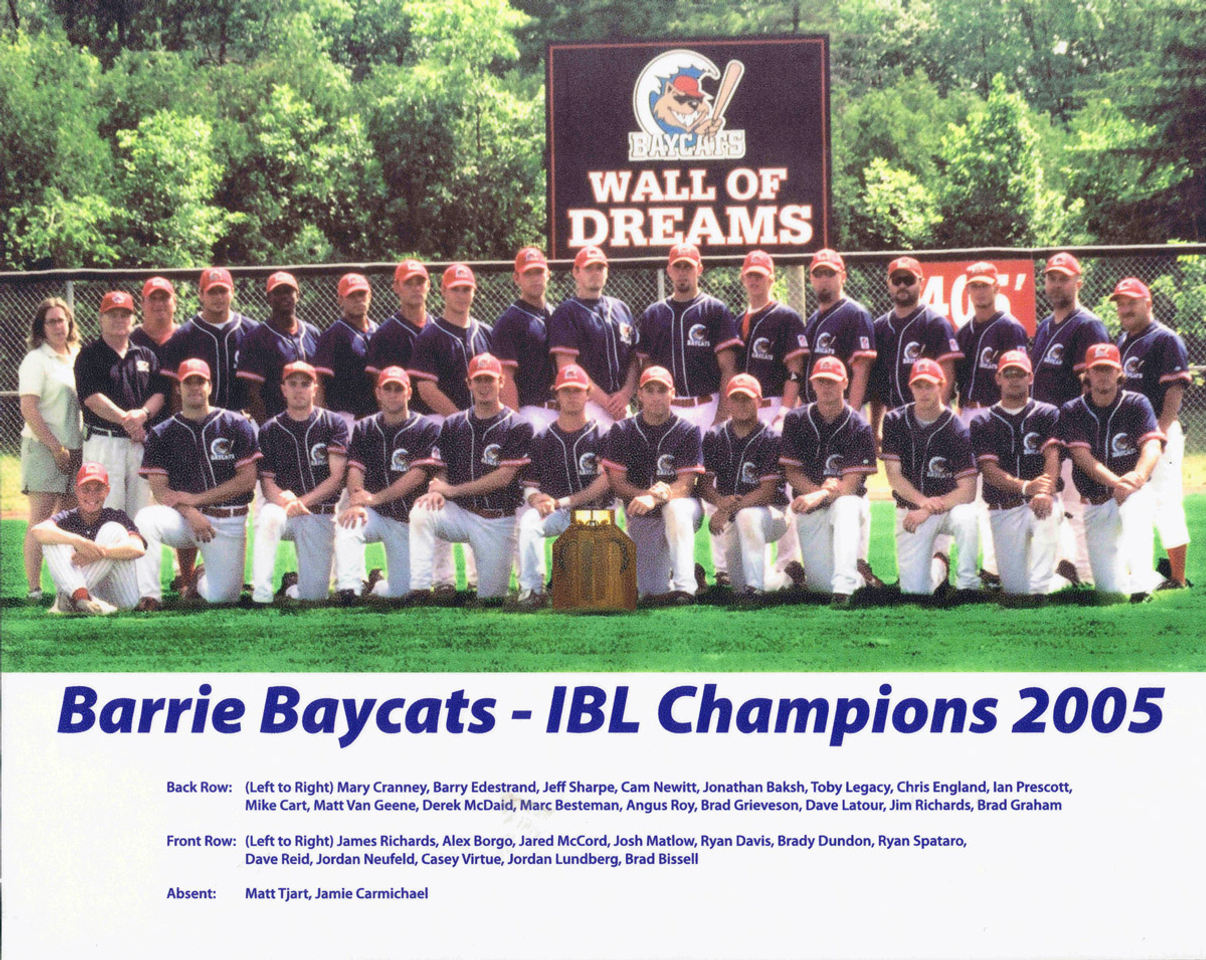
Barrie Baycats 2005 Championship Picture

The Barrie Baycats baseball club was born on May 12, 2001, when they played their first ever game against the Toronto Maple Leafs. The Baycats first win in team history would come on June 2, 2001, against the Kitchener Panthers with a 9–3 victory. The Baycats would make their first playoff appearance in the 2002 season, after finishing 4th place with a 19–17 record. In 2005 the Baycats would win their first IBL Championship, beating Toronto in 6 games. The next season Barrie would take first place in the IBL with a 26-10 Record, they would lose in the semifinals in the playoffs that year.

== Roster ==
Barrie Baycats roster
Active roster	Coaching staff
Pitchers: 30 (Dominican Republic) Juan Benítez; 14 (Dominican Republic) Breidy Encarnacion ‡; 97 (Dominican Republic) Frank Garcés; 12 (Canada) Brad Grieveson; 43 (Dominican Republic) Juan Mejia; 54 (Dominican Republic) Oscar Moreta; 45 (Canada) Braedan Pakkala; -- (Dominican Republic) Naswell Paulino; -- (Dominican Republic) Ronny Rosario; 17 (Dominican Republic) Carlos Sano; 94 (Mexico) Saul Vasquez; -- (Czech Republic) Boris Vecerka; -- (Canada) Johnathan Warden; Utility players: 47 (Canada) Brendon Daley; 28 (Canada) Noah Hull; 55 (Canada) Hayden Jaco; Catchers: 32 (Canada) Carson Barker; 21 (Dominican Republic) Wandy Ciprian; 44 (Canada) Tyler Plumpton; 29 (Canada) Kristyan Puyol-Genossar; Infielders: 11 (Canada) Brandon Hernandez; 0 (Canada) Francisco Hernandez; 20 (Canada) Nolan Machibroda; 26 (Canada) Adam Odd; 27 (Canada) Ryan Rijo; Outfielders: 7 (Canada) Canice Ejoh; 13 (Dominican Republic) Edgar Figueroa ‡; 8 (Dominican Republic) Branfy Infante; 23 (Canada) Clayton Keyes; 95 (Canada) Noel Mcgarry Doyle; -- (Canada) Zachary Owen	Manager: -- (Canada) Josh Matlow; Coaches: -- (Canada) Andrew White (assistant coach); -- (Canada) Jeremy Uylenbroek (assistant coach); -- (Canada) Brad Grieveson (pitching coach); Roster updated on July 28, 2026: Disabled list; ‡ Inactive list; § Suspended list

== Regular season results ==
=== Table Key ===
IBL champions †	IBL Finalists *	Semifinals ^	Best Record ¤

=== Seasons ===
Season	Finish	Wins	Losses	Win%	GB	Postseason
2001	8th	13	19	.451	-	Did not qualify
2002	4th	19	17	.528	-	Losts Semifinals (Toronto Maple Leafs)
2003	8th	15	21	.417	-	Did not qualify
2004	4th	20	16	.556	-	Lost Quarterfinals (Guelph Royals)
2005	3rd	21	15	.583	-	Won Finals (Toronto Maple Leafs)
2006	1st	26	10	.722	-	Losts Semifinals (London Majors)
2007	2nd	17	19	.472	-	Lost Quarterfinals (Guelph Royals)
2008	3rd	24	12	.667	-	Lost Semifinals (Oshawa Dodgers)
2009	2nd	26	10	.722	-	Lost Finals (Brantford Red Sox)
2010	3rd	21	15	.583	3	Lost Finals (Brantford Red Sox)
2011	1st	26	9	.743	-	Lost Semifinals (Ottawa Fat Cats)
2012	3rd	21	15	.583	8.5	Lost Finals (Brantford Red Sox)
2013	3rd	25	17	.595	8	Lost Finals (Brantford Red Sox)
2014	1st	30	6	.833	-	Won Finals (London Majors)
2015	1st	28	7	.800	-	Won Finals (Kitchener Panthers)
2016	3rd	25	11	.694	2.5	Won Finals (Toronto Maple Leafs)
2017	1st	33	3	.917	-	Won Finals (Kitchener Panthers) 4-0
2018	1st	27	8	.771	-	Won Quarterfinals (Burlington Bulls) 3–0; Won Semifinals (Hamilton Cardinals) 4–0; Won Finals (Kitchener Panthers) 4-2
2019	1st	26	11	.703	-	Won Quarterfinals (Brantford Red Sox) 4–0; Won Semifinals (Welland Jackfish) 4–0; Won Finals (Kitchener Panthers) 4-2
2020	Did not play due to COVID-19					
2021	5th	14	16	.467	8	Won Quarterfinals (Welland Jackfish) 2–0; Lost Semifinals (Toronto Maple Leafs) 2–0
2022	5th	21	20	.512	10	Lost Quarterfinals (Toronto Maple Leafs) 3–0
2023	3rd	26	16	.619	5	Won Quarterfinals (Hamilton Cardinals) 3–1; Won Semifinals (Kitchener Panthers) 3–0; Lost Finals (Welland Jackfish) 4–2
2024	2nd	27	15	.643	5	Won Quarterfinals (Toronto Maple Leafs) 3-0 Won Semifinals (London Majors) 3-0 Won Finals (Guelph Royals) 4-0
2025	2nd	24	18	.571	7	Won Quarterfinals (Toronto Maple Leafs) 3-2 Won Semifinals (Hamilton Cardinals) 4-0 Lost Finals (Welland Jackfish) 4–2
Regular season		555	326	.630	22 Postseason Appearances	
Playoff games		-	-	–	7 League Pennant	
Playoff series		31	14	.689	8 IBL Championships	

== Team accomplishments ==
- Championships: (8) (2005, 2014, 2015, 2016, 2017, 2018, 2019, 2024)
- Pennants: (7) (2006, 2009, 2011, 2014, 2015, 2017 and 2018)
- Best Regular-Season Win Percentage in Team History: .917 in 2017 (Intercounty Baseball League Record)
- Most Regular-Season Wins in Team History: 33 in 2017 (Ties an Intercounty Baseball League Record)
- Fewest Regular-Season Losses in Team History: 3 in 2017 (Ties an Intercounty Baseball League Record)
- Best Start in Team History: 26–0 in 2017 (Intercounty Baseball League Record)
- Longest Win Streak in Team History: 35 in 2016/Continued into 2017 (Intercounty Baseball League Record)
- Did Not Lose a Regular-Season Home Game Throughout the Entire 2017 Regular-Season
- Did Not Lose a Playoff Game Throughout the Entire 2017 Postseason (8-0)
- Did Not Lose a Playoff Game Throughout the Entire 2024 Postseason (10-0)
- Did Not Trail at the End of Any One Inning the Entire 2024 Postseason (93 Innings)
