= Marek Deska =

Guelph Royals
- Pitcher
- Born: August 24, 1985 (age 40); Toronto, Ontario, Canada
- Bats: Right Throws: Right

Marek Leszek Deska (born August 24, 1985) is a Polish-Canadian professional baseball pitcher for the Guelph Royals of the Canadian Baseball League.

In 2006, as a rookie in the Intercounty Baseball League, Deska acted as a reliever for the Toronto Maple Leafs and posted a 1–2 record with a 3.12 earned run average (ERA) while tallying 19 strikeouts in 17.1 innings of work.

In 2007, Deska played in the Dutch Major League (Honkbal Hoofdklasse) for Mediamonks RCH who made their first appearance in the top Dutch league in 6 years. Upon his first start, which was against Instant Holland Almere '90 on May 20, 2007, Deska became the first player in history to play in the highest Dutch league with a Polish passport.. Deska ended the season with a 3.70 ERA and boasted a 3–6 record. He finished in the top 10 in the league in pitching categories such as innings pitched, complete games and quality starts with 7 while finishing 12th in the league in total strikeouts. He fell to 2–8, 4.85 in 2008.

Deska has also pitched for the Polish national baseball team. In the 2008 European Championship Qualifiers, Deska allowed two runs and fanned 12 in 9 innings of work for Poland, leading the Prague qualifiers in K's; Poland failed to advance to the 2009 European Championship with a 2–2 record.
