= Ontario League =

The Ontario League was a Minor League Baseball league which operated in six Ontario cities in 1930.

== Teams ==
- Brantford Red Sox (Brantford, Ontario)
- Guelph Blitmores (Guelph, Ontario)
- Hamilton Tigers (Hamilton, Ontario)
- London Tecumsehs (London, Ontario)
- St. Catharines Brewers (St. Catharines, Ontario)
- St. Thomas Blue Sox (St. Thomas, Ontario)

Note: Hamilton disbanded after the first half of the season on July 3
