= St. Thomas Elgins =

Former minor league baseball team in St. Thomas, Ontario

Information
- League: Intercounty Baseball League (1948–61, 1963–96)
- Location: St. Thomas, Ontario
- Ballpark: Pinafore Park diamond, now Emslie Field
- Founded: 1948 (as the Legion; as Elgins in 1952)
- Disbanded: 1996
- League championships: 5: 1926; 1954; 1955; 1958; 1984
- Former name: St. Thomas Storm (2000–2003); Legion 1948–51

The St. Thomas Elgins were an independent, minor league baseball team of the semi-professional Intercounty Baseball League based in St. Thomas, Ontario, Canada. They began play as the St. Thomas Legion in 1948 and were renamed the Elgins in 1953; the team disappeared in 1961 and re-emerged as few years after and lasted until 1996. The team was folded in 1996 and were replaced by the Storm in 2000 and moved in 2004 as Stratford Nationals.

== Championships ==
Intercounty League

- 1926
- 1954
- 1955
- 1958
- 1984
