= Welland Jackfish =

Minor-league baseball team in Welland, Ontario, Canada

Logo
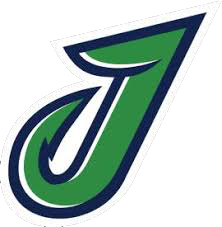
Cap insignia

Information
- League: Canadian Baseball League
- Location: Welland
- Ballpark: Welland Stadium
- Founded: 2019
- Nickname: Jackfish
- League championships: 3 (2023, 2025, 2026)
- Colours: Navy, green, white
- Mascot: Jacques
- President: Ryan Harrison
- General manager: Jason McKay
- Manager: Brian Essery
- Website: www.wellandjackfish.com

The Welland Jackfish are an independent minor-league baseball team based in Welland, Ontario, Canada. The Jackfish are a member of the Canadian Baseball League, an independent baseball league established in 1919 which is not affiliated with Major League Baseball. They are the defending back to back Dominico Cup champions, having claimed their 3rd title in 2026.

== History ==
The team traces its history to the Burlington Herd, an IBL team based in Burlington at Cosgrove Field from 2011 (as the Mississauga Twins) to 2018.

On October 2, 2018, the Herd were approved to relocate to Welland, and rebranded as the Welland Jackfish.

In their first year in Welland, the Jackfish set their best regular season record in franchise history with a 19–17 record, and earned their first playoff series victory defeating the London Majors 4-1.

Their second campaign in the Rose City saw the Jackfish finish 15–15 in a condensed 30-game 2021 season. They were swept in the first round of the playoffs.

During the 2023 season, the Jackfish won their first League Pennant in franchise history finishing with a 31-11 record. They carried this momentum into the Dominico Cup playoffs and on September 16, 2023, the Jackfish clinched their first Dominico Cup title in franchise history defeating the Barrie Baycats 4-2 in the best-of-seven series.

In front of a sellout crowd of 3,248 fans at ‘The Pond' aka Welland Stadium, the Jackfish captured its second Dominico Cup in three years defeating the Barrie Baycats 4-1 in the best-of-seven series.

== 2026 Roster ==
Welland Jackfish roster
Active roster		Coaching staff
Pitchers: 17 (Canada) Ben Abram (2nd-Team All-Star); 39 (Dominican Republic) Pedro De Los Santos; 33 (Canada) Daniel Howat; 18 (United States) Erik Johnson; 27 (Dominican Republic) Euclides Leyer; 41 (Dominican Republic) Deivy Mendez; 22 (Panama) Teodoro Ortega; 14 (Canada) Eric Pettipiece; 59 (Venezuela) Yoilan Quiñonez; 29 (Panama) Abdiel Saldana	Catchers: 10 (Canada) Logan Grant; 7 (Canada) Greg Marco; 23 (Panama) Robert Mullen; 2 (Canada) Ryan Potrecz; Infielders: 34 (United States) Greyson Barrett; 13 (Canada) Carson Johnson; 20 (Canada) Brendan Luther (2nd-Team All-Star); 15 (United States) Ethan Mann (2nd-Team All-Star); 5 (Canada) James Smibert (2nd-Team All-Star); 4 (Canada) Jonah Weisner; Outfielders: 6 (Japan) Daiki Abe (Rookie of the Year & 1st-Team All-Star); 25 (Canada) Justin Gideon; 52 (Canada) Tyson Gomm; 21 (Canada) Brandon Hupé; 11 (Canada) Gianfranco Morello	Manager: -- Brian Essery; Coaches: -- Pat Casey (assistant coach); -- Ricky Pillitteri (assistant coach); -- Ryan Bench (pitching coach); -- Trevor Kwolek (athletic trainer); -- Matty Bourque (equipment manager); -- Eric Marriott (scouting & player development); Disabled list; ‡ Inactive list; § Suspended list; updated July 27, 2026

*Inactive List: Bryce Arnold, James Bradwell, Justin Marra & Matteo Porcellato.

== Season-by-season results ==
=== Key ===
Champions †	Semifinals ^	League Best ¤	Franchise Record ‡

=== Seasons ===
Season	Finish	Wins	Losses	Win%	GB	Postseason
2019	4th	19	17	.528	6.5	Won Quarter-finals 4-1 against London Majors; Lost Semi-finals 4–0 to Barrie Baycats
2020	Season Cancelled due to COVID-19					
2021	4th	15	15	.500	7	Lost Quarter-finals 2-0 to Barrie Baycats
2022	3rd	31	11	.738	0.5	Won Quarter-finals 3-0 against Kitchener Panthers; Lost Semi-finals 3-2 to Toronto Maple Leafs
2023	1st	31	11	.738	-	Won Quarter-finals 3-0 against Brantford Red Sox; Won Semi-finals 3-2 against Toronto Maple Leafs; Won Dominico Cup Finals 4-2 against Barrie Baycats
2024	1st	32	10	.762	-	Won Quarter-finals 3-1 against Kitchener Panthers; Lost Semi-finals 3-2 to Guelph Royals
2025	1st	31	11	.738	-	Won Quarter-finals 3-0 against Kitchener Panthers; Won Semi-finals 3-2 against Guelph Royals; Won Dominico Cup Finals 4-1 against Barrie Baycats
2026	3rd	31	17	.646	-	Won Semi-finals 4-2 against London Majors; Won Dominico Cup Finals 4-0 against Hamilton Cardinals
Regular season		190	92	.674	3 League Pennants	
Playoff games		42	23	.646	7 Postseason Appearances	
Playoff series		11	4	.714	3 Dominico Cup Championships	
