= Kitchener Panthers =

Minor-league professional baseball team in Kitchener, Ontario

- Logo

Information
- League: Canadian Baseball League (1919–present)
- Location: Kitchener, Ontario
- Ballpark: Jack Couch Park Kitchener Memorial Auditorium Complex
- Founded: 1919
- Nickname: Panthers
- League championships: 13: 1941; 1950; 1952; 1957; 1967; 1968; 1971; 1973; 1990; 1996; 1998; 2000; 2001
- Former name: Kitchener Panthers (1960–present); KW Dutchmen; Kitchener Legionnaires; Kitchener Panthers (1919–1957)
- Former ballpark(s): Victoria Park, Downtown Kitchener
- Colours: Yellow, black
- President: Bill Pegg
- General manager: Mike Boehmer
- Manager: Bill Matetich
- Website: http://www.kitchenerpanthers.com

The Kitchener Panthers are an independent, minor league baseball team of the Canadian Baseball League based in Kitchener, Ontario. They play their home games at Jack Couch Park. The Panthers used to play at a ballpark in Victoria park before Jack Couch Park was built to replace the old Victoria Park stadium in 1967.

== History ==
The Panthers were a founding member of the Intercounty Baseball League (along with Galt, Guelph and Stratford in 1919). The team changed names when the current league began play in 1957 as the Legionnaires and Dutchmen, but reverted to the current name in 1960.

=== 2015 season ===
The Kitchener Panthers had a great start to the 2015 season, first defeating the Toronto Maple Leafs, followed by a great pitching performance the following week in Barrie, Ontario, defeating the Barrie Baycats. They then went on to defeat the Guelph Royals and Brantford Red Sox. They were in 2nd place after 4 games, going 4-0 only behind the London Majors, who started 7–0.

The Panthers' field was being reconstructed so even though their season started in early May, their home opener wasn't until May 28, 2015. In the home opener they played the Burlington Bandits and lost 8–7. Coach Tebo was ejected from the game for arguing a bad call by the umpire. The next Panthers game was on Friday, May 29, against the Hamilton Cardinals in Hamilton. The Panthers clinched the playoffs 2nd, and they faced the Hamilton Cardinals in the first round in 5 games. The second round went to 7 games against the London Majors. The Panthers won against them, so they will play the Barrie Baycats in the finals with game 1 beginning Tuesday, August 25. The Panthers lost the series 4 games to 1 and Barrie won its 2nd straight IBL Championship.

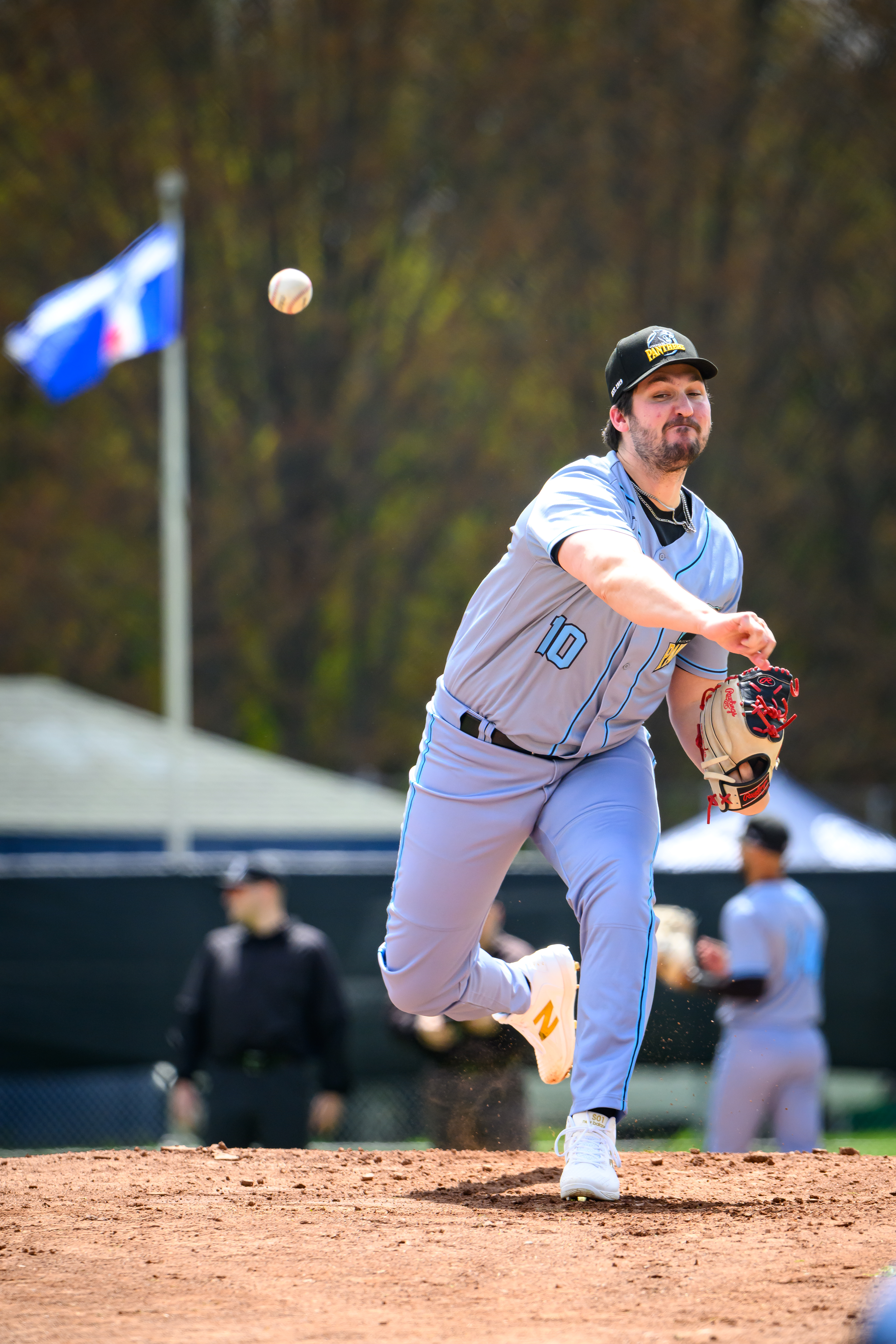
Owen MacNeil of the Panthers delivers a pitch during a May 10, 2026 game against the Toronto Maple Leafs.

== Championships ==
Kitchener has won thirteen championships, the second most in the league, behind the Brantford Red Sox with fifteen. The Panthers have won in:

- 1941
- 1950
- 1952
- 1957
- 1967
- 1968
- 1971
- 1973
- 1990
- 1996
- 1998
- 2000
- 2001

== Roster ==
Kitchener Panthers roster
Active roster	Coaching staff
Pitchers: 24 (Dominican Republic) Bawin Colon; 22 (Canada) Evan Elliott; 50 (Canada) Ben Hewitt; 45 (Canada) Cory Lawson ‡; 19 (United States) Jake Liberta; 10 (Canada) Owen MacNeil; 15 (Canada) Gavin McLean; -- (Dominican Republic) Jorge Minyety; -- (Cuba) Ernesto Punales; 54 (Dominican Republic) Samuel Quintana; 55 (Canada) Brett Reid; 30 (Dominican Republic) Elian Serrata ‡; Catchers: 16 (Canada) Cam Bauer; -- (Canada) Nick Hoyt; 48 (Cuba) Yunior Ibarra; Infielders: 30 (Canada) Matthew Fabian; 5 (Canada) Yosuke Fujie; 17 (United States) Petey Kiefer; 12 (United States) Zane Skansi; 8 (Canada) Josh Williams; 35 (Canada) Malik Williams; Outfielders: 2 (Canada) Jamie Cabral; 14 (Canada) Raffi Gross; 4 (Canada) Trent Lawson; 67 (Cuba) Yosvani Penalver; 1 (Canada) Mateo Zeppieri	Manager: Pete Kiefer; Coaches: Gian Franco Rizzo (pitching coach); Roster updated on July 3, 2026: Disabled list; ‡ Inactive list; § Suspended list

== Past players ==
- Bob McKillop - Chicago White Sox Organization 4-time ICBA MVP
- Gary Ebel - Oakland Athletics organization
- Ron Smith - San Francisco Giants organization
- Scott Medvin - Pittsburgh Pirates and Seattle Mariners
- Harry Psutka - Detroit Tigers
- Tom McKenzie - Canadian National Team
- Daniel Procopio - Houston Astros organization
- Yoanni Yera - Cuba national team and Mexican League

== Panthers Hall of Fame ==
1. 8 Tom Mckenzie 1966–1980
2. 9 Bob Mckillop 1966–1977
3. 10 Kevin Curran 1984–1999
4. 13 Jeff Pietrazko 1995–2014
5. 22 Randy Curran 1984–90, 95–2003
6. Tanner Nivins 2013–2019
