= Jack Couch Park =

Baseball stadium in Ontario, Canada

Coordinates: 43.4467°N 80.4642°W

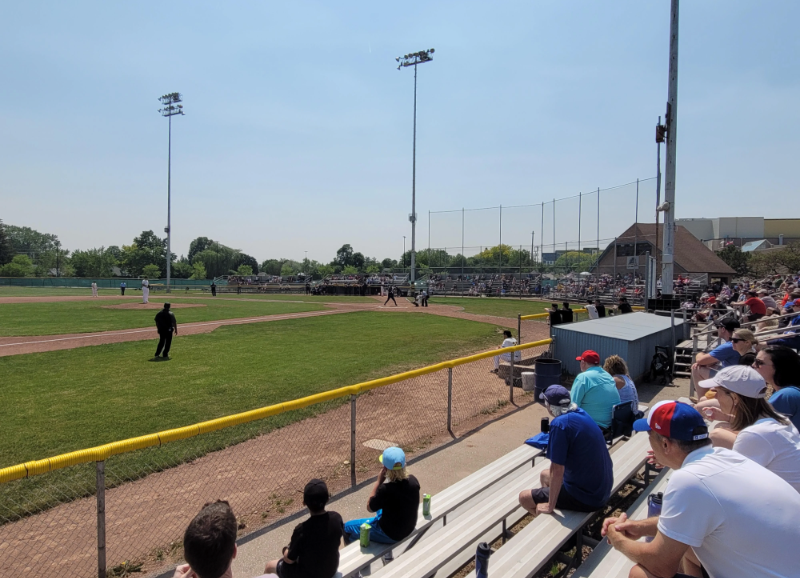
- Jack Couch in 2023
- Interactive map of Jack Couch Park
- Address: 400 East Avenue; Kitchener, Ontario; Canada
- Capacity: 1,400
- Surface: Grass
- Field size: Left field – 325 feet (99 m); Center field – 380 feet (120 m); Right field – 325 feet (99 m)

Construction
- Opened: 1967

Tenant
- Kitchener Panthers (CBL) (1967-present)

Jack Couch Park is a baseball stadium in Kitchener, Ontario, Canada, that serves as home of the Kitchener Panthers of the Canadian Baseball League. The stadium is located on the grounds of the Kitchener Memorial Auditorium.

The park was constructed in 1967 as part of Canada's centennial projects replacing a previous stadium in Victoria Park the team had called home since their inception

In 1993 The park was floated as a possible location for a Double-A Eastern League affiliate for either the Colorado Rockies or Miami Marlins, or a Single-A New York-Penn League affiliate of the St. Louis Cardinals but the plans never came to fruition

Prior to the 2025 season the park underwent significant upgrades including new dugouts, batting cages, seating, and a LED video board
