= Mississauga Twins =

Information
- League: Intercounty Baseball League
- Location: Mississauga, Ontario
- Ballpark: Meadowvale Field
- Founded: 2009
- Disbanded: 2011 (moved)
- Former name: Mississauga Twins (2009–2011)
- Colours: White, blue
- General manager: Scott VandeValk
- Manager: Scott VandeValk
- Website: www.mississaugatwins.ca

The Mississauga Twins were an independent, minor league baseball team of the semi-pro, Intercounty Baseball League based in Mississauga, Ontario. They played their home games at Meadowvale Field. They moved to Burlington, Ontario, in 2011 and became the Burlington Twins.
