= Oshawa Dodgers =

Information
- League: Intercounty Baseball League (2002–09)
- Location: Oshawa, Ontario
- Ballpark: Kinsmen Memorial Stadium
- Founded: 2002
- Folded: 2009
- Former name: Oshawa Dodgers (2002–09)
- Colours: Black, white, red
- Ownership: Lori May Vice President Kerri Drake
- General manager: Dan Bleiwas
- Manager: Dan Bleiwas
- Website: www.oshawadodgers.net

The Oshawa Dodgers were an independent, minor league baseball team of the semi-pro Intercounty Baseball League based in Oshawa, Ontario. They played their home games at Kinsmen Stadium.

The team was founded by local amateur baseball coach Troy May and began play in the 2002 season. In addition to owning the Dodgers, May managed the club for their first four seasons before passing over the managerial duties to Mike Prosper in 2006.

Troy May died during the final week of the 2006 season on July 19, four days after being involved in a serious automobile accident.

Following the 2009 season, the Dodgers announced that they would be suspending all baseball operations indefinitely. The lack of fan support and high cost of operating the team were ownership's primary concerns.
