= Hastings Stadium =

Baseball park in Guelph, Ontario

Coordinates: 43.5518°N 80.2656°W

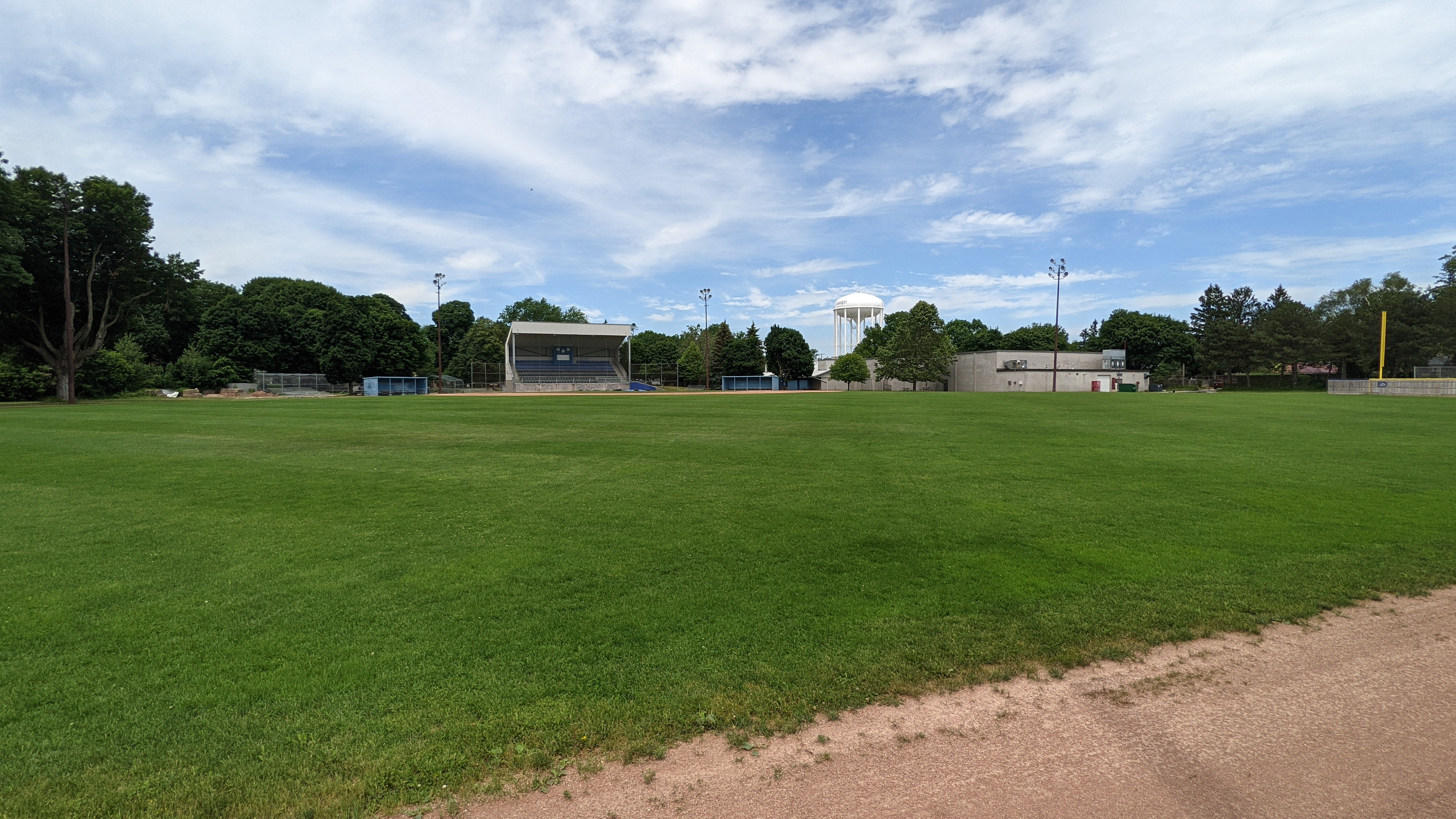
- Interactive map of Hastings Stadium
- Former names: Exhibition Park
- Location: Guelph, Ontario, Canada
- Owner: City of Guelph
- Capacity: 2,500
- Surface: Grass

Construction
- Opened: 1925
- Renovated: 1987 and 2013 and 2017

Tenants
- Guelph Royals; University of Guelph Gryphons Guelph Silvercreeks

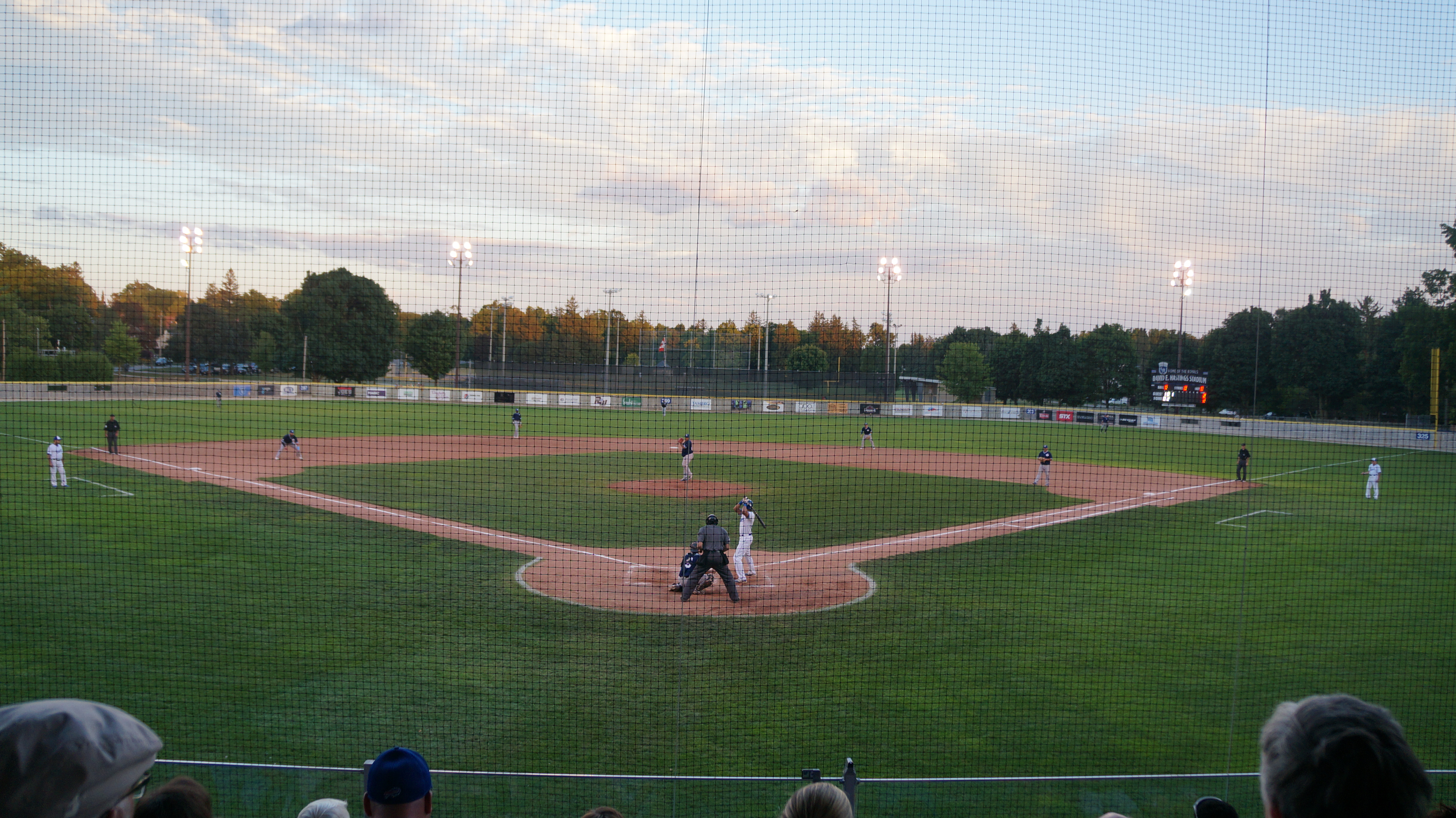

Hastings Stadium, officially the David E. Hastings Stadium, is a baseball park located in the Exhibition Park area of Guelph, Ontario. It is home to the Guelph Royals of the Canadian Baseball League and the home of the Guelph Silvercreeks. It is named after a local baseball player who was active from 1943 to 1968, first in Minor Baseball and then in the Senior Intercounty league. He then went on to manage the Guelph Junior and Senior teams until 1973. He was also mayor of Guelph, 1958–1960.

The current grandstand was built in 1987 to replace the one built in 1924. The infield was renovated in the fall of 2013 by the City of Guelph Sportsfield Department, the field underwent renovations to the outfield fencing, bull pens, and foul poles, and replacement of the scoreboard and sound system in 2017.

== Stadium Dimensions ==
- Right Field - 325 ft
- Right Center Field - 393 ft
- Center Field - 369 ft
- Left Center Field - 403 ft
- Left Field - 325 ft
