= Barrie Community Sports Complex =

Multi-use sports facility in Minesing, Ontario, Canada

Coordinates: 44.4464°N 79.7662°W

- Interactive map of Barrie Community Sports Complex
- Address: 2100 Nursery Road
- Location: Minesing, Ontario, Canada
- Owner: City of Barrie
- Capacity: 1,500
- Surface: Grass

Construction
- Opened: 2000

Tenants
- Barrie Baycats; Barrie Minor Baseball Association; Huronia Stallions Football; Barrie Soccer Club; Adult Men's & Coed Slo pitch Leagues

Barrie Community Sports Complex is a multi use sports facility located in Minesing, Ontario, Canada. Athletic Kulture Stadium is the baseball park at the complex and is home to the Barrie Baycats of the Canadian Baseball League.
