= Stratford Nationals (baseball) =

Information
- League: Intercounty Baseball League
- Location: Stratford, Ontario
- Ballpark: National Stadium
- Founded: 1919
- League championships: 14 (5 Ontario Baseball Association titles): 1934; 1938; 1939; 1940; 1946; 1974; 1976; 1977; 1980; 1986; 1987; 1989; 1991; 1992
- Former name: St. Thomas Storm; Stratford Kraven Knits; Stratford Hillers; Stratford Nationals
- Colours: Red, white
- Ownership: John Gillespie; Shawn Gillespie
- General manager: Shawn Gillespie
- Manager: Mud Grasby
- Website: www.stratfordnationals.com

The Stratford Nationals were a semi-professional baseball team based in Stratford, Ontario, that competed in the Intercounty Baseball League, an independent baseball league.

== Early history ==
For many years, Stratford was a premier franchise in the Intercounty Baseball League and one of the league's founding members in 1919 (along with Galt, Guelph, and Kitchener). The team operated at various times as the Stratford Nationals, the Stratford Kraven Knits, and Stratford Hillers.

== Late history ==
The team was moved from St. Thomas, Ontario, to Stratford in 2004 after several years of dwindling fan support in St. Thomas. They played their home games at National Stadium.

Prior to its re-location, the team changed its name from the Storm to the Nationals for the 2006 season, in view of the Canadian National Railway's historical importance to Stratford. The Nationals struggled in their final seasons, missing the playoffs regularly.

On November 25, 2008, the team announced that the league had approved the sale of the Stratford Nationals to Elliott Kerr, president of the Landmark Sports Group, and the transfer of the franchise to the City of Mississauga, where it became the Mississauga Twins.

== Championships ==
Intercounty League

- 1934 (as the Nationals)
- 1938 (as the Nationals)
- 1939 (as the Nationals)
- 1940 (as the Nationals)
- 1946 (as the Nationals)
- 1974 (as the Kraven Knits)
- 1976 (as the Hillers)
- 1977 (as the Hillers)
- 1980 (as the Hillers)
- 1986 (as the Hillers)
- 1987 (as the Hillers)
- 1989 (as the Hillers)
- 1991 (as the Hillers)
- 1992 (as the Hillers)

The Stratford Nationals also won the Ontario Baseball Association title in 1930, 1931, 1932, 1933 and 1934.
