= Canadian Baseball League =

Canadian professional baseball league

- Upcoming season or competition: 2026 CBL season
- Formerly: Intercounty Baseball; League (1919–2025)
- Classification: Independent
- Sport: Baseball
- Founded: 1919
- Commissioner: Ted Kalnins
- No. of teams: 9
- Country: Canada
- Confederation: WBSC Americas
- Most recent champion: Welland Jackfish (3rd title)
- Most titles: Stratford Nationals (16)
- Broadcasters: YouTube; Cable 14 (Cardinals)
- Website: cbl.ca

The Canadian Baseball League (CBL) is a professional independent baseball league based in the Canadian province of Ontario. It is composed of nine teams, who annually play a home-and-away season from May to August. The top five teams at the end of the season qualify for a postseason tournament in September that determines the league's champion, who are awarded the Dominico Cup.

The league was founded in 1919 as the Intercounty Baseball League (IBL), and was a semi-professional league for the majority of its existence. It was fully-professionalized and rebranded to the CBL ahead of its 2026 season. More than 23 franchises have competed in the league in its 107-year history, with the Guelph Royals and Kitchener Panthers – both charter members – being the longest-tenured. As of its 2025 season, the Welland Jackfish are the current champions, while the Stratford Nationals, a defunct franchise, have won the most championships (16).

== History ==
The Intercounty Baseball League (IBL) was founded in 1919 with just four cities represented — Galt, Guelph, Stratford and Kitchener, and is the oldest amateur men's league in Canada. During the early years, the league expanded to include the cities of Waterloo, Brantford, Preston, London, and St. Thomas.

It was previously known as the Intercounty Major Baseball League and the Senior Intercounty Baseball League. Teams compete for the Jack and Lynne Dominico Trophy, which is awarded to the league champions. The trophy is named for the late owners of the Toronto Maple Leafs baseball team, husband and wife Jack and Lynne Dominico.

On December 3, 2024, the Toronto Maple Leafs announced they had signed Ayami Sato, making her the first female player in the league as well as the first female player chosen to play professional baseball in Canada. She began playing on May 11, 2025.

In 2025, IBL commissioner Ted Kalnins stated that league was transitioning from being a semi-professional to fully professional league and would be expanding to a total of 10 teams as a part of that effort. In addition to being a fully professional league, the league would now be known as the Canadian Baseball League and see the amount of regular season games played increase from 42 to 48, as well as a 5-team playoff structure. Further changes to the league are set to be announced in by the end of 2025.

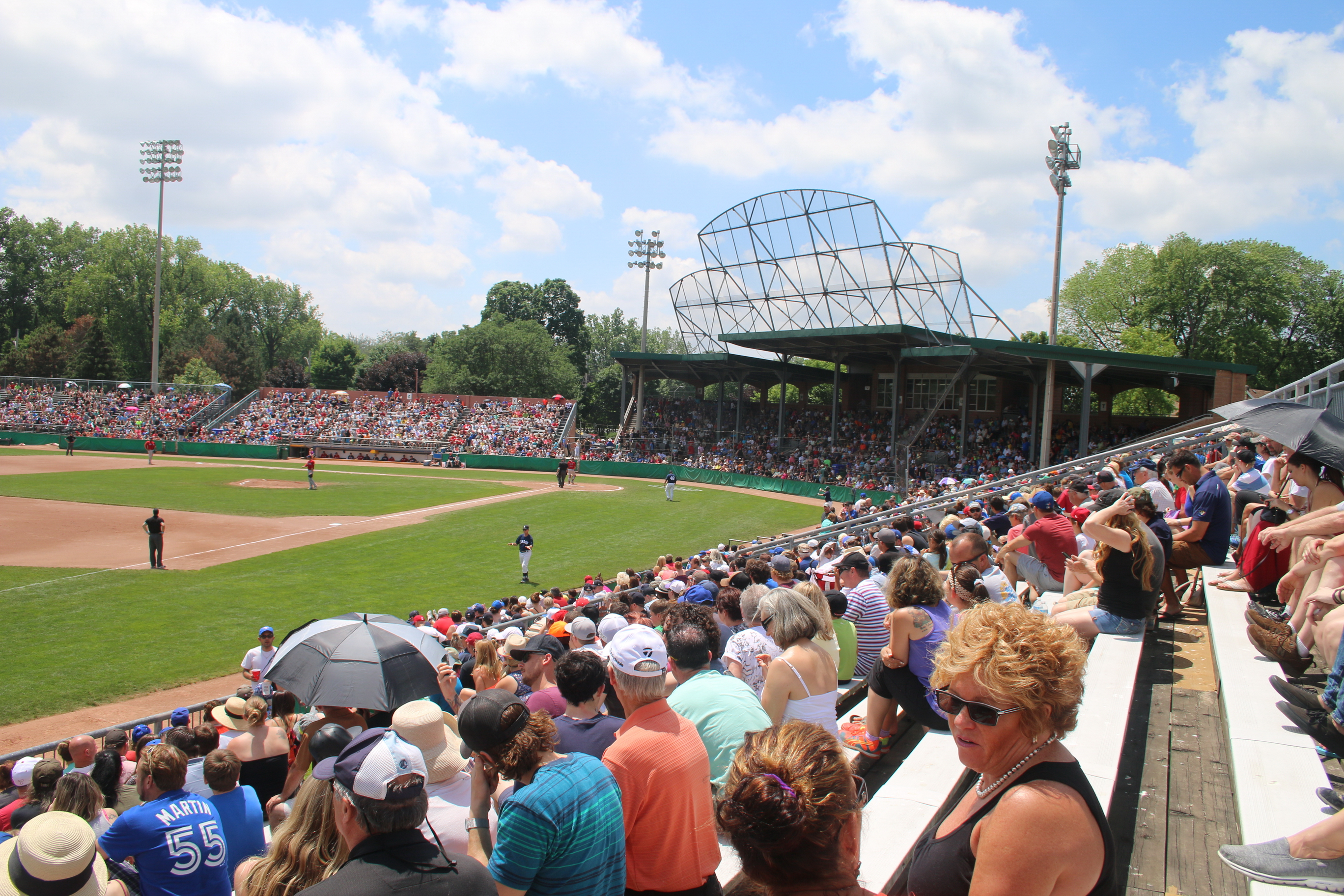
Labatt Park in London, Ontario, home of the London Majors.

=== All-Star Game ===
On July 8, 2006, in Barrie, the league's New Era IBL All-Star Classic game between the Barrie Baycats and the IBL All-Stars; Barrie won 7–2.

On August 21 and 22, 2010 in Ottawa, the Fat Cats hosted the New Era All-Star Classic between the IBL All-Stars and the All-Stars from Ligue de Baseball Senior Élite du Québec (LBSEQ).

Barrie hosted the league's All-Star Game on July 11, 2015, with the IBL All-Stars defeating Barrie Baycats 13–4.

Following a several-year hiatus the IBL announced they will be hosting a mid summer classic on July 20, 2024 in Welland.

All-Star Game results (2024 – present)

Year	Venue	Host team	Result	MVP	Home Run Derby winner
2024	Welland Stadium	Welland Jackfish	South 13 - North 6	Matteo Porcellato (Welland Jackfish)	Tyler Duncan (Hamilton Cardinals)
2025	Bernie Arbour Memorial Stadium	Hamilton Cardinals	North 5 - South 4	Yunior Ibarra (Kitchener Panthers)	Tyler Duncan (Hamilton Cardinals)
2026	Fergie Jenkins Field	Chatham-Kent Barnstormers	North 8- South 4	Canice Ejoh (Barrie Baycats)	Tyler Duncan (Hamilton Cardinals)

=== Transition to "Canadian Baseball League" ===
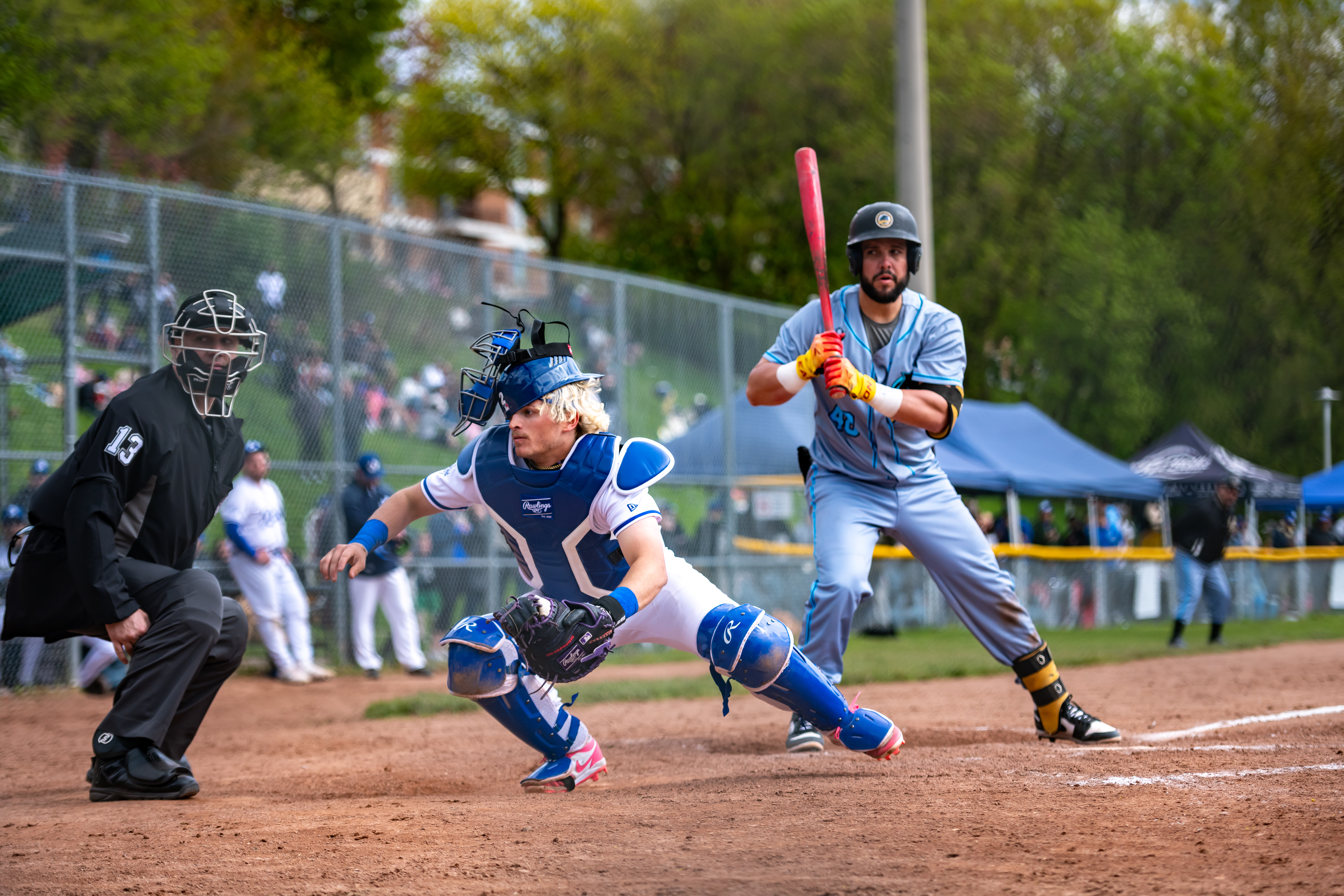
The Kitchener Panthers and Toronto Maple Leafs play during the 2026 season.

On November 24, 2025, the league announced that, beginning with the 2026 season, the league would be changing its name from the Intercounty Baseball League, which had been in use since the league's founding in 1919, to the Canadian Baseball League. The change was made due, in part, to the growing popularity of the league across the country, as well as the move from its former semi-professional standing to a fully professional structure. The league also announced that it would be expanding its regular season from 42 games to 48, and setting the number of playoff teams at five.

Under the new playoff system, the fourth- and -fifth place teams will play in a win-or-go-home one-game playoff, followed by the remaining teams playing in two best-of-seven series to determine the winner of the Dominico Cup.

== Teams ==
Locations of teams in Southern Ontario

As of its 2026 season, nine teams compete in the CBL, all based in Southern Ontario: the Barrie Baycats, Brantford Red Sox, Chatham-Kent Barnstormers, Guelph Royals, Hamilton Cardinals, Kitchener Panthers, London Majors, Toronto Maple Leafs, and Welland Jackfish. The Panthers and Royals, both charter members in the inaugural 1919 season, are the league's longest-tenured members. Expansion to 10 teams is planned for the 2027 season.

Each team is subject to a quota of eight foreign players, a maximum salary of CA$4,000, and a salary cap of CA$30,000; though no salary floor is enforced. While selection for a CBL squad makes a player ineligible to play in an NCAA team, they are still eligible to play in an OUA or OCAA team.

List of Canadian Baseball League teams
Team	Location	Stadium	Cap.	First
Barrie Baycats	Springwater	Athletic Kulture Stadium	1,500	2001
Brantford Red Sox	Brantford	Arnold Anderson Stadium	2,000	1921
Chatham-Kent Barnstormers	Chatham-Kent	Fergie Jenkins Field	1,600	2024
Guelph Royals	Guelph	Hastings Stadium	1,400	1919
Hamilton Cardinals	Hamilton	Bernie Arbour Memorial Stadium	3,000	1958
Kitchener Panthers	Kitchener	Jack Couch Park	1,400	1919
London Majors	London	Labatt Park	5,200	1925
Toronto Maple Leafs	Toronto	Dominico Field	1,000	1969
Welland Jackfish	Welland	Welland Stadium	3,241	2019

- **List of franchises (1919–present)**
- **Bold** text indicates current teams
- Galt Terriers / Cambridge Terriers (1919–1980s)
- Guelph Maple Leafs / Guelph-Waterloo Royals / Guelph Plymouths / Guelph Merchants / Guelph Royals / Guelph C-Joys / Guelph Forums / **Guelph Royals** (1919–present)
- Stratford Nationals / Stratford Kraven Knits / Stratford Hillers (1919–1990s)
- Kitchener McBrines / Twin City Panthers / Kitchener Panthers / Kitchener Wolves / Kitchener Bluetops / Kitchener Legionnaires / Kitchener-Waterloo Dutchmen / Kitchener-Waterloo Panthers / **Kitchener Panthers** (1919–present)
- Preston Riversides (1920s)
- **Brantford Red Sox** (1921–present)
- London Braves / London Winery / London Silverwoods / London Seniors / London Army Team / London Majors / London Diamonds / London Majors / London Pontiacs / London Avcos / London El-Morocco Majors / **London Majors** (1925–present)
- Strathroy Royals (1930s)
- Waterloo Tigers (1940s–1980s)
- St. Thomas Legion / St. Thomas Elgins (1948–1961; 1963–1996)
- Oshawa Merchants / Oshawa Motors (1950s)
- Oakville Oaks (1956–1958)
- Listowel Legionnaires (1957–1969)
- Hamilton Cardinals / Hamilton Thunderbirds / Hamilton Beavers / Hamilton Red Wings / **Hamilton Cardinals** (1958–present)
- Windsor Chiefs (1979–1981)
- **Toronto Maple Leafs** (1969–present)
- Niagara Falls Mariners (1985–1989)
- St. Thomas Storm / Stratford Nationals / Mississauga Twins / Burlington Twins / Burlington Bandits / Burlington Herd / **Welland Jackfish** (2000–present)
- Waterloo Tigers (2000–2003)
- **Barrie Baycats** (2001–present)
- Oshawa Dodgers (2002–2009)
- Ottawa Fat Cats (2010–2012)
- **Chatham-Kent Barnstormers** (2024–present)

== Awards ==
The postseason championship team is awarded the Jack and Lynne Dominico Cup.

Other awards presented include:

- John Coppes Trophy – Awarded to the team with the best record in the regular season.
- Max Roseman Memorial Trophy – Awarded to the player deemed the Most Valuable Player of the postseason.
- John Bell Memorial Trophy (formerly the Rawlings IBL Player of the Year Award) – Awarded to the player deemed the Most Valuable Player of the regular season.
- Brian Kerr Memorial Trophy (formerly the IBL Rookie of the Year Award) – Awarded to the most proficient first year CBL player.
- Reid Buck Memorial Trophy – Awarded to the hitter with the regular season's best batting average.
- Ted Earley Memorial Trophy – Awarded to the pitcher with the regular season's lowest Earned Run Average.
- Troy May Memorial Trophy – Awarded to the best manager of the regular season.

== Notable players ==
- John Axford (Brantford Red Sox) – Milwaukee Brewers, St. Louis Cardinals, Cleveland Indians, Pittsburgh Pirates, Colorado Rockies, Oakland Athletics, Los Angeles Dodgers, Toronto Blue Jays
- Don Beaupre (Waterloo Tigers) – Minnesota North Stars
- Todd Betts (Barrie Baycats) – Yakult Swallows
- Tom Burgess
- Rich Butler (Toronto Maple Leafs) – Toronto Blue Jays, Tampa Bay Devil Rays
- Rob Butler (Toronto Maple Leafs) – Toronto Blue Jays, Philadelphia Phillies
- Frank Colman† (London Majors) – Pittsburgh Pirates, New York Yankees
- Scott Diamond (Guelph Royals) – Minnesota Twins, Toronto Blue Jays
- Rob Ducey† (Cambridge) – Philadelphia Phillies, Toronto Blue Jays, California Angels, Texas Rangers, Nippon-Ham Fighters, Seattle Mariners, Philadelphia Phillies, Montreal Expos
- Wilmer Fields (Brantford Red Sox) 1939–50 – Homestead Grays
- Mike Gardiner (Stratford Hillers) – Detroit Tigers, Boston Red Sox, Montreal Expos, Seattle Mariners 1990–1995
- Ferguson Jenkins† (London Majors) – Philadelphia Phillies, Chicago Cubs, Texas Rangers, Boston Red Sox (1991 National Baseball Hall of Fame inductee)
- Mike Kilkenny (London Majors) – Detroit Tigers
- Joe Krakauskas (Brantford Red Sox) 1937–46 – Washington Senators & Cleveland Indians
- Larry Landreth (Stratford Hillers) – Montreal Expos
- Lester Lockett (Kitchener) – Baltimore Elite Giants
- Roy McKay (London Majors) – Detroit Tigers
- Denny McLain (London Majors) – Detroit Tigers, Washington Senators, Oakland Athletics, Atlanta Braves
- Jesse Orosco (Galt Terriers) – New York Mets, Los Angeles Dodgers, Cleveland Indians, Milwaukee Brewers, Baltimore Orioles, St. Louis Cardinals, San Diego Padres, New York Yankees, Minnesota Twins
- Pete Orr (Toronto Maple Leafs) – Atlanta Braves, Washington Nationals, Philadelphia Phillies
- Lester B. Pearson† (Guelph Maple Leafs) – Prime Minister of Canada (22 April 1963 – 20 April 1968)
- Dalton Pompey (Guelph Royals) – Toronto Blue Jays
- Yasiel Puig (Toronto Maple Leafs) - Los Angeles Dodgers. Cincinnati Reds, Cleveland Indians
- Fernando Rodney (Hamilton Cardinals) — Detroit Tigers, Los Angeles Angels, Tampa Bay Rays, Seattle Mariners, Chicago Cubs, San Diego Padres, Miami Marlins, Oakland Athletics, Washington Nationals
- Goody Rosen† (Galt Terriers) – Brooklyn Dodgers, New York Giants
- Dave Rozema (London Majors) – Detroit Tigers
- Chris Speier (Stratford) – San Francisco Giants, St. Louis Cardinals, Minnesota Twins, Chicago Cubs & Montreal Expos
- Paul Spoljaric (Toronto Maple Leafs, Barrie Baycats) – Toronto Blue Jays, Seattle Mariners, Philadelphia Phillies, Kansas City Royals
- Ron Stead† (Brantford Red Sox) – 1967 Pan American Games
- Fred Thomas† (Kitchener Panthers) – Wilkes-Barre Barons, Cincinnati Crescents (basketball), Toronto Argonauts (CFL)
- Rob Thomson† (Stratford Hillers) – Detroit Tigers
- Scott Thorman (Brantford Red Sox) – Atlanta Braves
- Jimmy Wilkes (Brantford Red Sox) – Newark Eagles, Houston Eagles, Indianapolis Clowns

† Player is an inductee of the Canadian Baseball Hall of Fame

== Notable executives ==
- Bob Ferguson, league statistician (1958 to 1966) and owner of the London Pontiacs (1963 to 1964)
