= Guelph Royals (baseball) =

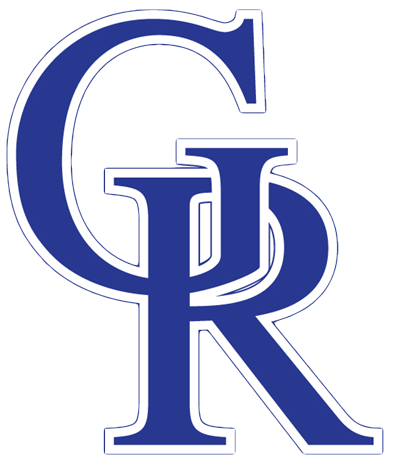
- Logo

Information
- League: Canadian Baseball League (1919–present)
- Location: Guelph, Ontario
- Ballpark: David E. Hastings Stadium
- Founded: 1861
- Nickname: The Royals
- League championships: 9: 1919; 1920; 1921; 1932; 1970; 1993; 1997; 2003; 2004
- Former name: Guelph Royals; Guelph CJOYs; Guelph Royals (1962–63); Guelph Merchants (1958–61); Guelph Plymouths (1957); Guelph-Waterloo Royals (1954–56); Guelph Maple Leafs (1861–1953)
- Former leagues: Intercounty League (1911–18); Canadian League (1896–1911); International Association for Professional Base Ball Players (1877); Canadian Association of Base Ball (1876)
- Colours: Royal blue, white
- Ownership: Shawn Fuller
- Manager: Dino Roumel
- Website: www.guelphroyals.com

Current uniforms
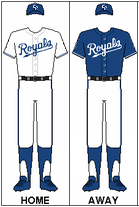

The Guelph Royals are a baseball team based in the downtown area of Guelph, Ontario, and are a member of the Canadian Baseball League

The club was founded in 1861 as the Guelph Maple Leafs, and after winning the "Canadian Silver Ball Championship" three times between 1869 and 1872, went on to become world semi-professional champions in 1874, and hold brief membership in the International Association for Professional Base Ball Players during the 1877 season, rivalling National League teams.

In 1919, they joined the Intercounty Baseball League, and underwent a series of name changes (the Guelph-Waterloo Royals in 1954; the Guelph Plymouths in 1957; the Guelph Merchants in 1958; the Guelph Royals in 1962; the Guelph CJOYs in 1964) before being officially renamed the "Royals". From 1861 to 1925, the team divided its home games between various ballparks in the city, before the construction of a stadium in Exhibition Park led them to permanently play there.

In 1986, they moved into a new stadium, David E. Hastings Stadium, also in Exhibition Park. In spite of only winning one Intercounty championship between 1932 and 1993, the team has done well in some subsequent years. However, a May 2018 news item stated that "the Royals haven’t been above .500 since 2012 and haven't won a league title since 2004". The team folded in 2017 but was re-started under new owners in 2018.

== History ==
=== A. S. Feast, George Sleeman, and the Guelph Maple Leafs (1861–1873) ===
In 1861, baseball enthusiast A. S. Feast moved from Hamilton, Ontario to Guelph, and – being a professed fan of the Hamilton Maple Leafs, whose name was derived from the nascent national symbol – founded a new, semi-professional club, the "Guelph Maple Leafs", in order to take advantage of the high popularity of the sport in 19th-century Southwestern Ontario. The Maple Leafs began play the summer of that year, and their first game wound up a 27-27 tie against a club from Flamborough, Ontario, as the umpires were unsure whether it would be permissible to continue the game beyond nine innings.

Under the guidance of Feast, and helped by the substantial amount of talent in the region, the Maple Leafs soon became one of the most promising baseball clubs in Canada, and, in 1865, nearly defeated the Woodstock Young Canadians to win the "Canadian Silver Ball Championship" – a loosely-knit tournament in which Canadian teams of the time participated – losing 36-29 in a tumultuous final wherein Guelph players endured threats of physical violence from the audience. During this time, Maple Leafs games frequently attracted attendance in the thousands, owing partly to a high-profile rivalry with the London Tecumsehs, which had caused a schism in the Southwestern Ontario baseball community.

By 1869, the Maple Leafs succeeded in winning the Canadian Silver Ball Championship, and proceeded to do so repeatedly until 1871, when they were granted permanent possession of the coveted Silver Ball Trophy. Their status as Canadian champions quickly attracted the attention of George Sleeman, local owner of Silver Creek Brewery, who purchased the team then merged it with one he already owned, the Silver Creek Baseball Club, and began funding the aggressive acquisition of American players, including Pete Gillespie, Scott Hastings, and a new pitcher, William Smith. The Maple Leafs' high-profile acquisitions represented a first for Canadian baseball, and other clubs in the region soon followed suit.

The Maple Leafs' prestige increased significantly due to victories accumulated by their strengthened roster, and on July 1, 1873, the Boston Red Stockings, defending National Association champions, played an exhibition game in Guelph in front of an audience of over 10,000 and won 27-8. The match is fictionalized by legendary Western writer Zane Grey – whose brother, Reddy Grey, played for the Boston Red Stockings at the time they competed against the Maple Leafs – in his short story published in 1920, "The Winning Ball", in which Guelph defeats a professional team from Rochester in spite of the opposing team's use of the "rabbit", a baseball made when a friend of the manager's "removed the covers from a number of league balls and sewed them on rubber balls of his own making".

=== World semi-professional champions, on hiatus (1874–1895) ===
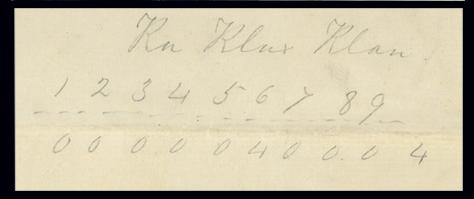
A scorecard from a baseball game held between the Guelph Maple Leafs and the Oneida Ku Klux Klan.

In 1874, George Sleeman received word of a world semi-professional championship being hosted in Watertown, New York, and – thinking the Maple Leafs had a shot – began readying the team. His hopes were validated later that year when a virtuoso performance by pitcher William Smith led the Maple Leafs to three straight victories over some of the best clubs in North America, including a 13-4 trouncing of a Ku Klux Klan team from Oneida, New York. Guelph's victory in this tournament bolstered their international reputation considerably, and may represent the zenith of the franchise's success.

The mid-late 1870s brought with them new challenges for the Maple Leafs. In 1875, London, England-born entrepreneur and oil refiner Jacob L. Englehart purchased the London Tecumsehs, and their subsequent acquisition of star pitcher and future Chicago White Stocking Fred Goldsmith, along with catcher Phil Powers and fielder Joe Hornung, challenged Guelph's status as the foremost Canadian baseball club. On May 24, 1876, in front of 6,000 fans in London, the London Tecumsehs finally succeeded in defeating the Maple Leafs 8-7 in ten innings for the Canadian championship, largely owing to Fred Goldsmith's "scientific pitching", which made use of his innovative "skew ball". Later that year, both teams became charter entrants in the Canadian Association of Base Ball, which was co-organized by George Sleeman, and played for only a few months before closing.

The Maple Leafs' exit from the Canadian Association of Base Ball left them without a formal league to play in, and this, coupled with the necessity of holding membership in one in order to field a competitive professional or semi-professional team in the post-National Association of Professional Base Ball Players era caused them to begin searching aggressively. During this period, in late 1876, the St. Louis Brown Stockings – a successful team in the upstart National League, and the antecedents of the modern-day St. Louis Cardinals – travelled to Guelph to play an exhibition match, and were defeated resoundingly.

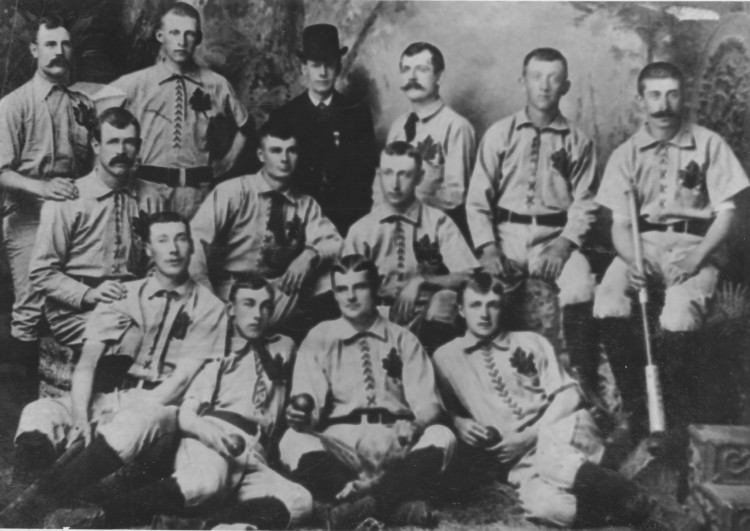
The Guelph Maple Leafs in the late nineteenth century. George Sleeman is pictured behind.

The club's lack of a competitive league to play in was resolved in 1877, when they, along with the London Tecumsehs, both joined the semi-professional International Association for Professional Base Ball Players, which featured both American and Canadian teams, and positioned itself as a rival to the increasingly dominant National League. The Maple Leafs' first season of play, however, was less than successful, as they went 4-12, second lowest in the league only to the subsequently disbanded Lynn Live Oaks, and at cessation withdrew from it. The London Tecumsehs played on for the following season, but closed their doors at its conclusion in 1878, citing a shortage of funds.

In the 1880s, the Maple Leafs continued to play at a high level locally, but increased player salaries, coupled with the club's lack of a strong league affiliation, meant baseball in Guelph had begun to flounder. Worsening matters was the team's releasing of key prospect Bud Fowler – a marquee pitcher, and the first ever African-American to play professionally – to the Petrolia Imperials, due to racial discomfort, as well as George Sleeman's lessened involvement in the club's affairs due to the relinquishing of his business assets to his son. In 1886, a promising Maple Leafs team – featuring the likes of Lou Bierbauer, George Bradley, Mike Jones and Ed Kent – lost money, and was placed on hiatus.

=== Into the Intercounty League, out of limbo (1896–1932) ===
After an extended lull, the Maple Leafs regained their footing in 1896, when a new-look team featuring third baseman Jim Cockman and right fielder Bunk Congalton finished the season in a reorganized Canadian League with a .667 record. The following three seasons were less successful, as the Maple Leafs consistently ranked between .400 and .500, however, they did manage to acquire several excellent players, including Babe Doty and Joe Kostal.

Baseball had its ups and downs until 1919 – the Maple Leafs defeated the St. Louis Browns in an exhibition match in 1876 and in 1894, under a new board of officers, won the semi-pro championship of Canada – when the Inter-County League was established.

Guelph beat Galt for the Inter-County title the first three years of the new league then had the roles reversed the next three. All told, Royal City teams won four league titles and were runners-up six times before the Second World War.

In 1932, the Guelph Maple Leafs won the Ontario Baseball Association senior title. It was the only time in Guelph history that happened.

Professional baseball came to Guelph in 1911, when a Canadian league was formed by George 'Knotty' Lee. Guelph teams played a total of four seasons.

In 1930 Lee brought pro ball back to Guelph with the Biltmores, who played in the Class D Ontario League along with teams from London, St. Thomas, Brantford, Hamilton and St. Catharines. Jim O'Connor, who was the Inter-County batting champion in 1928, was the only local player to make the Biltmores.

In July of that year, just two months after the league began, it folded. St. Catharines, the top team in the league, started the trend on July 21 and the rest of the teams followed suit the next day.

=== Modern history (1933–present) ===
For the next 30 years, Guelph's Inter-County team went through an extended dry spell. The Guelph Royals won the regular-season pennant in 1962 but the Brantford Red Sox went on to take the playoff title.

In 1964 the team took the name the Guelph C-Joys, after local AM radio station CJOY. They would later revert to the Guelph Royals. The Guelph C-Joys won back-to-back pennants starting in 1966 but didn't break through to win in the playoffs until 1970.

That was the last playoff victory for the local franchise until the Guelph Royals won the 1993 championship.

The Royals also won the 1997 Inter-County title and lost in the league final on two other occasions, including an infamous ninth-inning collapse that gave the Stratford Hillers the 1994 crown.

A number of Guelph players have gone on to the pro ranks during the city's history.

As of 2015, three Guelphites were playing professionally. Jeremy Ware spent seven seasons in the Montreal Expos organization before moving to the Cleveland Indians earlier this year while Shawn Pearson (Toronto Blue Jays) and Jamie Pogue (St. Louis Cardinals) are also playing in the minor leagues. Notable players are Mark Shepherd. Shepherd who was a promising left handed power hitter from Oakville. Other notable achievements. Chris Robinson, catcher for Morehead State University, who played two seasons with the Royals, was named to the NCAA DI, First Team All American team in 2015.

=== Folding and re-starting (2017) ===
In the 2017 season, Guelph went an abysmal 1-15 after 16 games and they pulled out for the rest of the season The club subsequently folded but was re-started under a new owner, Shawn Fuller and Guelph mayor Cam Guthrie in September 2017. Former owner Jim Rooney was unable to attend the press conference. Fuller said that he would give up the non-profit status and run the team as a corporation.

The Royals fielded a new team for the 2018 season, including five players imported from the Dominican Republic, including Angel Villalona a former top San Francisco Giants prospect. The Royals were eliminated from the playoffs on 13 August 2018 when they lost to the Toronto Maple Leafs (semi-pro baseball) team. During the 2019 season and 2022 seasons, the team was eliminated from the playoffs after losing to the Hamilton Cardinals.

== See also ==
- List of baseball teams in Canada
- Lester B. Pearson – played one summer with the then Guelph Maple Leafs
