= Brantford Red Sox =

Logo
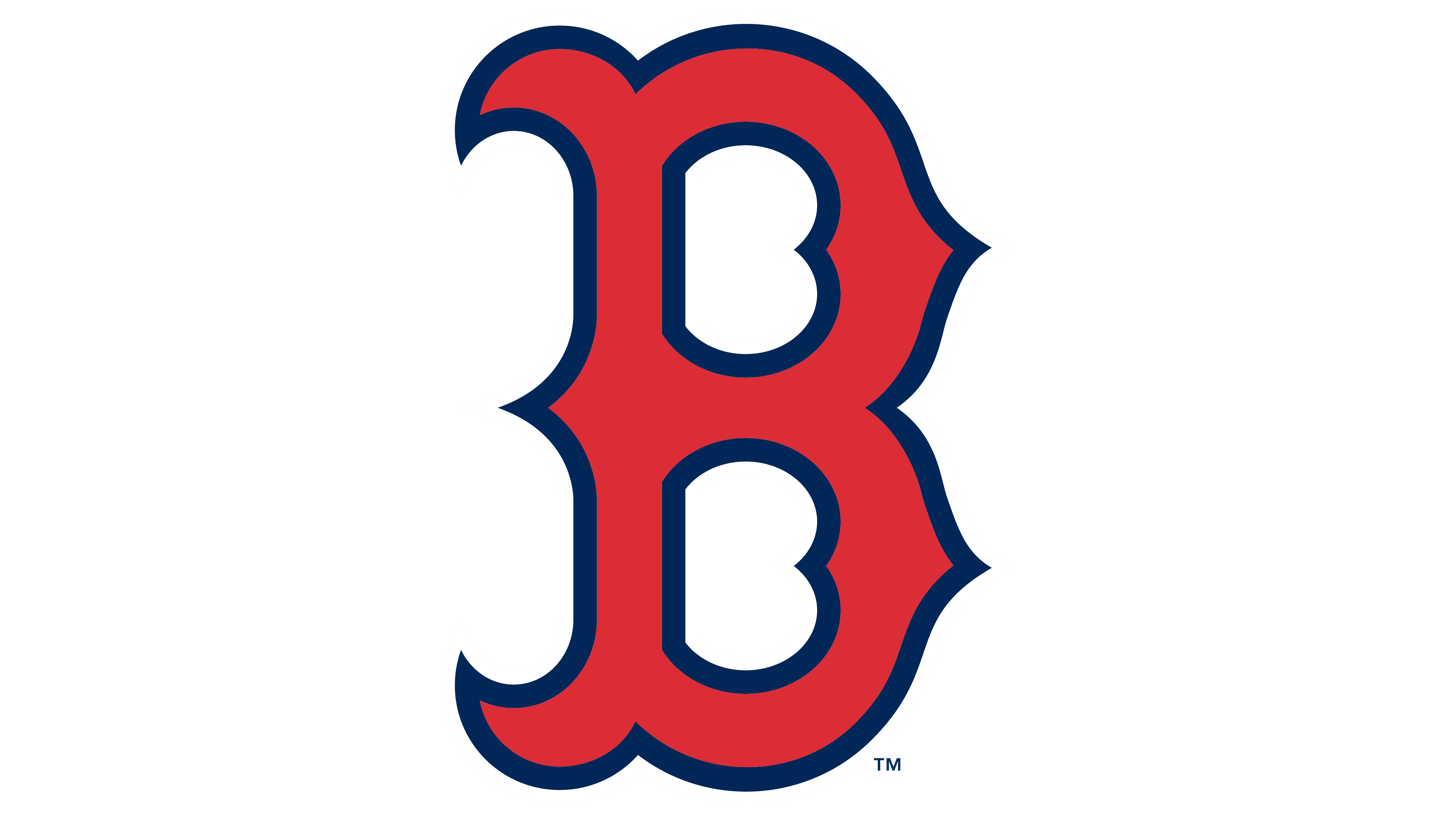
Cap insignia

Information
- League: Canadian Baseball League (1919–present)
- Location: Brantford, Ontario
- Ballpark: Arnold Anderson Stadium
- Founded: 1911
- League championships: 15: 1949; 1959; 1960; 1961; 1962; 1963; 1965; 1981; 2006; 2008; 2009; 2010; 2011; 2012; 2013
- Former league(s): Canadian League, Michigan-Ontario League, Ontario League
- Colours: Red, white, blue
- Ownership: Terry Smith
- Website: www.brantfordredsox.com

The Brantford Red Sox are an independent, minor league baseball team that play in the Canadian Baseball League based in Brantford, Ontario. They play their home games at Arnold Anderson Stadium.

== History ==
The Brantford Red Sox were founded in 1911 when they joined the Canadian Baseball League.

In 1915, the league folded due to World War I, and after a short hiatus the team played in the Michigan-Ontario League from 1919 to 1922. After another break they joined the Ontario League in 1930, which folded due to the Great Depression. Brantford first joined the Intercounty Baseball League in 1921 but not under the name "Red Sox"(that name was in use by the Brantford team in the Michigan-Ontario League). It was in 1946 when Brantford first had a team named the Red Sox in the I-C (intermediate division).

== Championships ==
In 1921, they joined the Intercounty Baseball League. They won the championship 15 times.

- 1949
- 1959
- 1960
- 1961
- 1962
- 1963
- 1965
- 1981
- 2006
- 2008
- 2009
- 2010
- 2011
- 2012
- 2013

The Brantford Red Sox's six consecutive championships from 2008 to 2013 set an Intercounty Baseball League record

Won the Pennant 11 times.

- 1950
- 1951
- 1960
- 1961
- 1962
- 1963
- 1965
- 1981
- 2010
- 2012
- 2013

== Roster ==
Brantford Red Sox roster
Active roster	Coaching staff
Pitchers: 34 (Dominican Republic) Jose Arias; 6 (Canada) Aidan Armitage; 24 (Canada) Haldon Craig; 37 (Dominican Republic) Jorge De La Cruz; 20 (Canada) Connor Irvine; 16 (Canada) Colbey Klepper; 10 (Canada) Kade Kozak; 28 (Canada) Noah Law; -- (Dominican Republic) Leandro Mejia; 19 (Canada) Anthony Porcellato; 27 (Dominican Republic) Jordis Ramos; 11 (Canada) Greg Rapp; -- (Dominican Republic) Axel Rosario; -- (Canada) Graham Tebbit; Utility players: -- (United States) Christian Kuzemka; Catchers: 17 (Canada) Andrew Savage; 36 (Canada) Brandon Sekulovich; 15 (Canada) Cassidy Watt; Infielders: 33 (Canada) Lucas Bateman; 9 (United States) Jakob Cantor; 7 (Canada) Tim Holyk; 5 (Canada) AJ Karosas; 8 (Canada) Lucas Lefebvre; 21 (United States) Christian Ortega; -- (Canada) Charlie Towers; Outfielders: 4 (Canada) Brody Black; -- (United States) Walker Hultgren; 32 (United States) Nick Iannantone; -- (Cuba) Francisco Martinez ‡; 13 (Canada) Ethan Paulos	Manager: -- Terry Smith (general manager); -- Ty Smith (assistant general manager); Coaches; Roster updated on July 3, 2026: Disabled list; ‡ Inactive list; § Suspended list

== Hall of Famers ==
London, Ontario-born left-handed pitcher, Ron Stead, for example, led Brantford to five league titles (1960-1963, 1965) and was inducted into the Canadian Baseball Hall of Fame on June 24, 2006, in St. Marys, Ontario. Stead also won an Intercounty title with the Guelph C-Joys in 1970.

A legend of the Intercounty loop, Stead is first in all-time wins (104), strikeouts (1,231), shutouts (25), most appearances (198), most innings pitched (1,365) and complete games (116). Stead was a 10-time All-Star and four-time MVP (1960, 1963, 1965 and 1967). He was also the starting pitcher for Team Canada at the 1967 Pan American Games in Winnipeg, Manitoba, Canada.

== 2006 Red Sox win the Jack and Lynne Dominico Trophy ==
On August 25, 2006, the Brantford Red Sox won the Intercounty title for the first time since 1981 by defeating the London Majors 7-3 in Brantford before 2,000 fans at Arnold Anderson Stadium in Cockshutt Park.

Brantford, which finished third in the standings during regular season play, came on strong during the second half of the regular season and the playoffs. In the championship series, the Red Sox defeated the London Majors four games to one.

The 2006 IBL championship team includes: Jason Gotwalt, Lee Delfino, Adam Clarke, Al Stephens, Dave Parsons, Hyung Cho, Ryan Brickman, Chris Baker, Adam Vella, Wayne Forman, Raul Borjas, Brad Hogeterp, Mike Anderson, Mark Ferguson, Josh McCurdy, Steve Murray, Tyler Moe, Stefan Strecker, John Ogiltree, Aaron Boag, Tyler Burnell, Adrian Kerr, John Axford, John Mariotti, Min Soo Kim and manager/ vice-president of baseball operations Rick Johnston.

== Ownership history ==
- Max Roseman (1971-1974)
- Jerry Roseman (1977-78)
- Jay Johnson and Perry Davidson (1979-1984)
- Walter Gretzky, Romeo Shannelly, and John Mount (1985-1991)
- Mike Calbeck (1992-2001)
- Paul Aucoin (2002 -2014)
- Jeff Hamilton and Lee Delfino (2015-2016)
- Rick and Connie Pomerleau (2017 to 2025)
  - On January 9, 2025 it was announced that the team was being put up for sale.
- Terry Smith (2025 to present)
