= Hamilton Cardinals =

Canadian professional baseball team

- Logo

Information
- League: Canadian Baseball League
- Location: Hamilton, Ontario
- Ballpark: Bernie Arbour Memorial Stadium
- Founded: 1958
- League championships: 1: 1978
- Former name: Hamilton Cardinals (2012–present) (1975–2004) (1960–1961); Hamilton Thunderbirds (2005–2011); Hamilton Real McCoys (1973–1974); Hamilton Marlins (1970–1972); Hamilton Red Wings (1966–1969); Hamilton Beavers (1958–1959)
- Colours: Red, black
- Ownership: Eric Spearin, Carmens Group and Dennis Concordia
- General manager: N/A
- Manager: Luis Bernardo
- Website: www.hamiltoncardinals.com

The Hamilton Cardinals are a Canadian professional baseball team based in Hamilton, Ontario and a member club of the Canadian Baseball League. Founded in 1958, the club is the second oldest sports team in the city of Hamilton. Many of the team's players are former major leaguers and minor professionals. Home games are played at Bernie Arbour Memorial Stadium.

The team has gone through several name changes over the years, most recently returning to the Cardinals name, after eight seasons as the Hamilton Thunderbirds. They were named the Thunderbirds when Drew Brady purchased the franchise on January 1, 2005, and the club adopted a new look with revitalized facilities and new uniforms. The Hamilton Cardinals played 1,490 games with a record of 525 wins and 965 losses before becoming the Thunderbirds, and winning the Intercounty title in 1978.

At a press conference on February 1, 2012, the club announced it would again be named the Hamilton Cardinals, because of the club's relationship with the Hamilton Cardinals youth rep program. In late 2013, Gary Molinaro purchased the team and appointed his son JP Molinaro the new team president while also hiring Mike Fortuna as the new general manager.

The team has gone through ownership changes in recent years, first in 2018 when a community ownership group led by Carmens Group was formed, then again in September 2022 when the ownership structure was changed to include local businessman Eric Spearin as the majority owner with PJ Mercanti of Carmens Group maintaining a minority position.

Shortly after the ownership change, the Hamilton Cardinals unveiled a new primary logo and uniforms for the 2023 season. The new logo features a strong modernized cardinal with a bat over its shoulder featuring a “hammer”-inspired bat weight. The logo emphasizes a new black and red colour scheme.

Under Spearin's leadership, the 2023 season heralded significant advancements for the organization, as evidenced by the Cardinals setting new benchmarks in attendance, television viewership, and merchandise sales. On May 21 2023, the Hamilton Cardinals retired #13 in honour of Dean Dicenzo. This was the first jersey number retired in franchise history. On the field, outfielder Tyler Duncan was awarded the franchise's first IBL Most Valuable Player and John Bell Memorial Trophy, boasting a .355 batting average, 6 doubles, 5 triples, a league-leading 16 home runs, and 51 RBIs over all 42 regular season games. Duncan's performance also established new franchise records in home runs and RBIs. Off the field, Spearin's contributions were recognized with the League's Executive of the Year award at the end of the 2023 season.

The conclusion of the 2023 season also marked another significant change for the organization, with long-time Manager Dean Castelli stepped down as Manager and Assistant Coach Chris Piano was named the Manager ahead of the 2024 season.

On November 28, 2024, the team made headlines across the baseball world when they announced that they had signed three-time MLB All-Star Fernando Rodney to a 1-year contract.

In spring 2025, the St. Louis Cardinals challenged the Hamilton Cardinals' application to the Canadian Intellectual Property Office for trademarks for their team name and logo.

== Roster ==
Hamilton Cardinals roster
Active roster		Coaching staff
Pitchers: 31 (Dominican Republic) Freisis Adames; 39 (Canada) Chris Boatto; 43 (Canada) Owen Boon; 32 (Canada) Casey Bouillere-Howard; 20 (Canada) Connor Cory; 23 (Canada) Jacob Gajic; -- (Canada) Danny Garcia; 71 (Canada) Steven Hospital; -- (Dominican Republic) Luis Ramirez; 4 (Canada) Caleb Seroski; 26 (Canada) Logan Warkentin; -- (Dominican Republic) Hector Yan; Utility players: -- (Dominican Republic) Darlin German; -- (Canada) Evan Magill	Catchers: -- (Canada) Jeremie Veilleux; Infielders: 6 (Canada) Jaden Brown; -- (Dominican Republic) Anderson Feliz; 32 (Canada) Brandon Nicoll; -- (Canada) Trevor Nicoll; 44 (Canada) Tanner Rempel; -- (Dominican Republic) Reyny Reyes; Outfielders: 30 (Dominican Republic) Carlos Dominguez; 5 (Canada) Tyler Duncan; -- (Dominican Republic) Angel Guerrero; 12 (Canada) Yolki Peña	Manager: Luis Bernardo; Coaches: Pedro Perez (assistant coach); Roster updated on May 26, 2026: Disabled list; ‡ Inactive list; § Suspended list

== Season-by-season records ==
Hamilton Beavers
Season	GP	Won	Lost	PCT	Field Manager
1958	32	7	25	.219	Dan Lewandowski
1959	28	14	14	.500	Don Cooper
Hamilton Cardinals
1960	34	19	15	.559	Bob Salvisburg
1961	34	19	15	.559	Nels Gilmour
Hamilton Red Wings
1966	29	10	19	.345	Joe Acciaroli
1967	28	11	17	.393	Dan Burgess / Howard Holt
1968	24	12	12	.500	Bill Rowe
1969	28	16	12	.571	Bill Rowe
Hamilton Marlins
1970	30	13	17	.433	Bill Rowe
1971	28	11	17	.393	Mike Buist
1972	28	10	18	.357	Mike Buist
Hamilton Real McCoys
1973	30	14	16	.467	Phil Beaudoin
1974	30	13	17	.433	Rick DeMarchi
Hamilton Cardinals
1975	28	11	17	.393	Rick DeMarchi
1976	32	7	25	.219	Rick DeMarchi / Phil Beaudoin
1977	32	15	17	.469	Phil Duffy
1978	36	19	17	.527	Phil Duffy
1979	30	9	21	.300	Phil Duffy
1980	34	14	18	.438	Gary Wilson
1981	34	14	20	.412	Greg Higson
1982	33	5	28	.152	Greg Higson
1983	34	12	22	.352	Vic Rosser
1984	31	6	25	.194	Phil Mavrinac / Gary Wilson
1985	36	12	24	.333	Phil Mavrinac
1986	32	7	25	.219	Gary Wilson
1987	34	10	24	.294	Vic Rosser
1988	34	11	23	.323	Tony O'Grady
1989	34	10	24	.294	Vic Rosser Jr.
1990	34	10	24	.294	Vic Rosser Jr. / Dean Dicenzo
1991	34	12	22	.353	John Foden
1992	32	7	25	.219	John Foden
1993	35	16	19	.457	Barry Hutton / Dennis Reynolds
1994	35	17	18	.486	Dennis Reynolds
1995	35	8	27	.229	Dennis Reynolds
1996	35	12	23	.343	Dennis Reynolds
1997	36	14	22	.389	Dean Dicenzo
1998	30	3	27	.100	Dean Dicenzo
1999	35	15	20	.429	Jeff Lounsbury
2000	35	16	19	.457	Jeff Lounsbury
2001	32	11	21	.344	Dennis Reynolds
2002	36	22	14	.611	Dean Castelli
2003	36	19	17	.528	Dean Castelli
2004	36	12	24	.333	S. Nichols / S. Ridley
Hamilton Thunderbirds
2005	34	16	18	.471	Dean Castelli / Montgomery
2006	36	14	22	.389	Montgomery
2007	36	16	20	.444	Jeff Lounsbury
2008	36	10	26	.278	Adeo Calcagni
2009	36	7	29	.194	Dennis Reynolds
2010	36	12	24	.333	John Turbitt
2011	35	7	28	.200	Matt Fortuna
Hamilton Cardinals
2012	36	6	30	.200	Matt Fortuna
2013	42	16	26	.381	Matt Fortuna
2014	36	11	25	.306	Matt Fortuna
2015	36	13	23	.361	Dean Castelli
2016	36	8	28	.222	Dean Castelli
2017	36	9	27	.250	Dean Castelli
2018	36	15	21	.417	Dean Castelli
2019	36	20	16	.556	Dean Castelli
2020	No season due to COVID-19				
2021	30	11	19	.367	Dean Castelli
2022	42	12	30	.286	Dean Castelli / Jeff Lounsbury
2023	42	19	23	.452	Dean Castelli
2024	42	18	24	.439	Chris Piano
2025	42	21	21	.500	Chris Piano/Luis Bernardo
