= List of stadiums in Canada =

The following is a list of sports stadiums in Canada.

== By capacity ==
Canada's largest stadiums, ranked in descending order of permanent seating capacity.

#	Stadium	City	Province	Capacity	Opened	Surface	Professional teams	Image
1	Commonwealth Stadium	Edmonton	Alberta	56,302	1978	Turf	Edmonton Elks (CFL)	
2	Olympic Stadium	Montreal	Quebec	56,040	1976	Turf	(Note: Occasionally hosts CF Montréal games.)	
3	BC Place	Vancouver	British Columbia	54,500	1983	Turf	BC Lions (CFL); Vancouver Whitecaps FC (MLS)	
4	Rogers Centre	Toronto	Ontario	39,150	1989	Turf	Toronto Blue Jays (MLB)	
5	McMahon Stadium	Calgary	Alberta	35,400	1960	Turf	Calgary Stampeders (CFL); Calgary Wild FC (NSL)	
6	Mosaic Stadium	Regina	Saskatchewan	33,350	2016	Turf	Saskatchewan Roughriders (CFL)	
7	Princess Auto Stadium	Winnipeg	Manitoba	33,134	2013	Turf	Winnipeg Blue Bombers (CFL); Valour FC (CPL)	
8	BMO Field	Toronto	Ontario	27,980	2007	Grass	Toronto Argonauts (CFL); Toronto FC (MLS)	
9	TD Place Stadium	Ottawa	Ontario	24,000	1908	Turf	Ottawa Redblacks (CFL); Atlético Ottawa (CPL); Ottawa Rapid FC (NSL)	
10	Hamilton Stadium	Hamilton	Ontario	23,218	2014	Turf	Hamilton Tiger-Cats (CFL); Forge FC (CPL)	
11	Percival Molson Memorial Stadium	Montreal	Quebec	23,025	1915	Turf	Montreal Alouettes (CFL)	
12	Stade Saputo	Montreal	Quebec	19,619	2008	Grass	CF Montréal (MLS)	
13	GMC Stadium	Calgary	Alberta	17,000	1974	Dirt	n/a	
14	Stade Telus-Université Laval	Quebec City	Quebec	12,817	1994	Turf	n/a	
15	Sobeys Stadium	Toronto	Ontario	12,500	2004	Hard surface	n/a	
16	IGA Stadium	Montreal	Quebec	11,815	1995	Hard surface	n/a	
17	Raymond Chabot Grant Thornton Park	Ottawa	Ontario	10,332	1993	Grass	Ottawa Titans (Frontier League)	

== By sport ==
=== Baseball ===
Stadium	Capacity	City	Province	Home team(s)
Olympic Stadium	45,757	Montreal	Quebec	
Rogers Centre	39,150	Toronto	Ontario	Toronto Blue Jays
Ottawa Stadium	10,332	Ottawa	Ontario	Ottawa Titans
RE/MAX Field	9,200	Edmonton	Alberta	Edmonton Riverhawks, Edmonton Collegiate Hawks
Blue Cross Park	7,461	Winnipeg	Manitoba	Winnipeg Goldeyes
Nat Bailey Stadium	6,500	Vancouver	British Columbia	Vancouver Canadians
Labatt Park	5,200	London	Ontario	London Majors, Fanshawe Falcons
Stade Canac	4,297	Quebec City	Quebec	Québec Capitales
Stade Quillorama	4,000	Trois-Rivières	Quebec	Trois-Rivières Aigles
Kiwanis Park	3,500	Moncton	New Brunswick	Moncton Fisher Cats
Welland Stadium	3,375	Welland	Ontario	Welland Jackfish
Port Arthur Stadium	3,031	Thunder Bay	Ontario	Thunder Bay Border Cats
Bernie Arbour Memorial Stadium	3,000	Hamilton	Ontario	Hamilton Cardinals
Royal Athletic Park	2,867	Victoria	British Columbia	Victoria HarbourCats, Victoria Golden Tide
Seaman Stadium	2,500 (Note: Seated capacity. Dawgs attendance is significantly higher due to berm seating.)	Okotoks	Alberta	Okotoks Dawgs
Hastings Stadium	2,500	Guelph	Ontario	Guelph Royals
Athletic Park	2,200	Medicine Hat	Alberta	Medicine Hat Mavericks
Spitz Stadium	2,200	Lethbridge	Alberta	Lethbridge Bulls
Andrews Field	2,000	Brandon	Manitoba	Wheat City Whiskey Jacks
Cairns Field	2,000	Saskatoon	Saskatchewan	Saskatoon Berries
Community Park	2,000	St. Catharines	Ontario	Brock Badgers
Currie Field	2,000	Regina	Saskatchewan	Regina Red Sox
Arnold Anderson Stadium at Cockshutt Park	2,000	Brantford	Ontario	Brantford Red Sox
Legacy Dodge Field	1,725	Fort McMurray	Alberta	Fort McMurray Giants
Barrie Metals Stadium	1,500	Barrie	Ontario	Barrie Baycats
NorBrock Stadium	1,500	Kamloops	British Columbia	Kamloops NorthPaws, TRU Wolfpack
Fergie Jenkins Field	1,443	Chatham-Kent	Ontario	Chatham-Kent Barnstormers
Jack Couch Stadium	1,400	Kitchener	Ontario	Kitchener Panthers
Elks Stadium	1,250	Kelowna	British Columbia	Kelowna Falcons, Okanagan College Coyotes
Amedée Roy Stadium	1,098	Sherbrooke	Quebec	Sherbrooke Expos
Dominico Field	1,000	Toronto	Ontario	Toronto Maple Leafs
St. Patrick's Park	1,000	St. John's	Newfoundland and Labrador	

=== Tennis ===
- Sobeys Stadium - Toronto
- IGA Stadium - Montreal
- National Tennis Centre (Canada) - Toronto

=== Rugby union ===
- BMO Field - Toronto, Ontario
- Centennial Stadium - Victoria, British Columbia
- Thunderbird Stadium - University Endowment Lands, British Columbia
- Commonwealth Stadium - Edmonton, Alberta
- Rotary Stadium - Abbotsford, British Columbia
- Swangard Stadium - Burnaby, British Columbia
- Swilers Rugby Park - St. John's, Newfoundland and Labrador
- Twin Elm Rugby Park - Ottawa, Ontario
- Fletcher's Fields - Markham, Ontario
- Keith Harris Stadium - Ottawa, Ontario
- University Stadium (Waterloo) - Waterloo, Ontario

== See also ==
- List of Canadian Football League stadiums
- List of indoor arenas in Canada
- List of North American stadiums by capacity
- Lists of stadiums
