= 2026 WCBL season =

Western Canadian Baseball League season

- League: Western Canadian Baseball League
- Sport: Baseball
- Duration: Regular season May 28–August 5 Postseason; August 7-August 17
- Games: 336
- Teams: 12
- Total attendance: 365,354
- League champions: Saskatoon Berries

WCBL seasons
- 2025 2027 →

The Energy City Cactus Rats planned to play their home games at the unfinished Energy City Metro Ballpark with no fans in attendance after playing as a road team in the 2025 season.

The League announced the second annual "Rural Roots Baseball Classic", on March 23, 2026. The match was to be hosted on May 29th, 2026 in Carnduff, Saskatchewan between the Weyburn Beavers and Saskatoon Berries. The game was hosted at Carnduff Ball Park and drew more than 600 fans.

The WCBL awarded Saskatoon to host the 2026 WCBL All-Star weekend, which took place July 18th & 19th.

== Regular season ==
West division
Rank	Team	GP	W	L	PCT	GB	DIFF
1	Okotoks Dawgs	56	42	14	.750	0.0	+229
2	Sylvan Lake Gulls	56	38	18	.679	4.0	+191
3	Lethbridge Bulls	56	33	23	.589	9.0	+28
4	Energy City Cactus Rats	56	21	33	.389	20.0	-84
5	Brooks Bombers	56	16	38	.296	25.0	-160
6	Fort McMurray Giants	56	15	41	.268	27.0	-169

East division
Rank	Team	GP	W	L	PCT	GB	DIFF
1	Moose Jaw Miller Express	56	41	15	.732	0.0	+149
2	Saskatoon Berries	56	38	18	.679	3.0	+187
3	Regina Red Sox	56	26	30	.464	15.0	-40
4	Medicine Hat Mavericks	56	22	34	.393	19.0	-37
5	Swift Current 57's	56	21	35	.375	20.0	-205
6	Weyburn Beavers	56	21	35	.375	20.0	-89

Source: "2026 Western Canadian Baseball League standings". wcblbaseball.com.

=== Attendance ===
As of August 15, 2026

Pos	Team	Total	High	Low	Average	Change
1	Okotoks Dawgs	134,826	6,474		4,815	n/a
2	Saskatoon Berries	49,223	2,360		1,758	n/a
3	Sylvan Lake Gulls	41,093	1,831		1,468	n/a
4	Medicine Hat Mavericks	35,300	2,470		1,307	n/a
5	Fort McMurray Giants	20,953	3,267		1,233	n/a
6	Lethbridge Bulls	25,082	2,105		929	n/a
7	Regina Red Sox	19,177	1,422		799	n/a
8	Energy City Cactus Rats	5,559	1,586		695	n/a
9	Moose Jaw Miller Express	12,016	853		429	n/a
10	Swift Current 57's	8,082	705		311	n/a
11	Brooks Bombers	6,974	922		258	n/a
12	Weyburn Beavers	5,538	505		264	n/a
	League total	365,354	6,474		1,260	n/a

== Post-season ==
2026 League championship
WCBL Postseason

Tournament details
- Dates: 7 August - 16 August
- Teams: 8
- Defending champions: Regina Red Sox
- TV partner: FloSports

Final positions
- Champions: Saskatoon Berries
- Runners-up: Sylvan Lake Gulls

Official website
- 2026 WCBL playoffs

At the end of the regular season, the top four teams from each division competed in the post-season for the league championship. The format consisted of three play-off rounds. In the first and second rounds, teams competed within their respective divisions. The winners in each round were determined by a best-of-3 series, with the winners advancing to the next round, and the losers being eliminated from competition.

Quarterfinals
W1	Okotoks Dawgs	2
W4	Energy City Cactus Rats	0
W2	Sylvan Lake Gulls	2
W3	Lethbridge Bulls	1
E1	Moose Jaw Miller Express	2
E4	Medicine Hat Mavericks	0
E2	Saskatoon Berries	2
E3	Regina Red Sox	1

Semifinals
W1	Okotoks Dawgs	0
W2	Sylvan Lake Gulls	2
E1	Moose Jaw Miller Express	0
E2	Saskatoon Berries	2

Finals
W2	Sylvan Lake Gulls	0
E2	Saskatoon Berries	2

Source: "2026 WCBL playoff results". wcblbaseball.com.
