= List of baseball teams in Canada =

The following is a list of current professional and collegiate summer baseball teams in Canada. It includes the leagues they play in and titles won.

== Professional ==
=== Major League Baseball ===
==== American League ====
Team	City	Established	Division titles	AL pennants	World Series titles	Notes
Toronto Blue Jays	Toronto, Ontario	1977	7	3	2	

=== Minor League Baseball ===
==== Northwest League ====
Team	City	Established	League titles	Notes
Vancouver Canadians	Vancouver, British Columbia	2000	5	Former Oakland Athletics affiliate (2000–2010); Current Toronto Blue Jays affiliate (2011–present)

=== Independent ===
==== American Association ====
Team	City	Established	League titles	Notes
Winnipeg Goldeyes	Winnipeg, Manitoba	1994	4	Moved from the Northern League on October 14, 2010; Won 1 Northern League Championship (1994); Won 3 American Association Championships (2012, 2016, 2017)

==== Canadian Baseball League ====
Team	City	Established	League titles	Notes
Barrie Baycats	Barrie, Ontario	2001	4	
Brantford Red Sox	Brantford, Ontario	1911	9	
Chatham-Kent Barnstormers	Chatham-Kent, Ontario	2024	0	
Guelph Royals	Guelph, Ontario	1919	8	
Hamilton Cardinals	Hamilton, Ontario	2005	1	Formerly as the Hamilton Beavers (1958–1962), Hamilton Cardinals (1960–2004) and Hamilton Thunderbirds (2005–2011)
Kitchener Panthers	Kitchener, Ontario	1919	12	
London Majors	London, Ontario	1925	9	
Toronto Maple Leafs	Toronto, Ontario	1968	7	
Welland Jackfish	Welland, Ontario	2019	1	Formerly as the Mississauga Twins (2009–2011), the Burlington Twins (2011–2012), the Burlington Bandits (2012–2016), and the Burlington Herd (2016–2018)

==== National Association of Professional Baseball ====
Team	City	Established	League titles	Notes
Ottawa Titans	Ottawa, Ontario	2020	1	
Québec Capitales	Quebec City, Quebec	1999	4	+9 titles win in Can-Am League
Trois-Rivières Aigles	Trois-Rivières, Quebec	2013	0	+1 title win in Can-Am League

== Collegiate ==
=== NAIA ===
Team	City	Established	League titles	Conference titles	Notes
UBC Thunderbirds	Vancouver, British Columbia	c. 1966	0	2	Associate member of the Cascade Collegiate Conference (CCC)

=== OUA (U Sports) ===
Team	City	Established	League titles	Notes
Brock Badgers	St. Catharines, Ontario		4	
Carleton Ravens	Ottawa, Ontario		0	
Guelph Gryphons	Guelph, Ontario		0	
Laurentian Voyageurs	Sudbury, Ontario		0	
McMaster Marauders	Hamilton, Ontario		1	
Ottawa Gee-Gees	Ottawa, Ontario		0	
Queen's Gaels	Kingston, Ontario		1	
Toronto Varsity Blues	Toronto, Ontario		8	
TMU Bold	Toronto, Ontario		0	
Waterloo Warriors	Waterloo, Ontario		0	
Western Mustangs	London, Ontario		6	
Wilfrid Laurier Golden Hawks	Waterloo, Ontario		3	
Windsor Lancers	Windsor, Ontario		0	
York Lions	York, Ontario		0	

=== RSEQ (CCAA) ===
Team	City	Established	League titles	Notes
Limoilou Titans	Quebec City, Quebec		1	
Drummondville Voltigeurs	Drummondville, Quebec		4	
André-Laurendeau Boomerang	Montreal, Quebec		0	
Édouard-Montpetit Lynx	Longueuil, Quebec		2	
Beauce-Appalaches Condors	Saint-Georges, Quebec		0	
John Abbott Islanders	Sainte-Anne-de-Bellevue, Quebec		1	
Dawson Blues	Montreal, Quebec		0	

== Summer collegiate ==
=== Northwoods League ===
Team	City	Established	League titles	Notes
Thunder Bay Border Cats	Thunder Bay, Ontario	2003	1	

=== Perfect Game Collegiate Baseball League ===
Team	City	Established	League titles	Notes
Niagara Ironbacks	St. Catharines, Ontario	2025	0	

=== West Coast League ===
Team	City	Established	League titles	Notes
Edmonton Riverhawks	Edmonton, Alberta	2022	0	
Kamloops NorthPaws	Kamloops, British Columbia	2022	0	
Kelowna Falcons	Kelowna, British Columbia	2000	0	
Nanaimo NightOwls	Nanaimo, British Columbia	2022	0	
Victoria HarbourCats	Victoria, British Columbia	2013	0	

=== Western Canadian Baseball League ===
Team	City	Established	League titles	Notes
Brooks Bombers	Brooks, Alberta	2016	0	
Energy City Cactus Rats	Spruce Grove, Alberta	2005	0	Formerly known as the Edmonton Big River Prospects (2005), St. Albert Prospects (2006–2007), and Edmonton Prospects (2008–2024)
Fort McMurray Giants	Fort McMurray, Alberta	2016	0	
Lethbridge Bulls	Lethbridge, Alberta	1999	0	
Medicine Hat Mavericks	Medicine Hat, Alberta	2003	1	
Moose Jaw Miller Express	Moose Jaw, Saskatchewan	1969	1/2	
Okotoks Dawgs	Okotoks, Alberta	2004	5	Known as Calgary Dawgs 2003–2005, leave of absence in 2006 while building Seaman Stadium in Okotoks
Regina Red Sox	Regina, Saskatchewan	1913	1	
Saskatoon Berries	Saskatoon, Saskatchewan	2023	0	
Swift Current 57's	Swift Current, Saskatchewan	1950	6	
Sylvan Lake Gulls	Sylvan Lake, Alberta	2021	0	
Weyburn Beavers	Weyburn, Saskatchewan	1969	0	

== See also ==
- List of defunct baseball teams in Canada
- Canada national baseball team
- List of Major League Baseball players from Canada
- Pearson Cup
- Washington Nationals, MLB; formerly the Montreal Expos (1969–2004) (National League)
- United League: A planned third league of Major League Baseball that was formed in the early 1990s and was to have begun play in the late 1990s in Canada and the United States.
- Canadian Baseball Hall of Fame
