= List of Canadian Football League stadiums =

The following is a list of stadiums in the Canadian Football League.

== Current stadiums ==
Image	Stadium	Capacity (seats)	City	Province	Playing surface	Roof type	Team	Division	Opened	Ref(s)
	BC Place	54,300 (Note: Capacity lowered for most games by closing off the upper deck.)	Vancouver	British Columbia	Artificial turf	Retractable roof	BC Lions	West Division	1983	
	BMO Field	25,000	Toronto	Ontario	Natural grass with artificial turf end zones (Note: End zones are only 18 yards long, rather than the regulation 20 yards.)	Open	Toronto Argonauts	East Division	2007	
	Commonwealth Stadium	56,302	Edmonton	Alberta	Artificial turf	Open	Edmonton Elks	West Division	1978	
	McMahon Stadium	35,650	Calgary	Alberta	Artificial turf	Open	Calgary Stampeders	West Division	1960	
	Mosaic Stadium	33,350	Regina	Saskatchewan	Artificial turf	Open	Saskatchewan Roughriders	West Division	2017	
	Percival Molson Memorial Stadium	23,035	Montreal	Quebec	Artificial turf (Note: End zone corners are cut off due to the running track circling the field.)	Open	Montreal Alouettes	East Division	1919	
	Princess Auto Stadium	32,343	Winnipeg	Manitoba	Artificial turf	Open	Winnipeg Blue Bombers	West Division	2013	
	TD Place Stadium	25,000	Ottawa	Ontario	Artificial turf	Open	Ottawa Redblacks	East Division	1908	
	Hamilton Stadium	24,390	Hamilton	Ontario	Artificial turf	Open	Hamilton Tiger-Cats	East Division	2014	

=== Map of current stadiums ===
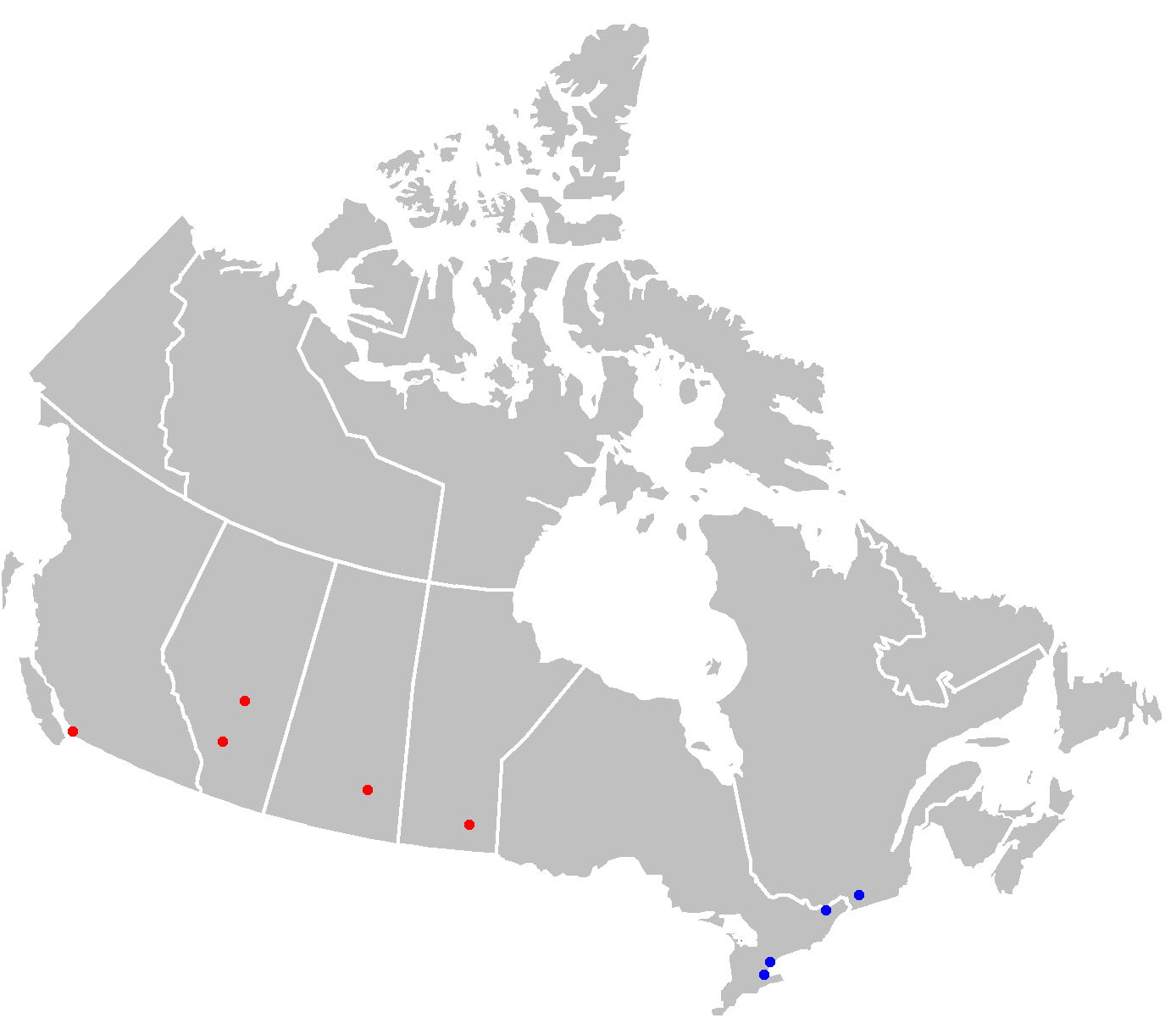

== Potential future stadiums ==
Stadium	Capacity	Location	Team	Opening	Status	Reference
Halifax Stadium	27,000	Wellington, Nova Scotia	TBD	2030	Stalled	
Name TBD (former site of Colisée de Québec)	25,000	Quebec City, Quebec	TBD	2030	Planned	

== Neutral site stadiums ==
Image	Stadium	Capacity	Location	Event	Opened	Reference
	Huskies Stadium	2,000 (Note: The seating capacity can increase to 10,000 via temporary seating.)	Halifax, Nova Scotia	CFL Touchdown Atlantic series (2005, ~~2020~~, 2023)	1970	
	Alumni Stadium	8,500 (Note: The seating capacity can increase to 13,362 via temporary seating.)	Guelph, Ontario	Hamilton Tiger-Cats (2013); Toronto Argonauts (2018, 2022–present)	1970	
	Moncton Stadium	8,300 (Note: The seating capacity can increase to 25,000 via temporary seating.)	Moncton, New Brunswick	CFL Touchdown Atlantic series (2010, 2011, 2013, 2019)	2010	
	Raymond Field	3,000 (Note: The seating capacity can increase to 5,000 via standing room.)	Wolfville, Nova Scotia	CFL Touchdown Atlantic series (2022)	1966	
	SMS Stadium at Shell Place	5,000 (Note: The seating capacity can increase to 15,000 via temporary seating.)	Fort McMurray, Alberta	Northern Kickoff (2015)	2015	
	Royal Athletic Park	3,800 (Note: The seating capacity can increase to 10,000-14,000 via temporary seating.)	Victoria, British Columbia	CFL Touchdown Pacific series (2024)	1908	
	Starlight Stadium	6,000	Langford, British Columbia	BC Lions (2025–present)	2009	
	Apple Bowl	2,314	Kelowna, British Columbia	CFL Touchdown Kelowna series (2026)	1995	

== Former stadiums ==
East Division
Team	Stadium	Years Used	Capacity	Opened	City	Ref(s)
Hamilton Tiger-Cats	Hamilton Amateur Athletic Association Grounds	1872–1949	Unknown	1872	Hamilton, Ontario	
Hamilton Tiger-Cats	Ivor Wynne Stadium	1950–2012	29,600	1930	Hamilton, Ontario	
Hamilton Tiger-Cats	Alumni Stadium	2013	13,362	1970	Guelph, Ontario	
Hamilton Tiger-Cats	Ron Joyce Stadium	2014	6,500	2008	Hamilton, Ontario	
Montreal Alouettes	Delorimier Stadium	1946–1953	20,000	1928	Montreal, Quebec	
Montreal Alouettes	Autostade	1968–1971; 1973–1976	33,172	1967	Montreal, Quebec	
Montreal Alouettes	Olympic Stadium	1976–1986; 1996–1998	66,308	1976	Montreal, Quebec	
Ottawa Redblacks	n/a	n/a	n/a	n/a	n/a	n/a
Toronto Argonauts	Rosedale Field	1874–1897; 1908–1915	4,000	1874	Toronto, Ontario	
Toronto Argonauts	Varsity Stadium	1898–1907; 1916–1924	10,000	1898	Toronto, Ontario	
Toronto Argonauts	Varsity Stadium	1925–1958	22,000	1924	Toronto, Ontario	
Toronto Argonauts	Exhibition Stadium	1959–1974	33,150	1948 in original form	Toronto, Ontario	
Toronto Argonauts	Exhibition Stadium	1975	41,890	1948 in original form	Toronto, Ontario	
Toronto Argonauts	Exhibition Stadium	1976–1988	54,741	1948 in original form	Toronto, Ontario	
Toronto Argonauts	Rogers Centre; SkyDome (1989–2005)	1989–2015	31,074	1989	Toronto, Ontario	
West Division
BC Lions	Empire Stadium	1954–1982	32,375	1954	Vancouver, British Columbia	
BC Lions	Empire Field	2010–2011	27,528	2010	Vancouver, British Columbia	
Calgary Stampeders	Mewata Stadium	1935–1959	10,000	1906	Calgary, Alberta	
Edmonton Elks	Clarke Stadium	1949–1978	20,000	1938	Edmonton, Alberta	
Saskatchewan Roughriders	Mosaic Stadium at Taylor Field; Taylor Field (1946–2006); Park de Young (1936–1946)	1936–2016	33,427	1936	Regina, Saskatchewan	
Winnipeg Blue Bombers	Osborne Stadium	1935–1952	7,800	1935	Winnipeg, Manitoba	
Winnipeg Blue Bombers	Canad Inns Stadium; Winnipeg Stadium (1953–2001)	1953	15,700	1953 in original form	Winnipeg, Manitoba	
Winnipeg Blue Bombers	Canad Inns Stadium; Winnipeg Stadium (1953–2001)	1954–1977	17,995	1953 in original form	Winnipeg, Manitoba	
Winnipeg Blue Bombers	Canad Inns Stadium; Winnipeg Stadium (1953–2001)	1978–1986	32,946	1953 in original form	Winnipeg, Manitoba	
Winnipeg Blue Bombers	Canad Inns Stadium; Winnipeg Stadium (1953–2001)	1987–1998	33,675	1953 in original form	Winnipeg, Manitoba	
Winnipeg Blue Bombers	Canad Inns Stadium; Winnipeg Stadium (1953–2001)	1999–2012	29,553	1953 in original form	Winnipeg, Manitoba	

== Defunct team stadiums ==
Team (former names)	Stadium (former names)	Years Used	Capacity	Opened	City	Ref(s)
Baltimore Stallions (1995) (Baltimore CFLers) (1994)	Memorial Stadium	1994–1995	53,371	1950	Baltimore, Maryland	
Birmingham Barracudas (1995)	Legion Field	1995	71,594	1926	Birmingham, Alabama	
Las Vegas Posse (1994)	Sam Boyd Stadium	1994	32,000	1971	Whitney, Nevada	
Memphis Mad Dogs (1995)	Liberty Bowl Memorial Stadium	1995	63,000	1967	Memphis, Tennessee	
Ottawa Rough Riders (1898–1924,1931–1996) (Ottawa Senators) (1925–1930) (Ottawa Football Club) (1876–1897)	Frank Clair Stadium; Lansdowne Park (1908–1993)	1908–1996	30,927	1908	Ottawa, Ontario	
Ottawa Renegades (2002–2005)	Frank Clair Stadium; Lansdowne Park (1908–1993)	2002–2005	30,927	1908	Ottawa, Ontario	
San Antonio Texans (1995) (Sacramento Gold Miners) (1993–1994)	Alamodome	1995	59,000	1993	San Antonio, Texas	
San Antonio Texans (1995) (Sacramento Gold Miners) (1993–1994)	Hornet Stadium	1993–1994	21,195	1968	Sacramento, California	
Shreveport Pirates (1994–1995)	Independence Stadium	1994–1995	51,000	1924	Shreveport, Louisiana	

== See also ==
- List of stadiums in Canada
- List of Canadian Football stadiums by capacity
- List of current National Football League stadiums
- List of European League of Football stadiums
- List of soccer stadiums in Canada
- List of indoor arenas in Canada
- List of Canadian Premier League stadiums
- Lists of stadiums
