= Saskatoon Berries (baseball) =

Canadian collegiate baseball team

- Logo

Information
- League: Western Canadian Baseball League (East)
- Location: Saskatoon, Saskatchewan
- Ballpark: Cairns Field
- Founded: 2023
- League championships: 1 (2026)
- Division championships: 1 (2026)
- Colours
- Ownership: Saskatoon Entertainment Group
- President: Steve Hildebrand
- Manager: Joe Carnahan
- Website: saskatoonberriesbaseballclub.ca

The Saskatoon Berries are a collegiate summer baseball team based in Saskatoon, Saskatchewan. Founded in 2023, the team began play in the Western Canadian Baseball League (WCBL) in 2024. The Berries host games at Cairns Field. The team holds the record for most wins in a season, having posted a 46–9 record in 2025, and won its first league championship in 2026.

== Team history ==
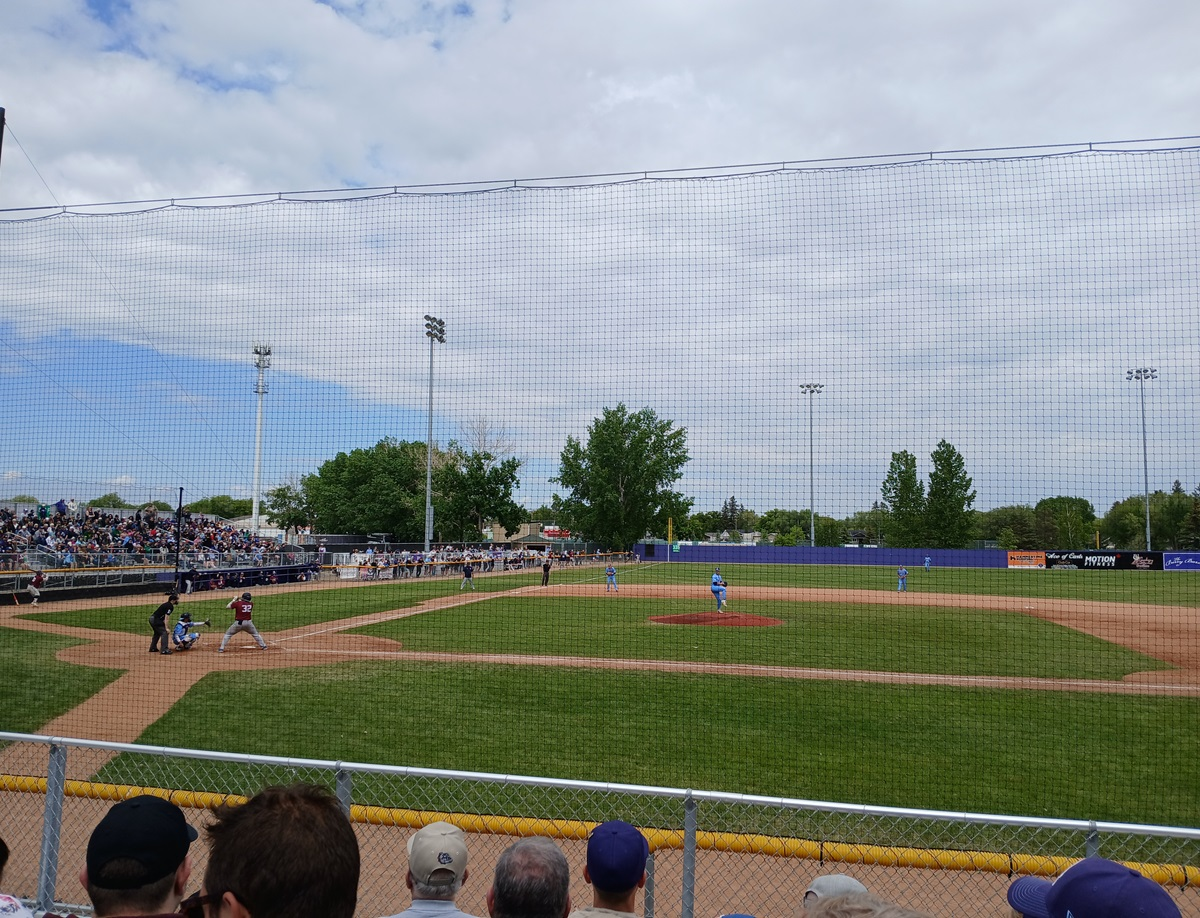
The Berries hosting the Lethbridge Bulls at Cairns Field in June 2024.

=== Founding and first season: 2023–2024 ===
Saskatoon has a long history with the WCBL, but was without a team for a decade after the Saskatoon Yellow Jackets folded in 2014. In March 2023, it was announced that Saskatoon had been awarded a WCBL expansion franchise that would begin play in 2024. The franchise is owned by Saskatoon Entertainment Group, run by father–son business partners Mike and Colin Priestner, which also owns the Saskatchewan Rush of the National Lacrosse League and the Saskatoon Blades of the Western Hockey League. The group signed a 10-year lease at Cairns Field and renovated the facilities there. The team launched a fan vote to name the new team. In July 2023, it was announced that Berries had won over the other nickname finalists, which included the Bridge Pigeons, Cobra Chickens, and River Pirates. Club president Steve Hildebrand called the name "uniquely Saskatoon." Before the end of the month, the team also unveiled its logo and team colours. Ahead of their inaugural season, the club announced a partnership with local minor baseball organizations that includes donating funds from game-day fundraisers.

In July, 2023, the Berries hired Joe Carnahan as its coach. Carnahan was a four-time WCBL coach of the year as manager for the Swift Current 57's, the team he helped lead to the WCBL championship three times. He also won three titles as a player for the 57's. In June 2024, the team added former Yellow Jacket and Major League Baseball pitcher Andrew Albers to its coaching staff. The team's inaugural season roster included eight players from Saskatchewan, including three pitchers hailing from Saskatoon.

The Berries played their first game in Regina on May 25, 2024, dropping a 5–4 game to the Regina Red Sox. The Berries hosted their first home game on May 28, losing again to the Red Sox by a score of 8–5 in front of a sold-out crowd of 2,200. The team earned its first ever win on May 31, defeating the Weyburn Beavers by a score of 5–0. The Berries' first home win came on June 1, when they defeated the Lethbridge Bulls by a score of 16–10. The team went on to compile a 31–25 record before defeating Medicine Hat Mavericks in the East Division playoff semifinal; the Berries lost the East Division Final against the Moose Jaw Miller Express. The Berries sold more than 55,000 tickets, the second most in the WCBL. The team was also notified by the New Era Cap Company that its hat was a top-seller among minor league teams in North America.

=== Regular season and League titles: 2025–2026 ===
In just the team's second season in 2025, the Berries set a new WCBL record for most wins with a record of 46–9. The Berries again advanced to the East Division final after avenging their 2024 loss to Moose Jaw in the semifinal; in the division final, they were defeated two games to one by eventual champions Regina, falling short of the title series.

In 2026, Carter Beck, who won WCBL rookie of the year honours in 2024, became the first Berries player drafted to Major League Baseball when he was selected by the Atlanta Braves.

The Berries followed up their record-breaking second season with a 38–18 record in 2026. The team avenged its 2025 playoff loss against the Red Sox, defeating Regina in the East Division semifinal, before sweeping top-seeded Moose Jaw in the division final to advance to the championship series for the first time. There, the Berries swept the Sylvan Lake Gulls in two games to win their first WCBL championship.

== Season-by-season record ==
League	Season	Manager	Regular season				Post season				Attendance
League	Season	Manager	Won	Lost	Win %	Finish	Won	Lost	Win %	Result	Attendance
League	WCBL										
2024	WCBL	Joe Carnahan	31	25	.554	3rd East	3	3	.500	Lost Eastern Division final	1,931
2025	WCBL	Joe Carnahan	46	9	.836	1st East	3	3	.500	Lost Eastern Division final	1,707
2026	WCBL	Joe Carnahan	38	18	.679	2nd East	6	1	.857	Won WCBL Championship	1,758
Totals			115	52	.689	—	12	7	.632		

== Honours ==
- WCBL

Regular Season East Division Winners (1): 2025
Best Regular Season record (1): 2025
East Division Champions (1): 2026
WCBL Champions (1): 2026

== See also ==
- List of baseball teams in Canada
