= RE/MAX Field =

Canadian baseball stadium

- Logo since 2017

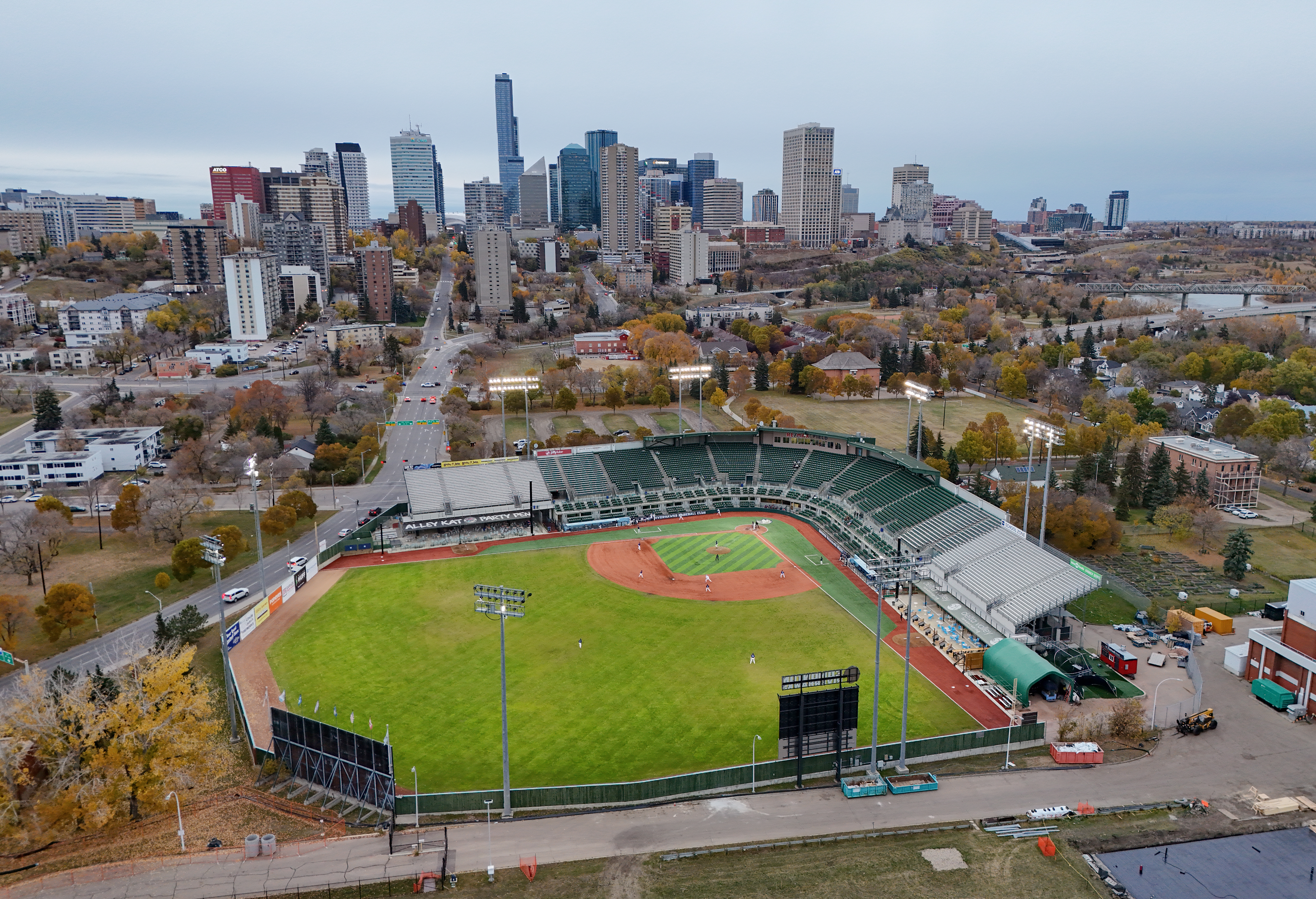

- Location in Edmonton
- Former names: Telus Field (1995–2015); Edmonton Ballpark (2016)
- Address: 10233 96 Avenue, Edmonton, Alberta
- Coordinates: 53°31′54″N 113°29′48″W
- Owner: City of Edmonton
- Capacity: 9,200
- Executive suites: 30
- Type: Baseball stadium
- Surface: FieldTurf (infield) (2005–present); Astroturf (infield) (1995–2004); Grass (outfield)
- Field size: Left: 340 ft (104 m); Centre: 420 ft (128 m); Right: 320 ft (97.5 m)
- Public transit: 9

Construction
- Opened: May 2, 1995

Tenants
- Edmonton Riverhawks (WCL) (2022–); Edmonton Collegiate Hawks (CCBC) (2022–); Edmonton Cubs (Sunburst League) (2013–); Edmonton Trappers (PCL) (1995–2004); Edmonton Cracker-Cats/Capitals (NAL) (2005–2011); Edmonton Prospects (WCBL) (2005, 2012–2019); Fort McMurray Giants (WCBL) (2016)

Website
- www.edmonton.ca/attractions_events/remax-field; riverhawksbaseball.com/remax-field

RE/MAX Field (formerly Edmonton Ballpark, and Telus Field) is a baseball stadium in Edmonton, Alberta, Canada. It has been home to several minor league baseball clubs; its last affiliated tenant was the Edmonton Trappers, a AAA Pacific Coast League club. It was also home to the Edmonton Capitals, an independent team that has been inactive since 2011. The Edmonton Prospects of the Western Canadian Baseball League (WCBL) were the main tenant from 2012 to 2019. The ballpark was mostly unused in 2020 and 2021 because of the COVID-19 pandemic, but the Edmonton Riverhawks of the West Coast League have been the main tenants since 2022. The facility is in the North Saskatchewan River Valley, in the neighbourhood of Rossdale.

== History ==
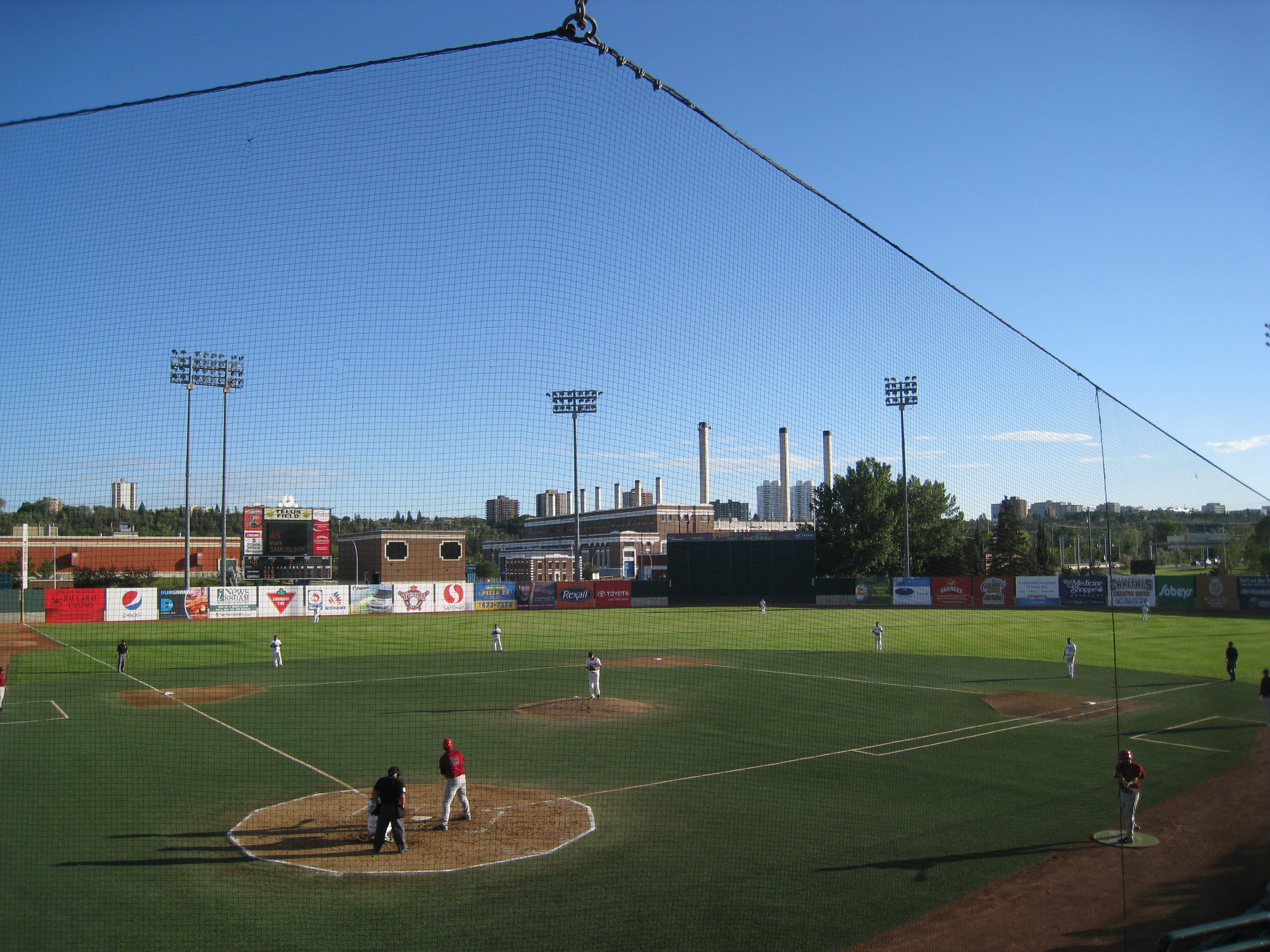
Telus Field in 2010

Opened in 1995, Telus Field replaced the 60-year-old John Ducey Park (formerly Renfrew Park) on the same site. The stadium's naming rights were purchased by the Telus Communications telecommunications company in September 1995 for a 14-year deal. It has 12-foot (3.7 m) walls all the way around except in centre field, where the batter's eye is a 34-foot (10 m) green monster which in 2008 was the third highest wall in professional baseball. Three players, Matthew LeCroy, Michael Cuddyer, and Todd Sears have hit home runs over it. Telus Field held the IBAF World Cup Women's baseball in the summer of 2004 and from July 25 to August 3, 2008, the park held the IBAF AAA World Junior Championships for the 7th time since it started in 1981.

Despite Telus's naming rights expiring in 2009 the stadium continued to use the name Telus Field until opening the 2016 season as Edmonton Ballpark, or simply Ballpark. Being displaced by the 2016 Fort McMurray wildfire, the Fort McMurray Giants played their inaugural season at the then Edmonton Ballpark. In May 2017 the stadium was renamed RE/MAX Field by the Edmonton Prospects; gaining naming rights and naming the park after the team's sponsor, RE/MAX, for three years.

On May 20, 2020, Baseball Edmonton Inc., a group led by former Edmonton Oilers player Randy Gregg, reached a deal with the city of Edmonton to lease the stadium for ten years. Gregg said that his group would try to secure an agreement for a second WCBL team to play at RE/MAX field, but he hoped the Prospects would continue to play there as well. However, the owner of the Prospects claimed the ongoing negotiations regarding their use of the field "[seemed] fraught with challenges." Gregg also outlined several possible plans to expand use of the field throughout the year, including the inclusion of minor baseball leagues, collaborations with local cultural and music groups, and an indoor attachment under the left field bleachers to allow for greater use of the facility during the winter. Baseball Edmonton Inc. advocated for the stadium to be included in the planned redevelopment of the Rossdale neighbourhood.

After discussions with the WCBL ended, Baseball Edmonton instead established an expansion team in the West Coast League, the Edmonton Riverhawks, and took over operations of the Edmonton Collegiate Baseball Club of the Canadian College Baseball Conference (which was renamed Edmonton Collegiate Hawks.) The Riverhawks debuted at RE/MAX Field for the 2022 season, after missing 2020 and 2021 due to the COVID-19 pandemic. The Prospects, now without a stadium, began construction on Myshak Metro Ballpark in 2023; as of 2026, the stadium remains unfinished.

== Features ==
RE/MAX Field uses natural grass in the outfield and FieldTurf in the infield; originally AstroTurf was used, before replaced in 2005 and again in 2021. Artificial turf was chosen for lower maintenance costs, because it allows for a better drainage system so the infield can return to a playable state quicker than a grass infield would, and to minimize damage to the infield when concerts are held at the stadium.

The park has ground-level luxury suites with box and general seating built on top. The Home Plate VIP Lounge on the main concourse is located directly behind the plate, incorporating a bar and a restaurant with a view of the field from seats inside and outside. The lounge includes trophies and pictures of early Edmonton baseball teams. The capacity of the stadium is 9,200.

The dimensions are 340 feet (104 m) to left field, 378 feet (115 m) to left centre, 420 feet (128 m) to centre field, 395 feet (120 m) to right centre and 320 feet (97.5 m) to right field.

The stadium concourse features pictures of historic moments in Trapper history, including Ron Kittle's 50-home-run season. There are also pictures from every Trapper championship and trophies.

== Concerts ==
Concerts have been held at the stadium on occasion:

- 1995 concerts included Tom Cochrane; Jeff Healey; The Beach Boys; The Village People and others.
- Jul 4, 1999: Blue Rodeo with Great Big Sea
- July 26, 1999: The Beach Boys
- July 15, 2000: Briefcase Blues in concert following an Edmonton Trappers game - after which the band members signed baseballs for fans.
- July 27, 2000: Johnny Rivers
- August 22, 2001: Blink-182 with Jimmy Eat World, New Found Glory, Sum 41
- June 13, 2002: Newsboys
- November 20, 2005: 2005 Tuyul Rugby Sevens
- July 1, 2006: The Headpins, Harlequin, Prism
- July 21, 2006: Default
- August 25, 2009: Big & Rich with Cowboy Troy, Dean Brody, Mike Plume Band
- September 4, 2009: Bryan Adams
- August 28, 2010: Rock the River West Tour (featuring Flyleaf, Skillet, Hawk Nelson, Starfield, Downhere, and Tedashii)
