= Carter Beck =

Canadian baseball player (born 2005)

Atlanta Braves
- Outfielder
- Born: June 28, 2005 (age 21); Estevan, Saskatchewan, Canada
- Bats: Left Throws: Right
- Stats at Baseball Reference

Carter Russell Beck (born June 28, 2005) is a Canadian professional baseball outfielder in the Atlanta Braves organization.

== Early life and amateur career ==
Beck was born on June 28, 2005, in Estevan, Saskatchewan, and raised in Carnduff, Saskatchewan, Canada. He grew up playing both baseball and ice hockey before deciding to focus on baseball during the COVID-19 pandemic. Beck attended Carnduff Education Complex, where he became the recipient of the Canada Cup Top Hitter Award and was twice selected Baseball 5K Player of the Year and Saskatchewan Premier Baseball League MVP, finishing with a batting average of .470 in his high school career. In 2022, Beck participated for Team Saskatchewan at the Canada Summer Games and was part of a bronze medal-winning team. He was Baseball Sask's 2022 Male Athlete of the Year. Beck also compete in Track & Field, where he won a gold medal in the four-even tetrathlon at the Saskatchewan High School Athletic Association's provincial Championships, while competing for Carnduff Education Complex.

After graduating from high school in 2023, Beck enrolled at the University of Mary in North Dakota, joining the Mary Marauders baseball team. There, he batted .432 and scored 12 home runs along with a team-best 53 runs batted in (RBIs), being selected the Northern Sun Intercollegiate Conference (NSIC) Freshman of the Year for the 2024 season. He also played for the Saskatoon Berries of the Western Canadian Baseball League (WCBL), earning league Rookie of the Year and Top Canadian honors for the 2024 season after batting .379 with 20 home runs with 81 RBIs. Beck transferred to Indiana State University in 2025 and was named first-team All-Missouri Valley Conference (MVC) for the Indiana State Sycamores in his first year after batting .335 with 11 home runs and 56 RBIs. He also returned to the Berries in 2025 and helped the team set the league record for single-season wins, with 46. Beck was a WCBL all-star and batted .385 in 2025. In 2026, for Indiana State, he batted .346 and scored 16 home runs while being named the MVC Joe Carter Player of the Year.

== Professional career ==
Beck was selected by the Atlanta Braves with the 26th overall pick of the 2026 Major League Baseball draft. He was the highest-selected Canadian in the 2026 draft and the highest-selected player from Saskatchewan all-time. He signed with Atlanta for a $2.7 million bonus on July 14, 2026.

== Personal life ==
Beck is the nephew of Carla Beck, the Saskatchewan Opposition Leader and leader of the Saskatchewan New Democratic Party.
