= Swift Current Indians =

Swift Current Indians may refer to:

- Swift Current 57's, a collegiate summer baseball team known as the Indians from 1959 to 2016
- Swift Current Broncos (SJHL), a defunct Junior A hockey team known as the Indians from 1983 to 1986
