= Energy City Cactus Rats =

Information
- League: Western Canadian Baseball League
- Location: Spruce Grove, Alberta, Canada
- Ballpark: Energy City Metro Ballpark (under construction)
- Founded: 2005
- Former name: Edmonton Prospects (2008–2024); St. Albert Prospects (2006–2007); Edmonton Big River Prospects (2005)
- Former ballparks: Centennial Park Diamond No. 9 (2021–2022, 2024); RE/MAX Field (2005, 2012–2019); John Fry Park (2009–2011); Legion Memorial Ball Park (2006–2007)
- Colours: blue, gray, neon yellow, brown, black and white
- Ownership: Gold Sports and Entertainment Corp.
- Website: energycitycactusrats.com

The Energy City Cactus Rats are a collegiate summer baseball team based in Spruce Grove, Alberta, Canada. They play in the Western Canadian Baseball League. The team was founded in 2005 as the Edmonton Big River Prospects but moved from Edmonton to the neighbouring city of St. Albert after only one year of use of Telus Field with the Edmonton Cracker-Cats of the Northern League. They took a leave of absence for the 2008 season before returning in 2009 as the Edmonton Prospects.

Prior to the 2012 season they played at John Fry Park on the south side of Edmonton. In 2012 the Prospects began playing at Telus Field, which was renamed RE/MAX Field in 2017 after Prospects' management put together a proposal with RE/MAX Real Estate for naming rights. The Prospects continued to play at RE/MAX Field from 2012 through 2019. The 2020 season was cancelled due to the COVID-19 pandemic.

After the Edmonton Riverhawks secured a 10-year lease on RE/MAX Field beginning in 2021, the Prospects were left without a home stadium. The team played the 2021 and 2022 seasons with Centennial Park in Sherwood Park as their home base, while planning to move to Energy City Metro Ballpark in Spruce Grove in 2023.

Because of construction delays on the new ballpark, the team did not play in 2023 and returned to Sherwood Park for 2024.

In March 2025, the Prospects were renamed the Energy City Cactus Rats. The team expected its new ballpark to be ready during the 2025 season, but due to construction delays played the season as a road team. As of May 2026, there was still no definitive date set for the ballpark's opening.

On 16 June 2026, the WCBL Board of Governors voted to let the Cactus Rats play at the unfinished ballpark with no fans in attendance as their occupancy permit only allowed for teams, an umpiring crew, and support staff. No completion date for the ballpark was announced. The first game was played on 17 June with the Okotoks Dawgs winning 4–1. This arrangement did not continue into the playoffs; the Cactus Rats played both of their 2026 postseason games on the road, losing as the home and away team to the Okotoks Dawgs at Seaman Stadium.

On 17 November 2026, the WCBL enacted a one-season suspension for the Cactus Rats effective in 2027 over missed milestone deadlines for construction progress at the ballpark. The league said the decision would give the Cactus Rats time and opportunity to fully prepare the ballpark for play in 2028.

== See also ==
- List of baseball teams in Canada
