= Weyburn Beavers =

Weyburn Beavers may refer to:

- Weyburn Beavers, a team in the Saskatchewan Senior Hockey League
- Weyburn Beavers, a team in the Western Canadian Baseball League
