= 2014 Edmonton shooting =

2014 mass murder in Alberta, Canada

Edmonton shooting
- Location: Edmonton, Alberta, Canada
- Date: December 29, 2014
- Attack type: Spree shooting; familicide; murder-suicide; mass shooting, mass murder
- Weapon: 9mm semi-automatic handgun
- Deaths: 9 (including the perpetrator)
- Injuries: 0
- Perpetrator: Phu Lam

On December 29, 2014, 53-year-old Phu Lam committed a shooting spree in Edmonton, Alberta, Canada. He shot and killed eight people, including two children, most of whom were his relatives. He committed suicide at VN Express, a Vietnamese/Chinese restaurant in Fort Saskatchewan, Northeast of Edmonton.

== Details ==
Lam killed seven relatives, including two children under the age of ten, in a house in north Edmonton. Lam then went into another house in the Haddow neighbourhood of Edmonton and killed Cyndi Duong. He then drove to Fort Saskatchewan where he entered a Chinese/Vietnamese restaurant, where he had after hours access in order to complete kitchen repairs, and committed suicide by shooting himself. Police entered the restaurant at 7:34 a.m. on December 30, where they found Lam's body.

== Victims ==
The victims were:

- Klarvatten house: Phu Lam's wife, Thuy-tien Truong (known as Tien Truong), 35, and her eight-year-old son, Elvis Lam; her father Van-dang Truong, 55; her mother, Thi-dau Le, 55; her sister, Thanh-ha-thi Truong (known as Ha Truong), 33; her sister's daughter, Valentina Nguyen, 3; Viet Nguyen, 41, Tien Truong's male friend.
- Haddow house: Cyndi Duong, 36.

== Perpetrator ==
Phu Lam (aged 53) was raised in Vietnam, and had lived in Canada since 1979. Lam had an extensive criminal record dating back to 1987, which included drug and violence-related offenses. He met his wife, who was 18 years younger, on a trip to his home country of Vietnam in 2000. The couple married six months later and she came to Canada in 2003. At the time of the shooting, he was in bankruptcy proceedings and owed a large amount of money on at least a dozen credit cards due to a gambling problem. Lam was arrested twice in Edmonton, for sexual and domestic assault. The 9mm handgun used in the shooting was registered in 1997 but was stolen in 2006 from Surrey, British Columbia. In November 2012, a complaint was filed against Lam after he threatened to kill his ex-wife Thuy Tien Truong and five other relatives.

== See also ==
- 2014 Calgary stabbing
- Claresholm highway massacre
