= Medicine Hat Mavericks =

Collegiate summer baseball team in Alberta, Canada

Information
- League: Western Canadian Baseball League
- Location: Medicine Hat, Alberta
- Ballpark: Athletic Park
- Founded: 2003
- League championships: 2003, 2014, 2018
- Colours: Red, White, Black
- Ownership: Greg Morrison
- General manager: Greg Morrison
- Coach: Ryan Reed
- Website: themavericks.ca

The Medicine Hat Mavericks are a collegiate summer baseball team that plays in the Western Canadian Baseball League. Based in Medicine Hat, Alberta, Canada, they began play in 2003. They currently play at Athletic Park, a 2200-seat diamond located on the banks of the South Saskatchewan River.

== History ==
The Mavericks were founded in 2003 by Jim and Carol Hern, a pair of local ranch-owners, as an expansion team alongside the Calgary Dawgs in the then Western Major Baseball League (now the Western Canadian Baseball League). The team filled the vacancy left at Athletic Park when the Toronto Blue Jays ended their affiliation with the Medicine Hat Blue Jays of the Pioneer League in 2002.

In 2009, Greg Morrison, a local business owner and former prospect of both the Toronto Blue Jays and Los Angeles Dodgers became owner and general manager of the Mavericks, purchasing the team from the Hern family.

Throughout their history, the Mavericks have won the League Championship three times, during their inaugural season in 2003, then in 2014, and in 2018. In 2023, the Mavericks would make it to the championship finals against the Okotoks Dawgs, losing 13–5 in the third and deciding game.

== Season-by-Season Results ==
Medicine Hat Mavericks season-by-season results (since 2011)
Season	Regular-season record	Division finish	Playoff result	Championship status
2011	34-16	2nd, West	Lost semifinal	—
2012	31-15	1st, West	Lost Championship	Runner-up
2013	39–7	1st, West	Lost Championship	Runner-up
2014	25-21	2nd, West	Won Championship	Champions
2015	25-23	3rd, West	Lost West Division final	—
2016	30-16	2nd, West	Lost West Division final	—
2017	27-21	3rd, West	Lost West Division final	—
2018	38-9	1st, West	Won Championship	Champions
2019	30-26	3rd, West	Lost West Division semifinal	—
2020	Season cancelled due to the COVID-19 pandemic			
2021	Did not participate due to the COVID-19 pandemic			
2022	18–38	4th, East	Lost East Division final	—
2023	30-26	2nd, East	Lost Championship	Runner-up
2024	33-23	2nd, East	Lost East Division semifinal	—
2025	34–21	2nd, East	Lost East Division semifinal	—
2026	22–34	4th, East	Lost East Division semifinal	—
