= Claresholm highway shooting =

2011 murder–suicide in Alberta, Canada

- Location: 50.048°N 113.591°W; Claresholm, Alberta, Canada
- Date: December 15, 2011; ~3:30 a.m. MST (UTC-07:00)
- Attack type: Murder–suicide, mass shooting, mass murder, ex-uxoricide
- Weapon: Heckler & Koch P30L 9mm handgun
- Deaths: 4 (including the perpetrator)
- Injuries: 1
- Perpetrator: Derek Jensen

The Claresholm highway shooting was a murder–suicide that occurred on December 15, 2011, on Alberta Highway 2, just north of Claresholm, Alberta, Canada. The suspect, 21-year-old Derek Jensen, killed three people with a Heckler & Koch 9mm handgun, before killing himself. Jensen killed his ex-girlfriend, Tabitha Stepple, and two men she was travelling with, who were part of the Lethbridge Bulls baseball team.

== Background ==
The suspect, 21-year-old Derek Jensen, grew up in Lethbridge. Prior to the massacre he was training to become a paramedic in Edmonton. He had met his ex-girlfriend, 21-year-old Tabitha Stepple in a downtown Lethbridge nightclub. The couple had moved into a basement suite together, but after mounting tensions between them, they eventually split sometime around Halloween. Despite the split the two of them still lived together. No domestic relationship violence had ever been reported and neither Stepple or Jensen was known to the police.

== Shooting ==
On the night of December 14, 2011, a group of Jensen's friends took him out to a pub in Lethbridge. Inside, Jensen came across Stepple, who was visiting with two other men, 20-year-old Mitch Maclean and 22-year-old Tanner Craswell. The two of them were rising baseball stars who had moved to Lethbridge from Prince Edward Island to play for the Lethbridge Bulls baseball team. 21-year-old Shayna Conway was also with them, and was the girlfriend of Craswell, who was out celebrating his 22nd birthday. Stepple was with them because she worked with Conway. Enraged at seeing his ex-girlfriend with other men, Jensen confronted Stepple and pushed her out of a chair. After an argument between them, Jensen and his friends left the bar and headed to a nearby club, before Jensen left, telling his friends he was heading home. Meanwhile, Maclean and Craswell had plans to leave Lethbridge after celebrating Craswell's birthday. The two of them had a 5 a.m. flight out of Calgary International Airport for Prince Edward Island, as they were returning home for Christmas. Stepple and Conway were to drive them to the airport in Stepple's Ford Escape. The four of them left Lethbridge around midnight and eventually drove north towards Calgary airport along Highway 2.

Jensen was also driving north on Highway 2 in his green Pontiac Sunfire in search of Stepple. After the argument in the pub, Jensen had reportedly kept phoning Stepple and had told her "This night's not going to end well for you, I hope you know that". In Claresholm, Jensen located the group at a 7-Eleven convenience store. The four of them had stopped there briefly at around 3 a.m. on the morning of December 15. Surveillance video showed that the group were unaware Jensen was there and there was no confrontation between them. Moments after leaving the store, at around 3:30 a.m., the group was travelling north on Highway 2 when Jensen rammed the back of their SUV in his car. They were positioned just north of Claresholm and approximately 130 kilometers south of Calgary. Conway stopped the vehicle and got out to confront the driver, unaware it was Jensen. Jensen then jumped out of his vehicle, aimed a 9mm handgun at her and shot Conway three times. He then fired off several rounds into the SUV, striking and killing Stepple and Craswell as they sat in the vehicle. Maclean was also shot, but managed to escape the vehicle. Jensen then turned the gun on himself and took his own life.

== Aftermath ==
The body of Maclean was found by police in a ditch on the east side of the highway. He was rushed to the local Claresholm hospital by ambulance and was then airlifted to Foothills Medical Centre in Calgary, but died during the transfer on the way there. Conway had been shot three times, but managed to crawl to a cellphone which she used to called 911. She was taken to the Foothills Medical Centre where she underwent surgery. Despite her injuries she made a full recovery. While searching Jensen's vehicle, officers discovered two more firearms. Jensen had also been armed with a Winchester rifle and a loaded 12-gauge shotgun. All three of the weapons owned by Jensen had been registered. Officers also seized another firearm and additional ammunition from Jensen's home in Lethbridge.

== Legacy ==
In 2013, CTV aired an hour-long documentary about the killings titled Road to Murder. The documentary was produced and directed by Larry Day, and hosted by CTV news anchor Lloyd Robertson.

== See also ==
- List of massacres in Canada
- 2014 Calgary stabbing
- Edmonton shooting
- Crime in Alberta
