= Medicine Hat Blue Jays =

- 1977–2002; Medicine Hat, Alberta

Minor league affiliations
- Class: Rookie (1977–2002)
- League: Pioneer League (1977–2002)

Major league affiliations
- Team: Toronto Blue Jays (1978–2002); Oakland Athletics (1977)

Minor league titles
- League titles (1): 1982

Team data
- Name: Medicine Hat Blue Jays (1978–2002); Medicine Hat A's (1977)
- Ballpark: Athletic Park

The Medicine Hat Blue Jays were a Rookie League affiliate of the Toronto Blue Jays, playing in the Pioneer League and located in the city of Medicine Hat, Alberta, Canada. They played a total of 26 seasons; 1977 through 2002. In 1977 they were an affiliate of the Oakland Athletics and played as the Medicine Hat A's. Their home field was Athletic Park.

== History ==
The A's arrived in Medicine Hat in 1977, an expansion team for the Pioneer League along with the Calgary Cardinals. The A's had relocated from Boise, Idaho, where they had played two seasons as the Boise A's in the Northwest League. The A's finished in fifth place within the six-team Pioneer League; four members of the team would go on to appear in the major leagues. After the season, the team changed their affiliation to the Toronto Blue Jays and played 25 seasons as the Medicine Hat Blue Jays.

Over the years, the Medicine Hat club generally struggled on the field and with attendance, but the Jays did have some noteworthy seasons. In 1982, they captured their only championship. They reached the championship series again in 1995 but lost the title to the Helena Brewers. The Blue Jays only reached the playoffs one other time, losing to the Great Falls Dodgers in 2000.

After the 2002 season, Toronto ended their affiliation with the club (switching to the Pulaski Blue Jays), and the Pioneer League left Medicine Hat. The Blue Jays relocated to Montana and became the second incarnation of the Helena Brewers.

== Notable alumni ==
Over the years, some of the most notable players to wear a Medicine Hat uniform included:

- Chris Carpenter
- David Wells
- Lloyd Moseby
- Fred Manrique
- John Cerutti
- Gustavo Chacín
- Randy Knorr
- Jimmy Key
- Carlos Delgado
- Pat Borders
- Mark Eichhorn
- Mike Timlin
- Jay Gibbons (won the league's Triple Crown in 1998)
- Greg Morrison (won the league's Triple Crown in 1997) (Note: Morrison, a native of Medicine Hat, played for the Medicine Hat Blue Jays in 1997. That season, he won the Pioneer League's Triple Crown by recording a .448 batting average, 23 home runs, and 88 runs batted in. He also won league MVP and his 23 home runs set a league record for the most in a single season. This accomplishment remains the Pioneer League single season record. Drafted by the Los Angeles Dodgers in 1994, Morrison played in Great Falls and Savannah within the Dodgers system in 1995 and 1996. After his stint with the Medicine Hat Blue Jays in 1997, he played in Hagerstown and Dunedin in 1998 and 1999 within the Blue Jays system. From 2000 to 2006 Morrison played for a number of teams in the independent Northern League. Morrison is currently the owner and general manager of the Medicine Hat Mavericks of the Western Major Baseball League.)
- Barry Morphew

== See also ==
- Medicine Hat A's players
- Medicine Hat Blue Jays players
