= Energy City Metro Ballpark =

Baseball stadium

- Location within Alberta Location within Canada
- Interactive map of Energy City Metro Ballpark
- Address: Highway 16A and Pioneer Road; Spruce Grove, Alberta; Canada
- Coordinates: 53.5447°N 113.8591°W
- Operator: Gold Sports and Entertainment Group Corp.
- Capacity: 3,470

Construction
- Groundbreaking: 2023
- Builder: JEN COL Construction

Tenants
- Energy City Cactus Rats (WCBL) (future)

Website
- myshakmetroballpark.com

Energy City Metro Ballpark is an under construction 3,470-seat baseball park in Spruce Grove, Alberta, Canada. It is the home of the Energy City Cactus Rats, a Western Canadian Baseball League (WCBL) team playing in the West Division. The ballpark was initially known as Spruce Grove Metro Ballpark and later Myshak Metro Ballpark during planning and construction. Construction began in 2023; as of May 2026, there was still no definitive date set for the ballpark's opening.

On 16 June 2026, the WCBL Board of Governors voted to let the Cactus Rats play at the unfinished ballpark with no fans in attendance as their occupancy permit only allows for teams, an umpiring crew, and support staff. No completion date for the ballpark was announced. The first game was played on 17 June with the Okotoks Dawgs winning 4–1. This arrangement did not continue into the playoffs; the Cactus Rats played both of their 2026 postseason games on the road, losing as the home and away team to the Okotoks Dawgs at Seaman Stadium.

On 17 November 2026, the WCBL enacted a one-season suspension for the Cactus Rats effective in 2027 over missed milestone deadlines for construction progress at the ballpark. The league said the decision would give the Cactus Rats time and opportunity to fully prepare the ballpark for play in 2028.

The ballpark is part of a privately financed development by the Spruce Gold Partnership and will feature a microbrewery, an outdoor amphitheatre, an 80-unit condominium building known as the DiMaggio as well as a field house and an auditorium.

The stadium itself will include a 360-degree concourse that wraps around the stadium, 2,200 lower-bowl seats, as well as options for Founders Club seats and Skybox Suites seats.
