= 2014 Calgary stabbing =

2014 mass murder in Alberta, Canada

- Location: 51°5′25.4″N 114°7′35.4″W; 11 Butler Crescent NW, Calgary, Alberta, Canada
- Date: April 15, 2014; 1:20 a.m. MDT (UTC−06:00)
- Attack type: Mass stabbing, mass murder
- Weapon: Large knife
- Deaths: 5
- Perpetrator: Matthew de Grood
- Motive: Mental illness

On April 15, 2014, Matthew de Grood, son of Calgary Police inspector Doug de Grood, stabbed five young adults to death at a house party in the Brentwood neighbourhood of Calgary, Alberta, Canada. The party was several blocks away from the University of Calgary campus, and held to mark the end of its school year. This incident marked the deadliest massacre in Calgary's history.

== Stabbing and victims ==
The attack occurred at 1:20 a.m. at a house at 11 Butler Crescent, where about thirty people were at a party. The assailant, an invited guest, attacked shortly after arriving at the party. He obtained a large knife at the house and stabbed each victim multiple times. Fleeing on foot, de Grood was arrested by police 40 minutes later with the aid of the K-9 unit.

The victims were Joshua Hunter, Kaitlin Perras, Jordan Segura, Lawrence Hong, and Zackariah Rathwell. They ranged from 21 to 27 years of age. Hunter lived in Priddis, Alberta, and the other four lived in Calgary. Hong, Segura, and Rathwell were pronounced dead at the scene, while Perras and Hunter died in the hospital.

== Perpetrator ==
Matthew de Grood, aged 22, was identified as the suspect. A Safeway employee and University of Calgary student, he planned to attend law school. He is the son of a city police officer with the rank of inspector. He was held at a secure psychiatric facility adjacent to the Calgary Remand Centre. According to authorities, de Grood personally knew at least one person present during the party. According to his parents and classmates, his behaviour began to change weeks before the stabbings, posting more frequently on Facebook, including "bizarre" status updates. Hours before the killings, he posted the title of the Megadeth song "Dread and the Fugitive Mind" to his Facebook page. Prior to the stabbing, he sent text messages to his parents, claiming he was going to harm himself. He was found with garlic in his pocket at the time of arrest. Though he had posted online about killing vampires, he told police the garlic was intended to "keep zombies away".

De Grood was charged with five counts of first-degree murder and was ordered to stand trial on May 29, 2015. He had no previous run-ins with the police. On May 22, he was found mentally fit to stand trial after undergoing a psychiatric assessment. On May 29, 2015, his trial was set to begin on May 16, 2016, with jury selection set to begin four days earlier.

On May 25, 2016, de Grood was found not criminally responsible for the homicides on the basis of a mental disorder (schizophrenia, per two of three expert witnesses) that caused a psychotic episode during the killings. According to his lawyer, Allan Fay, he intentionally killed the five victims, believing they were werewolves and vampires who threatened his life. The NCR order means de Grood will be locked down in a psychiatric facility receiving periodic reviews that could lead to release under certain conditions.

De Grood told the Alberta Review Board he wishes the "terrible tragedy" had never happened.

In September 2019, de Grood was granted unsupervised outings by the Alberta Review Board, although they say he "remains a significant risk to the safety of the public."

In December 2023, the Alberta Criminal Code Review Board refused de Grood's request for discharge. The board cited ongoing concerns regarding potential risk to the public and the need for continued structured psychiatric care, preventing his move to a less supervised setting. At a subsequent review by the Alberta Criminal Code Review Board in 2025, de Grood's psychiatrist said that his schizophrenia was in remission and that he was now at a low risk to reoffend. De Grood was now living in a supervised setting and was being seen regularly by an outreach worker. The Board ruled that de Grood could now travel to British Columbia and Ontario in the company of a responsible adult, as well as passes to visit his family's home.

== University response ==
Although the stabbings occurred off-campus, the close relationship between the parties involved and the University of Calgary elicited a direct response from the school's community. University president M. Elizabeth Cannon described the event as a "senseless tragedy" in which the community "lost a part of its family."

On April 15, 2015, the university held the UCalgaryStrong Festival, celebrating the end of the school year and commemorating the one-year anniversary of the stabbing. The festival was part of the broader UCalgaryStrong initiative, which aims to "reduce loneliness and isolation, and foster resiliency in the face of the stressors that are part of the post-secondary experience." Victim Lawrence Hong was granted a posthumous degree in 2015, and memorial scholarships have been established for him and two other victims, Joshua Hunter and Jordan Segura, in their respective disciplines. Zackariah Rathwell was granted a posthumous degree in 2015 from the Alberta College of Art and Design.

== See also ==
- Claresholm highway massacre
- Edmonton shooting
