= Kiwanis Park =

Baseball venue in Moncton, New Brunswick, Canada

Coordinates: 46.096388°N 64.799563°W

Kiwanis Park is a 3,500-seat baseball field located in Moncton, New Brunswick. The field was donated to the City of Moncton in 1953 by the local Kiwanis Club. It is the largest baseball field in Canada east of Quebec City. The field is the current home of the Moncton Mets (formerly the Moncton Fisher Cats) and also, the Junior and Minor league Metro Mudcats. It has played host to many baseball tournaments including the 1975 Intercontinental Cup, the 1997 World Junior Baseball Championship, the 2004 Baseball Canada Senior Championships, and the Baseball Canada Cup in 1994, 2011 and 2018.

In June 2010, the a $2 million upgrade was completed which included artificial turf, bleachers, bullpens, new dugouts, new sod, outfield fence, a modern drainage system, and a new lighting system.

== See also ==
- Moncton Sport Facilities
