= Fergie Jenkins Field =

Baseball stadium in Chatham, Ontario, Canada

Coordinates: 42.389152°N 82.176884°W

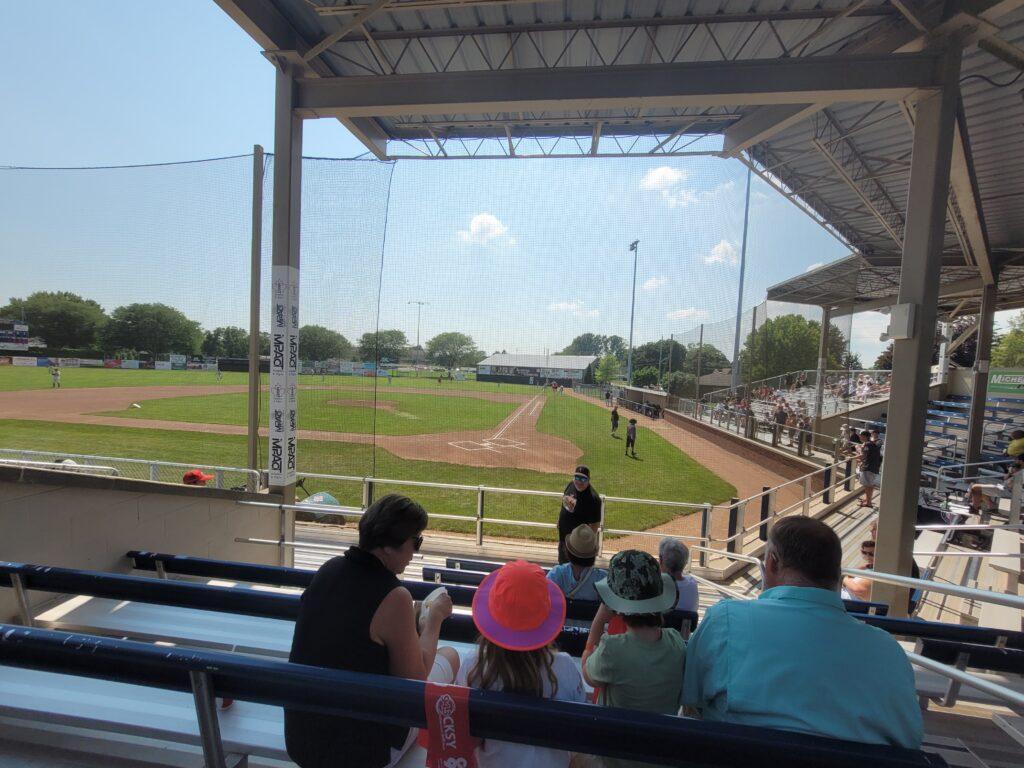
- Jenkins Field in 2024
- Interactive map of Fergie Jenkins Field
- Address: 30 Tweedsmuir Ave; Chatham. ON; Canada
- Capacity: 1,443
- Surface: Grass

Construction
- Opened: 1950s

Tenant
- Chatham-Kent Barnstormers (CBL) (2024-present)

Fergie Jenkins Field is a baseball stadium located in Chatham, Ontario, Canada. It is home to the Chatham-Kent Barnstormers of the Canadian Baseball League. The stadium is named after National Baseball Hall of Fame member and Chatham native Ferguson Jenkins.

== History ==
The park was originally constructed in the early 1950s and was home to several championship winning teams from the Ontario Baseball Association. the ballpark fell into disrepair in the 1970s, with the original grandstand being demolished in 1984. in more recent years the field has undergone improvements by the Friends Of Rotary Park and the Chatham Rotary Club, resulting in new grass, fencing, dugouts, scoreboard and a new main grandstand constructed in 2010.

In 2024 the park became home to the Chatham-Kent Barnstormers of the Canadian Baseball League.
