= Spitz Stadium =

Stadium in Lethbridge, Alberta, Canada

Coordinates: 49.689739°N 112.80545°W

- Interactive map of Spitz Stadium
- Former names: Henderson Stadium
- Address: 2601 Parkside Drive South; Lethbridge, Alberta; T1J 4W3
- Owner: City of Lethbridge
- Operator: City of Lethbridge
- Capacity: 2,200
- Surface: Grass

Construction
- Opened: 1977

Tenants
- Lethbridge Bulls (WCBL) (1999–present) Lethbridge Black Diamonds (Pioneer League) (1996–98); Lethbridge Mounties (Pioneer League) (1992–95) Lethbridge Dodgers (Pioneer League) (1977–83)

Spitz Stadium is a stadium in Henderson Park of Lethbridge, Alberta, Canada.

Location of Spitz Stadium in Lethbridge

It is used primarily for baseball. It is the home of the Lethbridge Bulls, a Western Canadian Baseball League team, and was the home of the Lethbridge Black Diamonds of the Pioneer League. The ballpark has a capacity of 2,200 people and was opened in 1977.

The City of Lethbridge renamed the stadium from Henderson Stadium in 2008, after it signed a 15-year agreement with Spitz International snack foods company, wherein Spitz received naming rights for that period and would provide $500,000 for renovation or upgrades until 2013. The sponsorship was later extended to the 2029 season.
