= New Brunswick Senior Baseball League =

Amateur baseball league

The New Brunswick Senior Baseball League is the highest level of amateur baseball play in New Brunswick, Canada.

== Current teams ==
Team	City	Venue
Moncton Mets	Moncton, New Brunswick	Kiwanis Park
Saint John Alpines	Saint John, New Brunswick	Memorial Field
Chatham Ironmen	Miramichi, New Brunswick	Ironmen Field
Fredericton Royals	Fredericton, New Brunswick	Royals Field
Charlottetown Islanders	Charlottetown, PEI	Victoria Park

== List of league champions ==
LEAGUE CHAMPIONS
1929 Moncton Catholic Club	1930 Moncton Catholic Club	1931 St. Stephen Mohawks	1932 St. Stephen Kiwan's
1933 St. Stephen Kiwan's	1934 St. Stephen Kiwan's	1935 St. Stephen Mill Kiwan's	1936 St. Stephen St.Croix
1937 St. Stephen St.Croix	1938 St. Stephen St.Croix	1939 St. Stephen St.Croix	1940 Devon Tigers
1941 Devon Tigers	1942 Saint John Ironmen	1943 Saint John Dockman	1944 Saint John St. Peters
1945 Saint John St. Peters	1946 Saint John St. Peters	1947 Marysville Royals	1948 Marysville Royals
1949 Fredericton Capitals	1950 Moncton Legionnaires	1951 Moncton Legionnaires	1952 Woodstock Lions
1953 Woodstock Lions	1954 Dalhousie Dodgers	1955 Marysville Royals	1956 Woodstock Elks
1957 Saint John St. Peters	1958 Woodstock Elks	1959 Woodstock Elks	1960 Moncton Cubs
1961 Saint John St. Peters	1962 Memramcook Rovers	1963 Saint John St. Peters	1964 St. Stephen St. Croix
1965 Moncton Schooners	1966 Moncton Schooners	1967 Chatham Ironmen	1968 Chatham Ironmen
1969 Milltown Legionnaires	1970 Edmundston Republicans	1971 Edmundston Republicans	1972 Fredericton Vikings
1973 Marysville	1974 Chatham Ironmen	1975 Chatham Ironmen	1976 Chatham Ironmen
1977 Fredericton Granadas	1978 Chatham Ironmen	1979 Woodstock Shiretowners	1980 Marysville Royals
1981 Chatham Ironmen	1982 Saint John Dodgers	1983 Marysville Royals	1984 Marysville Royals
1985 Moncton Mets*	1986 Moncton Mets*	1987 Moncton Mets*	1988 Moncton Mets*
1989 Moncton Mets	1990 Fredericton Schooners	1991 Moncton Mets	1992 Newcastle Cardinals
1993 Saint John Alpines	1994 Saint John Alpines	1995 Fredericton Royals	1996 Saint John Alpines
1997 Fredericton Royals	1998 Chatham Ironmen	1999 Fredericton Royals	2000 Saint John Alpines
2001 Saint John Alpines	2002 Fredericton Royals	2003 Fredericton Royals	2004 Chatham Ironmen
2005 Moncton Mets	2006 Fredericton Royals	2007 Fredericton Royals	2008 Fredericton Royals
2009 Fredericton Royals	2010 Fredericton Royals	2011 Chatham Ironmen	2012 Fredericton Royals
2013 Chatham Ironmen	2014 Fredericton Royals	2015 Charlottetown Islanders	2016 Fredericton Royals
2017 Moncton Fisher Cats	2018 Chatham Ironmen	2019 Moncton Fisher Cats	2020 Season Cancelled Due to COVID-19
2021 Charlottetown Islanders	2022 Saint John Alpines	2023 Charlottetown Islanders	2024 Charlottetown Islanders
2025 Charlottetown Islanders	2026 Charlottetown Islanders		

== See also ==
- Baseball awards § Canada
- New Brunswick Senior Baseball League
- Moncton Fisher Cats
- Chatham Ironmen
- Fredericton Royals
- Saint John Alpines
- Charlottetown Islanders
