= List of indoor arenas in Canada =

The following is a list of indoor arenas in Canada with a capacity of at least 3,000 for sporting events. The arenas in the table are ranked by capacity; the arenas with the highest capacities are listed first.

== Current arenas ==
Canada's largest indoor arenas by seating capacity for ice hockey. Rows shaded in yellow indicates arenas that are home to an NHL and/or NBA franchise.

#	Image	Arena	City	Province/ter.	Maximum	Hockey	Basketb.	Pro	Jr.	Major tenant(s)	Built
1	Bell Centre interior, Apr 2016 vs Arizona Coyotes	Bell Centre	Montreal	Quebec	21,105	21,302	21,700	NHL		Montreal Canadiens	1996
2		Rogers Place	Edmonton	Alberta	20,734	18,641	19,500	NHL	WHL	Edmonton Oilers, Edmonton Oil Kings	2016
3	Scotiabank Place	Canadian Tire Centre	Ottawa	Ontario	20,500	19,153		NHL, NLL		Ottawa Senators, Ottawa Black Bears	1996
4		Videotron Centre	Quebec City	Quebec	20,396	18,259			QMJHL	Quebec Remparts	2015
5	Scotiabank Arena Toronto	Scotiabank Arena	Toronto	Ontario	19,800	18,819	19,800	NHL, NBA		Toronto Maple Leafs, Toronto Raptors	1999
6	GM Place	Rogers Arena	Vancouver	British Columbia	19,700	18,910	19,700	NHL, NLL		Vancouver Canucks, Vancouver Warriors	1995
7	Saddledome, Calgary	Scotiabank Saddledome	Calgary	Alberta	19,289	19,289	19,600	NHL, NLL, AHL	WHL	Calgary Flames, Calgary Hitmen, Calgary Roughnecks, Calgary Wranglers	1983
8	FirstOntario Centre - Hamilton	TD Coliseum	Hamilton	Ontario	18,000	16,534		AHL, PWHL, NLL		Hamilton Hammers, Hamilton Havoc, Toronto Rock	1985
9	2007 Memorial Cup towels	Pacific Coliseum	Vancouver	British Columbia	17,150	16,281		PWHL		Vancouver Goldeneyes	1967
10	Winnipeg Jets first home victory celebration	Canada Life Centre	Winnipeg	Manitoba	16,345	15,294		NHL, AHL, CEBL		Winnipeg Jets, Manitoba Moose, Winnipeg Sea Bears	2004
11	2023-04-07 Saskatoon Blades Playoff Game vs Regina Pats	SaskTel Centre	Saskatoon	Saskatchewan	15,195	15,195		CEBL, NLL	WHL	Saskatoon Blades, Saskatchewan Rattlers, Saskatchewan Rush	1988
12	HMCHockey	Scotiabank Centre	Halifax	Nova Scotia	11,593	10,595	11,593	NLL	QMJHL	Halifax Mooseheads, Halifax Thunderbirds	1978
13	Toronto Royal Horse Show	Coca-Cola Coliseum	Toronto	Ontario	10,279	7,851		AHL, PWHL		Toronto Marlies, Toronto Sceptres	1921
14	Budweiser Gardens - Interior	Canada Life Place	London	Ontario	10,200	9,100		BSL	OHL	London Lightning, London Knights	2002
15	Placebellcrunch	Place Bell	Laval	Quebec	10,000	10,000		AHL, PWHL		Laval Rocket, Montreal Victoire	2017
16	TD Place Arena	TD Place Arena	Ottawa	Ontario	9,500	9,500		CEBL, PWHL	OHL	Ottawa 67's, Ottawa Blackjacks, Ottawa Charge	1967
17	SOFMCFront	Save-On-Foods Memorial Centre	Victoria	British Columbia	9,000	7,006			WHL	Victoria Royals	2005
18		Avenir Centre	Moncton	New Brunswick	8,800	8,800			QMJHL	Moncton Wildcats	2018
19	Halifax NS Forum 2	Halifax Forum	Halifax	Nova Scotia	8,600	6,300	6,800			Dalhousie Tigers	1927
20		Rogers Forum	Abbotsford	British Columbia	8,500	7,000		AHL		Abbotsford Canucks	2009
21	WFCU Centre Interior	WFCU Centre	Windsor	Ontario	8,000	6,500	7,000	BSL	OHL	Windsor Express, Windsor Spitfires	2008
22	Prosperaplace	Prospera Place	Kelowna	British Columbia	8,000	5,507			WHL	Kelowna Rockets	1999
23		Peavey Mart Centrium	Red Deer	Alberta	7,819	6,000			WHL	Red Deer Rebels	1991
24	Kitchener Memorial Auditorium interior (1)	Kitchener Memorial Auditorium	Kitchener	Ontario	7,800	7,268	7,312	BSL	OHL	KW Titans, Kitchener Rangers	1950
25	General Motors Centre - Interior	Tribute Communities Centre	Oshawa	Ontario	7,300	5,180			OHL	Oshawa Generals	2006
26	Justrice complex 008	TD Station	Saint John	New Brunswick	7,205	6,308	6,603		QMJHL	Saint John Sea Dogs	1993
27	Moncton Coliseum Inside	Moncton Coliseum	Moncton	New Brunswick	7,200	6,554					1973
28	Brandt_Center_2016	Brandt Centre	Regina	Saskatchewan	7,129	6,200			WHL	Regina Pats	1977
29	EnMax Centre	Enmax Centre	Lethbridge	Alberta	7,100	5,479			WHL	Lethbridge Hurricanes	1974
30	AHL (12491532913)	Mary Brown's Centre	St. John's	Newfoundland and Labrador	7,000	6,247	6,750	BSL	QMJHL	Newfoundland Regiment; Newfoundland Rogues	2001
31	Cncentre	CN Centre	Prince George	British Columbia	7,000	5,971			WHL	Prince George Cougars	1995
32	Hershey Centre - Interior	Paramount Fine Foods Centre	Mississauga	Ontario	7,000	5,612	5,400	NBA G League		Raptors 905	1998
33		Canalta Centre	Medicine Hat	Alberta	7,000	5,500			WHL	Medicine Hat Tigers	2015
34	Paralympics 2010 - UBC Thunderbird Winter Sports Centre	Doug Mitchell Thunderbird Sports Centre	UBC Vancouver	British Columbia	7,000	5,004				UBC Thunderbirds	2008
35	K-Rock Centre	Slush Puppie Place	Kingston	Ontario	6,800	5,700			OHL	Kingston Frontenacs	2008
36	Centre 200	Centre 200	Sydney	Nova Scotia	6,500	5,000			QMJHL	Cape Breton Screaming Eagles	1987
37	Sleeman Centre	Sleeman Centre	Guelph	Ontario	6,500	4,715			OHL	Guelph Storm	2000
38	Essar Centre - Interior	GFL Memorial Gardens	Sault Ste. Marie	Ontario	6,497	4,928			OHL	Sault Ste. Marie Greyhounds	2006
39		South Okanagan Events Centre	Penticton	British Columbia	6,432	4,701			BCHL	Penticton Vees	2008
40	Meridian Centre - Exterior, St. Catherines Ontario	Meridian Centre	St. Catharines	Ontario	6,000	5,300		CEBL	OHL	Niagara River Lions, Niagara IceDogs	2014
41	Sandman Centre	Sandman Centre	Kamloops	British Columbia	6,000	5,464			WHL	Kamloops Blazers	1992
42	ProsperaCentre	Chilliwack Coliseum	Chilliwack	British Columbia	6,000	5,000			BCHL	Chilliwack Chiefs	2004
43		Western Financial Place	Cranbrook	British Columbia	6,000	4,654			BCHL	Cranbrook Bucks	2000
44	Credit Union Place entrance 2009	Consolidated Credit Union Place	Summerside	Prince Edward Island	6,000	4,228	4,532		MHL	Summerside Capitals	2007
45	Progressive Auto Sales Arena - Interior	Progressive Auto Sales Arena	Sarnia	Ontario	6,000	4,118			OHL	Sarnia Sting	1998
46		Kal Tire Place	Vernon	British Columbia	5,650	3,006			BCHL	Vernon Vipers	2001
47	University of Alberta Universiade Pavilion Butterdome Edmonton Alberta Canada 03A	Universiade Pavilion (Butterdome)	Edmonton	Alberta	5,500		5,500			University of Alberta Golden Bears	1983
48	Barrie Molson Centre	Sadlon Arena	Barrie	Ontario	5,500	4,195			OHL	Barrie Colts	1995
49	Lec-basketball-court	Langley Events Centre	Langley	British Columbia	5,276	5,276		CEBL	WHL	Vancouver Giants, Trinity Western Spartans, Fraser Valley Bandits	2009
50	Centre Bionest	Centre Bionest de Shawinigan	Shawinigan	Quebec	5,195	5,195			QMJHL	Shawinigan Cataractes	2008
51	KeystoneCentre2010	Westman Place at Keystone Centre	Brandon	Manitoba	5,102	5,102			WHL	Brandon Wheat Kings	1973
52	Sudbury community arena	Sudbury Community Arena	Sudbury	Ontario	5,100	4,640		BSL	OHL	Sudbury Five, Sudbury Wolves	1951
53		Ed Lumley Arena	Cornwall	Ontario	5,000	5,000			CCHL	Cornwall Colts	1976
54	Brampton vs Niagara 01	CAA Centre	Brampton	Ontario	5,000	5,000	5,000	CEBL	OHL	Brampton Honey Badgers, Brampton Steelheads	1998
55		Temple Gardens Centre	Moose Jaw	Saskatchewan	5,000	4,414			WHL	Moose Jaw Warriors	2011
56		Maurice Richard Arena	Montreal	Quebec	4,750	4,750					1962
57	Patinoire du Centre Georges-Vézina	Centre Georges-Vézina	Chicoutimi	Quebec	4,724	3,683			QMJHL	Chicoutimi Saguenéens	1949
58	Fort William Gardens TBay	Fort William Gardens	Thunder Bay	Ontario	4,680	4,680			SIJHL	Thunder Bay North Stars, Lakehead Thunderwolves	1951
59		Edmonton Expo Centre	Edmonton	Alberta	4,628		4,200	CEBL		Edmonton Stingers	1984
60		Ovintiv Events Centre	Dawson Creek	British Columbia	4,500	4,500					2008
61		Bonnetts Energy Centre	Grande Prairie	Alberta	4,500	3,228			AJHL	Grande Prairie Storm	1995
62		Cenovus Energy Hub	Lloydminster	Saskatchewan	4,500	2,500			AJHL	Lloydminster Bobcats	2025
63	Yardmen Arena inside	CAA Arena	Belleville	Ontario	4,400	4,400		AHL		Belleville Senators	1978
64		Colisée Vidéotron	Trois-Rivières	Quebec	4,390	4,390		ECHL		Trois-Rivières Lions	2021
65	Centre KC Irving 03	K.C. Irving Regional Centre	Bathurst	New Brunswick	4,400	3,162			QMJHL	Acadie-Bathurst Titan	1996
66	Peterborough Memorial Centre	Peterborough Memorial Centre	Peterborough	Ontario	4,329	3,729			OHL	Peterborough Petes	1956
67	J.D. McArthur Arena - Interior	J.D. McArthur Arena	Owen Sound	Ontario	4,300	3,500			OHL	Owen Sound Attack	1983
68	Aitken Centre	Aitken Centre	Fredericton	New Brunswick	4,258	3,685				UNB Varsity Reds	1976
69	Sun Life Financial Arena	Sun Life Financial Arena	Waterloo	Ontario	4,132	4,132			GOHL	Waterloo Siskins	1993
70	Varsity Arena	Varsity Arena	Toronto	Ontario	4,116	4,116				Varsity Blues	1926
71		Verdun Auditorium	Montreal	Quebec	4,114	3,795				Montreal Victoire	1939
72	Centre Slush Puppie	Slush Puppie Centre	Gatineau	Quebec	4,080	4,080			QMJHL	Gatineau Olympiques	2021
73		North Bay Memorial Gardens	North Bay	Ontario	4,043	4,043			OHL	North Bay Battalion	1955
74	Colisée Rimouski 2007	Colisée Financière Sun Life	Rimouski	Quebec	4,030	4,030			QMJHL	Rimouski Océanic	1966
75	PEI Rocket Game	Eastlink Centre	Charlottetown	Prince Edward Island	4,000	3,717	4,000		QMJHL	Charlottetown Islanders	1990
76	Centre Robert-Guertin	Robert Guertin Centre	Gatineau	Quebec	4,000	3,196					1952
77	Glacecmd	Centre Marcel Dionne	Drummondville	Quebec	4,000	3,038			QMJHL	Drummondville Voltigeurs	1963
78	Ray Twinney Complex	WinSport Arena (Markin-MacPhail Centre)	Calgary	Alberta	3,922	3,922		CEBL		Calgary Surge	2015
79		The Q Centre	Colwood	British Columbia	3,779	2,919			BCHL, VIJHL	Victoria Grizzlies, Westshore Wolves	2004
80		Ray Twinney Complex	Newmarket	Ontario	3,700	3,700					1985
81		Affinity Place	Estevan	Saskatchewan	3,660	2,700			SJHL	Estevan Bruins	2011
82		Palais des Sports	Sherbrooke	Quebec	3,646	3,646			QMJHL	Sherbrooke Phoenix	1965
83		Thompson Arena	London	Ontario	3,615	3,615				Western Ontario Mustangs	
84		Rath Eastlink Community Centre	Truro	Nova Scotia	3,600	3,100			MHL	Truro Bearcats	2013
85		Art Hauser Centre	Prince Albert	Saskatchewan	3,571	2,580			WHL	Prince Albert Raiders	1971
86	Centre Air Creebec	Centre Air Creebec	Val-d'Or	Quebec	3,504	2,140			QMJHL	Val-d'Or Foreurs	1949
87	Colisee de Laval (Nov 18 2007)	Colisée de Laval	Laval	Quebec	3,500	3,500		LNAH		Les Pétroliers du Nord	1954
88		Kahnawake Sports Complex	Kahnawake	Quebec	3,500	3,500			LHJQ	Kahnawake Condors	
89	Colisée Trois Rivières 01	Colisée de Trois-Rivières	Trois-Rivières	Quebec	3,500	2,800				UQTR Patriotes	1938
90		Memorial Civic Center	Campbellton	New Brunswick	3,500	3,500			MHL	Campbellton Tigers	1991
91	Zatzman Sportsplex Entrance	Zatzman Sportsplex	Halifax	Nova Scotia	3,500	3,000					1982
92		Aréna Iamgold	Rouyn-Noranda	Quebec	3,500	2,150			QMJHL	Rouyn-Noranda Huskies	1951
93		Earl Armstrong Arena	Ottawa	Ontario	3,500	2,300			CCHL	Gloucester Rangers	1971
94		Queen's Park Arena	New Westminster	British Columbia	3,500	3,500			WLA	New Westminster Salmonbellies	1930
95		Colisée Desjardins	Victoriaville	Quebec	3,420	3,420			QMJHL	Victoriaville Tigres	1980
96		Kingston Memorial Centre	Kingston	Ontario	3,300	3,300				Queen's Golden Gaels	1951
97		Centre d'Excellence Sports Rousseau	Boisbriand	Quebec	3,250	3,100			QMJHL	Blainville-Boisbriand Armada	2011
98		InnovationPlex	Swift Current	Saskatchewan	3,239	2,879			WHL	Swift Current Broncos	1967
99		Palais des Sports de Saguenay	Jonquière	Quebec	3,200	3,200		LNAH		Jonquière Marquis	1946
100		Pepsi Centre	Corner Brook	Newfoundland and Labrador	3,100	3,100					
101		Centre Henry-Leonard	Baie-Comeau	Quebec	3,042	2,779			QMJHL	Baie-Comeau Drakkar	1970
102	Colisée Cardin-1	Colisée Cardin	Sorel-Tracy	Quebec	3,037	3,037		LNAH		Sorel-Tracy Éperviers	1954
103	Centre Premier Tech	Centre Premier Tech	Rivière-du-Loup	Quebec	3,000	3,000		LNAH		Rivière-du-Loup 3L	2005
104		Investors Group Athletic Centre	Winnipeg	Manitoba	3,000		3,000			Manitoba Bisons	1999
105	FCAInt1	Frank Crane Arena	Nanaimo	British Columbia	3,000	3,000			BCHL	Nanaimo Clippers	
106		Steve Yzerman Arena	Ottawa	Ontario	3,000	3,000			CCHL	Nepean Raiders	1972
107	Max Bell Centre 2	Ken Bracko Arena (Max Bell Centre)	Calgary	Alberta	3,000	2,121			AJHL	Calgary Canucks	

== Historical arenas ==
- Arena Gardens/Mutual Street Arena – Toronto, Ontario
- Barton Street Arena – Hamilton, Ontario
- Cahill Stadium – Summerside, Prince Edward Island
- Chilliwack Coliseum – Chilliwack, British Columbia
- Colisée Pepsi – Quebec City, Quebec
- Dalhousie Memorial Arena – Halifax, Nova Scotia
- Dartmouth Arena – Dartmouth, Nova Scotia
- Denman Arena – Vancouver, British Columbia
- Dey's Arena – Ottawa, Ontario
- Edmonton Gardens – Edmonton, Alberta
- Hambly Arena – Oshawa, Ontario
- Aréna Jacques Plante - Shawinigan, Quebec
- Jack Gatecliff Arena - St. Catharines, Ontario
- Jubilee Arena – Montreal, Quebec
- Maple Leaf Gardens – Toronto, Ontario
- Medicine Hat Arena - Medicine Hat, Alberta
- Memorial Stadium – St. John's, Newfoundland and Labrador
- Montreal Arena – Montreal, Quebec
- Montreal Forum – Montreal, Quebec
- Mount Royal Arena – Montreal, Quebec
- Northlands Coliseum – Edmonton, Alberta
- Oshawa Civic Auditorium – Oshawa, Ontario
- Ottawa Auditorium – Ottawa, Ontario
- Patrick Arena – Victoria, British Columbia
- Quebec Arena – Quebec City, Quebec
- Quebec Skating Rink – Quebec City, Quebec
- Regina Exhibition Stadium – Regina, Saskatchewan
- Saskatoon Arena – Saskatoon, Saskatchewan
- Sault Memorial Gardens – Sault Ste. Marie, Ontario
- Shea's Amphitheatre – Winnipeg, Manitoba
- Stampede Corral - Calgary, Alberta
- Victoria Memorial Arena – Victoria, British Columbia
- Victoria Skating Rink – Montreal, Quebec
- Winnipeg Arena – Winnipeg, Manitoba

== Other arenas ==
- Olympic Oval – Calgary, Alberta
- Stephenville Dome – Stephenville, Newfoundland and Labrador

== See also ==
- List of stadiums in Canada
- List of indoor arenas by capacity
- Lists of stadiums
