= Moose Jaw Miller Express =

- Logo

Information
- League: Western Canadian Baseball League
- Location: Moose Jaw, Saskatchewan
- Ballpark: Ross Wells Ball Park
- League championships: 1999, 2002
- Colours: Yellow, Black, White
- President: Darryl Pisio
- General manager: Cory Olafson
- Manager: Richard Sorenson
- Website: www.millerexpress.ca

The Moose Jaw Miller Express are a collegiate summer baseball team based in Moose Jaw, Saskatchewan, Canada. They play in the Western Canadian Baseball League.

== History ==
The Moose Jaw Miller Express operate as a nonprofit organization, playing home games at Ross Wells Park.

The Miller Express broke their franchise-record number of wins in the 2026 WCBL season with 41, but fell short of a championship after losing in the league semi finals to the eventual champions, the Saskatoon Berries.

== Honours ==
- WCBL

Champions (2): 1999, 2002

== Notable Alumni ==
- Scott Richmond
- Eric Sim
