= Athletic Park (Medicine Hat) =

Stadium in Medicine Hat, Alberta, Canada

Coordinates: 50.044849°N 110.666206°W

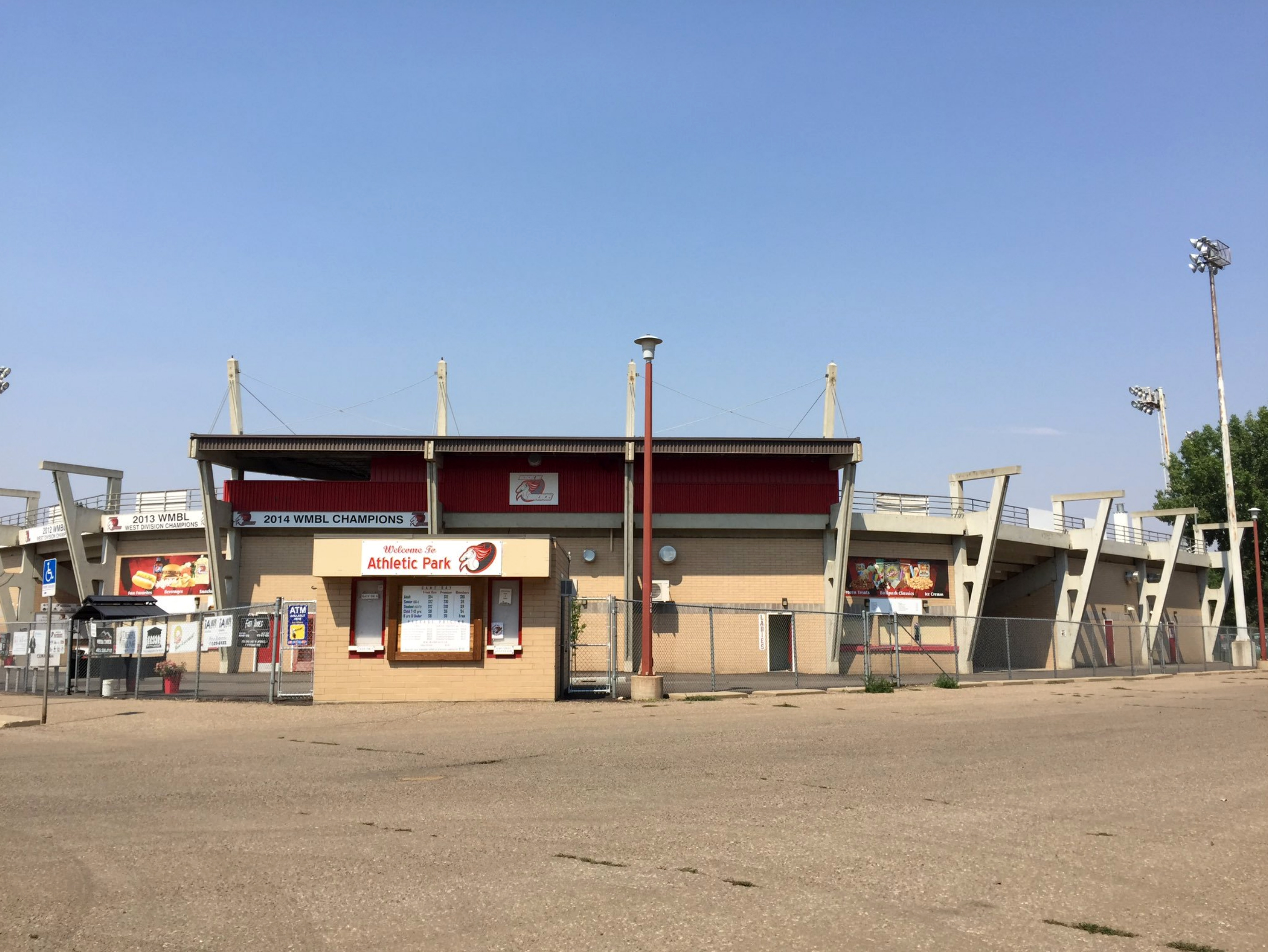
- Interactive map of Athletic Park
- Location: 1 Birch Avenue SE, Medicine Hat, Alberta
- Capacity: Baseball: 2200
- Surface: Natural Grass
- Field size: 350 left; 380 centre; 350 right

Construction
- Opened: 1978

Tenant
- Medicine Hat Mavericks (WCBL) (2003-Present)

Athletic Park is a stadium in Medicine Hat, Alberta, Canada. It is primarily used for baseball and was the home of the Medicine Hat Blue Jays of the Pioneer League and home to the Medicine Hat Mavericks of the Western Canadian Baseball League since 2002.

The ballpark has a capacity of 2200 people and was opened in 1978. Upgrades to the stadium and concessions were made in 2010.

After being damaged heavily twice due to two major Southern Alberta floods in 1995 and 2013, a berm was built around the ballpark outfield. There is a paved walking path beyond the outfield and on top of the berm where the field of play is in view during live games.
