= Brooks Bombers =

Canadian Baseball League team

- Logo

Information
- League: Western Canadian Baseball League
- Location: Brooks, Alberta
- Ballpark: Elks Field
- Founded: 2015
- Colours: Blue, Red, White
- General manager: Doug Jones
- Manager: TBD
- Website: brooksbombers.com

The Brooks Bombers are a Western Canadian Baseball League team based in Brooks, Alberta, Canada, that began play in May 2016. They currently play at Elks Field at the Quad Ball Diamond Complex.

== History ==
The team was first known as the Red Deer Generals of the Western Major Baseball League, and ceased operations in 2005. The franchise was then relocated in fall 2015 to Brooks.

The team's first coaching staff was unveiled in December 2015. Ehren Moreno was named the head coach. He was an assistant coach at Texas Southern University. Former Milwaukee Brewers player Kyle Dhanani was named an assistant coach. Tyler Seibert was named bench coach.

== Season-by-season record ==
League	Season	Manager	Regular season				Postseason			
League	Season	Manager	Won	Lost	Win %	Finish	Won	Lost	Win %	Result
WMBL
WMBL	2016	Ehren Moreno	15	33	.313	6th West	Did not qualify			
WMBL	2017	Calvin Ellis	14	34	.292	6th West	Did not qualify			
WMBL	2018	Kyle Mackinnon	13	35	.271	6th West	Did not qualify			
WCBL
WCBL	2019	Kyle Mackinnon	16	40	.286	6th West	Did not qualify			
WCBL	2022	Brice Davis	26	30	.464	4th West	0	2	.000	Lost West Division Semifinal
WCBL	2023	Blake Rowlett	17	39	.304	5th West	Did not qualify			
WCBL	2024	Dan Morgan	20	36	.357	4th West	0	2	.000	Lost West Division Semifinal
WCBL	2025	Dan Morgan	22	34	.393	4th West	0	2	.000	Lost West Division Semifinal
WCBL	2026	Justin Gomez	16	38	.296	5th West	Did not qualify			
WMBL Totals			42	102	.292	—	0	0	–	
WCBL Totals			117	217	.350	—	0	6	.000	
