= Chatham-Kent Barnstormers =

Independent minor league baseball team

Information
- League: Canadian Baseball League
- Location: Chatham, Ontario
- Ballpark: Fergie Jenkins Field
- Founded: 2024
- Colors: Black, red, gold
- Mascot: Lefty
- Ownership: Dom Dinelle, Matt Nahdee, Harry Muir, Scott Currie
- President: Dom Dinelle
- General manager: Harry Muir
- Manager: Dom Dinelle
- Website: https://www.ckbarnstormers.com

The Chatham-Kent Barnstormers are an independent minor league professional baseball team based in Chatham, Ontario, playing in the Canadian Baseball League (CBL). The team was founded in 2024 and play their home games at the 1,400 seat Fergie Jenkins Field.

The team played its first game in franchise history on May 18, 2024, a 5-3 win over the Kitchener Panthers.

== Roster ==
Chatham-Kent Barnstormers roster
Active roster	Coaching staff
Pitchers: 18 (Japan) Mizuki Akatsuka; 22 (Dominican Republic) Moises Brito; 99 (United States) Bo Buckley; 38 (Canada) Garret Day; 50 (Canada) Dylan Kints; 19 (Finland) Konsta Kurikka; 9 (France) Thibault Mercadier; 2 (Canada) Catalin Morin; 50 (Japan) Ryoya Oe; 20 (Canada) Dakota Parsons; 15 (Canada) Aden Ryan; 14 (Canada) Yuri Yokoyama; Utility players: 7 (Canada) Robert Mackie; Catchers: 45 (Japan) Mitsuki Fukuda; 8 (Japan) Yushin Ohta; Infielders: 27 (Canada) Owen Constantineau; 5 (Canada) Thomas Green; 23 (France) Julien Monks; 44 (Canada) Evan Morrison; Outfielders: 34 (United States) Greyson Barrett; 12 (Canada) Charles Bowman; 33 (Canada) Andy Groening; 10 (Canada) Austin Gurney; 17 (Canada) Kian Johnston; 13 (Canada) Lee Kucera; 25 (Canada) Spencer Morin	Manager: -- (Canada) Harry Muir (general manager); -- (Canada) Dom Dinelle (manager); Coaches: -- (Canada) Steve Charles (assistant); -- (Canada) Don Menard (assistant); Roster updated on June 13, 2026: Disabled list; ‡ Inactive list; § Suspended list

== History ==
On November 23, 2022, the Intercounty Baseball League announced that it had approved an expansion application for Chatham Ontario for admittance into the league starting with the 2024 IBL season. The team's name was initially unveiled as the "Chatham-Kent Blackbirds" on January 27, 2023, but was dropped only three days later after team officials learned the term held historical derogatory use. The team later stated that they would change the name to “better reflect the diverse cultural history of the community.” On July 6, 2023, the new team name was officially unveiled as the "Chatham-Kent Barnstormers" (a reference to Barnstorming).

After operating for two years and an semi-pro club, the team transitioned to fully professional in 2026 after the IBL rebranded to the Canadian Baseball League, becoming the city's first pro sports team since the Chatham Wheels of the Colonial Hockey League left in 1994. Harry Muir, the team's general manager, told reporters the changes would not lead to an increase in ticket prices.

== Season-by-season results ==
Season	Wins	Losses	Win%	Finish	Postseason
2024	20	22	.476	5th	Lost 3-0 in Quarter-finals to Guelph Royals
2025	22	20	.524	4th	Lost 3-1 in Quarter-finals to Hamilton Cardinals
2026	14	33	.298	9th	Did not qualify
Total	56	75	.427		2 Playoff Appearance, 0 Championships.

== Managers ==
- Dan Norman 2024
- Gilberto Rondón 2025
- Harry Muir 2025 (interim)
