= SMS Equipment Place =

Sports complex in Fort McMurray, Alberta

Coordinates: 56°44′09″N 111°23′04″W

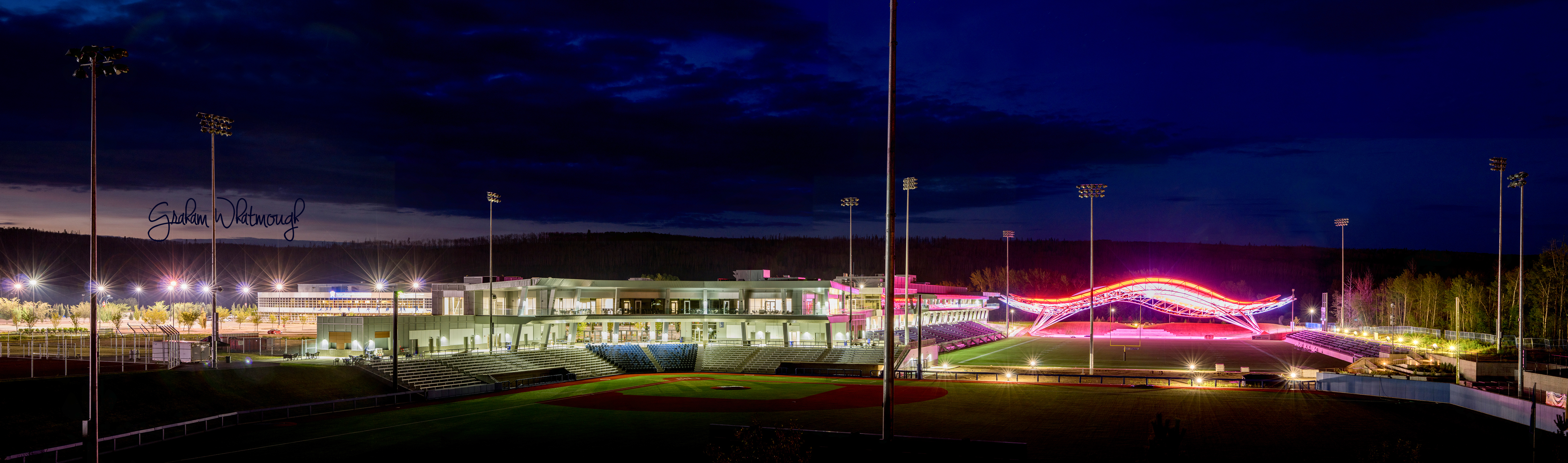
SMS Equipment Place in Fort McMurray

SMS Equipment Place (formerly Shell Place) is a sports, recreation and mixed use complex in Fort McMurray, Alberta, which includes SMS Equipment Stadium, a multi-purpose stadium and performance venue, Legacy Dodge Field, a softball and baseball tournament facility, as well as a field house, badminton centre, non-profit and meeting spaces, and recreation trail.

SMS Equipment Place was built as a $127 million addition to the preexisting MacDonald Island Park. SMS Equipment Stadium has close to 5,000 fixed seats.

The stadium hosted "Northern Kickoff", a June 13, 2015 season-opening exhibition game between the Canadian Football League teams Edmonton Eskimos and the Saskatchewan Roughriders, the first major sporting event held at the new facility as well as the most northerly outdoor professional football game in history. In a last-minute addition to the 2015 CFL schedule, the Toronto Argonauts hosted a regular season home game against the Eskimos at Shell Place on June 27 of the same year.

The North American Soccer League's FC Edmonton played two regular season games at Shell Place during the 2015 NASL season. On July 5, the host Eddies faced the San Antonio Scorpions for the Wood Buffalo Cup, named for the Regional Municipality of Wood Buffalo. On August 2, FC Edmonton played Canadian rivals Ottawa Fury FC.

Due to the 2016 Fort McMurray Wildfire, the Fort McMurray Giants played their inaugural home games in Edmonton, and returned to Shell Place on June 29.
