= Regina Red Sox =

- Logo

Information
- League: Western Canadian Baseball League
- Location: Regina, Saskatchewan
- Ballpark: Currie Field
- League championships: 2011, 2012, 2025
- Colours: Red, Navy, White
- Ownership: Brandt Sports & Entertainment
- CEO: Gordon Pritchard
- General manager: Mitch MacDonald
- Manager: Rye Pothakos
- Website: www.reginaredsox.com

The Regina Red Sox are a collegiate summer baseball team based in Regina, Saskatchewan, Canada. They play in the Western Canadian Baseball League. The Red Sox have won the WMBL title three times, once in 2011 and once in 2012 as well as most recently in 2025 . The Red Sox also won the SMBL (Saskatchewan Major Baseball League) championship in 1976 and 1977, and the SBL (Southern Baseball League) in 1942, 1953, 1955, 1960, 1964, and 1969.

== History ==
The current iteration of the Regina Red Sox took name inspiration from previous Regina-based baseball teams that played from the 1940s up until the 1970s.

Despite a successful history with the name, the team had a difficult debut season in what is now the Western Canadian Baseball League, posting a 7-39 record in the 2005 season. The team improved to 21-15 in 2006. The performance was good enough to win the East Division title before losing to Swift Current in a semi-final series.

The team won its first modern-era Western Major Baseball League championship in 2011, then a second in 2012.

The team would capture its third league championship in 2025.

Following the 2025 season, full ownership of the team was taken over by Queen City Sports & Entertainment Group, owned by Shaun Semple under the Brandt Group of Companies as announced on June 13, 2025. The Red Sox are the second team purchased by Semple and Brandt after acquiring the Regina Pats in 2021.

Gary Brotzel announced his retirement on Sept. 24, 2026 after working as the Red Sox general manager and president since the team's revival in 2005. Mitch MacDonald will take over as general manager for the 2027 WCBL season. Gordon Pritchard has been named CEO of the Red Sox under ownership by the group now known as Brandt Sports & Entertainment.

== Honours ==
- WCBL

Champions (3): 2011, 2012, 2025

== Ballpark ==
The team plays at Currie Field in Regina. In 2021, the Red Sox announced concept plans for a new 3,500 seat baseball park. In 2024, the Regina city council approved a case for support study, and is seeking a commitment of at least $5 million from the Red Sox before considering spending public funds on the stadium project. In 2025, new team owner Shawn Semple proposed that the new ballpark be built as a private-public partnership. Under this proposal, the stadium would be privately owned once built.
