= Fort McMurray Giants =

Collegiate summer baseball team based in Fort McMurray, Alberta, Canada

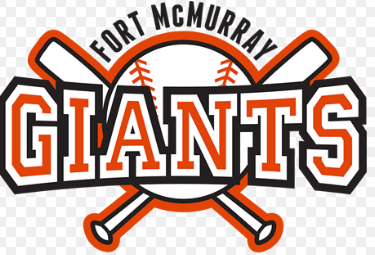
- Logo

Information
- League: Western Canadian Baseball League
- Location: Fort McMurray, Alberta
- Ballpark: Legacy Dodge Field
- Founded: 2016
- Colours: Orange, Black, White
- Website: fortmcmurraygiants.ca

The Fort McMurray Giants are a collegiate summer baseball team based in Fort McMurray operating out of Legacy Dodge Field in Fort McMurray, Alberta, Canada. They play in the Western Canadian Baseball League. The team was formed in 2016 as an expansion team and began playing at the Edmonton Ballpark at the beginning of their inaugural season, due to the wildfire and evacuation of their hometown.

== Season-by-season record ==
League	Season	Manager	Regular season				Postseason			
League	Season	Manager	Won	Lost	Win %	Finish	Won	Lost	Win %	Result
WMBL
WMBL	2016	Mike Riley	16	32	.333	5th West	Did not qualify			
WMBL	2017	Michael Gahan	20	28	.417	5th West	Did not qualify			
WMBL	2018	Michael Gahan	17	31	.354	5th West	Did not qualify			
WCBL
WCBL	2019	Ray Brown	28	28	.500	5th West	Did not qualify			
WCBL	2022	Ray Brown	27	29	.482	3rd West	0	2	.000	Lost West Division Semifinal
WCBL	2023	Joe Ellison	30	26	.536	4th West	0	2	.000	Lost West Division Semifinal
WCBL	2024	Joe Ellison	20	36	.357	5th West	Did not qualify			
WCBL	2025	Joe Ellison	20	35	.364	5th West	Did not qualify			
WCBL	2026	Dylan Cooper	15	41	.268	6th West	Did not qualify			
WMBL Totals			53	91	.368	—	0	0	–	
WCBL Totals			140	195	.418	—	0	4	.000	
