= Lethbridge Bulls =

- Founded: 1999
- League: Western Canadian Baseball League
- Division: West Division
- Based in: Lethbridge
- Ballpark: Spitz Stadium
- Head coach: Chance Wheatley
- League titles: 2015, 2021
- Mascot: T-Bone

The Lethbridge Bulls are a Summer college baseball team playing at Spitz Stadium in Lethbridge, Alberta. The team is a member of the Western Canadian Baseball League, a collegiate summer baseball league operating in the prairie provinces of Canada.

== History ==
The team was founded in 1999 by Doug Jones, mayor of the town of Oyen. Kevin Kvame has been the President and General Manager of the Bulls since 2005 and was the GM for the 3 preceding years as well. Kregg Snook became the current head coach in 2019. He was the team’s pitcher in 2014 and 2016. The club played out of Henderson Stadium following the relocation of the Pioneer League franchise Lethbridge Mounties and Lethbridge Black Diamonds to Missoula in the fall of 1998 becoming the Missoula Osprey and then the Missoula PaddleHeads.

== Honours ==
- WCBL

Champions (2): 2015, 2021

== Current ==
The Bulls have won the Western Division title on 4 occasions and the League Championship twice, in 2015 and in the 2021 shortened season due to COVID-19. They have been 1st overall in the regular season of the WMBL on 3 occasions.

== 2011 Highway Shooting ==
In 2011, two players from the Lethbridge Bulls (20-year old Mitch Maclean and 22-year-old Tanner Craswell) from Prince Edward Island lost their lives due to a triple murder-suicide along the Alberta Highway 2 near Claresholm Alberta. It has since been referred to as the “Claresholm highway shooting”.

== See also ==
- List of baseball teams in Canada
