= Western Canadian Baseball League =

Collegiate summer baseball league in Canada

- Current season, competition or edition: 2026 WCBL season
- Sport: Baseball
- Founded: 1975
- No. of teams: 12
- Country: Canada
- Headquarters: Lethbridge, Alberta
- Most recent champion: Saskatoon Berries (1st title)
- Most titles: Okotoks Dawgs (8 titles)
- Website: westerncanadianbaseballleague.ca

The Western Canadian Baseball League (WCBL) is a collegiate summer baseball league. The league is home to teams based in the Canadian Prairie provinces of Saskatchewan and Alberta, and has roots dating back to 1931 in Saskatchewan's Southern Baseball League. In 1975, the province's southern and northern leagues merged, creating the foundation for the WCBL. Today, the league boasts seven teams in Alberta and five in Saskatchewan.

== History ==
Logo of the Western Major Baseball League.

The league can trace its roots back to 1931, via its predecessors, the Southern Baseball League (1931 to 1974) and the Northern Saskatchewan Baseball League (1959 to 1974). The Saskatchewan Major Baseball League (SMBL) was formed in 1975 through a merger of the Southern and Northern leagues. Three teams from each former league entered the new loop—the Eston Ramblers, Saskatoon Royals, and Unity Cardinals from the north, and the Moose Jaw Devons, Regina Red Sox, and Swift Current Indians from the south.

The league was renamed the Western Major Baseball League in 2000 to reflect teams based in Alberta, along with the possibility of future expansion to British Columbia. In June 2018, it was announced that the league would be renamed the Western Canadian Baseball League.

The 2020 season was cancelled due to the COVID-19 pandemic. Due to COVID-19 restrictions and logistics, the 2021 season was played with only five Alberta-based teams and Canadian players only.

== Teams ==
As of 2025, WCBL membership consists of 12 teams in two divisions. The West Division is made up of six Albertan teams, while the East Division is made up of all five teams from Saskatchewan, plus the easternmost Albertan team from Medicine Hat. The top four teams in each division qualify for the post-season.

=== Current teams ===
The Energy City Cactus Rats will not play in the 2027 season; the WCBL issued a one-year suspension due to ongoing delays with the construction of Energy City Metro Ballpark.

Division	Team	City	Stadium	Founded	Seating capacity	2026 record	Finish
West	Brooks Bombers	Brooks, Alberta	Elks Stadium	2015	681	16–38	5th
West	Energy City Cactus Rats	Spruce Grove, Alberta	Energy City Metro Ballpark	2005	0 (Note: Ballpark is still under construction; the Cactus Rats played the 2026 season without spectators.)	21–33	4th
West	Fort McMurray Giants	Fort McMurray, Alberta	Legacy Dodge Field	2016	1,725	15–41	6th
West	Lethbridge Bulls	Lethbridge, Alberta	Spitz Stadium	1999	3,000	33–23	3rd
West	Okotoks Dawgs	Okotoks, Alberta	Seaman Stadium	2003	2,500	42–14	1st
West	Sylvan Lake Gulls	Sylvan Lake, Alberta	Pogadl Park	2021	1,384	38–18	2nd
East	Medicine Hat Mavericks	Medicine Hat, Alberta	Athletic Park	2003	2,200	22–34	4th
East	Moose Jaw Miller Express	Moose Jaw, Saskatchewan	Ross Wells Ball Park	2002	750	41–15	1st
East	Regina Red Sox	Regina, Saskatchewan	Currie Field	1946	2,000	26–30	3rd
East	Saskatoon Berries	Saskatoon, Saskatchewan	Cairns Field	2023	2,200	38–18	2nd
East	Swift Current 57's	Swift Current, Saskatchewan	Mitchell Field	1959	550	21–35	5th
East	Weyburn Beavers	Weyburn, Saskatchewan	Tom Laing Park	—	600	21–35	6th

=== Former teams ===
Team	City	Final year
Eston Ramblers	Eston, Saskatchewan	1993
Hazlet Elks	Hazlet, Saskatchewan	1993
Kindersley Royals	Kindersley, Saskatchewan	
Melville Millionaires	Melville, Saskatchewan	2019
Moose Jaw Devons	Moose Jaw, Saskatchewan	
Oyen Pronghorns	Oyen, Alberta	1997
Red Deer Generals	Red Deer, Alberta	2005
Saskatoon Liners	Saskatoon, Saskatchewan	1984
Saskatoon Nationals	Saskatoon, Saskatchewan	
Saskatoon Yellow Jackets	Saskatoon, Saskatchewan	2014
Sherwood Park Dukes	Sherwood Park, Alberta	2008
Unity Cardinals	Unity, Saskatchewan	
Yorkton Cardinals	Yorkton, Saskatchewan	2019

=== Expansion ===
Cranbrook, British Columbia, was granted an expansion team, the Eds, in 2011 conditional on building a new stadium. However, the plans failed to come to fruition.

The two most recent additions to the league are in Sylvan Lake and Saskatoon. Plans for a 2021 launch of the Sylvan Lake team were announced November 1, 2019. Branding as the Sylvan Lake Gulls was announced in March 2020. Saskatoon was awarded the most recent expansion team, in 2023. In July 2023, the team unveiled that it would be called the Saskatoon Berries.

== Harry Hallis Memorial Trophy ==
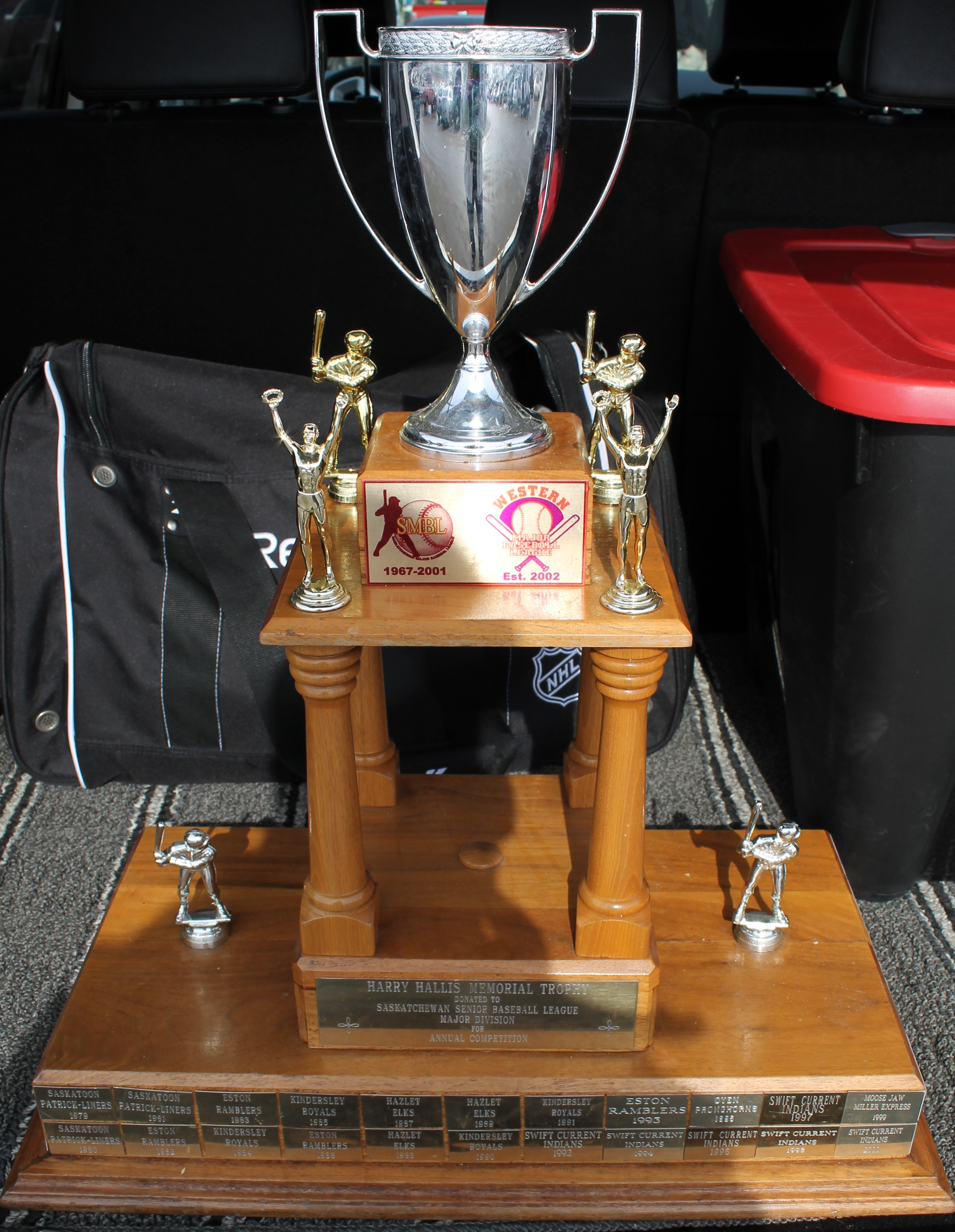
Harry Hallis Memorial Trophy.

Saskatchewan Territorial (1895–1905) and Provincial (1906–present) champions have been decided by an annual tournament. In 1967 the first major division was added to the tournament, and the award was named in memory of Harry Hallis. From 1967 until 1974 the name of this provincial champion was added to the trophy. In 1975, when the Saskatchewan Major Baseball League was formed, this trophy continued to be awarded to the SMBL champions, and now the WCBL champions.

== League champions ==
Saskatchewan Major Baseball League (SMBL) Champions:

- 1975: Eston Ramblers
- 1976: Regina Red Sox
- 1977: Regina Red Sox
- 1978: Eston Ramblers
- 1979: Saskatoon Patrick-Liners
- 1980: Saskatoon Patrick-Liners
- 1981: Saskatoon Patrick-Liners
- 1982: Eston Ramblers
- 1983: Eston Ramblers
- 1984: Kindersley Royals
- 1985: Kindersley Royals
- 1986: Eston Ramblers
- 1987: Hazlet Elks
- 1988: Hazlet Elks
- 1989: Hazlet Elks
- 1990: Kindersley Royals
- 1991: Kindersley Royals
- 1992: Swift Current Indians
- 1993: Eston Ramblers
- 1994: Swift Current Indians
- 1995: Oyen Pronghorns
- 1996: Swift Current Indians
- 1997: Swift Current Indians
- 1998: Swift Current Indians
- 1999: Moose Jaw Miller Express
- 2000: Swift Current Indians

Western Major Baseball League (WMBL) Champions: (Harry Hallis Memorial Trophy)

- 2001: Swift Current Indians
- 2002: Moose Jaw Miller Express/Melville Millionaires
- 2003: Medicine Hat Mavericks
- 2004: Calgary Dawgs
- 2005: Swift Current Indians
- 2006: Swift Current Indians
- 2007: Okotoks Dawgs
- 2008: Okotoks Dawgs
- 2009: Okotoks Dawgs
- 2010: Swift Current Indians
- 2011: Regina Red Sox
- 2012: Regina Red Sox
- 2013: Melville Millionaires
- 2014: Medicine Hat Mavericks
- 2015: Lethbridge Bulls
- 2016: Swift Current Indians
- 2017: Swift Current 57's
- 2018: Medicine Hat Mavericks

Western Canadian Baseball League (WCBL) Champions: (Harry Hallis Memorial Trophy)

- 2019: Okotoks Dawgs
- 2020: Season cancelled due to COVID-19 pandemic.
- 2021: Lethbridge Bulls (Note: Shortened season. Some teams did not compete.)
- 2022: Okotoks Dawgs
- 2023: Okotoks Dawgs
- 2024: Okotoks Dawgs
- 2025: Regina Red Sox
- 2026: Saskatoon Berries

Championships (WCBL/WMBL)
Team	Wins	Seasons
Okotoks Dawgs	8	2004, 2007, 2008, 2009, 2019, 2022, 2023, 2024
Swift Current 57's	6	2001, 2005, 2006, 2010, 2016, 2017
Medicine Hat Mavericks	3	2003, 2014, 2018
Regina Red Sox	3	2011, 2012, 2025
Lethbridge Bulls	2	2015, 2021
Melville Millionaires	2	2002, 2013
Moose Jaw Miller Express	1	2002
Saskatoon Berries	1	2026
