= Seaman Stadium =

Stadium in Okotoks, Alberta, Canada

Coordinates: 50.7189536°N 113.9475346°W

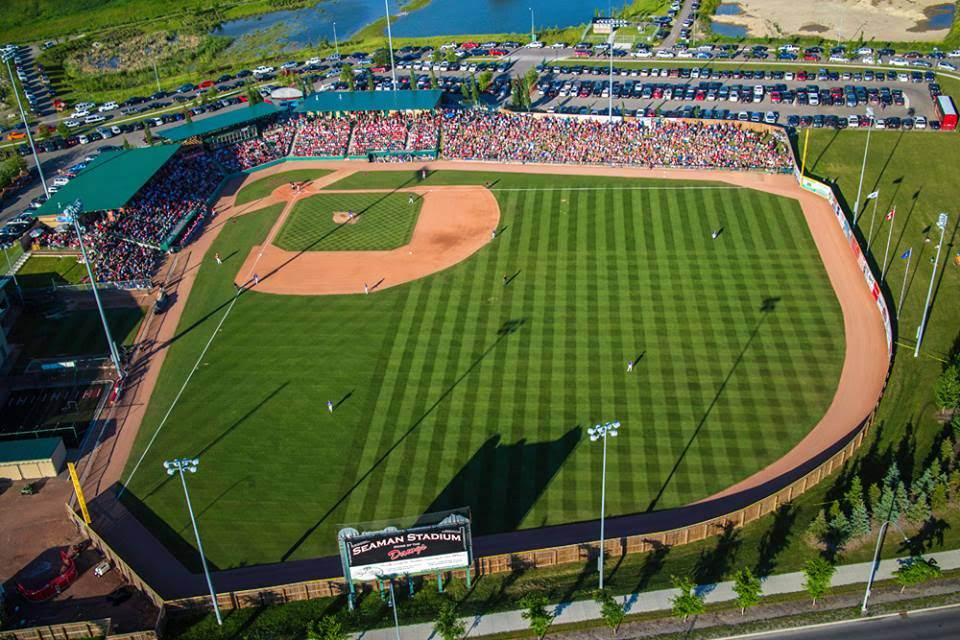
- Interactive map of Seaman Stadium
- Location: Okotoks, Alberta, Canada
- Capacity: 2,500 seats 5,200 total: Left field – 330 feet; Center field – 400 feet; Right field – 325 feet

Seaman Stadium is a stadium in Okotoks, Alberta, Canada, which is primarily used for baseball as the home field of the Okotoks Dawgs collegiate summer baseball team in the Western Canadian Baseball League. The ballpark has a capacity for 5,200 with a mix of stadium seating around the infield, and a grass berm stretching the left field line. The stadium features fan amenities typical of minor league stadiums such as concessions, a team store, a concourse which overlooks the playing field, as well as party decks & hospitality areas, and a high-definition video scoreboard, which was installed as an upgrade from the original screen in 2016.

Seaman Stadium opened on June 6, 2007, becoming the home of the Dawgs, after the club used Foothills Stadium in Calgary from 2003 to 2005. It is named after the ballpark's principal donors, Donald Seaman and Doc Seaman. The Dawgs clinched the Western Major Baseball League Championship in 2007 and 2008 in front of sellout crowds at Seaman Stadium in both years. The Dawgs are annually among the leaders in per-game attendance in summer collegiate baseball across North America, with the franchise record of 4,558 fans per game occurring in 2023. The dimensions (in feet) are: 330 in left field, 325 in right field, and 400 in center field. Seaman Stadium was built at a cost of $16 million. Ballpark Digest named Seaman Stadium the "Best Ballpark in Summer Collegiate Baseball" in 2023.

Construction of Duvernay Fieldhouse, located off the right field line of Seaman Stadium, was completed in 2009. It is a full service indoor training facility for the Dawgs WCBL team as well as Dawgs Youth Academy players.

== Film Industry ==
The scene of the baseball game, which is brought to a premature end by one of the increasingly frequent dust storms threatening Earth in the movie Interstellar was filmed at Seaman Stadium and nearby Tourmaline Field, with actors Matthew McConaughey, John Lithgow, and Timothée Chalamet.

Preceded by Foothills Stadium	Home of the Okotoks Dawgs; 2007 – present	Succeeded by incumbent
