= Swift Current 57's =

- Logo

Information
- League: Western Canadian Baseball League (East Division)
- Location: Swift Current, SK
- Ballpark: Mitchell Field
- Founded: 1950; 76 years ago
- Nickname: "the Tribe"
- League championships: 2001, 2005, 2006, 2010, 2016, 2017

The Swift Current 57's (formerly the Swift Current Indians) are a baseball team based in Swift Current, Saskatchewan, Canada. The team is a member of the Western Canadian Baseball League (WCBL), a collegiate summer baseball league operating in the prairie provinces of Canada.

== History ==
Organized baseball has been played in Swift Current since at least 1908 as the city was represented in the Western Saskatchewan League that season. The 1909 Swift Current baseball team was crowned Amateur Champions of Saskatchewan and toured North Dakota, Minnesota and Iowa. In 1959 the Swift Current Indians joined the Southern Baseball League and also won their first league championship. The Indians captured four Southern Baseball League championships and were one of the six founding members of the Saskatchewan Major Baseball League (SMBL) in 1975. This new league was effectively a merger of the Southern Baseball League and the Northern Saskatchewan Baseball League. The team however only played one year before requesting a leave of absence from the league in 1976.

The team returned to the league in c.1986 and went on to win six SMBL championships during the 1990s. In 2001 the league was renamed the Western Major Baseball League to reflect its expansion into Alberta and later renamed the WCBL ahead of the 2019 season. The team has won six championships since the 2001 name change, most recently in 2017.

In a website press release dated September 1, 2016, the team officially notified the Western Major Baseball League of its intent to change the name and branding to a yet-to-be-determined name and logo. Long time Swift Current player and coach Harv Martinez explained that the new name would reflect the evolving focus and standards of the organization as community leaders, stating: "The tradition and passion for baseball in this region will still be strong and vibrant. The new direction in creating a new nickname allows for us re-brand our product and promote the team in a more current and sensitive manner.”

On January 10, 2017, the Swift Current baseball club officially re-branded as the 57's. The new brand was chosen to honour 57 years of Swift Current baseball history while moving away from its original Indigenous-themed moniker, aligning with a broader trend in sports of retiring such names.

== Honours ==
- WCBL

Champions (6): 2001, 2005, 2006, 2010, 2016, 2017

== See also ==
- List of baseball teams in Canada
