= Okotoks Dawgs =

Canadian collegiate summer baseball team

- Logo

Information
- League: Western Canadian Baseball League
- Location: Okotoks, Alberta, Canada
- Ballpark: Seaman Stadium (2007–present)
- Founded: 2003
- League championships: 8 (2004, 2007, 2008, 2009, 2019, 2022, 2023, 2024)
- Former name: Calgary Dawgs (2003–2005)
- Former ballpark: Foothills Stadium
- Manager: Mitch Schmidt, Lou Pote
- Website: https://dawgsbaseball.ca

The Okotoks Dawgs are a collegiate summer baseball team based in Okotoks, Alberta, Canada. They play in the Western Canadian Baseball League (WCBL). The Dawgs are eight-time WCBL champions.

== History ==
The Dawgs were originally based in Calgary where they were known as the Calgary Dawgs. The roots of the team date to 1996 (as shown in the team's logo) "with the formation of an elite youth travel team". The Dawgs joined the WCBL in 2003, playing at Foothills Stadium. They won the 2004 league championship in front of over 3,400 fans. The arrival of the professional Calgary Vipers in 2005 led to numerous bitter conflicts between the two clubs over use of the stadium, and ultimately forced the Dawgs to suspend operations for the 2006 season.

The franchise resumed operations in 2007 in the town of Okotoks, 18 kilometres south of Calgary, after brothers Don and Doc Seaman funded the construction of Seaman Stadium and Duvernay Fieldhouse at the cost of $20 million. The Dawgs have since added Tourmaline Field and Conrad Field thanks to further donations from the private sector, principally Michael Rose.

The team has been a huge success in Okotoks. Their average of 1,825 fans per game in 2008 was the most of any baseball team in Alberta and made them the top drawing collegiate team in Canada. Attendance steadily increased to an estimated 2,400 per game by 2011, which team director John Ircandia attributed to the community's enthusiastic support, noting that games "kind of became a place to see your neighbours again." In 2019, the team attracted an average of 3,937 fans per game, the third-highest in all of Summer Collegiate baseball. In 2024 the club increased their attendance to 4,200 fans per game.

The organization operates several high performance teams at the under-18, under-15, and under -13 levels. The Dawgs premier 18U team has been ranked the 3rd top travel team in North America by perfect game. Since their arrival in Okotoks, the community has seen a significant increase in participation in minor baseball, growing from 150 registered players in 2006 to over 500 in 2011.

The Dawgs have been equally successful on the field since their move to Okotoks, capturing the 2007, 2008, 2009, 2019, 2022, 2023, 2024 championships.

== Honours ==
- WCBL

Champions (8): 2004, 2007, 2008, 2009, 2019, 2022, 2023, 2024

== Alumni ==
- Jim Henderson
- Andrew Kittredge
- Alejo Lopez
- Kody Funderburk

== See also ==
- List of baseball teams in Canada
