= Sport in Saskatchewan =

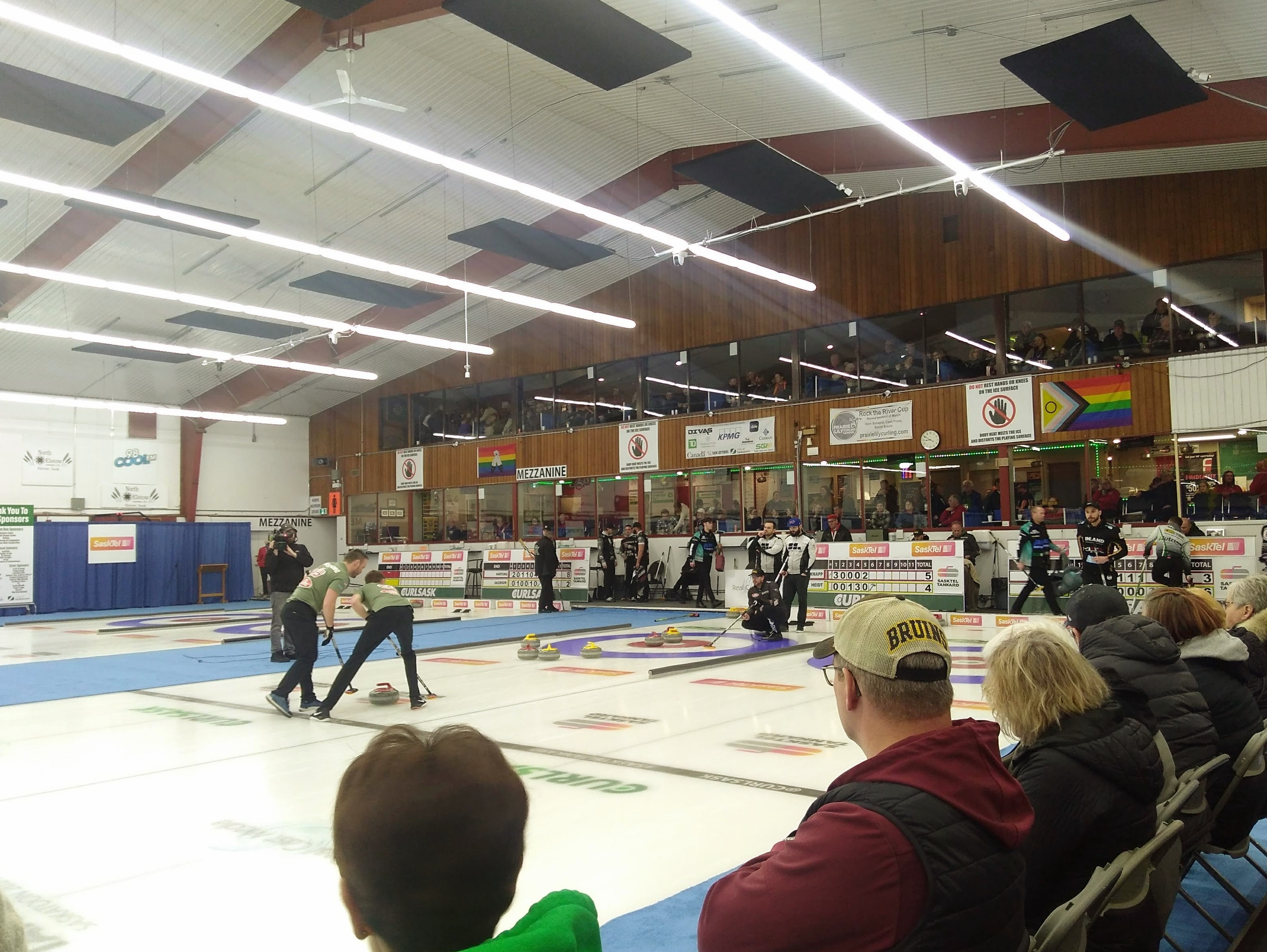
The 2024 SaskTel Tankard in Saskatoon.

Sports in Saskatchewan consist of a wide variety of team and individual games, and include summer, winter, indoor, and outdoor games. Saskatchewan's cold winter climate has ensured the popularity of sports including its official sport, curling, as well as ice hockey, ice skating, and cross-country skiing. The province also has warm summers and popular summer sports include baseball, football, soccer, basketball, track and field, rodeo, horse-racing, and golf.

Saskatchewan is home to three professional sports teams, including the Saskatchewan Roughriders of the Canadian Football League, one of the oldest sports teams in North America. The province is also home to many junior teams, especially in hockey. University athletes at the University of Saskatchewan and the University of Regina compete in U Sports. Saskatchewan has hosted many major national and international sports events, especially in hockey and curling.

The province has produced notable athletes in many sports, especially in hockey and curling, along with many Olympians, including gold and multi-medalists like Ethel Catherwood, Catriona Le May Doan, and Mark McMorris.

== Sports teams ==
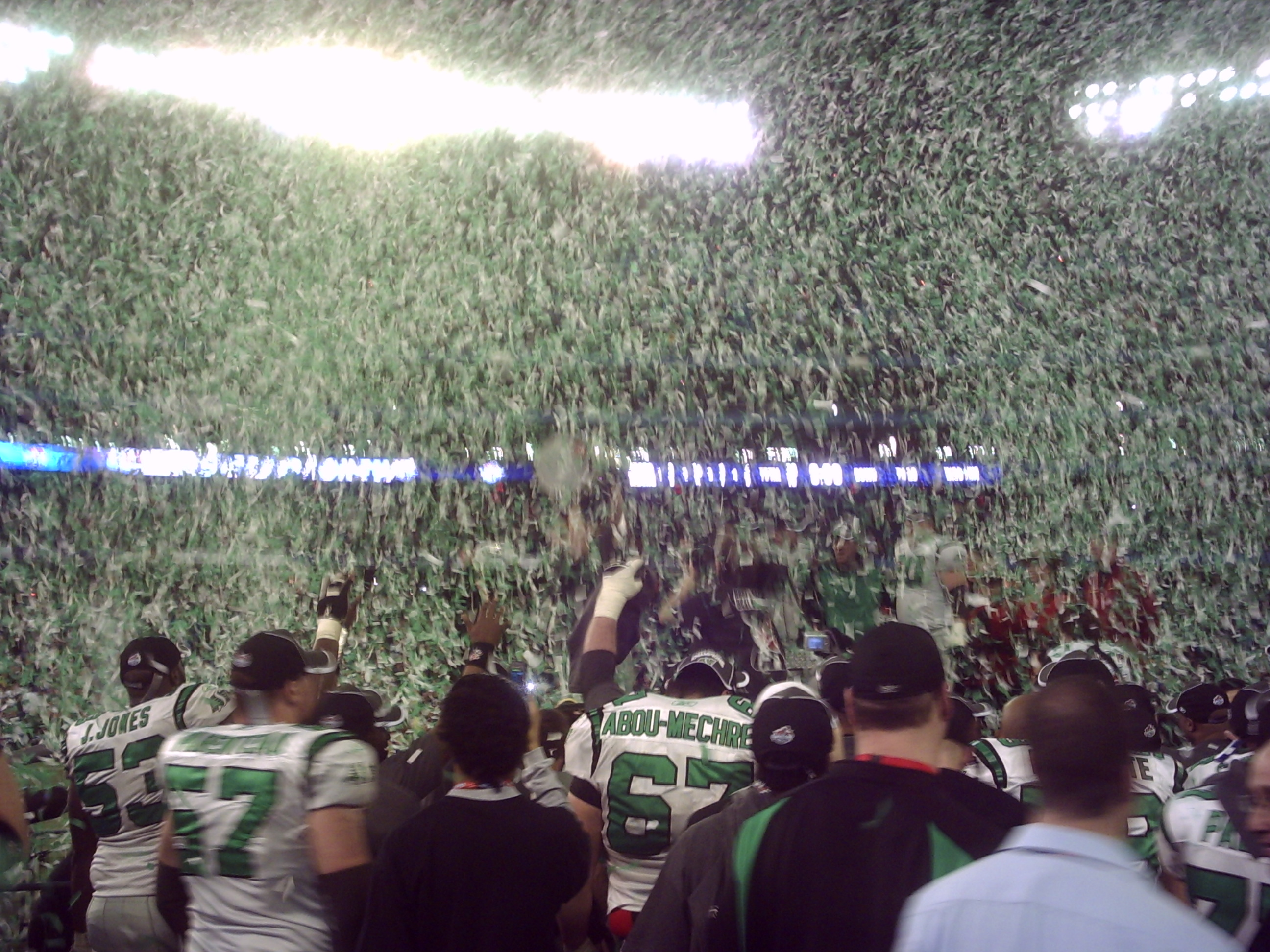
The Saskatchewan Roughriders celebrate their 2007 Grey Cup victory

=== Major leagues ===
Club	Sport	League	Venue	Capacity	Since	City	Championships
Saskatchewan Roughriders	Canadian football	CFL	Mosaic Stadium	33,350	1910	Regina	5 (1966, 1989, 2007, 2013, 2025)
Saskatchewan Rush	Box Lacrosse	NLL	SaskTel Centre	15,195	2016	Saskatoon	2 (2016, 2018)
Saskatoon Mamba	Basketball	CEBL	SaskTel Centre	15,195	2019	Saskatoon	1 (2019)

=== Amateur ===
Club	Sport	League	Venue	Capacity	Since	City	Championships
Saskatoon Valkyries	Football	WWCFL	Gordie Howe Bowl	5,000	2011	Saskatoon	10 (2011, 2012, 2013, 2014, 2016, 2019, 2022, 2023, 2024, 2025)
Regina Riot	Football	WWCFL	Leibel Field	1,200	2011	Regina	3 (2015, 2017, 2018)
Saskatoon Berries & Regina Redsox, Moose Jaw Millers, Swift current 57s	Baseball	WCBL	Cairns Field	2,000	2023	Saskatoon	1 (2026) Saskatoon

=== Major junior ===
Club	Sport	League	Venue	Capacity	Since	City	National championships
Regina Pats	Ice hockey	WHL	Brandt Centre	6,000	1917	Regina	4 (1925, 1928, 1930, 1974)
Saskatoon Blades	Ice hockey	WHL	SaskTel Centre	15,195	1966	Saskatoon	0
Swift Current Broncos	Ice hockey	WHL	Innovation Credit Union iPlex	2,879	1967	Swift Current	1 (1989)
Prince Albert Raiders	Ice hockey	WHL	Art Hauser Centre	2,580	1982	Prince Albert	1 (1985)
Moose Jaw Warriors	Ice hockey	WHL	Mosaic Place	4,500	1984	Moose Jaw	0
Saskatoon Hilltops	Football	CJFL	Gordie Howe Bowl	5,000	1947	Saskatoon	22 (1953, 1958, 1959, 1968, 1969, 1978, 1985, 1991, 1996, 2001, 2002, 2003, 2007, 2010, 2011, 2012, 2014, 2015, 2016, 2017, 2018, 2019)
Regina Thunder	Football	CJFL	Leibel Field	1,200	1999	Regina	1 (2013)

=== University ===
Club	Competition	Conference	City	Since	Sports	National championships
Saskatchewan Huskies	U Sports	Canada West	Saskatoon	1911	Basketball, football (men's only), ice hockey, soccer, volleyball, wrestling, cross country, track & field	27
Regina Cougars	U Sports	Canada West	Regina	1968	Basketball, ice hockey, soccer (women's only), volleyball (women's only), swimming, cross country, track & field, curling, golf, rugby	5
Regina Rams	U Sports	Canada West	Regina	1999	Football (men's only)	0

=== Defunct ===
Club	Sport	League	City	Years active
Saskatchewan Prairie Fire	Rugby union	RCSL	Regina	1998-2009
Saskatoon Yellow Jackets	Baseball	WCBL	Saskatoon	2002–2014
Saskatoon Accelerators	Soccer	CMISL	Saskatoon	2007–2010

== Team sports ==
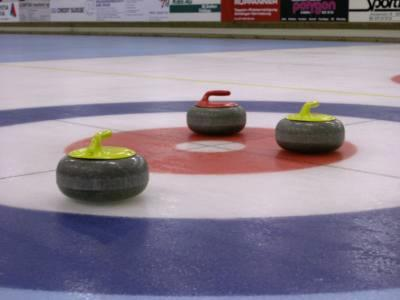
Curling stones

=== Curling ===
Curling is the provincial sport of Saskatchewan, and many towns and villages across Saskatchewan feature curling rinks. One of the first curling clubs of Saskatchewan was at Moosomin, which arose as early as 1880. By the early 1950s, the province was home to more than 500 affiliated curling clubs and boasted approximately 19,000 curlers, the most per capita in Canada.

The first world curling title was won in 1959 by Ernie Richardson's team from Regina, and they went on to win three more world titles in the following four years. Women's teams from Saskatchewan also enjoyed early success, with Joyce McKee's rink winning the inaugural Canadian women's championship in 1961; McKee went on to win five more. Overall, teams from Saskatchewan have won 7 Canadian men's championships, 5 world men's championships, 13 Canadian women's championships, and 4 world women's championships. Some other notable curlers from Saskatchewan include Vera Pezer, Rick Folk, Sandra Schmirler, and Ben Hebert. The latter two won gold medals at the 1998 and 2010 Olympics. In a 2019 poll conducted by The Sports Network (TSN), experts ranked Schmirler's team as the greatest women's team in Canada's history.

Saskatchewan communities have hosted 19 editions of the men's and women's national championships along with 6 editions of the men's and women's world championships.

=== Ice hockey ===
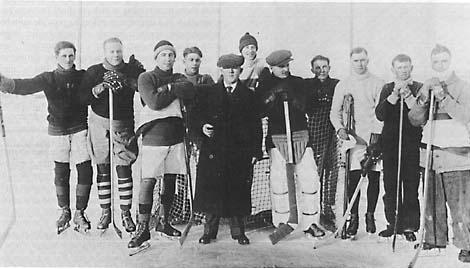
Eatonia's first hockey team in 1921

Hockey has long been one of the most popular sports in Saskatchewan, and the province has produced a large number of notable hockey players. Among these are Gordie Howe, also known as "Mr. Hockey," and Hayley Wickenheiser, who are widely regarded as among the best male and female hockey players of all time. More than 500 NHL players have come from Saskatchewan, the highest per capita for a province in Canada.

Professional hockey existed in Saskatchewan on-and-off through the first half of the 20th century, ranging from the Prince Albert Mintos in 1911 to the Saskatoon Quakers in 1959. The Quakers won a minor-professional Pacific Coast Hockey League championship in 1952. In the later stages of the 20th century and the early 21st centuries, a number of efforts were made to bring a National Hockey League franchise to the province, but none were successful. Most notably, local promoter Bill Hunter purchased the St. Louis Blues in 1983 and tried to relocate the franchise to Saskatoon, a move that was blocked by the league.

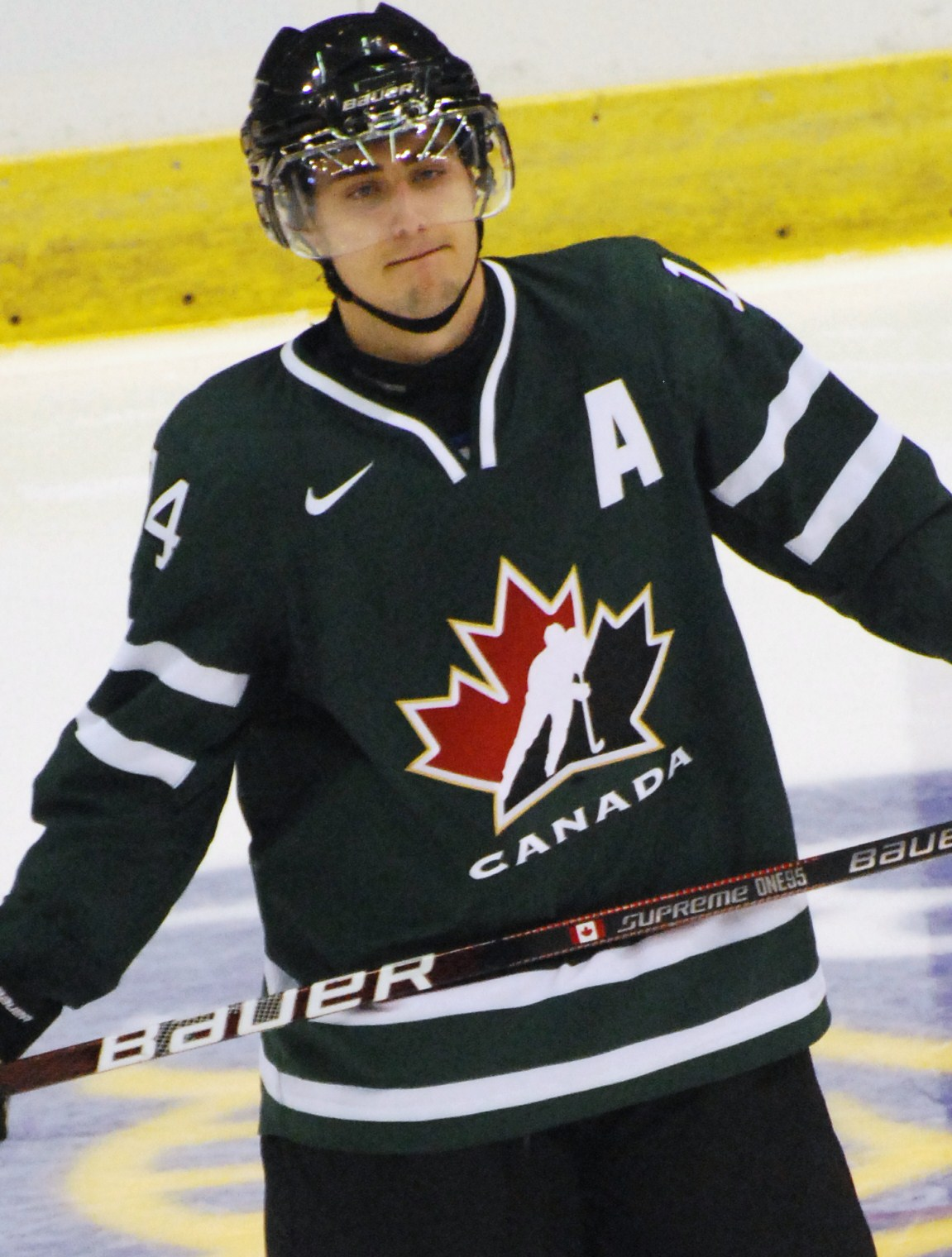
Regina's Jordan Eberle playing for Canada at the World Juniors

Saskatchewan has a long tradition of junior hockey. In the major junior arena, the province is home to five teams in the Western Hockey League (WHL). The oldest and most successful are the Regina Pats, who have won four Memorial Cup championships. The Prince Albert Raiders and Swift Current Broncos have each won one national title, in 1985 and 1989 respectively, while the Saskatoon Blades have made two appearances. The now-defunct Moose Jaw Canucks also made two appearances in the 1940s. The Memorial Cup tournament has been hosted in Saskatchewan nine times, most recently in 2018.

Saskatoon has twice hosted the World Junior Ice Hockey Championships, in 1991 and alongside Regina in 2010. Prominent Saskatchewan players to play in the tournament for Canada include Theoren Fleury, Ryan Getzlaf, Jordan Eberle, and Brayden Schenn. Canada's all-time leading scorer at the tournament, Connor Bedard, played three seasons for the Regina Pats and served as team captain.

Saskatchewan hosts its own Junior 'A' league, the Saskatchewan Junior Hockey League, which features 12 teams. The teams compete for the Credential Cup and the right to advance to the Anavet Cup against the Manitoba Junior Hockey League champion. If they win that series, they move on to the Canadian championship called the Royal Bank Cup. The Prince Albert Raiders have won the tournament three times, the Weyburn Red Wings twice and the Notre Dame Hounds and Humboldt Broncos once each. At this level internationally, the IIHF has created a tournament known as the World Junior A Challenge. This tournament, created in 2006, was first held in Humboldt and Estevan. It featured teams from Europe and North America, including two teams from Canada.

The province briefly hosted a women's professional team, the Saskatchewan Prairie Ice, which was based out of Lumsden. The team existed from 2003 to 2007 and competed in the Western Women's Hockey League (WWHL).

=== Football ===
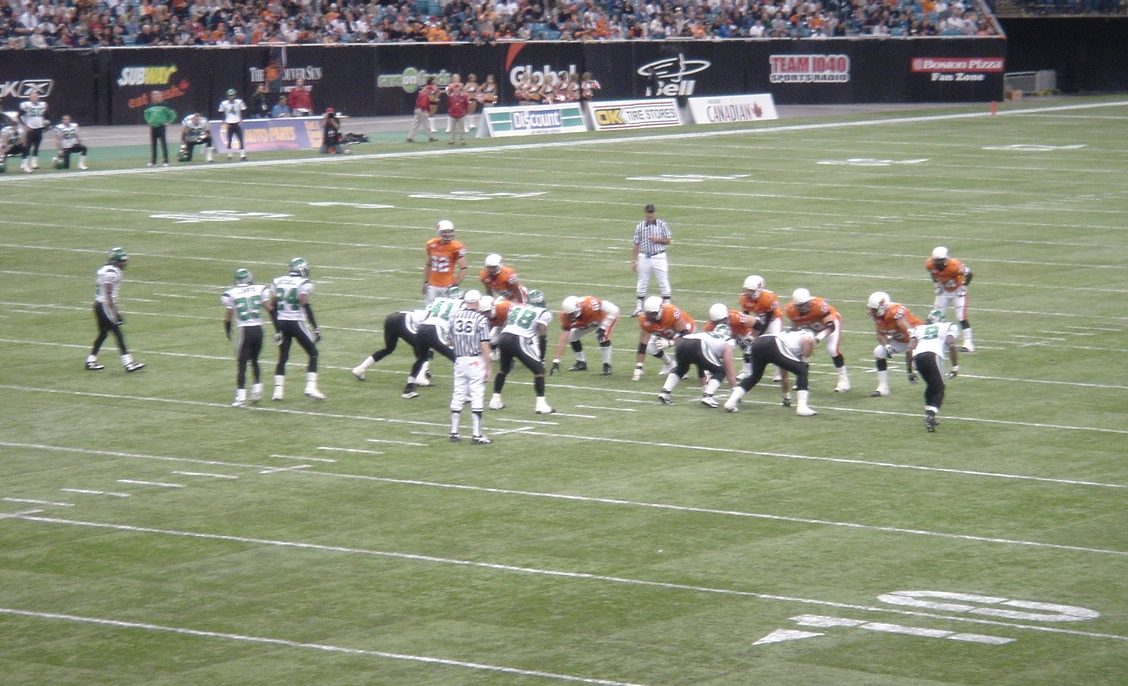
BC Lions vs. Saskatchewan Roughriders

Football is highly popular in Saskatchewan. The Canadian Junior Football League (CJFL) has two Saskatchewan teams competing in the Prairie Football Conference: the Saskatoon Hilltops and the Regina Thunder. Previous Regina teams included the Regina Bombers, Regina Dales, Regina Pats, and Regina Rams. The Rams joined with the University of Regina in 1999. Before departing the CJFL, the Rams were one of its most successful teams with 16 titles; only the Hilltops have more titles, with 22, including 9 out of 10 from 2010 to 2019. The Thunder were the only team besides the Hilltops to win that decade, winning their lone championship in 2013.

Saskatchewan also boasts two successful teams in the Western Women's Canadian Football League (WWCFL), the Saskatoon Valkyries and the Regina Riot. Since the league was established in 2011, they are the only two teams to win the league championship, with the Valkyries winning 10 titles and the Riot 3; the league took a two-season hiatus from 2020 to 2021 due to the COVID-19 pandemic.

Saskatchewan's most popular professional sports team are the Roughriders of the Canadian Football League. Established in 1910 as the Regina Rugby Club, the "Riders" are one of the oldest sports teams and community-owned franchises in North America. They compete in the CFL's West Division. The Roughriders have made 20 Grey Cup appearances and have won the Canadian championship five times, most recently the 112th Grey Cup in 2025, which was hosted in Winnipeg.

=== Baseball ===
Many recreational leagues abound around the province, and baseball, both fastball and slowpitch, are featured in many community festivals, rodeos and reunion gatherings. The sport has a rich history in the province. A number of Saskatchewan teams participated in the Western Canada League Minors in the early 20th century, with the Moose Jaw Robin Hoods and Saskatoon Quakers each winning multiple titles before the league disbanded in the early 1920s. In the 1940s, a number of Saskatchewan women played in the All-American Girls Professional Baseball League, including Arleene Noga, Mary Baker, and Daisy Junor, whose stories were re-told in the play Diamond Girls. The women were inducted into the Saskatchewan Sports Hall of Fame. In the 1950s, the community of Indian Head became the home of an all-black baseball team called the Rockets, made up of segregated Negro league players from Jacksonville, Florida. The team was extremely popular and reportedly drew crowds of thousands of people to the small town. In 2022, the Rockets were inducted into the Saskatchewan Baseball Hall of Fame.

The Western Canadian Baseball League (WCBL) is a summer amateur college wood-bat semi-pro baseball league, which features several Saskatchewan teams. The Swift Current 57s are the league's most successful team along with the Okotoks Dawgs, having won 6 titles, most recently in 2017. Saskatoon was awarded an expansion team in 2023; the Saskatoon Berries replaced the defunct Yellow Jackets, who folded in 2014.

Saskatchewan has seen a number of minor-professional baseball clubs come and go since the early 1990s. The Saskatoon Riot and Regina Cyclones were formed in 1994 and were members of the independent North Central League, which featured teams in Saskatchewan, North Dakota, South Dakota, and Minnesota. In 1995, the Riot and Cyclones left the NCL to help form a new independent league called the Prairie League. This league also saw the creation of a third Saskatchewan-based team, the Moose Jaw Diamond Dogs, with other teams in Manitoba, North Dakota, South Dakota, Minnesota, and Wisconsin. The Prairie League lasted three seasons, folding in 1997.

The most recent attempt at professional baseball in Saskatchewan came in 2003. The Canadian Baseball League formed in the winter of 2001–02, and the Saskatoon Legends were established as the province's lone representative in the league. Unlike the NCL and Prairie League before it, the CBL saw itself as an alternative league as opposed to an independent league, wanting to be seen as an alternative to Major League Baseball akin to the Nippon Pro Baseball in Japan and the Korea Baseball Organization in South Korea. Poor promotion and low attendance in most league cities saw the CBL abbreviate its first season at the All-Star break in July 2003. The intention was to revamp the league for the 2004 season, but those plans were quietly dropped in the winter of 2003.

The Canadian Baseball Hall of Fame and the Saskatchewan Baseball Hall of Fame honours achievements in Canadian baseball. Dave Shury from Saskatchewan was one of the more recently selected candidates.

=== Basketball ===
Saskatchewan hosts one of the most prestigious annual boys high school tournaments in the Bedford Road Invitational Tournament (BRIT). The tournament is held at Bedford Road Collegiate in Saskatoon in early January every year. It has featured teams from across Canada, along with the United States, Australia, and Taiwan. The most famous team to ever participate at BRIT was the 1988 New York Gauchos AAU team, which featured a number of future NCAA and NBA stars on its roster.

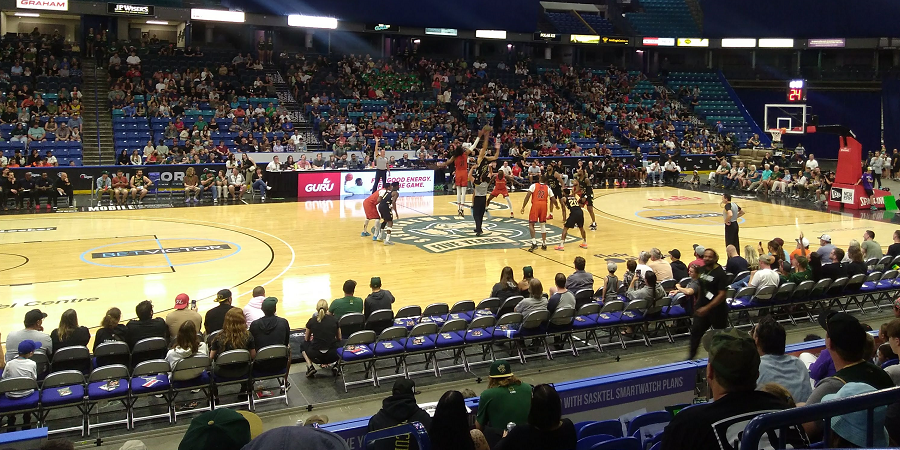
The Rattlers tip-off against the Vancouver Bandits in 2023

Saskatchewan has flirted with top-level basketball since the beginning of the 1990s. The province's first professional team was the Saskatchewan Storm, who played in the World Basketball League from 1990 until the league's collapse in 1992. The team hosted the majority of its games in Saskatoon, but also played occasionally in Regina. When the WBL folded part way through the 1992 season, many of its Canadian franchises together created the National Basketball League. The Storm rebranded as the Saskatoon Slam. The NBL would play only one full season, and the Slam won the 1993 league title, the province's first professional basketball championship. They defeated the Cape Breton Breakers in a final series that was played entirely in Saskatoon as a cost-cutting measure. The league began a 1994 season, but folded part way through, taking the Slam with it. Six years later, the Youngstown Hawks of the International Basketball Association were purchased and relocated to Saskatoon, where they became the Saskatchewan Hawks. The Hawks played one season in the IBA, then joined the Continental Basketball Association for the 2001–02 season. Ownership instability led to the team folding in 2002.

The province was left without professional basketball until Saskatoon was awarded a charter franchise in the fledgling Canadian Elite Basketball League in 2018. The Saskatchewan Rattlers (now Saskatoon Mamba) saw immediate success. They were chosen to host the CEBL's inaugural Championship Weekend in 2019, and there they won the league's first title, bringing Saskatchewan its second professional basketball championship.

Saskatoon had a top-ranked team on the FIBA 3x3 World Tour, led by Michael Linklater. The team was ranked 5th in the world in 2017.

The men's and women's Huskies teams from the University of Saskatchewan have won a combined three national titles, while the University of Regina Cougars women's team has won one.

=== Lacrosse ===
As of 2007, the Saskatchewan SWAT lacrosse team competes in Tier I, Junior B division of the Rocky Mountain Lacrosse League (Alberta Lacrosse Association). The SWAT are composed of players under the age of 21 and as they are a Saskatchewan all-star team, automatically earn the right to represent Saskatchewan at the Founders Cup tournament.

The Prairie Gold Lacrosse League (Saskatchewan Lacrosse Association) or Saskatchewan Major Box Lacrosse League, is a Junior B box lacrosse league which comprises 8 Saskatchewan teams, 4 in the north division and 4 in the south division. The league also integrates two senior level teams with the Junior B teams. As a result, these two teams do not participate in the same playoffs as the Junior B teams. Instead, the Saskatoon Brewers and Regina Heat play against each other to determine a Saskatchewan senior champion. The senior champion is not eligible to participate in the Mann Cup tournament.

In 2016, Saskatchewan acquired a professional box lacrosse team when the Edmonton Rush of the National Lacrosse League relocated to Saskatoon and became the Saskatchewan Rush. The team won both their Division Title and the League Championship in their first season in Saskatoon. This began a run of three straight finals appearances, with the Rush winning the championship again in 2018.

=== Rugby ===
Rugby has been an active Saskatchewan sport as early as 1927, with the Saskwanis Rugby Team being inducted into the Saskatchewan Sports Hall of Fame as the Western Canadian Rugby Champions. Saskatchewan Prairie Fire was a Rugby Canada Super League team, playing home matches at the Regina Rugby Club in Regina before the league disbanded in 2009. The Prairie Fire were amongst the West Division's top teams, capturing three straight West Division championships, losing in 2005 and 2006 to the Newfoundland Rock. The 2007 championship was decided on August 18, 2007, in Regina, with the Prairie Fire capturing the MacTier Cup 28–12 over the Niagara Thunder.

=== Ringette ===
Ringette Saskatchewan organizes ringette teams and events across the province. Terry McAdam was one of the individuals behind the establishment of the National Ringette League (NRL), and was inducted into the Ringette Canada Hall of Fame in 2021. McAdam also helped found the province's first NRL team, the Saskatoon Wild, which played for several seasons before folding. In 2021, the Saskatchewan Heat were established as a new NRL team.

=== Soccer ===
1905 saw the establishment of the Saskatchewan Soccer Association in Grenfell. Some Saskatchewan players who have made history in soccer have been Norman Sheldon, David Greyeyes Steele, and Lorne Gray. The Sons of England Football team was one Saskatchewan notable team, which played as early as 1910 in Saskatchewan. Teams would compete for the Holmes Cup and Caswell Cup.

Professional soccer has a very short history in Saskatchewan. The Canadian Major Indoor Soccer League was established in 2007 and saw Saskatoon awarded a charter franchise, the Saskatoon Accelerators. The 2007 season was a series of exhibition matches between the four teams in the CMISL. Saskatoon won both their matches and was the only team of the four to go undefeated during this Showcase Series. The league contracted in 2010 and Saskatoon lost its team; the league went on hiatus in 2013 and was never revived. In March, 2021, Saskatoon Prairieland Park Corporation announced that Marquis Downs would no longer host thoroughbred racing and that it was in negotiations with Living Sky Sports and Entertainment to repurpose the site for a soccer-specific stadium. However, in September, 2023, it was announced that plans for a new soccer stadium had been put on hold due to economic difficulties.

== University sports ==
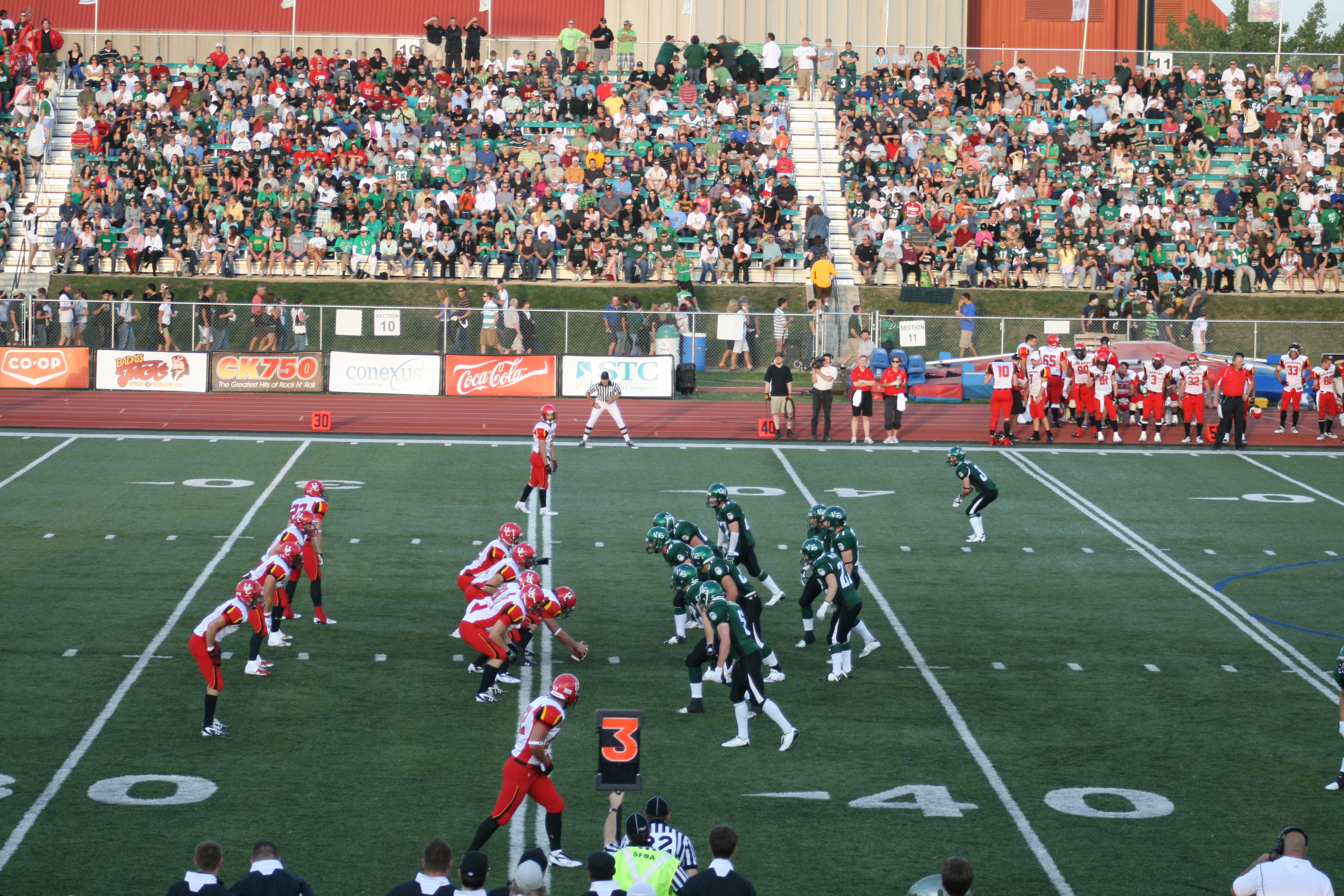
The Saskatchewan Huskies facing the University of Calgary in 2009.

Student athletes from the University of Saskatchewan (U of S) and the University of Regina (U of R) compete in the Canada West division of U Sports and are known as the Huskies and Cougars, with the Regina football team alone being known as the Rams. The U of R was directly affiliated with the U of S until it was granted independent status in 1974. Until the 1990s, women's teams at each university were known as the Huskiettes and the Cougettes/Lady Cougars, respectively. Each university has athletes competing in basketball, football (men's only), soccer (women's only at U of R), volleyball (women's only at U of R), cross country, and track & field; the U of S also has wrestling, while the U of R boasts swimming, curling, golf, and rugby.

Huskies teams have won 129 Canada West championships and 27 U Sports national championships. This includes 12 men's and women's track & field championships, and 3 Vanier Cup championships in football. The Cougars have won 29 conference championships and 5 national championships, including consecutive men's wrestling titles in 1997 and 1998 and men's and women's curling titles in 2009 and 2010. The Rams have not won any U Sports national championships, but prior to merging with the U of R were a successful Canadian Junior Football League team, winning 10 championships, including 5 out of 6 from 1993 to 1998.

== Saskatchewan Games ==
Saskatchewan organizes bi-annual summer and winter games, multi-sport competitions in the style of the Olympic games. The first edition was the 1972 Saskatchewan Summer Games in Moose Jaw, followed by the 1974 Saskatchewan Winter Games in The Battlefords.

The purpose of the Saskatchewan Games is to provide an opportunity for the province's developing athletes, coaches and officials to participate in a multi sport event in preparation for a higher level of competition. The participants are divided by nine Sport, Culture and Recreation Districts: South East, Prairie Central, Parkland Valley, Lakeland, Rivers West, South West, Regina, Saskatoon, and Northern. These districts then compete against each other.

== Major events ==
Saskatchewan communities have hosted many national and international sports competitions in a variety of sports.

=== Curling ===
Event	Host community & year
Montana's Brier	Saskatoon (1946, 1965, 1989, 2000, 2004, 2012), Regina (1955, 1976, 1992, 2006, 2018)
Scotties Tournament of Hearts	Regina (1962, 1982, 1998, 2008), Saskatoon (1972, 1991), Moose Jaw (2015, 2020)
Canadian Olympic Curling Trials	Regina (2001), Saskatoon (2021)
World Men's Curling Championships	Regina (1973, 1983, 2011)
World Women's Curling Championships	Moose Jaw (1983), Swift Current (2010, 2016)

=== Hockey ===
Event	Host community & year
Memorial Cup	Regina, Moose Jaw & Winnipeg (1947), Regina (1955, 2001, 2018), Regina & Flin Flon (1957), Regina & Montreal (1969), Regina & Brandon (1980), Saskatoon (1989, 2013)
IIHF World Junior Championship	Saskatoon (1991), Saskatoon & Regina (2010)
U Sports University Cup	Saskatoon (1998, 1999, 2000, 2013, 2014)
4 Nations Cup	Saskatoon (2018)
2007 Super Series	Saskatoon (2007)

=== Baseball ===
Event	Host community & year
Women's Softball World Cup	Saskatoon (2002)
Men's Softball World Cup	Saskatoon (1988, 2009, 2015)
U-18 Baseball World Cup	Saskatoon (1984)

=== Canada Games ===
Event	Host community & year
Canada Winter Games	Saskatoon (1971)
Canada Summer Games	Saskatoon (1989), Regina (2005)
Western Canada Summer Games	Regina (1975, 1987), Saskatoon (1979), Prince Albert (1999), Swift Current (2019)

=== Other ===
Event	Sport	Host community & year
Grey Cup	Football	Regina (1995, 2003, 2013, 2022)
CEBL Championship Weekend	Basketball	Saskatoon (2019)
Canadian Ringette Championships	Ringette	Regina (1986, 2002, 2014, 2023), Saskatoon (1994, 2010)
Canadian Figure Skating Championships	Figure skating	Regina (1960, 1984), Saskatoon (1991, 2003, 2009)
North American Indigenous Games	Various	Prince Albert (1993), Regina (2014)
FIVB Volleyball Women's U21 World Championship	Volleyball	Saskatoon & Edmonton (1999)

== Saskatchewan Sports Hall of Fame ==
A sports Hall of Fame was established in Regina in 1966, first known as the Molson Sports Hall of Fame, as the Brewery was a major partner. It was renamed the Saskatchewan Sports Hall of Fame in 1974. As of 2022, there were more than 500 inductees in the Hall, including 247 athletes and 127 championship teams across 53 sports.

== Other sports ==
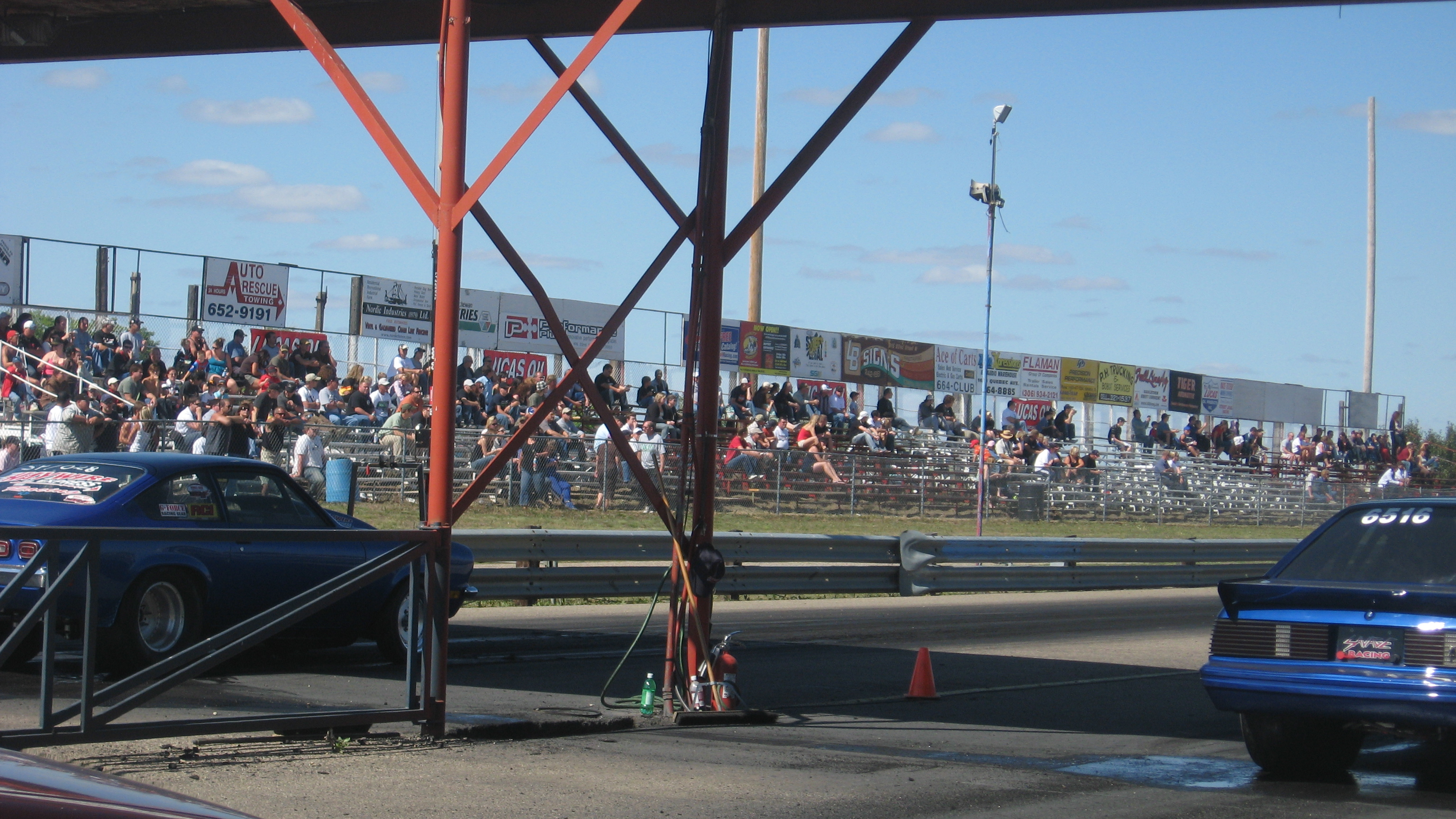
East bleachers at SIR, from the staging lanes.

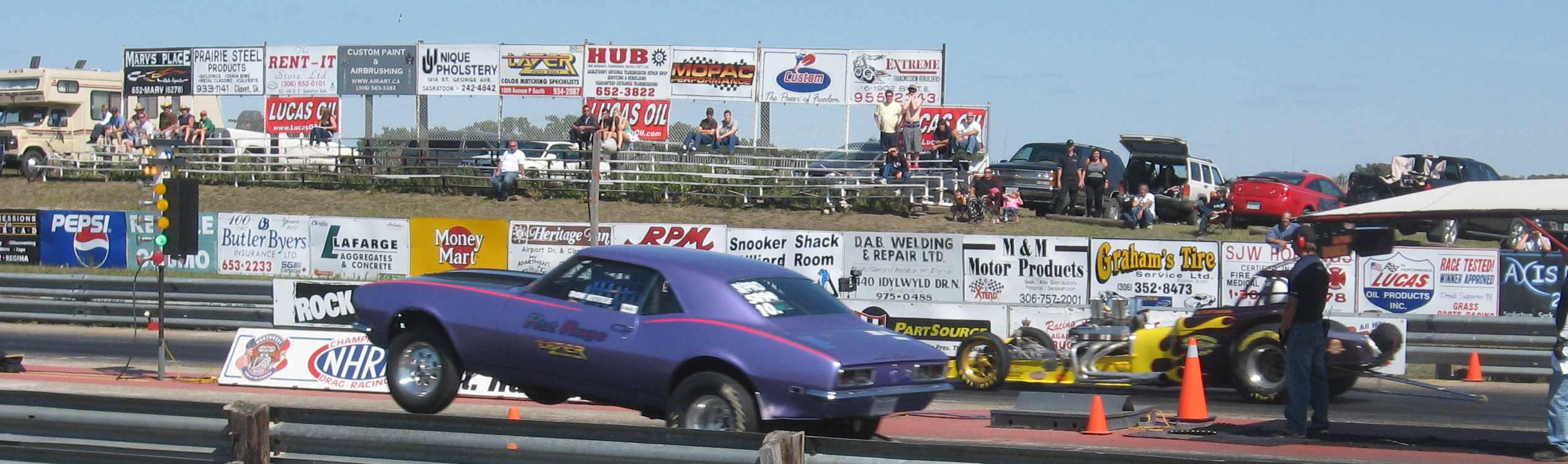
Pro Camaro at launch at SIR, with Jody "The Kid" Beauchemin's modern long-wheelbase fuellie altered Altered Vision in the right lane.

=== Motor racing ===
Saskatchewan International Raceway (SIR) is a drag racing facility. Kings Park Speedway and Auto Clearing Motor Speedway are paved oval racing venues primarily used for stock car racing. There are various dirt racetracks across Saskatchewan that feature midget racing and other modified racing. Martensville Speedway features go kart racing. Several other forms of racing exist in Saskatchewan such as rally racing, ice rallying, and snowmobile racing.

Saskatoon used to host F1 Powerboat Racing on the South Saskatchewan River. The event was known as the Great Northern River Roar was an annual stop on the Champboat Series tour, and featured some of the top names in the sport such as the Seebold family. Unfortunately, Canadian tobacco advertising laws caused the event to lose title sponsorship and after one year of cobbled together local support, the event folded. During its time in Saskatchewan, pilots heralded the event as the Indy 500 of powerboat racing, meaning it was the most prestigious to win. The course was also noted for being very dangerous as the pillars for the bridges coupled with the tight turns made for skilled piloting of the boats on the river.

Many other cities and lakes feature personal water craft or Sea-Doo racing. As well, several water skiing and Sea-Doo stunt events are held around the province.

=== Golf ===
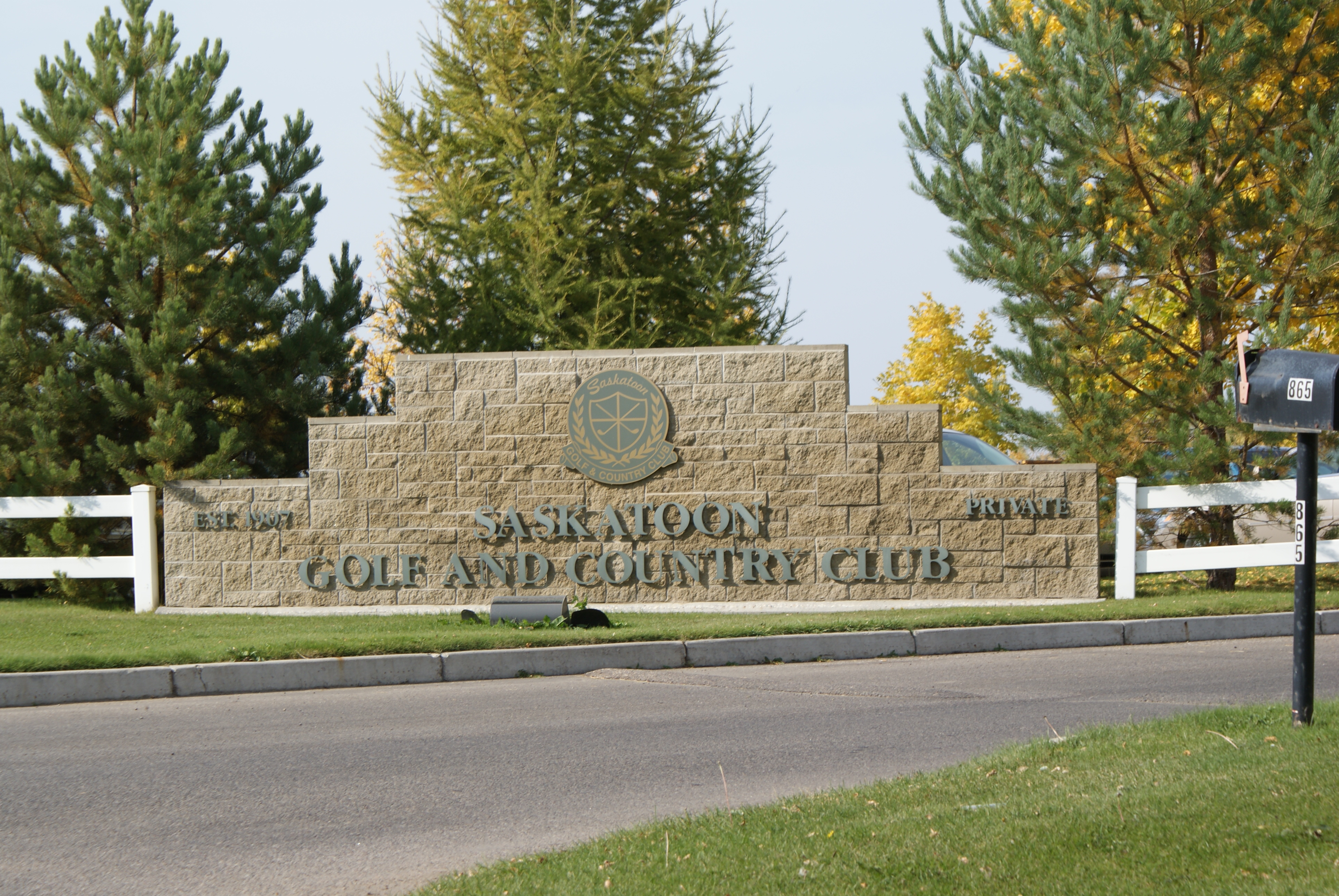
Saskatoon Golf and Country Club

Many Saskatchewan communities feature 9 or 18-hole sand greens or grass greens golf courses. The Saskatchewan Sports Hall of Fame has inducted 10 golfers from Saskatchewan between its inception 1966 and 2007. Dr. Jack Leddy, Barbara Turnbull, Pat Fletcher, Dr. Robert D. Reid, Joanne Goulet, Thomas (Tom) Ross, Phil Lederhouse, James Joseph (Jim) Scissons, Gordon Keith Rever, and Geraldine Street.

One of the first Saskatchewan golf courses was a four-hole course in Regina, Assiniboia, North West Territories located where the Crescents area now stands. In 1899 this golf course was expanded to a 9-hole course. The Wascana Country Club was designed in 1911, and was one of the more prestigious courses of Saskatchewan. Presently Elk Ridge Resort and Waskesiu Golf Course near the Prince Albert National Park is one of the best known across Canada. This 27-hole championship course features links stretching from 5,200 to 6,800-yards.

The provincial amateur sport governing body is Golf Saskatchewan.

=== Horse racing ===
Marquis Downs was a horse race track in Saskatoon for both Thoroughbred and Standardbred horse racing. Horse trainers, owners and jockeys competed in the Saskatchewan Derby, Prairie Lily Sales Stake, Saskatchewan Futurity, and on Heritage Day. In March 2021, Saskatoon Prairieland Park Corporation announced that Marquis Downs would no longer host thoroughbred racing, ending a long era of horse racing. However, Marquis Downs agreed to donate all of its equipment to a new racing track being built northwest of Saskatoon, to be called Moosomin Downs. Cathy Wedge, Olympic level equestrian rider, was inducted into both Saskatoon and Saskatchewan Hall of Fames. Robin Hahn, from Belle Plaine, is both rider and builder of the equestrian arena. Gina Smith and her horse Malte III competed internationally.

=== Skiing ===
Before Blackstrap Mountain was constructed for the Canada Winter Games, ski enthusiasts would use the Saskatoon Ski Jump constructed on the south side of the South Saskatchewan River weir. Both cross country and downhill skiing are enjoyed in the winter months of Saskatchewan at Table Mountain and Blackstrap Mountain ski hills, and various scenic cross country ski trails associated with parks and golf courses. Water skiers make use of lake and river water ways. Blackstrap, Buffalo Pound, Duck Mountain, Mission Ridge, Mount Joy Ski Club, Ochapowace Mountain, Ski Timber Ridge, Table Mountain, Twin Towers Ski Area, White Track Mission Ridge Winter Park, and Wapiti Valley are all Saskatchewan ski resorts offering down hill skiing opportunities.

Cross Country Saskatchewan (CCS) develops programs and training for the CCC Level, Sask Sport and Sask Ski.

=== Water sports: swimming, diving, water ski, wakeboard ===
Swimming pools were constructed between 1910 and 1920 in some Saskatchewan communities. Before this time natural geographical features such as lakes and rivers were the only seasonal medium in which to swim. Four gold medals were achieved by Phyllis Dewar of Moose Jaw in 1934 Swim Saskatchewan promotes the development of the swimming sport in Saskatchewan. The Provincial Sport Governing Body for the Sport of Diving is Sask Diving Inc. The official governing body for water skiing and wakeboarding in Saskatchewan is Water Ski and Wakeboard Saskatchewan which comes together with Water Ski and Wakeboard Canada for events, tournaments and championships.

=== Wrestling, boxing, judo, weight-lifting ===
His Worship Pat Fiacco, known as "Sugar Ray Fiacco," the former Mayor of Regina, has held provincial and Canadian amateur boxing championships, such as the Canadas amateur bantam weight crown 1980.

Judo is practiced in many communities across the province. The formal name of the non-profit organization is the Saskatchewan Kodokan Black Belt Association, but is more commonly known as Judo Saskatchewan. The organization holds several regional competitions each season, four provincial tournaments, a closed provincial championships and a one primary annual shiai (tournament) called the Sask Open. Saskatchewan has produced two Olympic athletes: Nancy Jewitt-Filteau and Frazer Will, and has had several other Olympic athletes train and coach in the province, including Sandra Greaves and Ewan Beaton.

== Sports and recreation ==
=== Participation ===
Russ Kisby (BAPE'63, LLD'96) University of Saskatchewan alumni was one of the founders of participACTION which started in 1972 and was replaced by In Motion in the year 2000. ParticipACTION promoted a healthy lifestyle, physical activity, and nutritional diet to increase health and well-being.

=== Saskatchewan in motion ===
Encourages physical activity by all Saskatchewan residents. The Saskatchewan In Motion campaign will proceed on four areas, building partnerships such as Saskatchewan Parks and Recreation Association Inc., Saskatoon Health Region, SaskCulture Inc. and Sask Sport Inc., raising awareness, mobilizing communities as well as monitoring and celebrating success.

== Notable Saskatchewan sports personalities ==
=== Athletes ===
- Roger Aldag from Gull Lake was a Canadian football offensive lineman who played for the Saskatchewan Roughriders from 1976 through 1992 and who was inducted into the Canadian Football Hall of Fame.
- Mary Geraldine (Bonnie) Baker, née George was an all-star catcher in the All-American Girls Professional Baseball League
- Ethel Mary Catherwood or "The Saskatoon Lily" from Saskatoon was a Canadian track and field athlete who won a gold medal in high jump at the 1928 Summer Olympics
- Rick Folk was skip of the winning team in the 1980 Labatt Brier and 1980 World Men's Curling Championship
- Emile Francis (b. 1926)
- George Patrick Genereux was a Canadian Gold medal-winning trap shooter and physician from Saskatoon.
- Gordon "Gordie" Howe OC from Floral, was a professional ice hockey player known as Mr. Hockey".
- William Dickenson ("Wild Bill") Hunter CM from Saskatoon was a Canadian hockey owner, general manager, coach and founder of the Western Hockey League.
- Diane Jones-Konihowski C.M., B.Ed. is an Olympic pentathlete.
- Catriona Le May Doan, O.C. from Saskatoon was a Canadian speed skater and a double Olympic champion in the 500m.
- Rueben Mayes from North Battleford, is a former National Football League running back with the New Orleans Saints and Seattle Seahawks.
- Mark McMorris from Regina is a world-champion, Olympic bronze-medalist, and 11 time X-Games champion snowboarder.
- Michael ("Mike") Mintenko from Moose Jaw is an Olympic silver-medalist and a freestyle and butterfly swimmer
- Blair Morgan from Prince Albert is a multi-time CMRC Canadian National championship-winning motocross racer, World Snocross snowmobile champion and a 5-times X-Games gold medalist
- Jason Parker, from Yorkton is a Canadian speed skater and an Olympic Silver Medalist from the 2006 Winter Olympics in Torino, Italy.
- Terry Stephen Puhl of Melville, Canada is a former professional baseball player.
- Glenn "Chico" Resch from Moose Jaw was a professional ice hockey goaltender
- Ernest M. Richardson C.M. from Stoughton was a Canadian and world curling champion.
- Jon Ryan from Regina is a punter in the NFL.
- Sandra Schmirler SOM was a Canadian curler, an Olympic and triple World Champion.
- Eddie Shore from Fort Qu'Appelle was a professional NHL ice hockey player.
- Meaghan Simister from Regina is a Canadian Olympic luger.
- Bryan Trottier was a forward with the New York Islanders and Pittsburgh Penguins of the NHL; he was inducted to the Hockey Hall of Fame in 1997.
- Hayley Wickenheiser from Shaunavon is a four-time Olympic gold-medalist and was the first female skater to play full-time professional men's hockey.

=== Media ===
- Johnny Esaw (June 11, 1925 – April 6, 2013) was a Canadian sports broadcaster from North Battleford.
- Darren Dutchyshen (December 19, 1966 – May 15, 2024) from Porcupine Plain was a co-host of TSN's evening edition of SportsCentre.
- Martine Gaillard from Melfort is a Canadian sports television personality currently working for Rogers Sportsnet.
- Mike Toth from Moose Jaw is currently the lead anchor on the evening edition of Sportsnet Connected.

Several other personalities on Canada's sports networks have also spent time in Saskatchewan. Peter Loubardias, currently the voice of Canadian Hockey League games on Rogers Sportsnet, was at one time the host of Sportsline on then-STV (now Global) in Saskatoon. As well, Roger Millions, the current voice of the Calgary Flames on Rogers Sportsnet was also on Sportsline on then-STV in Saskatoon. R.J. Broadhead who is host of Sportsnet Connected on Rogers Sportsnet, was also the sports reporter on Global Saskatoon's evening newscasts. Jay Onrait is currently an anchor at TSN; at one point, he was the sports director at Global Saskatoon.

== See also ==
- Sports Culture of Saskatchewan
- List of curling clubs in Saskatchewan
- List of ice hockey teams in Saskatchewan
- North Saskatchewan Junior B Hockey League
- Prairie Junior Hockey League
- Qu’Appelle Valley Hockey League
- Saskatchewan Junior Hockey League teams
- List of football teams in Canada
- List of lacrosse teams in Canada
