= List of sports teams in Saskatoon =

Saskatoon is the largest city in Saskatchewan, and is home to many teams across a variety of sports.

== Baseball ==
Team	League	Years	Championships
Saskatoon Anavets	Northern Saskatchewan Baseball League	1962–74	1 (1972)
Saskatoon Gems	Saskatchewan Baseball League	1952–57	0
Saskatoon Commodores	Western Canada Baseball League	1958–63	0
Saskatoon Ambassadors	Northern Saskatchewan Baseball League	1962	0
Saskatoon Blues	Western Canada Baseball League	1964	0
Saskatoon Stallions	North Central League	1994	0
Saskatoon Stallions	Prairie League	1995–97	0
Saskatoon Yellow Jackets	Western Major Baseball League	2002–14	0
Saskatoon Legends	Canadian Baseball League	2003	0
Saskatoon Berries	Western Canadian Baseball League	2023–	0

== Basketball ==
Team	League	Years	Championships
Saskatchewan Storm	World Basketball League	1990–92	0
Saskatoon Slam	National Basketball League	1993–94	1 (1993)
Saskatchewan Hawks	International Basketball Association	2000–01	0
Saskatchewan Hawks	Continental Basketball Association	2001–02	0
Saskatchewan Rattlers	Canadian Elite Basketball League	2018–	1 (2019)

== Football ==
Team	League	Years	Championships
Saskatoon Hilltops	Canadian Junior Football League	1947–	23
Saskatoon Valkyries	Western Women's Canadian Football League	2010–	9
Saskatoon Sirens	Lingerie Football League	2012	0

== Hockey ==
Team	League	Years	Championships
Saskatoon Sheiks	Western Canada Hockey League	1921–22, 1923–25	0
Saskatoon Crescents	Western Canada Hockey League	1922–23	0
Saskatoon Sheiks	Western Hockey League	1925–26	0
Saskatoon Sheiks	Prairie Hockey League	1926–28	0
Saskatoon Crescents	Western Canada Hockey League	1932–33	0
Saskatoon Junior Quakers	Saskatchewan Junior Hockey League		
Saskatoon Flyers	Saskatchewan Military Hockey League	1942–45	
Saskatoon Navy	Saskatchewan Military Hockey League	1942–45	
Saskatoon Falcons	Saskatchewan Junior Hockey League	1944–46	
Saskatoon Elks	Western Canada Senior Hockey League	1945–47	
Saskatoon Quakers	Western Canada Senior Hockey League	1947–51	1 (1950-51)
Saskatoon Quakers	Pacific Coast Hockey League	1951–52	1 (1951-52)
Saskatoon Quakers	Western Hockey League	1952–56, 1958–59	0
Saskatoon Blades	Saskatchewan Junior Hockey League	1964–66	0
Saskatoon Blades	Western Hockey League	1966–	0
Saskatoon J's	Saskatchewan Junior Hockey League	1968–72	0
Saskatoon Olympics	Saskatchewan Junior Hockey League	1972–82	0
Saskatoon Titans	Saskatchewan Junior Hockey League	1991–93	0
Saskatoon Rage	Saskatchewan Junior Hockey League	1998–99	0
Saskatoon Wesleys	Saskatchewan Junior Hockey League, Prairie Junior Hockey League	1969–	

== University ==
School	League	Years
Saskatchewan Polytechnic Amaruks	CCAA	1972–
University of Saskatchewan Huskies	U Sports	1912–

== Others ==
Team	Sport	League	Years
Saskatoon Accelerators	Indoor Soccer	Canadian Major Indoor Soccer League	2007–10
Saskatchewan SWAT	Box Lacrosse	Rocky Mountain Lacrosse League	2007–
Saskatchewan Rush	Lacrosse	National Lacrosse League	2015–
Saskatchewan Heat	Ringette	National Ringette League	2021–
