= Triple-A (baseball) =

Highest level of competition in Minor League Baseball

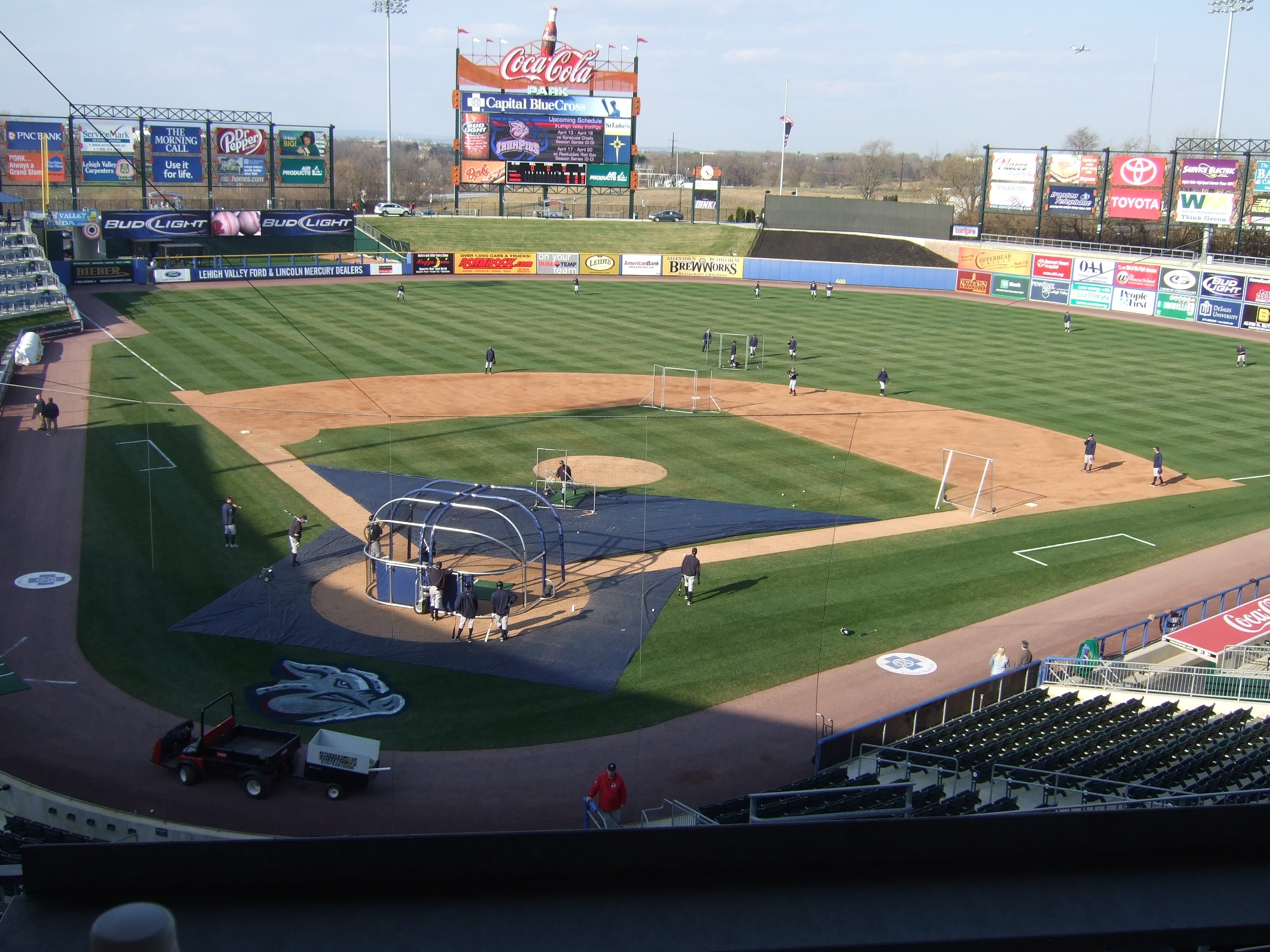
Coca-Cola Park in Allentown, Pennsylvania, home of the Lehigh Valley IronPigs, the Triple-A affiliate of the Philadelphia Phillies

Triple-A (officially Class AAA) has been the highest level of play in Minor League Baseball in the United States since 1946. Currently, two leagues operate at the Triple-A level, the International League (IL) and the Pacific Coast League (PCL). There are 30 teams, one per Major League Baseball (MLB) franchise, with 20 in the IL and 10 in the PCL. Triple-A teams are generally located in smaller to mid-size cities which do not have sports teams of the "Big Four" leagues, such as Syracuse, Toledo, Reno and Omaha, as well as larger metropolitan areas without MLB teams that also have a team in another major professional league, such as Jacksonville, Columbus, Buffalo, and Indianapolis. Four Triple-A teams play in the same metro areas as their parent clubs. (Note: The Gwinnett Stripers, St. Paul Saints, Sugar Land Space Cowboys and Tacoma Rainiers)

All current Triple-A teams are located in the United States; before 2008, some Triple-A leagues also fielded teams in Canada, and from 1967 to 2020 the Mexican League was classified as Triple-A. Reasons for the relocation of these teams were solely because of costs and attendance. Other than the current two Triple-A leagues, only three other leagues have ever held the classification.

== History ==
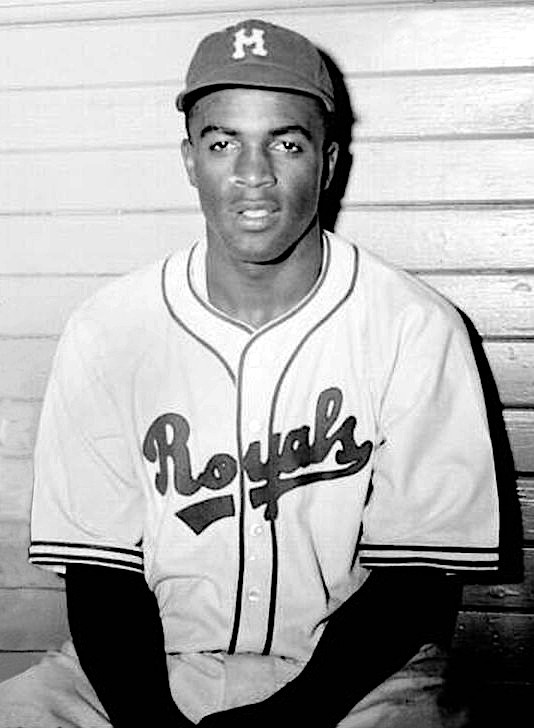
Jackie Robinson, then with the Triple-A Montreal Royals in July 1946

Prior to 1946, the top level of Minor League Baseball was Double-A, which had been established in 1912. The Triple-A classification was created before the 1946 season, and began with all three leagues then in Double-A moving up to the new level:

- American Association (AA)
- International League (IL)
- Pacific Coast League (PCL)

This structure persisted for the next 75 years with only a few changes:

- 1952–1957: The PCL was classified as "Open" for these six seasons, in anticipation of it potentially becoming a third major league; once the Brooklyn Dodgers and New York Giants relocated from New York City to California, the PCL returned to Triple-A for the 1958 season.
- 1963–1968: The AA did not operate during these six seasons.
- 1967: The Mexican League received Triple-A classification; it had previously been Double-A since 1955
- 1979: The Inter-American League debuted with a Triple-A classification; the league disbanded in June
- 1998: Teams from the AA, which disbanded after the 1997 season, were added to the PCL and IL

The IL, PCL, and Mexican League continued as Triple-A leagues until Major League Baseball reorganized the minor leagues prior to the 2021 season. At that time, the IL and PCL were temporarily renamed Triple-A East and Triple-A West, respectively. The Mexican League continues to operate, independently. Following MLB's acquisition of the rights to the names of the historical minor leagues, they announced on March 16, 2022, that the leagues would once again be called the International League and the Pacific Coast League, effective with the 2022 season.

=== Countries ===
While all current and the majority of past Triple-A teams have been located in the United States, Triple-A teams have also been based in:

- Canada: teams including the Montreal Royals and Ottawa Lynx of the IL and the Calgary Cannons, Edmonton Trappers, and Vancouver Mounties of the PCL
- Cuba: the Havana Sugar Kings were members of the IL from 1954 to 1960
- Dominican Republic: the short-lived Inter-American League had a team based here in 1979
- Mexico: all Mexican League teams
- Panama: one Inter-American League team in 1979
- Venezuela: two Inter-American League teams in 1979

== Purpose ==
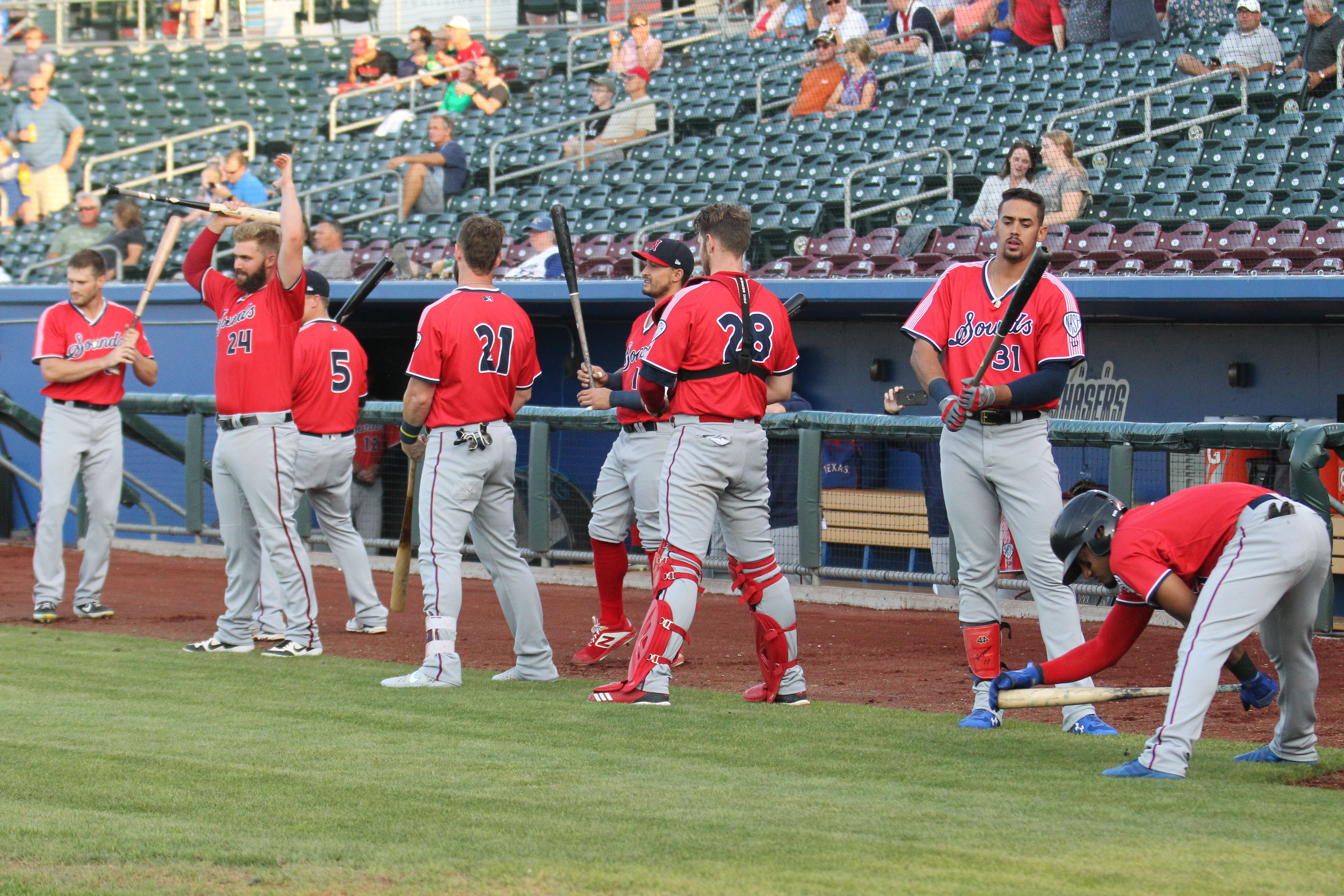
Players of the Triple-A Nashville Sounds in August 2019

The main purpose of Triple-A teams is to prepare players for the major leagues. In 2010, ESPN wrote:

Winning is nice, but secondary. It's much more important for a young prospect like outfielder Xavier Paul to get regular at-bats against lefties, or work on dropping down sacrifice bunts with a runner on first, than it is to take three of four from the Portland Beavers.

Both young players and veterans play for Triple-A teams.

There are the young prospects speeding through the organization on the fastest treadmill, the guys who used to be young prospects who are in danger of topping out in Triple-A, the 30-somethings trying to get back to the majors after an injury or a rough patch, and the guys just playing a few more seasons because someone still wants them and they still want to.

Most, if not all, of the players on an MLB team's expanded roster who are not currently on the team's active roster are assigned to the team's Triple-A club. Expanded rosters consist of 40 players, while active rosters generally consist of 26 players as of the 2021 season. Most Triple-A teams are located geographically close to their MLB parent club, as activating a Triple-A player as an injury replacement is a common occurrence.

The term "AAAA player," pronounced "four-A" or "quadruple-A," refers to a player who is consistently successful when playing for Triple-A teams, but is not successful at the major league level. The term is usually used derisively and has itself been criticized as flawed. Major league team executives and managers disagree whether AAAA players exist.

== Leagues ==
Teams at this level are divided into two leagues: the International League and the Pacific Coast League. The International League fields teams primarily in the Eastern United States, while the Pacific Coast League fields teams mostly in the Western United States. Each of the 30 major league teams has an affiliation with one Triple-A team in the United States.

== Current teams ==
Current Triple-A team locations:
International League
Pacific Coast League

=== International League ===
Division	Team	Founded	MLB affiliation	Affiliated	City	Stadium	Capacity
East	Buffalo Bisons	1979	Toronto Blue Jays	2013	Buffalo, New York	Sahlen Field	16,600
East	Charlotte Knights	1976	Chicago White Sox	1999	Charlotte, North Carolina	Truist Field	10,200
East	Durham Bulls	1902	Tampa Bay Rays	1998	Durham, North Carolina	Durham Bulls Athletic Park	10,000
East	Jacksonville Jumbo Shrimp	1962	Miami Marlins	2021	Jacksonville, Florida	VyStar Ballpark	11,000
East	Lehigh Valley IronPigs	2008	Philadelphia Phillies	2007	Allentown, Pennsylvania	Coca-Cola Park	10,100
East	Norfolk Tides	1961	Baltimore Orioles	2007	Norfolk, Virginia	Harbor Park	11,856
East	Rochester Red Wings	1899	Washington Nationals	2021	Rochester, New York	ESL Ballpark	10,840
East	Scranton/Wilkes-Barre Highlanders	1989	New York Yankees	2007	Moosic, Pennsylvania	PNC Field	10,000
East	Syracuse Mets	1934	New York Mets	2019	Syracuse, New York	NBT Bank Stadium	10,815
East	Worcester Red Sox	2021	Boston Red Sox	2021	Worcester, Massachusetts	Polar Park	9,508
West	Columbus Clippers	1977	Cleveland Guardians	2009	Columbus, Ohio	Huntington Park	10,100
West	Gwinnett Stripers	2009	Atlanta Braves	2009	Lawrenceville, Georgia	Gwinnett Field	10,427
West	Indianapolis Indians	1902	Pittsburgh Pirates	2005	Indianapolis, Indiana	Victory Field	13,750
West	Iowa Cubs	1969	Chicago Cubs	1981	Des Moines, Iowa	Principal Park	11,500
West	Louisville Bats	1982	Cincinnati Reds	2000	Louisville, Kentucky	Louisville Slugger Field	13,131
West	Memphis Redbirds	1998	St. Louis Cardinals	1998	Memphis, Tennessee	AutoZone Park	10,000
West	Nashville Sounds	1978	Milwaukee Brewers	2021	Nashville, Tennessee	First Horizon Park	10,000
West	Omaha Storm Chasers	1969	Kansas City Royals	1969	Papillion, Nebraska	Werner Park	9,023
West	St. Paul Saints	1993	Minnesota Twins	2021	Saint Paul, Minnesota	CHS Field	7,210
West	Toledo Mud Hens	1965	Detroit Tigers	1987	Toledo, Ohio	Fifth Third Field	10,300

=== Pacific Coast League ===
Division	Team	Founded	MLB affiliation	Affiliated	City	Stadium	Capacity
East	Albuquerque Isotopes	2003	Colorado Rockies	2015	Albuquerque, New Mexico	Rio Grande Credit Union Field at Isotopes Park	13,500
East	El Paso Chihuahuas	2014	San Diego Padres	2014	El Paso, Texas	Southwest University Park	9,500
East	Oklahoma City Comets	1962	Los Angeles Dodgers	2015	Oklahoma City, Oklahoma	Chickasaw Bricktown Ballpark	9,000
East	Round Rock Express	2000	Texas Rangers	2021	Round Rock, Texas	Dell Diamond	11,631
East	Sugar Land Space Cowboys	2012	Houston Astros	2021	Sugar Land, Texas	Constellation Field	7,500
West	Las Vegas Aviators	1983	Athletics	2019	Summerlin South, Nevada	Las Vegas Ballpark	10,000
West	Reno Aces	2009	Arizona Diamondbacks	2009	Reno, Nevada	Greater Nevada Field	9,013
West	Sacramento River Cats	2000	San Francisco Giants	2015	West Sacramento, California	Sutter Health Park	14,014
West	Salt Lake Bees	1994	Los Angeles Angels	2001	South Jordan, Utah	The Ballpark at America First Square	6,500
West	Tacoma Rainiers	1960	Seattle Mariners	1995	Tacoma, Washington	Cheney Stadium	6,500

== Triple-A All-Star Game ==
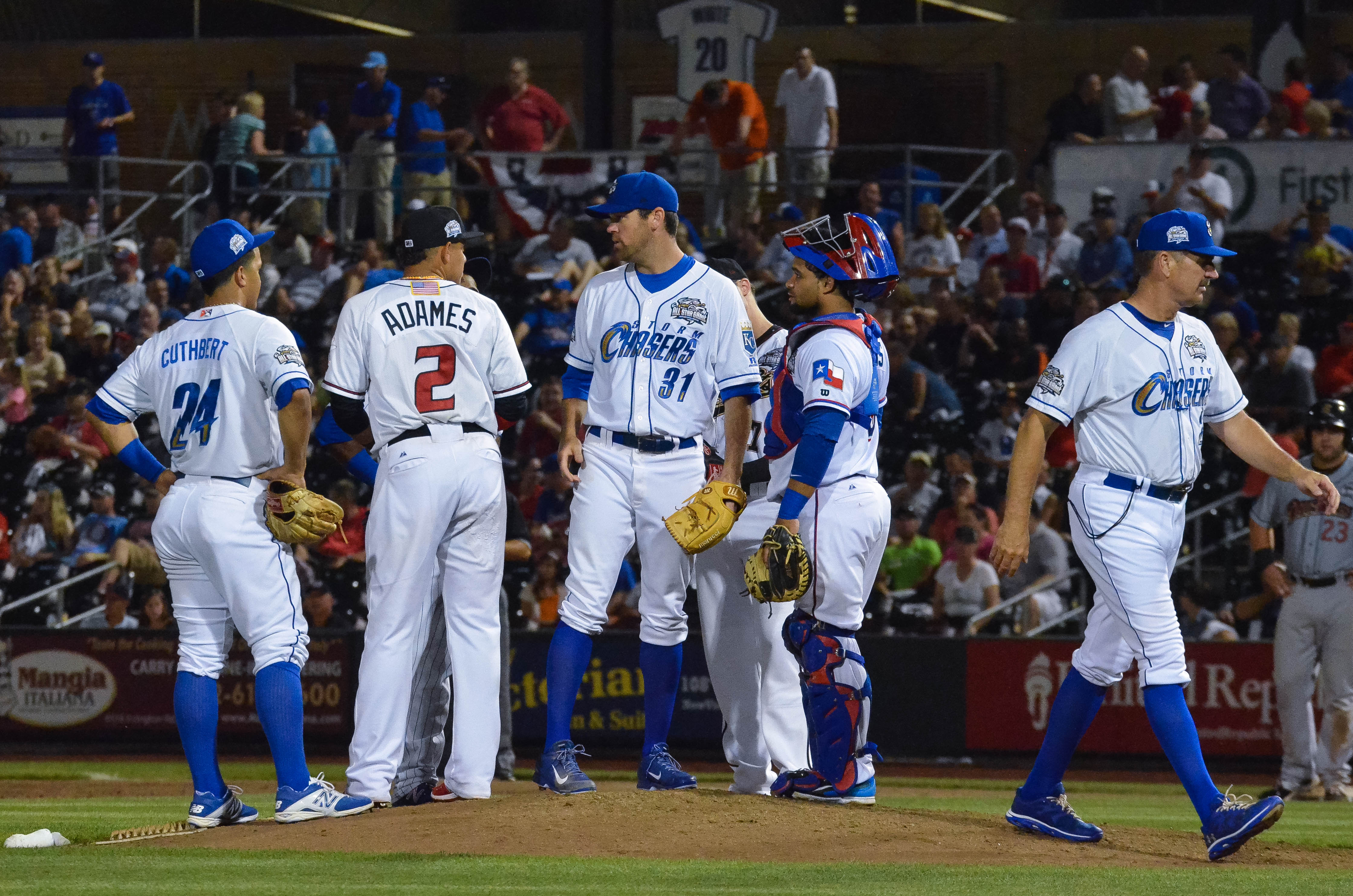
The 2015 Pacific Coast League Triple-A All-Stars

The Triple-A All-Star Game was a single game held between the two affiliated Triple-A leagues—the International League and the Pacific Coast League. Each league fielded a team composed of the top players in their respective leagues as voted on by fans, the media, and each club's field manager and general manager. The event took place every year since 1988 when the first Triple-A All-Star Game was played in Buffalo, New York. Prior to 1998, a team of American League-affiliated Triple-A All-Stars faced off against a team of National League-affiliated Triple-A All-Stars.

Traditionally, the game was held on the day after the mid-summer Major League Baseball All-Star Game. Such games mark a symbolic halfway-point in the season, despite occurring later than the actual halfway-point of most seasons. Both Triple-A leagues shared a common All-Star break, with no regular-season games scheduled for two days before the All-Star Game itself. Some additional events, such as the All-Star Fan Fest and Triple-A Home Run Derby, were held each year during this break in the regular season.

While the 2021 schedule originally included a three-day All-Star break of July 12–14, this was removed after Opening Day was pushed back one month. Team schedules for the 2021 season were subsequently issued without an All-Star break.

== Triple-A Championship ==
Beginning in 2006, the annual Triple-A National Championship Game was held to serve as a single championship game between the champions of the International League and Pacific Coast League to determine an overall champion of Triple-A baseball. It was originally held annually at Chickasaw Bricktown Ballpark in Oklahoma City, and known as the Bricktown Showdown. Starting in 2011, the game was held in a different Triple-A city each year. Previous postseason interleague championships include the Junior World Series (1932–34, 1936–62, 1970–71, 1973–74), Triple-A World Series (1983, 1998–2000), and Triple-A Classic (1988–91).

For the 2021 season, in place of the National Championship Game, Minor League Baseball extended the Triple-A regular season to October 3, with league champions determined based on regular-season records through the original end date of the season (September 19 for Triple-A East, and September 21 for Triple-A West). The final 10 games of the season, played after those dates, were deemed the "Final Stretch", with the team posting the best winning percentage during that period (the Durham Bulls, who went 9–1) winning a cash prize. Since the 2022 season, the Triple-A National Championship Game has been played between the champions of the International League and the Pacific Coast League. In 2023, the Triple-A Championship game was played at the Las Vegas Ballpark. The winner of this game were the Norfolk Tides.

== Pace-of-play initiatives ==
As a part of professional baseball's pace of play initiatives implemented in 2015, 20-second pitch clocks entered use at Triple-A stadiums in 2015. In 2018, the time was shortened to 15 seconds when no runners are on base. Other significant changes implemented in 2018 included beginning extra innings with a runner on second base and limiting teams to six mound visits during a nine-inning game. For the 2019 season, the number of mound visits was reduced to five, and pitchers were required to face a minimum of three consecutive batters unless the side is retired or the pitcher becomes injured and is unable to continue playing.
