= List of defunct baseball teams in Canada =

The following is a list of defunct baseball teams in Canada. It includes the league(s) they played for, and championships won.

== Major League Baseball ==
=== National League ===
Team	City	Existed	NL East Titles	National League Pennants	World Series Titles	Notes
Montreal Expos	Montreal, Quebec	1969–2004	1	0	0	Became the Washington Nationals in 2005

== Minor League Baseball ==
=== AAA ===
==== International League ====
Team	City	Existed	Ballpark	League titles	Notes	Affiliate
Hamilton Tigers	Hamilton, Ontario	1918		0	Moved from Syracuse, New York, mid-season	Independent
Montreal Royals	Montreal, Quebec	1928–1960	Delormier Stadium	7	Moved to Syracuse	Los Angeles Dodgers
Ottawa Giants	Ottawa, Ontario	1951	Lansdowne Park	0	Became the Ottawa A's after one season	New York Giants
Ottawa A's	Ottawa, Ontario	1952–1954	Lansdowne Park	0	Moved to Columbus, Ohio	Philadelphia Athletics
Ottawa Lynx	Ottawa, Ontario	1993–2007	Lynx Stadium	1	Moved to Allentown, Pennsylvania, for 2008 season.	Philadelphia Phillies
Toronto Maple Leafs	Toronto, Ontario	1912–1967	Maple Leaf Stadium	4	Founded in 1896; moved to Louisville, Kentucky, in 1968	Boston Red Sox
Winnipeg Whips	Winnipeg, Manitoba	1970–1971	Winnipeg Stadium	0	Moved from Buffalo midway through 1970 season	Montreal Expos

==== Pacific Coast League ====
Team	City	Existed	Ballpark	League titles	Notes	Affiliate
Calgary Cannons	Calgary, Alberta	1985–2002	Foothills Stadium	0	Became the Albuquerque Isotopes in 2003	Florida Marlins
Edmonton Trappers	Edmonton, Alberta	1981–2004	Telus Field	4	Became the Round Rock Express in 2005	Montreal Expos
Vancouver Mounties	Vancouver, British Columbia	1956–1962, 1965–1969	Capilano Stadium	0		Seattle Pilots
Vancouver Canadians	Vancouver, British Columbia	1978–1999	Nat Bailey Stadium	3	Became the Sacramento River Cats in 2000. Not to be confused with the current Vancouver Canadians that play in the High-A West League.	Oakland Athletics

=== AA ===
==== Eastern League ====
Team	City	Existed	Ballpark	League titles	Notes	Affiliate
London Tigers	London, Ontario	1989–1993	Labatt Park	1	Moved to Trenton, New Jersey	Detroit Tigers
Quebec Metros	Quebec City, Quebec	1971–1977	Stade Municipal	0	Known as the Carnivals 1971–1975	Montreal Expos
Sherbrooke Pirates	Sherbrooke, Quebec	1972–1973	Amedee Roy Stadium	0		Pittsburgh Pirates
Trois-Rivières Aigles	Trois-Rivières, Quebec	1971–1977	Stade Municipal	0	Not to be confused with the current team of the same name in the independent Can-Am League.	Cincinnati Reds
Thetford Mines Pirates	Thetford Mines, Quebec	1974–1975	Bellevue Stadium	1	Moved from Sherbrooke (above)	Milwaukee Brewers

=== A ===
==== New York–Penn League ====
Team	City	Existed	Ballpark	League titles	Notes	Affiliate
Hamilton Red Wings	Hamilton, Ontario	1939–1942		0		St. Louis Cardinals
Hamilton Cardinals	Hamilton, Ontario	1946–1956		1	Known as the Red Wings in 1956	St. Louis Cardinals
Hamilton Redbirds	Hamilton, Ontario	1988–1992	Bernie Arbour Memorial Stadium	0		St. Louis Cardinals
London Pirates	London, Ontario	1940–1941	Labatt Park	0		Pittsburgh Pirates
St. Catharines Stompers	St. Catharines, Ontario	1986–1999	Community Park	1	Also known as the Blue Jays	Toronto Blue Jays
Welland Pirates	Welland, Ontario	1989–1994	Welland Stadium	0		Pittsburgh Pirates

==== Northwest League ====
Team	City	Existed	League titles	Notes	Affiliate
New Westminster Frasers	New Westminster, British Columbia	1974	0		Independent
Victoria Mussels	Victoria, British Columbia	1978–1980	0		Independent

=== Rookie ===
==== Pioneer League ====
Team	City	Existed	League titles	Notes	Affiliate
Calgary Expos	Calgary, Alberta	1977–1984	0	Known as the Cardinals 1977–78	Montreal Expos
Lethbridge Dodgers	Lethbridge, Alberta	1975–1983	3	Known as the Expos 1975–76	Los Angeles Dodgers
Lethbridge Black Diamonds	Lethbridge, Alberta	1992–1998	0	Known as the Mounties 1992–1995	Arizona Diamondbacks
Medicine Hat Blue Jays	Medicine Hat, Alberta	1977–2002	1	Known as the A's 1977	Toronto Blue Jays

== Independent baseball ==
=== Can-Am League ===
Team	City	Existed	League titles	Notes
Ottawa Champions	Ottawa, Ontario	2014–2020	1	
Ottawa Rapidz	Ottawa, Ontario	2008	0	

=== Canadian Baseball League ===
Team	City	Existed	League titles	Notes
Calgary Outlaws	Calgary, Alberta	2003	1	
Kelowna Heat	Kelowna, British Columbia	2003	0	
London Monarchs	London, Ontario	2003	0	
Montreal Royales	Montreal, Quebec	2003	0	Road-only team
Niagara Stars	Welland, Ontario	2003	0	
Saskatoon Legends	Saskatoon, Saskatchewan	2003	0	
Trois-Rivières Saints	Trois-Rivières, Quebec	2003	0	
Victoria Capitals	Victoria, British Columbia	2003	0	

=== Frontier League ===
Team	City	Existed	League titles	Notes
London Rippers	London, Ontario	2012	0	Folded during 2012 season
London Werewolves	London, Ontario	1999–2001	1	

=== Golden Baseball League ===
Team	City	Existed	League titles	Notes
Victoria Seals	Victoria, British Columbia	2009–10	0	

=== Northern League ===
Team	City	Existed	League titles	Notes
Thunder Bay Whiskey Jacks	Thunder Bay, Ontario	1993–1998	0	Moved to Schaumburg, Illinois, in 1999 and became the Schaumburg Flyers.

=== North American League ===
Team	City	Existed	League titles	Notes
Calgary Vipers	Calgary, Alberta	2005–11	1	Moved from the Northern League to the Golden Baseball League on October 23, 2007, then to the North American League in 2011. Folded following the 2011 season.
Edmonton Capitals	Edmonton, Alberta	2005–2012	1	Moved from the Northern League to the Golden Baseball League on October 23, 2007, then to the North American League in 2011. Suspended operations on February 21, 2012. Known as the Cracker-Cats from 2005 until 2009.

=== North Central League ===
Team	City	Existed	League titles	Notes
Regina Cyclones	Regina, Saskatchewan	1994	0	
Saskatoon Riot	Saskatoon, Saskatchewan	1994	0	

=== Prairie League Of Professional Baseball ===
Team	City	Existed	League titles	Notes
Moose Jaw Diamond Dogs	Moose Jaw, Saskatchewan	1995–1997	0	
Regina Cyclones	Regina, Saskatchewan	1995–1997	1	
Saskatoon Stallions	Saskatoon, Saskatchewan	1995–1997	0	Entered league as the Saskatoon Riot; changed name to Smokin' Guns in 1996 and to Stallions in 1997
West Man Wranglers	Brandon, Manitoba	1995–1997	0	Entered league as the Brandon Grey Owls; changed name to West Man Wranglers in 1997

=== Western Baseball League ===
Team	City	Existed	League titles	Notes
Surrey Glaciers	Surrey, British Columbia	1995	0	Moved to Reno, Nevada, and became the Reno Chukars.

== College Summer Baseball ==
=== Expedition League ===
Team	City	Existed	League titles	Notes
Wheat City Whiskey Jacks	Brandon, Manitoba	2019–2021	0	

=== Intercounty Baseball League ===
Team	City	Existed	League titles	Notes
Oshawa Dodgers	Oshawa, Ontario	2002–2009	0	

=== Western Major Baseball League ===
Team	City	Existed	League titles	Notes
Melville Millionaires	Melville, Saskatchewan	1901–2021	1/2	
Red Deer Generals	Red Deer, Alberta	2007	0	
St. Albert Big River Prospects	St. Albert, Alberta	2005–2008	0	Known as Edmonton Big River Prospects 2005
Saskatoon Yellow Jackets	Saskatoon, Saskatchewan		0	
Sherwood Park Dukes	Sherwood Park, Alberta	2008	0	
Yorkton Cardinals	Yorkton, Saskatchewan	2004–2021	0	

== See also ==
- Canada national baseball team
- List of Major League Baseball players from Canada
- Pearson Cup
- United League: A planned third league of Major League Baseball that was formed in the early 1990s and was to have begun play in the late 1990s in Canada and the United States.
