= Cairns Field =

Stadium in Saskatoon, Saskatchewan

Coordinates: 52.111273°N 106.697089°W

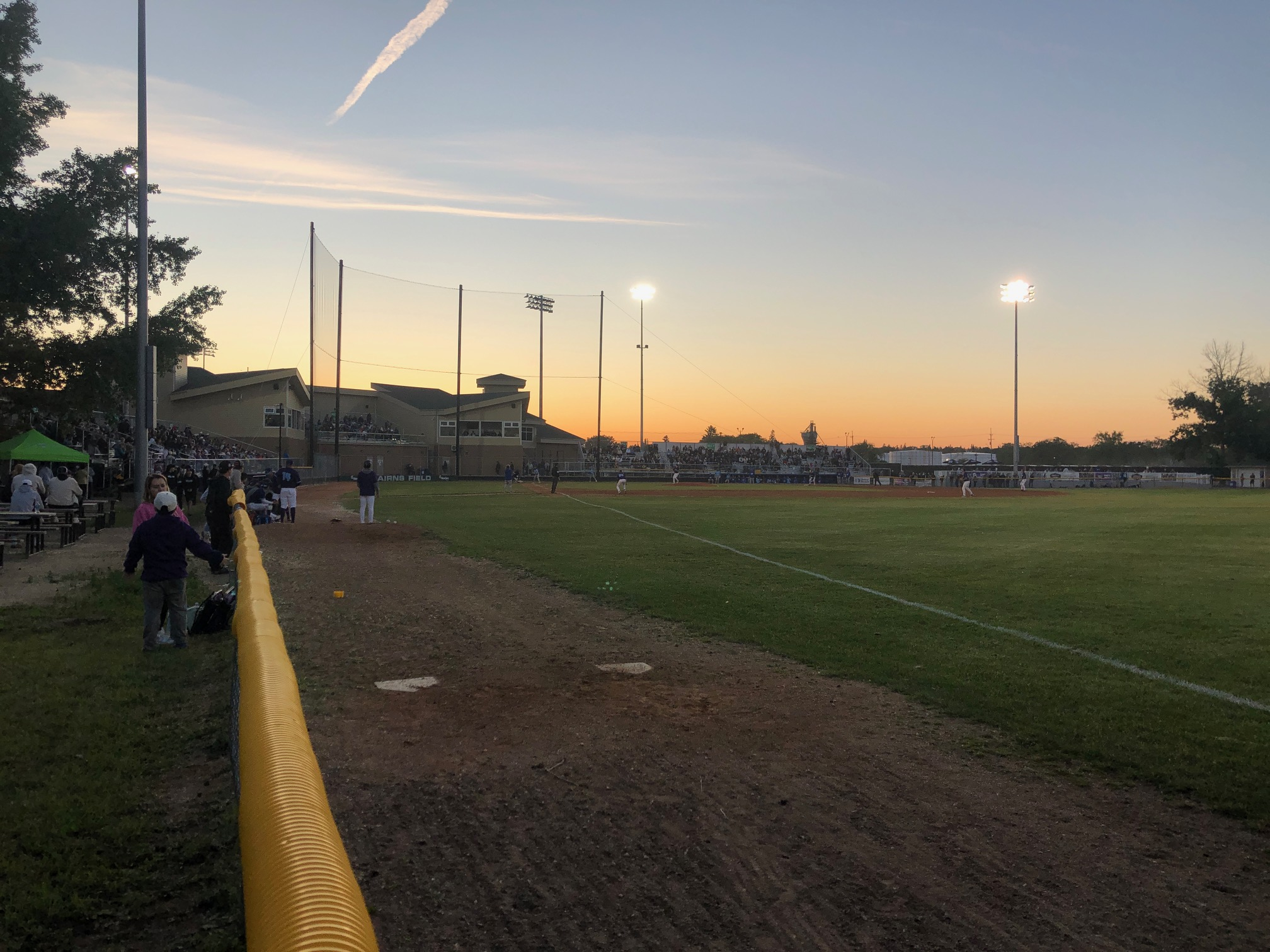
- Cairns Field in 2024
- Interactive map of Cairns Field
- Address: 1717 Dudley St, Saskatoon; Canada
- Location: Saskatoon, Saskatchewan.
- Owner: Gordie Howe Sports Complex
- Capacity: 2,000
- Field size: Left Field: 335 ft (102 m); Center Field: 400 ft 9 in (121.9 m); Right Field: 335 ft (102 m)

Tenants
- Saskatoon Berries (WCBL) (2024–present); Saskatoon Yellow Jackets (WCBL) (2002-2014); Saskatoon Legends (CBL) (2003); Saskatoon Stallions (PL) (1994-1997); Saskatoon Blues (WCBL) (1964); Saskatoon Commodores (NSBL) (1962); Saskatoon Ambassadors (NSBL) (1962); Saskatoon Commodores (CABL/WCBL) (1959); Saskatoon Commodores (WCBL) (1958, 1960-1961, 1963); Saskatoon Gems (SBL/WCBL) (1952-1957)

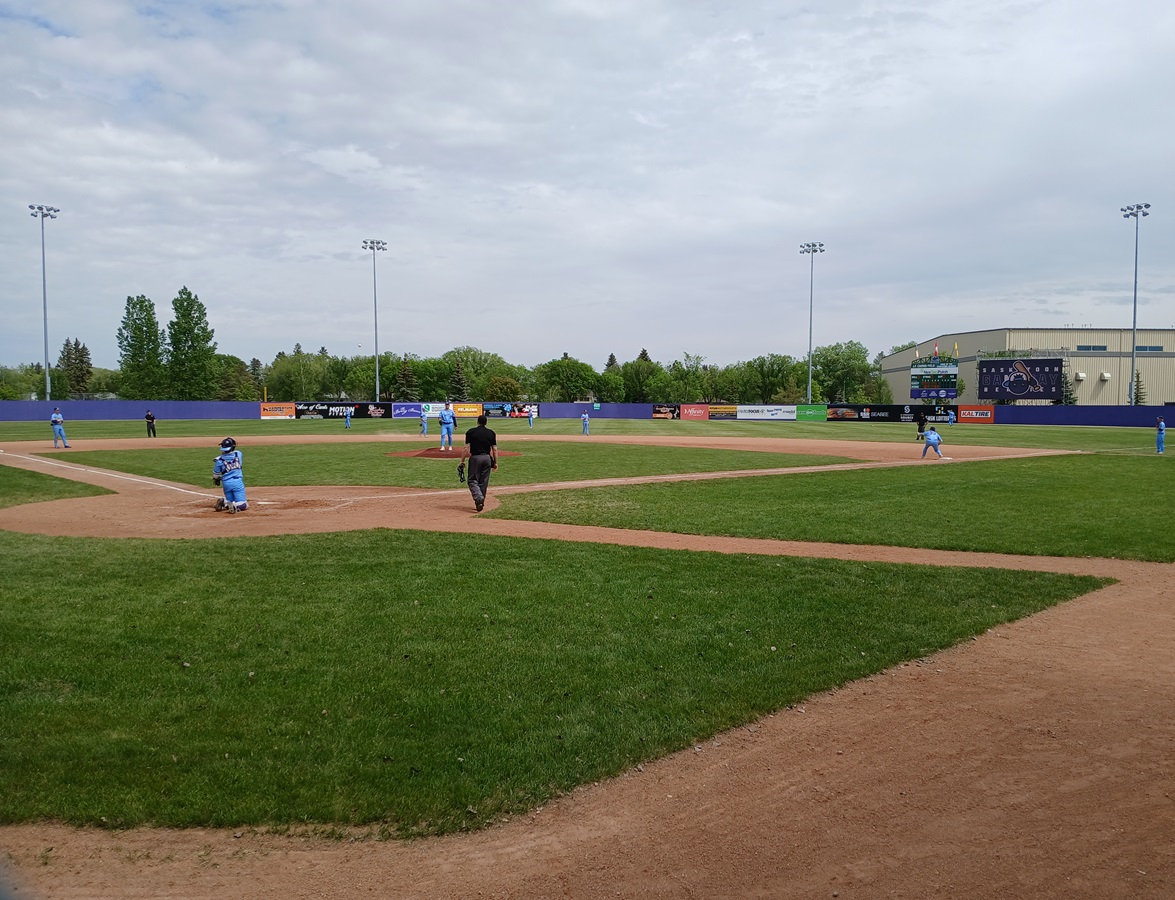
The Saskatoon Berries warming up at Cairns Field in June 2024.

Cairns Field (also known as NexGen Patch at Cairns Field) is a stadium in Saskatoon, Saskatchewan, Canada. It is primarily used for baseball and serves as the home of the Saskatoon Berries of the Western Canadian Baseball League as well as local baseball.

== Features ==
Cairns Field features artificial lighting, an electronic scoreboard, an irrigated and groomed grass infield, drainage, an 8-foot outfield fence with wind screening, and dimensions of 335 feet down each line and 400 feet in center field. The supporting facilities at the field include stands seating 2,000 fans, a clubhouse with four dressing rooms, concession, washrooms, showers, media press box with a public address system, an umpires' room, warm-up mounds, and a permanent batting cage.

== History ==
The original ballpark back in 1914 held a capacity of 1,700 which drew a total of 6,422 spectators for the city's entry into the Western Canada League. The original Cairns Field was situated near the Canadian Pacific Railways station named after James Frederick Cairns, who became the president of the Saskatoon Baseball Club in 1921. The former grandstand used in the current Cairns Field had been constructed for harness racing in the Pion-Era. The park had renovations during the 1980s, with additional renovations after the Berries became tennants in 2024.

The ballpark hosted for the 2005 Canadian National Junior Championships. It was home to the Saskatoon Yellow Jackets from 2002 until the team folded in 2014. When Saskatoon was awarded an expansion WCBL team in 2023, the team's ownership renovated the facilities, including adding a new video board and expanding seating. A sold-out crowd of 2,200 turned out for the first home game in Saskatoon Berries history on May 28, 2024.

== See also ==
- Sport in Saskatchewan
