= Saskatchewan International Raceway =

Drag racing facility in Saskatoon, Saskatchewan

Coordinates: 51.975655°N 106.544981°W

Saskatchewan International Raceway, also known as SIR, is a drag racing facility located 13 kilometers south of Saskatoon, Saskatchewan, Canada. The facility features a ¼ mile IHRA-sanctioned drag strip.

The track was originally built by Les Howard in 1966. The facility was purchased from Les in the 1990s by the Saskatchewan Drag Racing Association, a non-profit club which had been operating the track since the 1980s. In 2016 SIR was improved in areas including new asphalt from the concrete starting line to the second off-track return and the return road itself. More grandstands were added and other things were done for the SIR 50th Big Go to accommodate racers and spectators in August 2016.

Events run from May to September, and feature Friday night street legal racing, alcohol Funny Cars, altereds, nitro and jet cars, Test and Tune races, as well as SIR Points Series races where drivers compete toward the year-end championship.

== Gallery ==
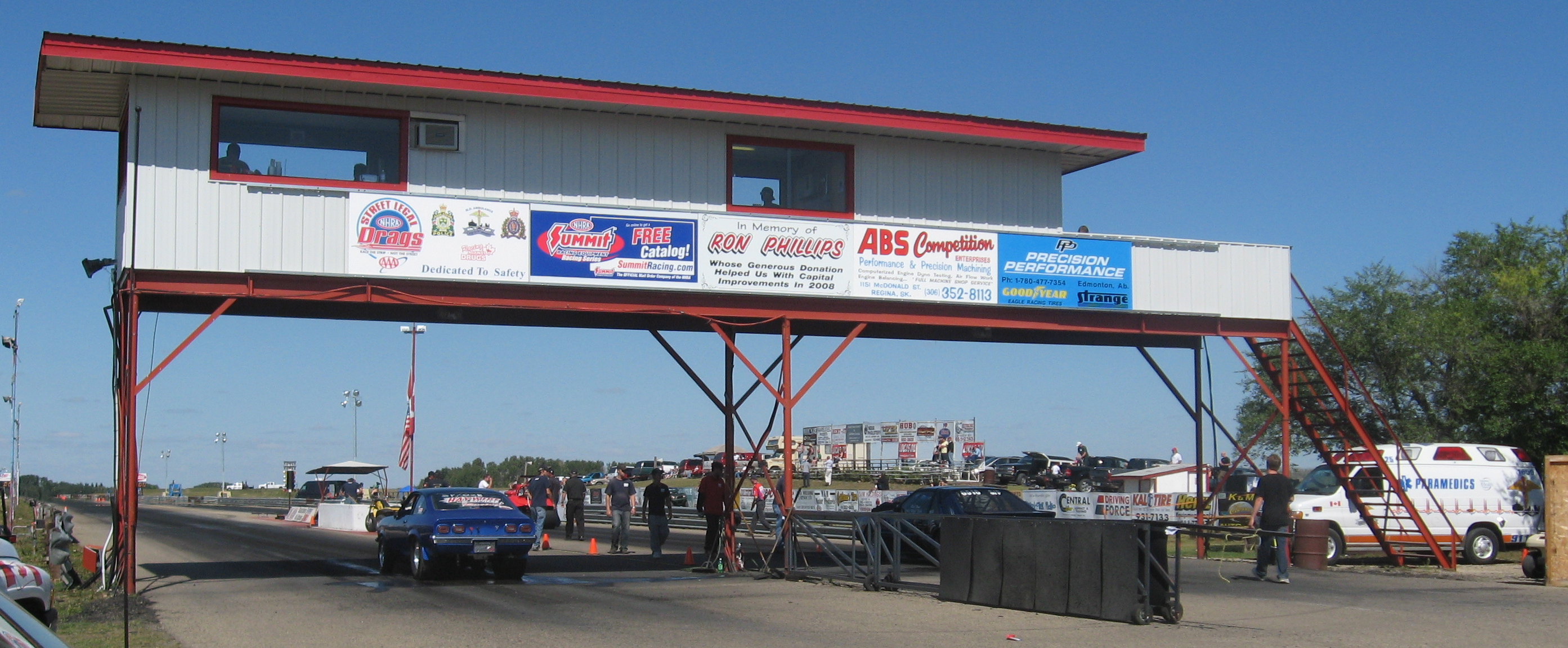
The tower, from trackside along the return road.

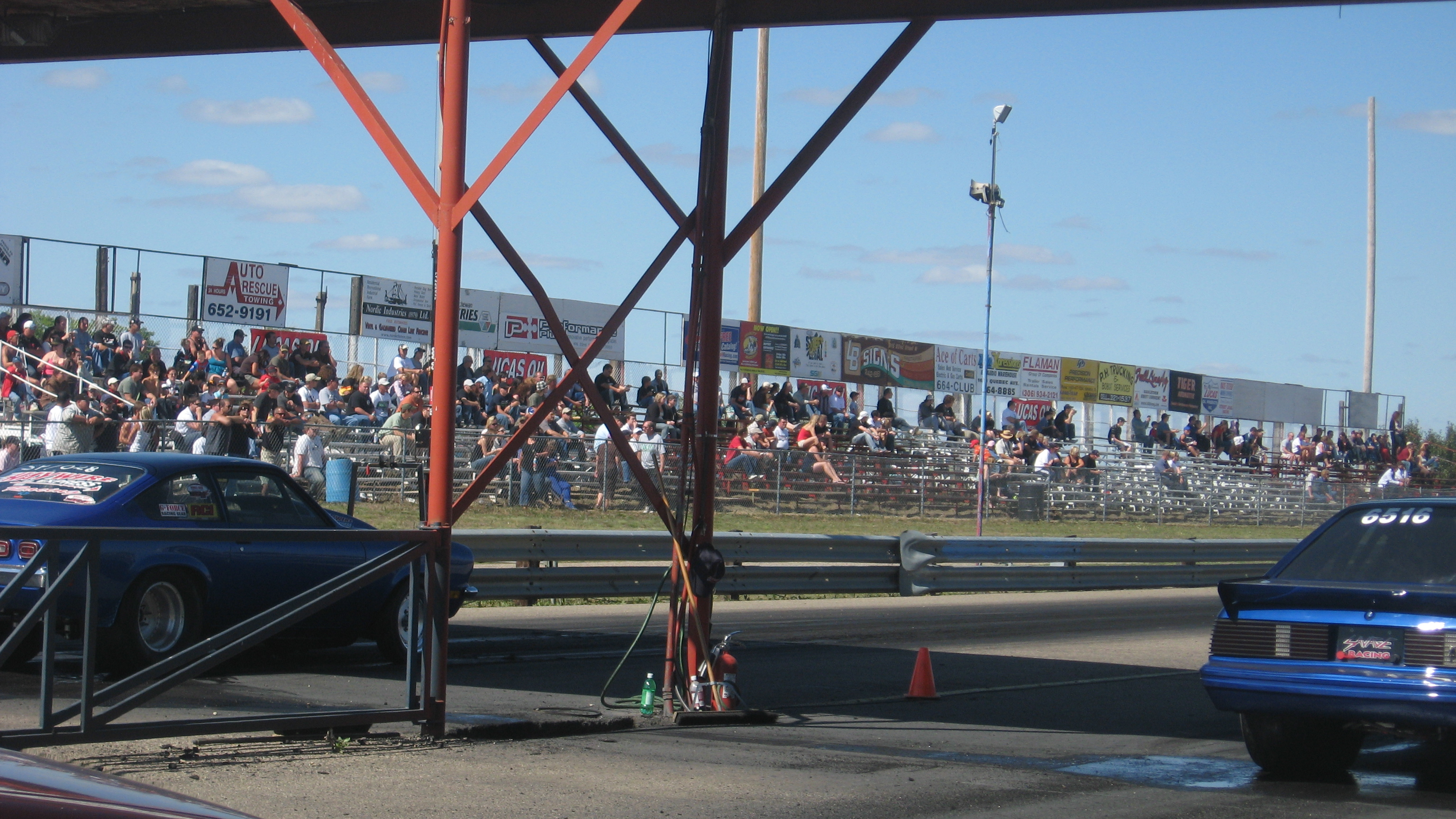
East bleachers, from the staging lanes.

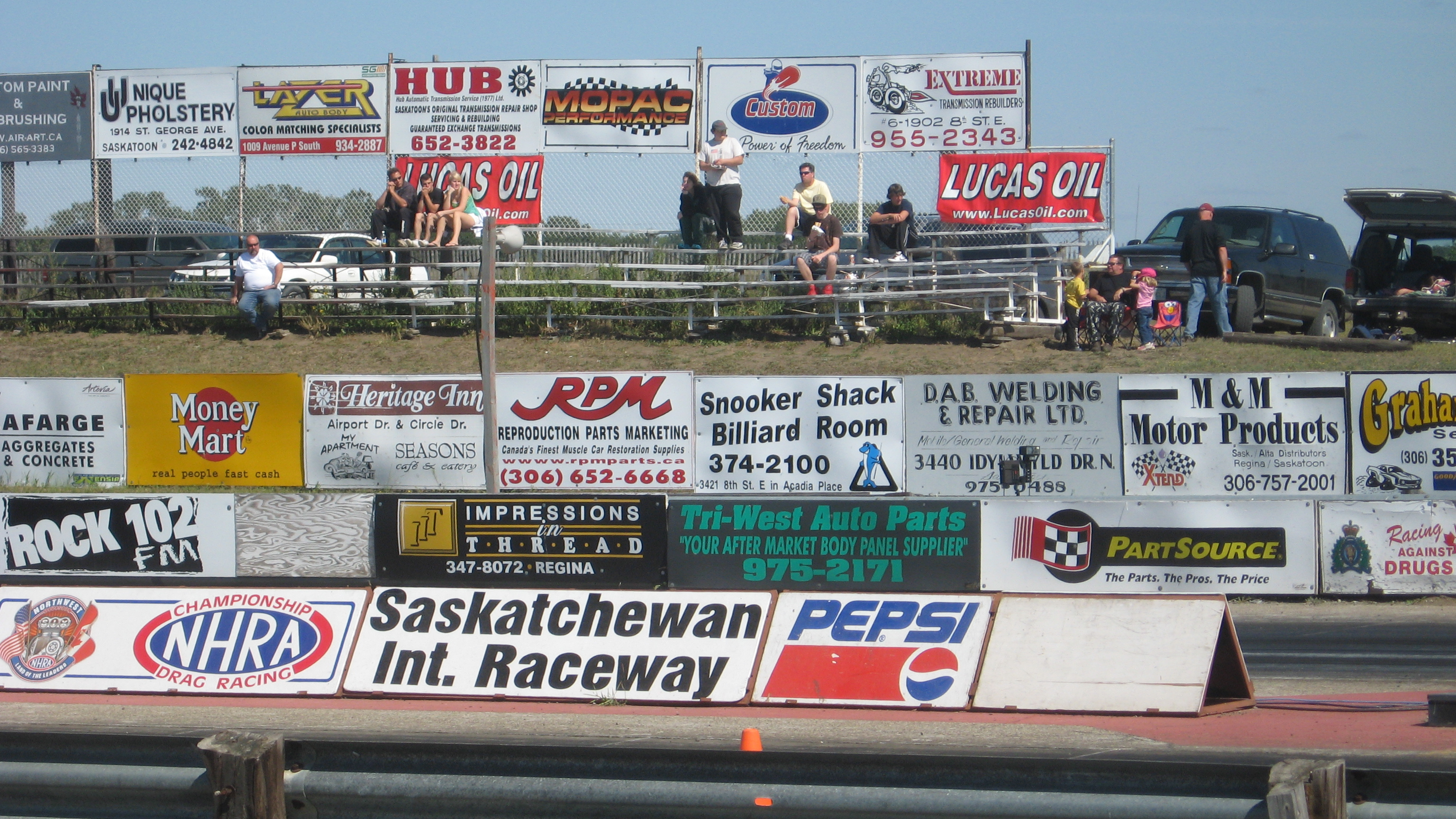
West bleachers, across the track.

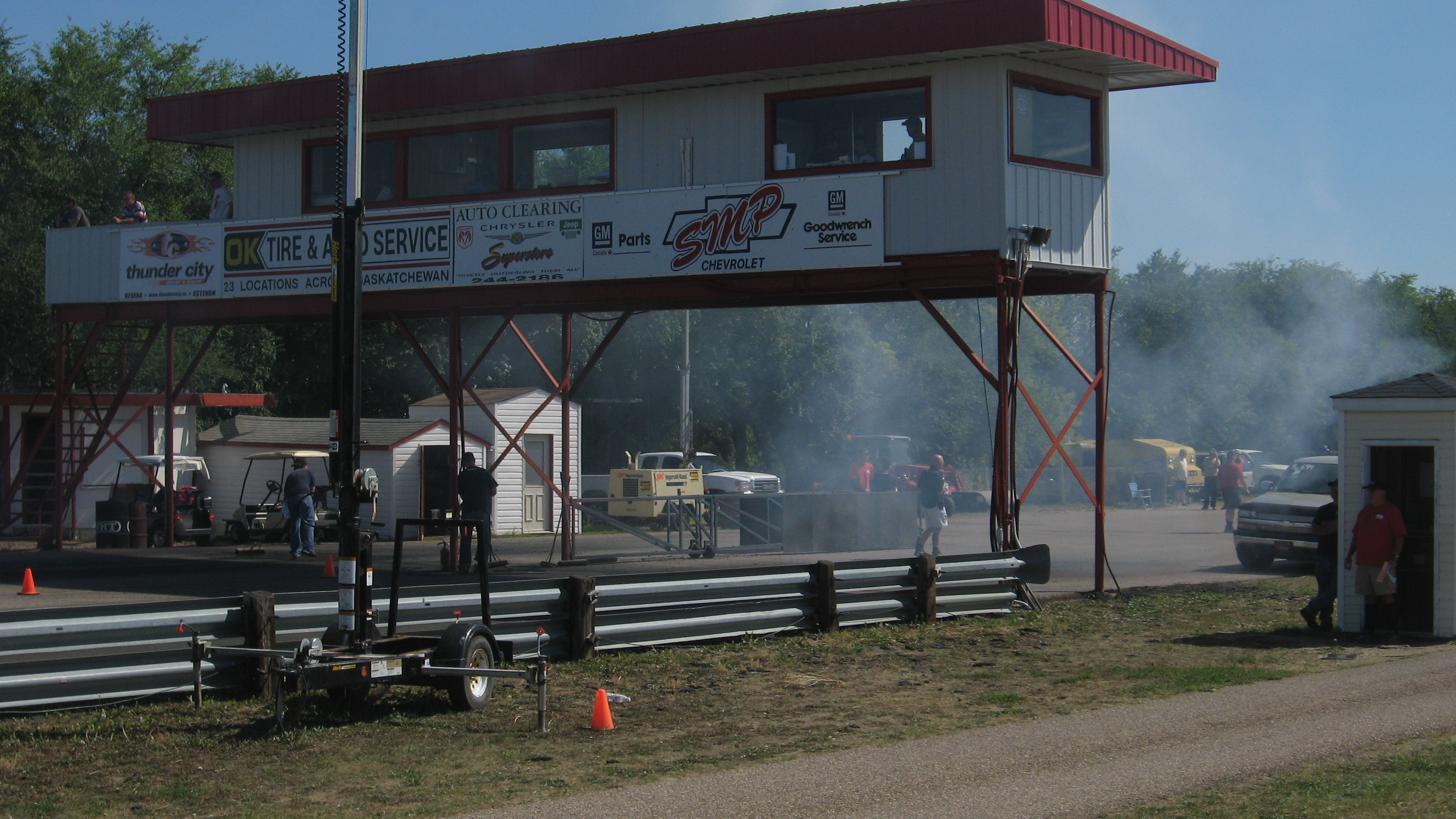
After a burnout; timer and timing booth at right

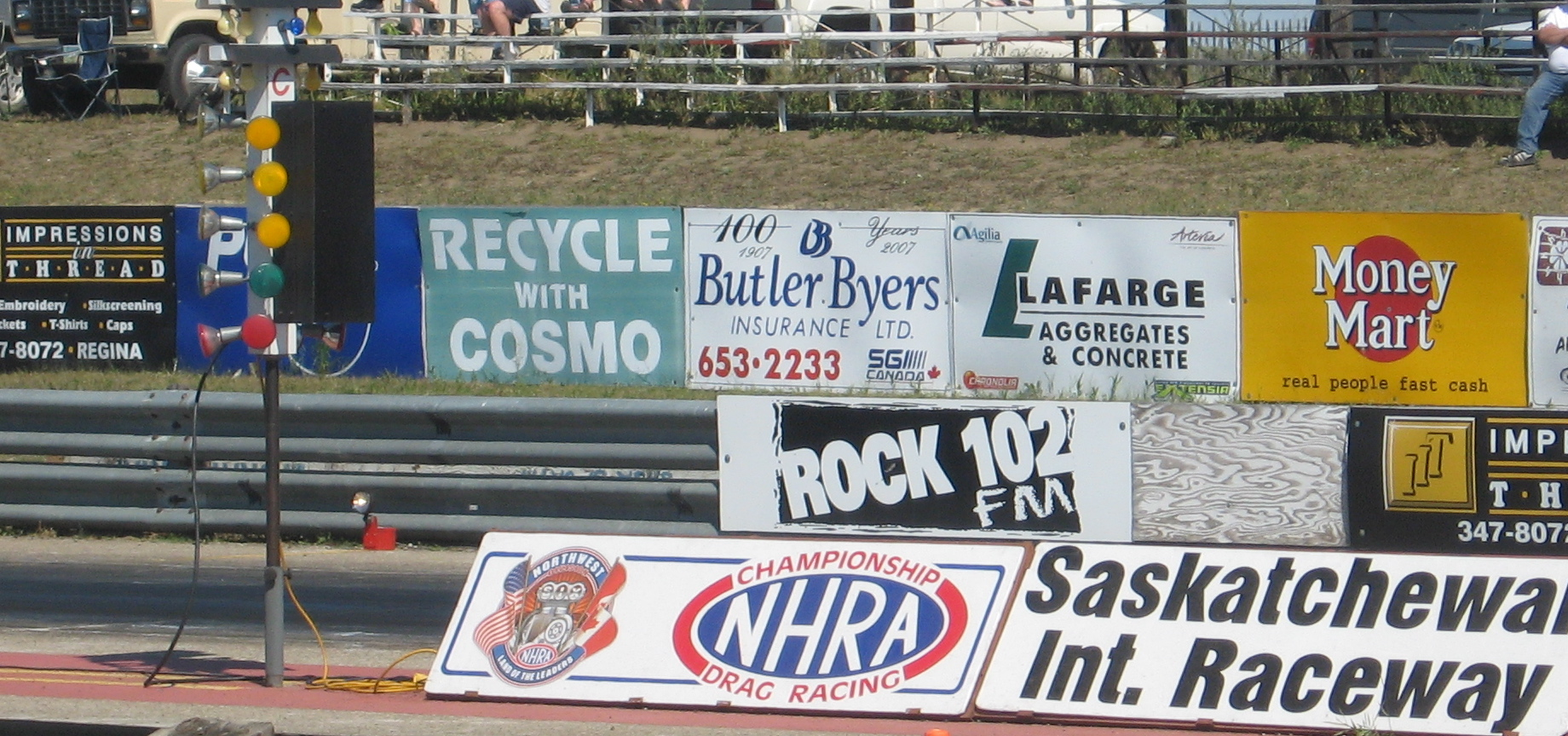
The tree in 2008. It has since been changed for an LED design.

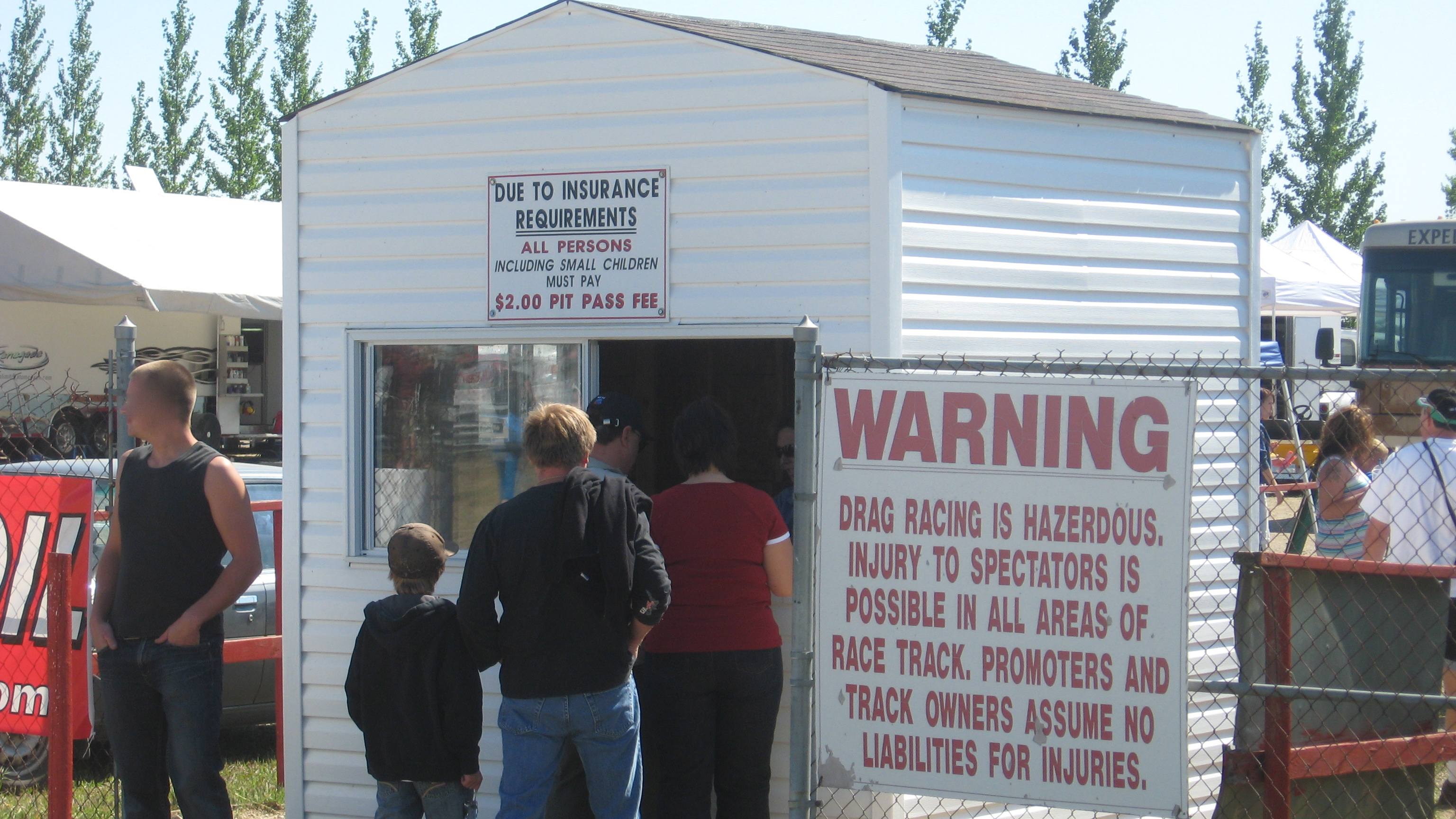
Purchasing pit passes
