= Saskatoon Legends =

Minor-league baseball team in Saskatoon, Saskatchewan

- Logo

Information
- League: Canadian Baseball League
- Location: Saskatoon, Saskatchewan
- Ballpark: Cairns Field
- Founded: 2003
- League championships: 0
- Division championships: 0
- Former name: Saskatoon Legends (2003)
- Colours: Black, Maroon, White
- General manager: Allan Koyanagi
- Manager: Ron LeFlore

The Saskatoon Legends were an independent minor league baseball team in the short-lived Canadian Baseball League. The team was based in Saskatoon, Saskatchewan and played home games at Cairns Field. Their only season of existence was 2003; the CBL folded midway through its first season of existence.

There were some notable members of the Legends. Among the young prospects, Iowa politician J. D. Scholten made his professional baseball debut with the Legends. Older players also joined the team, including former Montreal Expos pitcher Floyd Youmans. The team was managed by former MLB all-star Ron LeFlore.

The team was largely a success on the field, however that success did not translate into success with attendance. The team challenged the Calgary Outlaws for the West Division title, right up until the all-star break which occurred at the end of the season. They finished the abbreviated season with a 22–15 record, good for second place in the West Division behind the Calgary Outlaws.

== All-time roster ==
Name	Position	Height	Weight	Date of birth	Current/Last Known Team
Jonathan Aldridge	INF	5'10	150	10/20/1975	Saskatoon Legends (2003)
Henrry Alvarez	C	6'2	185	10/20/1979	Saskatoon Legends (2003)
Bobby Brown	OF	5'11	180	05/24/1974	Sioux City Explorers - Northern League (2006)
Derek Cockroft	P	6'4	225	11/23/1980	Australian Capital Territory Eagles - Australian Capital Territory A Grade League (2004)
Bienvenido Feliz (Note: The CBL mis-spelt his name Felix in all official releases)	P	6'1	210	06/04/1977	Newark Bears - Atlantic League (2005)
David Garcia	P	6'5	203	11/08/1980	Saskatoon Legends (2003)
Craig Kilshaw	P	6'3	195	02/14/1980	Saskatoon Legends (2003)
Joe Kirby	INF	6'0	180	03/23/1979	Brock University Badgers - Ontario University Athletics (2007)
Ryan Koback	P	6'6	245	12/31/1981	Saskatoon Yellow Jackets - Western Major Baseball League (2006)
Javier Lorenzo	P	6'0	168	12/26/1978	Saskatoon Legends (2003)
Alejandro Martínez	INF	6'1	215	05/22/1977	Laredo Broncos - United League (2009)
Sean Murphy	INF	5'10	180	05/03/1972	Elmira Pioneers - Northeast League (2003)
Jose Olmeda	INF	6'1	170	07/07/1977	Edinburg Coyotes - United League (2006)
Darwin Peguero	P	6'0	192	12/05/1978	Newark Bears - Atlantic League (2005)
Frankie Perez	OF	5'11	185	10/26/1978	Saskatoon Legends (2003)
J. D. Scholten	P	6'6	228	03/04/1980	Sioux City Explorers - American Association (2007)
Chris Seaton	P	6'0	195	09/22/1978	Schaumburg Flyers - Northern League (2003)
Hirotaka Shimizu	OF	5'11	172	01/18/1978	Sichuan Dragons - Chinese Baseball League (2006)
Matt Teahen	INF	6'0	210	02/27/1979	Mid-Missouri Mavericks - Frontier League (2004)
Angel Tovar	P	6'4	195	04/25/1978	Olmecas de Tabasco - Mexican League (2007)
Carlos Urquiola (Note: The CBL mis-spelt his last name Uraviola in all official releases.)	INF	5'8	150	04/22/1980	Ceci & Negri Parma - Serie A1, Italy (2005)
Ben Van Iderstine	OF	6'2	200	01/20/1978	Sioux Falls Canaries - American Association (2009)
Kenny White	P	6'1	170	11/27/1978	Gary Railcats - Northern League (2004)
Floyd Youmans	P	6'1	190	05/11/1964	Saskatoon Legends (2003)
