= Saskatoon Stallions =

- Logo

Information
- League: Prairie League (Canadian/Northern)
- Location: Saskatoon, Saskatchewan
- Ballpark: Cairns Field
- Founded: 1994
- Disbanded: 1997
- Former name(s): Saskatoon Riot (1994-1995); Saskatoon Smokin' Guns (1996)

The Saskatoon Stallions were a minor league baseball team that played in the Prairie League. The team was based in Saskatoon, Saskatchewan, and played its games at Cairns Field. The team folded along with the league after the 1997 season. The team frequently changed ownership and names; it was earlier known as the Saskatoon Riot and the Saskatoon Smokin' Guns.

== Team history ==
The team was founded as the Saskatoon Riot, a charter member of the North Central League in 1994. In 1995, the team moved to the new Prairie League, joining the Regina Cyclones, Moose Jaw Diamond Dogs, and Brandon Grey Owls in the Canadian Division.

In 1996, the team was sold to new ownership and changed its name to the Saskatoon Smokin' Guns, selected through a fan contest. In 1997, the team was sold once again. Cyclones member Daryl Boston pursued the team, but it was ultimately sold to a group of American investors, who changed the team name again, this time to the Stallions. The Prairie League folded after the 1997 season due to financial difficulties.

After the team folded, local baseball builder Dan Asham purchased the uniforms to start a Saskatoon midget team. One year later, he moved the team to the Saskatoon Senior Baseball League (SSBL). That team has gone on to win numerous championships, including three SSBL Championships (2007, 2011, and 2012). The Smokin' Guns name has also been revived, and a team by that name represented Saskatchewan at the 2015 senior men's national championship in Chatham, New Brunswick.

== Season-by-season record ==
Season	League	W	L
1994 *	North Central League	32	38
1995 *	Prairie League	26	45
1996 **	Prairie League	30	47
1997	Prairie League	38	28

*As Saskatoon Riot

**As Saskatoon Smokin' Guns

== See also ==
- List of baseball teams in Canada
