= Saskatoon Yellow Jackets =

Information
- League: Western Major Baseball League (Central Division)
- Location: Saskatoon, Saskatchewan
- Ballpark: Cairns Field
- Founded: 2002
- Folded: 2014
- Nickname: Jackets
- Colours

The Saskatoon Yellow Jackets were a baseball team that played in Saskatoon, Saskatchewan. The team was a member of the Western Major Baseball League, a collegiate summer baseball league operating in the prairie provinces of Canada. The team joined the league in 2002, but struggled financially throughout its existence and folded in 2014.

== Team history ==
The Yellow Jackets began play out of Cairns Field in 2002. The team changed ownership multiple times and struggled with fan engagement. The team also struggled on the field, and missed the playoffs for six straight seasons from 2009 to 2014, finishing at the bottom of the Central division each of those years. The team folded in 2014. This left Saskatoon without a WMBL team until the city was awarded an expansion franchise, the Saskatoon Berries, in 2024.

In August 2017, two former Yellow Jackets dressed for the Seattle Mariners, marking the first time that two WMBL players dressed for the same Major League Baseball team. Andrew Albers, from North Battleford, pitched five innings on 15 August, while Marco Gonzales took the mound on 16 August.

== Season-by-season record ==
Year	League	Division	Finish	Wins	Losses	Win%	GB	Postseason
2009	Western Major Baseball League	Central	3rd	15	25	.375	12	Did not qualify
2010	WMBL	Central	3rd	12	29	.293	18	Did not qualify
2011	WMBL	Central	3rd	14	28	.333	12	Did not qualify
2012	WMBL	Central	3rd	20	26	.435	8	Did not qualify
2013	WMBL	Central	3rd	18	26	.409	11	Did not qualify
2014	WMBL	Central	3rd	20	26	.435	8	Did not qualify

== See also ==
- List of defunct baseball teams in Canada
