= Camp Naivelt =

Jewish camping community in Ontario, Canada

Coordinates: 43.6447°N 79.7834°W

Camp Naivelt (Yiddish: קעמפּ נײַוועלט, lit. 'Camp New World') is a left-wing secular Jewish camping community in Brampton, Ontario, founded in 1925 as a children's summer camp, Camp Kindervelt (Yiddish: קעמפּ קינדערוועלט). It is affiliated with the United Jewish People's Order.

== Early years ==
The camp was established as Kindervelt, a children's camp, in 1925 by the pro-Bolshevik Jewish Women's Labour League, the women's auxiliary of the Jewish Labour League Mutual Benefit Society. They leased some property at Eldorado Mills along the Credit River, initially owned by the Canadian National Railway. In 1936 the League attempted to purchase about 103 acres (0.42 km^{2}) of the property. The CNR was openly resistant to selling to Jewish organizations, posting vicious anti-Semitic signs at the entrance to discourage the land purchase. However, the property was acquired through an individual not directly linked to the League and then transferred to them. The camp was referred to as a "Worker's Children Camp" and promoted Jewish culture and radical leftist and socialist political ideals. Jewish folklore, the Yiddish language, music, folk art and dance were studied at the camp.

The United Jewish Peoples' Order (UJPO) was founded in 1945 through a merger of the Labour League and other radical Jewish organizations and has operated and managed the camp ever since. When purchased the camp contained a merry-go-round and a meeting hall from the early years of Eldorado Park. Initially only tents were used for the campers. Later permanent frame cottages clad in insulbrick or clapboard were constructed. In the 1940s the UJPO built a band shell, boathouse, swimming pool and two bridges over the Credit River.

Canadian Communist Party leader Tim Buck was a frequent speaker at the camp, and the Royal Canadian Mounted Police monitored activities and goings-on there from time to time through the late 1940s and 1950s. The Mounties were known to 'stake out' the park entrance, recording license plate numbers of those entering for public events.

At its peak in the 1930s to 1950s, Camp Kinderland served up to 300 children each summer. The camp later became a popular destination for working-class, urban Jews. The children's camp remained in operation as an overnight camp until 1962 and as a day camp until 1971. A family-oriented adult campground that was used mostly on weekends and holidays developed adjacent to the children's camp that, at its peak, contained some 90 cottages as well as room for tents. In the 1970s the present Eldorado Park was established when a portion of Camp Naivelt was sold to the City of Brampton.

== Contributions to music ==
Camp Naivelt was instrumental in promoting folk music in Canada in the 1960s. Notable alumni include Eddie Schwartz, Estelle Klein, Zal Yanovsky, and Sharon Hampson. The founding members of The Travellers met as children at Camp Naivelt and formed the group there.

American folk singer Pete Seeger performed at Camp Naivelt on several occasions from the 1940s to the 1980s, sometimes with The Almanac Singers. Other visitors to the camp included Paul Robeson and folk singer Phil Ochs.

In 2010 Brampton City Council passed a heritage designation bylaw under the Ontario Heritage Act, recognizing Camp Naivelt's significant cultural heritage value. Camp Naivelt's historical and cultural associations are documented in the Heritage Designation report. York University's Clara Thomas Archives & Special Collections has extensive photographic material on Camp Naivelt from the Sam and Manya Lipshitz fonds.

== See also ==
- Morris Winchevsky School
- Toronto Jewish Folk Choir
