= Morris Winchevsky School =

School in Toronto, Canada

The Morris Winchevsky School (founded in 1928) is a supplemental Jewish school in Toronto, Ontario, Canada. The focus of the curriculum is on strengthening ties to Jewish culture and heritage within a secular humanist framework. Key focuses are Tikkun Olam and social justice. The school's curriculum is an experiential and historical one, focusing on the nearly four thousand-year history of the Jewish People, culminating in the current period of secularization. It is intended to instill in students an appreciation of Hebrew and Yiddishkayt (Yiddish language and culture) as well as the culture of Jews around the world. The three programs it runs are: Kinder Kapers (a preschool program); the Morris Winchevsky School (a modular approach to SK-Grade 6 Jewish education); and the Secular B'nai Mitzvah Program.

The Morris Winchevsky School and the Winchevsky Centre are affiliated with the United Jewish Peoples' Order which sponsors a number of progressive secular Jewish institutions such as Camp Naivelt and the Toronto Jewish Folk Choir. It is run by Education Director Lia Tarachansky and the Shule Advisory Committee.

The Winchevsky School was originally located in the Christie and Bloor area. It then moved to the site of the Morris Winchevsky Centre in the Bathurst and Lawrence Area but in 2011 it returned downtown to its current location - the 918 Bathurst Centre.

== See also ==
- Morris Winchevsky
