= Outlook =

Outlook or The Outlook may refer to:

== Computing ==
- Microsoft Outlook, an e-mail client and personal information management software product from Microsoft
- Outlook for Windows, also referred to as the new Outlook
- Microsoft Outlook (mobile app), also referred to as Outlook for Android or Outlook for IOS, a mobile app for personal information management
- Outlook.com, a web mail service from Microsoft
- Outlook on the web, a suite of web applications by Microsoft for Outlook.com, Office 365, Exchange Server, and Exchange Online
- Outlook Express, an e-mail and news client bundled with earlier versions of Microsoft Windows

== Places ==
- Outlook, Montana, a town in Montana, United States
- Outlook, Saskatchewan, a town in Saskatchewan, Canada
- Outlook, Washington, a town in Yakima Valley of Washington State
- Outlook Peak, a mountain on Axel Heiberg Island, Nunavut, Canada

== Printed media ==
=== Media companies ===
- Outlook Media, a company that publishes Outlook Columbus, a GLBT magazine based in Columbus, Ohio

=== Magazines ===
- Outlook (Indian magazine), a weekly English-language news magazine published in India
- Outlook (Jewish magazine), a left-leaning Canadian Jewish magazine founded in 1962
- Outlooks, a monthly gay magazine published in Canada
- The Outlook (British magazine), a political magazine published between 1898 and 1928
- The Outlook (New York City), a popular weekly magazine published in New York, 1870–1935
- The Outlook Magazine, a Chinese lifestyle magazine

=== Newspapers ===
- The Outlook (Gresham), a newspaper published in Gresham, Oregon
- The Outlook (Rathfriland), a newspaper published in Rathfriland, Northern Ireland

== Other uses ==
- Outlook (1960 TV series), a Canadian television series
- Outlook (1966 TV series), Canadian short film television series
- Outlook (radio programme), a radio programme produced by BBC World Service
- Saturn Outlook, a "crossover" utility vehicle (CUV) made and marketed by General Motors Corporation
