= Nathan Cohen =

Nathan Cohen may refer to:

- Nathan Cohen (critic), Canadian theatre critic and broadcaster
- Nathan Cohen (rower), New Zealand Olympic and world champion rower
