= Avrom Yanovsky =

Canadian graphic artist (1911–1979)

- Born: April 3, 1911 Krivoi Rog, Kherson Governorate, Russian Empire (now Ukraine)
- Died: May 22, 1979 (aged 68) Toronto, Ontario, Canada
- Area: Cartoonist
- Children: Zal Yanovsky
- Relatives: Zoe Yanovsky (grandchild)
- Political party: Communist Party of Canada

Avrom Yanovsky (April 3, 1911 – May 22, 1979) was a Canadian graphic artist and editorial cartoonist, whose work appeared in a variety of leftist publications. He was known professionally as Avrom, though some of his work was also signed Armand, Richards or Tinòdi. In 1966-67, he was president of the Canadian Society of Graphic Art. His son was musician and restaurateur Zalman Yanovsky, who was a member of The Lovin' Spoonful.

== Early life ==
Yanovsky was born in 1911 at Krivoi Rog, in Tsarist Russia (now Ukraine), and came to Canada at two years of age with his family. In Winnipeg, Manitoba he was educated at the I.L. Peretz Shule and St. John's Technical High School. He also took classes at the Winnipeg School of Art and, after moving to Toronto, Ontario, the Ontario College of Art. In 1938-39, he attended the American Artists School in New York City. He joined the Young Communist League in Winnipeg in his teens and subsequently became a lifelong member of the Communist Party of Canada.

== Cartoons ==
In the 1930s, Yanovsky's cartoons and illustrations appeared in left-oriented periodicals such as Masses and New Frontier and party newspapers such as The Worker and its successor, the Daily Clarion. From the 1940s to the 1970s, he published in the Canadian Tribune and a number of union and ethnic newspapers and leftist magazines. His cartoons attacked unemployment, poverty, fascism, racism and capitalism. They also promoted labour unions, human rights, anti-imperialism and other causes, including, by the 1950s, Canadian nationalism, peaceful coexistence and nuclear disarmament. "Although not well known to the general public in Canada," stated a history of political cartoons published in 1979, "his work was reproduced in numerous socialist publications throughout the world during the last forty years." An exhibition of Yanovsky's political cartoons was held at the Samuel J. Zacks Gallery in Toronto in 2005. Curator Anna Hudson stated: "What is so surprising about his political cartoons is how relevant the messages remain."

== Other art ==
Although known mainly as a cartoonist, Yanovsky also exhibited sketches, drawings and lithographs at the annual shows held by the Canadian Society of Graphic Art. In 1952, he published a folio of lithographs. During the brief heyday of Canadian comic books in the 1940s, he created stories and art for several series published by Bell Features. Yanovsky also designed costumes and settings for stage productions, especially those associated with the Labour League Mutual Benefit Society, later part of the United Jewish People's Order, where he was an active member. In 1958, he was appointed as the editor of the English section of the Canadian Jewish weekly Vochenblatt. Throughout his career, Yanovsky gave entertaining chalk-talks on political, historical and biblical themes to children's classes, union meetings and other audiences. He was also known for a mural depicting the Canadian doctor Norman Bethune, which was completed in 1964 for display at Communist Party headquarters in Toronto. In recent years, several websites have posted examples of his art, including photographs of the Bethune mural.
