= Keith Stein =

Canadian lawyer and businessman

- Born: Toronto, Ontario, Canada
- Education: York University (LLB)
- Occupations: Businessman, entrepreneur, lawyer, sports executive
- Employer: Dentons

Keith Stein is a Canadian lawyer, businessman, and entrepreneur. He is the co-owner and CEO of the Toronto Maple Leafs of the Canadian Baseball League. In 2024, he co-founded the Women's Pro Baseball League (WPBL) with Justine Siegal.

== Career ==
Stein graduated from Osgoode Hall Law School with a Bachelor of Laws degree in 1987, and was called to the Bar in Ontario in 1989. He served as counsel at Heenan Blaikie from 2008 to 2014, since which point he has been counsel at Dentons. He has taught at York University and the Law Society of Ontario.

Stein's entrepreneurial endeavors include investing in Simmons Records, a record label owned by Gene Simmons, and in Psychedelic Water, a Canadian beverage brand which sells kava-based drinks.

In 2000, Stein worked with Rob Godfrey to establish the Toronto Phantoms of the Arena Football League. In 2023, Stein and Godfrey, purchased the Canadian Baseball League's Toronto Maple Leafs. Following the purchase, Stein has also served as the team's CEO.

In October 2024, Stein cofounded the Women's Pro Baseball League (WPBL) with Justine Siegal. He cited the success of other women's sports leagues, including the Women's National Basketball Association and the National Women's Soccer League, as sources of inspiration. The WPBL's debut season is planned to commence on August 1, 2026.

== Personal life ==
Stein is Jewish.
