= New Fraternal Jewish Association =

Left-wing, Pro-Israel Organization of Soviet Union

The New Fraternal Jewish Association was founded in Toronto in January 1960 by approximately 200 former members of the United Jewish People's Order who had left UJPO for not being critical enough of the Soviet Union. The split was the culmination of four years of debate within the Communist-aligned UJPO after revelations by J. B. Salsberg of the extent of antisemitism in the Soviet Union under Stalin and Khrushchev. Founded by Sam Lipshitz and Morris Biderman but led through much of its existence by Salsberg, the NFJA functioned as a left-wing, pro-Israel and non-Communist fraternal organization. Salsberg served as president of NFJA several times and wrote a column in its publication, Fraternally Yours. Lipshitz, who had formerly been the longtime editor of UJPO's newspaper, Vochenblatt, edited Fraternally Yours from 1960 until his death in 2000.

Like UJPO, the New Fraternal Jewish Association offered mortuary benefits to its members. It owned a cemetery section at Bathurst Lawn Memorial Gardens which is now owned and maintained by Jewish Cemeteries Management Inc., a non-profit which assumes responsibility for Jewish cemeteries owned by organizations or congregations that have become defunct. It also has a section at Pardes Shalom Cemetery which is directly owned and managed by Toronto Hebrew Memorial Parks.
