= The Travellers (Canadian band) =

Canadian folk music group

- Origin: Toronto, Ontario, Canada
- Genre: Folk
- Years active: 1953–1990s
- Past members: Jerry Gray; Sid Dolgay; Helen Gray; Jerry Goodis; Oscar Ross; Ray Woodley; Joe Hampson; Simone Johnston; Pam Fernie; Aileen Ahern; Marty Meslin; Ted Roberts; Don Vickery

The Travellers were a Canadian folk singing group that formed in mid-1953. They are best known for their rendition of a Canadian version of "This Land Is Your Land" with lyrics that reference Canadian geography.

== History ==
=== Origins and early success (1953–1960) ===
The group was formed as a result of singalongs at Camp Naivelt, a Jewish socialist vacation community that is operated by the United Jewish Peoples' Order in the village of Norval located west of Brampton, Ontario. Pete Seeger was a regular visitor to the camp and encouraged the group.

Founding members of the group – all Jewish Torontonians who met as children at the camp – were Jerry Gray, Sid Dolgay, Helen Gray (Jerry's sister), Jerry Goodis, and Oscar Ross. The group originally considered calling itself "The Beavers", a Canadian play on the name of the American folk group The Weavers. Instead, they went with the Travellers, obliquely referencing their status as "fellow travellers", i.e. leftists.

The group started singing outside the camp at labour events in the Toronto area, and at strikes and protests. Helen Gray left the group in 1954 to get married, and was replaced by Simone Johnston who had also attended Camp Naivelt with the others, although she was not Jewish. As well, from 1954 to 1961, Toronto musician, composer and advertising executive Samuel Goldberg was instrumental in working with the Travellers as their artistic director and agent. He enabled them to have their television debut and several appearances on CBC-TV musical programs. They made their debut on Canadian television in 1954 and, in 1956, achieved national exposure when they reached the finals of CBC Television's Pick the Stars contest. By this point, Ross had dropped out of the group to become a mime, replaced for a time by Marty Meslin. Meslin himself dropped out of the Travellers in 1957 and was not replaced.

After these personnel changes, for their first three albums (released between 1958 and 1961), the group was a quartet of Jerry Gray (banjo, lead vocal), Sid Dolgay (mandocello), Jerry Goodis (tenor vocal) and Simone Johnston (soprano vocal). Jack Lander accompanied the group on bass for their recordings (and many live appearances) through the mid-1960s, but was not an official member of the group. Goldberg was musical director on their first three albums, Across Canada with the Travellers (1958), The Travellers Sing Songs of North America (1959), and Quilting Bee (1960). For these and all subsequent releases, The Travellers generally recorded a mix of traditional songs (with an emphasis on Canadian folk songs), and covers of songs by folk artists like Woody Guthrie, Lee Hays, and Huddie Ledbetter. Their most well-known recording from this era (included on their debut album) was a version of Guthrie's "This Land Is Your Land", adapted by the group to reference Canadian sights and places. Seeger 'gave' the song to The Travellers when The Weavers were black listed on American radio and their version of the song could not be distributed.

=== Personnel changes and continued success (1961–1969) ===
The tensions that existed in the group and the clashes that went on were at once human, they were politically driven, there was some resentment, and there were honest differences of opinion. This had built up a little before the first Mariposa Folk Festival. ... I did not want to leave the group, but circumstances dictated that I had to make a decision, and it was a tough one.

— Jerry Goodis

Revelations after the 1953 death of Joseph Stalin about Stalin's horrific and genocidal ethnic cleansings affected the group deeply, as members of the group (who were variously leftists, socialists and nominal communists), had enthusiastically supported Stalin as a worker's champion. A particular rift developed between Goodis, who completely repudiated Stalin, and Dolgay who – while condemning the genocide – still supported Stalin's other policies. The Travellers performed at the first Mariposa Folk Festival in 1961, but later in 1961, partly due to the political divisions within the group, Goodis, who was also an advertising man, left the Travellers and was replaced by Ray Woodley (guitar, vocal). Woodley was a typesetter and trade unionist, a working class member of the band, born in Copper Creek, and raised by a family of mine workers in Sudbury. He became one of the most recognizable members with his strong tenor voice, 12 string Gibson guitar playing, and a contemporary stage presence. He was an anchor for the group during its glory days throughout the 1960s, headlining the Mariposa Folk Festival, touring the Soviet Union (the second Canadian act after Glenn Gould to play the U.S.S.R), command performances for the Queen in Canada and in London at the Royal Albert Hall, appearances at Osaka, Japan in 1970, performing regularly on CBC-TV shows including The Travellers' own specials, and the triumph of spending the 1967 Expo Centennial year on the road travelling across Canada from east to west, and in the North playing folk songs from all Canadian cultures to all types of Canadians.

The Soviet tour took place in 1962 when The Travellers were invited by the Canadian government to tour the Soviet Union as part of a Canada-USSR cultural exchange. They performed 19 concerts, and which included Jewish material in Yiddish suppressed in the U.S.S.R, and were enthusiastically received by large audiences. They had wide media coverage, including television performances in the Ukraine. While the tour was a success, a visit by the group to see Gray's aunt (who was living in Lithuania) exposed divisions between Gray and Dolgay, who disagreed sharply about the Soviet government's treatment of their citizens (particularly Jewish citizens), with Dolgay again supporting the Soviet policies. The next year the Travellers toured Canada, but were denied entry to the United States when they announced plans to sing at rallies in support of Martin Luther King, Jr. (Instead, they held a fundraiser for MLK in Toronto alongside Harry Belafonte and Oscar Peterson.) In 1964, The Travellers were part of a Royal Command Performance during the Queen's tour of Canada.

In 1965, the divisions between Dolgay and Gray reached an apex. Gray felt that in addition to their internal political disputes that Dolgay's "archaic" instrument (mandocello), "dour" stage demeanour, and reluctance to modernize the act was keeping The Travellers from being successful. With the group on the precipice of a breakup due to these tensions, Dolgay was replaced by singer/bassist Joe Hampson (billed as Joe Lawrence through the mid-1970s and husband of Sharon Hampson, much later of Sharon, Lois & Bram fame.) As Hampson was now on bass, Lander no longer accompanied the group. The group continued to tour, but was again refused entry into the U.S. in 1965, as they were deemed to have ties to leftist causes and organizations (including Camp Naivelt) disapproved of by the American government.

The Travellers continued to record and release albums in Canada through the 1960s, still keeping to a traditional folk repertoire but occasionally incorporating new folk-oriented material from Bob Dylan, as well more regularly adding songs by newly emerging Canadian songwriters like Ian Tyson, Oscar Brand (most notably Something to Sing About), Wade Hemsworth, Gordon Lightfoot, Joni Mitchell, and Leonard Cohen into the mix. The group's popularity peaked during the 1960s folk revival. Canadiana songs were a major part of their repertoire during the Canadian Centennial year of 1967, including at Expo 67.

In 1968, along with Katherine McKinnon they headlined the Grandstand Show at Toronto's Canadian National Exhibition in a show called Sea To Sea: The Iron Machine, which was written by Don Harron and chronicled the early history of Canadian railroads. A soundtrack of the musical was issued in which the Travellers performed two songs, including Gordon Lightfoot's "Canadian Railroad Trilogy".

I thought, we're not dealing with anything. We're not dealing with racism, we're not dealing with poverty ... I was talking about leaving the group and becoming a chef! Then Jerry took my word for it and pushed the issue, and they pushed me out of the group.

— Simone Johnston

Throughout their career, the members of The Travellers all had to maintain day jobs to make a living; the group avers they never saw a single penny of royalties from any of their numerous recordings of the 1950s and 1960s. By the mid-1960s, Gray (by that time the group's only original member) became increasingly interested in pushing the Travellers to be a more commercially viable act, and worked towards achieving that goal. Unfortunately, Johnston became dissatisfied with the moderately more commercial and pop-oriented direction of the Travellers, and felt that a Molson Canadian television commercial they performed for in the later 1960s (as well as their overall less-political orientation after their 1967 LP A Century of Song: A Salute to Canada's Working People which included several labour union protest songs) was not in keeping with the group's original leftist raison d'être. She left the Travellers by the end of the 1960s.

=== Changing their sound and winding down (1970–2000s) ===
By 1970, the Travellers line-up (which still included Gray, Woodley and Hampson) was expanded to move towards a more contemporary folk-rock sound. Johnston was replaced by Pam Fernie (lead vocals), and added to the group were Ted Roberts (lead guitar, arrangements) and Don Vickery (drums). At this juncture, it had been Woodley rather than Gray who had become dissatisfied not at the commercial lot of one of the best known Canadian bands, but at the lack of development in the group - both the sound and the repertoire - and advocated for the new line-up and approach. The group issued two albums in 1970, one, a ground breaking children's album, the other a self-titled LP that included original, political material by Hampson, alongside covers of songs by Bruce Cockburn ("Going to the Country" released before Cockburn's debut of the same name on True North Records), Judy Collins, Jimmy Webb, Gordon Lightfoot, and others. The group declared in the liner notes: "Listen to the new Travellers - not the same group or sound as the Travellers of earlier years."

The group didn't record between 1971 and 1980, but continued to play live dates including the National Arts Centre in a 1971 double bill with comedian Rich Little, and in the same year, the Imperial Room. In 1972 The Travellers performed a long engagement for United Nations Peacekeeping Force troops in Cyprus (UNFICYP).

Woodley and Fernie left the group early in 1974; Aileen Ahern became the new soprano vocalist, and Woodley was not replaced. The group returned to the recording studio in 1980 for a children's album Merry-Go-Round on Sharon, Lois & Bram's Elephant Records label. At this point, the group consisted of Aileen Ahern (vocals), Jerry Gray (banjo, vocals), Joe Hampson (bass, vocals), Ted Roberts (lead guitar, arrangements) and Don Vickery (drums). The record was nominated for a Juno Award for Best Children's Recording.

Though they never recorded again after 1980, keeping the same line-up The Travellers continued to perform at labour rallies and political events into the 1980s, as well as touring schools and performing concerts for children. In 1990, they were rejoined by original member Sid Dolgay for performances at the 30th Mariposa Folk Festival. By the 1990s, however, the group had amicably splintered, and Jerry Gray performed with other musicians as "Jerry Gray and The Travellers", although depending on their availability he would sometimes perform with any or all of Ahern, Hampson, Roberts and Dolgay.

In 2000, Gray, Ahern, Hampson and Roberts appeared as The Travellers at the 2000 Mariposa Folk Festival. Then, all the classic-era members (Dolgay, Goodis, Gray, Johnston) appeared at Mariposa again under The Travellers banner in 2001 for the 40th anniversary of their first appearance. That same year, a National Film Board documentary (This Land Is Your Land) chronicled the group's nearly 50-year history. The film made no attempt to disguise the intra-band tensions that still existed, especially between Gray and Dolgay, but also between other band members. Woodley's views and contribution to the band's period of successes in the 1960s was largely overlooked as he refused to take part in the documentary. At the film's climax, all four classic-era Travellers got together at Camp Naivelt's 75th anniversary reunion, and eventually happily performed a spirited, albeit informal around-the-campfire song session (and a later similarly loose-but-friendly indoor after-hours session).

The 2001 reunions were the last performances by the classic quartet; Goodis died in 2002. Gray performed with various sidemen as "Jerry Gray and The Travellers" through 2012, when the Travellers name was finally retired.

In all the group produced 13 albums and performed five specials on Canadian television. Their repertoire included protest songs, folk songs, children's songs and international tunes.

== Post-Travellers careers ==
- Sid Dolgay was an electrician outside of the band, and also worked for a time as an artist manager (including for the group 3's A Crowd, which at one point featured a young Bruce Cockburn.) He maintained a strong interest in folk music, and was an important behind-the-scenes force in organizing and maintaining the Mariposa Folk Festival for many years. He was inducted into the Mariposa Festival's Hall of Fame in 2005.
- Jerry Goodis left the Travellers in 1961 to devote time to his advertising company, and became a very successful ad executive. Described as "Canada's foremost marketer", Goodis worked with clients including Harvey's, WonderBra, Swiss Chalet, Hush Puppies, Speedy Muffler, and London Life Insurance. He was also an advisor, speech writer, and policy consultant for Canadian prime minister Pierre Trudeau, and was appointed Special Emissary to the Secretary-General of the United Nations.
- Jerry Gray maintained a parallel career as a dentist throughout his time with The Travellers and thereafter. His son James Gray was a keyboard player and a member of the Canadian country-rock group Blue Rodeo from 1992 to 2005.
- Ray Woodley was active as a board member of the Mariposa Folk Festival from the mid-1960s through the 1970s. After the festival failed due to declining popular interest in folk and roots music, in 1982 he co-founded a folk festival along with Richard Flohill in Toronto. Whereas Mariposa took place entirely on the Toronto Islands, Woodley's festival assumed something of the Winnipeg Folk Festival model by adding large nighttime concerts on the mainland. Flohill programmed a few electric acts that would not have been considered suitable for Mariposa, including the Buddy Guy Blues Band and the intense, inner city Toronto reggae act, Truths and Rights. This new festival was called The Toronto Folk Festival, and its logo was designed by Burton Kramer, who had designed the iconic CBC logo several years earlier. Although it was certainly an artistic success, because of an unusual amount of rain that summer week, ticket sales were disappointing and the festival was forced to fold. In 1986, Woodley moved to the U.S. and lived in Los Angeles and in Phoenix.

== Discography ==
=== Albums ===
- Across Canada with the Travellers (Hallmark, 1958)
- The Travellers Sing Songs of North America (Hallmark, 1959)
- Quilting Bee (Columbia, 1960)
- Making Hay with the Travellers (released outside Canada as Introducing the Travellers) (Columbia, 1961)
- The Travellers on Tour (Columbia, 1962)
- Something to Sing About (Columbia, 1963)
- We're on Our Way Again (Columbia, 1965)
- A Century of Song (Arc, 1967)
- This Land: The Travellers Centennial Album (Arc, 1967)
- The Travellers Applaud Canada (Arc, 1968)
- The Travellers Sing for Kids (Cademon, 1970)
- The Travellers (CBC, 1970)
- Merry-Go-Round (Elephant, 1980)

=== Compilations and Soundtracks ===
- Still Travelling (in part a reissue of material previously released by Columbia) (Columbia, 1966)
- Sea To Sea (cast recording album credited to Catherine McKinnon, The Travellers, Donald Harron, and Robert Christie) (Arc, 1968)
- This Land Is Your Land: The Travellers 1960–1966 (Sony, 1998)
- The Best of The Travellers (Unidisc, 2000)
