= Rob Butler (baseball) =

Canadian baseball player (born 1970)

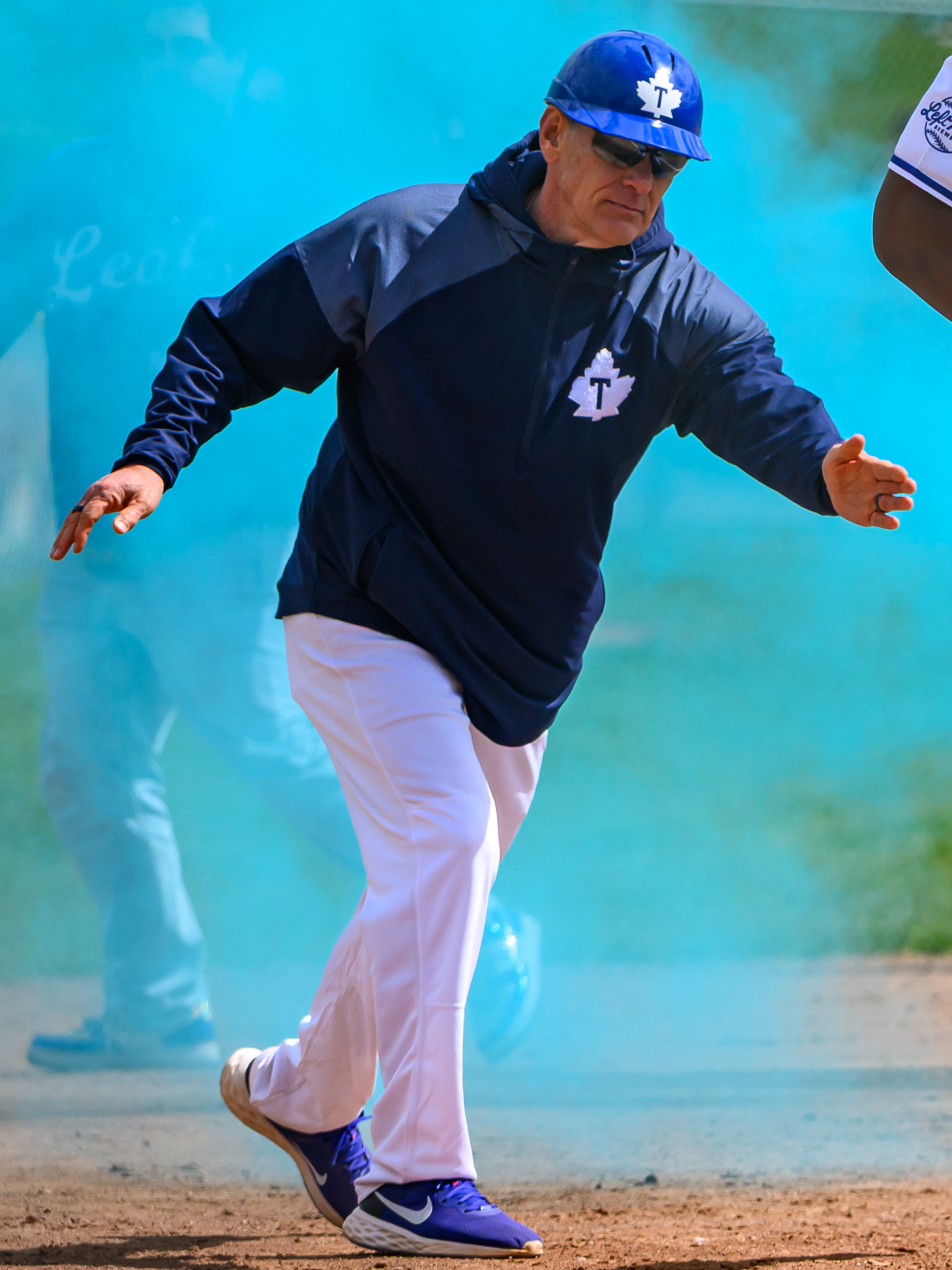
- Butler with the Toronto Maple Leafs in 2026

Toronto Maple Leafs
- Outfielder / Manager
- Born: April 10, 1970 (age 56); East York, Ontario, Canada
- Batted: Left Threw: Left

MLB debut
- June 12, 1993, for the Toronto Blue Jays

Last MLB appearance
- July 10, 1999, for the Toronto Blue Jays

MLB statistics
- Batting average: .243
- Home runs: 0
- Runs batted in: 21
- Stats at Baseball Reference

Teams
- Toronto Blue Jays (1993–1994); Philadelphia Phillies (1997); Toronto Blue Jays (1999)

Career highlights and awards
- World Series champion (1993)
Medals
Men's baseball
Representing Canada
Pan American Games
Bronze medal – third place	1999 Winnipeg	Team

Robert Frank John Butler (born April 10, 1970) is a Canadian former professional baseball outfielder, who played in Major League Baseball (MLB) for the Toronto Blue Jays and the Philadelphia Phillies. He is also a former player with the Toronto Maple Leafs of the Intercounty Baseball League and currently serves as the team's manager.

== Major League career ==
Butler first signed with the Blue Jays as an amateur free agent on September 24, 1990, and made his major league debut with them on June 12, 1993. He played in 17 regular season games and was sidelined by a hand injury he suffered when attempting to steal a base. In his 17-game stint in 1993, he had a .271 batting average with four doubles, two RBIs and 12 strikeouts. He also drew seven walks and went 2-for-4 stealing bases. In the 1993 World Series, won by Toronto, Butler went 1-for-2 with a pinch hit single off Curt Schilling of the Philadelphia Phillies, and became the only Canadian player to have won a World Series with the Blue Jays.

In 1994, Butler played in 41 games for the Blue Jays, batting .176 with one triple and five RBIs. Much of this season was split between the Blue Jays and their Triple-A affiliate, the Syracuse Chiefs. On December 5, 1994 he was traded to the Phillies.

With the Phillies organization, Butler spent much of it in their minor league system, but was called up in 1997, and he played in 43 games, batting .292 with nine doubles, one triple, and 13 RBIs.

On December 22, 1997, Butler signed with the Houston Astros and spent 1998 in their minor league system.

On December 23, 1998, he returned to the Blue Jays as a free agent and appeared in eight games with the Jays during the 1999 season, playing his last Major League Baseball game on July 10, 1999.

== Semi-pro baseball ==
In 2001, Butler joined the semi-pro Toronto Maple Leafs of the Intercounty Baseball League as an outfielder. He was also joined by his brother Rich Butler, and later by former Blue Jays pitcher Paul Spoljaric. For much of those years, Rob finished the season as the team's batting leader, and in 2002, he won the league championship with them. In 2005, Butler played his last game with the Leafs, announcing his retirement from the game.

As of April 2009, Butler is a coach with the Canadian National Junior Team.

In 2023, the Toronto Maple Leafs signed Butler as team manager.
