= Toronto Maple Leafs (Canadian Baseball League) =

Baseball club in Toronto, Ontario

Information
- League: Canadian Baseball League (1969–present)
- Location: Toronto
- Ballpark: Dominico Field at Christie Pits
- Founded: 1969
- League championships: 8: 1972; 1982; 1985; 1988; 1995; 1999; 2002; 2007
- Colours: Blue, white
- General manager: Denis Bailey
- Media: Maple Leafs Baseball TV
- Website: mapleleafsbaseball.com

The Toronto Maple Leafs are a professional baseball team in the Canadian Baseball League (CBL), based in Toronto, Ontario. They play their home games on "Dominico Field" at Christie Pits. From 1969–2025, they operated as a semi-pro team. During that time, they were also known colloquially as the Intercounty Maple Leafs or the Intercounty Leafs to disambiguate themselves from the Toronto Maple Leafs hockey team via an allusion to the CBL's former branding as the Intercounty Baseball League.

== History ==
The Maple Leafs baseball team began to play in 1969 as a semi-pro team in the Intercounty Baseball League, two years after the original Toronto Maple Leafs baseball team of the Triple-A International League moved to Louisville, Kentucky.

In their first year, the new Leafs lost 23 games and finished 18 games from first place, which remains their worst end-of-season result. Since then, they have reached first place 19 times and currently maintain the highest winning percentage of any active team in the League.

The team was owned by husband and wife Jack and Lynne Dominico for the first 40 years of its existence and was then owned exclusively by Jack after Lynne's death on November 8, 2008, until his death on January 12, 2022. The Inter-county Baseball League Championship is also named in their honour, the Jack and Lynne Dominico Trophy. In 2023 the team, now run by the Dominico estate, went up for sale.

In November 2023, the Maple Leafs were sold for over $1 million to a new group made up of Keith Stein, Rob Godfrey (Son of former Toronto Blue Jays president Paul Godfrey), as well as others.

On December 3, 2024, the Leafs announced they had signed Ayami Sato, making her the first female player in the IBL as well as the first female player to play professional baseball in Canada. She began playing on May 11, 2025.

On November 24, 2025, the Intercounty Baseball League transitioned from a semi-pro baseball league to a professional baseball league rebranded as the Canadian Baseball League. The Maple Leafs played their first game as a professional sports team in May of 2026.

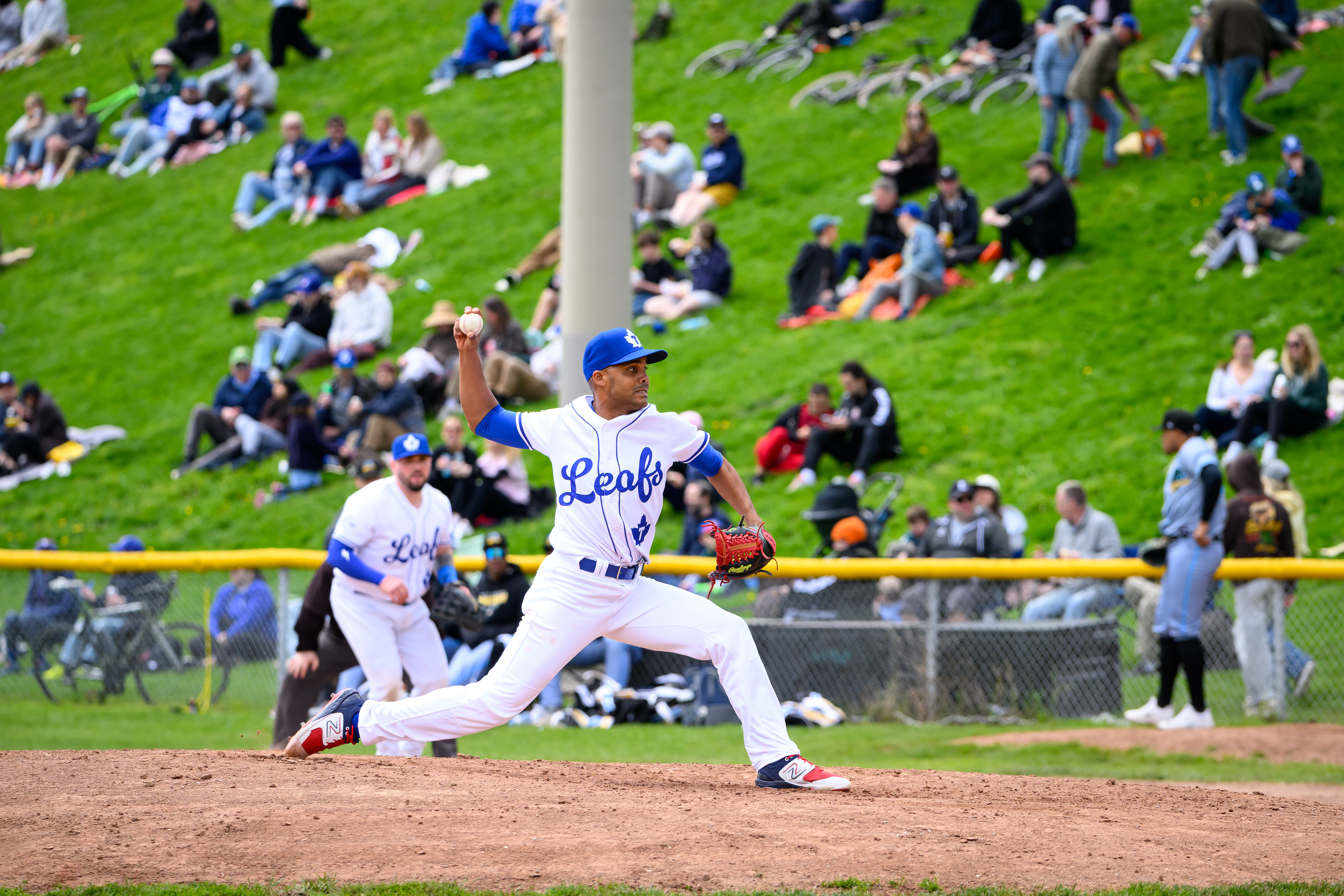
The Maple Leafs playing at Christie Pits on the first day of the 2026 season

=== Season records (2000–present) ===
Year	Games	Wins	Losses	Reg. season finish	Playoffs
2000	35	23	12	3rd	Lost Semifinals
2001	32	29	3	1st	Lost Finals
2002	35	31	4	1st	Won Finals
2003	35	26	9	1st	Lost Semifinals
2004	36	28	8	1st	Lost Semifinals
2005	34	29	5	1st	Lost Finals
2006	36	25	11	2nd	Lost Semifinals
2007	36	29	7	1st	Won Finals
2008	36	17	19	5th	Lost Quarterfinals
2009	36	24	12	3rd	Lost Semifinals
2010	36	23	13	2nd	Lost Quarterfinals
2011	35	22	13	2nd	Lost Semifinals
2012	36	18	18	5th	Lost Quarterfinals
2013	42	21	21	2nd	Lost Quarterfinals
2014	36	16	20	6th	Did not qualify
2015	36	15	21	5th	Lost Semifinals
2016	36	19	17	5th	Lost Finals
2017	36	18	18	4th	Lost Quarterfinals
2018	35	16	19	4th	Lost Semifinals
2019	36	16	20	6th	Lost Quarterfinals
2020	Season cancelled due to COVID-19 Pandemic				
2021	30	16	14	2nd	Lost Finals
2022	42	24	18	4th	Lost Finals
2023	41	21	20	4th	Lost Semifinals
2024	42	17	25	7th	Lost Quarterfinals
2025	42	18	24	7th	Lost Quarterfinals

== Championships ==
Since its inception, the team has won the Jack and Lynne Dominico Trophy as Intercounty Baseball champions eight times, the first in 1972. During the 2002 season, the Leafs were undefeated at home, a first for the league. They also won the championship that year. They have also achieved many individual awards and All-Star nominations.

- Championships (8): 1972, 1982, 1985, 1988, 1995, 1999, 2002, 2007

== Roster ==
Toronto Maple Leafs roster
Active roster		Coaching staff
Pitchers: 54 (Venezuela) Wilgenis Alvarado; -- (Canada) Ethan Boisvert; 29 (Canada) Ryan Capuano; 23 (Dominican Republic) Reinaldo de Paula; 27 (United States) Camden Dimidjian; 13 (Dominican Republic) Luis Florentino; 40 (United States) Frankie Gulko; 99 (Canada) Alex Lanigan; 47 (Japan) Yuto Nakata; 44 (Canada) Kyle Poapst; -- (Canada) Graham Sim; 33 (Canada) Nick Veselinovic	Catchers: 2 (Canada) Matt Brandt; -- (Canada) Dionysius Chialtas; Infielders: 3 (Canada) Mike Cecchetto; 7 (Canada) Brando Leroux; 21 (Cuba) Yordan Manduley; 5 (Canada) Spenser Ross; 17 (United States) Crixtian Taveras; Outfielders: 19 (Canada) Dennis Dei Baning; 18 (Canada) JJ Dutton; 4 (Canada) Marcus Knecht; -- (Canada) Yolki Pena; 66 (Cuba) Yasiel Puig; 14 (Canada) Ben Sitarenios	Manager Coaches; Roster updated on August 7, 2026: Disabled list; ‡ Inactive list; § Suspended list

== Notable players ==
Former Major League Baseball player Pete Orr once played for the Toronto Maple Leafs, as did former Toronto Blue Jays outfielder Rich Butler (2001–2002). Rich's brother, Rob Butler, who was also a former Toronto Blue Jays outfielder, played with the Leafs (2001–2005), as did former Blue Jays pitcher Paul Spoljaric (2002–2007). Chris Leroux (2009–2014), Dustin Richardson (2009–2010), and Angel Castro (2015) are also former major leaguers that have played for the Leafs. Ayami Sato became the league's first female player (2025), a member of Japan's women's national baseball team.

== Team operations ==
- Denis Bailey - General Manager
- - Manager
- - Assistant Coach

== Current roster ==
No signings have been made official regarding the 2027 roster, as all players must sign or re-sign on a yearly basis. However, each team retains the signing rights to a select number of rostered individuals from the previous season, until such time that a player is re-signed, traded, released, or otherwise not active.

== Retired numbers ==
Toronto Maple Leafs retired numbers
No.	Player	Position	Tenure	Date
36	Paul Spoljaric	Pitcher	2002–2007	July 13, 2025
