= Fighting Words (game show) =

Canadian panel quiz television series

- Created by: Harvey Hart
- Presented by: Nathan Cohen (1952-62, 1970); Peter Gzowski (1982)
- Opening theme: "Tillie's Tango"
- Country of origin: Canada
- Original language: English

Production
- Producers: Gordon Babineau (1952-58); Cliff Solway (1958-60); Don McPherson (1960-62)

Original release
- Network: CBC Television
- Release: 30 December 1952 – 22 July 1962

Fighting Words is a Canadian panel quiz show that aired on CBC Television from 1952 to 1962. The series returned for short runs in 1970 and 1982.

== Premise ==
The series was hosted and moderated by Toronto Star columnist Nathan Cohen. The basic format featured four guest panelists who attempt to identify people who wrote or said a given a quotation, then discuss its subject. Each program featured three rounds of quotations on various topics, often illustrated by cartoons.

The series temporarily deviated from this format in November 1959 when it became a detailed interview between Cohen and a guest concerning a given subject. Guests during this phase included American education academic Robert Maynard Hutchins and British theatre critic Kenneth Tynan.

The host and producers initially had difficulty selecting women panelists for Fighting Words but eventually featured guests such as Solange Chaput-Rolland and aired a few episodes with an all-female panel. Former Ottawa mayor Charlotte Whitton also appeared in several episodes.

In the earliest episodes, J. B. McGeachy and Ted Allan served as regular panelists who were joined by two guests. Later, there were no designated regular panel members. The series drew on personalities who were intellectual and opinionated such as William E. Blatz, Morley Callaghan, Irving Layton and Gérard Pelletier.

As of 1959, viewers who submitted quotations that were presented on Fighting Words would receive a book and two LP records. Viewers would also win an encyclopedia if the panel was unable to determine the quotation's author.

The series concept was developed by Cohen and Harvey Hart and the series title was conceived by Mavor Moore.

== Scheduling ==
Fighting Words consisted of half-hour episodes, broadcast on various dates and times throughout its run. Its debut was broadcast on 30 December 1952, initially in a 9pm Tuesday time slot. The program was seen at either 8 or 8:30pm on Tuesdays until 6 May 1953 when it was moved to a 7:30 pm Wednesday time slot. By late 1953, the series appeared on Wednesdays at 8:30 pm.

The series was frequently rescheduled to various dates and times throughout its run. After a season ended in September 1954, the series did not resume until mid-1955 in a Sunday evening time slot. During this break, the CBC attempted to reduce Cohen's role by proposing that he be one of two alternating hosts. The network also conducted a test episode without Cohen as host.

Fighting Words was cancelled by CBC as of its 26 October 1955 episode where Cohen's concluding remarks were, "Goodnight, until a later date". Just prior to that episode, CBC management restored the series after receiving a substantial number of letters from viewers demanding that Fighting Words be returned. The series resumed on 4 December 1955. During its run, Fighting Words survived cancellation on several other occasions largely due to support from its viewers.

In early 1958, the series aired in a Sunday afternoon time slot following Lassie. Cohen noted that CBC's significant audience of children at that time constrained the types of subject matter that Fighting Words could address.

Two episodes in 1958 were recorded in England, one of these aired on 15 June 1958 with guest panelists Julian Huxley, Hugh Trevor-Roper, Violet Bonham-Carter and Stephen King-Hall.

The final episode of the original series aired 22 July 1962 with guest panelists Arnold Edinborough, Robert Fulford, Marcus Long and Charles Templeton. After CBC cancelled the series, Cohen stated "I find the decision a great relief. I have never believed... that TV or radio programs should continue indefinitely.".

== Reception ==
An episode featuring Albert Ellis, author of Sex Without Guilt, drew criticism from Charles Jennings, Canada's controller of broadcasting. Jennings issued a memo in 1958 expressing concerns that the program portrayed an unbalanced presentation of views and lacked good taste, charging that other members of the panel did not have the sufficient background to provide contrary arguments to Ellis.

In November 1957, New Brunswick member of Parliament Henry Murphy objected to the content of Fighting Words in the House of Commons, concerned that the program's content concerning "prostitution, homosexuals, and other allied subjects" was detrimental to "family life and Christian ideals".

Cohen addressed concerns that the series was derivative of What's My Line? by countering that Fighting Words "has a much higher opinion of audience intelligence" than the American series.

Bob Blackburn of the Ottawa Citizen described Fighting Words as "the most outspoken program on Canadian television", noting that it "violates practically all of the taboos". By 1960, topics such as freedom, pornography and rape were discussed on the program.

Author Paul Rutherford noted the series addressed "weighty issues of ethics and morality, politics, or the arts" while crediting Cohen's moderation skills.

== Revivals and imitators ==
Rival station CFTO-TV produced QED in 1961 as an attempt to copy the Fighting Words concept, but that series failed after several months.

In 1970, Cohen hosted a brief return of the series.

Peter Gzowski hosted another revival of the series in 1982 with guest panelists such as Bella Abzug, Barbara Amiel, Claire Hoy, Irving Layton, Bob Rae, Morton Shulman, Gordon Sinclair and Larry Solway.

== Bibliography ==
- Rutherford, Paul (1990). When Television Was Young: Primetime Canada 1952-1967. University of Toronto Press. ISBN 0-8020-5830-2.
