= Marcus Knecht =

Canadian baseball player (born 1990)

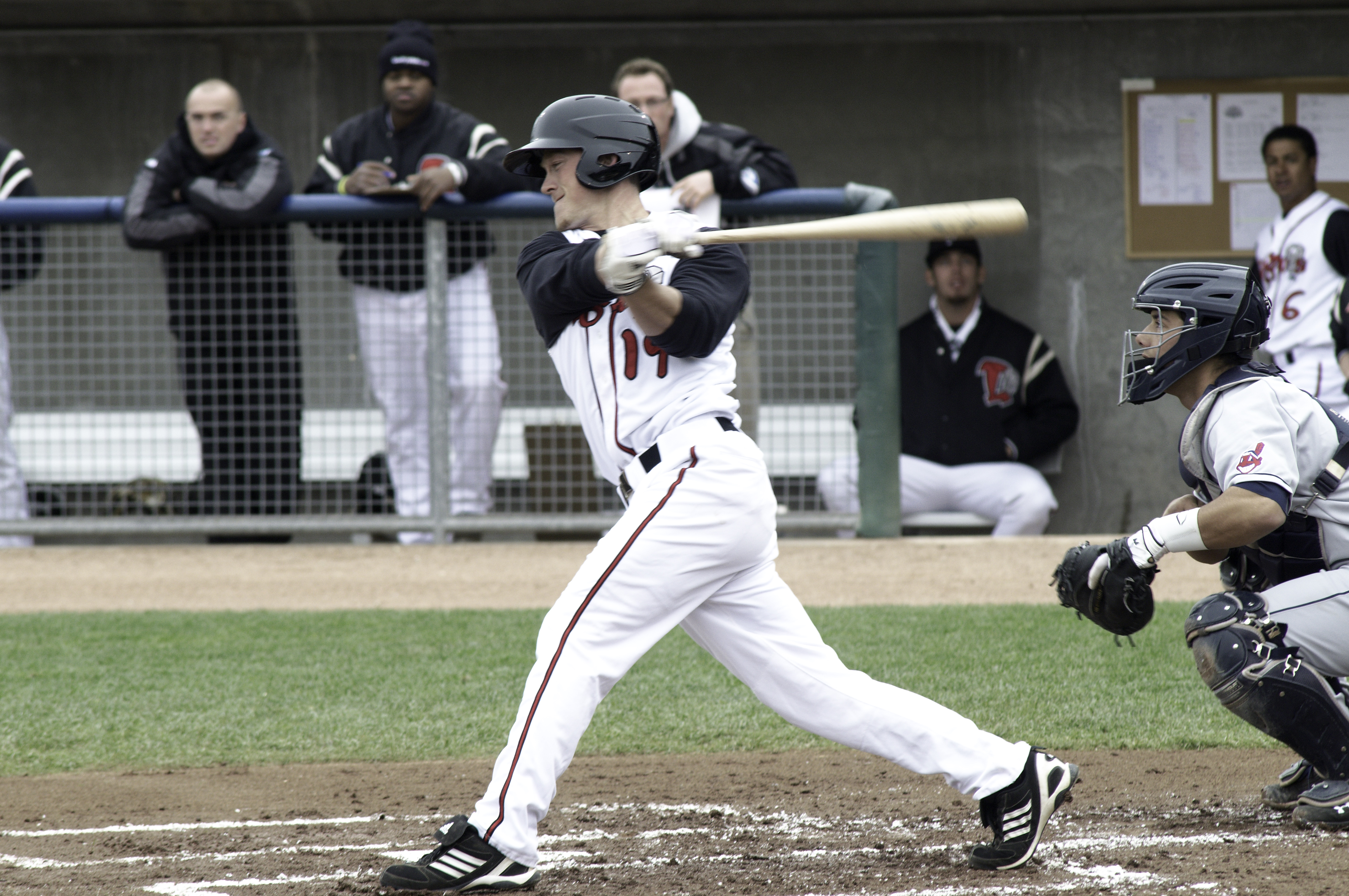
- Knecht batting for the Lansing Lugnuts

Toronto Maple Leafs – No. 24
- Outfielder
- Born: June 21, 1990 (age 36); Toronto, Ontario, Canada
- Bats: Right Throws: Right
- Stats at Baseball Reference
Medals
Men's baseball
Representing Canada
Baseball World Cup
Bronze medal – third place	2011 Panama City	Team
Pan American Games
Gold medal – first place	2011 Guadalajara	Team

Marcus Allen Knecht (born June 21, 1990) is a Canadian professional baseball outfielder for the Toronto Maple Leafs of the Canadian Baseball League (CBL). Prior to beginning his professional career, he played college baseball at Oklahoma State University and Connors State College. Knecht has also competed for the Canadian national baseball team.

== Career ==
Knecht attended St. Michael's College School in Toronto and played youth baseball with the North York Baseball Association in Toronto. He represented the Province of Ontario in the Canadian Championships. In the 23rd round (698th overall) of the 2008 Major League Baseball draft, the Milwaukee Brewers selected Knecht, but he did not sign. Knecht enrolled at Oklahoma State University–Stillwater to play college baseball for the Oklahoma State Cowboys baseball team in the Big 12 Conference of the National Collegiate Athletic Association's (NCAA) Division I. He received only 12 at bats in 2009, which prompted him to transfer to Connors State College for 2010.

=== Toronto Blue Jays ===
Knecht was drafted by the Toronto Blue Jays in the third round (113th overall) of the 2010 Major League Baseball draft, with a compensation pick the Blue Jays received for failing to sign Jake Barrett the previous year. Knecht made his professional debut in 2010 with the Auburn Doubledays of the Low-A New York–Penn League, and slashed .268/.345/.437 with five home runs and 34 RBI. Knecht was voted the Canadian Baseball Network player of the year in 2010. Prior to the 2011 season, Baseball America named Knecht the top power hitter in the Blue Jays' organization. He was promoted to the Lansing Lugnuts of the Single–A Midwest League in 2011, where he batted .273/.377/.474 with 16 home runs and 86 RBI.

Knecht played for the Dunedin Blue Jays in the High–A Florida State League in 2012, hitting .210/.302/.389 in 126 games. He remained in Dunedin in 2013, and batted .239/.297/.382 with 11 home runs and 46 RBI. In 107 games for Dunedin in 2014, Knecht posted a .250/.328/.388 batting line with 7 home runs and 52 RBI. On March 31, 2015, Knecht was released by the Blue Jays organization.

=== Minnesota Twins ===
The Minnesota Twins signed Knecht to a minor-league contract on April 3, 2015. He split the season between the Double-A Chattanooga Lookouts and the High-A Fort Myers Miracle, accumulating a .221/.320/.310 batting line with two home runs and 48 RBI. He was released by the Twins organization on March 28, 2016.

=== Québec Capitales ===
On April 20, 2016, Knecht signed with the Québec Capitales of the Can-Am League. In 2016, Knecht slashed .259/.342/.413 with 8 home runs and 49 RBI in 94 games. The next year with the Capitales, he batted .242/.349/.366 with 5 home runs and 43 RBI in 85 games. He was released by Québec on February 21, 2018.

=== Toronto Maple Leafs ===
On April 9, 2018, Knecht signed with the Toronto Maple Leafs of the Intercounty Baseball League. In 2018, he batted .231 with five home runs and 18 RBI for Toronto, and improved his performance in 2019, slashing .326 with eight home runs and 27 RBI.

=== West Virginia Power ===
On May 27, 2021, Knecht signed with the West Virginia Power of the Atlantic League of Professional Baseball. In 25 games for the Power, Knecht slashed .083/.227/.111 with no home runs and one RBI before being released on July 9.

=== Toronto Maple Leafs (second stint) ===
On April 7, 2024, after two years of inactivity, Knecht signed with the Toronto Maple Leafs of the Intercounty Baseball League. In 35 appearances for Toronto, he batted .266 with four home runs and 31 RBI.

On April 8, 2025, Knecht re-signed with the Maple Leafs. He made 28 appearances for Toronto, hitting .358 with eight home runs and 24 RBI.

On February 5, 2026, Knecht re-signed with the Maple Leafs, now a part of the Canadian Baseball League.

== International career ==
Knecht has played for the Canadian national baseball team. He played in the 2008 World Junior Baseball Championship, being named to the tournament All-Star team. He participated in the 2011 Baseball World Cup, where Canada won the bronze medal, and the 2011 Pan American Games, where Canada won the gold medal.
