= United Jewish People's Order =

Jewish fraternal organization in Canada

- Formation: April 1926; 100 years ago
- Type: fraternal organization, mutual aid (formerly), education, activism
- Legal status: Active
- Official languages: Yiddish, English
- Executive Director: Sarena Sairan
- Subsidiaries: Camp Naivelt, Morris Winchevsky School
- Secessions: New Fraternal Jewish Association (1960)
- Affiliations: CPA, CSJO, IFSHJ, IISHJ, IJV Canada, JVP
- Website: winchevskycentre.org
- Formerly called: Jewish Labour League Mutual Benefit Society

The United Jewish People's Order is a Jewish cultural, political and educational fraternal organization in Canada. It is secular and socialist. The UJPO traces its history to the founding of the Jewish Labour League Mutual Benefit Society in 1926.

== History ==
=== Early history ===
After the Russian Revolution and the creation of the Communist Party of the Soviet Union, divisions within the Arbeiter Ring became increasingly bitter. In Toronto, pro-Bolshevik women withdrew from the Ring in 1923, forming the Jewish Working Women's League (Yiddish: יידיש אַרבעטער פֿרױען פֿאַראיין, romanized: Yiddish Arbeter Froyen Fareyn). When it was clear that control of the organization would stay in the hands of those critical of the Revolution, the men also withdrew and formed the Jewish Labour League Mutual Benefit Society in 1926, which became a social and intellectual home for Jewish communists. The Canadian Workers' Circle was similarly formed in Montreal and Winnipeg. The two organizations merged on 4 October 1945 to form the UJPO.

At its peak in the 1940s and 1950s, the UJPO had more than 2,500 members nationwide, with branches established in Hamilton and Niagara Falls, Ontario, Calgary, and Vancouver, among others. The UJPO's leadership included well-known Jewish communists and pro-Soviet Union activists, including Sholem Shtern, J. B. Salsberg, Joseph Zuken, Annie Buller, Sam Carr, and Fred Rose. The UJPO was active in supporting Jewish settlement in Birobidzhan through the Canadian Biro-Bidjan Committee.

=== Cold War era ===
The Toronto branch of the UJPO was originally housed in the Jewish Workers' Cultural Centre on Brunswick Avenue, just north of Kensington Market, and then for many years in its own building on Christie Street, overlooking Christie Pits. UJPO's headquarters in Montreal were in the Morris Winchevsky Cultural Centre on de l'Esplanade Avenue from 1947 onwards. UJPO Montreal also operated the Morris Winchevsky Yiddish School on Villeneuve Street West and operated summer camps, such as the Nitgedeiget. The UJPO headquarters included, as a unique feature, a second story balcony with a five-foot-tall parapet modelled on the balconies in Moscow's Red Square from which Soviet leaders would address the crowd below.

On January 27, 1950, the group's Montreal headquarters were closed under the Padlock Law, with boxes of seized books, files and organizational material carted away by the Quebec Provincial Police. Following the raid, the building was sold to the Yidish Natsionaler Arbeter Farband (יידיש־נאַציאָנאַלער אַרבעטער־פאַרבאַנד, Yidiš Naṣyonaler ʾArbeter Farband, 'Jewish National Workers Alliance'), a Labour Zionist organization, which used the building from 1951 until 1968, with the first floor being occupied by Glatt's, a kosher butcher from 1962 until the 2010s. In 1951, the UJPO was expelled from the Canadian Jewish Congress for opposing German re-armament, not to be re-admitted until 1995.

After 1955, Sam Carr, a former organizer for the Labor-Progressive Party (as the Communist Party of Canada was known), became active in the UJPO and was elected National Secretary in 1964, a position he would hold until 1986. During the crisis resulting from the release of the Secret Speech in 1956, prominent Party member J. B. Salsberg returned from a trip to the Soviet Union, where he found rampant Party-sponsored antisemitism and suppression of Jewish culture. Salsberg's findings were rejected by the Canadian Communist Party and led to his suspension from its leading bodies. Ultimately, the crisis resulted in the departure from the Communist Party of the UJPO, Salsberg, Robert Laxer and many of the Party's Jewish members in 1956.

In 1959 about one third of the UJPO's membership (including long-time leader J. B. Salsberg) left to start a new organization called the New Fraternal Jewish Association, feeling that the UJPO was not critical enough of the Soviet Union. In the years following World War II, as the Jewish community moved north along Bathurst Street, Toronto, the UJPO moved in 1960 to the Winchevsky Centre in the Bathurst and Lawrence area, where it remained until 2025.

=== Recent history ===
UJPO's sections in Winnipeg and Toronto continue to engage in a wide variety of political and cultural activities. UJPO Toronto's social justice committee has been active in organizing campaigns and speakers on a wide range of issues including labour and refugee rights; anti-racism and allyship; LGBTQ rights and opposition to homophobia and transphobia; aboriginal land rights and indigenous justice; Black Lives Matter; opposition to the Israeli occupation and bombing of Gaza; the campaigns to prevent the prosecution and extradition of Canadian academic Hassan Diab; and numerous campaigns against Islamophobia and antisemitism. The organization's Indigenous Solidarity Working Group has been active in reaching out to local Indigenous groups to promote settler-Indigenous solidarity. Continuing the organization's decades-long mission to promote Yiddish culture, UJPO-Toronto organizes a monthly drop-in singing group, Zing! Zing! Zing! and a Yiddish learning and discussion group, Red Yiddish. While the membership of UJPO has a wide range of views on the Israeli–Palestinian conflict, the organization has long opposed the Israeli occupation and promoted Palestinian rights. In 2011, the United Jewish Appeal and Canadian Jewish Congress severed their relations with UJPO's Winchevsky Centre in Toronto after the organization hosted a panel discussion featuring, among other speakers, anti-Zionist activist and Auschwitz survivor Hajo Meyer, a member of the International Jewish Anti-Zionist Network.

== Activities ==
The UJPO has branches in Winnipeg, Hamilton, and Toronto, where it operates the Winchevsky Centre, named after the famed Jewish socialist poet Morris Winchevsky. The Toronto branch sponsors several groups including the Morris Winchevsky School which holds classes at the 918 Bathurst; the drop-in singing group, Zing! Zing! Zing!, and the Yiddish learning group, Red Yiddish. UJPO Toronto also owns Camp Naivelt, a socialist Jewish cottage community in Brampton, Ontario. For decades, the Vancouver branch published a national progressive Jewish magazine Outlook, and the Winnipeg section runs a number of cultural and educational activities.

The now defunct Toronto Jewish Folk Choir held well attended concerts, several of which included long-time UJPO supporter and friend Paul Robeson, featuring Yiddish and Hebrew music. Another contribution to music made, indirectly, by the UJPO was the founding of the folk group The Travellers, which originated at Camp Naivelt in the 1950s. Zal Yanofsky—the son of prominent political cartoonist Avrom Yanovsky—spent his childhood years at Camp Naivelt and would later go on to found the Loving Spoonful with John Sebastian in 1964. Pete Seeger and a number of other prominent folk music figures including Phil Ochs often visited and sang at Camp Naivelt.

UJPO offers mortuary benefits to its members and has sections in several Jewish cemeteries including the Dawes Road Cemetery and Bathurst Lawn Memorial Park in Toronto and Kehal Israel Memorial Park and Baron de Hirsch Cemetery in Montreal.

== See also ==
- Association of United Ukrainian Canadians
- Camp Naivelt – UJPO affiliated family camp
- Canadian Jewish Congress
- Federation of Russian Canadians
- International Workers Order
- Jewish People's Fraternal Order (U.S. equivalent of UJPO)
- Morris Winchevsky School – a secular Jewish school affiliated with UJPO which offers weekend classes for children
- Organization for Jewish Colonization in Russia
- Vochenblatt – Yiddish weekly associated with UJPO
