= Christie station =

Toronto subway station

Christie
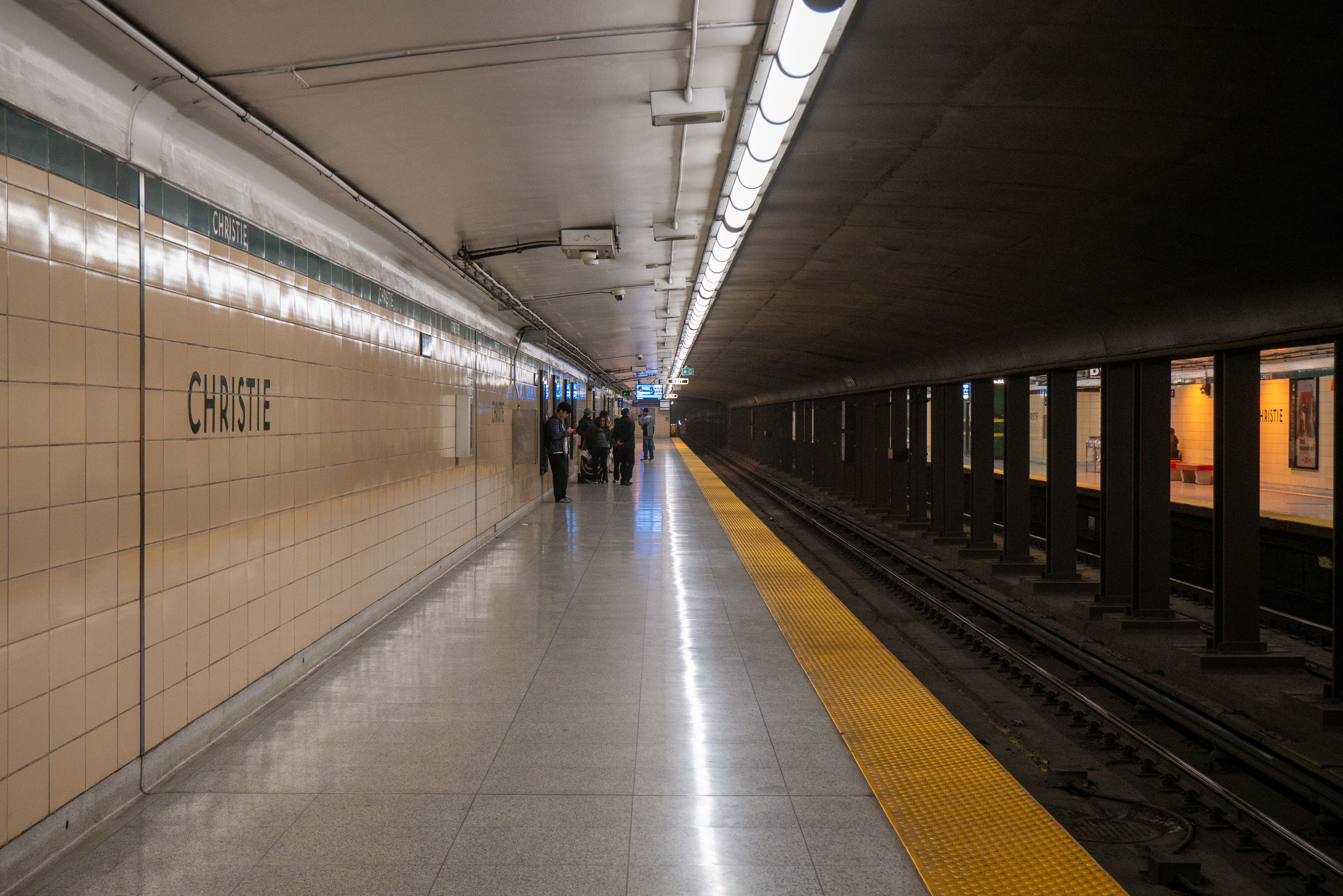

General information
- Location: 5 Christie Street; Toronto, Ontario; Canada
- Coordinates: 43°39′51″N 79°25′06″W
- Platforms: Side platforms
- Tracks: 2
- Connections: TTC buses: 126 Christie; 300 Bloor - Danforth

Construction
- Structure type: Underground
- Accessible: Yes

Other information
- Website: Official station page

History
- Opened: 26 February 1966; 60 years ago

Passengers
- 2023–2024: 11,407
- Rank: 53 of 70

Services
Preceding station	Toronto Transit Commission	Following station
Ossington towards Kipling	Line 2 Bloor–Danforth	Bathurst towards Kennedy
Location

Christie is a subway station on Line 2 Bloor–Danforth of the Toronto subway in Toronto, Ontario, Canada. It is located on the east side of Christie Street just north of Bloor Street West, and opened in 1966 as part of the original segment of the subway line.

== History ==
Christie station opened in 1966, as part of the first phase of the Bloor–Danforth line.

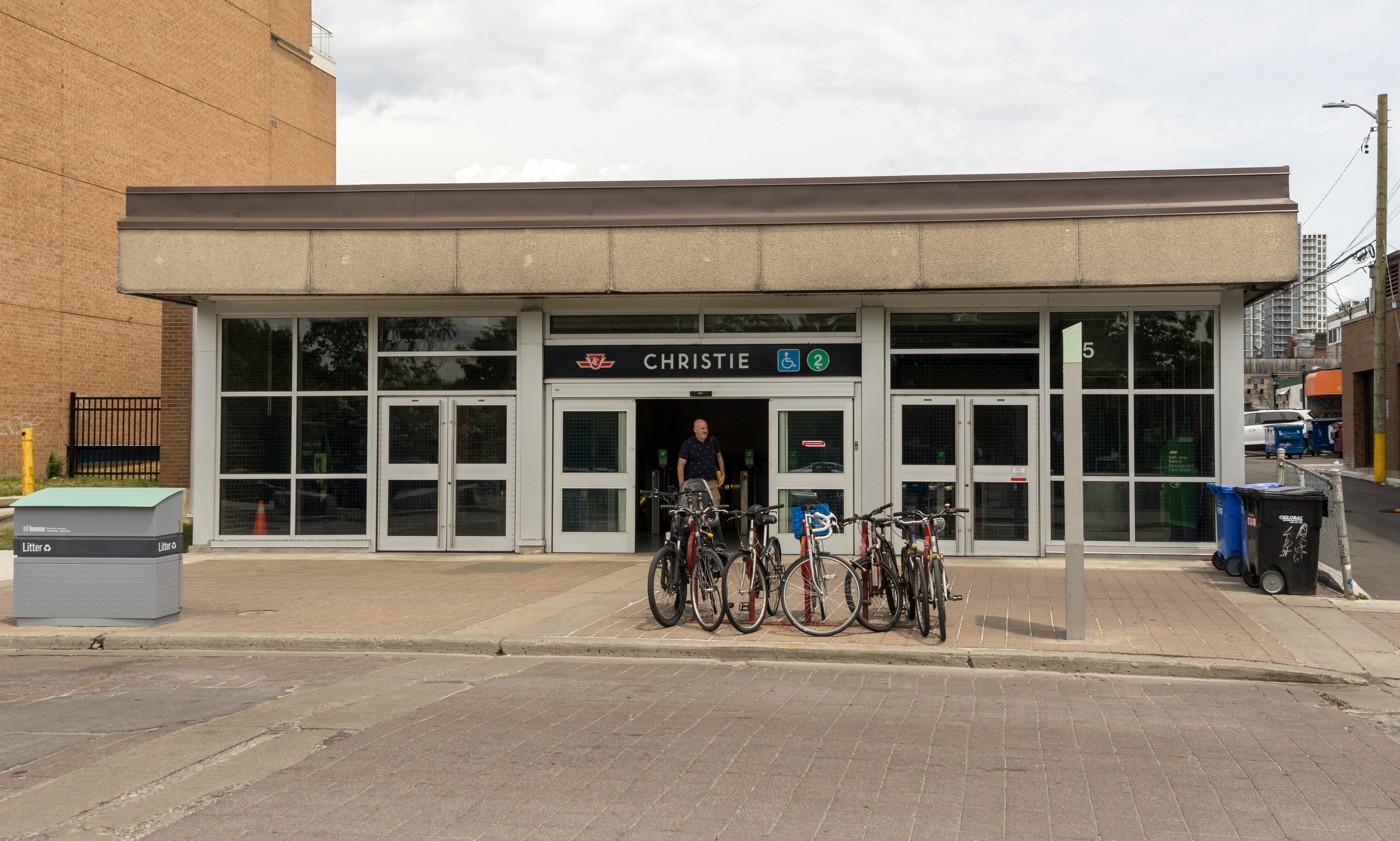
Station exterior in 2026

The station was damaged in 1976 when a fire was set on board a late-evening train. Nobody was hurt, but four cars of the train were destroyed and part of the station's platform area, including the tiled wall, suffered severe damage. During the repair parts of the trim were replaced with a different colour; red-brown instead of the original green tile.

Christie Street is named after Christy McDougall, wife of Peter McDougall, a landowner in the area. Historical documents indicate that the street was given her name by as early as 1835.

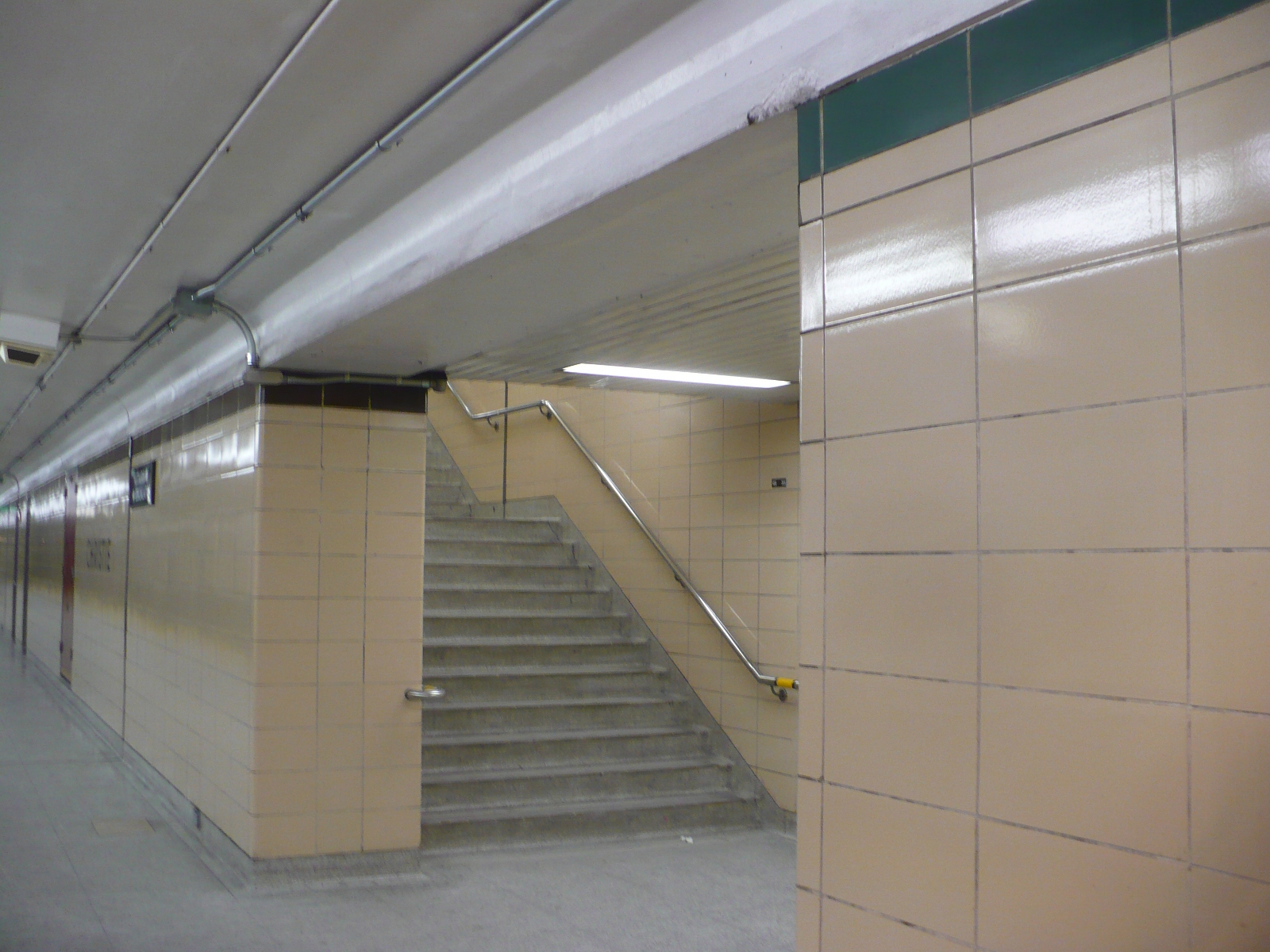
Different colour of trim tiles on either side of the exit stairway; new red-brown and the original green.

== Station access upgrades ==
Construction to make the station's main entrance wheelchair accessible by adding two elevators had begun by the fourth quarter of 2021. One elevator will link the street level, the concourse level, and the westbound platform; the other elevator will link the concourse level and the eastbound platform. Construction was completed by the end of 2025.

== Public art ==
As part of the TTC's Public Art Program, Christie station is scheduled, as of 2026, to receive a permanent public art installation titled Rise Together by Iranian-Canadian artist Sanaz Mazinani as part of the station's Easier Access and second exist modernization projects.

The artwork consists of a series of large-scale photographic panels inspired by archival TTC imagery, Toronto waterways and natural landscapes, as well as the cultural heritage of the surrounding Koreatown neighbourhood. According to the TTC, the installation is intended to create an immersive and playful visual experience for passengerss through the use of intricate patterns and vibrant colours characteristic of Mazinani's artistic practice.

== Nearby landmarks ==
Nearby landmarks include Korea Town and Christie Pits.

== Surface connections ==
Transfers to buses occur at curbside stops on Christie Street at this station.

TTC routes serving the station include:

Route	Name	Additional information
126	Christie	Northbound to St. Clair West station
