= Christie Pits =

Public recreational area in Toronto, Canada

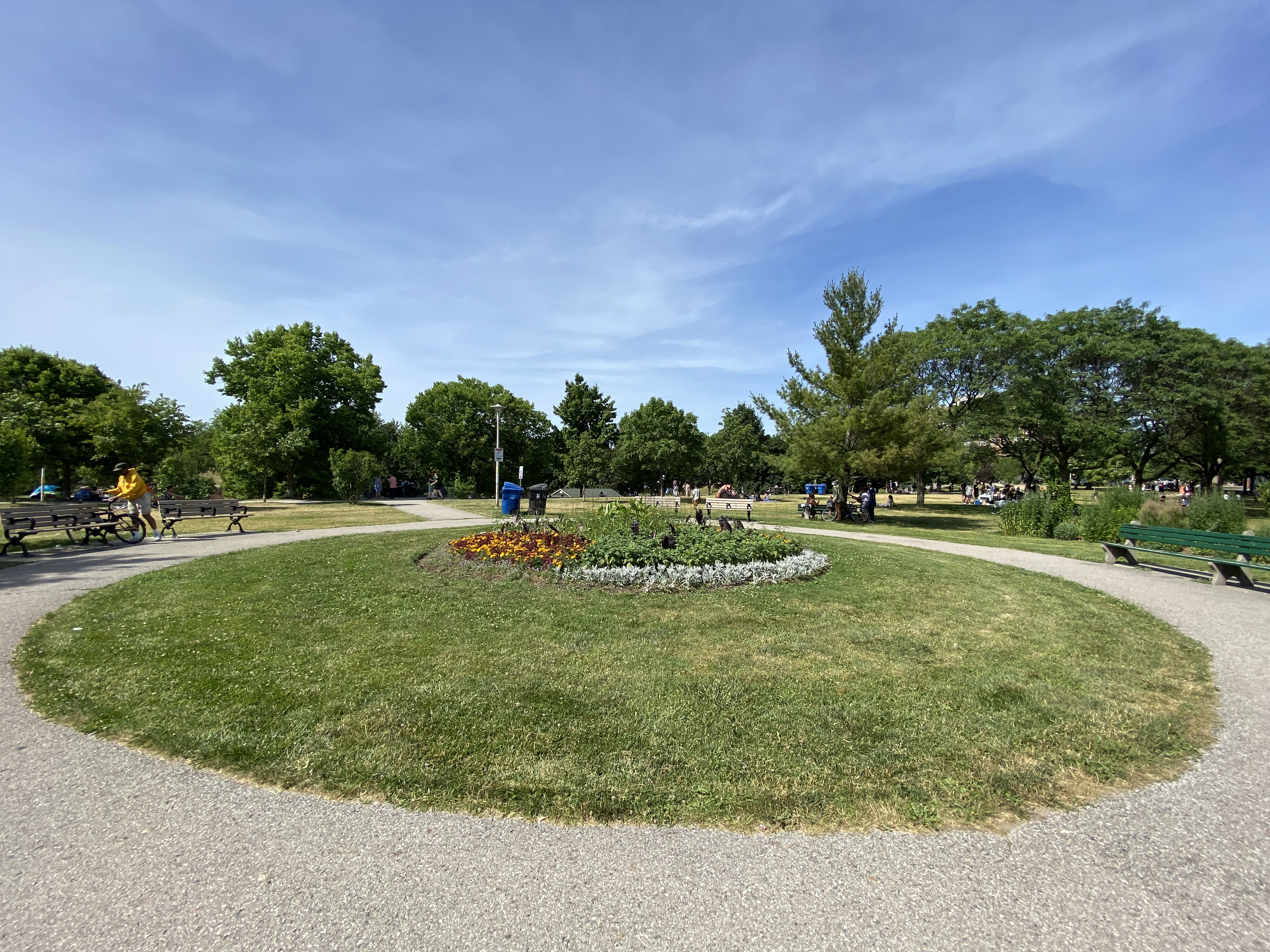
- Park in 2022
- Interactive map of Christie Pits
- Type: Urban park and recreational sport facility
- Location: 750 Bloor Street West; Toronto, Ontario, Canada
- Coordinates: 43°39′53″N 79°25′15″W
- Area: 21.9 acres (8.9 ha)
- Created: 1909 (as Willowvale Park)
- Operator: Toronto Parks, Forestry and Recreation Division
- Public transit: Christie station
- Website: www.toronto.ca/data/parks/prd/facilities/complex/196/index.html

Christie Pits (officially Willowvale Park until 1983) is a public recreational area in Toronto, Ontario, Canada. It is located at 750 Bloor Street West at Christie Street, just west of the Toronto Transit Commission's Christie subway station.

The park has an area of 21.9 acres (8.9 ha), about half of which is grassed picnic areas, the rest being various sports fields. Sports facilities on the site include three baseball diamonds (one full-sized and fenced named "Dominico Field"), basketball courts, a soccer/rugby/football field, and the Alex Duff Memorial Outdoor Pool; and a splash pad and adjacent outdoor ice rink which are located on the west edge of the park at 779 Crawford Street.

The sides of the pits are highly sloped, as a result of which most of the area of the park sits well below street level. The slopes are used in winter for tobogganing and related activities. Garrison Creek runs under the park, converted to a storm sewer at the turn of the 20th century.

The park was named after the Christie Sand Pits which were on the location until the early 1900s. The sand pits had been named after Christie Street, which was named after Christy MacDougall, wife of Peter MacDougall, a landowner in the area. Historical documents indicate that the street was given her name as early as 1835. The official name of the park, Willowvale Park, never caught on, and the common name for the park since its days as a sand pit, Christie Pits, was adopted as the park's official name in 1983.

== Dominico Field ==
Dominico Field
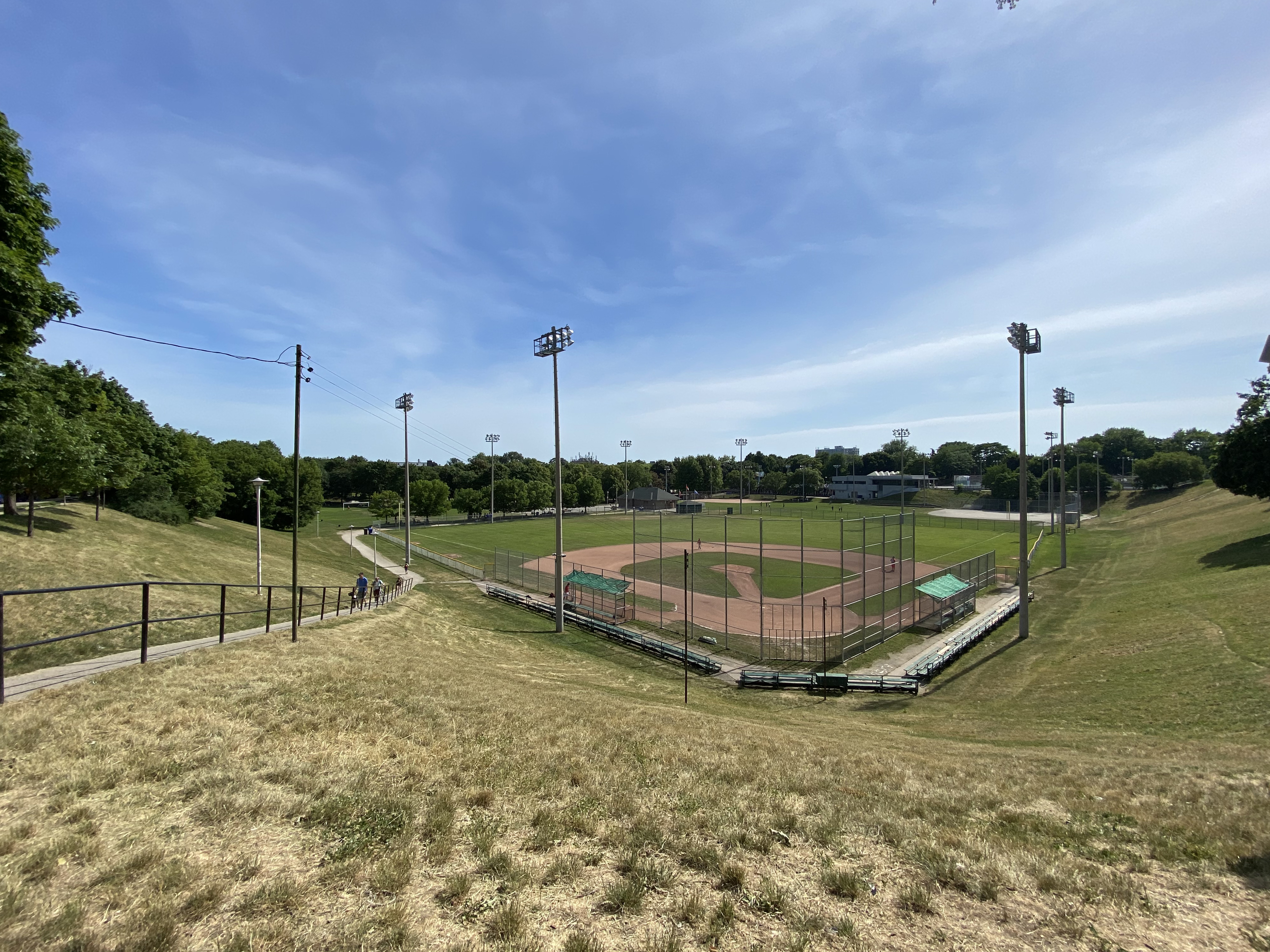

- Location in Toronto Location in Ontario Location in Canada
- Former names: Christie Pits Field
- Location: Christie/Barton
- Coordinates: 43°39′57″N 79°25′13″W
- Owner: City of Toronto
- Capacity: 1,000
- Surface: Grass
- Field size: Left Field Foul Line 91 metres (299 ft); Right Field Foul Line 91 metres (299 ft); Centre Field Line 100 metres (330 ft)

Tenant
- Toronto Maple Leafs

There are three baseball fields at the Pits. The large and main venue is in the northeast corner of the park. The field has limited seating capacity with bench seats along the first and third bases with most spectators sitting along the grass hills. A wood broadcast booth is located at the top of the northeast corner. There are no change rooms at this field; players change in the washrooms near the concession stand beyond centre field. The park hosts the Toronto Maple Leafs of the Canadian Baseball League, the High Park Juniors of the Toronto Baseball Association, and local high school games. A smaller baseball diamond is located next to the washroom facilities.

On February 2, 2010, it was announced that the main ballpark at Christie Pits would be named "Dominico Field" in honor of longtime owners of the IBL Maple Leafs; Jack and Lynne Dominico. There was a ceremony during a Maple Leafs home game May 9, 2010 to make it official.

== 1933 riot ==
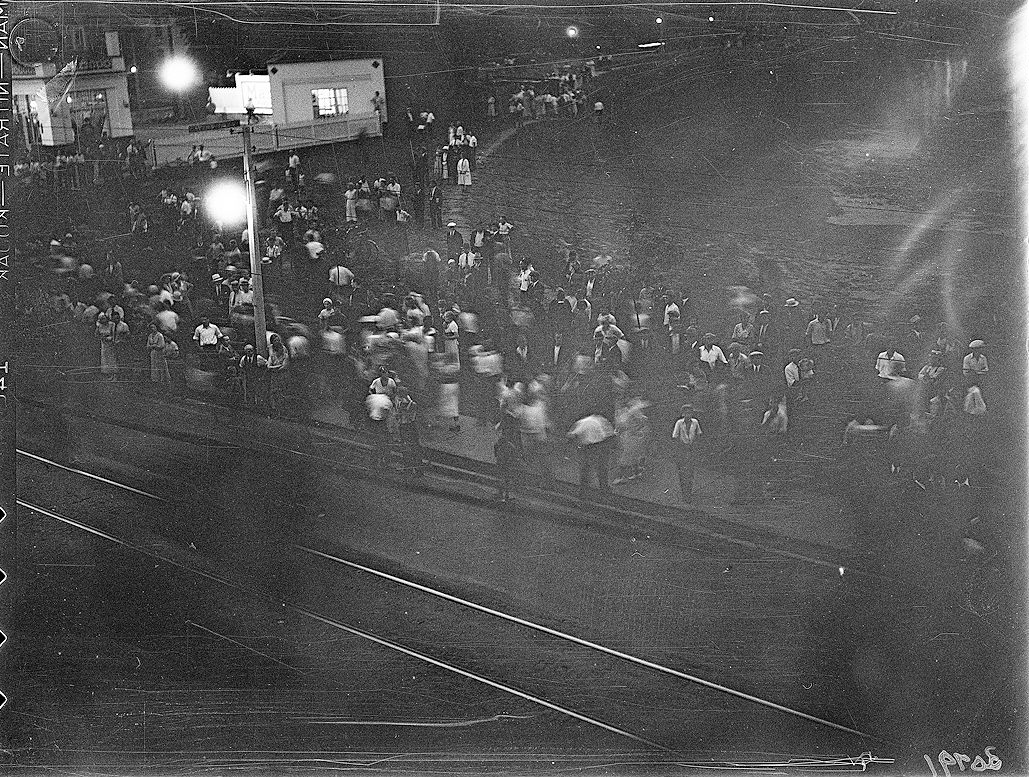
The only known photograph of the Christie Pits riot

On August 16, 1933, Christie Pits was the scene of a six-hour riot, mostly between the Anglo-Canadian Pit Gang (also called the Swastika-Club) and a group of young men and boys, who were mostly Jewish with some Italians and Ukrainians, who were not a gang, but sometimes were incorrectly referred to as the Spadina Avenue Gang. One of the baseball diamonds was being used for a series of baseball games between two local amateur teams, one of which predominantly consisted of Jewish players. Two nights earlier, at the first game of the series, there had been a display of a swastika and police were warned that there could be trouble at the second game. Those warnings were ignored, and after the second game, a blanket with a large swastika painted on it was displayed by members of the Pit Gang. The Jewish youths at the game responded to the display, supporters of both sides poured in from the surrounding streets and a riot ensued. The Toronto Daily Star captured the event the next day,

"While groups of youths wielded fists and clubs in a series of violent scraps for possession of a white flag bearing a swastika symbol at Willowvale Park last night, a crowd of more than 10,000 citizens, excited by cries of 'Heil Hitler' became suddenly a disorderly mob and surged wildly about the park and surrounding streets, trying to gain a view of the actual combatants, which soon developed in violence and intensity of racial feeling into one of the worst free-for-alls ever seen in the city. Scores were injured, many requiring medical and hospital attention ... Heads were opened, eyes blackened and bodies thumped and battered as literally dozens of persons, young or old, many of them non-combatant spectators, were injured more or less seriously by a variety of ugly weapons in the hands of wild-eyed and irresponsible young hoodlums, both Jewish and Gentile."

A Heritage Toronto plaque was installed at Christie Pits Park on the 75th anniversary of the riot in August 2008.

== Friends of Christie Pits Park ==
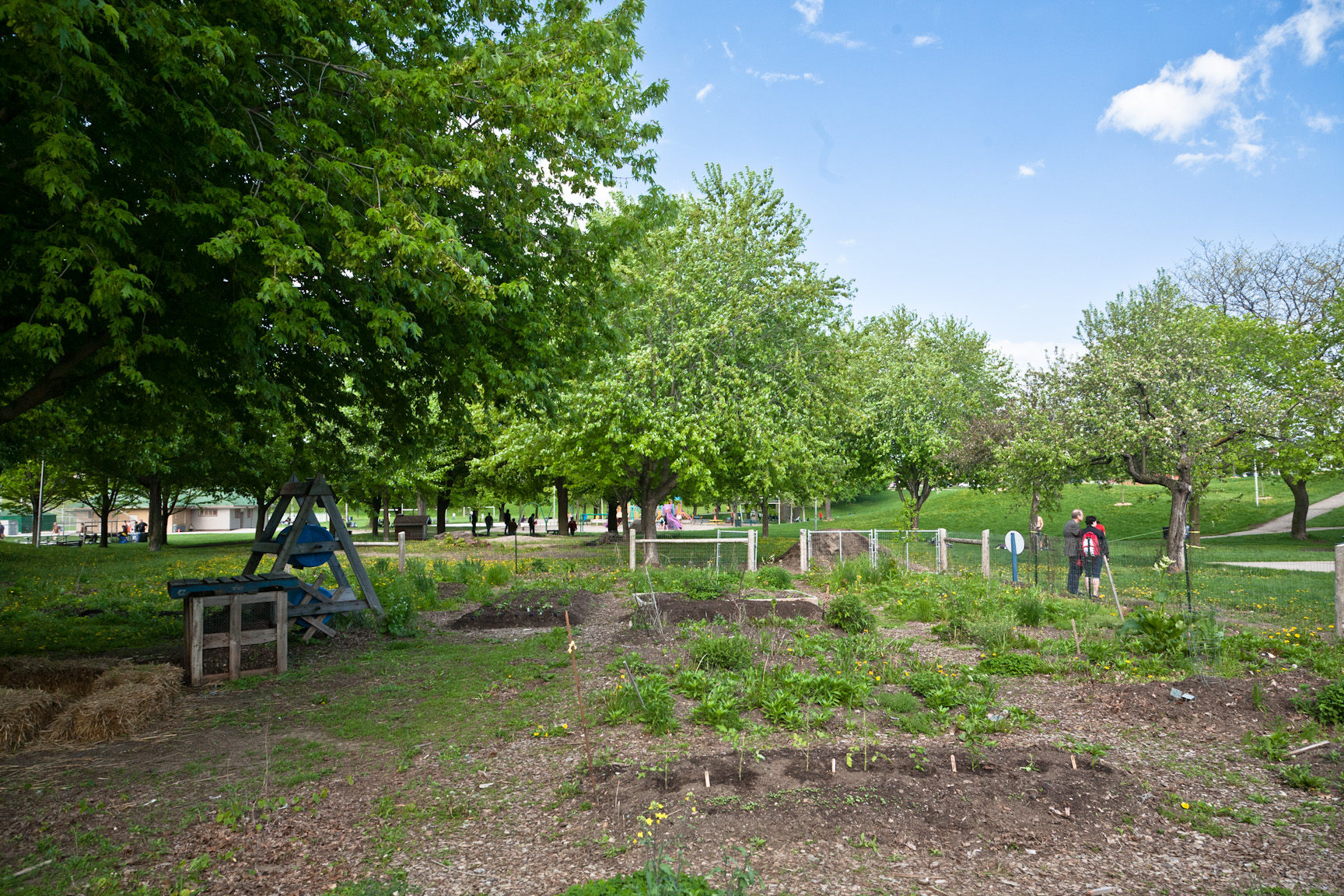
The community garden in Christie Pits

In August 2007 a Friends of Christie Pits Park group was formed. It is currently active in organizing events and advocating on behalf of the Park.
