= Nathan Cohen (critic) =

Theatre critic, broadcaster, publisher

- Born: Samuel Nathan Cohen; 16 April 1923; Whitney Pier, Sydney, Nova Scotia, Canada
- Died: 26 March 1971 (aged 47); Toronto, Ontario, Canada
- Education: Mount Allison University
- Occupation: Journalist
- Years active: 1942–1971
- Employer(s): Canadian Broadcasting Corporation, Toronto Telegram, The Toronto Daily Star
- Known for: Arts criticism/TV Broadcaster
- Notable work: The Glace Bay Gazette; Fighting Words TV Series
- Political party: Labor-Progressive Party (ca. 1945–1947)*
- Spouse: Gloria Cohen (née Brontman)
- Children: 2
- Awards: Honorary Doctors of Law

Notes
- * Only for about two years (1945–47). In the 1960s he described himself as a left-leaning Liberal.

Samuel Nathan Cohen known as Nathan Cohen (16 April 1923 – 26 March 1971) was a Canadian theatre critic and broadcaster. Cohen was considered the country's only serious drama critic during the first two decades following World War II, the period when Canadian theatre became established. He was born in Sydney, Nova Scotia, to an Eastern European Jewish immigrant family. He got his start in media when he was the editor of Mount Allison University's student newspaper. After graduating from Mount Allison, he was the editor of the Glace Bay Gazette. He permanently moved to Toronto in 1945 and wrote for various Communist Party supported newspapers. In 1948, he became the Theatre critic for CBC Radio. When CBC began television broadcasts in the 1950s, Cohen became one of their first talk show hosts. He joined The Toronto Daily Star in 1959, and worked as its theatre critic until his death in 1971.

== Early life ==
Cohen was born and raised in the Whitney Pier section of Sydney, Nova Scotia. His family were Jewish immigrants from Poland (Pale of Settlement) that settled near the Dominion Steel and Coal Corporation's steel mill, Atlantic Canada's major steel mill. His parents changed their name to Cohen from Kaplansky when they arrived in Halifax. Cohen had three siblings: two older sisters born in Poland, and a younger brother. Cohen was the first boy and member of his family to be born in Canada. As a child, he read persistently in the backroom of his parents' grocery store, where he developed a love for science fiction, comics, and novels. He graduated from Sydney Academy High School, where he was heavily influenced by one of his English teachers, William Mould, who encouraged him to read Shakespeare. He entered Mount Allison University at age 16, and edited the university's student newspaper and yearbook.

== Professional career ==
=== Glace Bay Gazette ===
After he graduated from Mount Allison, he studied law at Osgoode Hall Law School for a semester, but returned to Nova Scotia without graduating. He found employment as a journalist, in effect becoming a one-man show, by editing, reporting, typesetting and publishing the Glace Bay Gazette, a union-owned mass-published daily newspaper from 1942 to 1945.

=== Labor-Progressive Party ===
He joined the Labor-Progressive Party—as the Communist Party was then known—and moved to Toronto in 1945. He worked for the party paper, Canadian Tribune. He was also engaged as an editor of the Yiddish communist weekly newspaper, the Vochenblatt. He worked on its English-language section writing political articles, book reviews and then theatre reviews.

Joe Gershman, the editor of the Vochenblatt, later remarked about Cohen's Communist affiliation: "During the years he was a member, he was a rebel against certain postulates held by the party. He was not in favor of democratic centralism, particularly in the matter of art. He felt a writer should be given a chance to explore and write freely what he thinks and sees, rather than follow the party line. Nathan was, in nature, a rebel, even. when he was in the Communist Party." Cohen likely quit the party around 1947.

=== CBC Radio and Television ===
He came to the attention of Mavor Moore who recommended Cohen to the Canadian Broadcasting Corporation where, as a theatre critic, he hosted Across the Footlights, The Theatre Week and CJBC Views the Shows. Cohen received national prominence as host of Fighting Words, an intellectual, but popular panel show on CBC Television from 1953 to 1962. Cohen also worked for CBC Television in the 1950s as a script editor for the anthology series General Motors Theatre and continued with CBC Radio conducting interviews on the show Audio.

=== Toronto Telegram and Toronto Daily Star ===
In the 1950s, he also published his own magazine, The Critic. Cohen began writing a theatre column for the Toronto Telegram in 1957 and was hired away by the Toronto Daily Star two years later, becoming the paper's entertainment editor and remaining there until his death. Cohen was known for his integrity as a critic and did not hesitate to give negative reviews, breaking with the common critical practices of the time which consisted mostly of uncritical praise. He was asked by the Canadian University Press to come up with tips for aspiring arts critics and he turned that into a Toronto Star column "Rules for budding critics" in 1964.

Cohen was not above hurting struggling theatre companies. He was openly antagonistic to the Crest Theatre Foundation theatre company, leading the Canada Council for the Arts to deny it funding. He also was instrumental in its demise, after the company was blocked from moving to the St. Lawrence Centre for the Arts. As well, his attacks on the Crest founders, Donald and Murray Davis, and Barbara Chilcott, meant they were unable to get work in Toronto for the next ten years after the Crest folded in 1966.

== Late career and death ==
In his later years, he suffered from heart disease caused by diabetic complications, and died at St. Michael's Hospital in Toronto, a few hours after having open heart surgery in the early hours of 26 March 1971.
