= Vochenblatt =

Yiddish communist newspaper in Canada

Keneder yiddishe vochenblatt
- Editor: Joshua Gershman
- Founded: 1926
- Ceased publication: 1979
- Political alignment: Communist, socialist
- Language: Yiddish, English
- Headquarters: Toronto
- Country: Canada
- Sister newspapers: Canadian Jewish Outlook

The Keneder yiddishe vochenblatt (Yiddish: קענעדער ײִדישער ואָכנבּלאַט, lit. 'Canadian Jewish Weekly'), known as the Vochenblatt, was a Yiddish-language communist newspaper in Canada, published from Toronto from 1926 to 1979. Vochenblatt was one of the major communist Yiddish newspapers in the world during the Cold War. The newspaper was edited by Sam Lipshitz and then by Joshua Gershman until his death in 1978.

== History ==
The newspaper was launched in 1926 as Der kampf ('The Struggle') by the Communist Party of Canada, with Sam Lipshitz as editor. The paper was renamed Der veg ('The Road'), and finally Der keneder yidishe vochenblatt in October 1940.' The title 'Vochenblatt' was perceived as more 'safe' by the party, seeking to avoid state interference in its press activities. Harry Guralnick served as the executive secretary of the Canadian Jewish Weekly Association, the organization that published the newspaper.

In March 1943 Vochenblatt began including English pages regularly, in an effort to reach out to English-speaking Jews. Nathan Cohen served as editor of the English pages and wrote theatre and film reviews. The English-language section of Vochenblatt was later replaced by a monthly supplement, the Canadian Jewish Outlook, which later became a standalone publication.

Initially, Vochenblatt adopted a firm anti-Zionist stand, but that posture was softened as World War II progressed. The newspaper was supportive of calls from the Zionist leadership in Palestine to support the Allies. As of mid-1942, Vochenblatt began using the term Eretz Yisrael for Palestine. Still, the newspaper still maintained its support for the Birobidzhan movement. During the 1941–1945 period the newspaper supported the foundation of an independent joint Jewish-Arab state in Palestine. As of 1948 Vochenblat favoured the establishment of a Jewish state in Palestine, and as the Arab–Israeli War began it issued a call to Canadian Jews to campaign against any compromise against the UN resolution on establishing a Jewish state in Palestine.

In 1948, the newspaper became the de facto organ of the United Jewish People's Order. Gershman served as general secretary of UJPO. UJPO cut its ties and financial relationship with the newspaper when it severed its affiliation to the Communist Party of Canada (then known as the Labor-Progressive Party) at the end of 1956. In 1959, former Vochenblatt editor Sam Lipshitz joined Salsberg in leaving UJPO to form the New Fraternal Jewish Association, with Lipshitz editing the new organization's newsletter, Fraternally Yours from 1960 until 2000.

In its later years, Vochenblat was published biweekly, rather than every week.

== See also ==
- Keneder Adler
