= Toronto Jewish Folk Choir =

- Choir
- Origin: Toronto
- Founded: 1925
- Affiliation: United Jewish Peoples' Order
- Website: http://winchevskycentre.org/about-us/toronto-jewish-folk-choir/

The Toronto Jewish Folk Choir is Canada's oldest Jewish choral group. It consists of approximately 30 singers and is conducted by Alexander Veprinsky. Its repertoire, sung in four-part harmony, encompasses a wide range of secular Jewish music, classical works on Jewish themes and songs of many countries. The group specializes in Yiddish folk songs and songs of a working class character. The Choir is based at Toronto's Winchevsky Centre and is affiliated with the United Jewish Peoples' Order.

== History ==
The amateur choral group was founded in 1925 by Jewish immigrant laborers, and was originally called the Freiheith Gezangs Farein (Freedom Singing Society). Its first conductor was Hyman Riegelhaupt. In the late 1930s, it was given its English name in an attempt to reach out to a broader audience in order to promote opposition to Nazism. The choir continues to give an annual spring concert in Toronto and performs at various Jewish festivals and events.

The choir's early repertoire consisted largely of Yiddish and Hebrew folk songs, operettas, and reflected a working class sentiment. Under the leadership of Emil Gartner, it increased in size to 130 singers by the late 1940s, and its repertoire expanded to include Canadian folk songs as well as works by Handel, Mendelssohn, Schubert, and others. During this time period the choir was often accompanied by the Toronto Symphony Orchestra, and performed at large venues in Toronto, including Massey Hall. Among the well-known composers who have written works for the Choir are John Weinzweig, Louis Applebaum, Milton Barnes, Srul Irving Glick, Ben Steinberg, and Leon Zuckert.

In the 1990s, the choir's history was recorded in a documentary, Keeping the Flame Alive. In 2005, the choir was the subject of a PhD dissertation, We Shall Go Forward With Our Songs Into a Better Life, by Beneta Walters-Fredland.
