= Outlook (Jewish magazine) =

Canadian Jewish periodical

Outlook: Canada's Progressive Jewish Magazine
- Editor: Carl Rosenberg
- Categories: Jewish, progressive, socialist
- Frequency: 4-6 times a year
- Total circulation: 500 (2016)
- First issue: October 1963 as Canadian Jewish Outlook
- Final issue: 2016
- Country: Canada
- Based in: Toronto (1963-1979); Vancouver, British Columbia (1979-2016)
- Language: English
- Website: Archived website

Outlook: Canada's Progressive Jewish Magazine was an independent, secular Jewish periodical published six times a year and based in Vancouver, British Columbia.

Founded in 1963 as the Canadian Jewish Outlook, an English supplement to the Yiddish newspaper The Vochenblatt, the publication had a "socialist-humanist" perspective. It received support from the United Jewish Peoples Order though it was not formally affiliated with it. Outlook was the only Canadian publication devoted to yiddishkeit, Jewish ethical humanism and Israeli-Palestinian peace and justice issues.

The magazine adopted its shortened name in 1986. In 1988 The Canadian Jewish Outlook Anthology, a collection of articles, editorials and reviews carried in the magazine during its first twenty-five years was published with Henry Rosenthal and Cathy Berson as editors.

The magazine's circulation peaked at 3,000 in the 1990s but had declined to 500 by 2016. It was based first in Toronto with Joshua Gershman as publisher and de facto editor until his death in 1978 and, since 1979 in Vancouver where it was edited by Hank Rosenthal, Ben Chud and Sylvia Friedman, and since 1998 by Carl Rosenberg and Friedman. After a run of 52 years, it ceased publication with its Spring 2016 issue.
